= 1987 in Palestine =

- Decades: 1960s; 1970s; 1980s; 1990s; 2000s
- See also: History of Palestine; Timeline of Palestinian history; List of years in Palestine

Events in the year 1987 in Palestine.

== Incumbents ==
- Chairman of the Palestine Liberation Organization – Yasser Arafat

== Events ==
=== January ===
- 3 January: An-Najah National University is closed by order of the Israeli authorities for almost three weeks on allegations that disturbances were being planned on campus.
- 20 January: Israeli Minister of Defence Yitzhak Rabin holds a meeting with the chairs of several universities in the West Bank warning them against becoming sources of unrest.
- 22 January: Birzeit University student elections are held. The leftist-nationalist bloc wins 41.5% of the vote, the Islamist bloc 34%, and the Marxist bloc 24.5%.

=== February ===
- 9 February: The February 1987 Palestinian unrest begins after a Palestinian riot clashes with Israeli forces.
- 10 February: An-Najah National University is closed by order of the Israeli authorities for a month.
- 16 February: Roger Heacock, an American professor at Birzeit University, is arrested by the Israeli authorities and charged with having led a women's demonstration in Ramallah against the War of the Camps. The same day, the Israeli-Palestinian Alternative Information Center is controversially raided by the Israeli authorities, with all staff placed under arrest.

=== March ===
- 15 March: Former American president Jimmy Carter begins a visit to the Middle East to press for peace talks. During the visit, Carter accuses the Israeli government of failing to uphold the Camp David Accords for Palestinian autonomy and warns that the American government has "lost the initiative" in the region.
- 25 March: The 1987 Palestinian prisoners' hunger strike begins.
- 31 March: Land Day is marked by demonstrations across the occupied Palestinian territories and by some Arab citizens of Israel.

=== April ===
- 11 April: A Palestinian terrorist firebombs an Israeli family's car in the West Bank, murdering Ofra Moses and her five-year-old son Tal. In response, settlers riot through the Palestinian town of Qalqilya.
- 13 April: A demonstration by students at Birzeit University clashes with Israeli forces, resulting in the death of student Musa Hanafi and the closure of the university for four months, the longest forced closure in the university's history at that point.
- 15 April: The Temple Mount Faithful organise a march on the Temple Mount and the Al-Aqsa mosque compound, leading to a standoff between the group and Palestinians protestors. The same day, a settler in Kiryat Arba shoots and injures a Palesetinian student from Hebron University after an argument broke out between the two and the settler mistook a Quran the student was holding for a grenade.
- 20 April: The Palestine National Council begins a week-long meeting in Algiers to try and reconcile the schisms between the different PLO factions.
- 21 April: After incidents of Palestinian stone-throwing at the cars of Israeli settlers, the Israeli military erects a security fence around the Dheisheh refugee camp.

=== May ===
- 1 May: An Ethiopian Israeli is stabbed by a Palestinian in Hebron, sustaining light injuries. In response, Gush Emunim figure Daniella Weiss leads another settler riot through the Palestinian town of Qalqilya.
- 14 May: Birzeit University student council leader and prominent Fatah youth activist Marwan Barghouti as well as former An-Najah National University student council leader Khalil Ashour are deported from the occupied territories.
- 17 May: Six Palestinian Islamic Jihad terrorists escape from Israeli custody in the Gaza Strip in a high-profile prison break.

=== June ===
- 6 June: The 1987 Dheisheh attack, led by Daniella Weiss, occurs after an Israeli settler is injured in a Palestinian stone-throwing incident.

=== July ===
- 4 July: The first of the Amirav-Husseini peace meetings is held. the peace meeting would collapse in early September following Husseini's arrest by the Israeli authorities (his third arrest in 1987).

=== August ===
- 2 August: Murder of Ron Tal. Israeli soldier Ron Tal is murdered in the Gaza Strip by Palestinian Islamic Jihad terrorists.
- 31 August: An-Najah National University suspends classes for two months due to clashes between members of the Islamist student bloc and members of the nationalist student bloc.

=== September ===
- 5 September: Four Israeli warplanes bomb three PLO guerrilla bases on the outskirts of the Palestinian refugee camp Ain al-Hilweh in Lebanon. Up to 41 people were reported killed in the incident. An IDF spokesman stated that the targets bombed were being used by terrorist cells that were planning raids against Israeli targets.
- 19 September: Hebron University is ordered closed until early October by the Israeli authorities following a student demonstration on the anniversary of the 1982 Sabra and Shatila massacre.
- 21 September: Prominent philosopher Sari Nusseibeh is attacked by extremist students at Birzeit University for his role in the Amirav-Husseini peace meetings.
- 24 September: Israeli reservist Alexander Arad is murdered by a Palestinian near the Megiddo Junction in Israel.

=== October ===
- 8 October: During a shootout that took place between Israeli security forces and four armed Islamic Jihad guerrillas in the Gaza Strip, all four guerrillas were killed, as well as one Shin Bet officer. The incident sparks unrest among Palestinians.
- 28 October: Bethlehem University students demonstrate following a midnight Israeli raid on the Dheisheh refugee camp where all men between the ages of 18 and 30 were rounded up. In the Israeli military's move to disperse the demonstration, student Ishaq Abu Surur dies. The Israeli authorities subsequently order the university closed for three months.

=== November ===
- 8 November: The 1987 Arab League summit begins in Amman, during which Palestinians are left feeling humiliated and forgotten by the Arab League.
- 10 November: 16-year-old Palestinian Intisar al-Attara dies in an incident in the Gaza Strip involving Israeli settlers. The death, as well as the subsequent release from custody of the settlers involved without charges, sparks unrest among Palestinians.
- 16 November: Abdul Aziz Awda, a lecturer at the Islamic University of Gaza and founder of the Palestinian Islamic Jihad terrorist group, is ordered deported, sparking unrest in Gaza.

=== December ===
- 6 December: Israeli businessman Shlomo Takal is stabbed to death at the main shopping square in Gaza City.
- 8 December: Israeli truck driver collides with two taxis carrying workers returning from work in Israel. Four Palestinians from the refugee camp Jabalia in the Gaza Strip are killed in the incident. A rumor which spread among Palestinians that the crash was deliberate and made in retaliation for the murder of an Israeli businessman in Gaza City two days earlier, sparked the First Intifada the next day.
- 9 December: First Intifada begins: violence, riots, general strikes, and civil disobedience campaigns by Palestinians spread across the West Bank and Gaza Strip. Israeli forces respond with tear gas, plastic bullets, and live ammunition.
- 10 December: Hamas is founded by Palestinian Islamic scholar Ahmed Yassin after the outbreak of the First Intifada.
- 11 December: The Israeli military begins an operation to break the de facto control of Fatah's youth wing over the Balata Camp, fueling the spread of the First Intifada into the West Bank.
- 15 December: Israeli politician Ariel Sharon controversially moves into a flat in the Muslim Quarter of the Old City of Jerusalem, fueling the spread of the First Intifada into East Jerusalem.
- 22 December: Israeli Minister of Defence Yitzhak Rabin tours the Gaza Strip after his return from a ten-day trip to the United States, which he had refused to cut short to respond to the growing unrest in the occupied territories.
- 27 December: The Israeli military begins a process of expedited trials of the hundreds of Palestinians who had been arrested since the start of the First Intifada. In response, Palestinian lawyers announce a widespread boycott of the Israeli justice system.

== Deaths ==
- 29 August – Naji al-Ali, a Palestinian cartoonist, noted for the political criticism of Israel in his works. (born 1938)

== See also ==
- 1987 in Israel
