= Spring 1987 West Bank unrest =

Period of unrest in the Palestinian West Bank

- Part of Israeli–Palestinian conflict
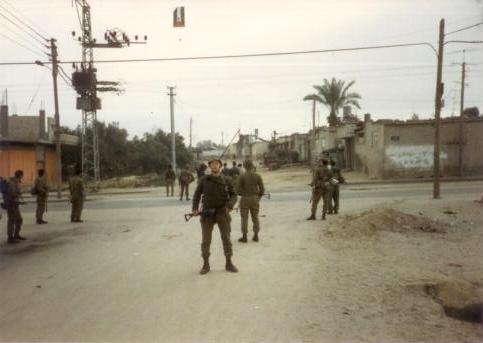
- Israeli soldiers removing a Palestinian flag in Rafah in March 1987
- Date: 25 March 1987 – 15 April 1987
- Location: Occupied Palestinian Territories, principally in the West Bank
- Methods: Hunger strike, demonstrations, rioting, stone-throwing, firebombing, mass arrests, curfews
- Result: Negotiated end to Palestinian prisoners' hunger strike; Death of Israeli settlers Ofra and Tal Moses, as well as of Palestinian student Musa Hanafi; Closure of Birzeit University for four months; Increased security measures in the West Bank; Increased tensions and polarisation between Israelis and Palestinians

Parties
Palestinians in Israeli custody Palestinian students Palestinian extremists	Israel Prison Service; Israel Defence Forces; Israeli settlers

Casualties
- Deaths: 3 (2 Israeli, 1 Palestinian)
- Arrested: Several hundred

The Spring 1987 West Bank unrest was a period of heightened unrest in the Palestinian West Bank from mid-March to mid-April 1987. The period was marked by a series of intertwined events, including a hunger strike by Palestinians in Israeli custody, riots by Palestinians in support of the hunger strike, the murder of Israeli settlers Ofra Moses and her five-year-old son Tal by Palestinian militants, anti-Palestinian rioting by Israeli settlers, and the temporary closure of the Palestinian Birzeit University.

In the Middle East Contemporary Survey, Volume XI, 1987, Itamar Rabinovich and Haim Shaked identified the unrest as the second significant wave of disturbances in the occupied Palestinian territories in 1987, following the February 1987 Palestinian unrest, sparked by Palestinian protests over the War of the Camps in Syria. In the American Jewish Year Book, Ralph Mandel identified the unrest that followed the hunger strike as "some of the worst violence of the year prior to the December uprising."

== Background ==
Israel captured the West Bank from Jordan during the Six-Day War in 1967 and had occupied it for nearly twenty years by 1987. Contemporary reporting described growing confrontations involving a generation of Palestinians who had been born or had come of age during the occupation, alongside a West Bank settler population that had nearly doubled since 1983.

== Events ==
=== Palestinian prisoners' hunger strike ===
On 25 March 1987, 3,000 Palestinians in Israeli custody in several different Israeli prisons launched a hunger strike in protest over the conditions they were being held in. Among the complaints listed by the prisoners were overcrowding, lack of sunlight, lack of ventilation, and abuse by Israeli prison officials. The re-opening of the Ansar II prison, which had been shut down in 1986 after reports of physical abuse of prisoners, to handle the increasingly growing Palestinian prisoner population, was another factor. Another major complaint was an alleged refusal by newly appointed Israel Prison Service head David Maimon to recognise and negotiate with prisoners' self-formed committees. Israeli Minister of Police Haim Bar-Lev denied the allegations against Maimon, saying that "the prison commissioner does not set policy – not the incumbent one, not the previous one nor the one who preceded him," and claimed that the strike had been sparked by prisoners upset over not being released in exchange for IDF soldiers captured in Lebanon. Maimon told Kol Yisrael that he hadn't changed prison conditions, but did wish to "to put an end to the situation where prisoners' leaders were running the prisons."

The outbreak of the hunger strike led to a number of protests across Palestine in support of the prisoners, including commercial strikes, student strikes, sit-ins, marches, and in some cities, general strikes. The protests were largely led by Palestinian women and students. According to Mary Curtius of The Christian Science Monitor, "the hunger strike seems to have captured the imagination of Palestinian youth on the West Bank. Busloads of high school students now travel each day to the Arab East Jerusalem offices of the International Red Cross, where the mothers of hunger striking prisoners await daily reports on the condition of the strikers. ... Observers say the actions in support of the fasting prisoners are the most sustained and widespread since a wave of unrest swept the West Bank in 1982."

Some protesting Palestinians were arrested as Israeli police dispersed demonstrations. Other protests developed into riots, with protestors clashing with Israeli forces, including throwing stones at Israeli soldiers and Israeli military vehicles. On 6 April, there was an incident where two Palestinian men were shot and injured in East Jerusalem by a Shin Bet agent after they threw stones at the agent's car, shattering the windshield. On 7 April, there was an incident where one Palestinian was shot and injured after trying to grab a soldier's gun. As a result of the demonstrations, Israeli authorities also imposed curfews on several Palestinian cities.

The prisoners ultimately agreed to end the hunger strike on 13 April, following negotiations with Maimon. The strike had been the longest and most extensive Palestinian prisoners' hunger strike since the 1980 Palestinian prisoners' hunger strike.

=== Land Day ===
Land Day is an annual day of demonstrations in Palestine on 30 March held to mark the anniversary of a significant wave of protests that broke out in 1976 over a move by the Israeli government to confiscate Palestinian land. Ahead of the day, the Civil Administration ordered three Palestinian universities, An-Najah National University, Bethlehem University, and Birzeit University, to be temporarily shut down as a measure to prevent Land Day protests from being held on the three campuses.

The demonstrations were on the whole calm. Commercial strikes and school strikes were successfully held in some Palestinian cities, particularly in Ramallah and East Jerusalem, while commercial strikes in other cities, such as Gaza City and Nablus were met with more limited observance.

A handful of the demonstrations saw protestors clash with Israeli soldiers. One Palestinian youth was injured in Jenin, after Israeli shot with live ammunition at a group of youth that threw stones at them. A curfew was placed on the Balata Camp after Israeli soldiers dispersed a stone-throwers using tear gas. One Israeli was injured near Al-Bireh by a stone that hit his vehicle. In Ramallah, eight youth were arrested for incitment.

=== Murder of Ofra Moses ===
On the evening of 11 April 1987, Palestinian man Muhammad Daoud threw a Molotov cocktail at a car driven by a family of Israeli settlers from Alfei Menashe, killing 35-year-old Ofra Moses and severely burning Moses' husband, her three children, and a family friend, requiring hospitalisation at the Sheba Medical Center. One of Moses' children, a five-year-old boy named Tal, would subsequently die from his injuries. The family had been driving to Petah Tikva so that they could buy food to celebrate Passover.

In the hours following the killing, around 600 settlers from Alfei Menashe attacked the nearby Palestinian town of Qalqilya. The settlers burned down orchards, threw stones at houses in the town, and vandalised cars. The settlers accused the Israeli military of failing to protect them, with Shlomo Katan, the mayor of Alfei Menashe, stating that "the local residents would not have had to take the law into their hands if the security forces had done their job." In response to the attack and subsequent riot, the Israeli military declared the Palestinian towns of Qalqilya and Hableh to be a "closed military area," imposing a curfew. The leader of the riot was Gush Emunim figure Daniella Weiss. The next day, groups of armed settlers patrolled several Palestinian cities, including Ramallah.

On 12 April, as a result of the killing, the Israeli military enacted a significant crackdown on Palestinians, arresting over 80 prominent Palestinian figures and holding them in administrative detention, as well as raiding a UNRWA training institute in Ramallah, arresting over 140 of the institute's students and injuring 17. The Israeli military stated that the figures placed in administrative detention were "organizers, planners and leaders of the disturbances." Among the figures placed in administrative detention were Faisal Husseini, a former editor-in-chief of the Al Fajr newspaper, and a leader of the joint Israeli-Palestinian Alternative Information Center. The Israeli military also moved to bulldoze the orange trees alongside the road where Moses had been killed, saying that they had been frequently used for ambushes. Israeli Minister of Defence Yitzhak Rabin released a statement saying that the Israeli government would use "whatever measures that are allowed by the law to ensure to everybody the right to drive freely and securely along the roads; to cope with those who try to instigate terror acts, those who organise and those who carry them out."

12 April also saw a number of clashes between Israeli soldiers and protesting Palestinians, with the Israeli military reporting stone throwing incidents in seven different areas that day and vandalism of cars with Israeli licence plates, and four Palestinian protestors being injured while being arrested for stone throwing.

=== Birzeit University closure ===
Early 1987 also saw a period of heightened unrest at Birzeit University, one of the most prominent Palestinian universities. The university was ordered closed three times by the Israeli authorities, for the first time in late February for four days following a wave of protests across Palestine triggered by the Israeli military's use of live ammunition to disperse a rally held in the Balata Camp. Also in late February, American professor of history at the university Roger Heacock was arrested by the Israeli military and charged with having incited a women's demonstration in Ramallah. Heacock's trial began in late March and concluded in early June, where he was issued a wo-month suspended sentence and a $950 fine. On 19 March, the Israeli military conducted a four-hour search of the university campus, seizing a number of books and student council material, without presenting a warrant or a list of what had been seized to the university administration.

When the Palestinian prisoners' hunger strike broke out in late March, the students at Birzeit University a small handful of demonstrations in support of the prisoners, including a two-day solidarity hunger strike and a silent march around the university's new campus. The university was subsequently ordered closed for four days by the Israeli authorities as a measure to prevent Land Day demonstrations from being held on campus, the second forced closure within the last month and a half. Israeli soldiers also carried out several nighttime raids of the university's student dormitories, without arresting any students.

Tensions then spiked as a result of the killing of Ofra Moses and the ensuing anti-Palestinian riots, with students at the university fearing that it would be the target of a settler riot or another crackdown by Israeli forces. On the morning of 13 April, a student rally was held at Birzeit to show support for the hunger strike and to protest against the crackdown. After beginning on the university campus, the rally merged with a secondary school students' rally in the city. In response, the Israeli military deployed soldiers to the city to contain and disperse the protest. After some of the students threw stones at the soldiers, the soldiers opened fire using live ammunition, injuring at least four students and killing one, a 23-year-old history and political student named Musa Hanafi. Students who participated in the protest claimed that the soldiers opened fire without warning and without first using other, less lethal means of protest dispersal like water cannons and tear gas. A Southern Baptist missionary in the city interviewed by The Jerusalem Post claimed that "though only some of the troops wore helmets, they were at a safe distance from the stone throwers." The Israeli military claimed that the soldiers had only opened fire after two soldiers had been trapped by stone-throwing students. The soldiers then pursued fleeing protestors back into the university campus, where students barricaded themselves inside campus buildings.

Following the clashes, the Israeli Civil Administration ordered the university closed. The order included a ban on faculty members accessing research labs and the university library. Later in April, the Israeli military arrested Marwan Barghouti, the chair of the Birzeit student council, and ordered him exiled from the Palestinian Territories on chargse of "inciting violent demonstrations and widespread disturbances on and off the campus, and organising activities to promote the aims of the Fatah organisation."

=== Other incidents ===
On 14 April 1987, Ibrahimieh College and the Islamic University of Gaza announced that they would temporarily suspend classes to protest against alleged Israeli harassment of Palestinian universities.

On 15 April, the extremist Temple Mount Faithful organised a march on the Temple Mount and the Al-Aqsa mosque compound, escorted by Israeli police. The march resulted in a standoff between the group and Palestinians protestors who blocked their path, with the police eventually ordering the group to withdraw. Later that day, a settler in Kiryat Arba shot and injured a student from Hebron University after an argument broke out between the two and the settler mistook a Quran the student was holding for a grenade.

The following days in April would also see a marked increase in the number of firebombs thrown by Palestinians at Israeli vehicles, includings incidents near Bethlehem and near Gaza City. The Israeli crackdown would also continue, with around one hundred Palestinians in the Gaza Strip being arrested between 21 and 22 April and the erection of a six-metre fence around the Dheisheh refugee camp in the West Bank.

=== Ongoing negotiations ===
In mid March, former American president Jimmy Carter made a private visit to the Middle East in which he met with the leaders of several countries to press for peace talks in the Israeli–Palestinian and Arab–Israeli conflicts. Among the notable comments Carter made during the visit, he accused the Israeli government of having failed to meet its commitments to allow full Palestinian autonomy and to restrict settlement in the Camp David Accords, signed when Carter was president. He also stated that he saw "a dramatic change in attitude of Arab leaders" in their willingness to formally recognise the State of Israel, and called for negotiations to directly include the PLO as a representative of Palestinians.

The Israeli government, a unity coalition comprising both the right-wing Likud and centre-left Israeli Labor Party, was deeply divided over negotiations. One key issue of disagreement was the participation of the Soviet Union in talks, which Likud opposed but that the Labor Party was willing to accept if the Soviet Union allowed increased Jewish emigration to Israel. Likud also opposed the participation of Arab states that were not friendly with Israel in talks, and opposed any territorial concessions as an outcome of talks, including territory in the West Bank and the Gaza Strip. Likud also more broadly opposed the idea of an international peace conference, preferring one-on-one negotiations with individual Arab states, while Labor supported the idea of a conference.

On 11 April, King Hussein of Jordan and Israeli Minister of Foreign Affairs Shimon Peres, of the Israeli Labor Party, signed the Peres–Hussein London Agreement in London, United Kingdom, outlining the framework for an international peace conference aiming at solving the Israeli–Palestinian and Arab–Israeli conflicts via the Jordanian option.

The Palestinian Liberation Organisation was also deeply divided. The PLO consisted of seven major factions, with the relatively moderate Fatah representing the single largest faction and mostly controlling PLO policy uner Yasser Arafat. Other factions included the Marxist–Leninist Popular Front for the Liberation of Palestine, widely considered hardliners, the Maoist Democratic Front for the Liberation of Palestine, the Ba'athist Palestinian Liberation Front and Arab Liberation Front, the socialist Palestinian Popular Struggle Front, the Marxist Palestinian People's Party, and the hardline Fatah splinter group the Abu Nidal Organization. In late-April 1987, the Palestinian National Council met to try and negotiate greater unity among the factions, particularly in light of a potential international peace conference. One key issue of debate was how to respond to Israeli demands that the PLO not take part as a direct negotiator in peace talks, but instead be a part of a Jordanian delegations. According to the Tribune de Genève, "for some observers, it is clear that this [hunger strike] movement was organised to coincide with the Palestinian National Council meeting on 20 April, in Algiers.

== Reactions ==
=== In Palestine ===
Mayor of Qalqilya Abdel Rahman Abu-Sunineh condemned the killing of Moses, saying that "we're against all these things. Throwing a firebomb or throwing a stone, listen, that doesn't do anything for us. And the settlers sometimes come in and make it worse." The Jerusalem Post quoted an anonymous Palestinian resident of Qalqilya as saying that "it appears as if the Israeli government wants to pay a ransom to the settlers, and we are paying it."

The Birzeit University administration stated that "the situation in the occupied territories has reached a dangerous stage if universities and university students are subject to out-and-out battlefield tactics," and accused the Israeli military of being "under pressure from extremist settlers to prove itself by hardline action against Palestinian residents." The Washington Post quoted one female student from Birzeit as saying that "We have felt insecure ever since we were born. Violence is the only way the whole world will see us and hear us. They see us as terrorists, but this way is the only way." Samir Rantissi, a Birzeit student who was participated in demonstrations in support of the hunger strikers, told The Christian Science Monitor that the support protests had reached the scale they had because they were "just the natural expression of a lot of frustration by people who don't see any hope of the situation changing soon on the West Bank."

=== In Israel ===
Minister of Defence Yitzhak Rabin stated that "we are indeed in a situation marked by a certain rise in attacks of a certain kind, first and foremost petrol bombs, and we have to deal with this." Rabin also blamed the unrest on "Palestinian terrorist organisations," saying that it would be incorrect to "blame Jewish settlers for inciting the violence, or Peres and those advocating new peace moves." Prime Minister Yitzhak Shamir stated that the Israeli government was "united in its resolute decision and its desire to take all necessary measures to bring an end to this phenomenon" and pledged to "upgrade ways of striking at terrorists and preventing repeated attacks, to guarantee the security of the Jewish population in particular and of the areas in general." Chief of the General Staff Moshe Levi pledged that if Palestinian unrest continued, "there will be more arrests. More people will be placed under administrative detention."

Mayor of Alfei Menashe Shlomo Katan stated that "we cannot live like sheep among wolves." The New York Times quoted a settler from Ariel as saying of life in settlements that "My kids go to a Government school. I have a Government mortgage. I pay taxes to the Government. To me, I am at home. Well, you don't get firebombed in your own home, and, if you do, the whole country should be up in arms, not telling me, 'What can you expect if you live there?'" The Washington Post quoted a settler from Alfei Menashe as saying "I don't like what is happening to me. I don't want to behave toward the Arabs as the goyim behaved toward us. I don't want to hate them. I just want to live quietly like before. It's amazing, but all your feelings change, even your politics. I am angry and I am afraid and it's not a nice feeling." Another settler quoted by the Washington Post who actively participated in vigilantism said that "The Army isn't doing its job so we are helping them. The Arabs are afraid of us. You can see on their faces. They know we have no problem protecting ourselves. The stick is the best weapon, not the gun. The Arab knows you will think twice before using the gun, but not to smash his face with a stick."

In late April, Prime Minister Yitzhak Shamir visited Alfei Menashe, where the settlement council expressed a desire to be allowed to form self-defence militias with the power to arrest Palestinians who they suspected of attacks on settlers. Minister of Defence Yitzhak Rabin subsequently sparked outrage among settlers when he downplayed the security importance of the settlement during an Israeli Labor Party meeting. An April 1987 poll for Maariv found that 46.4% of Israelis opposed withdrawal from the occupied territories and 37.9% opposed any freeze of new settlements, although only 35.2% supported evacuating the existing settlements.

Lieutenant Colonel Yehuda Meir stated that Israeli soldiers policing Palestinian student demonstrations "see soldiers—without uniforms or ammunition, but if these students had ammunition they would use it. These Palestinian are not protesting for books or tuition. They are motivated to do what they do by a nationalist cause." On 17 April, Peace Now organised a press conference to denounce the closure of Birzeit with 50 Israeli and Palestinian figures, including David Zucker, Elazar Granot, Hanna Siniora, Ziad Abuzayyad, Mustafa Natshe, and Fayez Abu Rahmeh.

=== Internationally ===
In an editorial, The Australian Jewish News stated that "to let the disturbances on the West Bank halt the search for a Middle East settlement would be to surrender to extremists on both sides," further accusing the PLO of having incited the unrest.

In its October 1987 report, the United Nations Committee on the Exercise of the Inalienable Rights of the Palestinian People stated that it was "increasingly concerned at the fact that the situation in the occupied Palestinian territories had continued to deteriorate." According to the Committee, "Demonstrations and protests which spread throughout the territories during the period under review were met with armed force by Israeli troops on repeated occasions, resulting in the killing and wounding of unarmed civilians, including children. The Israeli authorities continued to impose a range of measures against suspected activists, particularly trade unionists, community and student leaders, journalists, and academics. Such measures included arrest, administrative detention for up to six months without charges or trial, town or house arrest, denial of permission to travel abroad, and deportation. The Committee was gravely concerned at repeated reports of torture, beatings and ill-treatment of Palestinian prisoners by Israeli security forces, despite appeals by human rights organizations and hunger strikes by thousands of prisoners. ... These repressive actions by the Israeli authorities were accompanied by a growing trend towards settler vigilantism, encroachment and provocation, which resulted in numerous violent incidents and further exacerbated tension in the area."

On 16 April, Permanent Representative of Jordan to the United Nations Abdullah Amin Salah sent a letter to the UN Secretary-General accusing Israel of violating international law with its settlements, saying that, during March 1987, "Israeli authorities confiscated 1,750 dunums in the occupied West Bank and laid the foundation stone for a new settlement city north of the city of Jerusalem. Jewish settlers damaged some 29 vehicles belonging to Arab citizens and uprooted some 667 olive trees in various parts of the occupied West Bank."

== Analysis ==
=== Effects on Israeli–Palestinian relations ===
Political scientist Meron Benvenisti, who had previously served as the deputy mayor of Jerusalem in the 1970s, stated that the unrest had "all the symptoms of a twilight war, an intercommunal strife that has nothing to do with diplomatic initiatives and that renders them totally superfluous," saying that it was not "the old notion of the Israeli-Arab conflict involving external forces and governments," but instead that "we are coming closer to a civil war of two competing nationalisms in the land west of the River Jordan." Glenn Frankel of the Washington Post stated that the unrest "further polarised the two sides and widened the gap of blood and history between them," saying that "neither side recognizes the legitimate claims of the other, nor even the other's humanity. Thus, for many young Palestinians, Ofra Moses was not a young mother seeking to raise her children in fresh surroundings, but a foe usurping their land. Likewise, to many Jewish settlers, Mousa Hanafi was not a gifted young student, but an enemy manipulated by terrorist elements."

In his 1989 book From Beirut to Jerusalem, American journalist Thomas L. Friedman wrote that, "in Israel and the occupied territories, civilians who died in any way remotely connected to the conflict were buried as martyrs and war heroes, and each community used these deaths to reaffirm the rightness of its cause and to justify revenge against the other. Palestinian and Israeli funerals were so similar it was uncanny. Each side stood over its coffins and drew out the old familiar slogans like pistols from a holster."

Sociologist Janet Aviad warned of "rhinocerosisation" among the majority of the population, saying that "your skin just keeps getting thicker and thicker, year after year, until you just stop noticing things. Twenty years ago the shooting of a Palestinian student or the firebombing of a settler would set everyone here on fire. Now most people just accept it. Events happen. They are written on your memory but you don't let the feelings sink in." Israeli author David Grossman warned that Israelis and Palestinians no longer saw each other when they ecnoutered each in public, saying that "I see through them and they see through us. We are both experts at it now. We don't want to feel or see anything because, if we start to feel we might have to come to some dangerous conclusions, which we very much want to avoid."

=== Effects on Israeli settlers ===
In the American Jewish Year Book, Ralph Mandel wrote that, as the hunger strike began in March 1987, "Jewish settlers were also increasingly restive because of the deteriorating security situation on roads in the territories," saying that measures taken by the IDF such as mass arrests of Palestinians and the erection of fences around Palestinian refugee camps "were scoffed at by the Jewish settlers. Whether they had moved to the territories for religio-ideological reasons, or had been lured there by material inducements in the form of inexpensive, heavily subsidized housing and the promise of suburban 'country living'—'five minutes from Kfar Sava,' as the slogan went—they kept up intense pressure on the security forces to take a hard line against Palestinian 'troublemakers.'" Mid-1987 would see a number of other settler riots in Palestinian towns, notably another riot in Qalqilya in May, during which Weiss declared that "we will not keep silent in the face of even a single stone, because every stone and every petrol bomb is an attempted murder," as well as the 1987 Dheisheh attack in June.

Dan Fisher of the Los Angeles Times stated that the unrest "reopened a debate in Israel over vigilante activity," saying that settlers were increasingly "taking the law into their own hands to protest what they call inadequate army protection" while noting that "Palestinians face tough and immediate punishment for disturbing order, while law-breaking Jewish settlers get off lightly if they are punished at all." Fisher further noted that the Israeli military claimed not to have the legal power to arreset Israeli citizens, including settlers, but did have the power to arrest Palestinians in the West Bank, who were subject to Israeli military law. Ian Black of The Guardian wrote that "it has long been clear that Israel's security can never be total and that force alone is not enough to maintain control over 1.4 million Arabs," saying that while lone wolf attacks like the one that killed Moses were extremely difficult to prevent, the Israeli military was "hard pressed to cope with the far more widespread phenomena of demonstrations, stone-throwing, and tire-burning that have become the national pastimes of a whole generation of young Palestinians." Black also wrote that "settler vigilantism and revenge" was just as much a problem for the Israeli government, warning that there was "a real threat of a civil war should an Israeli government ever prove able or willing to make territorial concessions in exchange for peace. And the settlers, like everyone else, serve in the army in what they call Judea and Samaria, which means that often the cat is guarding the cream."

In her 1994 book Identity Politics and Women: Cultural Reassertions and Feminisms in International Perspective, scholar Valentine Moghadam wrote that, for settler extremists, Moses's death was "more than another Israeli attacked by Palestinians, for a family had been attacked and the primary caregiver was killed. In the Gush Emunim worldview, with its politicisation of family life, the public-private distinction is less relevant and an assault on a mother required a strong vigilante response. Woman's domestic role became a ritualised public one for she was the mistress of the home, and those institutions most closely associated with the home such as education. By keeping Kashrut and the Sabbath she was the carried of the morality that makes public communal life possible. The Weiss-led rampage through Qalqilya was an attempt to protect the family, and by extension, the nation."

=== Effects on Palestinian society ===
Palestinian journalist Daoud Kuttab stated that Palestinian children "have grown up in a sense with the barrel of the gun over their noses. So from their limited point of view, they believe might is right, that if you have power you can rule the world. The Army may have the guns, but they have stones and they have numbers. The Army patrol may pass by every four hours, but for the rest of the time the kids rule the streets."

Writing in Time Magazine after his trip to the Middle East in March, former American president Jimmy Carter warned that the Palestinian leaders he met were "deeply embittered about the lack of progress in redressing their grievances, and concerned about increasing militancy among their young people. College-age students, never having known anything other than life under military occupation, now find their universities closed at least half the time because of demonstrations against Israeli troops. Their enforced idleness brings on more militant acts, creating a never-ending vicious cycle. The Palestinians discount King Hussein's efforts to improve their living conditions as doomed to failure because of inadequate funding and Israeli impediments. They are disillusioned with their leaders both within and outside the occupied territories, but even in private conversations they express overwhelming support for the P.L.O. leadership as their only legitimate spokesmen. Palestinians fear that some Arabs and some Israelis might never be willing to grant them their basic human rights."

Penny Johnson of Birzeit University described the spring unrest as "less a new stage of civil disobedience than a new phase in the history of mass resistance," saying that "both the prisoners’ strike and the support actions surrounding it reflected a new level of collective solidarity and action on a specific rights issue of great concern to the population," but that "the struggle for rights in the occupied territories is uneven, retarded currently by political fragmentation and a lack of a coordinated leadership, and thus difficult to sustain." In 2022, Lena Meari of Birzeit stated that the prisoners' hunger strike "contributed to the eruption of the First Intifada, during which the Palestinian captive movement, understood as a reflection of and motivator for the national movement, waged several hunger strikes."

== Aftermath ==
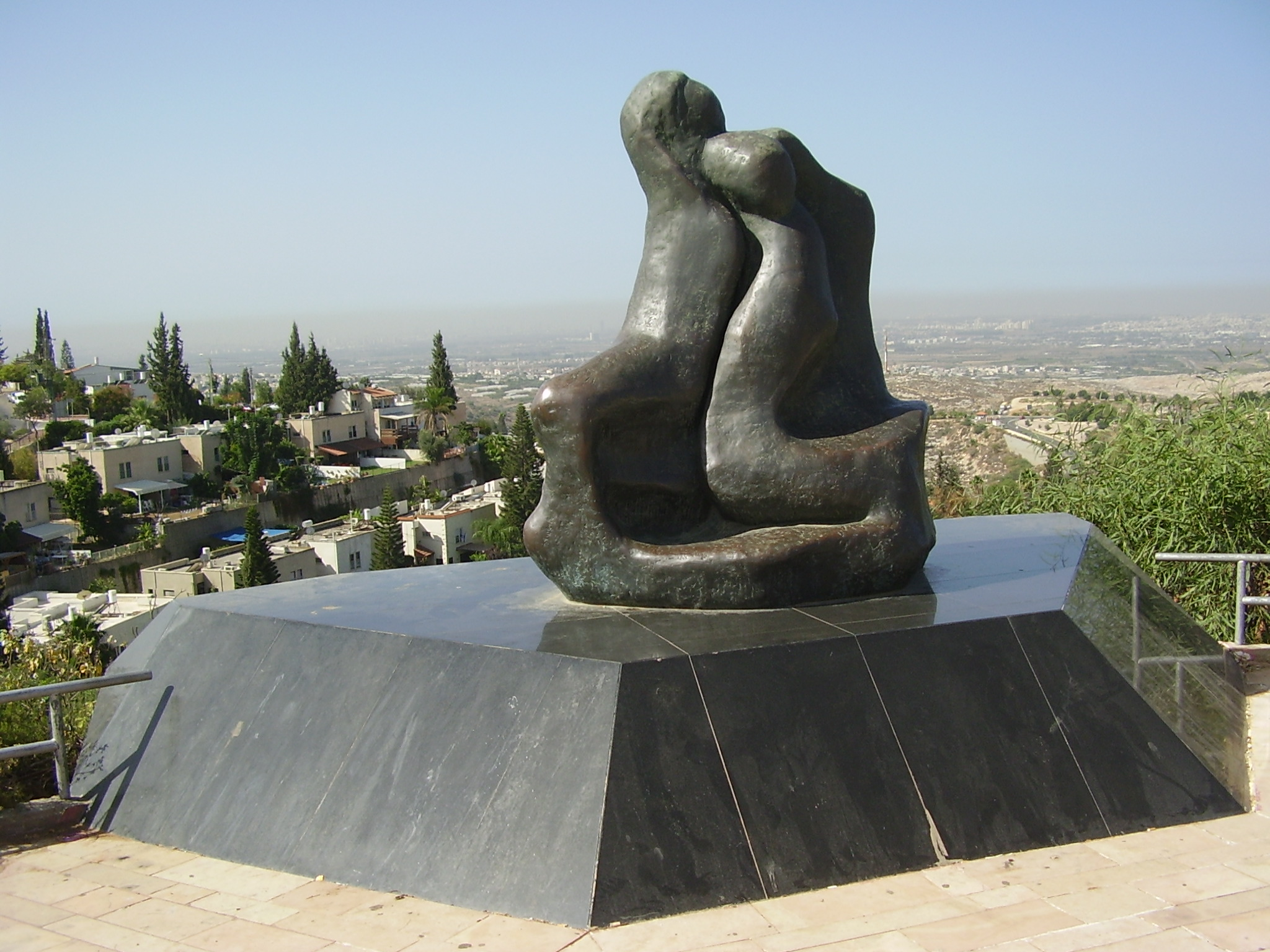
Memorial to Ofra and Tal Moses in Alfei Menashe.

Ofra and Tal Moses were buried next to each other in Petah Tikva. A eulogy at the funeral was delivered by Israeli Minister of Transport Haim Corfu, who stated that Moses "fell in the defence of the security of Jerusalem. You, Ofra, you are our soldier." Some controversy had been sparked when the Israeli government issued Moses' death certificate, stating that she had died outside of Israel, until Prime Minister Yitzhak Shamir intervened to order that Israelis who die in the West Bank should be registered as having died inside Israel.

Daoud would be convicted by a military court for the murders in 1989, as well as seven other charges of terrorism, including another incident of throwing a Molotov cocktail at a settler's car in August 1987, being sentenced to life imprisonment. In March 2014, the Israeli authorities refused to release him as part of the 2013–2014 Israeli–Palestinian peace talks. In 2020, the Palestinian Authority sparked controversy when it released a report that described Daoud as "heroic," claiming that "young Muhammad Daoud was beginning his path in life" in 1987 when "the occupation forces kidnapped him to be a prisoner in their prisons." Daoud was released from prison in October 2025, as part of the Gaza peace plan.

Moses' husband, Abraham, became an activist for victims of terrorism, co-founding the National Organisation of Victims of Terror, which provides post-trauma treatments and support for victims and their families. In 1989, he had called for the death penalty for Daoud, saying that "It is not a matter of revenge that I think capital punishment is the right punishment. It is a matter of justice." In a 2015 interview with The World, he indicated that he still supported the death penalty for terrorists in theory, but that he would rather support prisoner exchanges if they led to peace between Palestinians and Israelis. In the same interview, he revealed that Daoud's mother had sent him death threats in 1989 after he had called for capital punishment: "She gave me a call saying if they touch my son, I am going to kill you. I am going to finish the job that he didn't." Upon Daoud's release in 2025, he told the press that, despite him and his children being upset over the release, they could accept it so that the hostages held by Hamas would finally be reuinted with their families. In an interview with Ynet, he stated that "It's a difficult decision for our family, but I've said before—I have no problem as long as the hostages return home. I have no one left to hug, but the hostage families do. We are paying a heavy price, but the most important thing is that our people come home."

Daniella Weiss, who had led the settler riot following Moses' killing, was arrested for her involvement in the riot, being issued a six-month suspended sentence and a 2500 Israeli new shekel fine. She continued to play a prominent role in settler activism in the following decades, including founding the extremist Nachala movement and serving as Mayor of the Kedumim settlement.

Musa Hanafi was buried in his hometown of Rafah, in the Gaza Strip, with a Palestinian flag draped over is coffin in a funeral attended by 5000 people. His family had stolen his body from the morgue in Ramallah before it could be impounded by the Israeli authorities, and had smuggled it from the West Bank to Gaza for the funeral. The New York Times quoted a Birzeit graduate who attended the funeral as saying that "people praised Hanafi as a 'bridge to liberation.' It was a real push for new sacrifice. You could feel the anger in the young boys there. I was watching them. They had lost the smile of childhood. ... Everybody was ready to die."

Birzeit University was allowed to re-open in mid-August 1987, after four months of closure, the longest forced closure in the university's history at that point. Gabi Baramaki, the university's acting president, estimated that the university has lost at 750 000 dollars as a result of the closure. When the university re-opened, the Israeli military commander in the West Bank warned that if "the administration is not capable of controlling the students, and they continue to cause serious disturbances, I believe that the defence establishment will perhaps have no alternative but to close down the campus permanently," saying that he hoped that the university had "learned the lesson." The university, along with all other Palestinian universities, would be ordered closed again in January 1988, after the outbreak of the First Intifada, for a period of over four years.

Heightened unrest and violence in the Israeli–Palestinian conflict would continue through the rest of 1987. In December 1987, the largest wave of Palestinian unrest and rioting since the beginning of the Israeli occupation broke out across Palestine following the deaths of four Palestinian workers in a truck accident. The unrest would soon develop into a coordinated uprising against the Israeli occupation, known the First Intifada.

== See also ==
- February 1987 Palestinian unrest
- 1987 in Palestine
- 1987 in Israel
