= February 1987 Palestinian unrest =

1987 civil unrest

- Part of Israeli–Palestinian conflict
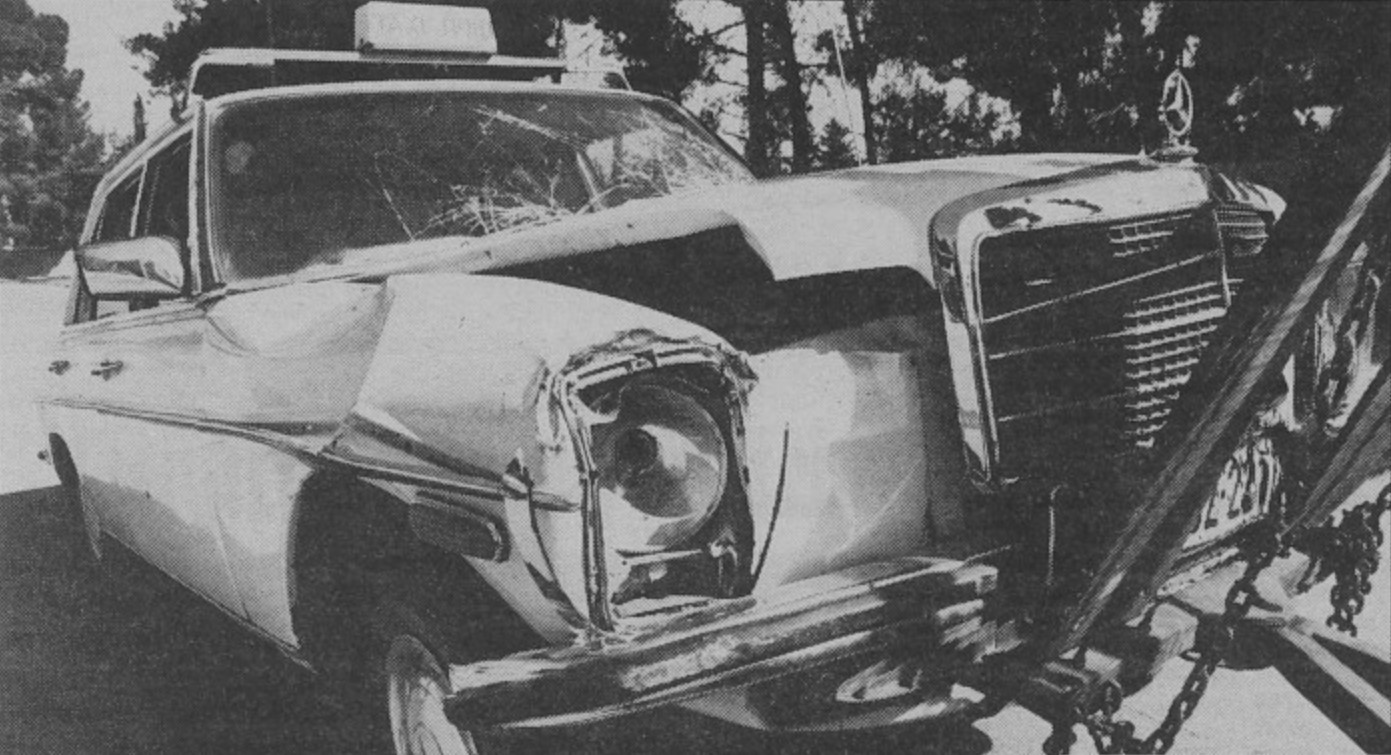
- Palestinian taxi that was driven into an Israeli military patrol in the Askar Camp on 18 February 1987. Two Israeli soldiers were injured and the taxi driver was shot and killed.
- Date: 9 February 1987 – 22 February 1987
- Location: West Bank and the Gaza strip
- Methods: Protest, political demonstration, strike action, stone throwing, grenade attack

The February 1987 Palestinian unrest was a wave of unrest across the West Bank and the Gaza strip in February 1987. The wave began on 9 February, with protests breaking out after Israeli soldiers used live ammunition to disperse a demonstration held at the Balata Camp, in the West Bank. The wave continued until late February, escalating into a grenade attack on an Israeli border post and the killing of a Palestinian cab driver who drove into an Israeli military patrol. During the unrest, all five major Palestinian universities were temporarily ordered closed by Israeli authorities.

== Background ==
Israel captured the West Bank and Gaza Strip during the Six-Day War in 1967 and placed both under military administration. By 1987, contemporary reporting described a generation of Palestinians who had been born or had come of age during the occupation and were increasingly central to local unrest.

1986 in Palestine had ended with a significant wave of unrest after two Birzeit University students were shot and killed by Israeli forces while protesting against a roadblock erected on the main road into the campus. Tensions in the Israeli–Palestinian conflict would continue to fester during the early weeks of 1987, although relatively calmly, including demolitions of Palestinian houses by Israeli authorities, deportations of Palestinian political figures, seizures of Palestinian land by Israeli authorities, the non-fatal stabbing of two Jewish brothers in the Old City of Jerusalem, the non-fatal shootings of several Palestinian protestors, the wounding of nine Israelis in a bus bombing, and the announcement of the charges in a case against four Israeli peace activists for holding a peace meeting with a group of moderate PLO members in November 1986. In late January 1987, Israeli Minister of Defence Yitzhak Rabin also threatened to permanently close Palestinian universities if they didn't take steps to prevent their students from participating in political demonstrations. Israeli settler violence and vigilantism was also becoming an increasing issue, particularly as the number of settlers had doubled in the last four years and were hotspots of far-right and Israeli ultranationalist sentiment.

== Events ==
On 9 February 1987, a demonstration was held by Palestinians in the Balata Camp, near Nablus in the West Bank, in protest over the siege of the Palestinian Shatila refugee camp in Lebanon by the Amal Movement. Israeli forces responded to the demonstration by attempting to forcibly disperse it, first using tear gas and rubber bullets and then live ammunition, injuring four of the demonstrators. One Israeli soldier was lightly injured after being hit by a thrown stone. As news of the shooting spread, students at the nearby An-Najah National University gathered to hold a demonstration protesting against the use of force to disperse the protest. Israeli forces then moved to forcibly disperse the student demonstration as well, injuring seven students. The Israeli military claimed that protestors at the two demonstrations had "endangered the lives of the soldiers," including by refusing to follow the soldiers' orders, throwing stones, throwing bottles, and raising Palestinian flags. A curfew was subsequently imposed on the Balata Camp and the military ordered An-Najah National University to be shut down for a period of one month.

The Israeli response to the 9 February demonstrations sparked a wave of protests across Palestine in the following days. The protests included rallies by An-Najah students on the university campus, despite the forced closure, secondary school student strikes, women's marches, commercial strikes, and demonstrations in Palestinian cities. Several further protests against the Shatila siege were also held, including a march by Birzeit University students and an artists' vigil in East Jerusalem.

Israeli soldiers moved to disperse several of the protests using tear gas, rubber bullets, and in some cases, live ammunition, and protestors at several demonstrations threw stones and bottles at Israeli soldiers and Israeli vehicles. By 15 February, at least seven Israeli soldiers had been injured by stones. On 10 February, an Israeli nighttime raid resulted in the arrests of around one hundred youth on charges of inciting the demonstrations. On 11 February, Israeli authorities ordered the al-Rawda College in Nablus closed for two weeks, placed thirty Balata Camp youth in administrative detention on charges of incitement and stone throwing, and shot and injured a Palestinian boy in Khan Yunis. On 14 February, eighteen Hebron University students were arrested at a protest held on the university campus. On 16 February, nine Palestinian youth were shot and injured by Israeli soldiers during demonstrations in Gaza City, and Israeli authorities ordered the Islamic University of Gaza shut down for three days. Also on 16 October, Birzeit University professor Roger Heacock was arrested by the Israeli military and charged with having incited a women's demonstration in Ramallah. On 17 February, a 16-year-old Palestinian girl was shot and injured when demonstrators in Khan Yunis threw stones at an Israeli military vehicle, and both Bethlehem University and Birzeit University were ordered closed for four days. During the course of the unrest, the Israeli military would declare some areas of the West Bank as closed military zones, blocking reporters from entering, and moved to punish shopkeepers who took part in commercial strikes by permanently welding shut the doors to their shops.

Some Israelis were also involved in actions related to the Israeli–Palestinian conflict during the period of unrest. On 10 February, a joint Israeli–Palestinian demonstration was held in Sur Baher, near East Jerusalem, in protest against plans by the Israeli government to tear down Palestinian-owned olive trees on land that the Israeli government had recently seized. On 11 February, a group of settlers from Gush Katif tried to blockade the main highway in the Gaza Strip. On 16 February, the Israeli Alternative Information Center NGO was raided by Israeli police, being ordered shut down for six months and having its director, Michel Warschawski, arrested on charges of aiding the Popular Front for the Liberation of Palestine.

The last stages of the period of unrest were marked by two more violent incidents. On 18 February, a Palestinian cab driver was shot and killed by Israeli soldiers after driving into an Israeli patrol in the Askar Camp, injuring two soldiers. The Israeli military claimed the incident was a deliberate vehicle-ramming attack, while some Palestinian eye-witnesses claimed that it had been accidental, with the cab driver swerving to try to avoid hitting protestors who were throwing stones at the patrol. On 22 February, a grenade was thrown at an Israeli border post at the Damascus Gate in Jerusalem, injuring twelve Israeli soldiers, two Israeli civilians, and three Palestinian civilians, most with light injuries. The PLO claimed responsibility for the attack, the most serious attack in Jerusalem since October 1986. Seventy Palestinians were subsequently detained by Israeli forces for interrogation over the attack.

Some protests would continue throughout the next days of February, including a shopkeepers strike in Gaza City in protest over arrests of Palestinian university students, however, the wave of unrest mostly subsided. During this period, Israeli authorities would order Hebron University closed for three weeks and Al-Azhar University – Gaza closed for ten days, the later after having had to force open the campus gates to disperse a student demonstration. On 21 February, the Gaza Trade Union of Carpenters and Construction Workers would also hold the first union election in the Gaza Strip in twenty years, despite the Israeli authorities having banned the union from holding the election.

== Analysis ==
Glenn Frankel of The Washington Post suggested that there was "a shift in the nature of the struggle here," moving away from a conflict between the Israeli military and "professional terrorists imported from outside the West Bank" towards a conflict that centred around incidents that were "initiated locally, most of them by Palestinian youths." Penny Johnson of Birzeit University argued that some commentators "exaggerate the novelty of the forms of protest—many have been employed by Palestinians in the occupied territories during the last two decades," but that the commentators "rightly emphasise the re-emergence of mass mobilisation" among the Palestinian population. Johnson also argued that the Israeli military's response to the unrest was not just "a response to growing unrest (which in itself is an outgrowth of Rabin's "iron fist" policy, among other factors). Instead, military policy has been informed by political objectives, and army actions toward universities are one of the most striking examples."

== Aftermath ==
A larger wave of unrest would break out in the West Bank in late March 1987, including a Palestinian prisoners' hunger strike, the killing of an Israeli settler, and the killing of a Birzeit University student. Tensions in the Israeli–Palestinian conflict would continue to increase through mid to late 1987, ultimately culminating in the breakout of the First Intifada in December, the largest wave of protests, strikes, boycotts, and acts of civil disobedience by Palestinians since the beginning of the Israeli occupation in 1967.

Alternative Information Center director Michel Warschawski's trial on aiding the Popular Front for the Liberation of Palestine would last until 1989, when he would be found guilty of having printed a booklet authored by the PFLP on how to endure Israeli torture techniques. He was sentenced to twenty months incarceration, which he served in the Maasiyahu Prison.

== See also ==
- 1987 in Palestine
