= Tomorrow's Youth Organization =

US service organization in Middle East

- Founded: August 2007 by Hani Masri in the United States
- Type: Non-profit; NGO
- Headquarters: Washington DC, United States
- Location: Global
- Services: Protecting human rights
- Fields: Education, Women's Empowerment, Children's Rights
- Website: www.tomorrowsyouth.org

Tomorrow's Youth Organization (TYO) is an American, non-governmental organization that works in disadvantaged areas of the Middle East, doing community service and charitable work for children, youth and parents. Its flagship centre is located in the Khallet al Amood neighbourhood in Nablus in the Palestinian Territories. It primarily services the refugee camps of Balata, Askar, and El-Ain.

== History ==
It was founded in by Hani Masri who grew up in the Balata refugee camp. He is currently based in the US and known for his advocacy of the Middle East peace process and children's issues.

== Current Involvement ==
TYO has a permanent staff of 12 employees, which are Palestinian, American, and other nationalities. It actively recruits American students to volunteer and work at the centre in Nablus.

== International Support ==
It is supported by the likes of Cherie Blair, Quincy Jones, and Bill Clinton.
