= Birzeit University student elections =

Elections to the student council of Birzeit University play an important role in Palestinian politics each year.

== Background ==
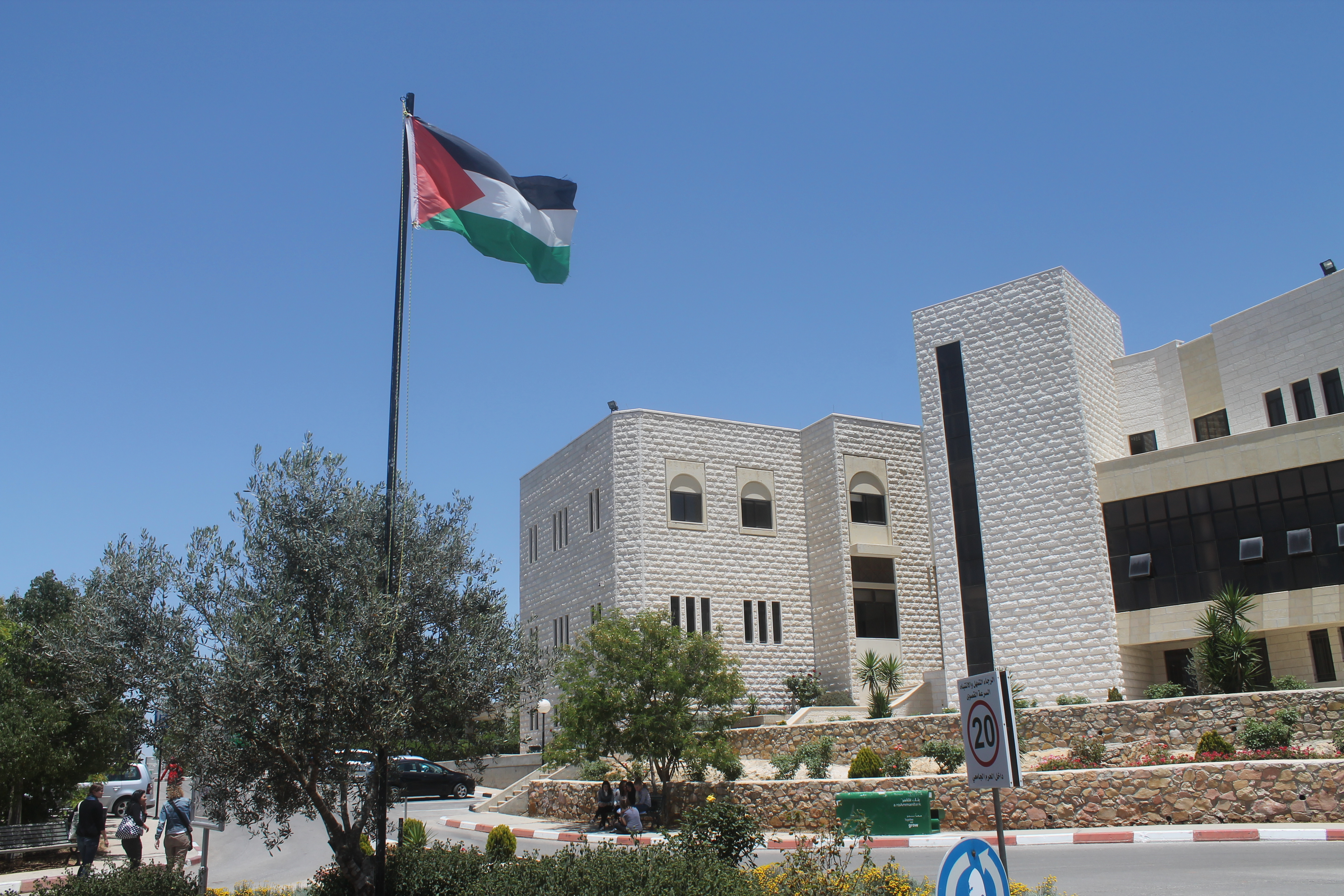
Birzeit University in 2013

Birzeit University is a public university in Birzeit, a Palestinian Christian town near Ramallah in the West Bank. The university is considered one of the best universities in Palestine and the Middle East in international university rankings. The university has a frequent centre of Palestinian nationalism, seeing a significant number of protests, strikes, and clashes between its students and Israeli forces through its history.

Elections to student councils at Palestinian universities are widely considered to be important for Palestinian society, both because of the role universities and student movements play in Palestinian society and because other democratically run elections have rarely been held. Following a significant PLO victory in the 1976 West Bank local elections, the Israeli government disbanded many Palestinian city councils and indefinitely postponed further elections. The next elections to be held in Palestine would be the 1996 Palestinian general election, following the establishment of the Palestinian Authority, which last held elections in 2006, with the PA refusing to hold further elections due to the Fatah–Hamas conflict. According to Shatha Hammad of Middle East Eye, "Birzeit University elections are considered as the bellwether of West Bank politics. It's one of the most important political events in Palestinian society, especially since the university is one of the largest education institutions in the West Bank and maintains its independence from the control of the Palestinian Authority. The results of these elections are read as a reflection of wider Palestinian society, its position on the PA, and voters' orientations in any broader elections that may be held in the future."

== History ==
=== 1970s - 1993 ===
In the elections for 1993, the first elections to be held since the university was allowed to re-open after being forcibly closed by the Israeli government since 1987, the three largest PLO-affiliated campus blocs (Fatah, the PFLP, and DFLP) agreed to run a joint list in the election. The joint-PLO bloc subsequently won a significant victory, winning almost two-thirds of the vote. The Hamas-affiliated bloc finished in second place, with around one third of the vote.

=== 1994 elections ===
In 1994, a referendum was held on changing the electoral system from first-past-the-post to proportional representation. The change to proportional representation won 74% of the vote, on a turnout of 49%.

According to Khalid Farraj, who had been a student organiser at the university throughout the First Intifada, in 1994 "the media paid unparalleled attention to the student council elections that year; besides the actual results, news outlets focused on the campaigning process itself, including the debates and political slogans deployedoneveryside. CNN and the BBC,as well as foreign news agencies and TV channels all set up shop inside the university to film what was widely considered a historic election." During the 1994 elections, two opposing blocs faced each other: the "Jerusalem and Statehood" bloc, composed of Fatah and other pro-Oslo Accords groups, and the "Jerusalem First," an coalition of anti-Oslo Accords groups led by Hamas, and including the Palestinian Islamic Jihad, as well as the two main Palestinian communist factions, the Popular Front for the Liberation of Palestine and the Democratic Front for the Liberation of Palestine. The Jerusalem First coalition was marked with internal instability and arguments between the Islamist and communist factions, notably over the distribution of seats, the role women would play in the campaign, and over whether the bloc should support liberalising the university.

According to Rita Giacaman of Birzeit University:

"the oppositional 'Jerusalem First' coalition made a striking spectacle as hundreds of its supporters marched smartly across the university’s hilltop campus. In a prominent position at the head of the march, female students from the Popular Front, clad in blue jeans, brandished red-splattered rocks, while young men held banners against self-government. At the end of the march, “sisters” from Hamas walked as a segregated bloc. To the surprise of some observers, several young women were not wearing the obligatory headscarf. One bare-headed woman waved a green Hamas banner high overhead. In the middle, young women partisans of the Democratic Front (Hawatmeh) in casual Western attire mixed uneasily with Hamas men.
This scene, this coalition, depicts the unstable mix of gender and politics in Palestine today. The era ushered in by the signing of the Declaration of Principles pushes women activists to unite in order to safeguard women’s interests, while at the same time it pulls them apart in the most profound split Palestinian politics has encountered to date. Inside the women’s movement, the atmosphere has been steadily growing more tense as women struggle to maintain the gender-based coordination of the past several years in the face of radical political polarization. PLO leaders from abroad are sometimes referred to as the “abus” (fathers), underlining the one common and persistent fear of women activists: that any gains by women in general, or as political leaders, will be ignored by the patriarchal character of the coming authority."

Khaled Abu Jaber, the leader of the campus Fatah group, argued that the election reflected general frustration about "the absence of changes on the ground" in the Oslo Accords, and that "Birzeit feels everything more acutely and even in advance of the rest of our people, and these results are more a warning to the PLO and to the Israelis that results are needed to bring this agreement to life. Otherwise, the Palestinian people will reject it." Birzeit Dean of Student Affairs Mohammad Shtayyeh echoed the sentiment, saying that Birzeit students were usually "in advance of public opinion among Palestinians as a whole - that is, there is an opportunity to halt and reverse this trend."

In 2019, Farraj wrote that he had supported the Jerusalem First bloc, but that he now considered it "a strategic mistake," which "provided the Islamists with a foothold at Birzeit, allowing them to maintain their dominance and to win a significant number of elections since."

=== 2015 - present: Hamas dominance ===
Beginning in the 2015 student elections, Hamas-affiliated blocs have become the leading blocs in the student council elections, winning almost every single election since then. Hani al-Masri of Masarat - The Palestinian Center for Policy Research & Strategic Studies has attributed this rise to dominance to the wider political context of frustrations with the Palestinian Authority, as well as the campus context of Fatah-affiliated blocs suffering from a lack of internal cohesion and leadership that has been too loyalist to the central Fatah leadership instead of the student Fatah membership, and repeated arrests of the Islamist bloc members by Israel, giving them a boost in sympathy.

No elections were held in 2020 and 2021 due to the COVID-19 pandemic.

The 2022 elections were seen as one of the most significant victories for Hamas in the university's history, as the group won by the largest margin of victory in its history and winning over 50% of the popular vote for the first time. Rafat al-Sweiti of the campus Fatah faction attributed the loss to recent actions by the Fatah-controlled Palestinian Authority, including the killing of human rights activist Nizar Banat and strikes by PA-employed workers over low wages, saying that "a student here does not differentiate between us as a Fatah group and the PA."

== Results ==
Year	Turnout	Nationalist bloc	Marxist bloc	Islamist bloc	Result
2023	77,5%	39%	12%	49%	Hamas-affiliated bloc victory
2022	78,1%	35%	9%	52%	Hamas-affiliated bloc victory
2021	Cancelled (Note: Cancelled due to the COVID-19 pandemic.)				
2020	Cancelled (Note: Cancelled due to the COVID-19 pandemic.)				
2019	76,4%	45%	10%	44%	Fatah-affiliated bloc victory
2018	74,6%	45%	8%	47%	Hamas-affiliated bloc victory
2017	74%	42%	8%	47%	Hamas-affiliated bloc victory
2015	77%	37%	10%	50%	Hamas-affiliated bloc victory
2013	76%	46%	13%	39%	Fatah-affiliated bloc victory

== See also ==
- Birzeit University closures
