= Ibdaa Cultural Center =

Project in Dheisheh refugee camp, West Bank

Ibdaa Cultural Center is a grassroots community-based project in the West Bank's Palestinian Dheisheh refugee camp. The name, "Ibdaa" (ابداع), is translated from Arabic as "creation" or "creative ability". Ibdaa Cultural Center was established in 1994 and since then has served more than 1,200 children and youth annually and provides employment and income for more than 70 families in the refugee camp.

== Documentary film ==
A thirty-minute documentary released in 2002 and entitled "The Children of Ibdaa: To Create Something Out of Nothing" focuses on the Ibdaa Cultural Center's children's dance troupe. A tour followed the documentary's release.
