= 1987 Dheisheh attack =

Israeli settler attack

The 1987 Dheisheh attack was an attack by Israeli settlers on the Palestinian refugee camp of Dheisheh, in the West Bank, on 6 June 1987.

== Background ==
Dheisheh (Arabic: مخيم الدهيشة) is a Palestinian refugee camp located just south of Bethlehem in the West Bank. Dheisheh was established in 1949 on 0.31 square kilometers of land leased from the Jordanian government. The camp was established as a temporary refuge for 3,400 Palestinians from 45 villages west of Jerusalem and Hebron displaced in the 1948 Palestinian expulsion and flight which occurred during the 1948 Palestine war. The camp had a population of 8,805 in 2017.

== Events ==
Around 22:00 on 6 June, around 70 armed settlers, mostly from Kiryat Arba, attacked the Dheisheh refugee camp. During the attack, the settlers blocked the Jerusalem-Hebron highway, stopping and physically assaulting Palestinians trying to travel along the highway, fired bullets at buildings inside the camp, threw stones, and vandalised cars. The settlers stated that the attack was carried out in retaliation for an incident earlier in the week when a Palestinian threw a stone at a settler bus passing the camp, injuring a settler's jaw.

Following the attack, the Israeli military imposed a curfew on the camp. The military also carried out a raid on the camp aimed at preventing stone throwing, conducting searches of the residents houses and interrogating all boys and men over the age of thirteen. The military would subsequently extend the fence surrounding the camp to prevent stone throwing, eventually lifting the curfew on 11 June.

Thirteen settlers were arrested by the Israeli authorities for their participation in the attack on 8 June. Seven of them were charged with holding a demonstration without a permit and of stone throwing, while the other six faced more serious charges, including disobeying the military's orders and attacking soldiers. All of the thirteen were released on a 55 000 Israeli new shekel bail by 17 June.

== Reactions ==
=== Israeli government reaction ===
The attack was widely condemned by top Israeli government officials. Israeli President Chaim Herzog warned that settler vigilantism was a "dangerous phenomenon." Minister of Defence Yitzhak Rabin described the attack as "a scandal of top magnitude." Israeli Minister of Foreign Affairs Shimon Peres described it as "irresponsible and unacceptable." Minister of Industry and Trade Ariel Sharon, on the other hand, stated that "security for Jews is the sole responsibility of the government, but it should be clear that responsibility is not only expressed in words, but by eradicating terrorism."

=== Israeli press reaction ===
According to Joel Greenberg of The Jerusalem Post, the attack "stirred much internal debate in the settler community, which this week appeared torn between those seeking to project a moderate image, or who genuinely disapproved of the act, and those who opposed any criticism of the rampage, which they saw as understandable, if not justified." According to Yehuda Litani of The Jerusalem Post, "settlers hold that the Israeli Army does not provide them with adequate security." The settler Yesha Council condemned the attack, but called for the Israeli military to enact stricter security policies in the West Bank. A group of settlers formed a committee to campaign in support of the arrest thirteen settlers. The committee members included Gush Emunim figure Moshe Levinger, lawyer Elyakim Haetzni, and writer Naomi Frankel. Israeli ultranationalist Meir Kahane called for Israelis to "plant bombs at Dheisheh" and become heroes.

Jonathan Frankel of the Hebrew University of Jerusalem argued that "over the past twenty years, Israel has been creating a pogrom situation in the West Bank" as a result of "a policy of making one concession after another to the extreme nationalists grouped around Moshe Levinger and other leaders of the radical right," claiming that settlers involved in attacks on Palestinians "often received remarkably light sentences, and many of them have had their terms in prison reduced by the president," and that "the occupation is undermining our democratic system, eroding the best in Jewish values and making a mockery of Zionism." Writer Chaim Bermant also described the attack as a "pogrom," further arguing that "Likud, which was thought of, not so long ago, as the last word in right-wing extremism, and even as neo-fascist, has now become a middle-of-the-road party, not because it has changed its attitudes, but because many electors have changed theirs."

According to Yehuda Litani of The Jerusalem Post, "the Israel-Arab conflict rapidly is becoming internal, rather than an external," saying that the Israeli military's role "now revolves largely around safeguarding main roads, protecting Israeli buses and preventing demonstrations, rather than securing the borders and training the army for the next war." Litani further predicted that "the internal struggle is just beginning. So far, it has been confined to camps in the West Bank, but tomorrow it may spill over into Nablus, Gaza and Ramallah. And who knows where it will go from there?"

=== Israeli public reaction ===
A Teleseker poll found that around 38% of Israelis supported the attack, with 25% opposing the attack.

== See also ==
- Israeli settler violence
- Spring 1987 West Bank unrest
