= Dheisheh =

West Bank refugee camp south of Bethlehem

Dheisheh Camp
- Refugee Camp

Arabic transcription(s)
  - Arabic: مخيم الدهيشه
  - Latin: ad Duheisha Camp (official); Dheishe Camp (unofficial)
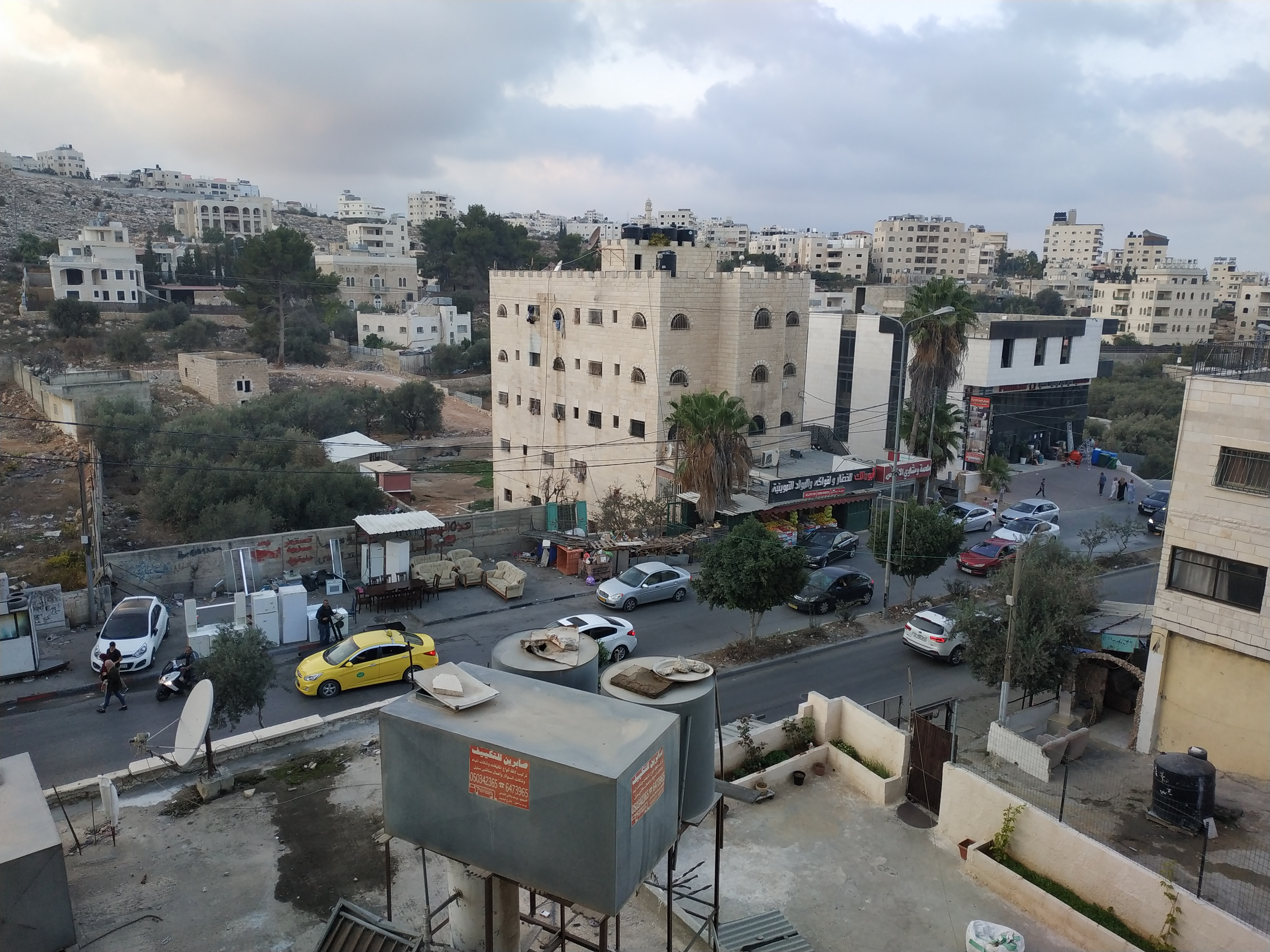
- Dheisheh Camp, 2018

- Location of Dheisheh Camp within Palestine
- Coordinates: 31°41′38″N 35°11′3″E
- State: State of Palestine
- Governorate: Bethlehem

Government
  - Type: Refugee Camp (from 1949)

Area (approximate)
  - Total: 1 km^{2} (0.39 sq mi)

Population (2017)
  - Total: 8,805
  - Density: 8,800/km^{2} (23,000/sq mi)

Dheisheh (Arabic: مخيم الدهيشة) is a Palestinian refugee camp located just south of Bethlehem in the West Bank. Dheisheh was established in 1949 on 0.31 square kilometers of land leased from the Jordanian government. The camp was established as a temporary refuge for 3,400 Palestinians from 45 villages west of Jerusalem and Hebron displaced in the 1948 Palestinian expulsion and flight which occurred during the 1948 Palestine war. The camp had a population of 8,805 in 2017.

Six decades of natural population growth have expanded the camp's dimensions into an area between 1 and 1.5 square kilometers. The exact dimensions are subject to periodic debate between residents, UNRWA and the Palestinian Authority. The latter two are required to provide services to residents, depending on their resident status within the camp.

Although initially living in tents, the residents have since constructed homes. Many streets are now paved, while still remaining very narrow. According to UNRWA, the entire camp is connected to the municipal water and electric systems of Bethlehem, yet 15% of the camp remains unconnected to the local public sewage system. These homes make use of communal percolation pits.

== Name ==
There are several alternative transliterations of the Arabic name "دهيشة", including "Deheishe", "Deheisheh", "Duheisha", "Dheisha", and "Dhaisha". "Dheisheh" is the spelling UNRWA uses.

== History ==
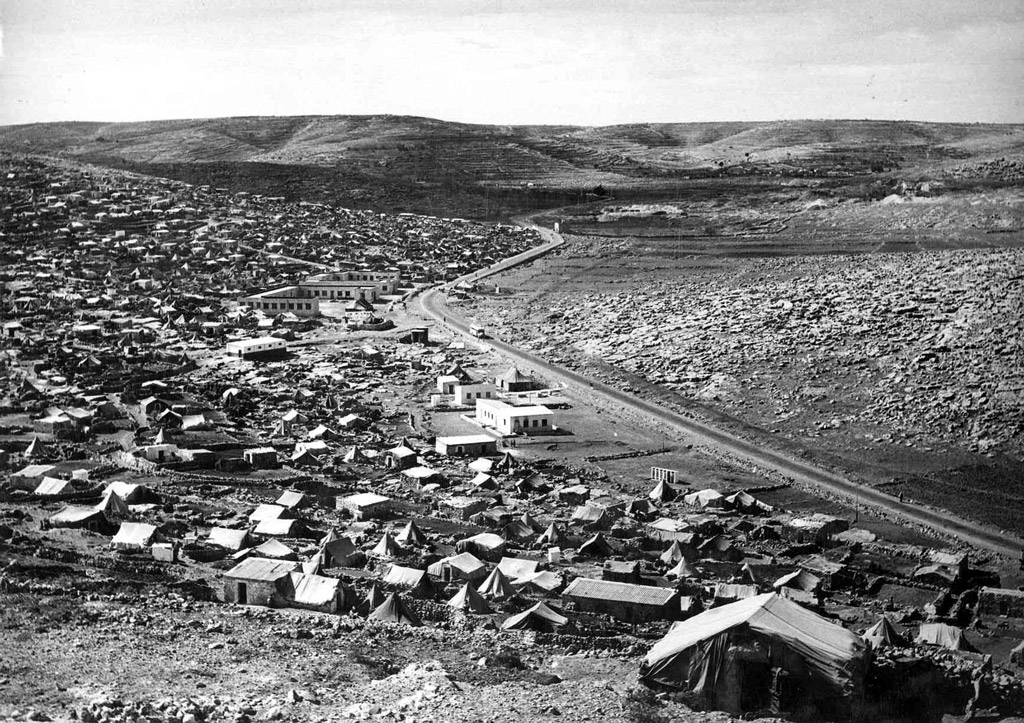
Dheisheh refugee camp in 1952

The Dheisheh refugee camp was established after the 1948 Palestine war, to accommodate those displaced in the 1948 Palestinian expulsion and flight. The camp was built on land that had been owned by a subsidiary of the Jewish National Fund. The people who gathered in Dheisheh originated from more than 45 villages west of Jerusalem and Hebron.

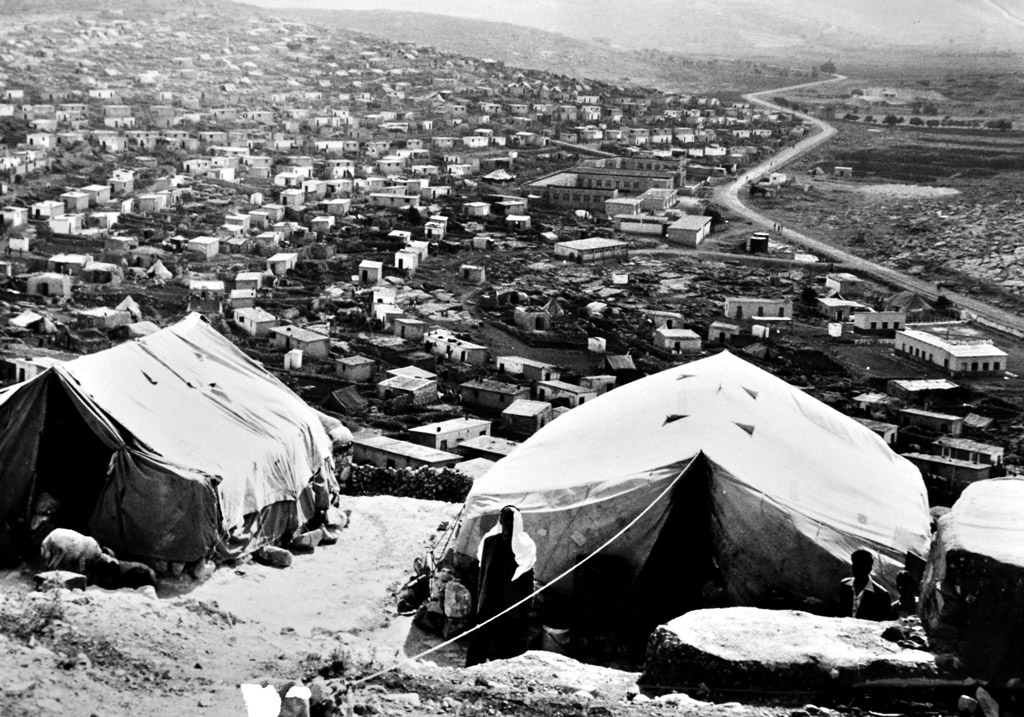
Photo of the camp in 1959

Towards the end of the 1950s the UNRWA started to build very simple living units: A single room of 10 square metres, 10 cm thick and 2.45 m high walls, a steel roof and a floor made of rough concrete. Refugees began to build their own houses so as not to live in the UNRWA's shacks any longer.

Since the Six-Day War in 1967, Dheisheh has been under Israeli occupation. During the years between Israeli occupation in 1967 and the camp coming under Palestinian Authority jurisdiction in 1995, Dheisheh was under curfew an average of 3.5 days a month, at one point lasting for 84 consecutive days. Throughout the First Intifada, a six-metre high barbed wire fence was installed around the camp, and thirteen of the camp's fourteen entrances were barricaded.

On 6 June 1987, Israeli settlers attacked the refugee camp. In response, the Israeli military imposed a curfew on the camp. Two days later on 8 June, thirteen settlers were arrested over the incident.

On 15 April 1989, during the early months of First Intifada, Imad Karaka was shot dead by Israeli soldiers. The following day the army broke up a group of youths gathered outside Karaka's home. During the incident Nasser Ibrahim Elkassas, aged 16, was shot in the back and died shortly afterwards. Because of the curfew Elkassas' funeral was held in Atras. It was here that a soldier shot bystander Rufaida Khalil Abu Laban, a 14-year-old girl. She died almost immediately. In March the following year Defense Minister Yitzhak Rabin wrote to MK Yair Tsaban stating that the incident occurred when an army patrol tried to disperse a curfew-breaking riot; they ran out of rubber bullets and the sergeant in command fired two plastic bullets, "deviating from operational orders", one of which killed the girl. The Military Advocate General recommended that the battalion commander "give him a severe dressing down for deviating from orders." A medical examination found that Rufaida had been shot in the back of the head at close range.

On 23 February 2015, during an operation to arrest a resident of the camp, Israeli soldiers shot dead a 19-year-old man.

Majed Faraj, the Palestinian Authority's chief of General Intelligence since 2009, was born in Deheisha Camp in 1962. He is a long time member of Fatah. He first experienced an Israeli prison at the age of 15 and has spent a total of six years in Israeli custody. His father was shot dead by the IDF in April 2002 during Operation Defensive Shield.

== Population ==
The population in the 1967 census conducted by the Israeli authorities was 4,149.

Current population figures for Dheisheh are subject to disagreement between the respective census studies of the Palestinian National Authority and UNRWA. According to the Palestinian Central Bureau of Statistics, the camp was estimated to have population of 9,399 in mid-year 2006, following natural population growths from 8,829 persons in 2004 and 9,114 persons in 2005. In January 2009, the Population, Housing, and Establishment Census 2007, undertaken by the same Palestinian Central Bureau of Statistics, on behalf of the Palestinian National Authority, reported the following statistics for the year 2007:

Demographic type	Total
No. of total persons	8,736
No. of females	4,310
No. of males	4,426
No. of housing units	1,905
No. of buildings	1,170
No. of households	1,698
Average size of household:	5.1

Of note is the absence of approximately 700 persons from the estimated 2006 figure compared to the 2007 reported figure. Also, the 2007 reported figure is less than the initial figured reported by the Palestinian Central Bureau of Statistics for 2004.

UNRWA reported the following statistical figures for Dheisheh, as of 30 June 2008:

Demographic type	Total
No. of total persons	13,017
No. of families	2,838
No. of infants	129

The discrepancy regarding the camp's population is influenced by several issues, most significant of which are the disagreements over the accepted dimensions of the camp and the status of unregistered residents. Residents of the camp are not taxed on their properties within the camp, and this results in disagreements as the camp community's population and geographical size continue to grow. The tax policy regarding the camp has resulted in the immigration of Palestinians who are not registered refugees with UNRWA. Accurate figures for these immigrants is non available.

Additionally, registration with UNRWA is voluntary and thus can not be expected to account for all eligible refugees living within the camp.

Based on the UNRWA statistics, Dheisheh is the fourth largest refugee camp in the West Bank, behind Balata, Tulkarm, and Askar (in that order). Dheisheh is thus the largest camp outside of UNRWA's Nablus district.

By comparison, Dheisheh camp would be the sixth largest after Balata, Askar, Tulkarm, Jenin, and Qalandiya (in that order), based on the figures reported by the Palestinian Central Bureau of Statistics.

== Local organizations ==
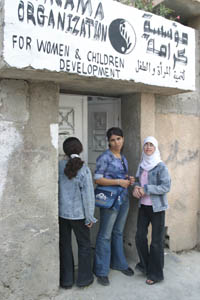
Entrance to the Karama Organization

A number of local as well as international organizations offer humanitarian services within Dheisheh camp. Many of these organizations have a particular focus. A few of them are listed above.

The Karama Organization is a local organization aiming at providing leisure activities for children living in the camp.

The Ibdaa Cultural Center has the aim of creating a positive atmosphere for children in the camp.

The Future Vision Society for the Development of the Abilities (AREEN) is another organization located in Dheishe camp. This non-profit organization seeks to provide a better future for the children and youth in the camp, especially for girls.

The armed wing of the Palestinian Marxist–Leninist organization, the Popular Front for the Liberation of Palestine's Abu Ali Mustafa Brigades, maintains a branch in Dheisheh, which is known as the Dheisheh camp guards.

== See also ==
- 'Azza
- Aida Camp
- Al-Arroub (camp)
