= Jonathan Frankel =

British historian and writer (1935–2008)

- Born: July 15, 1935; London, United Kingdom
- Died: May 7, 2008 (aged 72); Jerusalem
- Education: Jesus College, Cambridge
- Occupations: Historian; Professor
- Employer(s): Hebrew University of Jerusalem (1964–2004); University College London; Columbia University; Stanford University
- Known for: Scholar of modern Jewry; Prophecy and Politics (1981); The Damascus Affair (1997)
- Notable work: Prophecy and Politics: Socialism, Nationalism and the Russian Jews, 1862–1917 (1981); The Damascus Affair (1997)
- Spouse: Edith Rogovin (m. 1963)
- Children: 2 daughters

Jonathan Frankel (July 15, 1935 – May 7, 2008) was a historian and writer. He was a lecturer at the Hebrew University of Jerusalem from 1964 to 1985, and a professor between 1985 and 2004.

== Influence ==
Frankel was an influential historian of modern Jewry based on reports of his death in newspaper obituaries.The Independent referred to Frankel as “the most highly regarded historian of modern Jewry of his generation” (Steven Zipperstein, The Independent); The Times called him “arguably the greatest historian of modern Jewry of his generation” (The Times); and The Guardian wrote that he was “a brilliant historian of Russian and Jewish history” (David Cesarani, The Guardian,).

Frankel contributed to the historiography of East European Jewish life with his book Prophecy and Politics: Socialism, Nationalism, and the Russian Jews, 1862–1917 (1982), which became a classic at the moment of its publication. This work approached Jewish history of the nineteenth and early twentieth century from a completely new perspective.

He is credited with having "helped establish the Department of Russian and Slavic Studies" at Hebrew University of Jerusalem and the study of modern Jewish politics.

== Family ==
Frankel married Edith Rogovin in 1963; their marriage resulted in two daughters.

== Books ==
- Vladimir Akimov on the Dilemmas of Russian Marxism 1895–1903: The Second Congress of the Russian Social Democratic Labour Party. Cambridge University Press, 1969
- Prophecy and Politics: socialism, nationalism and the Russian Jews, 1862–1917. Cambridge University Press, 1984, 1984. – 686 pages (translated into Hebrew, Italian and Russian)
- The Damascus Affair: 'Ritual Murder', Politics, and the Jews in 1840. Cambridge University Press, 1997. – 491 pages. – ISBN 0-521-48396-4
  (Review / Middle East Quarterly, Volume 13 / September 1, 1998) (translated into Hebrew).
- Social Radicalism: "Jewish Socialism" and Jewish Labour Movement in Eastern Europe, Open University of Israel, 2007 (in Hebrew)
- Crisis, Revolution, and Russian Jews. Cambridge University Press, 2009

=== Other works ===
- Jonathan Frankel, Jewish politics and the Russian Revolution of 1905, Tel-Aviv, Tel Aviv University, 1982 (21 pages)

== Obituaries ==
- Steven J. Zipperstein, "Remembering Our Colleagues: Jonathan Frankel (1935 - 2008)," Association for Jewish Studies, January 2008.
- Vladimir Levin, Professor Jonathan Frankel (1935–2008), Journal East European Jewish Affairs, Volume 38, Issue 3, December 2008, pp. 251–252.
- Semion Gol’din and Vladimir Levin, "In memoriam of Jonathan Frankel," in: Arkhiv evreiskoi istorii, Vol. 5 (2008), pp. 347–351 (in Russian).
- Eli Lederhendler, "In Memoriam: Jonathan Frankel, 1935–2008," American Jewish History, July 2009, 94 (3), pp. 225–227.
- Jonathan Frankel – Thought-provoking contributor to Jewish and Russian history
- Professor Jonathan Frankel: Historian of Russia and modern Jewry
