= 1987 Arab League summit =

Meeting of Arab regional organization

16th Arab League Summit
- Host country: Jordan
- Date: November 8, 1987
- Cities: Amman
- Chair: King Hussein

The 1987 Arab League summit was held on 8 November in Amman as the sixteenth Arab League Summit.
