= Nizar Banat =

Palestinian activist (1978–2021)

- نزار بنات
- Born: Nizar Khalil Muhammad Banat; 27 August 1978; As-Salt
- Died: 24 June 2021 (aged 42); Hebron
- Cause of death: Violence leading to death
- Burial place: Dura, Hebron
- Citizenship: State of Palestine
- Occupations: Human rights defender Political movement Carpentry
- Known for: Anti-Palestinian authority activist

Nizar Khalil Muhammad Banat (Abu Kifah; 1978 – 24 June 2021) was a Palestinian political activist and human rights defender. He was one of the most prominent activists opposing the Palestinian Authority (PA), criticizing its policies and officials, whom he described as corrupt. Banat was the head of the Freedom and Dignity List. He died after his arrest by a squad of PA security forces, according to medical reports.

== Activism and Palestinian Authority response ==
He is best known for his anti-government videos that he posted on social media, addressing corruption and human rights violations. Amira Hass and Jack Khoury, writing in Haaretz, indicate that Banat not only criticized Abbas' government, but also received funds from Abbas' opponent Mohammed Dahlan, whose supporters are linked to Israeli intelligence circles.

The PA arrested him several times on charges of insulting national sentiment, assaulting the PA, and inciting strife against the PA on Facebook.

His house was attacked by security elements after he called on the European Union to cut aid to the PA, due to the postponement of the 2021 Palestinian legislative elections, a process denounced by the European Union on 2 May 2021 on its official account on Twitter. "The Union Commission in Palestine is following with concern the attack [on] the home of activist Nizar Banat was targeted in the town of Dura, in the southern West Bank. Violence against politicians and human rights defenders is unacceptable", the tweet reads.

== Death ==
On 24 June 2021, at about 3:30 a.m. a Palestinian Preventive Security force stormed his house in the Hebron Governorate in the southern West Bank to arrest him. At 6:45 a.m., the Palestinian Authority officially announced his death. His family accused the PA of assassinating him with premeditation, while sources close to his family have shared that he suffered from a servere heart condition for years.

=== International feedback ===
- European Union: The European Union issued a statement saying, "Shocked and saddened by the death of activist and former legislative candidate Nizar Banat, following his arrest by Palestinian security forces last night. Our condolences to his family and loved ones. A full, independent and transparent investigation must be conducted immediately."
- United States: State Department spokesman Ned Price said the United States was "deeply disturbed by the death of Palestinian activist Nizar Banat and the information reported regarding the circumstances of his death." "We have serious concerns about the restrictions imposed by the Palestinian Authority on Palestinians' exercise of freedom of expression and the harassment of activists and civil society organizations", Price added.

== See also ==
- Bassel al-Araj
- Shireen Abu Akleh
- Abdulrahman Thaher
