= Birzeit University closures =

Closing of Palestinian university

Birzeit University is a public university in the West Bank, Palestine. As a frequent centre of Palestinian nationalism, there has been clashes between its students and Israel Defense Forces. It has been forcibly closed by the Israeli military fifteen times between 1973 and 1992.

== Background ==
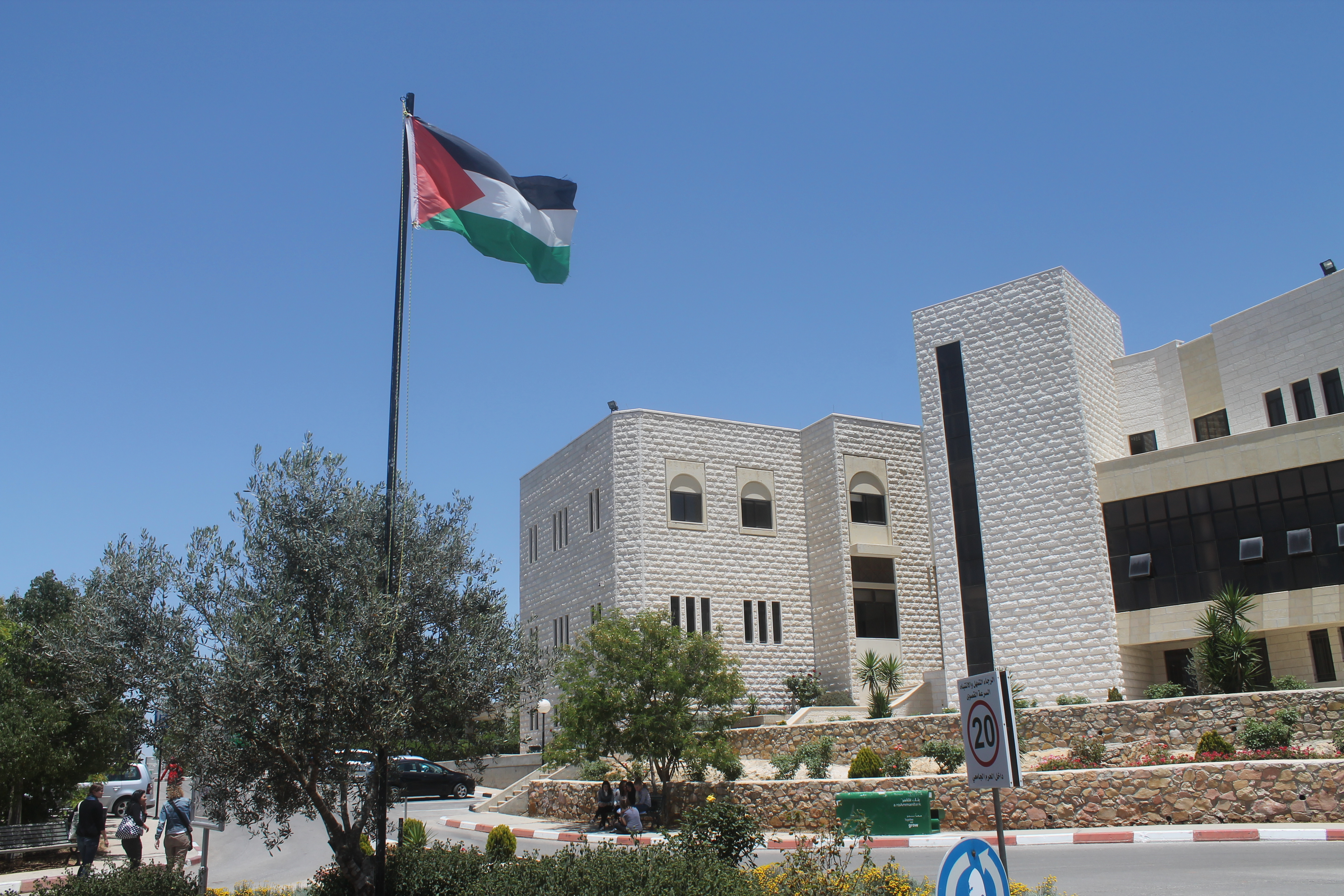
Birzeit University in 2013

Birzeit University was founded by Nabiha Nasir in 1924 as a school for girls and later developed into a junior college. After Israel captured the West Bank during the Six-Day War in 1967, restrictions on travel to universities elsewhere in the Arab world contributed to Birzeit's expansion into an institution offering four years of university education; it adopted the name Birzeit University in 1975. The university became a frequent centre of Palestinian political activity and disputes with the Israeli military authorities.

== History ==
=== December 1973 ===
In early December 1973, eight Palestinian nationalists, including the mayor of Al-Bireh and a member of the Jerusalem Supreme Muslim Council, were arrested by Israeli forces and exiled to Jordan on grounds of incitment and advocating cooperation with terrorist organisations. The deportations provoked several protests across the Palestinian Territories, including some at Birzeit University. In response, the Israeli Military Governorate ordered the university closed down. Following a media campaign by the university administration, the Military Governorate allowed the university to re-open after two weeks.

According to Gabi Baramaki, then vice-president of the university, the university "had been the site of non-violent protests for several years" by 1973, with the university administration allowing students to hold protests despite repeated demands by the Israeli Military Governorate that the administration intervene and block student activism, claiming that the university needed to protect its students' freedom of speech and academic freedom. Baramaki wrote in 2009 that:

"Unfortuantely, one day in December 1973, just before the university's Christmas break, the outcome of the student protests was more serious for the university. There had been yet another student demonstration, consisting of the usual 'march around Jericho' on campus territory. The army had rushed in and broken it up by beating any student they could get a hold of, as they had done many times before. Still, the problem seemed to be over. A couple of days later, though, [university president] Hanna Nasser telephoned me and said 'Gabi, you know what has happened? They have closed the college.' It was shocking, something we had never anticipated, the closing of a major educational institution."

=== March 1979 ===
In March 1979, the university was ordered closed for a week following a clash between student protestors and Israeli soldiers which left four students injured.

=== May 1979 ===
On 2 May 1979, Israel held its annual Independence Day celebrations. As part of the celebrations, the far-right and ultranationalist Gush Emunim settler movement held a march through the West Bank. As the march approached Ramallah, Birzeit students held a counter-demonstration. Clashes subsequently broke out between the two demonstrations, resulting in one Birzeit student being shot by an Israeli settler.

As a result of the clashes, the Israeli government ordered Birzeit University closed. The Israeli military also carried out a search of the university campus. During the closure, students were banned from entering the campus grounds, the phone lines of Birzeit city were cut, and the city's main street was also ordered shut. The university attempted to continue classes via distance correspondence, with some exams being held at professors' homes and some at the Grand Hotel in Ramallah.

The university was allowed to re-open on 3 July, after two months of closure.

=== November 1980 ===
In November 1980, the university was closed for eight days to prevent the student council from organising Palestine Week, an annual event at the university celebrating Palestinian culture and identity, including hosting plays and poetry readings. The Israeli government claimed that Palestine Week was a political event, not a cultural one, aimed at provoking anti-Israel sentiments.

The forced closure of the university sparked protests across the West Bank. Eleven protestors were injured after being shot by Israeli forces using live ammunition to disperse the protests, some of which had thrown stones at Israeli military vehicles. The forced closure also sparked some controversy among some Israelis.

=== November 1981 ===
In November 1981, Israeli Minister of Defence Ariel Sharon re-organised the Military Governorate into the Israeli Civil Administration, appointing Menahem Milson as new head of the Israeli occupation of the West Bank. Scepticism that the re-organisation was a prelude to annexation and the timing of the re-organisation coinciding with Balfour Day led to a significant outbreak of protests across Palestine. During the protests, the Israeli military ordered Birzeit University closed. The Israeli military also carried out arrests of Baramki, several of the university's administration staff, and the entirety of the student union council. The forced closure of the university inflamed the protests and was controversial inside Israel, leading to the creation of the Israeli Solidarity Committee for Birzeit University.

The university was allowed to re-open on 4 January 1982, two months later. Even as the university re-opened, several members of the student union council were kept under house arrest by the Israeli military.

=== February 1982 ===
In mid-February 1982, Israeli Civil Administration official Zion Gabai visited the Birzeit University campus to have a meeting with the university administration with the goal of enforcing Israeli Military Order No. 854, which gave the Civil Administration greater control over Palestinian universities. As a response to the meeting and to alleged violations of academic freedom, including several incursions by the Israeli military into the campus to tear down posters and the expulsion from the West Bank of a lecturer in late January, the student council declared a three-day student strike. During Gabai's meeting, a group of students held a protest outside of the administration building against the visit. When Gabai left the building at the end of the meeting, he was attacked by the protesting students, who threw stones at him and burned his yarmulke, until he fired a gun into the air to be able to escape. The university administration claimed that it had asked Gabai to postpone the meeting out of fear of potential protests. The protesting students claimed that Gabai had been wearing clothing similar to that worn by the far-right and ultranationalist Gush Emunim settler movement.

As a result of the attack on Gabai, the Israeli military ordered the university closed for two months. The forced closure provoked a small wave of protests across Palestine. The closure of the university also prevented a scheduled visiting lecture by British physicist Freeman Dyson, a frequent supporter of the university, who subsequently called for academic freedom in Palestine to be respected when giving his acceptance speech for the Wolf Prize in Physics later in March 1982.

The university was allowed to re-open in mid-April 1982.

=== July 1982 ===
In June 1982, Israel invaded Lebanon, aiming to put an end to the Palestinian insurgency in South Lebanon and to install a pro-Israel government in Lebanon, beginning the 1982 Lebanon War. A number of protests against the war took place in Palestine, including some by Birzeit University students, resulting in dozens of the students being arrested after Israeli forces dispersed the protests. Acting university president Gabi Baramaki alleged that the largest of the student protests against the war broke out after the Israeli military raided a student dormitory in nighttime, arresting forty students and forcing them to shout out anti-PLO slogans as they were marched through the streets to detention facilities. In response to the protests, Israeli Minister of Defence Ariel Sharon personally ordered the university to be shut down for three months, the second Palestinian university to be ordered shut due to anti-Lebanon War protests after Bethlehem University.

Several dozen more of the university's students were arrested after gathering in an East Jerusalem high school to try and continue their classes. Jerusalem District Police spokesperson Ziv Rotem stated that the arrests were made "on suspicion that their presence would disrupt public order." The university administration claimed that the closure was part of "an intensification and escalation of disruptive acts against Birzeit," including nighttime raids on dormitories, arrests of student council members, the erection of roadblocks preventing access to campus, confiscation of the ID cards that students needed to be legally allowed to travel from place to place in the West Bank, and intrusions of settlers onto the campus grounds.

Following the university's re-opening later in 1982, a number of Birzeit faculty members holding non-Palestinian passports as well as faculty members from other universities in Palestine, were expelled from the West Bank by the Israeli military after refusing to sign a pledge opposing the PLO.

=== February 1984 ===
On 31 January 1984, around 400 Birzeit students held a demonstration on campus protesting the news of a Jewish Underground plot to blow up the Dome of the Rock as well as the death of a 17-year-old in Nablus, who had been killed by Israeli gunfire when a group of youth threw stones at an Israeli patrol. The Israeli military deployed soldiers to disperse the demonstration, surrounding the university for five hours. The Israeli military subsequently ordered the university's campus to be closed for three months, citing "violent disturbances and grave violations of public order" and stating that it would "not permit students motivated by the P.L.O. and activated by hostile elements to exploit institutions of higher education in Judea, Samaria and the Gaza Strip for incitement and hostile activities."

The university was originally allowed to continue its classes at the university's new campus, then still under construction, but the new campus was also subsequently ordered closed as well.

=== March 1985 ===
In early March 1985, the Israeli military raided the Birzeit University campus, arresting around fifty people and seized a number of books and posters that it deemed "inciting material." The university claimed that the seized material was composed of literature that was the Israeli government had only banned in the West Bank, not in Israel. The Israeli military subsequently ordered the university closed for two months.

A group of 400 French academics, including Laurent Schwartz, Jean-Claude Pecker, and Pierre Vidal-Naquet, signed a petition addressed to the Israeli government calling for it to reverse the closure. American member of Congress John Conyers also spoke out against the closure.

The university was allowed to re-open on 8 May 1985. Following the re-opening, the Israeli Coordinator of Government Activities in the Territories indicated that it would adopt a less strict approach in the future, with "more emphasis on taking specific measures against individuals who are engaged in incitement or other such activities, rather than collective measure against the universities as a whole."

=== December 1986 ===
On 4 December 1986, a group of Birzeit students organised a sit-down protest in front of a recently erected Israeli roadblock on the main road into the university that had significantly hampered campus life and had resulted in students being harassed by the Israeli soldiers manning the roadblock. After the sit-down protest was forcibly dispersed by the Israeli military and a professor from the university arrested, a second, larger student protest formed, which Israel forces again forcibly dispersed, resulting in a number of the students being shot by live ammunition, with two dying and eleven being seriously injured.

The shootings, which the university administration described as "the worst incident of police brutality in university history," resulted in a mass wave of protests breaking out across Palestine, during which the university was ordered shut by the Israeli military.

The university was allowed to re-open in January 1987.

=== February 1987 ===
In late January 1987, Israeli Minister of Defence Yitzhak Rabin held a meeting with the chairs of several Palestinian universities, warning them that although the Israeli government didn't want to infringe on academic freedom, it would take measures against universities that did not act to suppress unrest.

Three weeks later, the Israeli government ordered all of the major universities in the West Bank closed following another wave of protests across Palestine triggered by the Israeli military's use of live ammunition to disperse a rally held in the Balata Camp. Birzeit would be closed for four days, from 18 to 21 February.

=== March 1987 ===
Birzeit University was ordered closed by the Israeli government for four days at the end of March 1987 as a preventative measure against the Palestinian Land Day protests, annually held to mark the anniversary of a significant wave of protests that broke out in 1976 over a move by the Israeli government to confiscate Palestinian land. An-Najah National University and Bethlehem University were also ordered shut as a preventative measure.

=== April 1987 ===
In late March 1987, 3000 Palestinians in Israeli custody launched a hunger strike over prison conditions. The hunger provoked a number of demonstrations across Palestine in support of the prisoners and an increase in violence between Palestinians and Israeli settlers. On 13 April, a demonstration in support of the prisoners was started by Birzeit University students, before moving into the city of Birzeit, merging with protests by secondary school students and other residents of Birzeit. Israel forces then moved to kettle and disperse the protest, using live ammunition. One Birzeit University student, named Musa Hanafi, was killed.

Following the dispersal of the protest, the Israeli government ordered the university closed. The order included a ban on faculty members accessing research labs and the university library.

The university was allowed to re-open on 13 August, four months later. Following the university's re-opening, the Israeli military commander in the West Bank warned that "If the administration is not capable of controlling the students, and they continue to cause serious disturbances, I believe that the defence establishment will perhaps have no alternative but to close down the campus permanently."

=== January 1988 ===
In December 1987, the largest wave of protests, strikes, boycotts, and acts of civil disobedience since the beginning of the Israeli occupation broke out across Palestine, known the First Intifada, after four Palestinians were killed when an Israeli truck driver ran them over. On 10 January 1988, following several protests by Birzeit University students, the Israeli military ordered the university indefinitely closed. By the first week of February, all Palestinians universities would be ordered closed by the Israeli authorities.

The closure provoked protests by the university's students and faculty, demanding that it be re-opened. The university administration claimed that "the order is an act of collective punishment against a Palestinian university by an army which is unable to quash a popular rebellion and a government unable to confront the demands of this rebellion for self-determination."Johnson, Penny (1 June 1988). "Palestinian Universities under Occupation, February-May 1988". Journal of Palestine Studies. 17 (4): 116–122. doi:10.2307/2537295. JSTOR 2537295. The university also announced its intention to move from a semester system to a quarter term system when it could re-open in order to manage with the repeated closures. By August 1988, at least 116 students and 18 faculty members had been arrested since the outbreak of the Intifada, most being held in the Ktzi'ot Prison, and one faculty members and one student had been ordered exiled from Palestine.

As the First Intifada continued, the university's closure was repeatedly extended by the Israeli authorities. Most Palestinian universities were allowed to re-open in 1991. By 1992, Birzeit was the only Palestinian university still ordered closed.

In late April 1992, after over four years, the Israeli government announced that it would allow the university to gradually re-open, beginning with the science and engineering faculties.

== Analysis ==
American journalist Milton Viorst wrote in 1980 that the relationship between the university and the Israeli government worsened significantly after the victory of right-wing party Likud under Menachem Begin in the 1977 Israeli legislative election and the ensuing substantial rise in Israeli settlements in the West Bank, saying that the university's students "felt increasingly besieged, and in the ensuing clashes the Israeli army naturally sided with the settlers. Relationships between the soldiers and the students, never friendly, grew acrimonious." Viorst further wrote that "the position of Israeli authorities on Birzeit is that public order must take precedence over lesser issues such as academic freedom," and that "to a people who have placed an exalted premium on university education, the Israeli military government's action against Birzeit and other Palestinian colleges looks like a threat to the society itself. From the Israeli perspective, suppressing politics at Birzeit is a reasonable means of supporting public order; from the Arab perspective, it is an outrage."

According to Gabi Baramaki, acting president of the university between 1974 and 1993: "external intervention never caused the Israelis to rescind a closure order when the order was for a limited period of time (one week, one or two months, etc). However, when the closures were for an indefinite period, outside pressure tended to be effective."

=== Impact on students ===
According to Baramaki, the university used several different methods to try and continue teaching during the closures, including "holding classes outside the campus; structuring courses so that students may take materials home; developing a system like an open university where teachers are available for questions; and so on. However, the conclusion was finally reached that a quality education cannot be received off campus. Therefore attempts to hold classes during the closures ceased; instead, students and faculty make up the time later."

According to Olga Kapeliuk in 1984, at least 10-15% of Palestinian university students had been arrested at least once for taking part in a demonstration, and "besides the closures by military order, which are a clear case of collective punishment, students are often prevented from entering the universities by army roadblocks and checkpoints. Sometimes only students living nearby are allowed on campus. Because of frequent curfews in the refugee camps, students who live in the camps often miss classes. All this seriously disturbs the normal course of studies and creates an atmosphere of insecurity and nervousness among the faculty and the students. Thus, the teachers at Bethlehem University were asked to work on weekends in order to be ahead of schedule in case the university is closed." Lisa Wolfe of The New York Times wrote in 1987 that "the repeated closings have thrust students into a kind of limbo. Ask students what year of studies they are in, and you get two answers: how long they have been at Bir Zeit and how many years of work they have managed to complete in that time. But the occupation environment at Bir Zeit involves more than closings or restrictions and regulations. It is a poster, tacked to a basketball net, featuring portraits of students killed by Israeli soldiers. It is cafeteria chairs in red, white, green and black, the colors of the Palestinian flag. It is asking a student where he learned to speak Hebrew and getting the matter-of-fact answer - 'in jail.'"

=== Impact on research ===
The closures had significant impacts on the ability of the university's laboratories to carry out their work. During the March 1985 closure, the university's Pharmacy Quality Control Project was unable to carry out its routine monitoring of pharmaceutical products within the West Bank.

== Reactions ==
In 1985, the International Commission of Jurists released a report into Israeli handling of Palestinian universities in which it stated that it did "not agree with those who think that Israel has a consistent aim of preventing the emergence of strong universities" but that there was a "pattern of Israeli treatment of these universities over the last five years has been one of harassment going beyond what might reasonably be justified on grounds of public order or security."

Israeli Minister of Defence Ezer Weizman described the university as a key centre of "hostile political activity on the West Bank," supported by both extremist students and extremist faculty members. In 1979, an aide to Israeli Prime Minister Menachem Begin was quoted by The New York Times as asking "should we permit Birzeit to function and run the risk that it may become an Arab Berkeley? First, Free Speech Movement. Then, campus radicals; at the end, Weathermen?" Israeli politician Chaim Herzog stated that the issue was "whether a body is allowed to hide behind the concept of freedom of speech in order to try to destroy the country in which it exists," saying that the Israeli government could not allow "a form of anarchy to spread, designed to destroy the freedom that everyone in Israel enjoys."

Birzeit professor Hugh R. Harcourt claimed in 1979 that support for Palestinian nationalism among the student population at the university was "fairly general, but emotional rather than organizational." Faculty of Science Dean Ramzi Rihan accused the Israeli government of wanting "be able to push all the buttons and have things happen the way they want." Birzeit professor and public relations officer Albert Aghazarian stated that "Palestinian students are peerless in their determination to study, to earn a degree. There's nothing else they can lay their hands on, except this. And they will cling to their universities despite all. Nothing, but nothing, can stand in their way."

=== Solidarity Committee for Birzeit University ===
In response to the November 1981 closure, a group of Israeli academics and peace activists formed the Solidarity Committee for Birzeit University, to organise in support of the university. Among the Committee's members were computational neuroscientist Daniel Amit and left-wing activist Reuven Kaminer. The Committee would also organise to oppose the 1982 Israeli invasion of Lebanon.

To support the university during the November 1981 closure, the Committee realised a number of actions. On 7 November, a group of 100 Israeli students and professors from the Hebrew University of Jerusalem and Tel Aviv University snuck past the Israeli military cordon surrounding the university to hold a sit-down protest inside the campus calling for its re-opening. On 29 November, 49 Israelis were arrested after sneaking into the West Bank city of Ramallah to take part in a joint Israeli-Palestinian protest organised by the committee. The Israeli military had attempted to prevent the protest from being held by sealing off the city and by preventing non-settler Jews from travelling through the surrounding area. The Israeli military made the arrests after forcibly dispersing the protest using tear gas.

The Committee was also active during the December 1986 closure.

== See also ==
- Academic freedom in the Middle East
