= Alternative Information Center =

Non-governmental organization

The Alternative Information Center (AIC) is a joint Palestinian-Israeli non-governmental organization (NGO) which "engages in dissemination of information, political advocacy, grassroots activism and critical analysis of the Palestinian and Israeli societies as well as the Israeli–Palestinian conflict". It was established in February 1984 by Israeli activists from the Revolutionary Communist League (previously Matzpen-Jerusalem) and Palestinian leftwing activists from the West Bank.

== History ==
Although officially founded in 1984, the AIC had already begun a year before in the form of discussions and as a partnership between Palestinian and Israeli activists. When established, it was one of Israel's very first Non Governmental Organizations and one of the first organizations to define itself as an explicitly joint Palestinian and Israeli organization, a very radical idea at the time (and, perhaps, still today). From its very beginning, the AIC was active in the Israeli and Palestinian peace movements and was very much involved in campaigns such as the (successful) one to stop the torture of the Palestinian prisoner Adnan Anans. In 1985, roughly a year after its founding, the AIC was even involved in secret negotiations between the Israeli government, the organization of Ahmad Jibril (PFLP-GC) and the Red Cross concerning the exchange of captives between Jibril's organization and Israel. The subsequent landmark trial of Warschawski ended with his acquittal on 30 out of the 31 clauses stated in the indictment. However, he was found guilty of the last clause: "Turning a blind eye" on the printing of an "Instruction Manual" – a pamphlet which contained testimonies on GSS interrogations, the torture used during them and advice on how to overcome them. Warschawski was sentenced to eight months in prison with twelve months of a suspended sentence, while the AIC itself was heavily fined.

In January 1999, three principal activists from the AIC, Elias Jeraysi, Inbal Perlson and Yohanan Lorwin, were killed in a flash flood in the Judean desert.

The AIC is active within the Israeli and Palestinian peace camps. It has supported and become involved in campaigns and movements, and the global movement against neoliberal globalization.

== Funding ==
Diakonia, using money from the Swedish government (1.5 million Swedish kronor in 2007–2009); ICCO (more than 500,000NIS in 2008); Christian Aid, with money from the Irish government (329,000 NIS in 2006); NGO PTM – Mundubat (Spain), (1 million NIS in 2006); and Sodepau (support from the Catalan government 200,000 NIS in 2006).

== Publications ==
=== Publication series ===
Arabic, English and Hebrew:

- Economy of the Occupation

=== Periodicals ===
Arabic:

- Rou'ya Ukhra ("Another Vision")

English:

- News From Within

Hebrew:

- Mitsad Sheni ("The Other Front")

=== Various publications ===
Arabic, English and Hebrew:

- Walls and Bridges (2005)

English:

- Palestine and the Other Israel – Alternative Directory of Progressive Groups and Institutions in Israel and the Occupies Territories (1993)
- Globalisation and the Palestinian Struggle (2002)
- Ethnic Cleansing in the Negev (2003)
- Occupation in Hebron (2004)
- From Communal Strife to Global Struggle: Justice for the Palestinian People (2004)
- Cleansing and Apartheid in Jerusalem – An Alternative Guide to Jerusalem (2004)
- Globalisation and International Advocacy by Palestinian and Progressive Israeli Organisations: Initial Survey and Networking (2004)
- The Alternative Information Center: 20 Years of Joint Struggle (2005)
- A Wall on the Green Line? Israel's Wall Project Under Scrutiny (2006)

Hebrew:

- 1985 – The Renewal of the Torture Policy (1986)
- The Deportation – What Really Happened in 1948? A Palestinian Answer to the Zionist Historians and New Historians (1991)
- The Right of Family Reunification – The Abolishment of the Right of Residency of Partners of non-Jewish Israeli Citizens (1992)
- The Crawling Transfer – An Inquiry On the Residency Problems of the Palestinian Residents of East Jerusalem (1994)
- Creative Resistance – The Experience of the Protest Movement in Israel(1994)
- The Arab world, the Palestinians and the Israeli Occupation – A Retrospective Discussion (1994)
- Two Years after Oslo – The Peace Camp in Israel (1994)
- The Settlements 1967-1995 and How To Fight Them (1995)
- We Came To This Land – Discrimination of Palestinian Citizens in the Real Estate Policy in the State of Israel (1997)
- The Golan Heights – The Syrian Highland (1998)
- The Oriental Revolution (1999)
- The Political Activity in the Golan Heights in Relation to the Negotiations Between Syria and Israel (1999)
- The Palestinian Residency in the Mixed Cities – Demography, Education, Employment and Crime (1999)
- The Deportation of the Palestinian Residents of the South Hebron Mountain Area (2001)

=== Publications supported by the AIC ===
Hebrew:

- Letters to a Lemon Tree (1997)
- Encounters of Memory (2000)
- Forbidden Reminiscences – A Collection of Essays (2001)

== See also ==
- Advocate - a 2019 documentary film, which includes some of Michael Warschawski's work with AIC
