= Askar Camp =

Palestinian refugee camp in the Palestinian city of Nablus

- Refugee Camp

Arabic transcription(s)
  - Arabic: مخيم عسكر
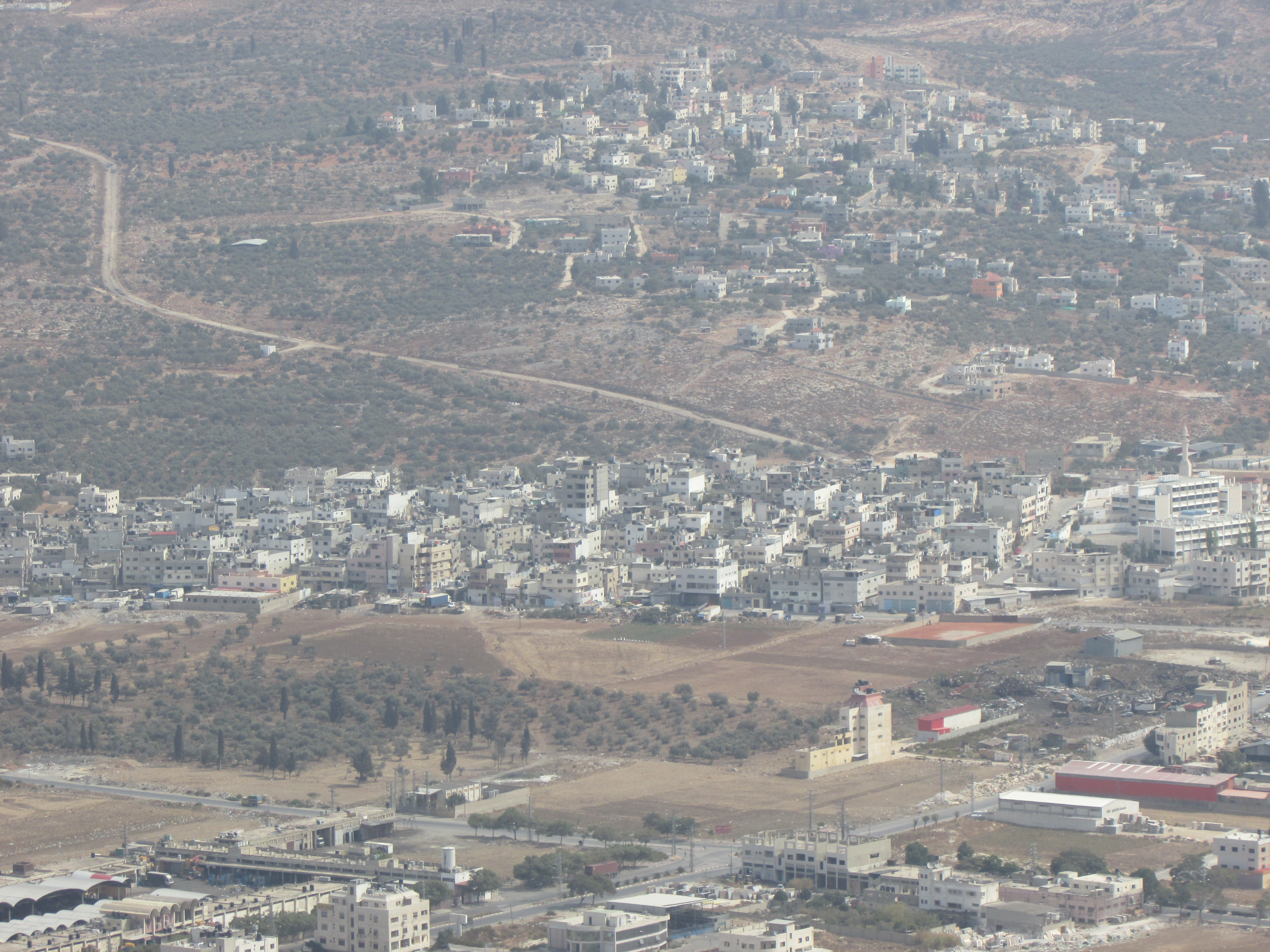
- Askar

- Location of Askar Camp within Palestine
- Coordinates: 32°13′11.51″N 35°17′50.77″E
- Country: Palestine
- Governorate: Nablus

Government
  - Type: Refugee Camp (from 1950)

Area
  - Total: 0.119 km^{2} (0.046 sq mi)

Population (2017)
  - Total: 11,304
  - Density: 95,000/km^{2} (246,000/sq mi)

Askar (Arabic: مخيم عسكر) is a Palestinian refugee camp. It is located on the outskirts of the West Bank city of Nablus and was established in 1950 on 119 dunums of land. Residents of the camp refer to this as “New Askar”.

== History ==
=== Ancient period ===
Askar is identified with Ein Sukkar, an ancient settlement featured in the Mishnah and Talmud, as well as in the New Testament. Thanks to its fertility, the Ein Sukkar Valley is mentioned in Rabbinic literature as a place from which the grain was brought as a wave offering to the Temple when no barley was found in a place closer to Jerusalem. In later years, a Samaritan settlement was established on the site; according to ancient Samaritan writings, the town was inhabited by Samaritan High Priests. A Samaritan mausoleum, still in use during the fourth century CE, was found at the site.

The name Askar preserves the ancient name of Ein Sukkar.

Schenke believed that Askar was first settled during the early Iron Age. However, Campbell dated the settlement to the Hellenistic period.

=== Modern history ===
During the Second Intifada and 2002 Operation Defensive Shield, camps such as Askar were a source of considerable activity from Palestinian militants. IDF incursions are still common in Askar refugee camp and are generally conducted for the purposes of interrogating individuals or arresting suspected militants who Israeli authorities consider to be affiliated with listed terrorist organisations.

The UNRWA has several installations in Askar refugee camp including schools and health clinics. In addition to these, the camp has several of its own community centers including the Center of Peace and Development located in New Askar. International volunteer work camps are run at the center annually which are hosted by the An-Najah National University.

According to the PCBC, the population of the camp is 11,304.
