= Balata Camp =

Palestinian refugee camp in the West Bank

- Refugee Camp

Arabic transcription(s)
  - Arabic: مخيم بلاطة
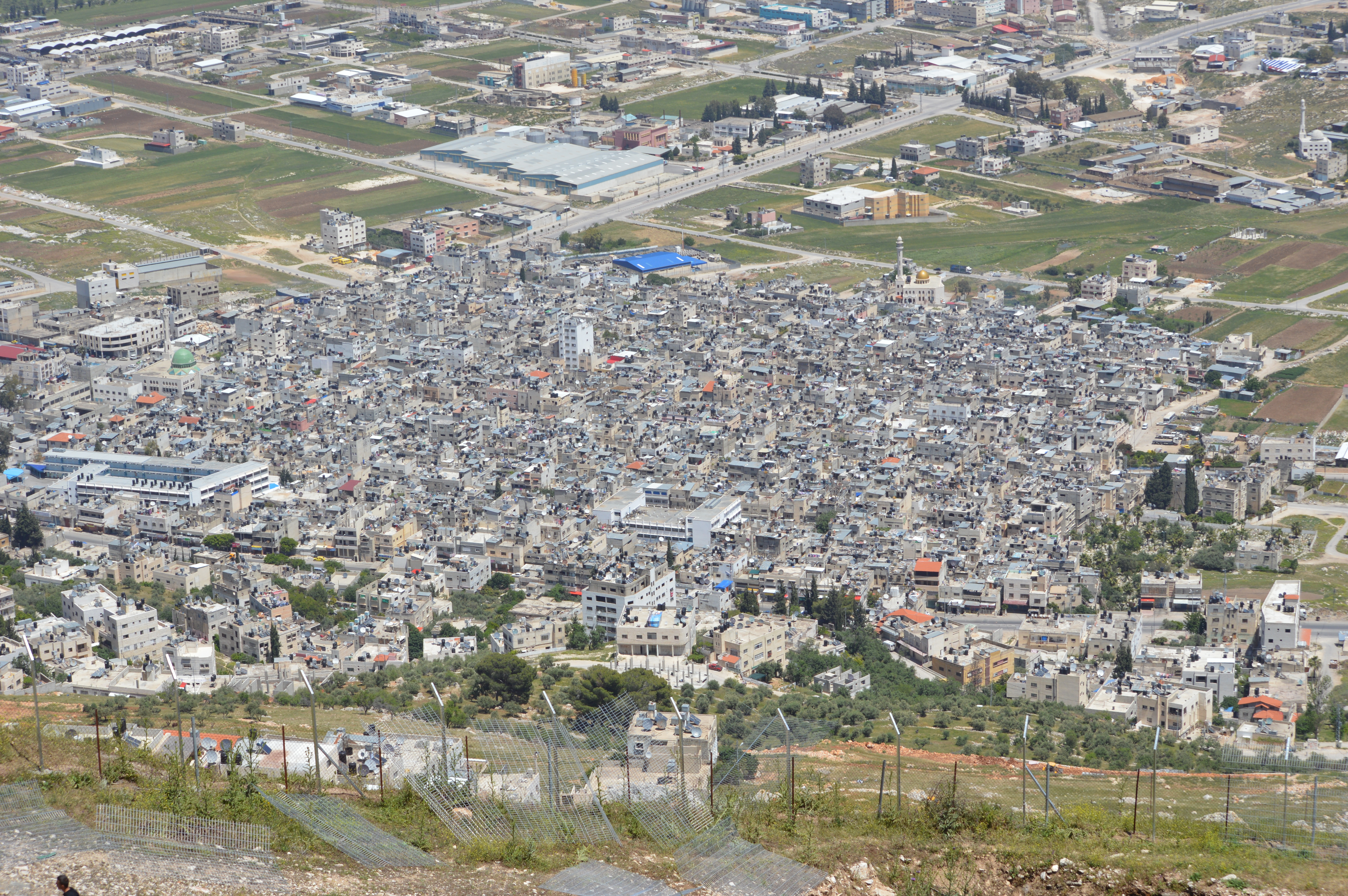
- Balata as seen from Mount Gerizim

- Location of Balata Camp within Palestine
- Coordinates: 32°12′23.06″N 35°17′11.70″E
- State: State of Palestine
- Governorate: Nablus
- Founded: 1950; 76 years ago

Government
  - Type: Refugee Camp (from 1950)

Population (2017)
  - Total: 14,635

Balata Camp (Arabic: مخيم بلاطة) is a Palestinian refugee camp established in the northern West Bank in 1950, adjacent to Balata village on the outskirts of the city of Nablus. Balata Camp had a population of 14,635 in 2017.

== History ==
In 1950, the United Nations (UN) gave refugees from the Jaffa area temporary housing. These people initially refused the UN's offers, stating their eagerness to return to their homes. After two years, they accepted the offer and settled at Balata. In 1956, the Jaffa refugees desired more permanent housing. After the border with Israel was sealed, the refugees moved into concrete housing that replaced the original tents.

== Education and culture ==
The United Nations Relief and Works Agency for Palestine Refugees in the Near East (UNRWA) funds a school in the Balata camp, with approximately 5,000 pupils. The Yaffa Cultural Center in Balata operates a guesthouse, children's theater and cinema, children's library and media center. The American NGO, Tomorrow's Youth Organization, also operates classes for children from Balata.

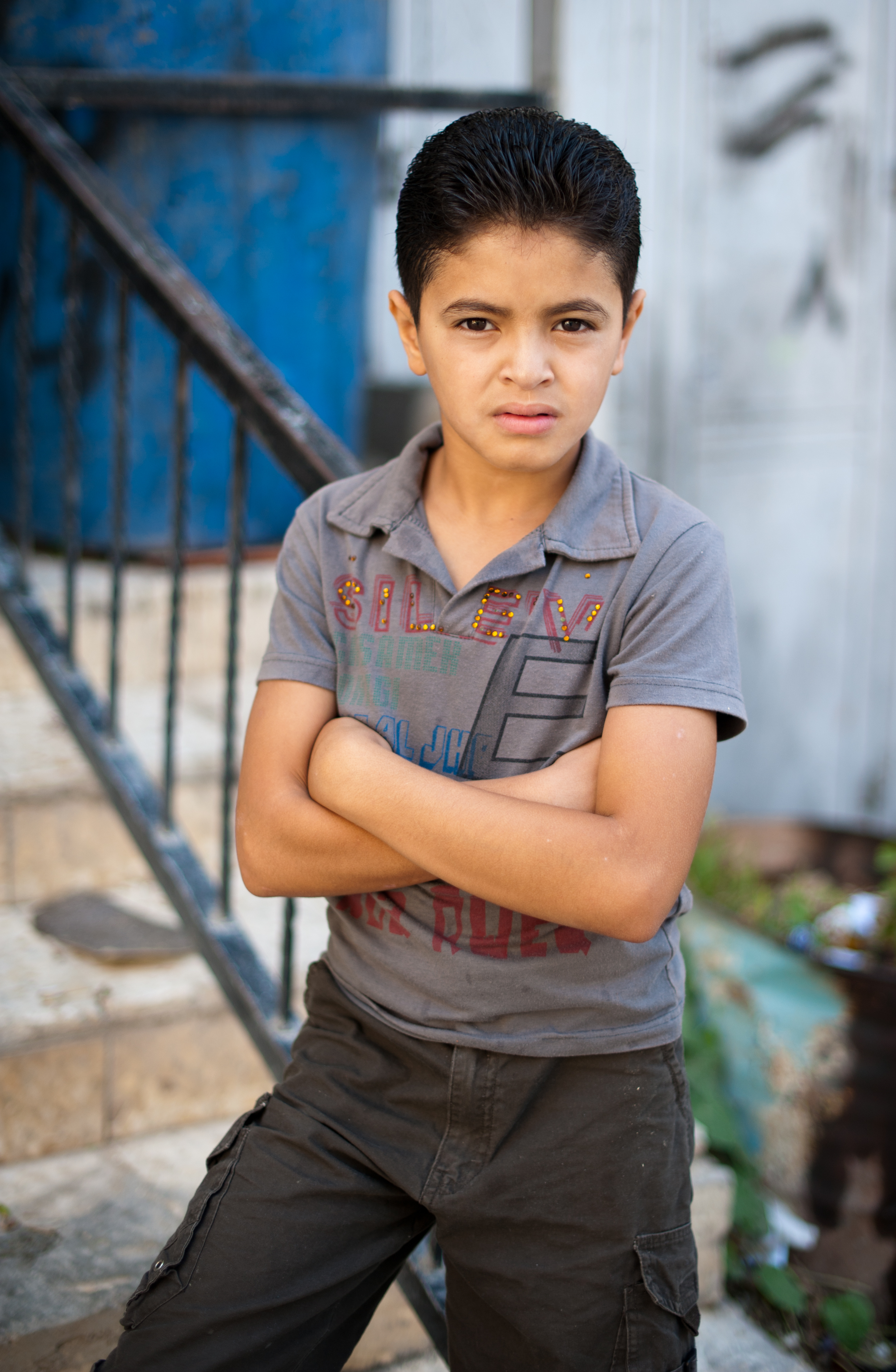
A boy in Balata Camp, August 2011

== Political violence ==
In the 1980s and 1990s, Balata residents played a leading role in the uprising known as the First Intifada. In November 2007, Palestinian National Authority police officers climbed rooftops in Balata and engaged in gun battles with militants of the Al-Aqsa Martyrs' Brigades who had turned the camp into a military stronghold. Five residents and a policeman were wounded in the shooting.

== Notable people ==
- Sakher Habash

== Gallery ==
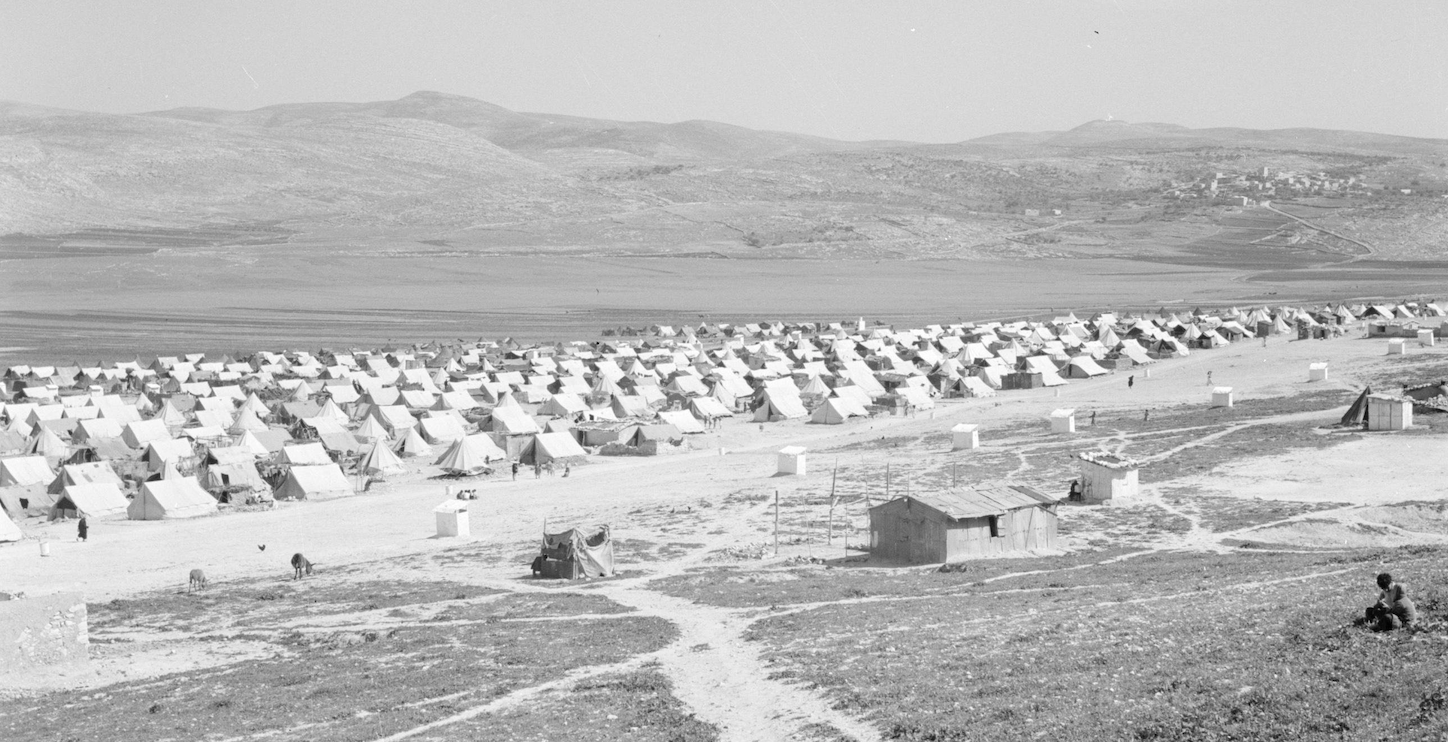
Balata, 1950; the refugees were still living in tents

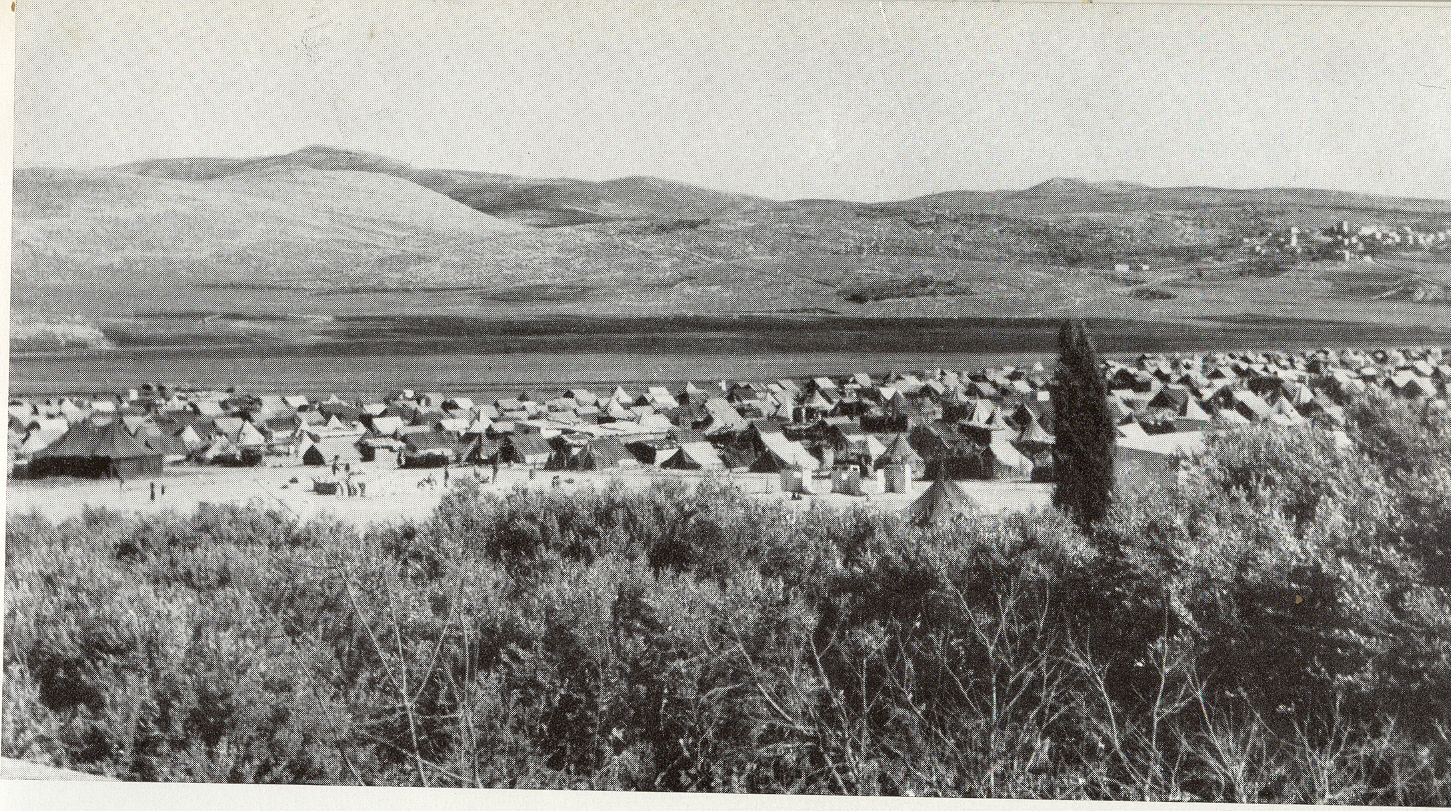
Balata Camp, early 1950s

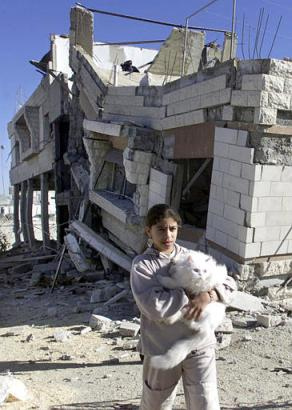
Demolished home in Balata, 2002, during the Al-Aqsa Intifada

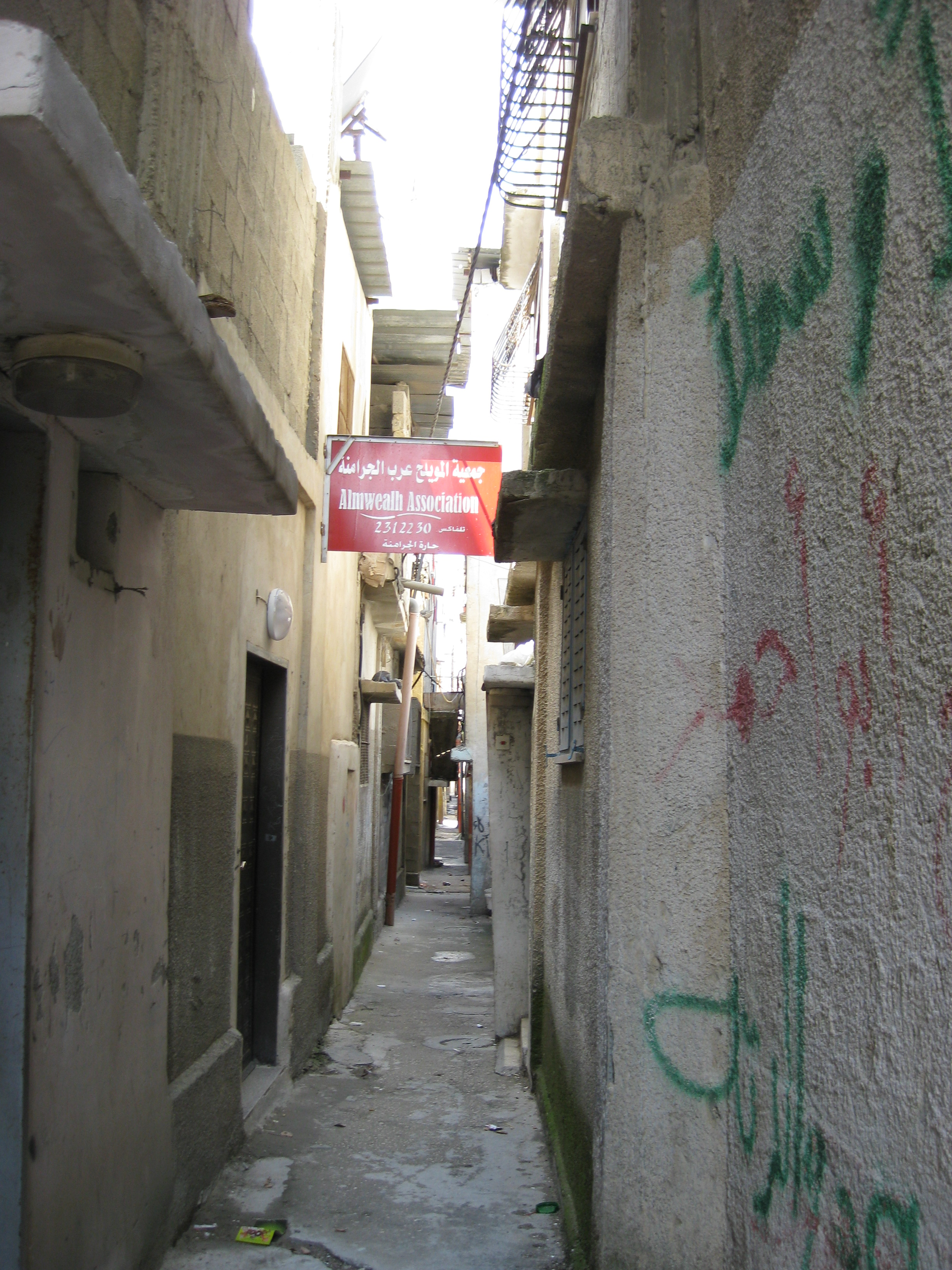
Balata Refugee Camp, 2011

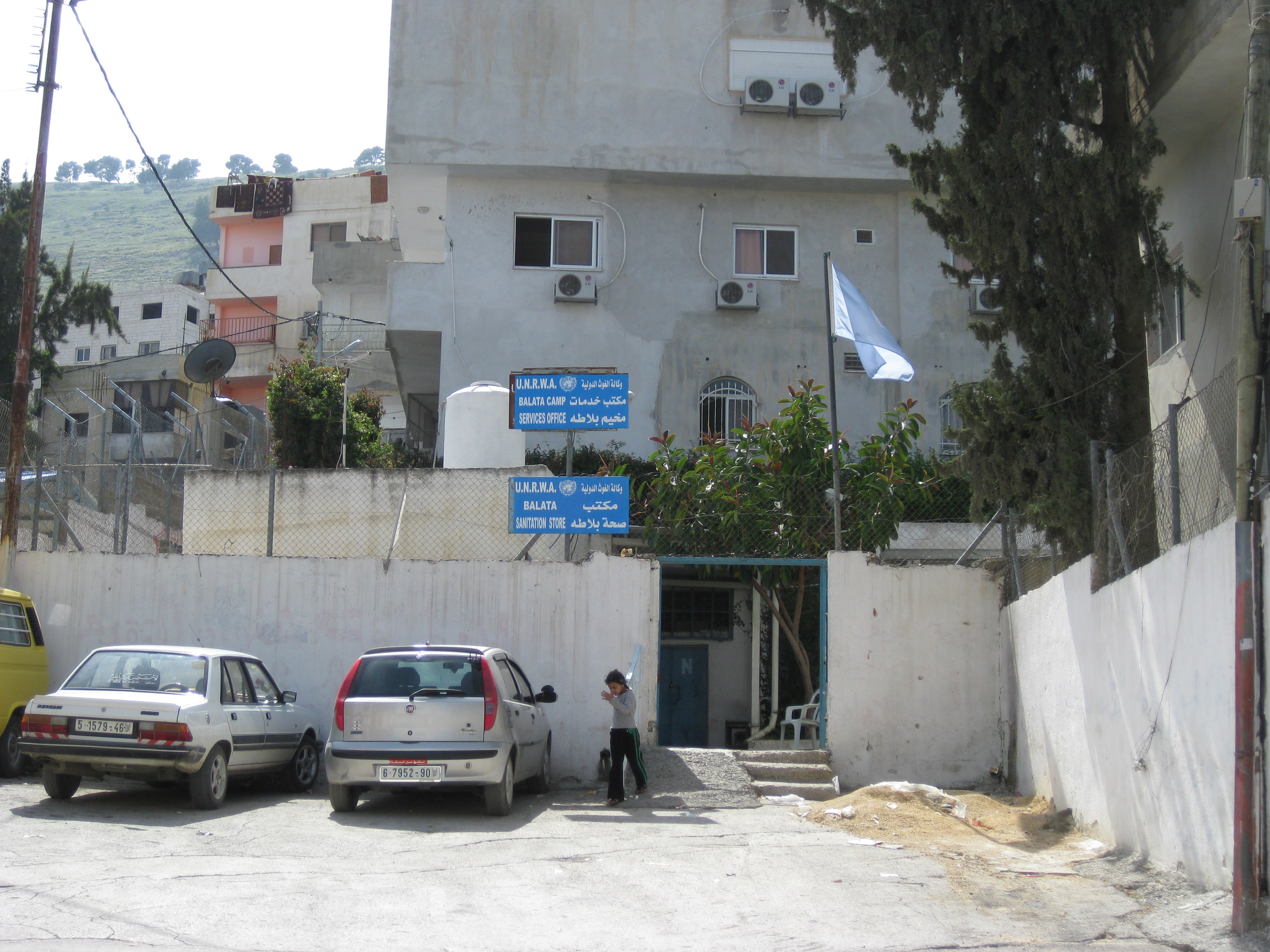
UNRWA Office in Balata Camp, 2011
