= List of universities and colleges in Palestine =

This is a list of universities and colleges in the State of Palestine, which comprises both the West Bank and the Gaza Strip. The West Bank and Gaza together had 14 universities, an open university for distance learning, 18 university colleges and 20 community colleges.

All universities in Gaza have been destroyed by the Israel Defense Forces. See "Attacks on schools during the Israeli invasion of Gaza" for more.

== West Bank ==
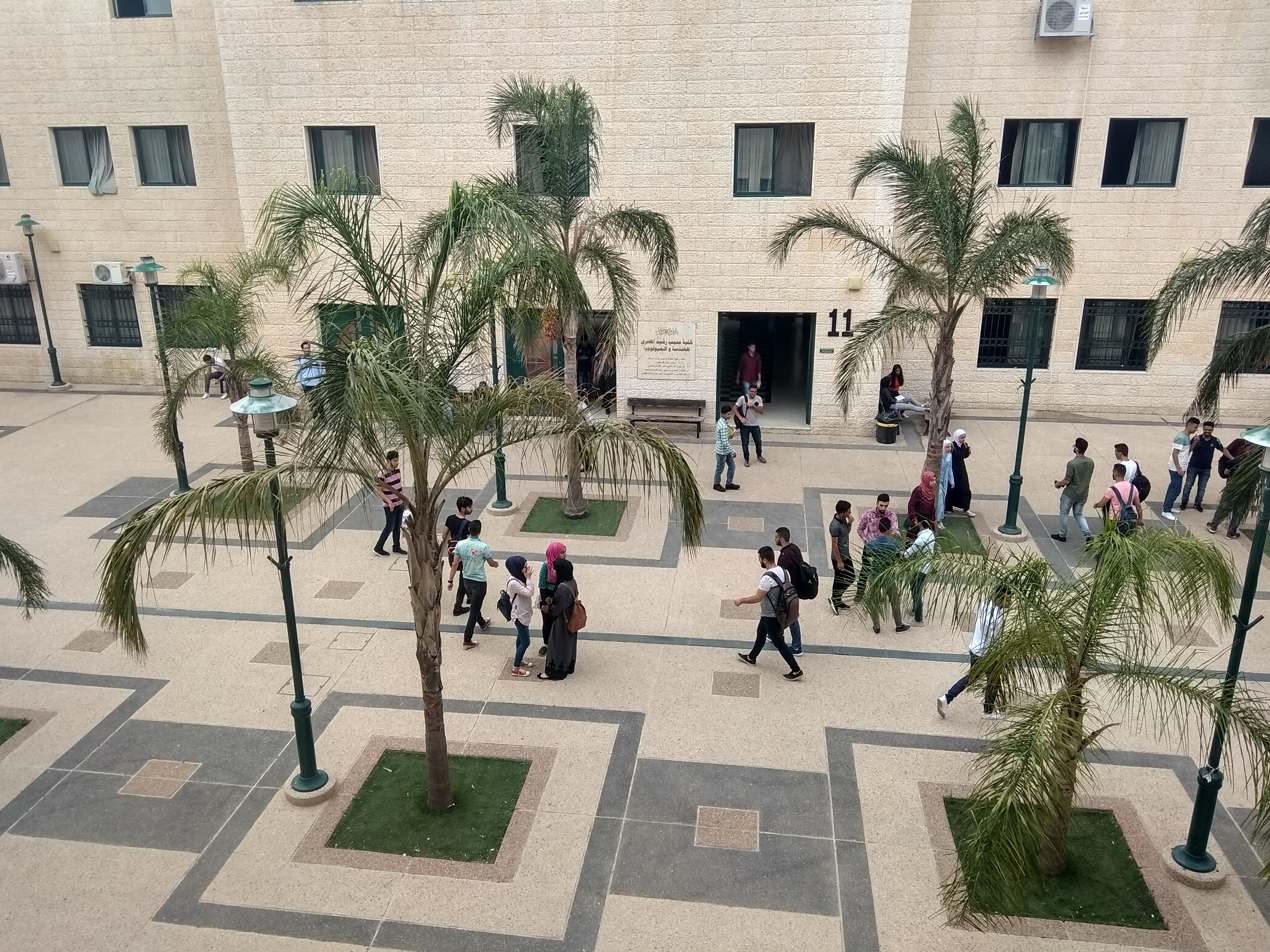
An-Najah National University, Nablus

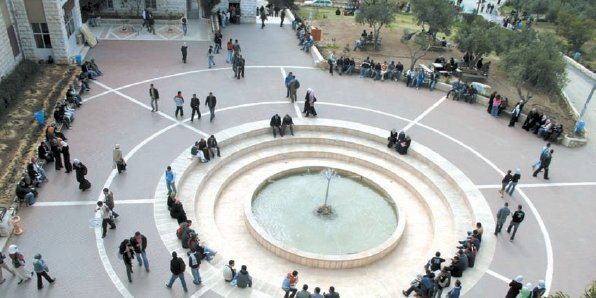
Al-Quds University, Jerusalem

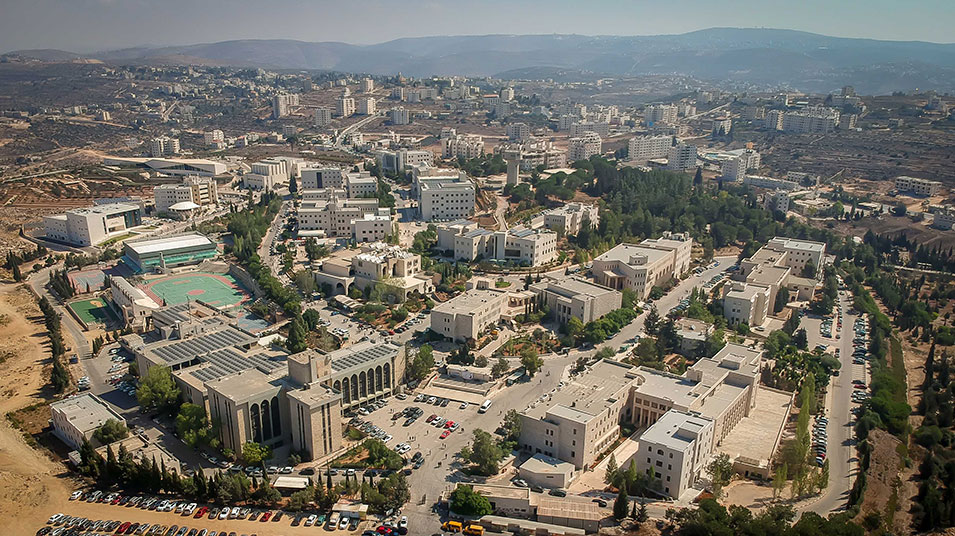
Birzeit University, Birzeit, which is near Ramallah

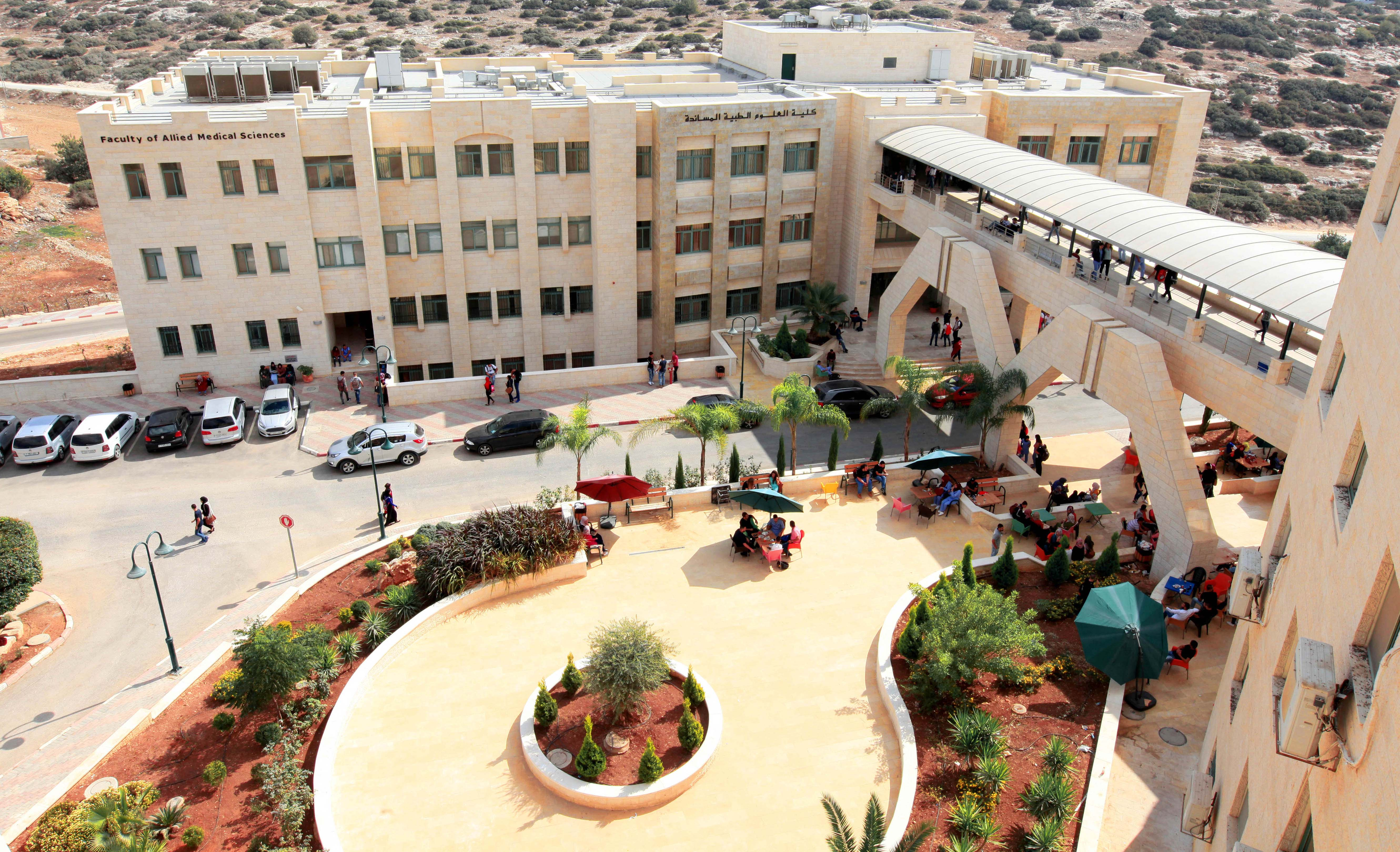
Arab American University, Jenin

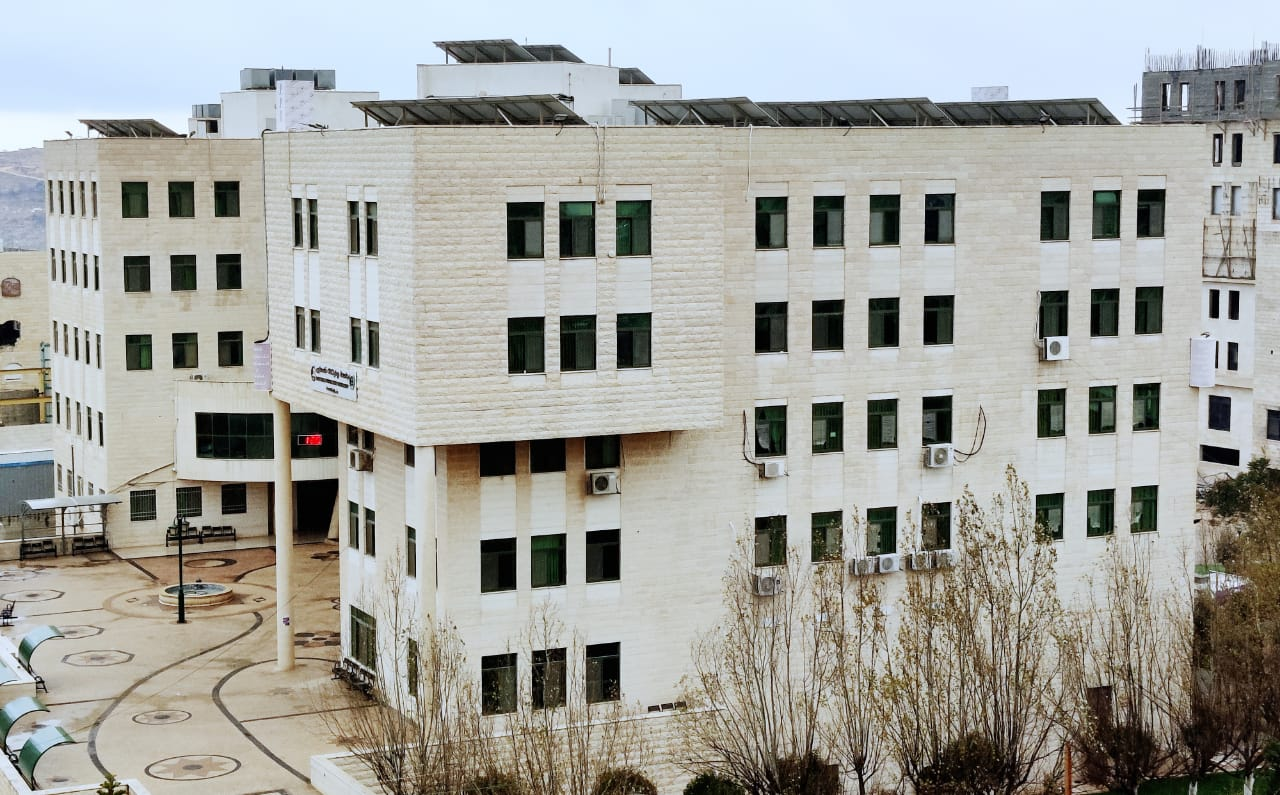
Palestine Polytechnic University, Hebron

- Al-Quds University
- Al-Quds Open University
- An-Najah National University
- Arab American University
- Bethlehem Bible College
- Bethlehem University
- Birzeit University
- Dar Al-Kalima University
- Edward Said National Conservatory of Music
- Hebron University
- Ibrahimieh College
- Palestine Technical University – Kadoorie
- Palestine Ahliya University
- Palestine Polytechnic University
- International Academy of Art, Palestine
- Al-Istiqlal University

== Gaza Strip ==
Due to the Israeli invasion, all universities in Gaza have been destroyed.

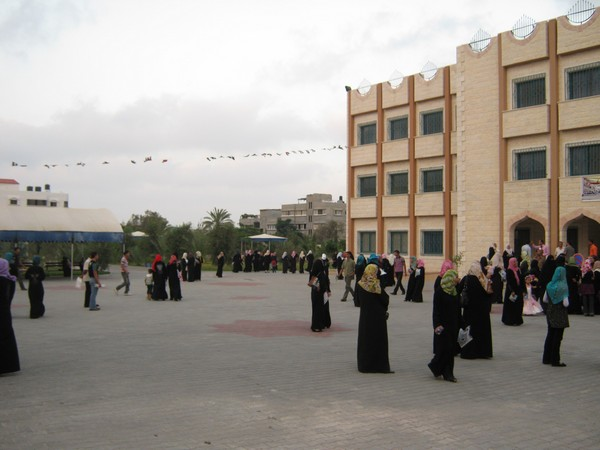
Islamic University of Gaza, Gaza City

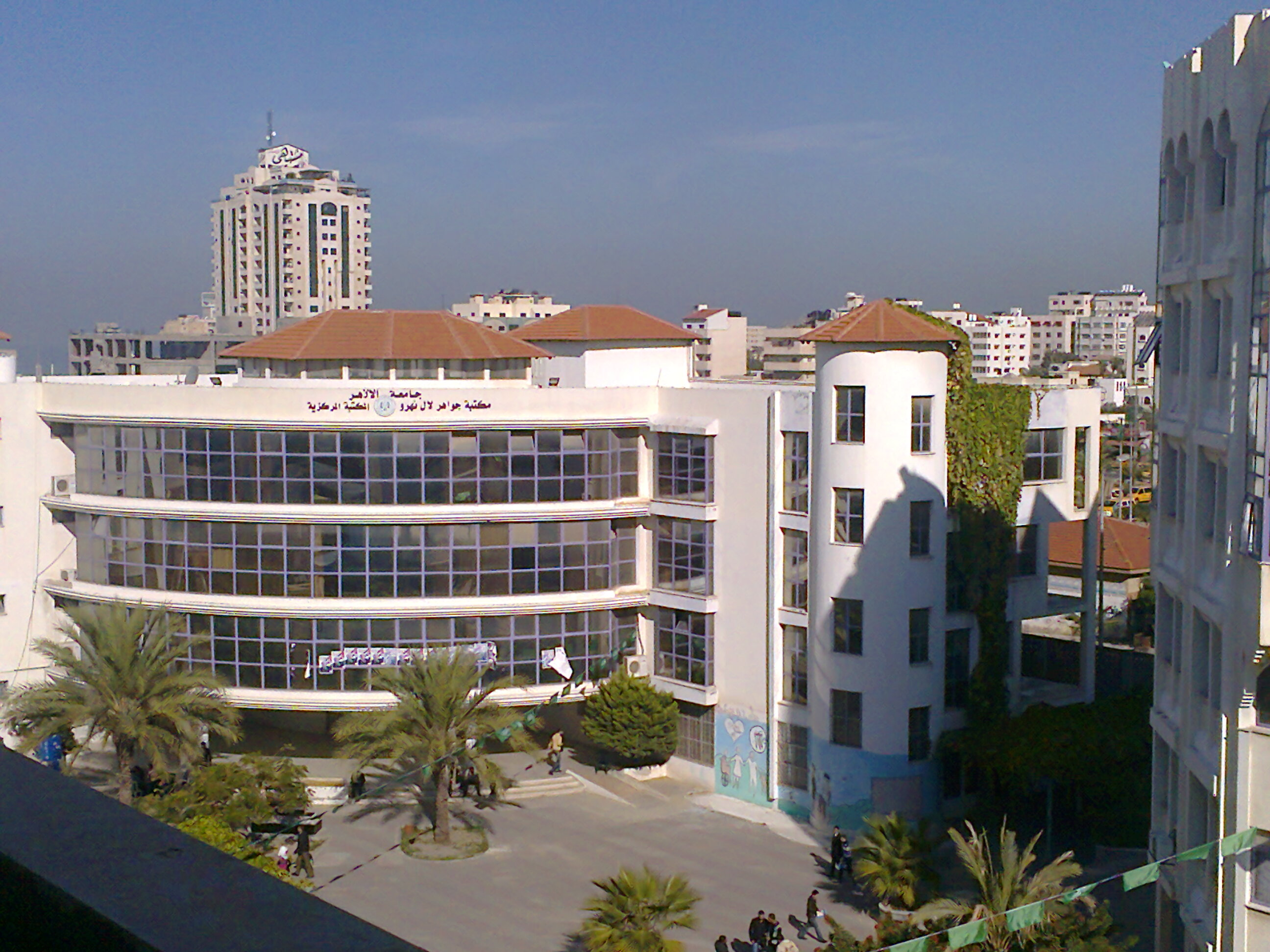
Nehru Library in Al-Azhar University – Gaza, Gaza City, named after Indian prime minister Jawaharlal Nehru

- Al-Aqsa University
- Al-Azhar University – Gaza
- Al-Quds Open University
- Gaza University (Gaza)
- Islamic University of Gaza
- Israa University
- Palestine Technical College
- University College of Applied Sciences
- University of Palestine
- Gaza Community/Training Center
- Palestine College of Nursing
- Hassan University

== Other education and research institutions ==
- Applied Research Institute–Jerusalem
- Health, Development, Information and Policy Institute
- Palestinian Academic Network
- Palestinian Academic Society for the Study of International Affairs
- Palestinian Ministry of Education and Higher Education

== Education and research organizations outside Palestine ==
- Durham Palestine Educational Trust
- Institute for Middle East Understanding
- Institute for Palestine Studies
- PEACE Programme - under the auspices of UNESCO
