= Said Al Zebda =

Palestinian academic (died 2023)

Said Anwar Al Zebda سعيد الزبدة
- Born: 1980; Zeitoun neighborhood, Gaza City, Gaza Strip, Palestine
- Died: December 31, 2023 (aged 43); Zeitoun neighborhood, Gaza City, Gaza Strip, Palestine
- Cause of death: Killed by the Israeli Air Force
- Other name: Saeed Al-Zebda
- Education: University of Nottingham
- Occupations: Electrical engineer, academic and president at University College of Applied Sciences

Said A. Alzebda (died 2023) was a Palestinian electrical engineer and academic. He was president of the University College of Applied Sciences until his death in Israeli airstrikes on 31 December 2023.

== Early life and education ==
Born in the Zeitoun neighborhood in Gaza City, Gaza Strip, Palestine, Said Anwar Al Zebda studied telecommunications engineering, then obtained his master's and doctorate degrees in electronic communications and computer engineering from the University of Nottingham, United Kingdom.

== Career ==
Professor Al Zebda was first appointed as Head of the Developmental Programs at UCAS, then Head of the Yukas Technology Incubator. Professor Al Zebda was then promoted to Assistant to the College President for Developmental Affairs, before the college's Board of Trustees announced his appointment as the new President of the University College of Applied Sciences, succeeding Professor Rifat Naim Rustam.

== Death ==
On December 31, 2023, Israeli forces launched an aerial attack on the Zeitoun neighborhood in Gaza City, bombing a number of buildings and homes, including the home of Said Al Zebda, who was killed along with his wife and children as a result of the Israeli aerial bombardment.

Said Al Zebda was not the only Palestinian academic killed by Israeli forces during the Israeli invasion of the Gaza Strip following October 7 attacks. Sufian Tayeh, president of the Islamic University of Gaza, was killed along with his family in bombing by the Israeli army in the Faluja area in the northern Gaza Strip town of Jabaliya.
