= Bethlehem University =

Catholic university in the West Bank

Coordinates: 31°42′53.50″N 35°11′55.0″E

- جامعة بيت لحم
- Motto: Indivisa Manent; Enter to Learn, Leave to Serve
- Type: Private
- Established: 1 October 1973
- Religious affiliation: Roman Catholic; De La Salle Brothers
- Academic affiliations: ACCU; UNIMED; International Association of La Salle Universities (IALU)
- Chancellor: Most Rev. Monsignor Adolfo Tito Yllana
- Vice-Chancellor: Brother Héctor Hernán Santos González FSC, PhD
- Administrative staff: c. 409
- Undergraduates: 5,000 (fall 2023)
- Location: Bethlehem, West Bank, Palestine
- Website: www.bethlehem.edu

Bethlehem University (Arabic: جامعة بيت لحم, romanized: Jāmiʻat Bayt Laḥm) is a Catholic university located in the city of Bethlehem, in the West Bank, Palestine.

== History ==
Established shortly before the outbreak of the Yom Kippur War in 1973, the university traces its roots to 1893, when the De La Salle Brothers opened schools in Bethlehem, Jerusalem, Jaffa, and Nazareth, along with others in Turkey, Lebanon, Jordan, and Egypt;and to 1964's Pope Paul VI's visit to the Holy Land in which he promised the Palestinian people a university, a centre for Ecumenical Studies (Tantur Ecumenical Institute), and a school for children with special educational needs (Effetá Paul VI School).

As of 2025, Bethlehem University is the first established university in Palestine and the only Catholic university in the Holy Land (excluding seminary schools and theological or biblical institutes). It continues to be a joint project supported by the Vatican and run by the De La Salle Brothers.

In 2017 the Palestine Museum of Natural History opened on the campus; it is closely linked to the Palestine Institute for Biodiversity and Sustainability.

== Demographics ==
Bethlehem University students are predominantly Muslim (~75%) and female (~78%), with Christians representing ~25% of the students.

== Faculties ==
- Arts & Humanities
- Business Administration
- Education
- Nursing & Health Sciences
- Applied Sciences, Technology & Engineering
- Institute of Hotel Management & Tourism

== Majors and Minors ==
1. Archaeology and Cultural Heritage
2. Religious Studies
3. Psychology of Childhood and Adolescence
4. Social Work
5. Sociology
6. English Language, Literature, and Communications
7. Interactive Media and Communication
8. Business Administration
9. Accounting
10. Pre-School Education
11. Lower Basic Level Education
12. Upper Basic Level – Teaching Arabic Language
13. Upper Basic Level – Teaching English Language
14. Upper Basic Level – Teaching Mathematics
15. Upper Basic Level – Teaching Social Studies
16. Nursing
17. Midwifery
18. Speech Therapy and Audiology
19. Physiotherapy
20. Occupational Therapy
21. Medical Laboratory Sciences
22. Pharmaceutical and Industrial Chemistry
23. Software Engineering
24. Computer Simulation in Sciences and Engineering
25. Sustainable Energy Engineering
26. Hotel Management
27. Tourism Studies
28. Computer Information Systems
29. Biology
30. Industrial Chemistry
31. Mathematics
32. Physics

== Interreligious character ==
All religious groups are welcome at the university, which currently counts among its students Christians of many different denominations including Greek Orthodox, Roman Catholic, Lutheran, Anglican, Russian Orthodox, Syriac Orthodox, Greek Catholic, and others.

== See also ==
- Education in Palestine
- List of universities and colleges in Palestine
- Lasallian educational institutions
- Palestine Ahliya University

== Gallery ==
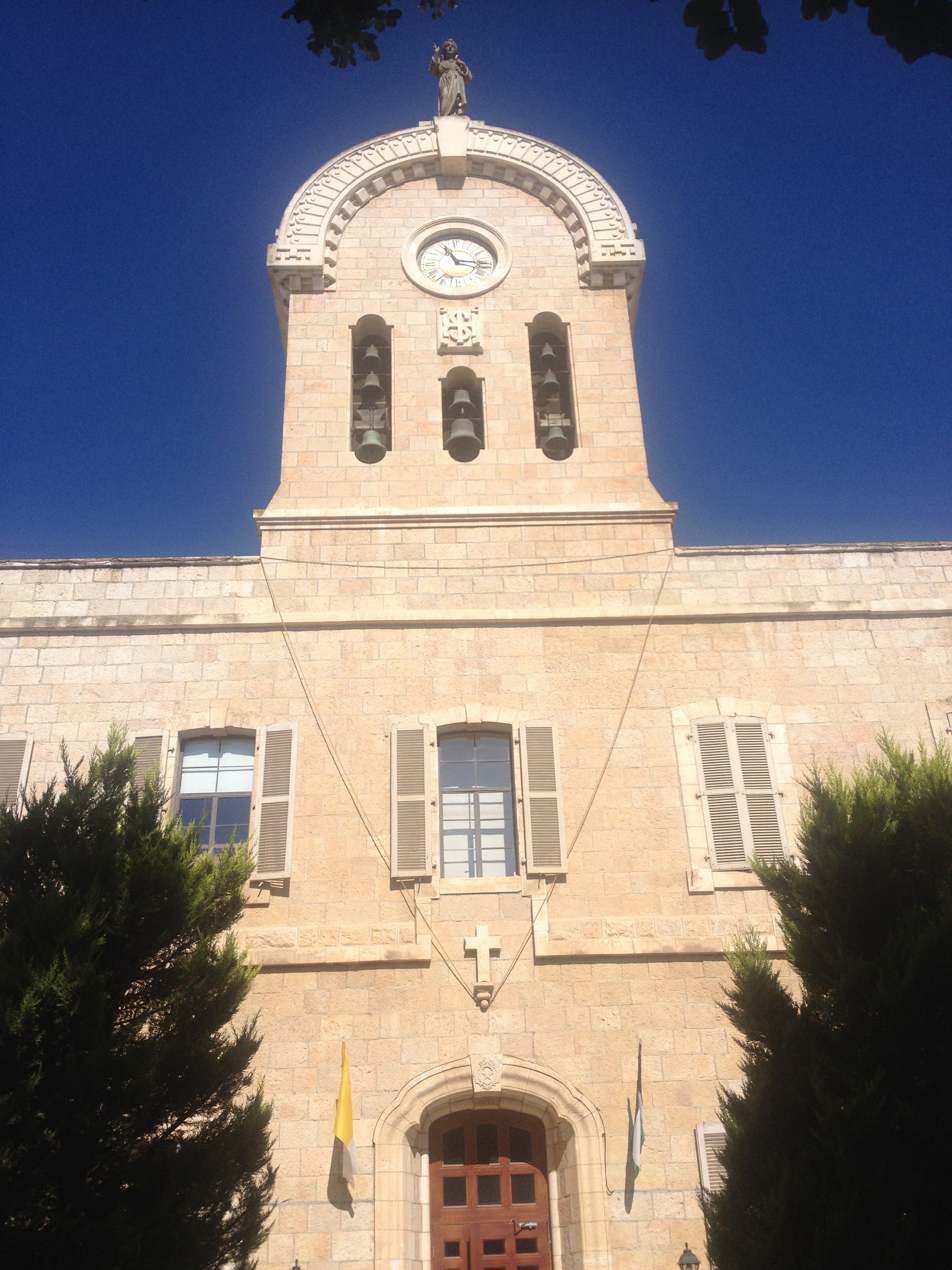
The main building of the university.

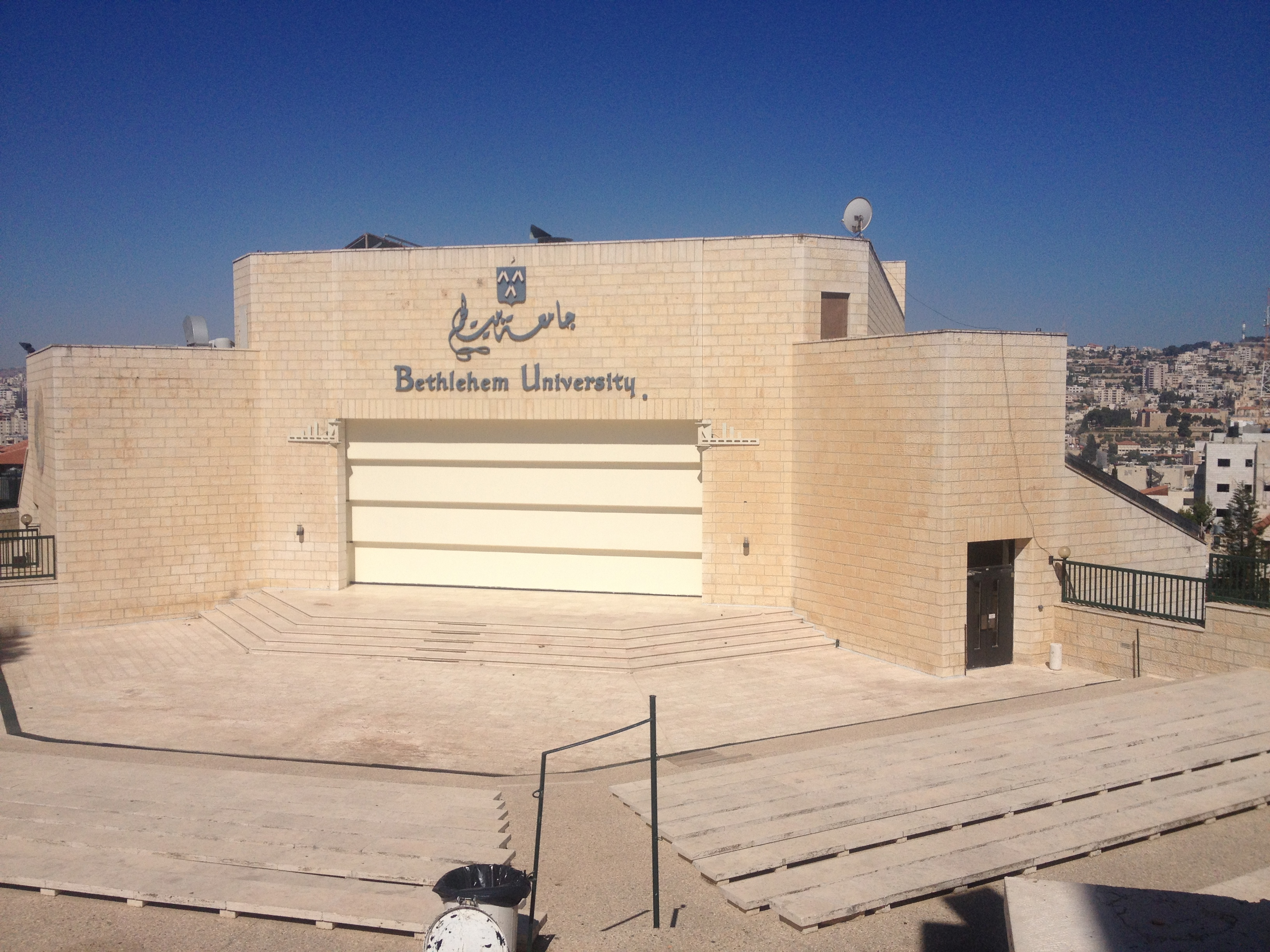
A stage in the university campus.

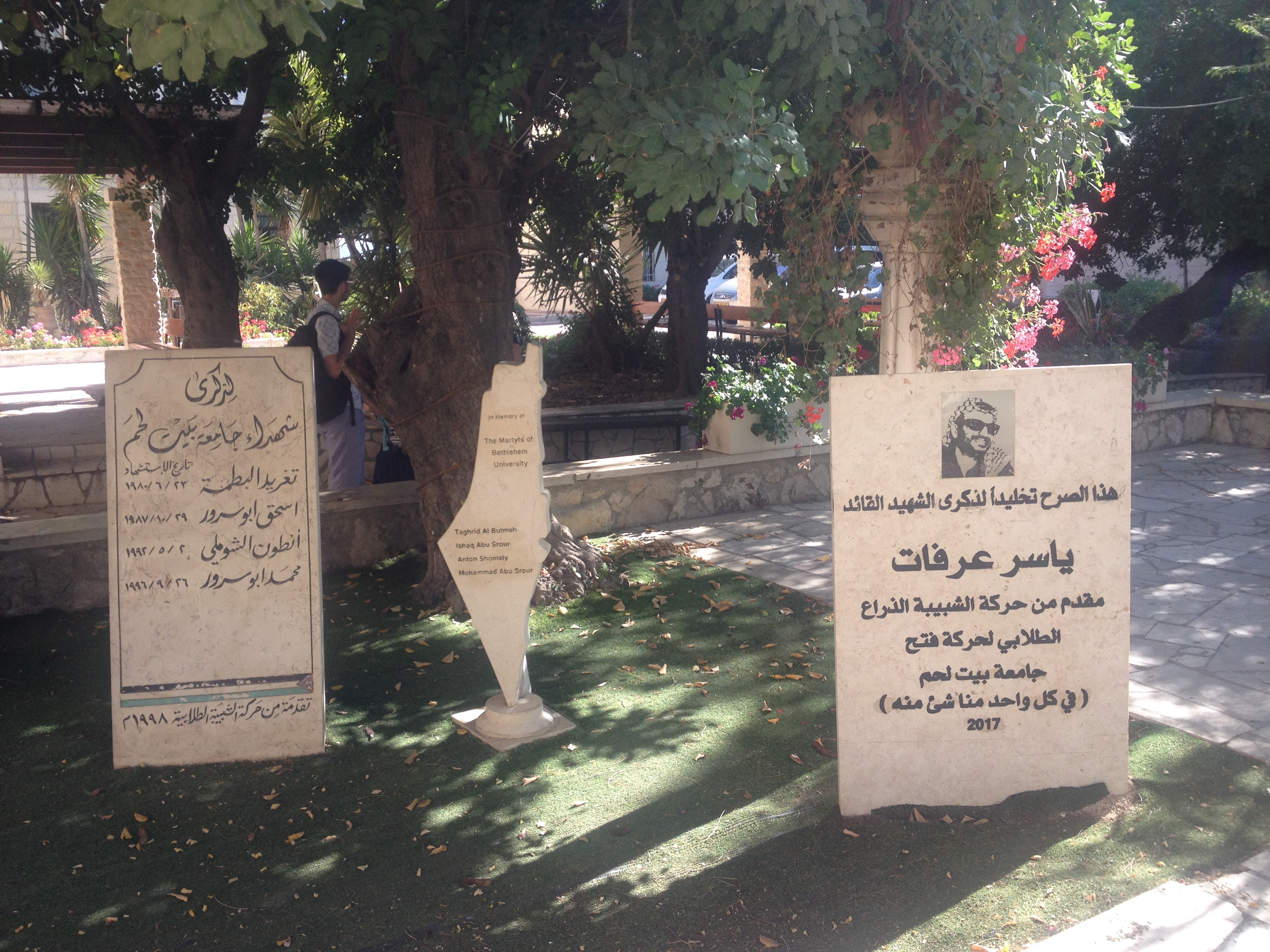
Memorials on campus.
