= Al-Aqsa University =

Palestinian university in the Gaza Strip (est. 1955)

Coordinates: 31°29′0.96″N 34°26′43.96″E

- جامعة الأقصى - غـزة
- Type: Public
- Established: 1955
- President: Dr. Kamal Shrafi
- Undergraduates: 25,325
- Location: Gaza City, Palestine
- Website: www.alaqsa.edu.ps

Al-Aqsa University (Arabic: جامعة الأقصى) is a public university with campuses in Gaza City and Khan Younis, Palestine. Established in 1955 as a teachers' institute before later expanding its curriculum, it is the first and oldest public higher education institution in the Gaza Strip. It caters for some 26,000 students and has some 1,400 employees, 300 of whom are lecturers and professors.

In 2024, the university's facilities were destroyed by Israeli bombardment during the Gaza war.

== History ==
In 1955, when Gaza was under Egyptian administration, a teachers' institute was founded to train teachers at all levels.

It became the State College of Education in 1991 and was renamed Al-Aqsa University in 2001 after it was officially accredited.

In 2003, it joined the Union of Arab Universities and the Palestinian Higher Education Council.

On 16 March 2004, the IDF destroyed a branch campus according to miftah.org. The campus had been disused since 18 January 2001 due to earlier attacks.

During the 2008–09 winter invasion, the university's Tel al-Hawa library was damaged, and a community education facility under construction was destroyed.

A new building containing 32 laboratory spaces was completed in 2022 by the company MECC. Also opened was an early childhood laboratory from the Care (Erasmus+) Project.

In January 2024, a university academic, Dr Wiesam Essa, was killed when his apartment was shelled.

On 17 January 2024, the last university in Gaza was destroyed, Al Jazeera and Euro Med Watch reported.

On 6 February 2024, it was reported by Anadolu Agency that the IDF had shelled two university buildings and opened fire on displaced civilians who had taken shelter on campus.

In May 2024, the IDF Military Police opened an investigation into photograph of an IDF soldier sitting reading in front of burning books at the Central Library of the Islamic University of Gaza, which was widely described as the Al-Aqsa University's library.

== Faculties ==
- Faculty of Applied Sciences
- Faculty of Art and Human sciences
- Faculty of Education
- Faculty of Fine Arts
- Faculty of Media
- Faculty of Management and Financing
- Faculty of Sports
- Faculty of Information Technology

Al-Aqsa University is the only university in the Gaza Strip that offers programmes in the field of media, fine arts, physical education and sports. The faculties offer bachelor's degrees with postgraduate studies on a joint program, established in 1994, between Al-Aqsa University and Ain Shams University, Egypt. The program is on hold now, but there are master's degree programs in a number of faculties in the university.

== See also ==
- List of universities and colleges in Palestine
- Education in Palestine
