= Palestine Polytechnic University =

University in Hebron, West Bank, Palestine

- جامعة بوليتكنك فلسطين
- Established: 1978
- Affiliations: Association of Arab Universities
- President: Amjad Barham
- Vice-president: Ayman Soltan; Raed Amro; Zuhdi Salhab; Islam Hassouneh
- Location: Hebron, West Bank, Palestine; 31°32′1″N 35°5′50″E
- Website: www.ppu.edu

Palestine Polytechnic University (PPU; Arabic: جامعة بوليتكنك فلسطين) is a university located in Hebron, West Bank, Palestine. The school was founded in 1978 by the University Graduates Union (UGU).

PPU has six colleges: Engineering and Technology, Medicine and Life Sciences, IT and Computer Engineering, Applied Sciences, Administrative Sciences and Informatics, and Applied Professions.

Palestine Polytechnic University is a member of Association of Arab Universities.

== History ==
The university was established by the University Graduates Union (UGU), a non-profit organization in Hebron, in 1978, as an engineering technical college. The university granted a three-year diploma in the field of technical education for electrical, mechanical, civil, and architectural engineering. Beginning in 1991, the university granted a bachelor's degree in mechanical engineering and computer systems, and established the Faculty of Applied Professions, which grants a diploma degree for about twenty-five disciplines. In 2018, it established the College of Medicine and Health Sciences, first program of its kind in the Hebron Governate.

In 2019, the "Palestinian-Korean Center for Biotechnology" was opened, which was funded by the Korea International Cooperation Agency. The buildings goal was to expand research capacity.

== Campus ==
The university is located in Hebron, in the neighborhoods of Wadi Al-Huriya and Abu Rumman.

=== Wadi Al-Huriya ===
The Wadi Al-Huriya area contains Buildings A, B, and C of the university. Building A contains the College of Applied Professions, computer laboratories, teaching halls and offices. Building B contains the Faculty of Engineering and Technology, Faculty of Humanities and Faculty of Applied Sciences. Building C contains University Administration, vice president's offices, Faculty of Information Technology and Computer Engineering, Faculty of Nursing, University Library and Warehouse, Faculty of Engineering Building: Office of the Deanship of Scientific Research, Department of Mechanical Engineering, Department of Electrical Engineering, laboratories of the two departments and Department of Architecture and Civil Engineering, Faculty of Information Technology and Computer Engineering, Registration and Finance Offices, the president's office, and other administrative offices of the university.

Abu Rumman Abu Rumman contains the Faculty of Administrative Sciences and Information Systems building, Palestinian-Korean National Center for Biotechnology Research and the Joint Human Medicine Program, and the Friends of Fawzi Kaoush Center for Information Technology and the Department of Continuing Education.

== See also ==
- List of universities and colleges in Palestine
- Education in Palestine
