= Al-Istiqlal University =

University in the State of Palestine

Coordinates: 31.8774°N 35.4570°E

- جامعة الاستقلال
- Established: 2007
- Location: Jericho, West Bank, Palestine
- Website: https://alistiqlal.edu.ps/ar

Al-Istiqlal University (Arabic: جامعة الاستقلال) is a Palestinian university located in the city of Jericho. It is considered the newest of the Palestinian public universities and the first and only one specializing in security, military, and police sciences.

== Establishment ==
Its foundation stone was laid in 1998 under the name The Palestinian Academy for Security Sciences. It was inaugurated in 2007 as a higher education institution. In 2011, it was converted into a university. The university became associated with the Mediterranean Universities Union in 2023.

== Colleges ==
- College of Humanities (or Faculty of Humanities).
- College of Administrative Sciences (or Faculty of Administrative Sciences)
- College of Law (or Faculty of Law)
- Institute of Training and Development (or Training and Development Institute)

== See also ==
- Education in Palestine
- List of universities and colleges in Palestine
