= Ibrahimieh College =

College in Jerusalem

Coordinates: 31°47′11.49″N 35°14′29.33″E

- Type: Private
- Established: 1931
- President: Nihad Abu Gharbieh
- Administrative staff: unknown
- Undergraduates: unknown
- Postgraduates: unknown
- Location: East Jerusalem, Palestine
- Website: www.ibrahimieh.edu

Ibrahimieh College (Arabic: الكلية الابراهيمية بالقدس) is a private school and college in the a-Suwane neighborhood of East Jerusalem.

== History ==
Nihad Abu Gharbieh, who worked as a teacher at the Ibrahimieh National School in the Musrara quarter of Jerusalem, became the sole proprietor of the school in 1931. Since then it has expanded to include an elementary school, a high school and a community college that offers associate degrees (diploma) in child education, business administration, accounting and office management.

On May 24, 2010, the college signed an academic agreement with the Talal Abu-Ghazaleh College of Business in Amman, Jordan.

On 28 July 2022, its permanent license was cancelled by the Israeli Ministry of Education over incitement against Israel and the Israel Defense Forces in its textbooks. The college was given a conditional license for one year to amend its textbooks, failing which it would completely lose its operating license.

== Notable alumni ==
- Adnan al-Husayni

== See also ==
- Education in Palestine
