= Wael Radad =

Jordanian novelist, screenwriter and painter

- Born: 2 October 1979 (age 46); Ras al-Khaimah, United Arab Emirates
- Citizenship: Jordan
- Education: Bachelor of Accounting Mother School: Al-Quds Open University
- Occupations: Novelist and painter
- Awards: 1- He won the Sharjah Days Theatrical Competition in theatrical writing on the play The Fall of the Last Angel 2- He won the competitions of the sons of Sheikh Hazza bin Zayed Al Nahyan for the culture of the Arab child for the story of the tears of the small body

Wael Raddad (born in 1979) is a Jordanian screenwriter of Palestinian origin, the Emirate of Ras al-Khaimah in the United Arab Emirates, his birthplace and residence. He holds a B.A. in Accounting from Al-Quds Open University. He is considered one of the first and most important writers in Jordan and Palestine in the genres of horror, crime and science fiction. He has published more than 10 novels, and won several competitions, including the Sharjah Theatre Days Competition in theatrical writing for the play “The Fall of the Last Angel”.

== Career ==
Wael Muhammad Salih Qassem Radad was born in Ras al-Khaimah on October 2, 1979, where he still lives. He began writing fiction in 2009. The majority of his works revolve around the psychological corridors of the characters of his ambiguous novels, sometimes overwhelmed by many audio-visual hallucinations, in an atmosphere closer to mystery or science fiction.

== Publications ==
- Raddad published the following books:
- (2009) Clinical Death : Dar Aktub, Lebanon
- (2010) Memoirs of Drowned Rats : Dar Mamdouh Adwan, Syria
- (2010) Symphony of Valley of Shadow : Dar Sinbad for Media and Publishing, Egypt
- (2010) The Funeral of Angel : Novel House, Saudi Arabia
- (2010) Elevator No. 7 : Dar Sama for Publishing and Distribution, Egypt
- (2011) The Follower Guardian :Dar Sama for Publishing and Distribution, Egypt
- (2011) The Demon's Delegate : latinum Book House, Kuwait
- (2012) Infernal Angel: Platinum Book House, Kuwait
- (2013) I will give you sweets on condition that you die : Publications Company, Lebanon
- (2013) The Dark Scenario : Prince of Nightmares: Dar Sama for Publishing and Distribution, Egypt
- (2013) The Dark Scenario 2 : TheSecret Detective: Dar Sama for Publishing and Distribution, Egypt
- (2016) Al- Majja (The Shelter) : Dar l-Rawaq for Publishing and Distribution, Egypt
- (2016) My Best Devil : Dar Sma for Publishing and Distribution, Egypt
- (2019) The Naughty Club : Ibeidi Publishing House, Egypt

== Achievements ==
- He won the Sharjah Days Theater Competition in theatrical composition of the play The Fall of the Last Angel.
- He won the competitions for the children of Sheikh Hazza bin Zayed Al Nahyan for the culture of the Arab child, for the story of the tears of the small body.

== Also read ==
- Basma Elkholy
