= Wael Raddad =

Jordanian novelist, painter, and writer

- Born: October 2, 1972 (age 53)
- Education: Bachelor in Accounting from Al-Quds Open University
- Awards: Sharjah Theatrical Days competition for theatrical composition for the performance "The Last Fall of the Angel".; The sons of Sheikh Hazza bin Zayed Al Nahyan competitions for the culture of the Arab child for the story of dumue aljisd alsaghir ('Tears of the Small Body').

Wael Muhammad Saleh Qasim Raddad (Arabic:وائل رداد) is a Jordanian novelist, painter and writer who was born in 1979 and raised in the United Arab Emirates, specifically in Ras al-Khaimah. He is of Palestinian origin. Raddad holds a BA in accounting from Al-Quds Open University. He is considered one of the most important writers in Jordan and Palestine in crime, horror, and science fiction literature. He published more than ten novels. His performance "Last Fall of the Angel" won a theatrical competition held in Sharjah, the Sharjah Theatrical Authoring Contest.

== Education and career ==
Raddad started writing novels in 2009. Most of his work revolves around the psychological, auditory and visual hallucinations that the characters represent in most of his novels. His novels are also marked by mystery and science fiction themes.

== Published novels ==
Raddad has published the following books:

- Mawt saririui ('Clinical death'). Lebanon Dar Ikteb, 2009.
- Mudhkirat Aljurdhan Alghariqa ('Diary of the Drowned Rats'). Damascus: Dar Mamduh Eudwan, 2010.
- Siamfuniat wadi alzilal ('The symphony of the Valley of Shadows'). Egypt: Dar Sinbad Media and Publishing, 2010.
- Jinazat Almalayika ('The funeral of angels'). Saudi Arabia: Dar Rewayah, 2010.
- Almasead Raqm 7 ('Elevator No. 7'). Egypt: Dar Sama for Publishing and Distribution, 2010.
- Alttabie alharishe ('The Guardian Subordinate'). Egypt: Dar Sama for Publishing and Distribution, 2011.
- Mandub alshaytan ('The Devil's Delegate'). Kuwait: Dar Platinum Book, 2011.
- Malak Jahannami. Kuwait: Dar Platinum Book, 2012.
- Sa'uetik Alhulwaa Ahrt 'an Tamut ('I Will Give You Sweets As Long As You Die'). Lebanon, All Prints Distributors & Publishers, 2013.
- Alsiynariu Almzlm: 'Amir Alkawabis ('The Dark Scenario: The Prince of Nightmares'). Egypt: Dar Sama for Distribution, and Publishing, 2013.
- Alsiynariu Almuzlim 2: Almuhaqiq Alsiriy ('Dark Scenario 2: The Secret Investigator'). Egypt: Dar Sama for Publishing, 2013.
- Almlja ('The Refuge'). Egypt, Dar Alrewaq for Publishing and Distribution, 2016
- 'Afdal shaytan li ('My Best Devil'). Egypt, Dar Sama for Publishing and Distribution, 2016.
- Nadi al'ashqia' ('The Naughty Club'). Egypt: Dar Ibiidi for Publishing, 2019.

== Awards ==
- He won the Sharjah Theatrical Days competition for theatrical composition for the performance "The Last Fall of the Angel".
- He won the sons of Sheikh Hazza bin Zayed Al Nahyan competitions for the culture of the Arab child for the story of dumue aljisd alsaghir ('Tears of the Small Body').
