= Asma Mustafa =

Palestinian teacher

- Citizenship: Palestinian
- Education: Islamic University of Gaza
- Occupation: teacher
- Known for: teaching English
- Awards: Global Teacher Award (2020)

Asma Mustafa (Arabic: أسماء مصطفى) is a Palestinian educator and activist. She won the Global Teacher Award in 2020.

== Career ==
She obtained her graduation from the English language department at the Islamic University of Gaza in 2008.

Mustafa is known for her out-of-the box thinking approach when it comes down to her teaching methods. She implemented paradigm shift approach using creative ideas to teach English-language to her students through games and imaginary trips around the world. She did all this while living in the blockaded enclave in cornered part of State of Palestine with very limited access to the outside world.

She has been teaching English at Halima Al Saadia Intermediate School for Girls in Gaza. She continued her work in teaching English to students amid the height of the COVID-19 pandemic as the pandemic literally brought world to a standstill. She was adjudged as the winner of Creative Teacher of Palestine Award for the year 2022. During the COVID-19 pandemic induced lockdown period, she apparently came up with a creative solution called "Teachers Behind Screens" initiative with the intention of training teachers virtually.

She was adjudged as the outright winner of the Global Teacher Award in 2020 following a stiff competition from the fellow teachers across the world. She won 2020 Global Teacher Award after participating in the teachers competition where she also presented her own thought process to judges on how to utilise creative resources in teaching students. She is widely acknowledged for her notable work in writing books such as The Forty-Five Games to Teach English to Non-Native Speakers and Educational Trips Around the World to Teach English Language Skills.

In 2024, she was apparently displaced in Al-Mawansi area in Rafah due to the war between Israel and Palestine.

== See also ==
- Hanan Al Hroub
