= Kamalain Shaath =

Palestinian civil engineer; president of the Islamic University of Gaza

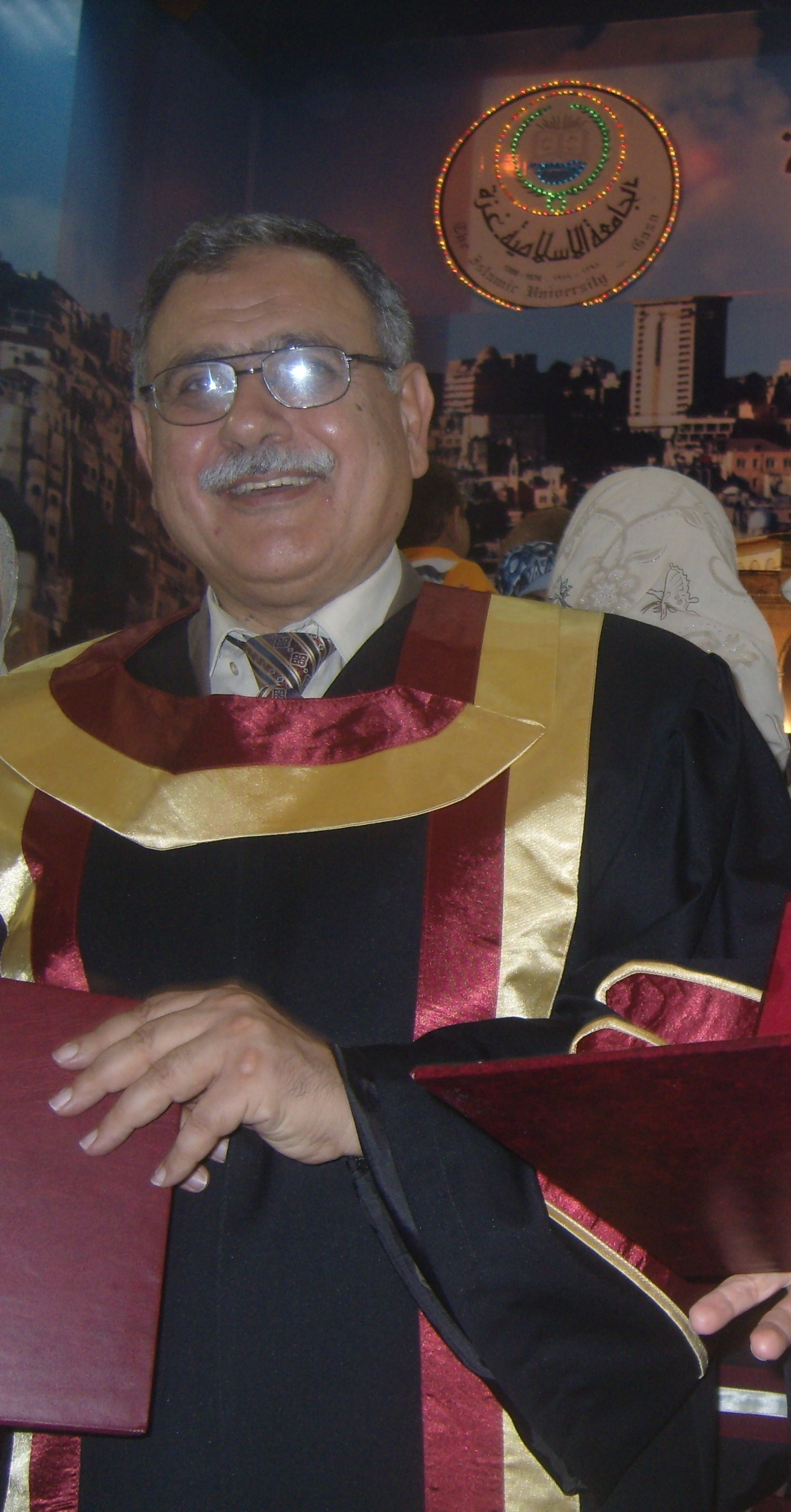
Dr. Kamalain Shaath

Kamalain Kamel Shaath is a former president of the Islamic University of Gaza (IUG). He has a Ph.D. degree in civil engineering. Prior to his presidency, he was a professor at the Civil Engineering department at the same university. He received his Ph.D. from The University of Leeds in UK, M.Sc. from United States and B.Sc. from Cairo University, Egypt, all in civil engineering.

== Career ==
He was the president of the Islamic University of Gaza from 2005 to 2015, and as of 2025 is the vice chair of the Board of Trustees of the university.
