= Palestine Ahliya University =

University in Bethlehem, West Bank, Palestine

- جامعة فلسطين الأهلية
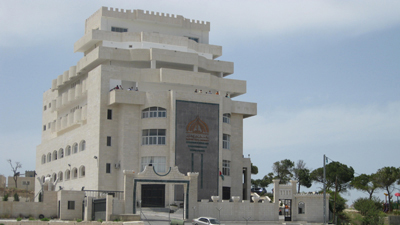
- Established: 2007
- Location: Bethlehem, West Bank, Palestine; 31°41′44″N 35°11′15″E
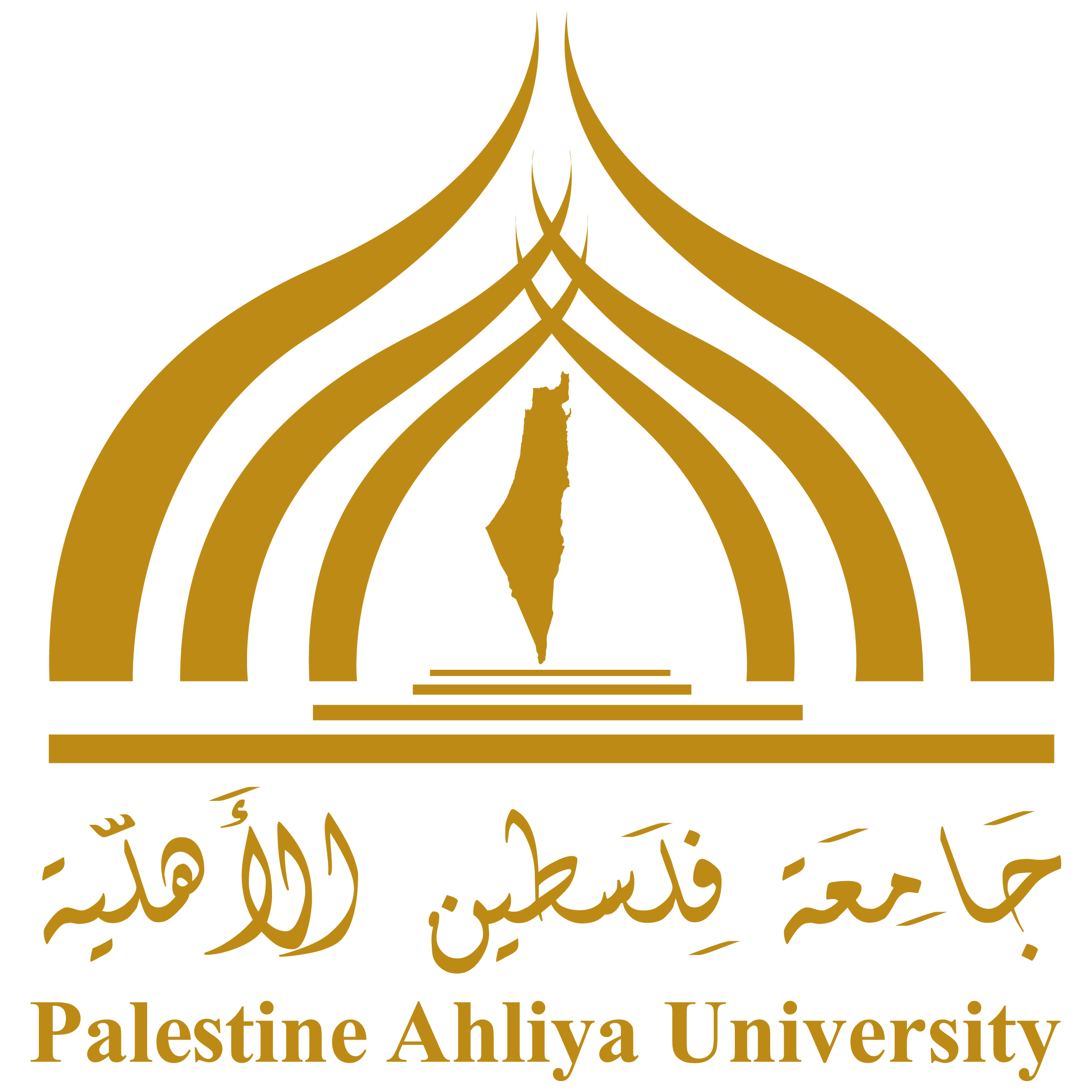

Palestine Ahliya University (Arabic: جامعة فلسطين الأهلية) is a private higher education institution located in the city of Bethlehem, West Bank, Palestine.

== History and location ==
PAU was initially established during the 2006-2007 academic year under the name "Palestine Ahliya University College". It was officially granted full university status in 2018. Its campus is situated in Bethlehem, in close proximity to the Dheisheh Refugee Camp.

== Academics and degrees ==
The University grants degrees at various levels, including Master's degrees, Bachelor's degrees, and Intermediate Diploma degrees in a variety of modern and diverse specializations.

As of 2025, the university offered at least 60 academic programs at the diploma, bachelor's, master's, and doctoral levels.

== Faculties ==
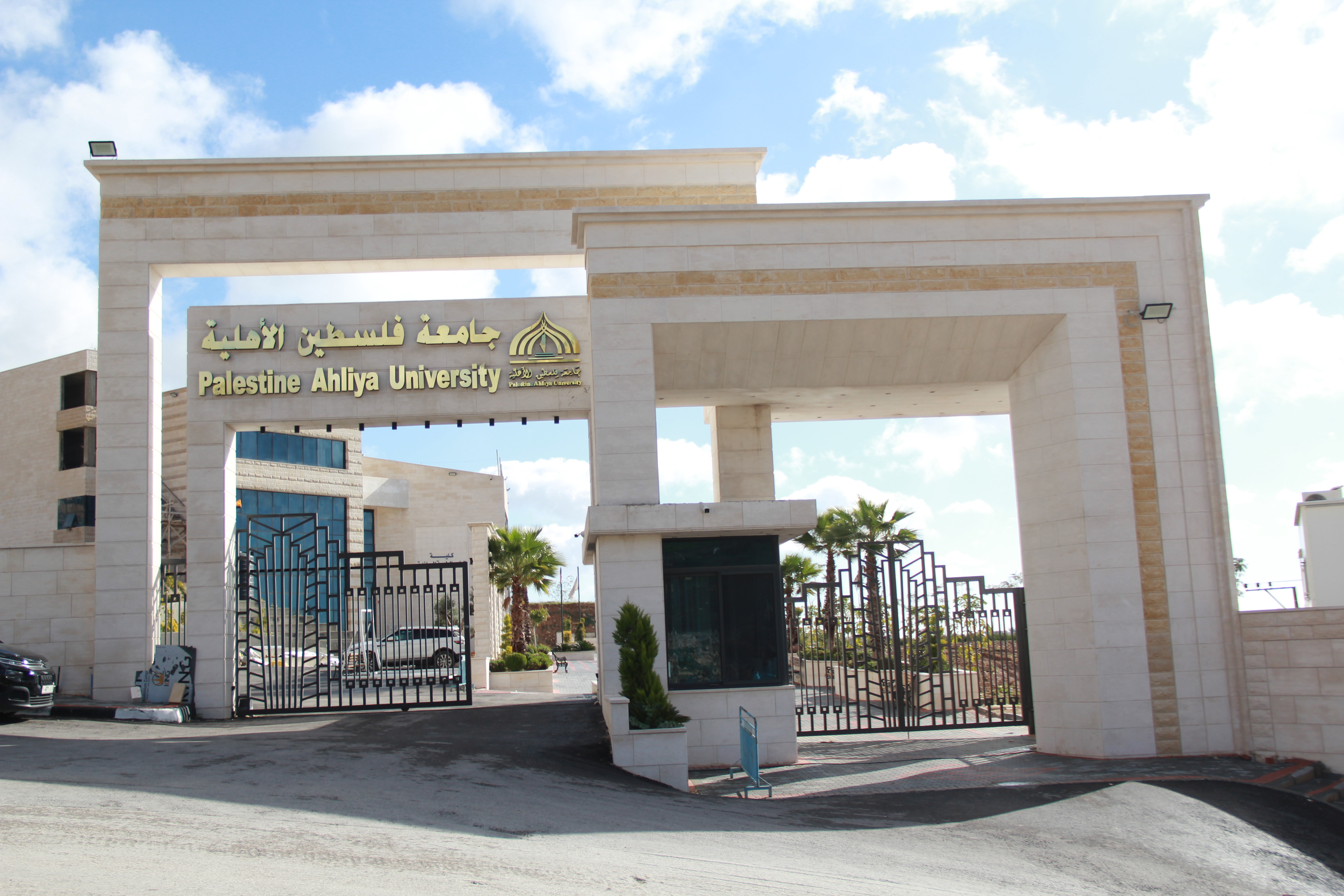
Palestine Ahliya University

The University comprises several faculties (colleges), which include:

- Faculty of Postgraduate Studies
- Faculty of Administrative and Financial Sciences
- Faculty of Engineering and Information Technology
- Faculty of Allied Medical Sciences
- Faculty of Law
- Faculty of Applied Professions and Sciences

== See also ==
- Education in Palestine
- List of universities and colleges in Palestine
