= Islamic University of Gaza =

Private university in Gaza City, Palestine

Coordinates: 31°30′47.23″N 34°26′25.64″E

- الجامعة الإسلامية غزة
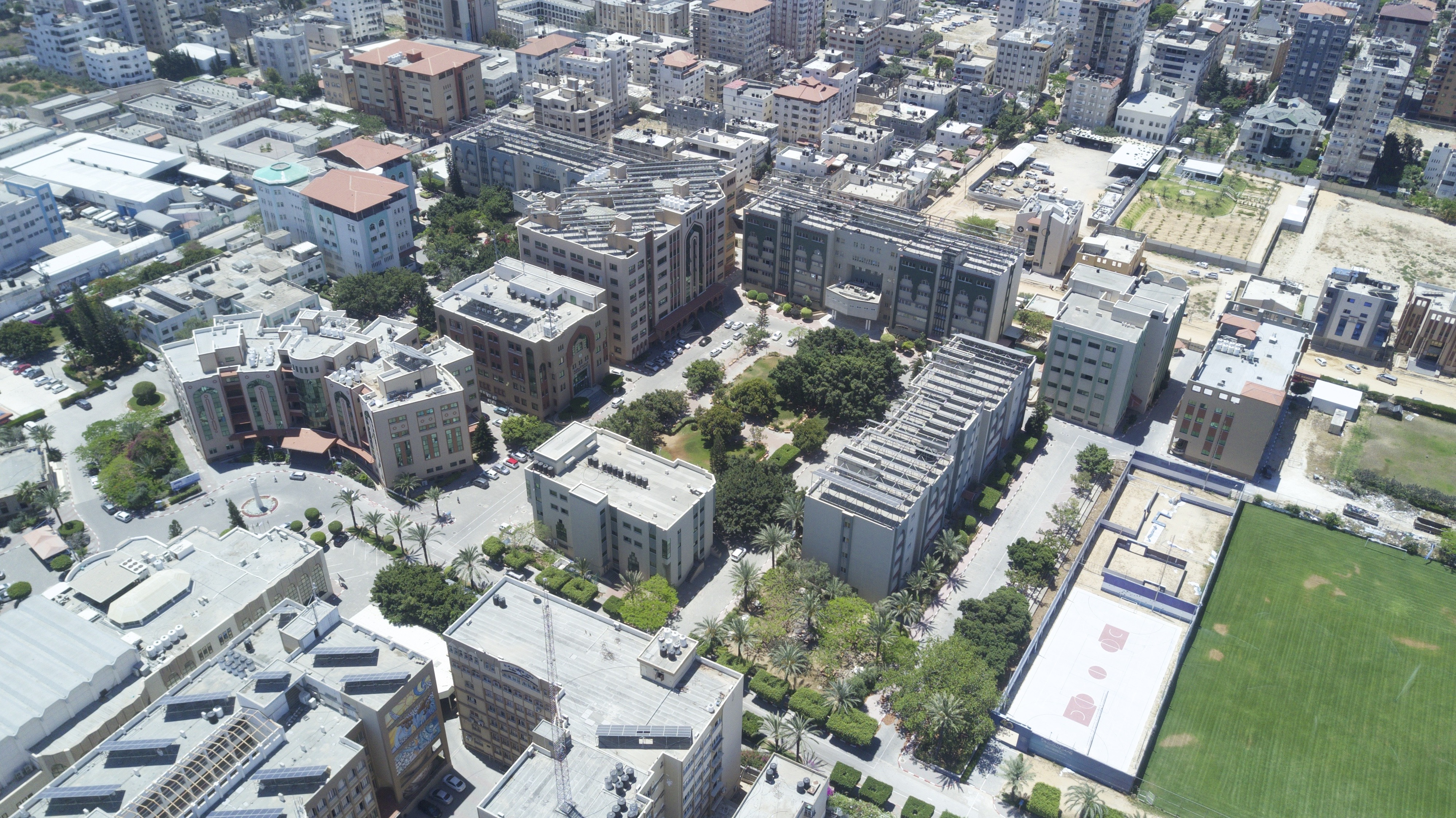
- The campus in 2021
- Type: Public
- Established: 1978; 48 years ago
- Academic staff: 307 (in 2022)
- Students: 17,874 (in 2022)
- Undergraduates: 16,212 (in 2022)
- Postgraduates: 1,662 (in 2022)
- Location: Gaza, Gaza Strip, Palestine
- Colors: White and green
- Website: www.iugaza.edu.ps

The Islamic University of Gaza (Arabic: الجامعة الإسلامية بغزة, romanized: al-Jāmiʻah al-Islāmīyah bi-Ghazzah), also known as IUG and IU Gaza, is an independent Palestinian university established in 1978 in Gaza City. It is the first higher education institution to be established in the Gaza Strip. The university has 11 faculties capable of awarding BA, BSc, MA, MSc, MD, PhD, diplomas and higher diplomas, in addition to 20 research centers and institutes and the affiliated Turkish-Palestinian Friendship Hospital.

The Islamic University of Gaza suffered damage in air strikes during the 2008–2009 Gaza war, the 2014 Israel–Gaza conflict, and the Gaza war.

On 10 October 2023, Israel bombed and destroyed the university campus. In December 2023, Professor Sufyan Tayeh, the university's president and a prominent scientist, was killed along with his family in an Israeli air strike on Jabalia refugee camp.

The university is considered the top-ranked University in the Gaza Strip.

== History ==
=== Founding ===
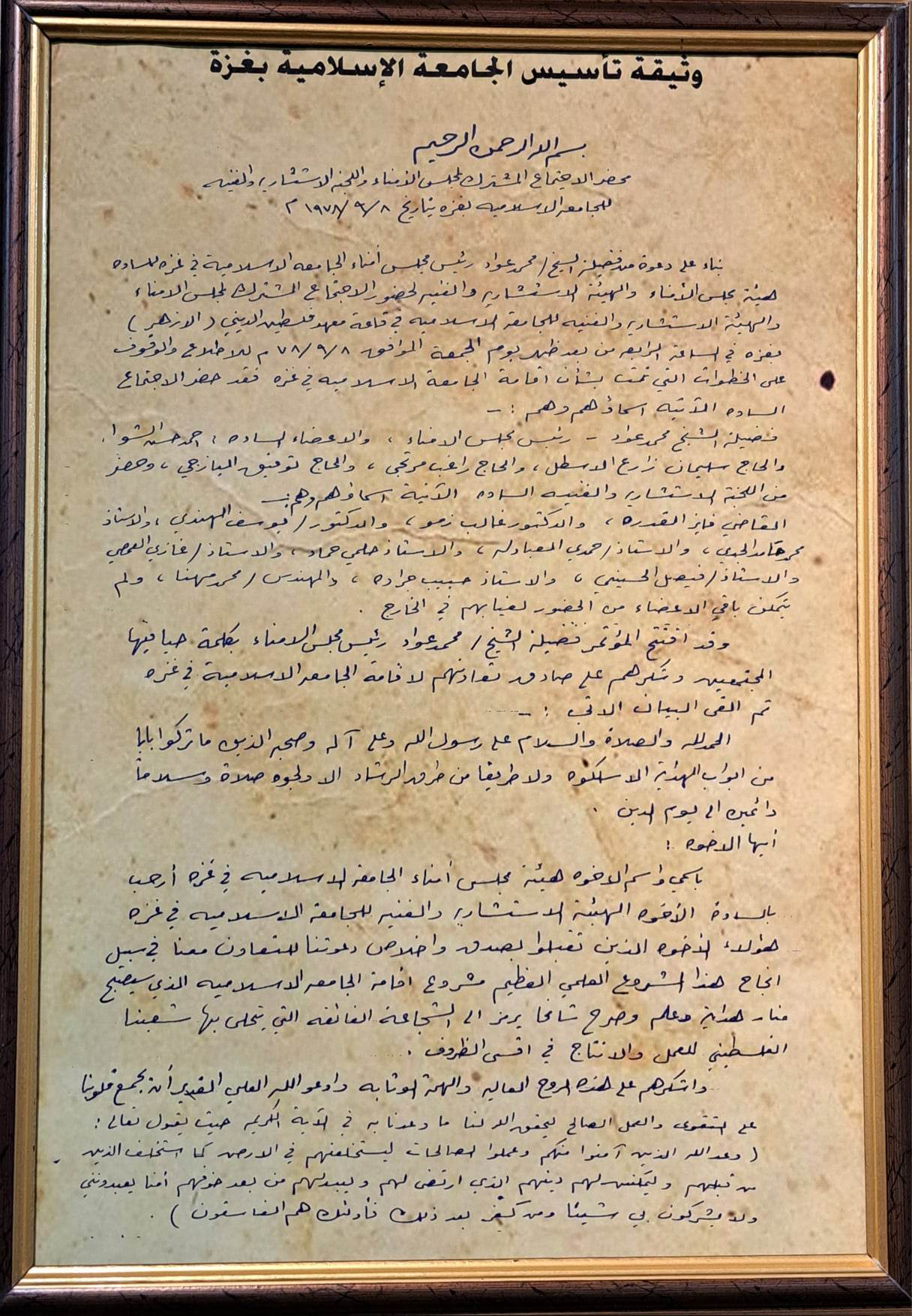
A copy of IUG foundation document, IUG museum (2023)

No universities or higher education institutions existed in the occupied West Bank and Gaza Strip until 1972. Before then, Palestinian high school graduates sought higher education abroad, mostly in Egyptian and Jordanian universities. However, travel restrictions after the Israeli occupation of the West Bank and Gaza Strip in 1967, economic problems, and quotas on the admission of Palestinian students to Arab universities changed this situation. Initiatives by local elders and community leaders were set in motion to establish higher education institutions, often on the grounds of existing schools and colleges.

Sheikh Mohammad Awwad, then head of the Gaza Chapter of the Azhari Institute, led the Islamic University's founding committee. On 12 April 1978, the committee announced the opening of three faculties: Sharia, Usool-Deen, and Arabic Language (which later evolved into the Faculty of Arts). The university was inaugurated in November 1978 as an independent, nonprofit, gender-segregated university. It was the first higher education institution in the Gaza Strip. The Faculty of Education was founded in 1980 and the Faculties of Commerce and Arts the following year. The Faculties of Nursing and Engineering were founded in 1993. In 2005, the Faculty of Information Technology was founded, followed by the Faculty of Medicine in 2006.

Chairmen of the IUG Board of Trustees
Name	Service Years
Mohammad Awwad	1978-1994
Jamal Al-Khoudari	1994-2014
Nasr al-Din Al-Muzaini	2014-2022
Mohammad Al-Aklouk	2022 - To date

The establishment of the Faculty of Nursing was held up until 1993 and it took time to obtain building permits. The academic freedom of the university was restricted and staff movement was limited by Military Order 854. The university was granted a temporary license that required annual renewal, and it was denied tax exemptions.

=== February 2007 fighting between Fatah and Hamas ===
In February 2007, during the height of fighting between Hamas and Fatah, the dominating party in the Palestine Liberation Organization (PLO), the Palestinian Authority (PA) Presidential Guards and Fatah militiamen stormed the Islamic University campus using mortars and rocket-propelled grenades, setting the library building and parts of the computer center and science building on fire.

=== December 2008 bombing ===
Just after midnight on 28/29 December 2008 local time, the university was bombed in six air strikes by the Israeli Air Force during the 2008 Gaza War. An Israeli army spokeswoman told The Chronicle of Higher Education that university facilities were being used by Hamas to develop and store weapons including Qassam rockets used to target Israeli civilians. Hamas denied the Israeli allegation.

Several international academic institutions proceeded to express their commitment to support IUG and other universities in Gaza. The International Association of Universities, of which IUG is a member, claimed to have written to the university to express its deep concern over the effects of the war, and to be ready to mobilize its member universities in support of the rebuilding efforts of the university. Similarly, Prof. Espen Bjertness of the University of Oslo and member of the Steering Committee of PEACE, stressed that "the sad situation for all academics caused by the bombing of our member university, Islamic University, Gaza and of the Gaza Community Mental Health Program calls for appropriate action".

=== 2014 Gaza war ===
The university was bombed again during the 2014 Israel–Gaza conflict: on 2 August, an Israeli airstrike targeted the administration building, causing severe damage to the building and to nearby buildings. The Israeli army claimed it targeted a "weapon development" centre in the university, which the university denied.

In 2017, academics at the university worked with the Ministry of Tourism and Antiquities to oppose the demolition of Tell es-Sakan, an Bronze Age archaeological site.

=== 2023 Gaza war ===
On the night of 10 October 2023, during the opening week of the Gaza war, the university's Gaza City campus was bombed and its buildings destroyed. Israeli forces alleged that the university had served as a "training institution for the development and production of weapons." The neighboring Al-Azhar University campus was also bombed during the same night. In November 2024, the university stated that 16 buildings, the central library, over 240,000 books, 8,000 periodicals, and more than 16,000 master's and doctoral theses had been destroyed during the war. From 2023 to 2024, 56 academic and administrative employees of the university were killed, including university president Sufyan Tayeh.

The university operated limited online classes during the war. In-person classes resumed on 30 November 2025.

== Relationship with Hamas ==
According to the Chronicle of Higher Education, the Islamic University was co-founded by one of the future founders of Hamas, Sheikh Ahmed Yassin, in 1978. In June 1996, then-Congressman Chuck Schumer argued that the Islamic University of Gaza was "known as a Hamas bastion."

In 2006, Jameela El Shanty, a professor at the university, said that "Hamas built this institution. The university presents the philosophy of Hamas. If you want to know what Hamas is, you can know it from the university."

The Washington Institute for Near East Policy wrote in a piece on USAID funding of organisations with possible links to terrorism that connections exist between the university and Hamas. The U.S. Office of the Inspector General said in a 2007 audit of U.S. assistance to Palestinian universities that the IUG has been vetted eight times between 2002 and 2007, concluding that "the vetting did not reveal information that would preclude the awards from proceeding".

Steven Erlanger, former Jerusalem bureau chief of the New York Times, described the IUG as "one of the prime means for Hamas to convert Palestinians to its Islamist cause," in a 2007 piece about Palestinian infighting and Israeli airstrikes on the Gaza Strip. This report was criticised by political economist Sara Roy of Harvard University, who stated that "there can be no question that Hamas works within the framework of Islamic institutions in the Gaza Strip, and that there are certain direct links between Hamas and many of the social and economic institutions (in the strip). ... However, it is far more questionable whether an automatic and inevitable link exists between Hamas and Islamic social and economic institutions, whether those links are inherently subversive, or whether such institutions promote radicalism and violence as is commonly assumed." Roy also wrote: "logic maintains, institutional clients become automatically linked to Hamas and constitute a base of support for political Islam. As a result, Islamic social institutions become recruiting centers for the Hamas's military wing. There is however, little hard evidence to support any of these allegations."

In 2010, journalist Thanassis Cambanis wrote in the Boston Globe that the university was "the brain trust and the engine room of Hamas".

In October 2023, the Israeli military accused Hamas of turning the university "into a training camp for weapons development and military intelligence."

== Campus ==
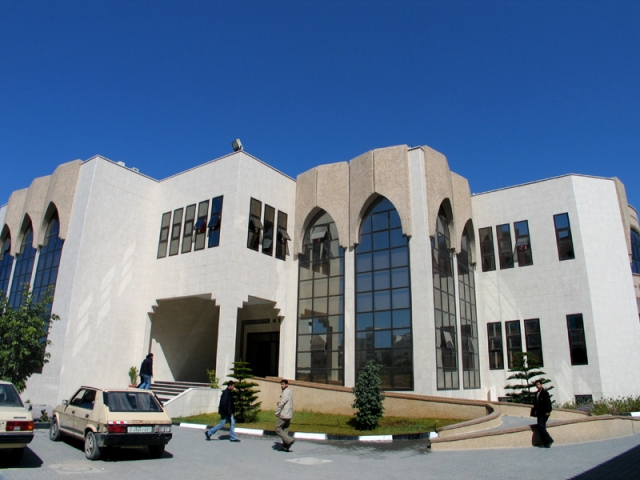
The main conference hall at IUG

The main campus is located in Gaza City, with branch campuses in Khan Yunis in the southern Gaza Strip and Al Zahra in the middle of Gaza Strip. The total area of the three campuses is 325,817 square meters (32.5817 hectares; 80.511 acres). The Al Zahra campus is home to the Faculty of Medicine and the Turkish-Palestinian Friendship Hospital.

The campus hosted an array of science laboratories, libraries, computer labs, and research centers prior to its demolition by the Israeli military.

== Rankings ==
IUG Rankings
Category	Rank	Year	Ranking
Global Impact Rankings	601–800th	2023	Times Higher Education
Arab University Impact Rankings	91-100th	2023	Times Higher Education
Overall percentile	75th	2023	Scimago Institutions Rankings
Research percentile	57th	2023	Scimago Institutions Rankings
Innovation percentile	87th	2023	Scimago Institutions Rankings
Societal percentile	60th	2023	Scimago Institutions Rankings

== Donors ==
Donors to the university include Arab Student Aid International, United Palestinian Appeal, Islamic Relief, the British Council, the World Bank, USAID, the Islamic Development Bank and Human Appeal International.

== Notable faculty ==
- Sufyan Tayeh was the president of the Islamic University of Gaza and a leading researcher in physics and applied mathematics. He was appointed UNESCO chair for Physical and Astrophysical sciences in Palestine and was named on the "top 2% of scientists worldwide identified by Stanford University" list in 2021. Tayeh was killed in an Israeli airstrike on the Jabalia refugee camp during the Gaza war.
- Refaat Alareer was a professor of literature who was killed in an Israeli airstrike in 2023, along with his brother, sister and her three children, during the Israeli invasion of the Gaza Strip.
- Abdel Aziz al-Rantisi, co-founder of Hamas
- Abelhaleem Hasan Abdelraziq Ashqar, Palestinian convicted of criminal contempt and obstruction of justice for refusal to testify in a trial related to the funding of Hamas in the US
- Yunis Al Astal, Hamas leader and member of the Hamas Parliament
- Nizar Rayan, high-ranking Hamas leader
- Kamalain Shaath, former president
- Ismail Abu Shanab, one of the founders of Hamas
- Ayman Taha, senior Hamas official and spokesman in the Gaza Strip

== Notable alumni ==
- Refaat Alareer, professor of literature
- Wael Al-Dahdouh, journalist
- Khalil al-Hayya, senior Hamas official
- Mohammed Dahlan, opposition politician
- Fathi Hamad, political leader of Hamas
- Ismail Haniyeh, senior political leader of Hamas, chairman of the Hamas political bureau
- Ahmed Jabari, senior leader and second-in-command of the military wing of Hamas, the Izz ad-Din al-Qassam Brigades
- Asma Mustafa, teacher and activist, 2020 Global Teacher of the Year
- Yahya Sinwar, former leader of Hamas in the Gaza Strip.
- Sami Abu Zuhri, senior spokesman for Hamas
- Ismail al-Ghoul, Al Jazeera Arabic journalist

== See also ==
- List of Islamic educational institutions
- List of universities and colleges in Palestine
- Education in Palestine
