= Talal Abu-Ghazaleh College of Business =

Talal Abu-Ghazaleh Graduate School of Business
- Established: 2006
- Location: Amman, Jordan
- Website: www.tagcb.edu.jo

Talal Abu-Ghazaleh Graduate School of Business (TAGSB; Arabic: كلية طلال أبوغزاله لإدارة الأعمال) was inaugurated on February 27, 2006 in Amman, Jordan as one of the faculties of the German-Jordanian University (GJU). GJU is a public university that was established in 2004 through a joint co-operation between the German and the Jordanian governments.

TAGSB represents the first partnership of its kind in the Arab World between the public and the private sectors.

The College offers MBA programs with concentrations in international accounting, management and quality management. It also offers three undergraduate programs in international accounting, management and logistics.

The College's facilities include an Audio Visual Language Center and a number of computer laboratories including a specialized laboratory equipped with Sun computers. The College's Library houses many volumes of reference material and it is equipped with computers connected through Memberships to international libraries which are available for free for the students of the faculty.

== Degrees offered ==
- MBA with concentration in Management
- MBA with concentration in International Accounting
- MBA with concentration in Quality Management
- MBA with concentration in Marketing
- MBA with concentration in Human resources
- MBA with concentration in Banking and Finance
