= Sufian Tayeh =

Palestinian scientist (1971–2023)

- سفيان تايه
- Born: Sufian Abdurrahman Osman Tayeh; 20 August 1971; Jabalia Camp, Gaza Strip, Palestine
- Died: 2 December 2023 (aged 52); Gaza Strip, Palestine
- Cause of death: Airstrike
- Other names: Abu Osama
- Education: UNRWA school
- Alma mater: Islamic University of Gaza
- Occupations: Lecturer, university professor and physicist, university president
- Employer: Islamic University of Gaza
- Scientific career
- Fields: Physics and applied mathematics

Sufian Tayeh (Arabic: سفيان تايه, romanized: Sufyān Tāyah; 20 August 1971 – 2 December 2023), often spelled Sofyan Taya and also known as Abu Osama, was a Palestinian scientist who served as president of the Islamic University of Gaza from August 2023 until his killing in December 2023.

Tayeh was a university professor and a researcher in physics and applied mathematics. He was killed, alongside all members of his family, in December 2023 by an Israel Defence Force airstrike.

== Early life and education ==
Sufian Tayeh was born in 1971 in Jabalia Camp of northern Gaza. He received his primary education in the UNRWA school in the camp. He obtained a Bachelor's degree in Physics from the Islamic University of Gaza in 1994 and in the same year he began working for the university.

== Career ==
He was a leading researcher in physics and applied mathematics. Tayeh was winner of the Palestine Islamic Bank Award for Scientific Research for the years 2019 and 2020, recipient of the Abdul Hameed Shoman Award for Young Arab Scientists and the Islamic University Award for Scientific Research for the year 2021.

Tayeh's research interests included optical waveguides, optical waveguide sensing, ellipsometry, dye-sensitized solar cells, and OLEDs. He was still research-active at the time of his killing.

== Death ==
He was killed in an airstrike on a residential building by the IDF during the Gaza War.
