= Health, Development, Information and Policy Institute =

Palestinian independent non-profit

Health, Development, Information and Policy Institute (HDIP)
- Established: 1989
- Director: Mahmoud Nawaja
- Location: Palestine
- Website: http://www.hdip.org

The Health, Development, Information and Policy Institute (HDIP) was established in 1989 by a group of researchers and health practitioners and development experts, including Dr. Mustafa Barghouthi MP, committed to improving the status of health care for all Palestinians. As an independent, non- profit Palestinian organization, HDIP specializes in policy research and planning regarding different development sectors in the West Bank and Gaza Strip.

The institute has expanded to serve as advocates for better government policies on behalf of marginalized groups such as women, youth and the disabled. It is devoted to building a democratic Palestinian civil society. In addition, HDIP provides information services, evaluations, and training in the areas of health, development policy and system management.

== Goals ==
- Contribute to the development of Palestine by addressing community needs in health, education, poverty reduction, good governance and other social areas;
- Help improve the level of coordination and cooperation between health care providers in the West Bank and Gaza Strip through information sharing and policy dialogue;
- Support other civil society organizations in lobbying for sound health and development policies and laws;
- Provide training in general management skills, systems management, rapid appraisal and research, and computer software programs;
- Conduct evaluations of, and consultations on health, development and systems management; and
- Empower local community structures.
