= Al-Quds Open University =

University in Palestine

Coordinates: 31°54′47″N 35°11′58″E

- Type: Open university
- Established: 1991
- President: Prof. Ibrahim Al-Shaer
- Undergraduates: 60,000+
- Location: All Palestinian cities, Palestine
- Website: www.qou.edu

Al-Quds Open University (Arabic: جامعة القدس المفتوحة) is an independent, distance education public university in Palestine. It was created by a decree issued by the Palestinian Liberation Organization (PLO) in 1991.

QOU is the first Open learning institute in Palestine. It has 60,000 students studying in 19 branches and centers distributed all over the West Bank and the Gaza Strip. QOU is the largest non-campus university in Palestine.

In 2023, the university's facilities in the Gaza Strip were destroyed by Israeli bombardment during the Gaza war.

== Faculties ==
The university has seven faculties leading to a BA Degree in:

- Technology and Applied Sciences
- Agriculture
- Social and Family Development
- Administrative and Economic Sciences
- Media
- Arts
- Educational sciences

QOU established a Faculty of Graduate Studies for the 2015-2016 school year. The faculty offers a master's degree in the following specializations:

- Arabic Language & Literature
- Psychological & Educational Counseling
- Digital Business Administration
- Political Science
- Education Technology and e-Learning
- Strategic Management & Leadership
- Applied Human Resource Management
- Management and Public Policy
- Information Technology
- Special Education
- Educational Supervision and Administration
- Social Work
- Teaching Social Science
- Islamic Da'wa and International Relations in Islam
- Family Counseling and Guidance
- Applied Marketing Management
- Accounting and Finance
- Management of Media Institutions
- Information Technology

The university has announced plans to create Post Graduate School in the future.

== University centers ==
The university has six centers located in Palestine, as follows:

- The Information and Communication Technology Center (ICTC) is responsible for the technical development, computerizing all administrative, academic, financial and productive works of the university.
  - The ICTC is the largest computerized network in Palestine, and is an accredited testing center for specialized international certificates. It also has most of its systems and curricula computerized. The network, a partnership with the Palestinian Development Gateway, was funded by the Programme for Assistance to the Palestinian People, part of the United Nations Development Programme.
- The Continuing Education Center (CEC) was created to make connections between academic knowledge and practical experience.
- Center for Digital Learning

== Membership in Arab and international educational unions ==
- Association of Arab Universities
- Federation of the Universities of the Islamic World

The university is twinned with Goldsmiths Student Union in London, UK.

== See also ==
- List of Islamic educational institutions
- List of universities and colleges in Palestine
- Education in Palestine
