= Durham Palestine Educational Trust =

The Durham Palestine Educational Trust
- Founded: 1984 (as the Durham Birzeit Studentship Fund); 2001 (Durham Palestine Educational Trust)
- Type: Charitable organization
- Registration no.: 1085097
- Purpose: "To aid the economic and social development of Palestine and to spread knowledge about Palestine in Durham area"
- Region served: Durham and Palestine
- Revenue: £166,859 (2021–22)
- Endowment: £1,563,639 (2022)
- Website: durhampalestine.webspace.durham.ac.uk

Durham Palestine Educational Trust (formerly Durham Birzeit Studentship Fund) is a British charity that offers scholarships to outstanding graduates in Palestine to take master's degree courses at Durham University.

== History ==
The trust was established in 1984 as the Durham Birzeit Studentship Fund to support students at Birzeit University to come to Durham for a year of their undergraduate degree. In 2001 it became the Durham Palestine Educational Trust, supporting graduates of any Palestinian university to pursue a master's degree at Durham.

== Activities ==
In 2015, the British Council's Voices magazine reported that "gaining quality international experience and being able to bring it back will be vital to the sustainability and growth of the local higher education sector, and consequently Palestinian society". The Durham Palestine Educational Trust was identified as one of three funding opportunities for study in the UK at that time.

In 2025, the chair of the trust and Mary Kelly Foy, the MP for the City of Durham, wrote to the Home Office to ask them to find alternative ways for four students in Gaza that had been given scholarships by the trust to obtain visas allowing them to travel to the UK, as there were no visa application centres in Gaza. A government spokesperson confirmed that they were aware of the situation and were trying to find a solution.

=== Scholarships ===
Two or more scholarships are offered each year for master's degrees at Durham. One of the conditions of these scholarships is that the student should be "an active ambassador for Palestinians" while in Durham, leading the Times of Israel to say that Durham has "a checkered history on the Israel-Palestine conflict". Other non-academic conditions of the scholarship include returning to the West Bank or Gaza after completing the course. The scholarship consists of two parts: a maintenance scholarship provided by the trust and a tuition fee scholarship provided by the university.

== Funding ==
Durham University contributes significantly by offering tuition fee scholarships to successful candidates. Funds necessary to cover the students' maintenance, travel and other costs are raised by voluntary donations from individuals, mainly current and retired staff of the University and other people in the Durham area. In 2019–20, the trust received a bequest from Bryan Fortescue, known as Paul Fortescue. The bequest established a permanent endowment called the Pauline Trust from which only the income on the capital may be expended. The total value of the Pauline Trust endowment as of 2022 was £1,563,639.

Fundraising has also included Easter book fairs on Palace Green, which were held annually from 2014 to 2022.
