= University College of Applied Sciences =

University in Gaza Strip, Palestine

Coordinates: 31°29′52.52″N 34°26′13.01″E

University College of Applied Sciences (UCAS)
- الكلية الجامعية للعلوم التطبيقية
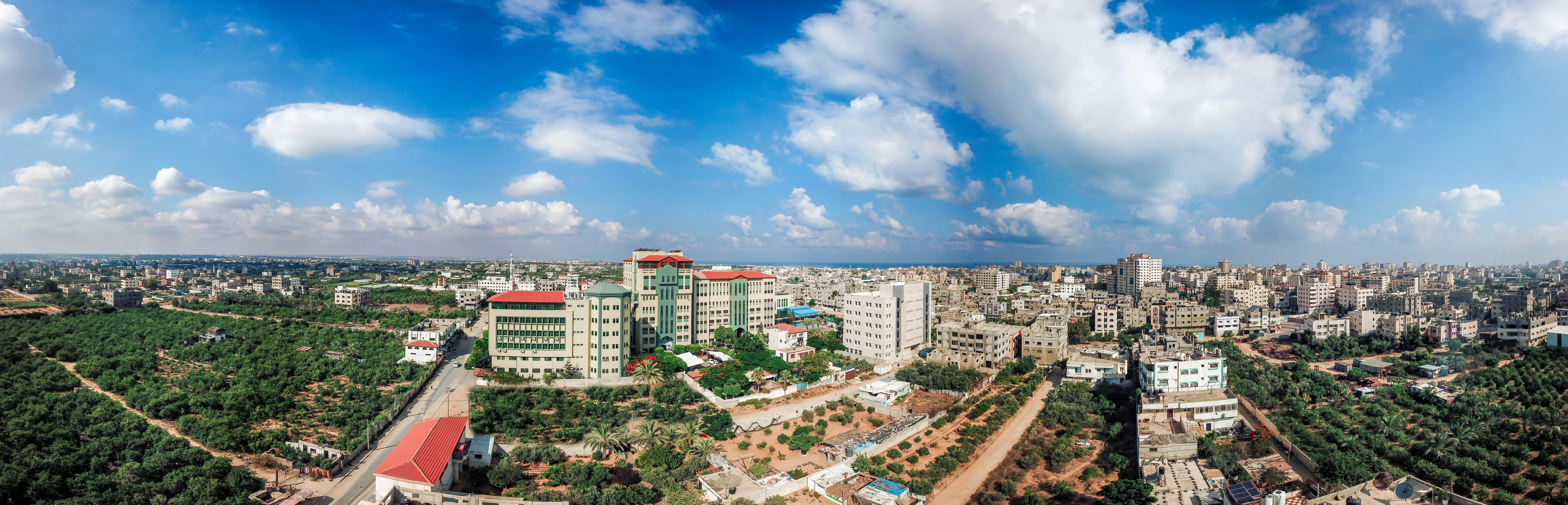
- Motto: Creating and developing together
- Type: Public
- Established: 1998
- President: Said Alzebda
- Vice-president: Muhammad Mushtaha
- Administrative staff: 318
- Undergraduates: 8500
- Location: Gaza, Gaza Strip, Palestine
- Campus: Gaza
- Website: https://en.ucas.edu.ps/

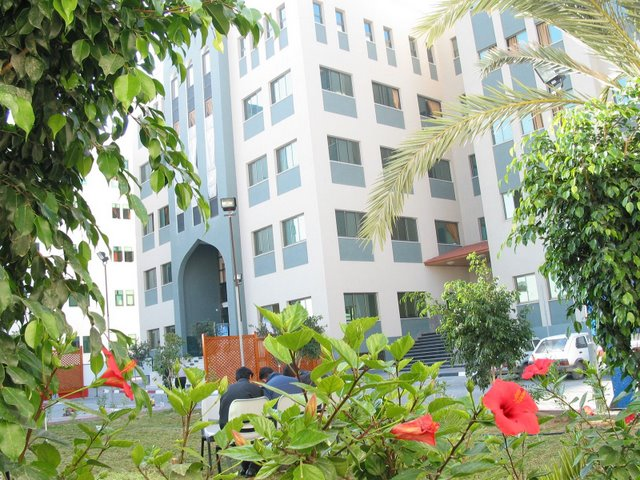
UCAS administration building

University College of Applied Sciences (UCAS) is a technical college in Gaza, Palestine founded in 1998. UCAS is a member of the International Association of Universities. UCAS offers 40 majors in engineering, health, technology, administration, education and the humanities. The school had a student population of 8,500 with its main campus in Gaza City. The College offers undergraduate degrees in a number of specializations such as education technology, technological management and planning, and geographic information systems.

Its campus buildings were completely destroyed by Israeli bombing during the Israel–Hamas war on 19 October 2023. Israeli forces then shelled Palestinians living amid the rubble of the university on January 22, 2024. The university's president, prominent academic Said Alzebda, was killed during the Gaza War on 31 December 2023.

Despite the destruction of its campus, in August 2024 the university announced a project to integrate medical students directly into Gaza's health sector via a five-month training program funded by Kuwait.

== Undergraduate programs ==
- Educational technology
- Technology management
- Geographic Information Systems
- Applied Accounting
- Development planning

== Diploma programs ==
- Information Technology
  - Library Science & Information Management
  - Multimedia Technology
  - Geographic Information Systems
  - Designing and Developing Web Sites
  - Databases and Programs
- Administration and Financial Science
  - Accounting
  - Administration & Office Automation
  - Administration & Office Automation
  - Sales Representative
- Engineering Professions
  - Surveying
  - Architecture
  - Interior Design
  - Arts & Crafts
  - Civil Engineering
  - Autotronics Engineering
  - Aluminum Technician (Professional Diploma - 1 year)
  - Automotive Transmission Technician
- Educational Science
  - Early Childhood Education
  - Supervision in Childhood Associations
  - Physical Education
- Health Professions
  - Nursing
  - Surgical Technologist
  - Medical Secretary
  - Midwife Nursing
  - Anesthesia and Resuscitation Technologies
  - Dentist Assistant
- Humanity Studies
  - Islamic Studies (Preachers)
  - Public Relations & Advertising
  - Social Work
  - Secretarial & Legal Studies
- Computer Tech. & Industrial Professions
  - Electromech Technician
  - Computer Maintenance
  - Electronics Instruments Technology
  - Internet and Computer Networks
  - Science Lab Technologist
  - (NEW) Information Security Engineering
- Rehabilitation Science
  - Articulation and Speech Problem Therapy
  - Community-based Rehabilitation
  - Physical Therapy
  - Orthotics & Prosthetics

=== Business incubator ===
UCAS has a start-up Business incubator that supports entrepreneurs in the Gaza Strip. It is a non-profit incubator that is 100% donor-funded to help aspiring entrepreneurs turn their ideas into successful businesses.

== Notable people ==
- Fatima Hassouna (1999 – 2025), photographer, documented the Gaza War, documentary film Put Your Soul on Your Hand and Walk
- Yahya Al-Sarraj, Mayor of Gaza City
