= Education in Palestine =

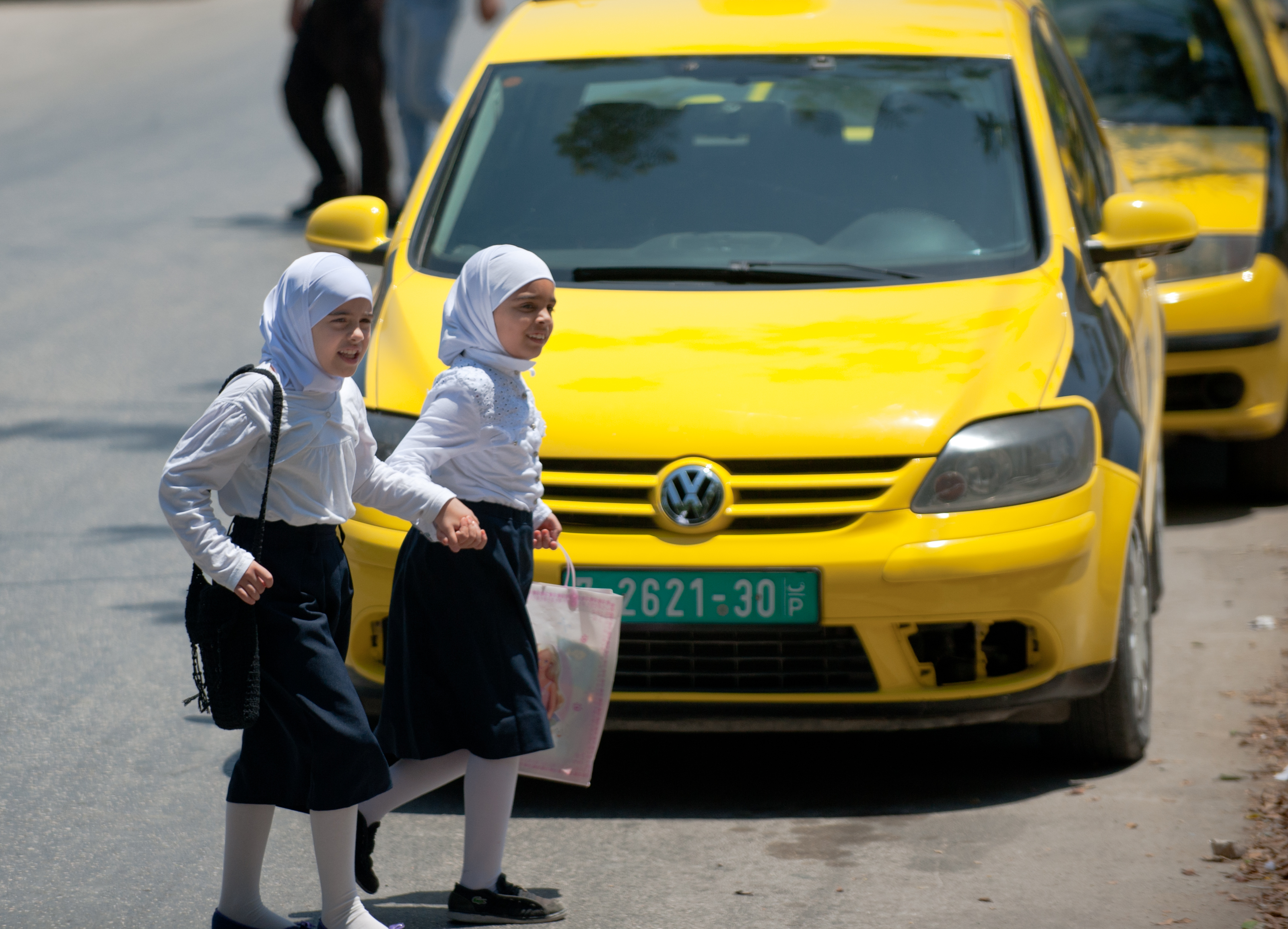
Palestinian girls in Nablus, 2011

Education in the State of Palestine refers to the educational system in the Gaza Strip and the West Bank, which is administered by the Palestinian Ministry of Education and Higher Education. Enrollment rates amongst Palestinians are relatively high by regional and global standards. According to a youth survey in 2003, 60% between the ages 10–24 indicated that education was their first priority. Youth literacy rate (the ages 15–24) was 98.2%, while the national literacy rate was 91.1% in 2006. The literacy rate ages 15-24 was 99.4% in 2016. Enrollment ratios for higher education were 45% in 2022. In 2016 Hanan Al Hroub was awarded the Varkey Foundation Global Teacher Prize for her work in teaching children how to cope with violence.

The Human Rights Measurement Initiative (HRMI) finds that Palestine is fulfilling 92.9% of what it should be fulfilling for the right to education based on the country's level of income. HRMI breaks down the right to education by looking at the rights to both primary education and secondary education. While taking into consideration Palestine's income level, the nation is achieving 91.0% of what should be possible based on its resources (income) for primary education and 94.9% for secondary education.

== System ==
There are three types of schools from perspective of gender in Palestine: boys' schools (37%), girls' schools (35%), and co-educational schools (29%).

In Palestine's education system, compulsory basic education includes Grades 1 to 10 and this is divided into the preparatory stage (Grades 1 to 4) and the empowerment stage (Grades 5 to 10). Secondary education (general secondary education and a few vocational secondary schools) covers Grades 11 and 12. In tertiary education, there are 11 universities (10 private and one public) and 11 technical colleges (4 Palestinian Authority, 2 UNRWA, 4 public and 1 private), all of which mainly offer four-year courses. Additionally, there are 19 community colleges (1 Palestinian Authority, 9 public, 2 UNRWA, and 7 private) that mainly offer two-year diploma courses in technical and commercial specializations.

The first refugee camp schools for were established by the Red Cross in 1949. First UNRWA elementary six-year schools begun in 1959–60 school year. UNRWA schools offer Grades 1 to 10 and do not provide secondary education (Grade 11 and 12). UNRWA's education provision has played a major role in Palestinian education since 1967.

Even if students in Grade 1 to 3 do not achieve well, they are not to repeat a grade at that level by the ministry policy. However, students in Grades 4 to 12 are to repeat by the ministry regulations (maximum of 5 percent of a class cohort), which is based on the students' total average achievement score for a year. There is no remedial teaching for the students nominated to repeat during their repeated year.

== Management ==
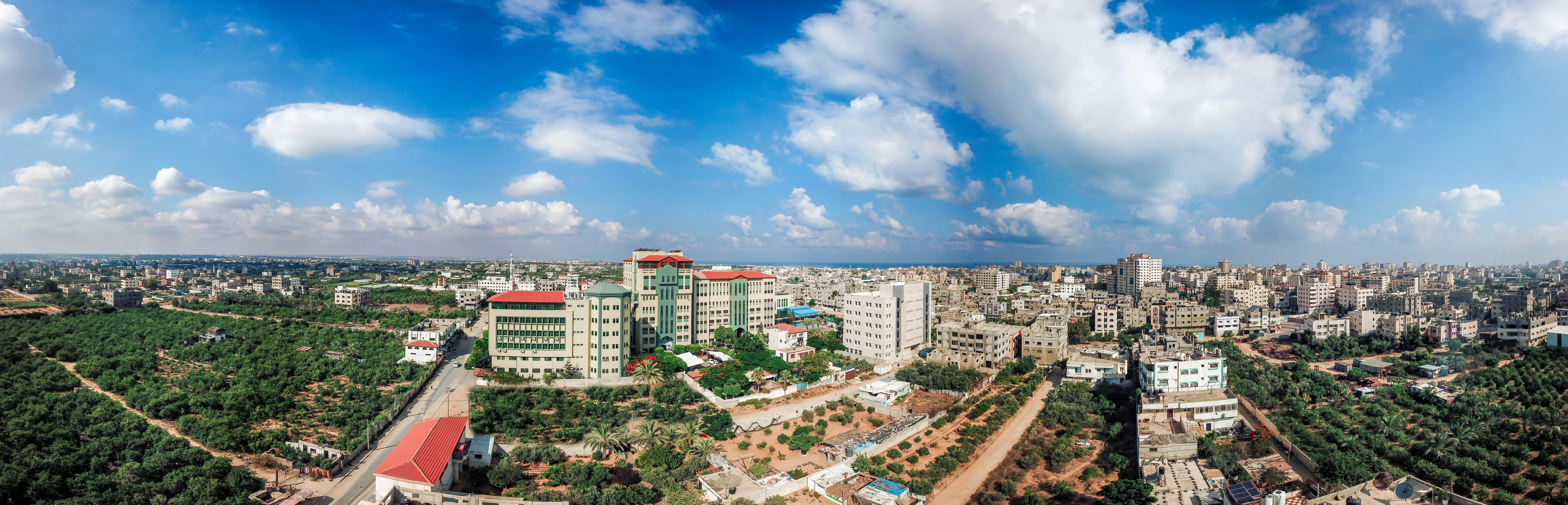
The campus of the University College of Applied Sciences in 2018

The Ministry of Education and Higher Education (MOEHE) was first established and took responsibility in 1994. (MOEHE website) In 1996, the MOEHE was divided into two separate ministries: the Ministry of Education and the Ministry of Higher Education, and these two ministries were merged again to become the MOEHE in 2002. (Nicolai 2007) The MOEHE has a responsibility for the whole education sector from pre-primary to higher education and for recruiting and training teachers as well. The MOEHE works as the liaison on training issues with the education directorates. (Mustafa and Bisharat 2008) The MOEHE is also in charge of managing governmental educational institutions and supervising private educational institutions and institutions run by United Nations Relief and Works Agency for Palestine Refugees in the Near East (UNRWA).

Education in Palestine is centralized in regard to its curriculum, textbooks, instructions, and regulations. The administrative structure of the general education is composed of 22 fields' directorates (districts offices) of education, including 16 in the West Bank and 6 in Gaza.

The mission of the MOEHE is 1) to ensure education for all, 2) improve its quality and its standards, and 3) to ultimately develop citizens with sound and balanced characters.

== Finance ==
Funding for the education system comes from the government budget through the Ministry of Finance. Government expenditure on education as % of total government expenditure is 17.9 in 2003. The remaining funding in education comes from donors and international organizations In Palestine, access to schools is primarily constrained by physical conditions and movement restrictions. However, insufficient investment in upgrading education has led to crowding and deterioration in the learning environment. Schools have lost their revenue base from fees, and faced difficulties in securing basic school supplies and materials. The limited services for students with special needs, facing psychological trauma, has also become evident. The inequity in resource allocation between the West Bank and the Gaza Strip has become serious as well.

== Policy ==
A formal sector plan was not developed until five years after the creation of the MOEHE but this does not mean that planning was ignored until then. A formal five-year plan was first discussed in 1998, and it took more than a year to prepare. UNESCO International Institute for Educational Planning (IIEP) provided technical assistance in developing the plan, and the MOEHE set up two working teams; one focused on policy and another worked the details. Five-Year Education Development Plan 2000–2005 had five goals: 1) to provide access to education for all children, 2) to improve the quality of education, 3) to develop formal and non-formal education, 4) to develop management capacity in planning, administration, finance, and 5) to develop human resources across the education system.

Education Development Strategic Plan (EDSP) 2008–2012 has four goals: 1) to increase access of school-aged children and students of all education levels and improve the ability of the education system to retain them (Access), 2) to improve the quality of teaching and learning (Quality), 3) to develop the capacity for planning and management and to improve the financial and management systems used (Management), and 4) to realize a gradual conversion of the higher education sector from a supply-oriented to a demand-oriented sector, which will gradually guarantee more compatibility between higher education outputs and labor market(s) need from qualitatively and quantitatively (Relevance). Goal 1 to 3 is for pre-school, general, non-formal, higher education, and vocational education, and Goal 4 is only for higher education and vocational education.

== Pre-primary education ==
Pre-primary education is for children, usually starting at 4 years and up to the age of 6 years. According to the 2004/2005 PCBS Educational Institutions Census, there were approximately 898 private kindergartens, and only 3 operated by the Palestinian Authority. (WB and BCRD 2006) Although most kindergartens are private, the MOEHE provides technical and educational supervision, teacher training and licensing, and some funding.

The number of male and female children was roughly equal, and most kindergartens have co-educational system. Gross enrollment ratios for pre-primary education are 29.9% for total, 30.3% for boys, and 29.5% for girls.

== Basic education ==
=== Preparation stage ===
In the preparatory stage, a total of 383,748 students (male 195,618 and female 188,130) were enrolled in schools during 2005/2006 school year. Among them, 238,500 students (62 percent of total) were in schools provided by Palestinian Authority, 109,419 students (29 percent) were in schools provided by UNRWA, and 35,829 students (9 percent) were in private schools.

Gross enrollment ratios for preparatory stage are 80.4% for total, 80.4% for boys, and 80.4% for girls.

There is no grading system (marks) or written tests in Grade 1 to 4. Teachers assess students on the basis of their progress through formative assessments, observations, student portfolios, and other assigned student work as the basis of their graduating judgment.

=== Empowerment stage ===
In the empowerment stage, a total of 569,873 students (male 296,247 and female 283,626) were enrolled in schools during the 2005–2006 school year. Among them, 398,672 students (70 percent of total) were in schools provided by the Palestinian Authority, 145,133 students (25 percent) are in schools provided by UNRWA, and 26,068 students (5 percent) were in private schools. Gross enrollment ratios for empowerment stage were 97.5% for total, 95.7% for male, and 99.5% for female students.

There is a graduating examination in Grade 9. This examination is offered to students who have not completed Grade 9 or have left school and want to achieve a Grade 9 competency level equivalent to the Certificate of General Secondary Education Examination. Palestinian students at Grade 8 participated in TIMSS in 2003 and 2007. The score for mathematics test was 390 in 2003 and 367 in 2007. The score for science test was 435 in 2003 and 404 in 2007.

=== National curriculum ===
A unified curriculum was applied in both the West Bank and the Gaza after using curriculum from other nations for a long time. The implementation phase of the national curriculum began by implementing national textbooks in all subjects in 2000. The textbooks were first implemented in Grade 1 and Grade 6, followed by textbooks for Grade 2 and Grade 7 in 2001. By the beginning of the 2006–2007, all students in all grades were using the Palestinian national textbooks.

Schools

- American School of Palestine
- Al-Arkam school
- Rafah Elementary Co-Ed "B" School
- Ramallah Friends Schools

== Secondary education ==
Secondary education consists of two years, and includes an academic and a vocational program. (MOEHE 2005b) Students are able to select either of these programs, but their right to entry is based on successful completion of Grade 10 based on the results of their final assessments.

In secondary academic education in 2005/2006, a total 118,868 students were enrolled in schools. Among them, most students were enrolled in schools provided by the Palestinian Authority (114,790 students, 97 percent of total), and about 3 percent of the students were enrolled in private schools. UNRWA does not provide education at secondary level. Gross enrollment ratios for empowerment stage were 97.5% for total, 95.7% for male, and 99.5% for female students.

In secondary vocational education during the 2005/2006 school year, a total of 5,999 students were enrolled in schools. Among them, most students were enrolled in schools operated by the Palestinian Authority (5,653 students, 94 percent of total), and about 6 percent of the students were enrolled in private schools. Gross enrollment ratios for empowerment stage are 97.5% for total, 95.7% for male, and 99.5% for female students. Gross enrollment ratios for secondary education were 75.2% for total, 69.2% for male, and 81.6% for female students.

In the secondary education 2005/2006 school year, there were in total 3,734 classes, of which 185 classes (5 percent) were co-educational. While in the West Bank the share of co-educational classes was 7.4 percent, in the Gaza Strip only 0.1 percent of the total classes were co-educational, in fact only one school.

Certificate of General Secondary Education Examination (Tawjihee) was issued for high school students in grade 12 to prepare them for admission to the universities.

== Higher education ==
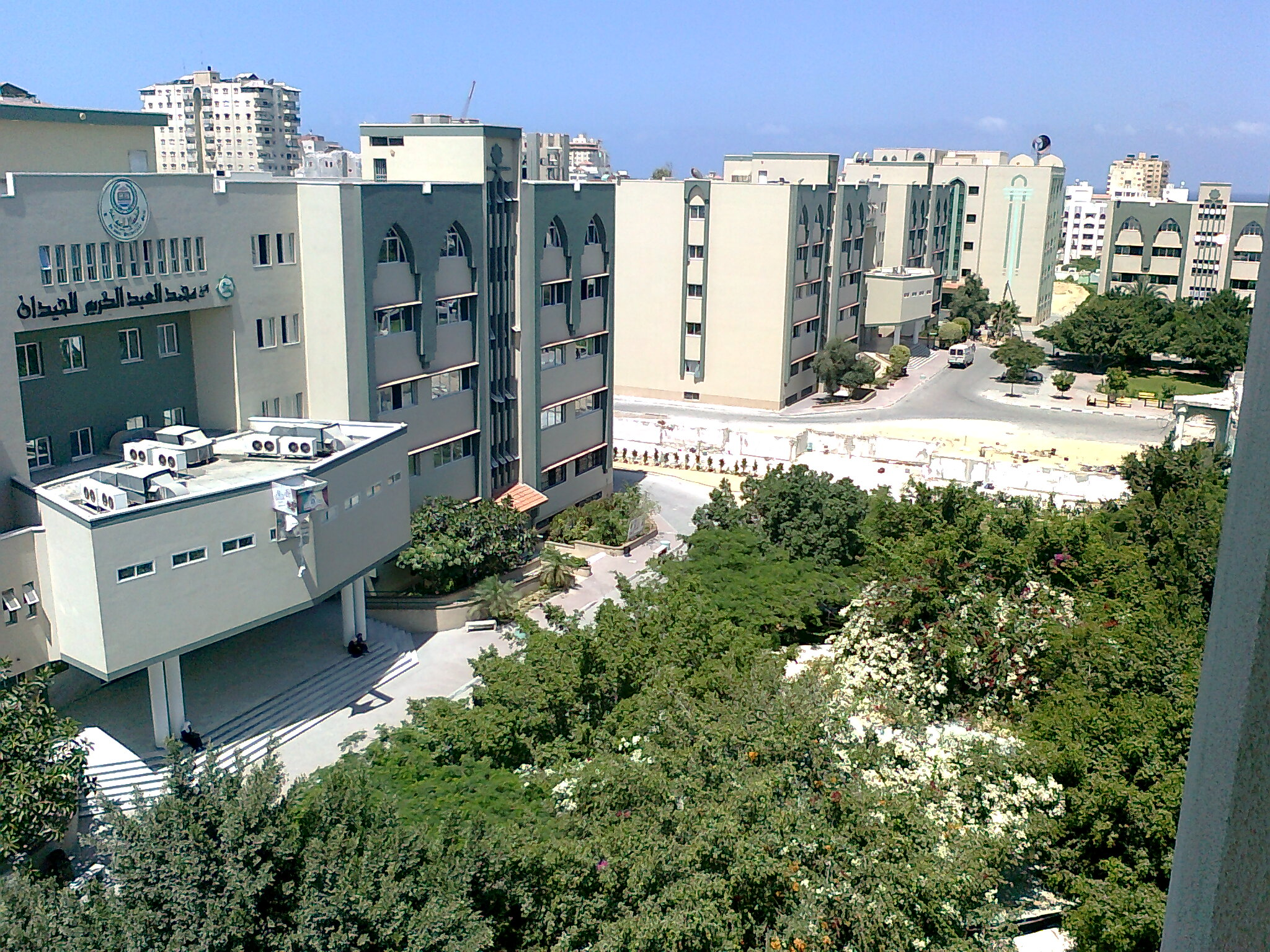
Islamic University of Gaza

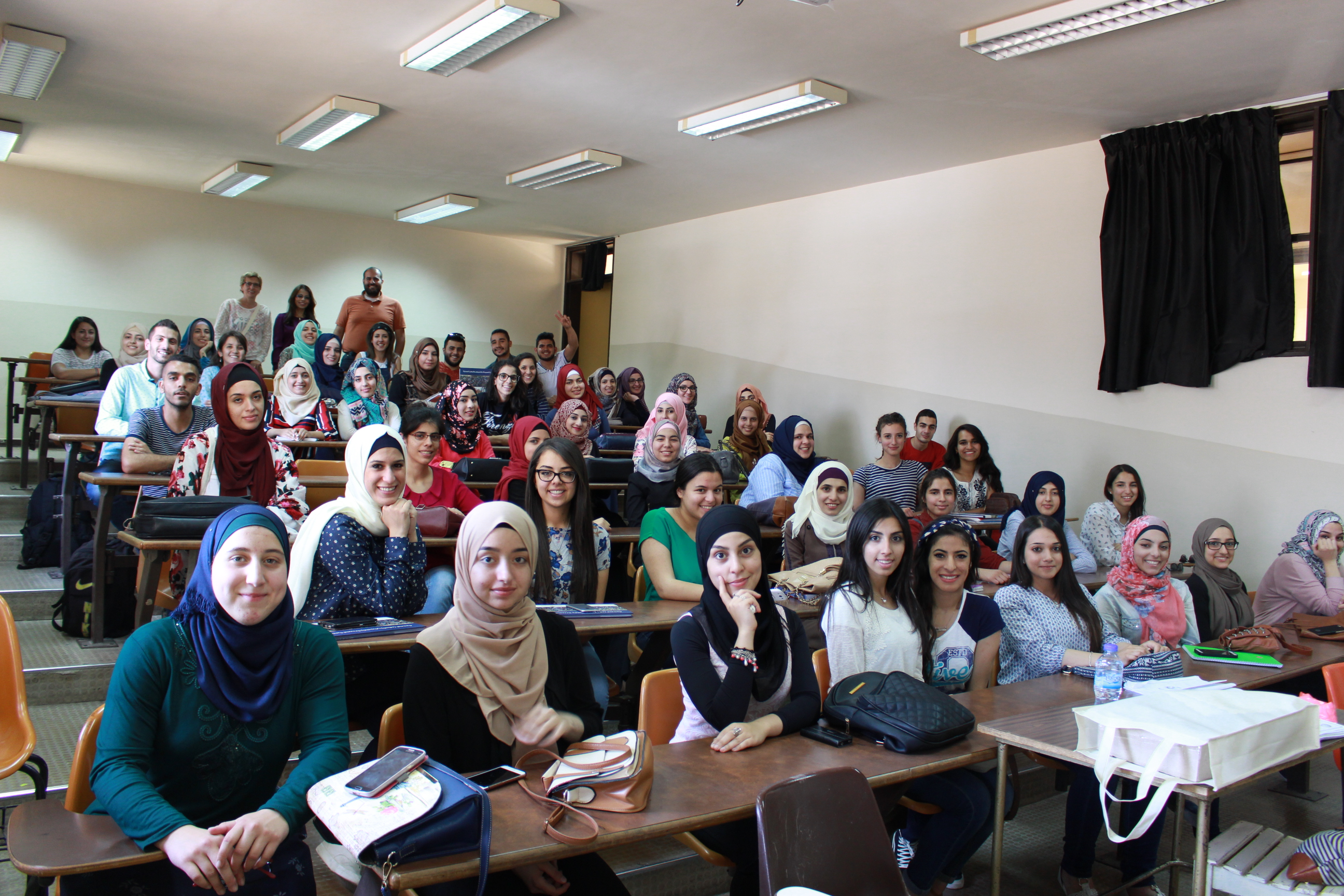
Palestinian students at Birzeit University in 2016

The university education consists of four years college education to obtain a bachelor's degree and additional two years for a master's degree. Some colleges provide two years of education for a diploma course. In 2005, Palestine had 10 universities, 1 distance education university (Al-Quds Open University), 13 university colleges, and 19 community colleges. The majority of the universities are non-profit institutions. They combine fund-raising with funding received from the Palestinian Authority.

In Higher Education Institutions, 138,139 students were enrolled during the 2004/2005 academic year. Among them, 76,650 students (55% of total) were enrolled in universities, 46,453 students (34%) are enrolled in the distance education university, 6,034 students (4%) were enrolled in university colleges, and 9,002 students (7%) were enrolled in the community colleges. The male students share is greater than that of female students in the universities, open university and university colleges. On the other hand, the share of female students is greater in the community colleges.(MOEHE 2005a) Gross enrollment ratios for higher education were 46.2% for total, 41.6% for male, and 50.9% for female students in 2007.

More students enrolled in certain academic programs such as social science, education, and humanities and arts in higher education, and the share of science and engineering is proportionately less.

Demand for tertiary education has increased significantly in the past decade with students enrolled in tertiary education institutions more than tripling between 1995 and 2006. Some academics have suggested that Palestinian Authority higher education system needs to not only satisfy the increasing demand from the growing population of secondary education graduates, but also to maintain quality and relevance to meet the changing demands of the global economy. In addition, public financing for tertiary education is considered insufficient given Palestinian Authority financial circumstances. The system heavily depends on student fees, which represent 60% of universities' operating costs.

The MOEHE has developed a new student loan scheme for tertiary education. The objectives of this loan scheme are: 1) to create a sustainable resource that will assist students into the future, 2) to ensure that students understand their responsibility to share the cost of their education, 3) to provide a strong, streamlined repayment system that is easy and fair (repayments of loans must be collected from all students), and 4) to provide a collection mechanism that will ensure sustainability (a revolving fund).

UNESCO states that because of "isolation, [the Universities] have suffered in particular from the absence of research departments."

"Inter-university co-operation programmes are underway, such as TOKTEN, PEACE and MEDCAMPUS. They are supported by partners such as the European Union, UNESCO and the UNDP. The PEACE programme (Palestinian-European Academic Co-operation in Education) involves 23 Palestinian Authority and European universities. It has been particularly noteworthy for having allowed students and teachers from the West Bank and Gaza to be admitted to European faculties at a time when the university establishments of Gaza and the West Bank were closed. In a second phase, it is to provide for the dispatch of missions of volunteer academics, on sabbatical, from Europe, North America and the rest of the world to the West Bank and Gaza." "Palestinian students wishing to obtain a doctorate must study either in Israel, or overseas."

Starting in November 2017, around half of the foreign lecturers in Palestinian universities began to be informed that their residency visas would not be extended because they had been "living in the area for more than five years." In addition, their spouses were required to pay tens of thousands of shekels as guarantee that they would not work.

== Technical and vocational education and training ==
Formal vocational education starts after basic education and lasts two years. After graduation, students can join university colleges (diploma in 2 years or bachelor's degree in 4 years) or colleges (2 years). There are five streams in school-based vocational training: industrial, agricultural, commercial, hotel and home economics. Fifteen secondary industrial schools offer 17 specializations and 2,185 students are enrolled in 2004/05. All but three of these industrial schools are funded by government. Sixty four academic secondary schools offer commercial subjects and nearly 3,000 students are enrolled. The two hotel training schools are private. Total students enrollment for the five streams increased from around 3,000 in 1999/2000 to 5,561 in 2004/05. This is considerably lower than the MOEHE 2000–2005 target (9,000 students enrollment). This is partly because this type of training remains unpopular among most students and parents/guardians.

The demand for most vocational training is weak. A few community colleges with limited capacity of 200–300 students have high applicant-place ratio (especially for nursing and the UNRWA Gaza Training Centre). The rest of community colleges have only around one applicant-place ratio. Manual skilled occupations continue to have low status and only the least academically able students are expected to enroll at TVET institutions. The majority of colleges have low student-teacher ratios and high unit cost.

In addition to community colleges, the Ministry of Labor and Social Affairs provides other TVET opportunities. Twelve Rehabilitation Centers that target dropouts, slow learners are run by this Ministry. Total enrollments were around 850 in 2004/05 with 380 graduates. The Ministry of Ex-Detainees also offers TVET to around 1,000 students and most of them are males. Four hundred fifty students are enrolled in the National Institute of Information Technology. The ministry also handles TVET centres (enrollment: 6600 students, which offer curriculum in trade (2 years), technical/semi-professional (2 years) and certificate courses (1 –2 years). Besides, The UNRWA provides short-term courses (8–40 weeks).

== Research centers ==
- Applied Research Institute–Jerusalem
- Institute for Palestine Studies
- Palestinian Academic Society for the Study of International Affairs
- Palestine Land Society
- al-Shabaka
- Palestine Economic Policy Research Institute (MAS)

== Advanced Research ==
- Durham Palestine Educational Trust

== Education for Palestinian refugees ==
UNRWA has been the main provider of basic education to Palestinian refugee children since 1950. Basic education is available to all registered refugee children free of charge up to around the age of 15. By 31 December 2009, there were close to 482,000 students enrolled in 691 schools. UNRWA schools follow the curriculum of their host countries. This allows UNRWA pupils to progress to further education or employment holding locally recognised qualifications and fits with the sovereignty requirements of countries hosting refugees.

In the 1960s, UNRWA schools became the first in the region to achieve full gender equality. Overcrowded classrooms containing 40 or even 50 pupils are common. Almost all of UNRWA's schools operate on a double shift – where two separate groups of pupils and teachers share the same buildings. Not all refugee children attend UNRWA schools. In Jordan and Syria children have full access to government schools and many attend those because they are close to where they live. UNRWA also operates eight vocational and technical training centres and three teacher training colleges that have places for around 6,200 students.

== Gaza war ==
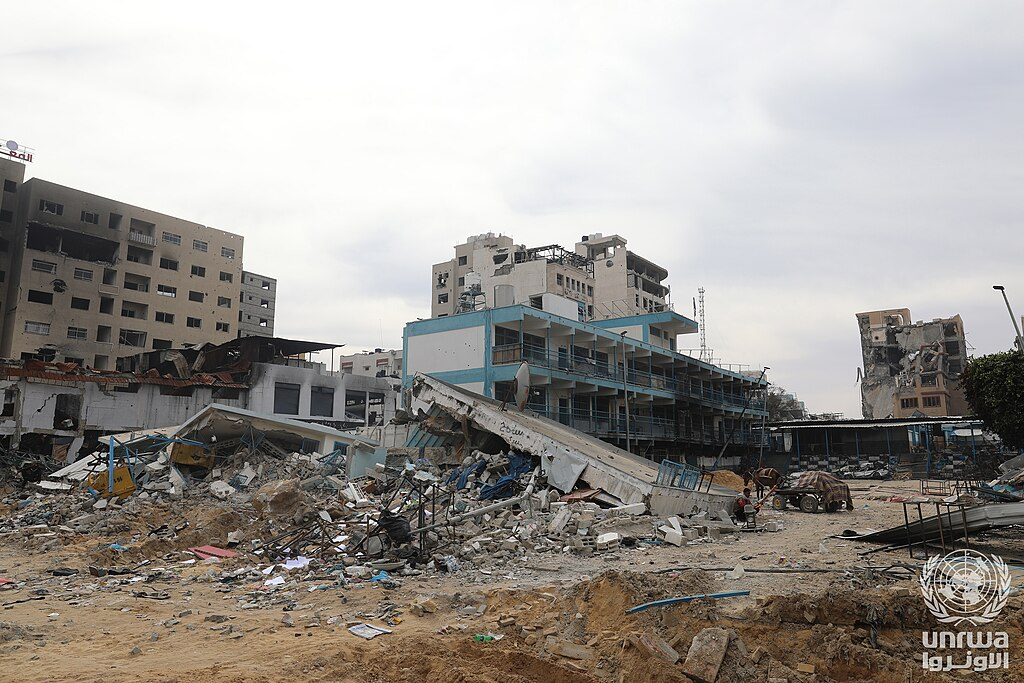
A destroyed UNRWA school in Zaytun in February 2024

Before the war, education in the Gaza Strip was seen as a point of pride and a high priority. More than 95% of the children aged between 6-12 were attending school, with the majority graduating from high school. In December 2023, Jonathan Crick, a spokesperson for UNICEF in Jerusalem stated that there is absolutely no form of education or schooling in the Gaza Strip, and the about 625,000 school age children in the Strip are being deprived of an education due to war. In January 2024, the United Nations reported that children in Gaza would lose at least one year of education due to the war. According to the Palestinian Ministry of Education, the war has caused the death of about 4,327 students and injured about 7, 819 others by January 2024. Additionally at least 200 teachers have been killed and more than 500 injured by December 2023 with the number increasing to 231 teachers and administrators killed and 756 wounded by January 2024.

Schools were closed at the start of the war, and underwent sustained bombing by the Israeli military, while others, such as the Israa University, were occupied and then destroyed by the Israeli military. By mid-December 2023 about 352 school buildings had been damaged, which is over 70% of the Strip's education infrastructure, with others being utilized to hold evacuated individuals and interiors utilized for fuel and survival. Some teachers attempted to continue lessons as they could, in courtyards and other areas not utilized by evacuated populations, with one teacher calling it an act of defiance and a small return to normal. On 22 February, however, a Save the Children representative stated, "Even if the war were to end tomorrow, education can not just resume. More than half of Gaza's schools have either been destroyed or are too damaged to even function". In August 2024, UNRWA launched a "back to learning programme" in Khan Younis.

In August 2024, the Education Cluster, Save the Children, and UNICEF stated that students and children in Gaza had lost a year of education and warned that the "majority of them may never return to school again". Some students enrolled in online classes or learned in tent classrooms.

As of January 2025, children in Gaza had been without formal schooling for over a year. While some informal classes reportedly take place in displacement camps, parents say their children are falling behind academically, forgetting basic literacy skills, or losing crucial years of education altogether.
Since the outbreak of the Gaza war on 7 October 2023, the Israel Defense Forces (IDF) has conducted attacks (including numerous airstrikes) on more than 200 educational facilities, including universities, in the Gaza Strip.

== Criticism ==
In 2022, the European Parliament's Budgetary Control Committee condemned the Palestinian Authority (PA) for allegedly using European Union (EU) funds to create school books containing violent and hateful content. The committee based its decisions on a 2021 report by the Israeli non-profit IMPACT-SE, which listed references throughout all grades and subjects to antisemitic content and imagery, hate speech, and incitement to violence, martyrdom, and jihad. According to the Georg Eckert Institute, Palestinian textbooks display antisemitic narratives and glorify violence.

== See also ==
- Attacks on schools during the Israeli invasion of Gaza
- List of countries by literacy rate
- Textbooks in the Israeli–Palestinian conflict
- UNRWA
