= Order of Bethlehem =

Palestinian Order

Awarded by President of the State of Palestine
- Type: Order of merit with 2 degrees
- Established: 2000
- Awarded for: Presidents, Kings, Clergy and Politicians
- Status: Currently constituted
- President: Mahmoud Abbas
- Grades: • Grand Collar of Bethlehem; • Star of Bethlehem
- Ribbon of Order of Bethlehem

Order of Bethlehem Is one of the orders of the State of Palestine.

== Grades ==
- The Grand Collar of Bethlehem: is the highest level in this Order, it is given to presidents, kings and high-ranking clerics.
- The Star of Bethlehem: is a distinctive level in this Order, and it is given to ministers, ambassadors and politicians, Palestinians and foreigners.

== Recipients ==
=== The Grand Collar of Bethlehem ===
- Patriarch Kirill of Moscow (2012).

== See also ==
- Orders, decorations, and medals of the State of Palestine
- Grand Collar of the State of Palestine
