= Arab American University =

Private university in Jenin, West Bank, Palestine

Coordinates: 32.4066°N 35.3433°E

- الجامعة العربية الأمريكية
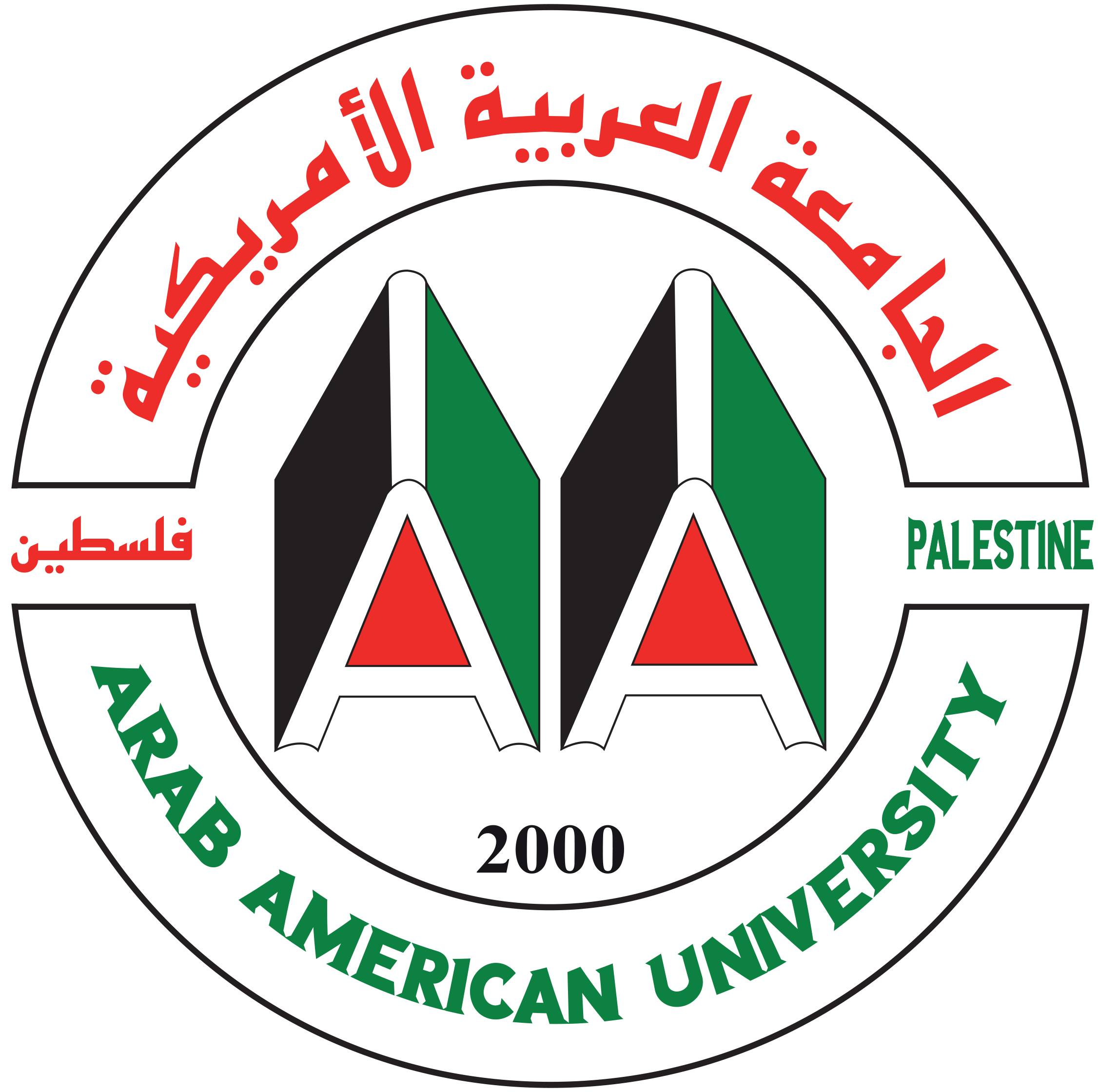
- Established: 2000
- President: Bara Asfour
- Academic staff: 465
- Administrative staff: 423
- Students: 10,995
- Location: Talfit, West Bank, Palestine
- Website: aaup.edu
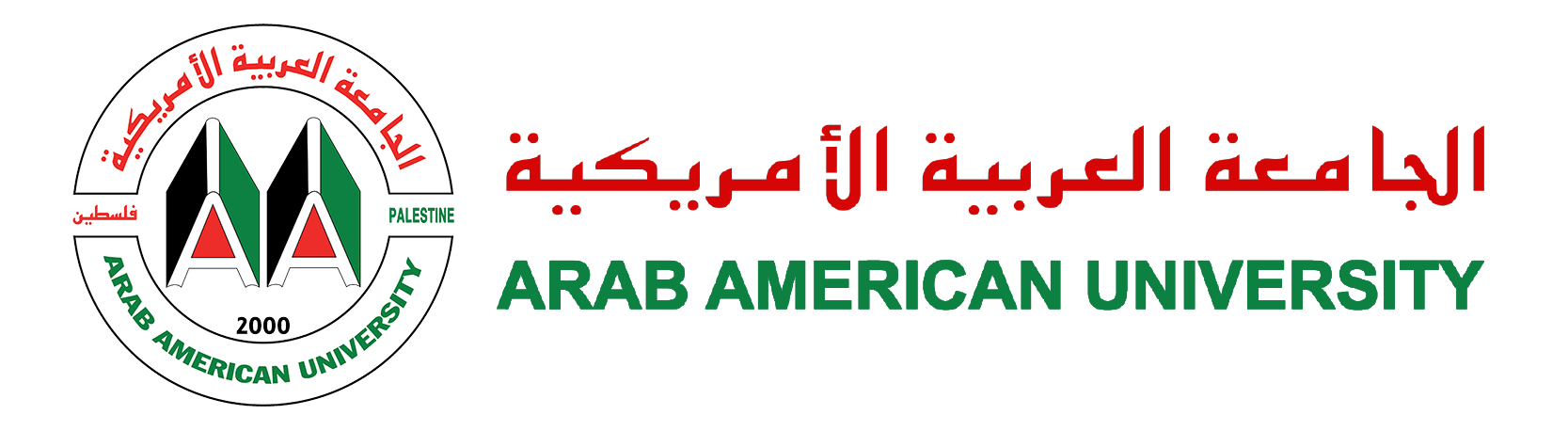

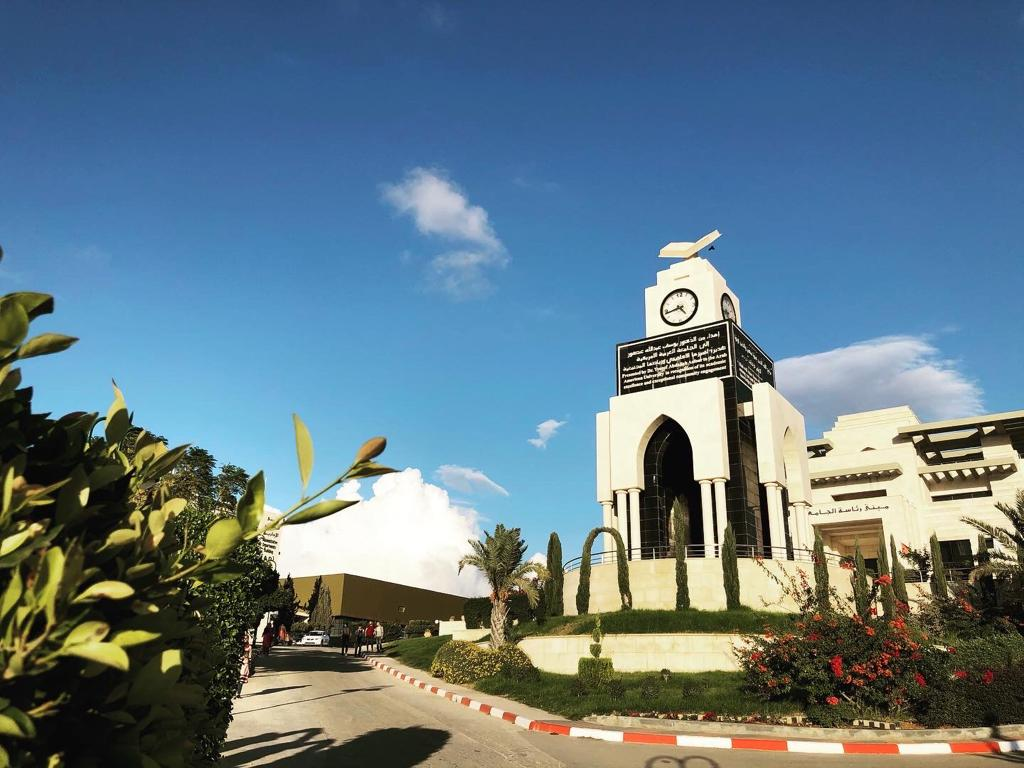
Presidency Building and the Faculty of Sport Sciences road

The Arab American University (Arabic: الجامعة العربية الأمريكية, romanized: Al-Jāmiʻah al-ʻArabīyah al-Amrīkīyah) or AAUP is the first private university in Palestine founded in 2000.

AAUP's main campus is located near Talfit in the south of the Jenin Governorate. It has another campus at Al-Reehan in the Ramallah and al-Bireh Governorate.

== History ==
In 1996, the idea of establishing a university in the West Bank was raised by a group of Palestinian businessmen. Among them was Dr. Yousef Asfour, who is the current head of the Board of Directors. Jenin Governorate, one of the 16 Governorates of Palestine, was chosen as the location of the main campus to address the lack of an institution of higher education in the region and its proximity to Arab cities and villages on the Green Line.

The Arab American University was established on September 28, 2000, with four initial faculties: the Faculty of Dentistry, the Faculty of Sciences, the Faculty of Allied Medical Sciences, and the Faculty of Administrative and Financial Sciences.

The university launched its academic programs in collaboration with California State University (CSU) in Stanislaus, which helped with the curriculum, and Utah State University (USU) in Logan, which supplied faculty and staff during the initial years. In 2017, AAUP opened its second campus in Al-Reehan, Ramallah and Al-Bireh governorate. Today, it offers more than 40 programs across BA, high diploma, MA, and PhD levels.

== Faculties ==
=== Faculty of Administrative and Financial Sciences ===
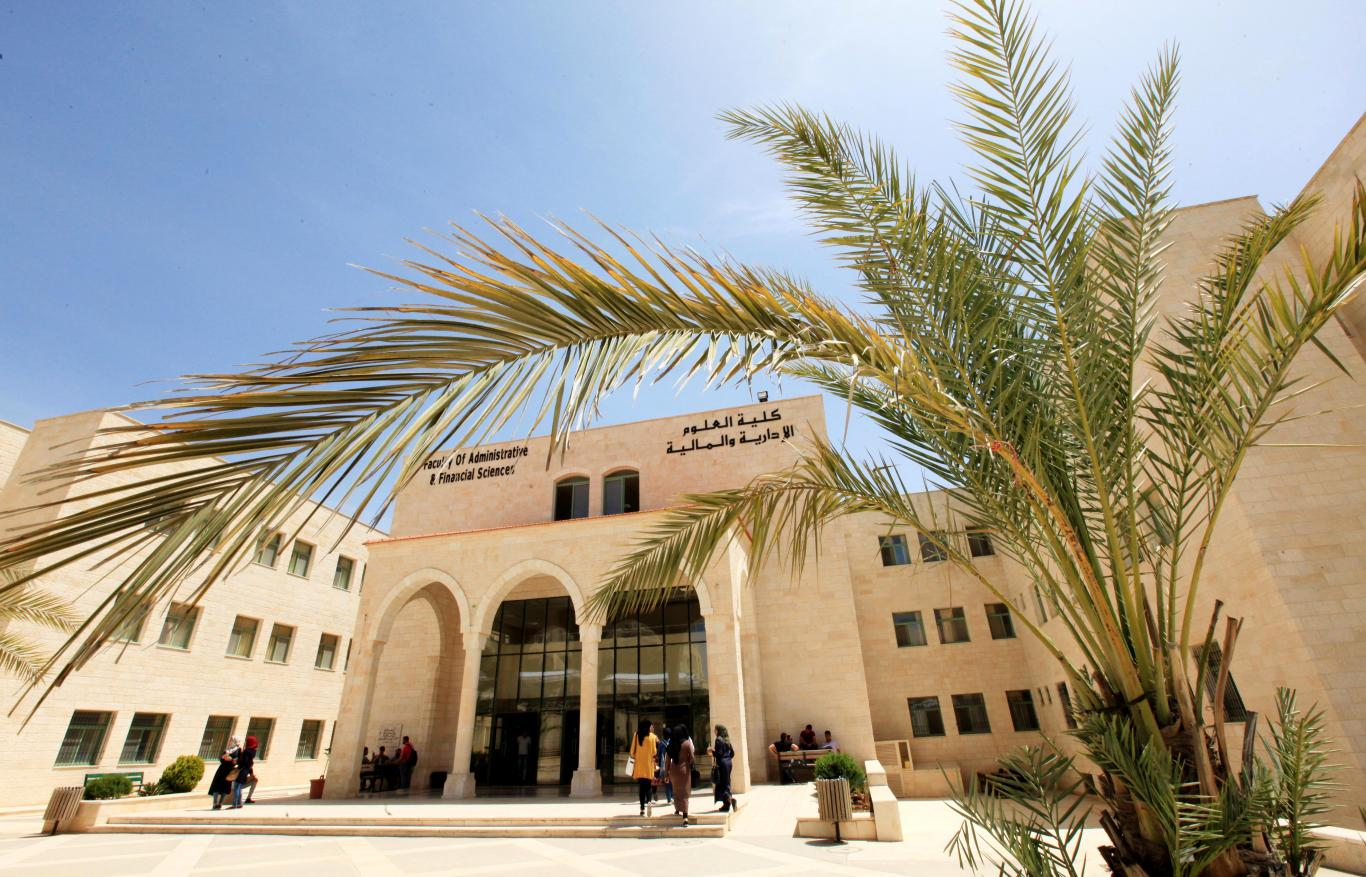
Faculty of Administrative and Financial Sciences

The Faculty of Administrative and Financial Sciences provides the BA programs in: Accounting, Business Administration, Human Resources Management, Financial and Banking Sciences, Marketing, Hospitality and Health Care Management, Management Information System (MIS), Finance and Data Science, and Economics and Islamic Banking.

=== Faculty of Allied Medical Sciences ===
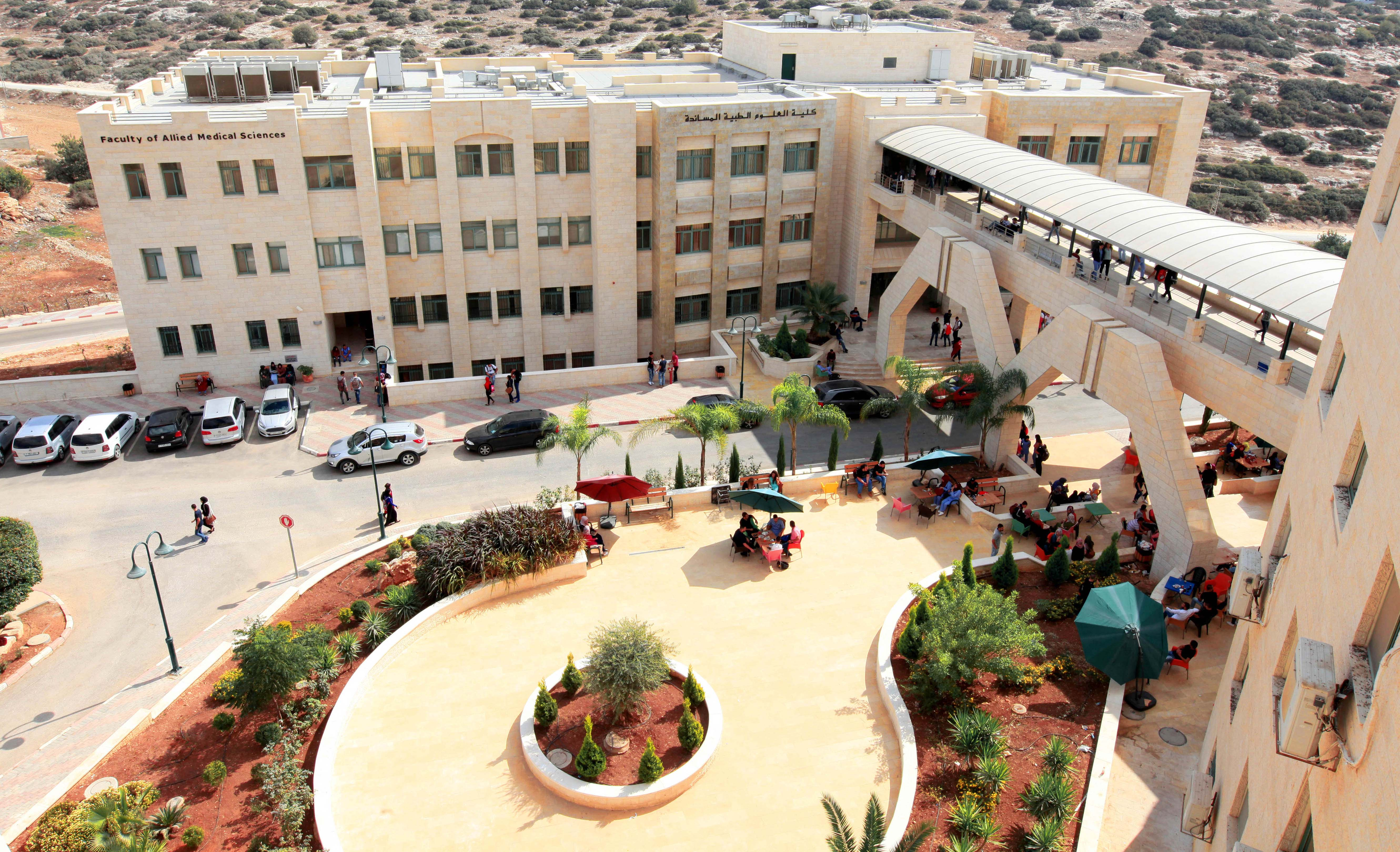
Faculty of Allied Medical Sciences

The Faculty of Allied Medical Sciences offers BA programs related to medical professionals and medical technology, such as: Prosthetics and Orthotics, Physiotherapy, Occupational Therapy, Medical Laboratory Sciences, Environmental Sciences and Technology, Medical Imaging, Pharmacy, and Speech, Language, and Hearing Disorders.

=== Faculty of Arts and Education ===
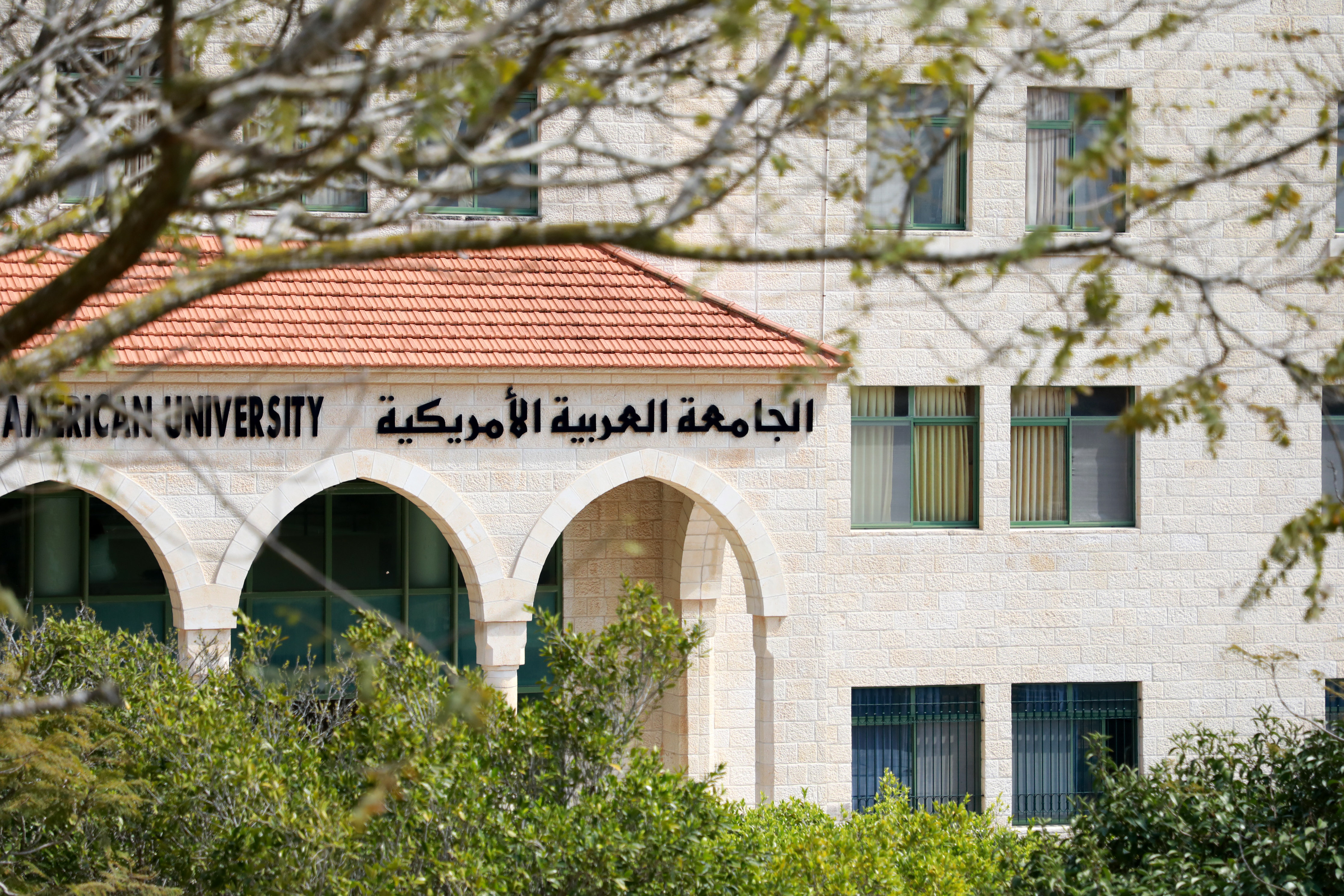
Faculty of Arts

The Faculty of Arts and Education offers BA degree programs in Arabic Language and Media, Basic Elementary Education, and English Language. The faculty also offers diploma degrees in education like: Diploma in Education for Upper Basic Level – Teaching English, Diploma in Education for Upper Basic Level – Teaching Mathematics and Diploma in Education for Upper Basic Level – Teaching Arabic.

=== Faculty of Dentistry ===
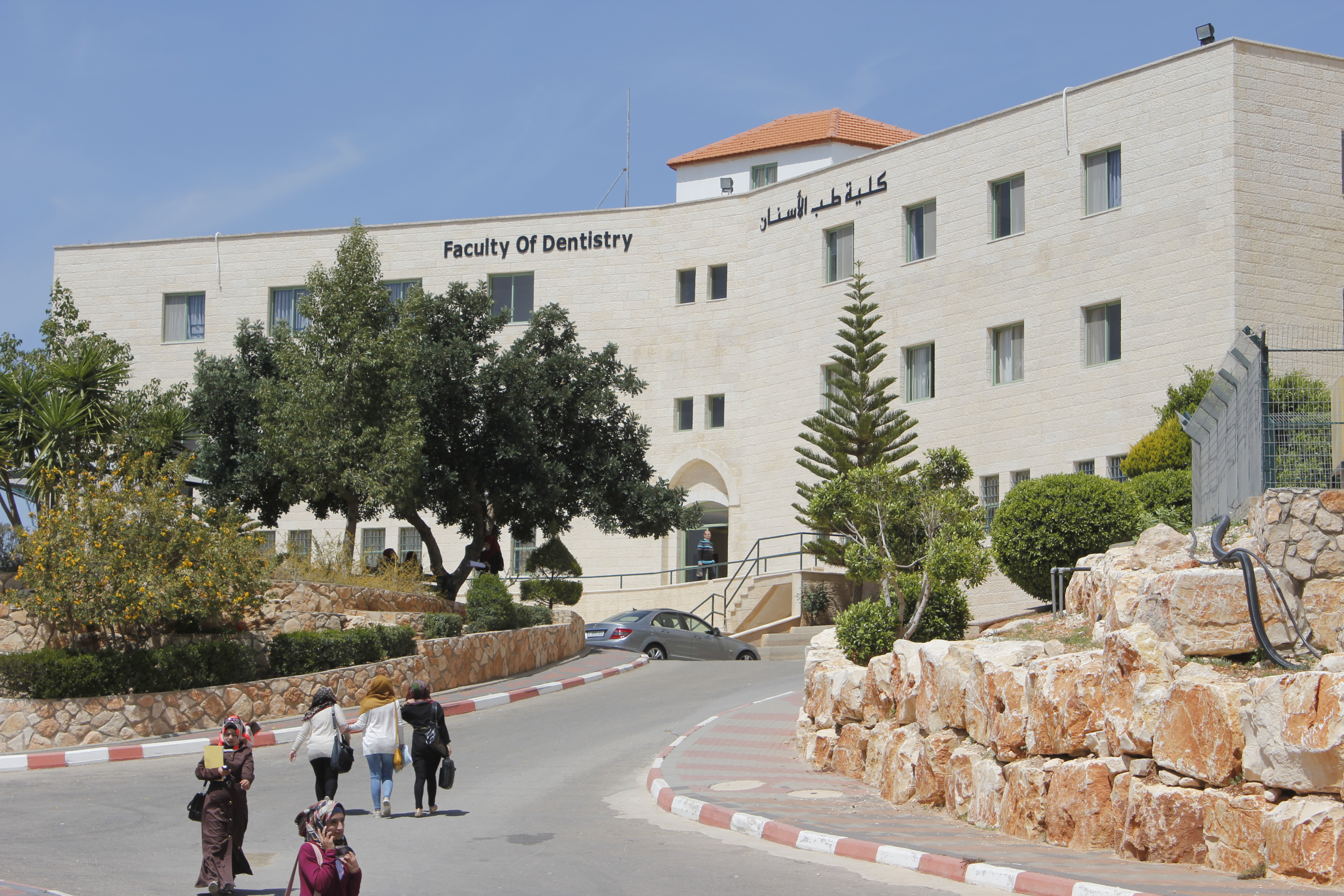
Faculty of Dentistry

The Faculty of Dentistry offers a BA in Dental Surgery and a diploma in Dental Technology.

=== Faculty of Engineering ===
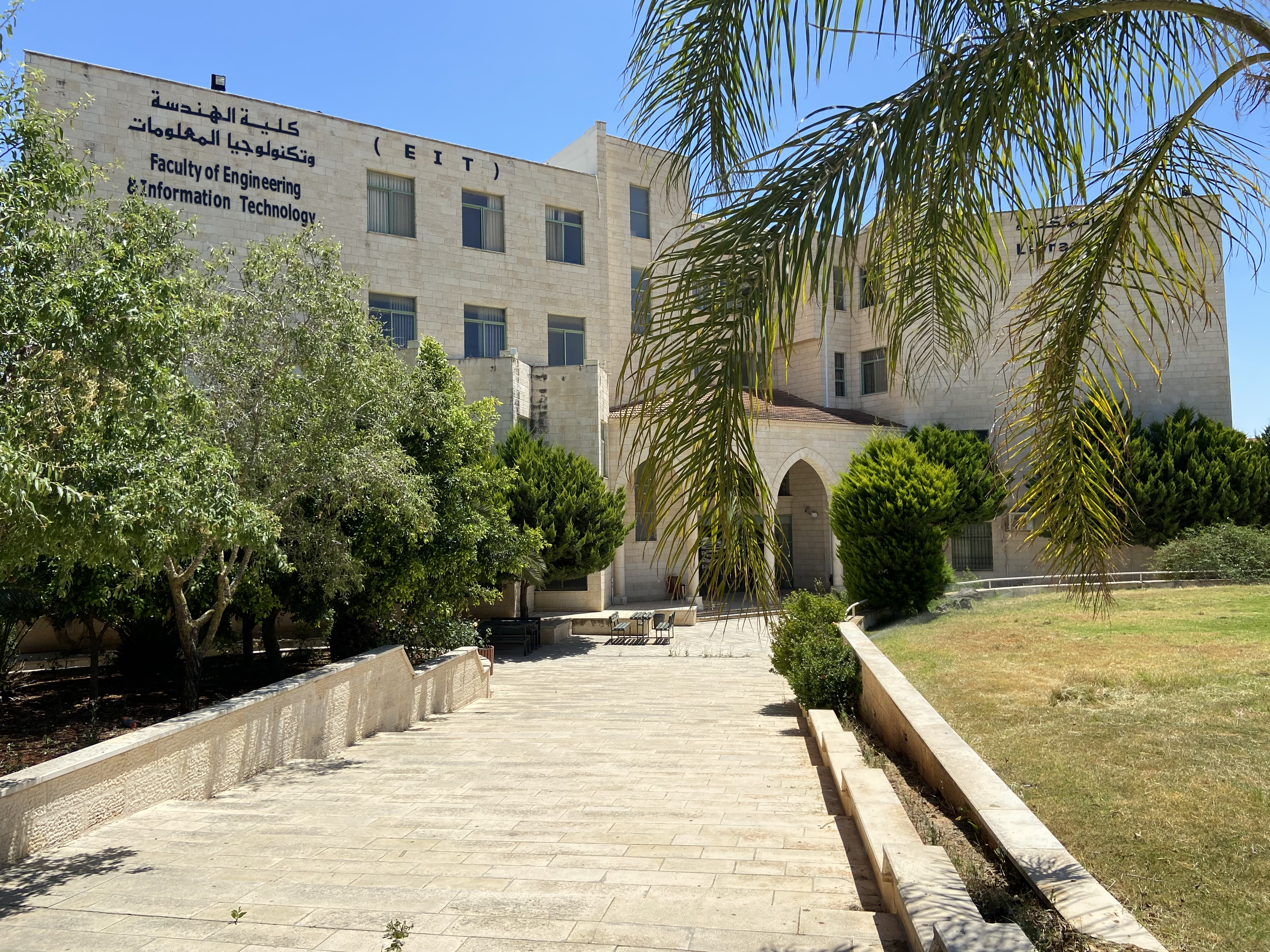
Faculty of Engineering and Information Technology

The Faculty has been quoted as offering "Bachelor of Science Engineering degrees in seven different disciplines namely, Computer Systems Engineering, Telecommunications Engineering, Electrical Engineering and Renewable Energy, Civil Engineering, Architectural Engineering, Medical Equipment Engineering, and Mechatronics Engineering. The first three programs have started during the last 15 years while the other programs started in 2021."

=== Faculty of Information Technology ===
The Faculty of Information Technology offers Bachelor's programs in the fields of Cyber Security, Computer Science, Geographic Information Systems (GIS) Multimedia Technology, and Computer Networks.

=== Faculty of Law ===
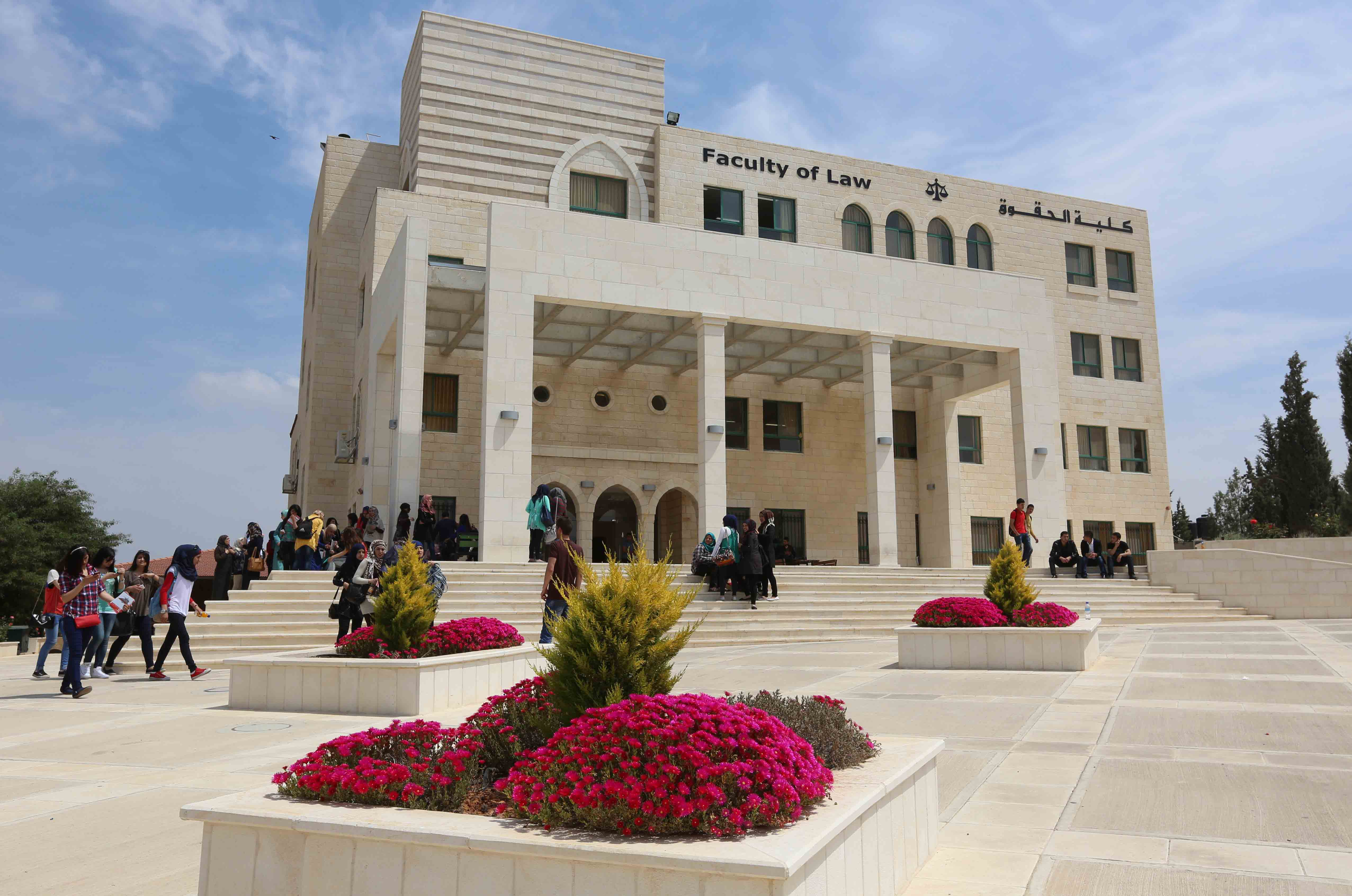
Faculty of Law

The Faculty of Law was established in AAUP in the beginning of the 2002/2003 academic year "in order to contribute, with its sisters law schools across the Palestinian universities, to prepare academically qualified and capable cadres in the field of law."

=== Faculty of Medicine ===
The Faculty of Medicine was established in 2020, and it offers a BA in Medicine.

=== Faculty of Modern Sciences ===
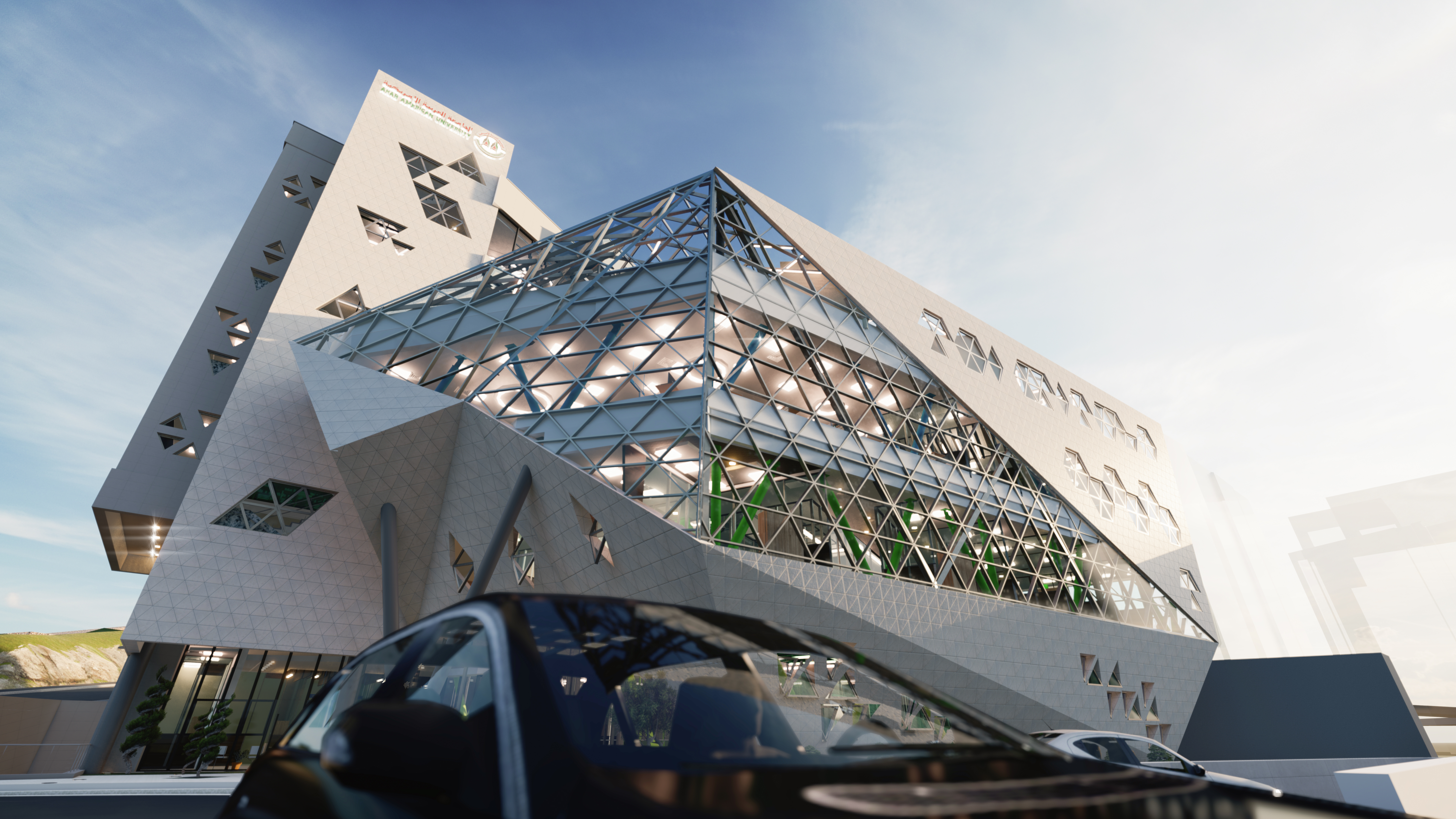
Faculty of Modern Sciences

This faculty offers programs such as Digital Marketing, Interior Architecture and Optometry.

=== Faculty of Modern Media ===
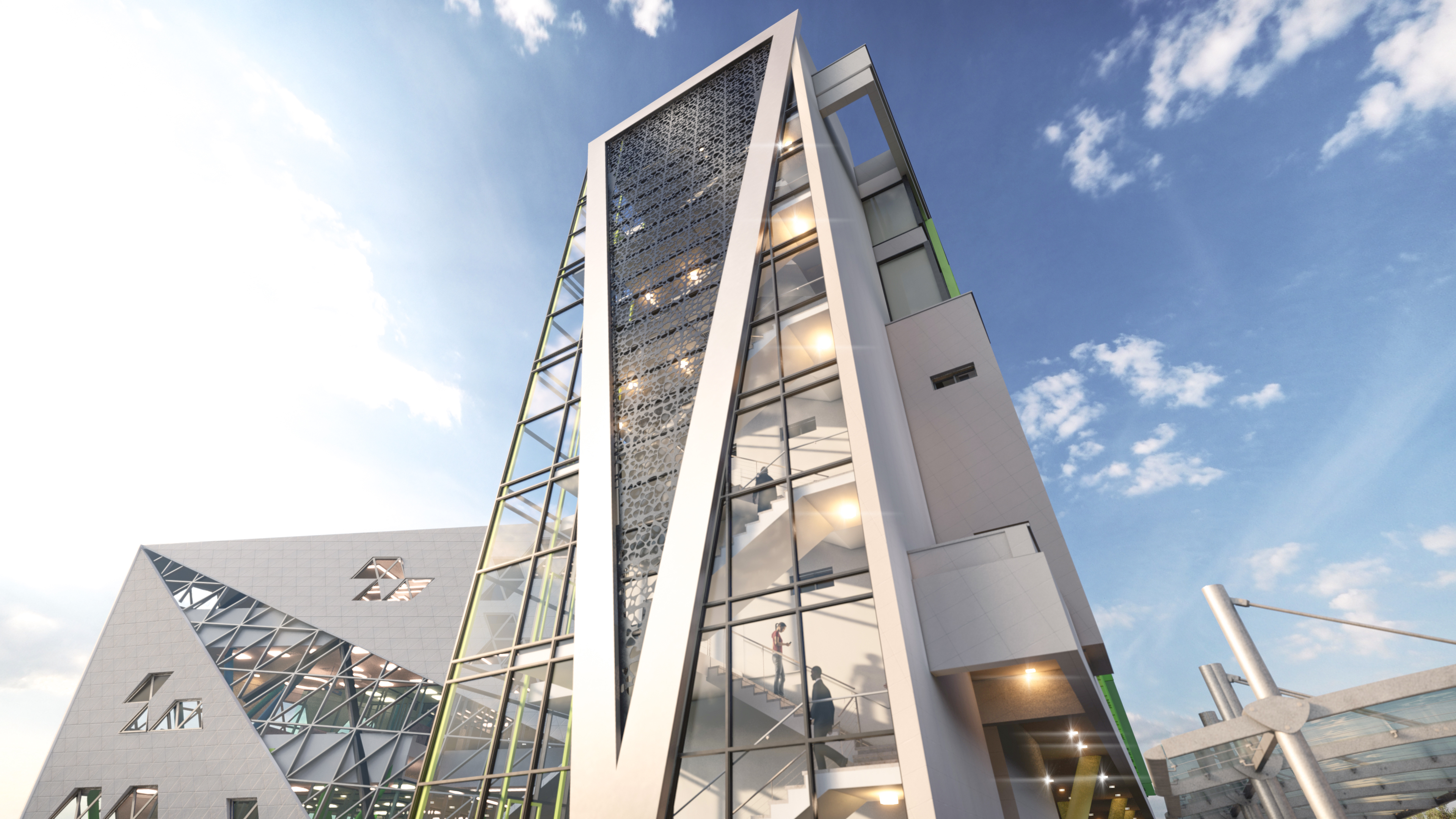
Faculty of Modern Media

The Faculty of Modern Media offers BA programs such as: Digital Media, Communication and Social Media, and Public Relations.

=== Faculty of Nursing ===
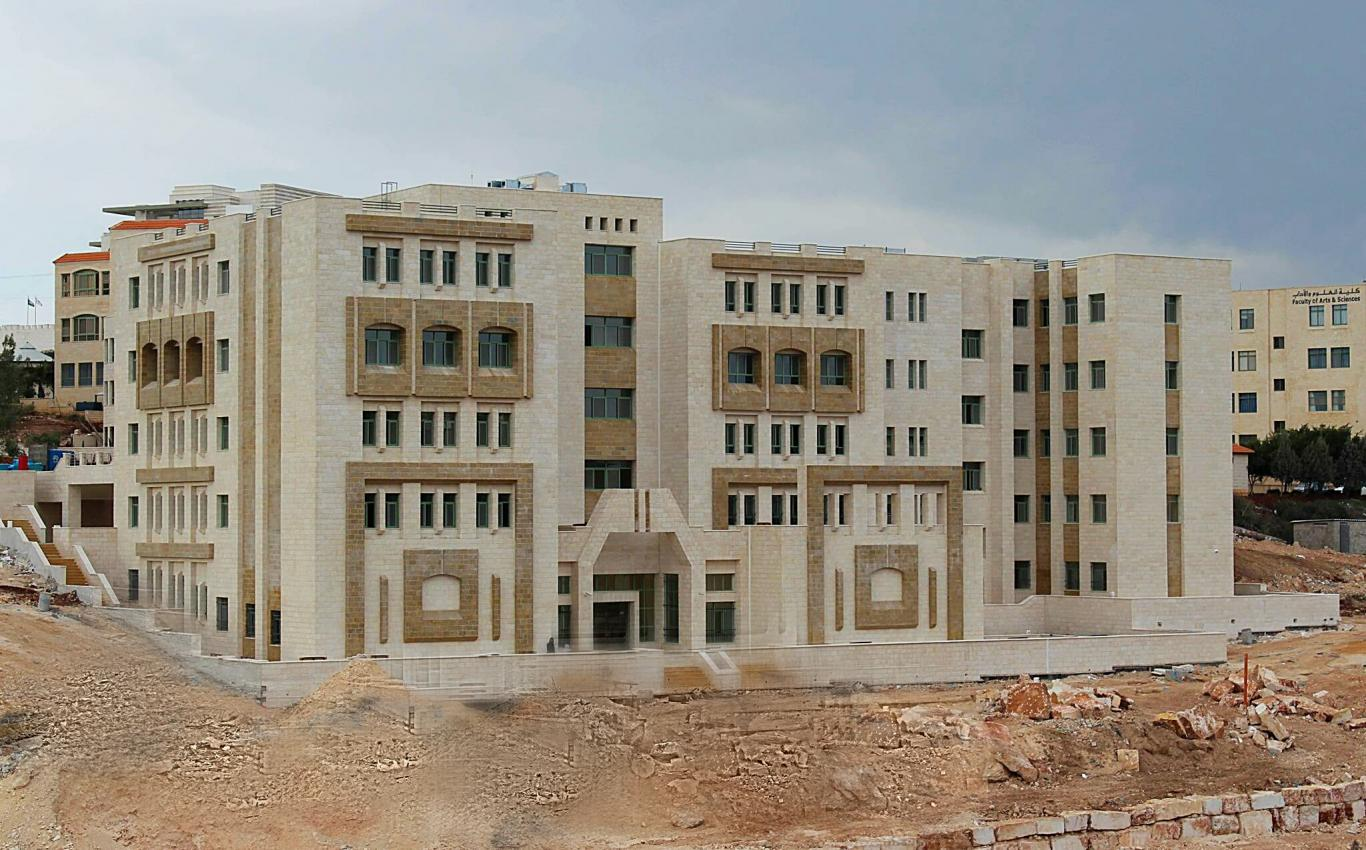
Faculty of Nursing

The Nursing Department was established in 2006 and it offers a BA in nursing. In 2016, the department was separated from the Faculty of Allied Medical Sciences and became an independent Faculty of Nursing.

=== Faculty of Sciences ===
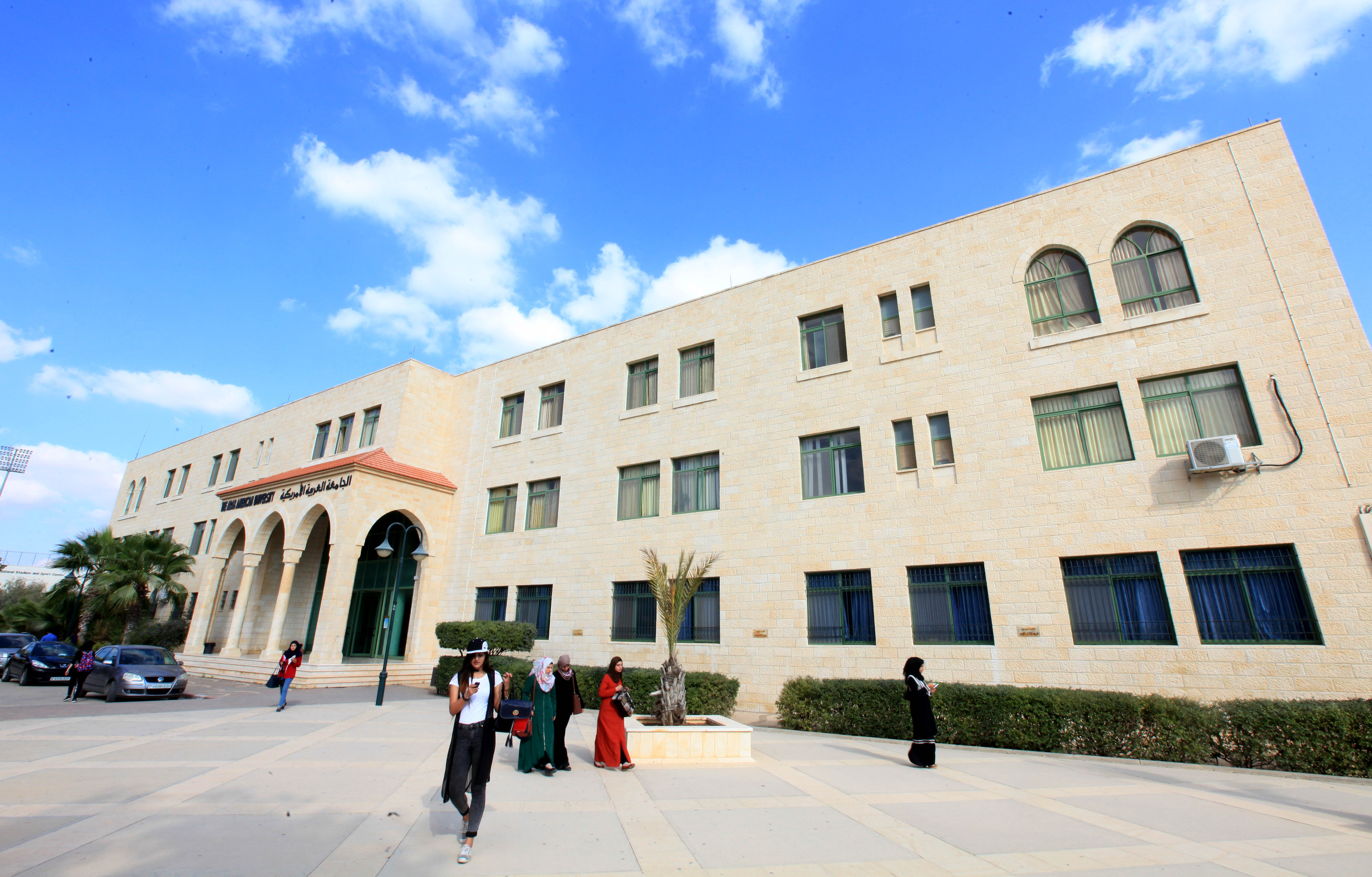
Faculty of Sciences

The Faculty of Sciences offers the following BA programs: Biology and Biotechnology, Chemistry, Mathematics and Statistics, Physics. These majors may be taken with a minor in education or computer science.

=== Faculty of Sport Sciences ===
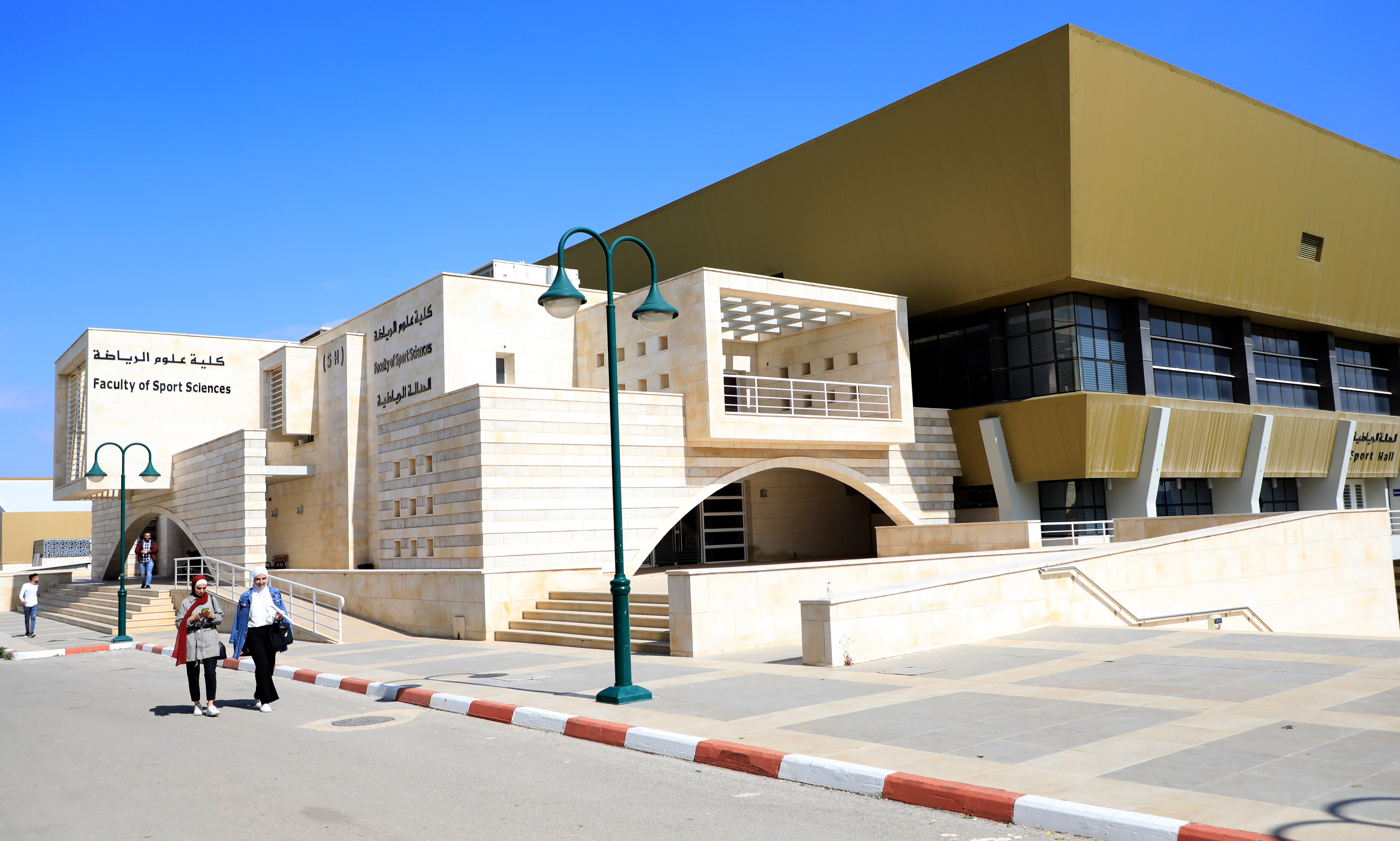
Faculty of Sport Sciences

AAUP has sports buildings and facilities that provide sport services to students, such as a half-Olympic swimming pool, a soccer stadium, sports halls, a gym, a basketball court, a volleyball court, a tennis court, handball court, squash court, and table tennis hall. The faculty offers a BA degree in sport sciences.

=== Faculty of Graduate Studies ===
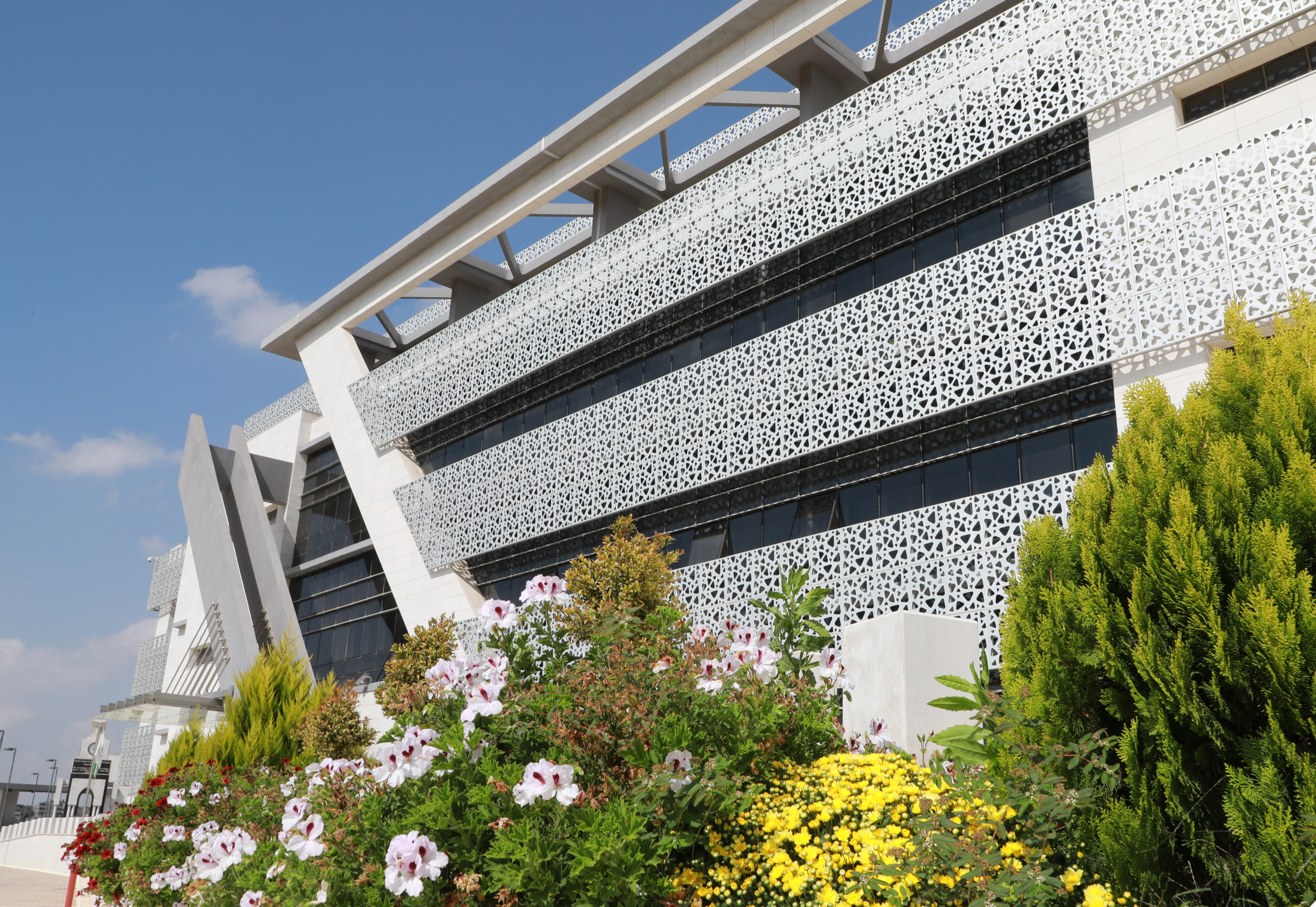
Faculty of Graduate Studies

AAUP provides MA, PhD and High Diploma graduate programs degrees in:

- Residency Program in Orthodontics, Advanced Residency in Prosthodontics and High Diplomas in Oral Implantology, Esthetic Dentistry and Endodontics.
- Masters in Business Administration, Human Resource Management, Quality Management, Intercultural Communication and Literature, Strategic Planning and Fundraising, Applied Mathematics, Contemporary Public Relations, Physics, Commercial Law, International Law and Diplomacy, Civil Law, Health Informatics, Molecular Genetics and Genetic Toxicology, Emergency Nursing, Ophthalmic Nursing, Conflict Resolution, Data Science and Business Analytics, Cybercrimes and Digital Evidence Analysis, Computer Science, Educational Psychology, Innovation in Education, Leadership, Accounting and Auditing, Intensive Care Nursing, Molecular Virology, Criminal Science and a Clinical Master in Periodontology and Implant Dentistry.
- PhDs in Business, Educational Administration, Physics, Information Technology Engineering, Educational Psychology, Special Education and Nursing.

== Scientific research ==
The Journal of Arab American University

It is a biannual international refereed scientific journal issued by the Deanship of Scientific Research at the Arab American University since 2014 in both English and Arabic. It accepts research papers in different fields of humanities and natural sciences.

Digital Repository

The Digital Repository in AAUP provides technical reports, conference papers, scientific articles, books, scientific studies, dissertations, scientific papers and research, projects and data collections.

Research Awards

AAUP Excellence Award for Scientific Research

This award was first awarded in the academic year 2016 / 2017 aiming to encourage researchers in the Palestinian universities to conduct scientific research.

The AAUP Excellence Award for Scientific Research, valued at USD 12,000, is presented annually to top research projects in Natural Sciences, Engineering and Technology, Medical and Health Sciences, or Social and Humanitarian Sciences.

Best Published Research Award in the Arab American University Research Journal

It is an annual award of $15,000 USD given to a selected published research in Arab American University Journal.

Engineer Zuhair Hijjawi Award

This annual award with an amount of $10,000 USD is given to the undergraduate students. The winners are selected for their research in one of the following fields: Information Technology, Engineering, Environment, Water and Renewable Energy Sciences and the Basic Sciences.

== AAUP centers ==
AAUP has various centers such as: The Center of Excellence for Climate Change and Environmental Technologies, the Dental Center in Main Campus, the Hydrotherapy and Physiotherapy Center, the Pediatric Rehabilitation Center, the Heart Center, the Simulation Laboratory, the Medical Center in Ramallah Campus, the Policy and Conflict Resolution Studies Center, the Language Center, the Continuing Education Center and Hassib Sabbagh Information Technology Center of Excellence.

== Sports buildings and facilities ==
The Half-Olympics Swimming Pool

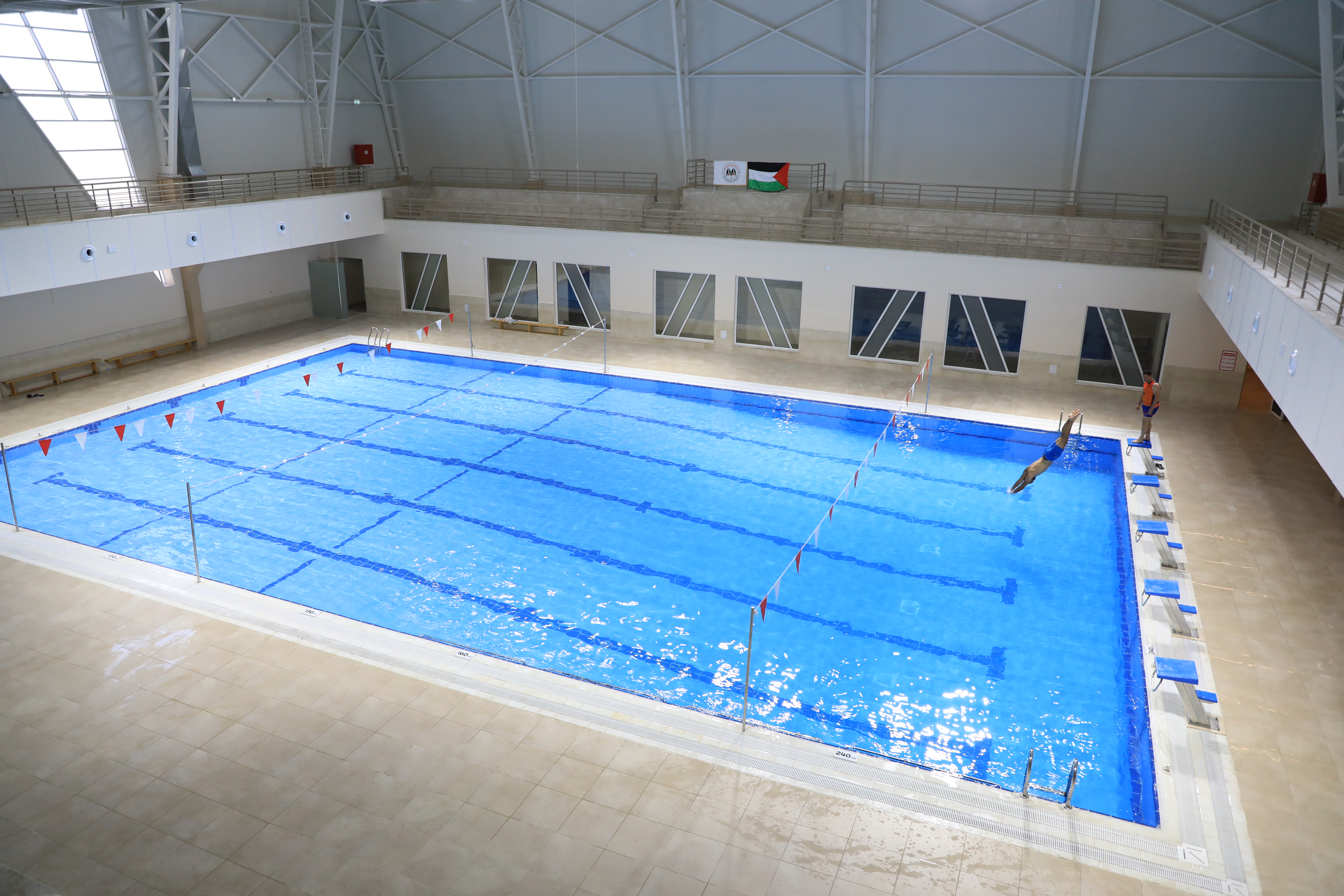
The Half-Olympics Swimming Pool

AAUP completed construction of a half-Olympic swimming pool, which serves both the Faculty of Sport Sciences and the local community, including university staff.

AAUP International Stadium

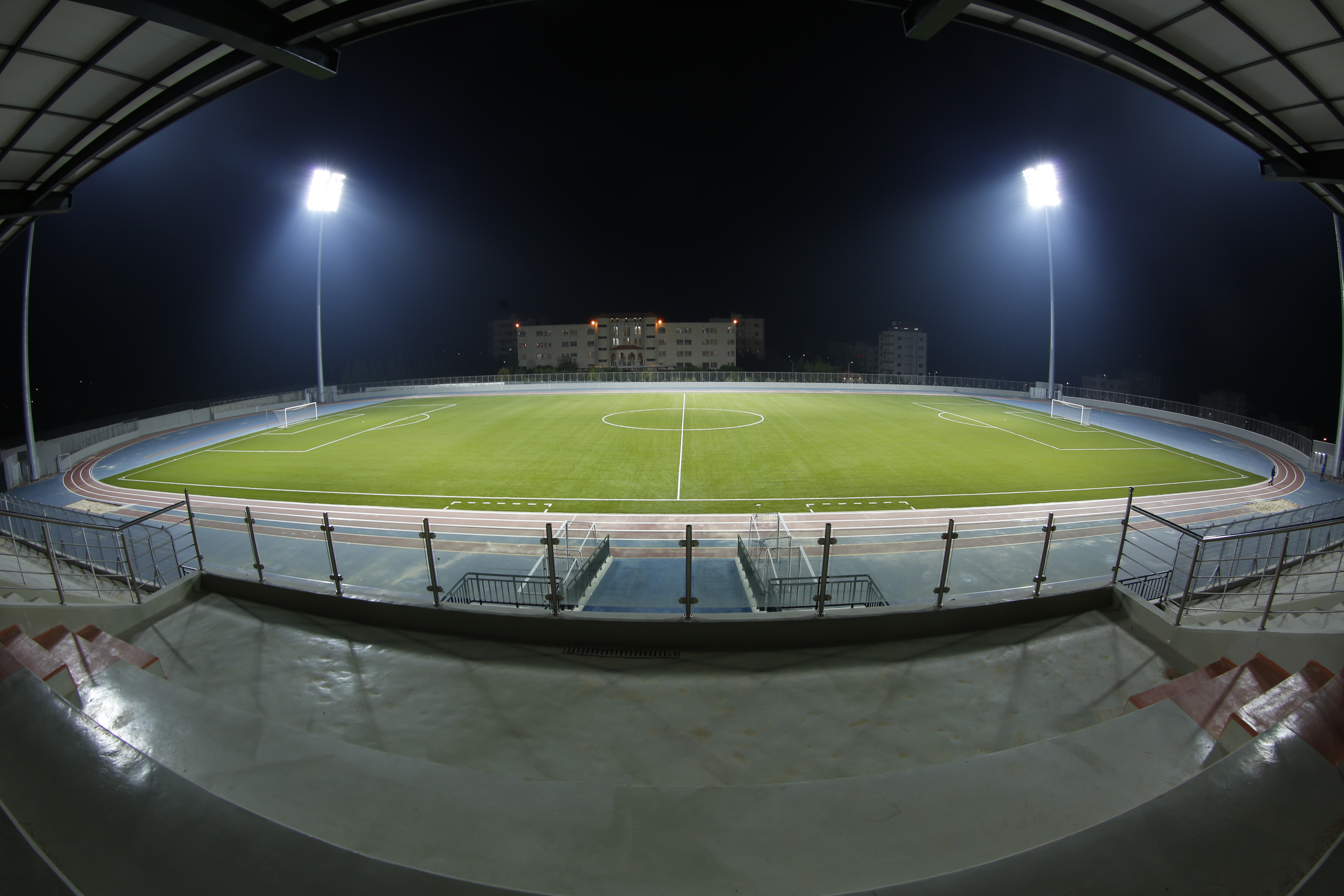
AAUP International Stadium

The stadium has hosted international soccer matches.

A Multi-Function Sport Hall

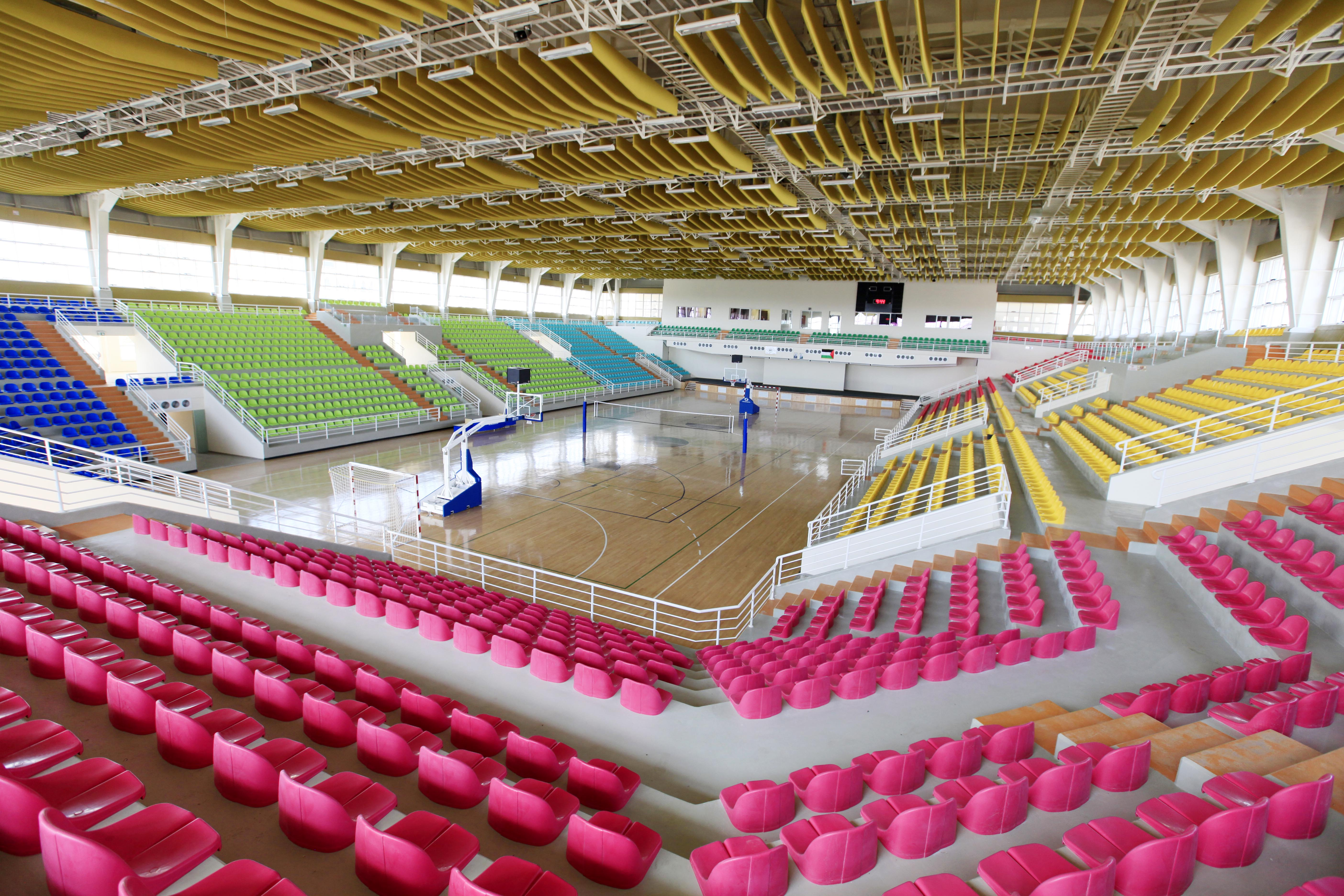
A Multi-Function Sport Hall

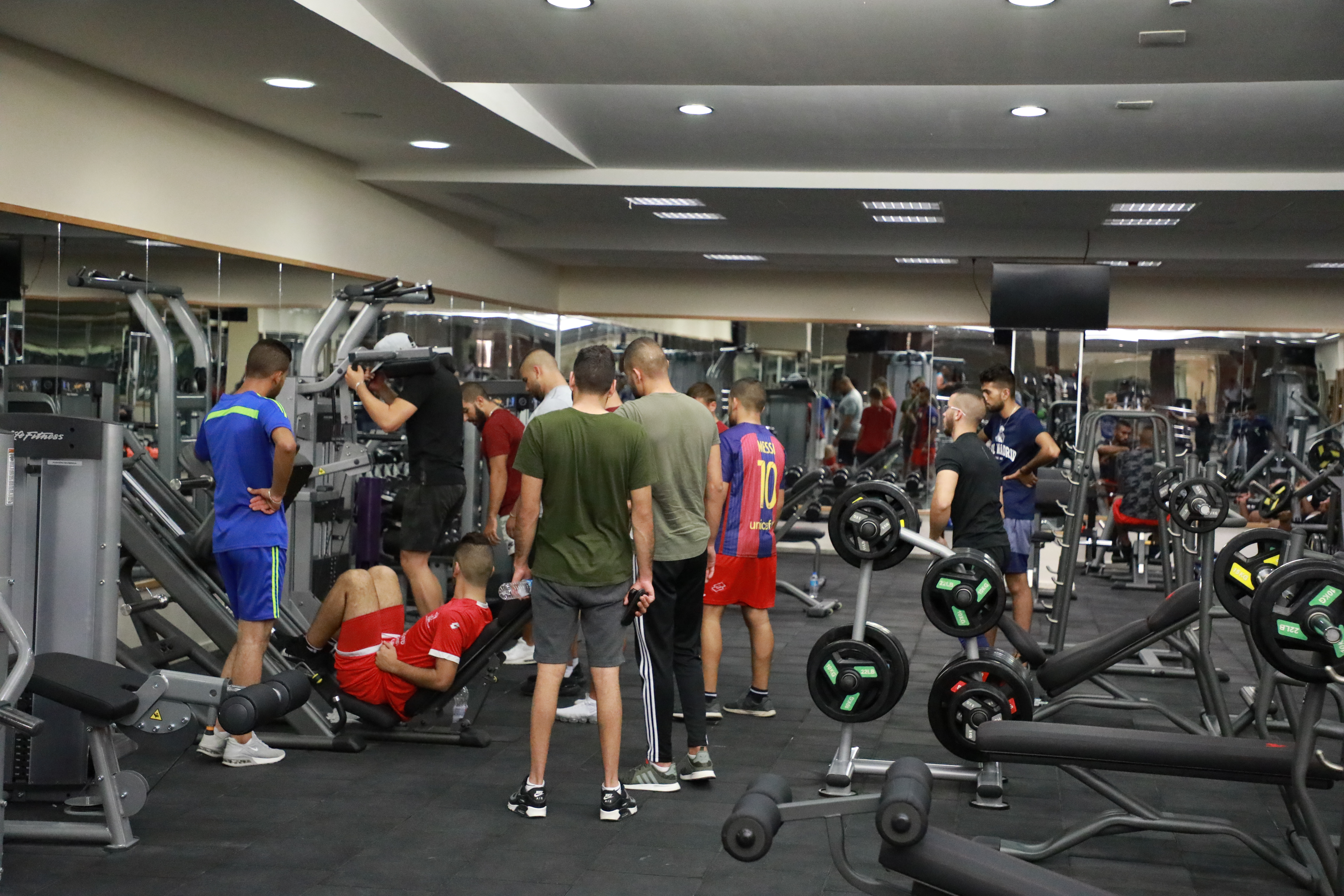
Gym and Fitness Center

It's a multi-function sport hall. It can accommodate over 5,000 people. It has a Five-a-side soccer field, handball court, volleyball court, badminton court, basketball court, a squash court, in addition to a judo hall, a gym hall, a fitness hall, and a table tennis hall.

Outside Sport Fields

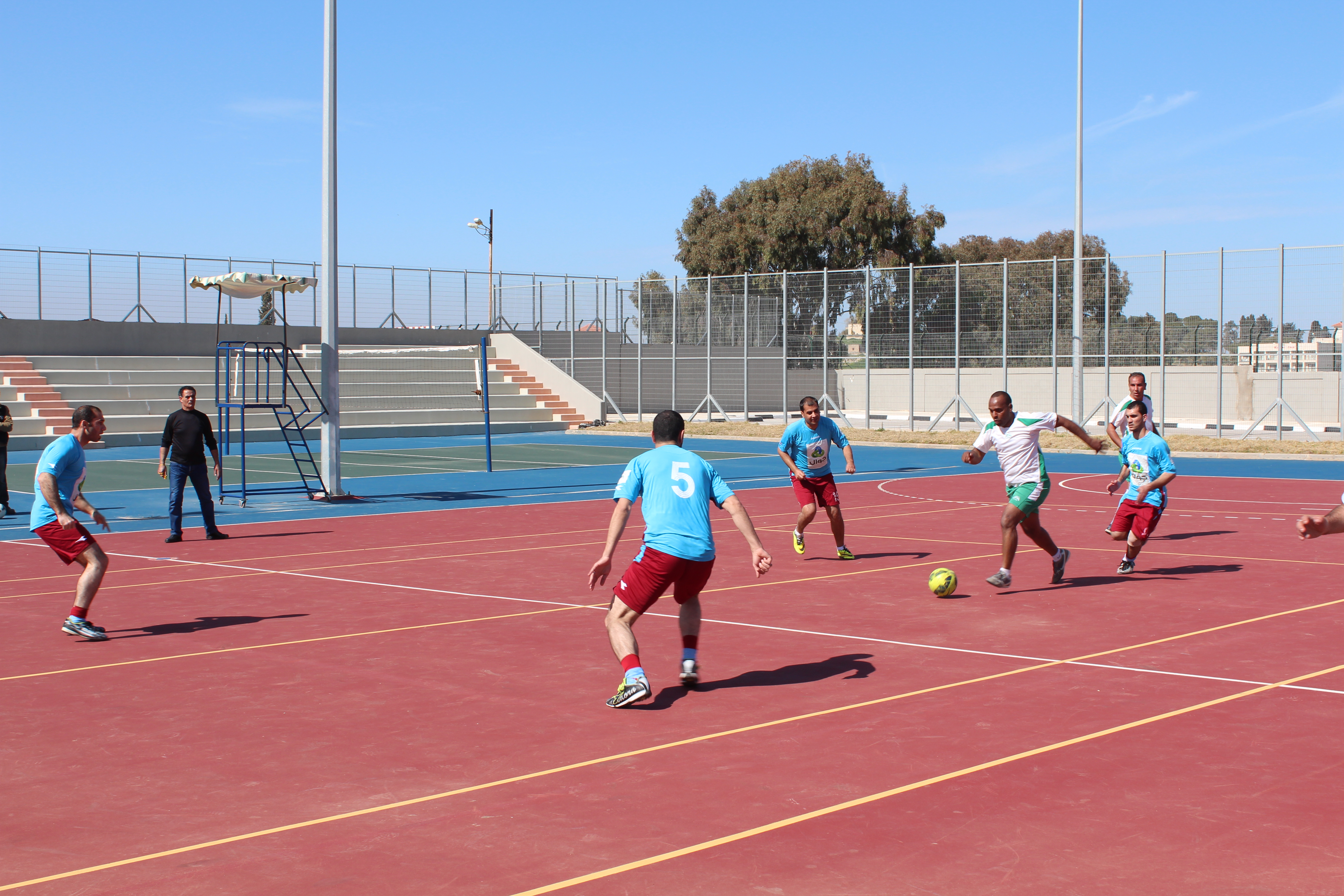
Outside Sport Fields

The outside sport fields include a five-a-side soccer field, basketball courts, handball courts, volleyball courts, tennis courts, badminton courts, and a stadium for over 2,500 people.

== AAUP presidents ==
The following individuals have served as presidents of AAUP:

- Waleed Deeb (1/9/2000 – 31/3/2005).
- Munther Salah (1/4/2005 – 31/3/2007).
- Adli Saleh (1/4/2007 – 31/8/2012).
- Mahmoud Abu Mwais (11/9/2012 – 31/8/2015).
- Ali Zedan Abu Zuhri (2015 – ).

=== Board of Trustees of Arab American University (Palestine) ===
- H.E. Dr. Majdi Khaldi – Chairman of the Board of Trustees
- H.E. Governor Dr. Laila Ghannam – Vice Chairman of the Board of Trustees
- Dr. Yousef Asfour
- Dr. Bara Asfour
- Eng. Zuhair Hijjawi
- H.E. Governor Kamal Abu Al-Rub
- Maj. Ibrahim Ramadan
- BG. Mansour Khuzaymiah
- Mr. Waleed Afifi
- Dr. Maysoon Ibrahim
- H.E. Minister Musa Abu Zaid
- Prof. Haitham Abu Al-Rub
- Eng. Emad Talhami
- Mr. Durgham Maree
- Dr. Farida Irshaid

== See also ==
- List of universities and colleges in Palestine
- Education in Palestine
- Maysoun Ibrahim
