= Yousef Asfour =

Palestinian businessman and philanthropist

- يوسف عصفور
- Born: Yousef Abdullah Mahmoud Asfour; 1955 (age 70–71); Sinjil, Palestine
- Occupations: Businessman; philanthropist
- Known for: Arab American University
- Spouse: Sabah Asfour
- Awards: Star of Merit from the Orders of the State of Palestine

Yousef Asfour (Arabic: يوسف عصفور; born 1955 - Sinjil, Palestine) is a Palestinian businessman, he founded and is currently the chairman of the board of directors of the Arab American University in Palestine.

== Early life ==
Asfour was born in 1955 in Sinjil, a village located in the Ramallah and al-Bireh Governorate. He was educated at the village's school and known as an outstanding student but, he discontinued his higher education due to his family's financial difficulties, and began to work at an early age to complete his higher education.

== Career ==
Asfour relocated to Saudi Arabia during the seventies to work in the field of customs clearance, within a short period of time began to work in trading and then work in the field of marble and granite, and ended up working as a construction contractor.

Asfour worked as an import and export agent for several companies before starting his own customs clearance firm in Saudi Arabia, in addition to his real estate work in Palestine at that time.

In 1996, Asfour co-founded the Arab American University, the first private university in Palestine. The university opened in 2000 and is located near Talfit in the south of Jenin Governorate. In 1997, he founded Geneva Company, for marble and granite in Palestine, Geneva Company's capital estimated at about $17 million.

Asfour was awarded an Honorary Doctorate from the University of Oxford for his achievements in education and economics.

== Philanthropy ==
Asfour has established a number of investment projects since his return to Palestine that helped create job opportunities to reduce unemployment .

In the mid-1990s, Asfour donated a secondary school in Sinjil. He also made many contributions to the development of Sinjil Club. He is also known for providing annual aid to all Sinjil village projects, including schools, the municipality and the club.

One of his initiatives included the establishment of a bank to support poor people in Palestine, and he pledged to invite businessmen, economists and financers in Palestine to work on providing projects that would develop the national economy and reduce unemployment and poverty.

== Honors and recognitions ==
President Mahmoud Abbas awarded him the Star of Merit from the Orders of the State of Palestine, in recognition of his national role and economic contributions in the field of higher education.
