= Maysoun Ibrahim =

Palestinian academic and technology policy specialist

- Born: Maysoun Ibrahim; Ramallah, Palestine
- Occupations: Academic; Technology Policy Specialist
- Known for: Member of the Board of Trustees, Arab American University (Palestine)
- Board member of: Arab American University Board of Trustees
- Awards: L'Oréal–UNESCO For Women in Science Award; Taawon Youth Award; Hult Prize; Grace Hopper Celebration of Women in Computing

Maysoun Ibrahim (Arabic: ميسون إبراهيم) is a Palestinian academic and technology policy specialist working in the areas of digital transformation, innovation policy, and smart and sustainable cities, with a focus on the Arab region. She is the founding president of the Palestinian Syndicate for Information Sciences and Technology (PALIST), a professional organization supporting the information and communication technology (ICT) sector in Palestine (state), and has served as Vice Chair of the National Cybersecurity Authority of Palestine since 2026.

Her work examines the role of emerging technologies in sustainable development, urban resilience, knowledge-based economies, gender equality, and social inclusion. She has held roles across government institutions, academia, and international organizations, contributing to national and regional strategies related to technology policy and public-sector innovation.

== Early life and education ==
Ibrahim holds a PhD in Information technology for development, with research focusing on smart sustainable cities and their alignment with the United Nations Sustainable Development Goals.

== Career ==
Ibrahim has worked in advisory, academic, and policy-related roles in governmental, academic, and international settings. Her work addresses public-sector modernization, innovation ecosystems, and digital transformation frameworks in Palestine and other parts of the Arab region.

=== National roles ===
Ibrahim is a member of the Higher Council for Innovation and Excellence (HCIE) in Palestine, where she chairs the Experimental Incubation Committee and the National Innovation Supporters Network. In 2019, she chaired the National Forum on the Fourth Industrial Revolution, which examined the implications of emerging technologies for economic and social development.

She has contributed to national initiatives associated with the Ministry of Telecommunications and Digital Economy (Palestine), including programs related to e-government, national digital transformation, cybersecurity, artificial intelligence policy, and the national innovation strategy.

=== Academic and international roles ===
Ibrahim serves on the board of trustees of the Arab American University (Palestine). She is also vice-chair of the university's National Digital Transformation and Artificial Intelligence Center.

She previously served on the management board and senate of the Euro-Mediterranean University of Slovenia.

As a consultant to the United Nations Economic and Social Commission for Western Asia (UN-ESCWA), Ibrahim has contributed to regional research and policy reviews on smart cities, digital innovation in public institutions, the Fourth Industrial Revolution, gender equality through technology, and sustainable urban development.

Her work with UN-ESCWA has informed digital transformation and innovation-related policies in several Arab countries.

== Positions ==
- President, Palestinian Syndicate for Information Sciences and Technology (PALIST) (2021–present);
- Board member, Palestinian International Cooperation Agency (2024–present);
- Vice-chair, National Digital Transformation and Artificial Intelligence Center, Arab American University (Palestine) (2023–present);
- Trustee, Arab American University (Palestine) (2020–present);
- Board member, National Council on Scientific Research (2025–present);
- Chair, Committee on Research Ethics and Artificial Intelligence Ethics, National Council for Scientific Research (2025–present);
- Board member, Higher Council for Innovation and Excellence (2018–present);
- Consultant and reviewer, United Nations Economic and Social Commission for Western Asia (2018–present);
- Jury member, L'Oréal-UNESCO For Women in Science Awards (2019);
- Jury member, Hult Prize (2018–2022);
- Judge, Grace Hopper Celebration of Women in Computing (2013–2018).
- Vice Chair of the National Cybersecurity Authority of Palestine (2026–present).

== Academic work ==
Ibrahim's research addresses digital transformation frameworks, smart sustainable cities, economic urban resilience, and science and technology diplomacy. Her work focuses on data-driven and people-centered approaches to public-sector innovation.

She is the author of the book Smart Sustainable Cities: Transformation towards Future Cities (2020). She has also contributed chapters to international edited volumes and published journal articles and conference papers on smart cities and ICT for development.

== Selected publications ==
- Smart Sustainable Cities: Transformation towards Future Cities (2020)
- Science, Technology and Innovation Diplomacy in the Arab Region with Emphasis on the State of Palestine
- The Fourth Industrial Revolution and Smart Cities in the Time of COVID-19
- UN-ESCWA research studies on digital transformation and gender equality
