= Orders, decorations, and medals of Palestine =

Orders, Decorations and Medals of the State of Palestine

Awarded by the State of Palestine
- Established: 2009–2018
- Awarded for: Contributed in supporting Palestine or having made achievements in various fields, deliver by order of the President
- Grand Master: President of the State of Palestine
- Conseillere: Senior Diplomatic Advisor to the President

Orders, decorations and medals of the State of Palestine are awarded according to a system established and implemented during the period 2009–2018 within the frame of the institutional and state-building process.

During this period, dozens of Heads of States and Governments, diplomats and international prominent figures have been granted these awards in recognition for their contribution in supporting the Palestinian cause and just peace in the region. Many other Palestinian personalities who contributed in raising the status of Palestine in various fields were also honored.

== Historical overview ==
Decorations, medals and badges of Palestine were first awarded for both military and civilian service and contributions to the State of Palestine, in this order Article 117 in 2005.

In the beginning of 2009, and in the frame of institutional and state building process towards the establishing of an independent Palestinian State, President Mahmoud Abbas, President of the State of Palestine and Grand Master of the Orders, Decorations and Medals, entrusted Minister Majdi Khaldi, the Diplomatic Advisor to the President and Conseillere of the Orders, Decorations and Medals of the State of Palestine to lead the efforts of establishing the Palestinian awarding system, and put into act as soon as possible.

The Palestinian awarding system was gradually established in three stages, and three Presidential decrees were issued in 2013, 2016 and 2018 following extensive consultations and efforts led by Minister Khaldi, and after reviewing the previous Palestinian awards, and the history of the international awarding systems.

Three relevant publications including the Orders, Decorations and Medals of the State of Palestine, the Palestinian State' symbols; the national anthem, the Palestinian flag and the emblem of Palestine, were issued and distributed to the Palestinian Embassies, governmental institutions, public libraries and accredited diplomatic corps in Palestine.

In the beginning of 2010, a number of senior awards were issued for Kings & Heads of States and Governments as they were the first aimed categories. In naming these awards, the names of Palestine, Jerusalem & Bethlehem were highlighted, which are: The Order of the Star of Palestine, the Order of Jerusalem, the Medal of the Star of Honor, and the Collar of Bethlehem. Many other Orders were issued for making diversity, and each level is to be awarded to different categories of Palestinian, Arab and international personalities.

The two most excellent Orders between 2009 and 2016 were the Star of Palestine (Grand Cordon), which was awarded to President Vladimir Putin, President Giorgio Napolitano, President François Hollande, President Jacob Zuma, President Mahinda Rajapaksa and the Grand Cordon of the Order of Jerusalem, which was awarded to the Emir of Kuwait Sabah Al-Sabah, King Abdullah II, and many other Heads of States and Governments from all over the world.

As of 2017, the newly established Grand Collar of the Order of the State of Palestine became the most excellent Order, and was awarded to King Salman, King Hamad bin Isa Al Khalifa, President Xi Jinping, and Prime Minister Narendra Modi.

Between 1995 and 2004 President Yasser Arafat awarded medals and medallions to a large number of foreign and Palestinian personalities. The Collar of Bethlehem 2000 was awarded to a number of Heads of States and Governments who visited Bethlehem during the year 2000 celebrations, and also awarded about 100 medals and medallions to Palestinian and foreign personalities.

It was also necessary to establish new awards for Palestinian figures and institutions from several fields: political, national, literary, artistic and scientific. Therefore, the Order of Merit and Distinction (Gold and Silver Levels) was established in 2010, and was later updated in 2016.

The Order of Culture, Science and Arts was also issued and is intended to be awarded to Palestinian and foreign intellects, authors, writers, poets, scientists, researchers and artists in appreciation of their significant works which succeeded at the national level.

The Palestinian Honorary Citizenship was also issued to be granted to esteemed Arab and foreign figures that have a special and strong relationship with Palestine. Martial Awards and Medals of civil and military services were also issued.

In the beginning of 2013, after issuing the Resolution for upgrading Palestine's status to an Observer State in the United Nations, President Mahmoud Abbas issued a decree including all civil and martial awards, medals and medallions which were issued previously. A new decree was issued in 2016, including new modifications in the Palestinian awards system, and in 2018, President Abbas issued a third decree that included all the new modifications. Two new Orders were also established bearing the names of the two Palestinian leaders, President Yasser Arafat and President Mahmoud Abbas.

It is a custom to grant awards in a special celebration to be held in the Palestinian Presidency, whether by the presence of the President who will grant the award himself, or delegating a deputy in case of being absent, delegating a special envoy, or to entrust the Ambassadors of Palestine to carry out this task in case the ceremony occurs abroad.

== Orders of the State of Palestine ==
=== The Order of the State of Palestine ===
Grand Collar

Grand Cordon

Star of Merit

Star of Freedom

Knight of Palestine

The Order of the State of Palestine can be awarded by the order of the President to Kings, Heads of States and Governments and those of similar standing. It can be awarded as well to prominent Palestinian and foreign personalities who have provided outstanding services to Palestine. The Grand Cordon can be awarded by the order of the President to Kings, Heads of States and Governments and those of similar standing. It can be awarded as well to prominent Palestinian and foreign personalities who have provided outstanding services to Palestine.

The Star of Merit is a distinctive level that can be awarded by the order of the President, to Ministers, Ambassadors, Envoys, Governors, Members of Parliaments, Representative of Parties and those of similar standing. The Star of Freedom is a special level in this Order that can be awarded by the order of the President to Palestinian and Foreign Activists who are working for peace. It can be awarded as well, to Members of Parliaments, Representative of parties who supports the freedom and independence of the State of Palestine. It also can be awarded to Palestinian and foreign institutions and officials, businessmen and representatives of civil society, in recognition for outstanding services to the State of Palestine.

The Knight of Palestine is a level in this Order that can be awarded by the order of the President to outstanding and extraordinary individuals in various fields. Those include civil servants, private sector and civil society activists, as well as Arab and foreign individuals of the same rank.

=== The Order of Jerusalem ===
The Grand Cordon is the first high level of this Order and can be awarded by the order of the President to Kings, Presidents, Heads of Governments and those of similar standing. It can be awarded, as well, to prominent Palestinian and foreign personalities who have provided outstanding services to Palestine. The Grand Star is the second-highest level of this Order and can be awarded by the order of the President to Heads of Governments, Ministers, Envoys, Leaders of Parliaments and Parties, and those of similar standing. It can be awarded, as well, to prominent Palestinian and foreign personalities who have similar standing.

Star of Jerusalem is a distinctive level in this Order and can be awarded by the order of the President, to Ministers, Ambassadors, Envoys, Governors, Members of Parliaments, Representative of Parties and those of similar standing. It can be awarded, as well, to prominent Palestinian, Arab and foreign personalities who have provided significant services to Palestine. The Star of Peace is a special level in this Order and can be by the order of the President to Palestinian and Foreign Activists who are working for peace. It can be awarded as well, to Members of Parliaments, Representative of parties who supports the freedom and independence of the State of Palestine. It also can be awarded to Palestinian and foreign institutions and officials, businessmen and representatives of civil society, in recognition for outstanding services to the State of Palestine.

The Knight of Jerusalem is a motivating and inspiring level in this Order and can be awarded by the order of the President to outstanding and extraordinary individuals in various fields. Those include civil servants, private sector and civil society activists, as well as Arab and foreign individuals of the same rank.

=== Order of President Yasser Arafat ===
The Grand Cordon (Star of Honor) is the highest level of this Order that can be awarded by the order of the President to Kings, Heads of States and Governments and those of similar standing, it can also be given to the Heads of the National Council and the Legislative Council and the Chairman and Members of the Executive Committee of the Palestine Liberation Organization and Chairman's and Secretaries General of the Palestinian factions and parties, and of similar standing. It can be awarded as well for Palestinian and Foreign dignitaries that provided of substantial and unprecedented contributions to the Palestinian people.

The Star of Jebus is a distinctive level in this Order that can be awarded by the order of the President, to Ministers, Ambassadors, Envoys, Governors, Members of Parliaments, Representative of Parties and those of similar standing. The Medal of Bravery is a level in this Order that can be awarded by order of the President, to those who have demonstrated courage, initiative and significant performance of their duty towards their work and their homeland.

=== Order of President Mahmoud Abbas ===
The Grand Collar of Canaanites is the highest level in this Order that can be awarded by the order of the President to Kings, Heads of States and Governments and those of similar standing, it can also be given to the Heads of the National Council and the Legislative Council and the Chairman and Members of the Executive Committee of the Palestine Liberation Organization and Chairman's and Secretaries General of the Palestinian factions and parties, and of similar standing. It can be awarded as well for Palestinian and Foreign dignitaries that provided of substantial and unprecedented contributions to the Palestinian people.

The Star of Friendship is a distinctive level in this Order that can be awarded by the order of the President to Ministers, Ambassadors, Envoys, Governors, Members of Parliaments, Representative of Parties and those of similar standing. The Medal of Achievement is a motivating level in this Order that can be awarded by the order of the President to distinguished and creative talents and persons who realized significant achievements and perseverance in the field of their specialties and work.

=== Order of Bethlehem ===
The Grand Collar of Bethlehem is the highest level in this Order that can be awarded by the order of the President to Kings, Presidents, Heads of Governments and those of similar standing. It can be awarded, as well, to prominent Palestinian and foreign personalities who have provided outstanding services to Palestine. The Star of Bethlehem is a distinctive level in this Order that can be awarded by the order of the President to Ministers, Ambassadors, Envoys, Governors, Members of Parliaments, Representative of Parties and those of similar standing.

=== Order of Merit and Distinction ===
The gold variant can be awarded by the order of the President to Ministers, Ambassadors, members to the houses of representatives and senate, representatives of parties and Palestinian, Arab and foreign personalities, and those of similar ranking, as well as to the prominent Palestinian personalities who have provided significant services to the country. The silver variant can be awarded by the order of the President to Ministers, Ambassadors, members to the houses of representatives and senate, representatives of parties and Palestinian, Arab and foreign personalities, and those of similar ranking, as well as to the prominent Palestinian personalities who have provided significant services to the country.

=== Order of Culture, Science and Arts ===
The Grand Star of the Order can be awarded by the order of the President to prominent writers, authors, poets, scientists, intellectuals, university professors and artists in the domains of fine art, theater, music, cinema and other special forms of art. This order is also awarded to such individuals who promote the image of Palestine and Palestinian culture and arts worldwide.

The Brilliance Level of the Order can be awarded by the order of the President to the major Palestinian and foreign intellects, authors, writers, poets, scientists, researchers and artists in appreciation of their excellent works which succeeded at both national and international levels. It can be also awarded to institutions that provided distinguished works and services to Palestine and the humanity.

The Creativity Level of the Order can be awarded by the order of the President to Palestinian and foreign intellects, authors, writers, poets, scientists, researchers and artists in appreciation of their significant works which succeeded at the national level. It can be also awarded to institutions that provided distinguished works and services to Palestine.

The Innovation Level of the Order can be awarded by the order of the President to Palestinian and foreign intellects, authors, writers, poets, scientists, researchers and artists in appreciation of the significant works succeeded at both local and national levels in encouraging them to continue with giving and progress.

== Civilian medals ==
=== Honorary Palestinian Citizenship ===
The Honorary Palestinian Citizenship can be awarded by the order of the President to Arab and foreign personalities who have provided significant services to Palestine, in recognition of the role thereof and as encouragement to continue their support to the State of Palestine.

=== Medal of Merit and Distinction ===
"Gold" Medal of Merit and Distinction can be awarded by the order of the President to ministers, ambassadors and members of the parliament as well as to Palestinian personalities and individuals who have provided outstanding services in addition to Arab and foreign personalities. "Silver" Medal of Merit and Distinction can be awarded by the order of the President to senior officials of the State, as well as to Palestinian personalities and individuals who have provided outstanding services in addition to Arab and foreign personalities.

=== Medals of Al Quds ===
Medals of Al Quds can be awarded by the order of the President to personalities and members of the Palestinian people who have provided services to the county and can be awarded to Arab and foreign personalities.

== Military Orders ==
The Military Order of the Star of Palestine is considered a middle rank military order that can be awarded by the order of the President to Palestinian, Arab and foreign military and security leaders who have provided services to Palestine.

The Military Order of the Star of Jerusalem is considered as a middle rank military order that can be awarded by the order of the President to Palestinian, Arab and foreign military and security leaders who have provided services to Palestine.

The Military Order of the Star of Honor is considered a middle rank military order that can be awarded by the order of the President to Palestinian, Arab and foreign military and security leaders who have provided services to Palestine.

== Notable Recipients ==
- King Abdullah II of Jordan
- King Salman of Saudi Arabia
- King Hamad of Bahrain
- Emir of Kuwait Sheikh Sabah Al Sabah
- President Xi Jinping of the People's Republic of China
- President Vladimir Putin of Russia
- President Francois Hollande of France
- President Giorgio Napolitano of Italy
- President Dmitry Medvedev of Russia
- President Sebastian Pinera of Chile
- President Khalifa Bin Zayed of UAE
- President Mahinda Rajapaksa of Sri Lanka
- Prime Minister Narendra Modi of India
- Prime Minister José Luis Rodríguez Zapatero of Spain
- Prince Walid bin Talal of Saudi Arabia
- President Joko Widodo of Indonesia

== Bibliography ==
- Roland Friedrich, Arnold Luethold, Firas Milhem, The security sector legislation of the Palestinian National Authority, DCAF – Geneva Centre for the Democratic Control of Armed Forces, Geneva, 2008, ISBN 978-92-9222-077-8, p. 204-209.
- Antonio Pietro Barrio, Colecciones Militares – Cintas – Palestina, http://www.coleccionesmilitares.com, Pinto, 2013.
