= Honorary citizenship of Palestine =

Honorary citizenship of Palestine can be awarded to "Arab and foreign personalities who have provided significant services to Palestine".

== Recipients ==
List of recipients of honorary Palestinian citizenship
Recipient	Date	Notes	Ref.
Sofia Sakorafa		Greek politician and athlete	
Daniel Barenboim	2009	Israeli conductor and pianist	
Moni Ovadia	13 December 2025	Italian artist and activist	
