= Majdi Khaldi =

Palestinian Diplomat and Ambassador

- Khaldi in Ramallah, 2017

Senior Diplomatic Advisor to the President of Palestine
- Incumbent
- Assumed office 2006

Conseillère of the Orders, Decorations and Medals of the State of Palestine
- Incumbent
- Assumed office 2009

Personal details
- Born: 14 April 1961 (age 65)
- Spouse: Jazia Khaldi
- Children: Hani, Yasser, Adam

Majdi Khaldi (Arabic: مجدي الخالدي; born April 14, 1961) is a Palestinian diplomat and ambassador. He is the senior diplomatic advisor to Palestinian President Mahmoud Abbas, holding the rank of minister. Khaldi has previously served in the Palestinian National Authority from 1994 through 2006 in multiple roles, including deputy minister of foreign affairs, acting deputy minister of the Ministry of Planning and International Cooperation, and director general of the Ministry of Planning and International Cooperation. Khaldi was also a member of the Palestinian negotiations support team for the implementation of the Oslo Accords with Israel. He is a current member of the Palestinian National Council.

== Early life ==
Majdi Khaldi descends from the Khalidi family, a family that has history in Jerusalem and Palestine since 636 AD. His parents immigrated from Ramla, Palestine to Port Said, and later moved to Arish and Cairo, Egypt as a result of the 1948 Palestinian expulsion and flight. His family became refugees in Egypt after the war. Khaldi has six sisters and brothers.

== Career ==
=== 1985–2003: Early career and ministry work ===
Khaldi started his career as an engineer in automation, management of technology, and computer industry in Romania, Canada, the United States, Algeria and Egypt. Between 1985 and 1992 he worked in consultancy and management in an international consultancy firm in engineering in Cairo, Egypt. In 1993, Khaldi returned to Palestine after the signing of the Oslo Accords, and was a member of the Palestinian negotiations support team for the implementation of the Oslo agreement with Israel. He served in this position until 1994.

Khaldi served as the director general of the Ministry of Planning and International Cooperation from 1994 to 2000. His duties including acting as the head of the international cooperation sector, Arab countries, North America, Japan and Pacific Ocean countries, Asia and Africa and Eastern Europe departments. In addition, he assisted in establishing the ministry's first organizational structure and was a senior member of its management, and assisted in the establishment of National Center for Public Administration, the government computer center, and the program for diplomatic training.

In 2001, Khaldi was appointed acting deputy minister of the Ministry of Planning and International Cooperation, where he headed the international cooperation sector of the ministry, including political, development cooperation, and economic sectors.

=== 2003–present: Diplomatic work ===
In the year 2003 Khaldi left the Ministry of Planning and International Cooperation, he was appointed an ambassador in the Palestinian Ministry of Foreign Affairs and served as the deputy minister. During his service as deputy minister of foreign affairs, Khaldi headed a number of bilateral and multilateral committees. He helped in the forming of the organizational structure of the Ministry of Foreign Affairs, and the Palestinian Law of Diplomatic Corps that was approved by the Palestinian Legislative Council in 2005, and is being implemented ever since. "His efforts allowed for the modernization of 90 Embassies and Missions of the State of Palestine"

Khaldi was appointed as the diplomatic advisor to President Mahmoud Abbas in 2006 and is currently serving in this position, with the rank of minister. Khaldi assists and advice the president in matters related to diplomatic, political affairs, and international bilateral and multilateral relations. Khaldi supervised the establishing of the Orders and Medals of the State of Palestine, and is the concelliere of the Palestinian Orders and Medals.

Khaldi headed and membered a number of key bilateral and multilateral committees as an ambassador, including:

- Coordinator of the US–Palestinian Bilateral Committee (USPBS) (1997–2002)
- Member to the Palestinian – European Commission Association Agreement Council (1996–2005)
- Head of the Palestinian Coordination Bilateral Committees with the Arab Countries (1995–2005).
- Member of the Palestinian delegations to Arab Summits, UNGA, OIC.
- Member of the Palestinian delegation to the Davos World Economic Forum 1995, 1996, 1997, 2000, 2003 (Dead Sea - Jordan), Forum of the Future (2004–2006), and World Economic Forum, Dead Sea (2010–2017)
- Member of the Palestinian official delegation to the International Donor Conferences to Palestine (AHLC and CG) between (1995–2005) and London meetings to support the PA (March 2005)
- Board member of the Palestinian Investment and Promotion Authority (1999–2004)
- National coordinator for Harvard Leadership (Good Governance) Program for Palestine (1998–2004)
- Board member of the Presidential Committee for Christians and Churches Affairs.
- Member of the Palestinian National Council (PNC)

== Honors ==
Khaldi received the following state orders and medals:

- France: Commander of the National Order of Merit (May 2016)
- Italy: Knight of the Order of Merit of the Italian Republic (December 2014)
- Spain: Commander of the Order of Civil Merit (June 2016)
- Brazil: Grand Cross of the Order of Rio Branco (October 2018)

His other awards include the Medal of Honor from the Mexican Academy of International Law in November 2009 and an award from Russia's Imperial Orthodox Palestine Society.
