= Order of the State of Palestine =

Palestinian civil order of merit

Awarded by State of Palestine
- Type: Order of merit with 5 degrees
- Status: currently constituted

Statistics
- First induction: 2015

Precedence
- Next (lower): Order of Jerusalem
- Ribbon of the order

The Order of the State of Palestine is the highest civilian order of the State of Palestine. It can be given to foreign dignitaries, kings, heads of state or government and persons of similar rank by the State of Palestine.

== Notable recipients ==
- King Salman of Saudi Arabia
- King Hamad of Bahrain
- King Simeon II, former Monarch and Prime Minister of Bulgaria
- Sheikh Nawaf Al-Ahmad Al-Jaber Al-Sabah of Kuwait, Speaker of the National Assembly Marzouq Al-Ghanem and Prime Minister Jaber Al-Mubarak Al-Hamad Al-Sabah
- President Klaus Iohannis of Romania
- President Vladimir Putin of Russia
- President Dmitry Medvedev of Russia
- President François Hollande of France
- President Giorgio Napolitano of Italy
- President Beji Caid Essebsi, Tunisia
- President Sebastián Piñera of Chile
- President Xi Jinping of China
- President Khalifa bin Zayed Al Nahyan of (United Arab Emirates) UAE
- Prime Minister Narendra Modi of India.
- Prime Minister José Luis Rodríguez Zapatero of Spain
- Prince Walid bin Talal of Saudi Arabia
- President Kais Saied of Tunisia
- President Abdelmadjid Tebboune of Algeria
- President Joko Widodo of Indonesia
- President Gustavo Petro of Colombia
- MEP Diana Iovanovici Șoșoacă, Romania
