= List of Israeli music inspired by the Gaza war =

The October 7 attacks and the subsequent Gaza war, had a significant impact on Israeli music.

== Songs released prior to October 7, 2023 ==
Some songs which are culturally significant to the ongoing war were released prior to the 7 October attack:

- In February 2023, Kfir Tsafrir released the song "Fear of God". The song was an unexpected hit and in November, about nine months after its release, it began to gain virality on the TikTok viral streams. The song reached first place on the Mako chart, Kan Gimel top ten chart, and Galgalat official chart.
- On 30 July 2023, Avi Aburomi released the single "Where Are You?" With the singer Raviv Kaner, which reached number 73 on the Mako site's hit list, this song was used to give strength to the IDF and the population in general after the October 7 Hamas-led attack on Israel and during the Gaza war.

== Tribute songs ==
=== Released between 7 October 2023 and 31 December 2023 ===
- On 11 October, the rapper E-Z released the song "October Seventh" and on October 22 he released "Winter 23" together with Odeya, in memory of those killed in the war. It was included in the mini-album Iron Swords that Odeya released on November 16.
- The singer Hanan Ben Ari released "Moledet" (Homeland) on October 16, which was written before the war and officially released following it. It achieved nationwide success and was the first Iron Swords War song to be ranked first on Media Forest. and third place in Galgalatz
- Eyal Golan released "Am Israel Hay" on October 19, which was also ranked first. He decided to donate its profits to ERAN (an Israeli organization that provides mental health support).
- On 19 October, Ami Mimon and Udi Damari released “With Eternity” to lift national morale, and Elanit released “I Bear a Prayer”.
- On 21 October, Atara Oria's “Forever” was released, written to commemorate the heroism of the Israel Police and Israel Border Police fighters.
- On 22 October, Pe'er Tasi’s “Lo Tira" (Do Not Fear) was released, and singer Etti Ankri’s “Hatikva" (The Hope), which she rewrote based on Israel's national anthem “Hatikvah”.
- On 24 October, singer-songwriter Yuval Dayan released “Guard Your Heart”.
- On 26 October, Omer Adam and Infected Mushroom released “Dance Forever”, dedicated to the memory of those murdered in the Re'im music festival massacre, and Eliana Tidhar and Lee Biran’s “Good News”.
- On 27 October, the singer Bar Tzabari released “Don’t Want to Be Sad”. At the end of October 2023, Ido B Zooki released “Angels” to commemorate those murdered and tell the story of the victims of the nature party massacre, the singer Yaniv Ben Mashiach released the prayer song “Speak to Me”, and the singer Dudu Aharon released “There’s Still a World” which he dedicated to all of the war's casualties.
- On 31 October, the song "You Will Return" was released, a collaboration between Idan Raichel's project and Roni Dalumi, dedicated to the captives and murdered.
- On 1 November, Osher Cohen released the song “Tirkedi (10/7/23)” in memory of the victims of the nature party massacre, with the names of those murdered on October 7 appearing in the music video.
- On 2 November, the singer Eliav Zohar released “As One Body”.
- On 3 November, the singer Shlomi Shabbat released “Bedamaich chaii”.
- On 5 November, the singer Narkis released “Habalada LaMechakot”.
- On 6 November, Shulem Lemmer released "Kehilos Hakodesh"
- On 7 November, eleven musicians recorded “One Nation”.
- On 8 November, Gal Adam published a cover of the song "Akhat Sadha" by Amir Benayoun featuring singer Mor. A song in support of the IDF soldiers, hostages and the Israeli nation in general.
- On 9 November, the singer Astar Shamir released the song "Back Home", which she based on "A Walk to Caesarea". She released the version for the Israelis who were kidnapped by Hamas, and the video clip for the song features their photos.
- On 12 November, the singers Sarit Hadad and Eden Hason released “Aanachnu Ze Goral" (We Are Fate), and the band Jane Bordo released “Not Alone”.
- Also on 12 November, Israeli rapper Maor Ashkenazi and the survivor of the Nova music festival massacre Noam Cohen released the single Noam's Song 2, debuting at number 33 on the Mako chart. At its peak, it reached number 26 on the charts.
- On 13 November, the singer Deikla released the song "Bring Them Home" together with the Ariel Youth band, for the sake of the captives and the longing to bring them back home.
- The duo Ness & Stila released “Harbu Darbu” on 14 November 2023, dedicated to the security forces and IDF soldiers.
- On 19 November, the Haredi creator Yair Elitzur released the song “No Consolation” together with a soundtrack by Rabbi Shalom Aroosh.
- On 20 November, the singer Moshe Peretz released “You Shall Remain Forever” whose music video included pictures of ten of the fallen, and “Hear O Israel” by David Broza and Avraham Tal was also released.
- On November 20, 2023 rapper Vibe Ish released the song "Lan" written in memory of Ido Peretz, who was killed in a Re'im music festival massacre.
- On 22 November, Mordechai Roth and Mordechai Weberman published a duet in which they perform the song “Yearning”, following comforting a mourner at a father who lost his son in the surprise attack and poured out his pain.
- On 22 November, the song "Libi E'r" (My Heart is Awake) was released, a collaboration between the Haredi creator Avromi Weinberg and the rapper Issac The 2nd (Yitzhak Maracha), who wrote the lyrics for the song in English.
- On 26 November, the singer Moshe Klein released the song "You Will Return Home" which deals with praying for the return of the captives to their homes.
- On 28 November, the singer Mendel Ratha released the song "And the Sons Will Return" which was dedicated to praying for the return of the captives.
- In December 2023, Static and singer Agam Buhbut, who both participated in the original version of "Katan Aleinu", released a new version of the song entitled "יחד תמיד," (Yachad Tamid) or "Always Together." The song was released in partnership with the Israel Defense Forces and features Buhbut, who is a band member in the Education and Youth Corps, and Static, who is a reservist, both in uniform. The song was intended to support Israel during the 2023 Gaza war and features a rap breakdown highlighting work done by female soldiers.
- In December, Moshe Korsia released a war song called "Lo Yihyu Po Milchamot" (There Will Be No Wars Here) which garnered hundreds of thousands of views within days. The song also reached #78 on the Mako weekly Hitlist chart.
- On 6 December, the band Lola Marsh released the song "Until You Return, Until You Come Back".
- On 20 December, Aviv Geffen released the song “Black Sunrise” together with Mia Leimberg. Mia Leimberg is the girl who was released from captivity in Gaza, with her dog Bella in her arms. On the same day, the song “In the End Everything Will Be Alright” by Lior Narkis was released, peaking at number one on Media Forest's weekly airplay chart.
- On 27 December, Benny Landau released the song “Hitna'ari”, praying for strength for all fighters, recovery for all injured, and release of all captives. The song incorporates passages from the Lecha Dodi liturgical poem and prophecies of comfort from the Bible, mainly the Book of Isaiah.

=== Released in 2024 ===
- On 7 January 2024, Raviv Kaner released the single "Home", which he wrote during his reserve duty during the Gaza war.
- On 14 January 2024, Yoni Bloch released the song “Between the Sea and the River”, the song's cover is a painting by Amir Lavi who fell on October 7.
- On 14 January, Rotem Cohen released the song “He Who Hates You Will Die”, defined as a love song for the country. A music video was filmed for the song showing the singer in uniform, with the participation of soldiers.
- On 15 January, Yonatan Razel released the song “Time of War” (a gift song for soldiers) to encourage and lift morale among IDF soldiers. On the same day, Pe'er Tasi and Shlomo Artzi released jointly the song "Nehar HaDma'ot" ("The river of tears").
- On January 22, through the labels Avi Guetta Productions and Helikon Aroma Music. The single "My Blood" by Israeli singers Sasson Ifram Shaulov and Odia was released. "My Blood" is a love song. The song entered at number 23 on the chart, and a week later reached number eight, with Shalov having four songs in the chart's top ten and eight on the chart in total.
- On 29 January, the duo Subliminal and The Shadow, together with Raviv Kanner, released the song “It’s on Us”, encouraging the fighting spirit of IDF soldiers during the War of Iron Swords.
- On 19 February, the band Hatikvah 6 released the song “Giborey Al" (Super Heroes), telling the story of the people of Israel, who at the moment they are called to the flag leave their daily lives for homeland defense as part of their military service.
- On 22 January, Yaakov Shwekey released the song "Give Me Strength", a song that was created following a personal connection with the family of Uri Danino who was kidnapped to Gaza, and in prayer for his return and the return of the other captives.
- On 18 February, the song "Overturn Every Stone" was released, a collaboration between the singer Sagiv Cohen and the children's star Einat Madmony. In the video clip for the song, alongside Cohen and Madmony, some family members of the captives also appear, presenting photos of their loved ones with words and calls of love.
- On 10 March, Eden Golan released the song "Hurricane" which was a modification of her song Originally titled "October Rain." It was toned down for submission to Eurovision Song Contest 2024 in which Golan finished fifth, second in televoting.
- On 18 June, Yair Elitzur released the song "Tamid Ohev Oti" with lyrics composed by Rabbi Shalom Arush, which express hope for divine goodness.

== Satirical songs ==
- On 13 December 2023, Eretz Nehederet released a song titled "Gaza's sky is black but Qatar is always sunny". A parody of K-pop singer Lisa's "Money", the song draws attention to the wealth of Hamas leaders Ismail Haniyeh, Khaled Mashaal and Mousa Abu Marzouk.
