= Sephardic Hasidim =

Sephardic practitioners of Hasidic Judaism

Sephardic Hasidim are Sephardi and Mizrahi adherents of Hasidic Judaism, a mystical and typically (but not always) Haredi Jewish religious movement originating in Eastern Europe among the Ashkenazim.

== History ==
In the late 19th and 20th centuries, as Sephardim and Ashkenazi Hasidim increasingly came into contact with one another, many Sephardim began joining the ranks of Hasidic sects such as Chabad, Breslov, and Satmar. The merging of these traditions was particularly notable in the Sephardic communities of Israel, though Sephardic Hasidim exist in other countries such as; the United States and Morocco.

== Notable Sephardic Hasidim ==
- Rabbi Shalom Arush - Moroccan - Breslov
- Yair Elitzur - Persian - Breslov
- Yisroel Meir Gabbai - Moroccan - Breslov
- Rabbi Shmuley Boteach - Persian - Chabad
- Rabbi Aryeh Kaplan - Greek - Breslov/Neo-Hasidic

== See also ==
- Sephardic Haredim
- Breslov
- Chabad
- Shalom Arush
