= Killing of Eliahu Amedi =

On 15 November 1986, 22-year-old Israeli yeshiva student Eliahu Amedi was murdered in the Old City of Jerusalem by three Palestinians affiliated with the Popular Front for the Liberation of Palestine. The murder significantly worsened tensions in the Israeli–Palestinian conflict, sparking almost two weeks of anti-Arab rioting in Jerusalem.

== Events ==
=== Murder and trial ===
On 15 November 1986, Israeli yeshiva student Eliahu Amedi was attacked by three Palestinians in the Old City of Jerusalem, being stabbed during the ensuing struggle. Amedi died as a result of the injuries he sustained. 22 years old, Amedi was a student at the Breslov Shuvu Bonim yeshiva in Jerusalem. He was later buried in the Mount of Olives Jewish Cemetery.

On 30 November, three Palestinians were formally charged with Amedi's murder. Police stated that they had been arrested shortly after the murder and belonged to the Marxist Popular Front for the Liberation of Palestine, despite the Fatah Force 17 having claimed responsibility. The accused were Samer Mahroun, as well as brothers Hamza and Omar Zayed. All three were from Jenin, in the West Bank. According to Haaretz, one of the three had previously been incarcerated by Israel, being released in the 1985 Jibril Agreement.

=== Anti-Arab riots ===
Following the murder, anti-Arab riots erupted among the Israeli population of Jerusalem. The riots included destroying Arab-owned cars, throwing firebombs at Arab houses, as well as assaulting and stone throwing at Arabs on the streets of the city.

On 18 November, Palestinians in East Jerusalem declared a general strike in protest against the riots. Palestinian schools in Jerusalem also closed early due to the riots. On 19 November, Kach secretary Baruch Marzel was arrested by police and detained for 24 hours on suspicion of organising rioters.

On 20 November, a memorial service for Amedi was held, guarded by 400 police officers to prevent rioting. That day, however, Ratz MK Ran Cohen was attacked by a group of ultranationalist Israelis as he headed to offer his condolences to Amedi's family, requiring hospitalisation at the Hadassah Medical Center. At least four Arab-owned houses in the Sheikh Jarrah neighbourhood were targeted by firebombs that day.

On 23 November, a memorial march for Amedi was held, attended by around 1000 participants. During the march, the participants chanted "Death to Arabs!" and "We want revenge!" After the march passed through the Damascus Gate, the participants attacked Arab-owned shops and Arabs who had not hidden. One marcher was quoted by Israeli radio as declaring "We've got to kill Teddy Kollek, and we've got to get rid of all the Arabs. We will not be quiet until all the Arabs are gone." Later that day, Israel Police national chief commissioner David Kraus reported that the police had found several caches of illegal weapons in Jerusalem. He also reported that Shuvu Bonim yeshiva students in Jerusalem had habitually harassed the Arab population of the city, including by throwing bags of human waste at Arab homes.

On 24 November, Palestinians in Jerusalem held a funeral march for Anwar Nuseibeh, a prominent politician considered a Palestinian moderate. While some of the marchers chanted Palestinian Liberation Organisation slogans, the march passed without any clashes.

On 1 December, Israeli police banned all marches and demonstrations within the Old City of Jerusalem, restricting any funeral proceedings to cemeteries, in an attempt to repress the riots. On 4 December, a molotov cocktail was thrown at an Arab-owned house in the Jerusalem Muslim Quarter, and police discovered several more prepared near the Shuvu Bonim yeshiva.

On 16 December, following the end of a 30-day mourning period for Amedi, an Arab house in the Shmuel HaNavi neughbourhood about 200 metres away from Amedi's house was targeted with a gasoline bomb, without resulting in any injuries. That same day, a truck driven by an Arab in the neighbourhood was targeted by stone throwing. Later that week, Israeli police raided the Shuvu Bonim yeshiva and the Diaspora Yeshiva for weapons caches following the arrest of a student from the Shuvu Bonim for his participation in the anti-Arab riots and in an arson campaign against bus stop shelters. In response to the searches, influential Israeli ultranationalist Meir Kahane called for the creation of a "second Jewish Underground," leading to a police investigation on charges of incitement.

== Reactions ==
=== In Israel ===
Prime Minister of Israel Yitzhak Shamir released a statement on behalf of the Israeli government thanking the police for "speedily apprehending the suspects in the despicable murder and for doing its best to preserve law and order," calling for "the entire population in Jerusalem to refrain from disruptions of order, so as to maintain the peace." President of Israel Chaim Herzog warned that the riots brought "tremendous danger to the standing and image of Jerusalem."

Ultranationalist rabbi Moshe Levinger accused the government of being too weak to prevent the murder. Eliezer Berland, head of the Shuvu Bonim yeshiva stated that "Arabs now believe they can thrust a knife into the back of any Jew," and that "We will avenge this spilled Jewish blood."

Mayor of Jerusalem Teddy Kollek called for the Israeli government to "deal with the phenomenon of the yeshiva which consistently provokes the Arab population," accusing the rioters of unwittingly helping the Palestinian Liberation Organisation. Sephardic Chief Rabbi of Israel Mordechai Eliyahu called for Jews not to be "drawn into acts that violate the spirit of the Torah."

On 25 November, four of the left-wing parties in the Knesset presented a no confidence motion in the government over its handling of the riots. The motion was defeated.

=== In Palestine ===
Grand Mufti of Jerusalem Saad al-Alami blamed the rioting on "extreme Zionist groups" and called for Arabs in Jerusalem to be protected.

== Aftermath ==
Late-1986 would continue to be a tumultuous time in Israel and the Occupied Palestinian Territories. On 4 December, a significant wave of protests broke out across Palestine after Israeli forces shot and killed two Birzeit University students protesting a roadblock. Later, in 1987, the largest wave of protests and strikes in Palestine since the beginning of the occupation would break out, the First Intifada.

In 1990, Omar Zayed escaped from Israeli custody. He then moved to the Bulgarian capital of Sofia since 1994, where he ran a grocery store and raised a family. In December 2015, Bulgarian police announced that they would comply with an Israeli extradition request for Zayed, giving him 72 hours to turn himself into Bulgarian police or face arrest. Zayed refused to turn himself in, instead seeking sanctuary in the Palestinian embassy. Hamza Zayed claimed that they had faced torture while imprisoned in Israel, including beatings and extended detention in solitary confinement. On 26 February 2016, Zayed was discovered seriously injured in the garden of the embassy, and died before he could be taken to hospital. His death sparked a number of allegations of murder, with an embassy staffer telling local news that violence had been involved. Eliahu Amedi's sister told Israeli media that she was "pleased that he was assassinated, and that his wife is a widow, with three children. Now it's not only us who suffer, but her too. It's sad that he was able to walk around freely all these years." In March 2016, Bulgarian chief prosecutor Sotir Tsatsarov stated that the Bulgarian authorities did not consider the case to be murder, saying that "that has been established is that the cause of death was a fall from the third floor of the building. We have not found any other possible causes of death."

== See also ==
- 1986 in Israel
