= Amedi (surname) =

Amedi is a surname. Notable people with the surname include:

- Eliahu Amedi (died 1986), Israeli murder victim
- Idan Amedi (born 1988), Israeli singer-songwriter and actor
