= Tamid Ohev Oti =

2024 Hebrew song by Yair Elitzur

Single by Yair Elitzur
- Language: Hebrew
- Released: June 18, 2024
- Length: 3:37
- Songwriters: Yair Elitzur, Shalom Arush
- Composers: Yair Elitzur, Oren Levi

"Tamid Ohev Oti" (Hebrew: תמיד אוהב אותי, lit. '(The Lord) Always Loves Me'), also known as "Od Yoter Tov" (Hebrew: עוד יותר טוב, lit. 'Even better'), is a Hebrew song originally released by Yair Elitzur on 18 June 2024. Part of a trend of "religious pop", it has become very popular in Israel and among Jews around the world and is considered one of the songs inspired by the Gaza war.

The eternal love between God and his people described in the song has some contrasts with the Musar movement, which has pushed back on this approach.

== Background ==
Yair Elitzur, an Israeli singer, was asked by his rabbi, Shalom Arush, to write a song using the words that were often said by Arush: "God, blessed is He, always loves me and I will always have nothing but good." Arush added, "Whoever says these words with joy, God will always do him only good, this is a promise! Heaven will guide him to have only good and even better and even better."

Elitzur composed the song, together with Rabbi Oren Levi. Its musical production was handled by Ohad Darshan. In an early performance before the song was released, it was called "Yesh Emunah"; as Elitzur explained before performing, the title was in response to his previous song "Ein Nechama". (Note: "Ein Nechama" means "[there is] no consolation", while "Yesh Emunah" means "there is faith")

The song describes hope, a deep and unwavering faith in the relationship between man and God, focusing on His unconditional love. The speaker in the song expresses feelings of affection, compassion, and support that he receives from God both in moments of crisis and weakness and in joy and happiness. He believes that God sees his own good intentions, even when in reality his actions fail. In addition, the speaker asks God for various blessings such as livelihood, good health, and happiness. Rabbi Arush said in an interview that "God surprised me that the song caught on so well with the entire Jewish people."

== Reception ==
As of March 2025, the song has more than 5.3 million views on YouTube. The song was voted Song of the Year 2024 by streaming app 24Six and Song of the Year 5784 in the annual music chart of Israeli radio station Kol BaRama. The song is considered "religious pop" and its popularity reflects the increasing influence that religion is having on mainstream culture in Israel.

On 17 December, Elitzur said in an interview on the Israeli TV show The Patriots that he created the song at the request of his rabbi in order to fulfill his duty, but he was not impressed by it at first: "And this song, forgive me for telling you, as far as I'm concerned, was very silly."

Kobi Peretz released a cover of the song in which he sang along with Rabbi Arush. Covers were also released by Itzik Dadya, Bracha Jaffe, Six13, and the Maccabeats. A Yiddish cover was performed by Shloime Askal together with Yoeli Klein and Levi Falkowitz. Singers Yoeli Davidovitz and Shuki Goldstein also released a Hasidic version of the song with lyrics from the original.

On 17 September, Israeli singer Sasson Shaulov released a cover version of the song, as a single of an album. The release came shortly after the 2024 Lebanon electronic device attacks, which Amit Segal of Yedioth Ahronoth described as perfect timing, as it was an encouraging song during a turning point in the war. His version was more successful than the original, reaching number one on Israeli song charts. Elitzur, the original performer of the song, said he had no interest in honor and that the main thing was that the people of Israel be happy. In an interview with Ynet, he said that after releasing the song, he waited for a cover to be released to publicize the song.

On 12 January 2025, an official Spanish-language version of the song was released by Rabbi Yonatan Galed, a student of Rabbi Shalom Arush and his official Spanish interpreter.

== Criticism ==
The song is criticized for presenting a distorted image of faith in God. The song claims that since God loves man, it is inevitable that man will be well, which contradicts the prevailing view in Judaism, expressed, for example, in the words of the Chazon Ish:

An old error has become ingrained in the hearts of many regarding the concept of bitachon ... However, the true nature of bitachon is to remember that circumstance does not rule us ... because circumstance does not exist. Rather, everything is from Him, whether for the seeming-good or the seeming-bad.

Professor Dov Schwartz wrote that the poem represents the Hasidic approach to the degree of bitachon.

This claim was repeated by Rabbi Ezriel Auerbach and Rabbi Avraham Deutsch, who also wrote that "the song is heresy." Rabbi Arush responded to his words.

Dror Rafael criticized the song in Maariv and claimed that the song represses and ignores reality. Instead of dealing with the harsh reality of the world, it puts the listener into a utopian trance of "everything is fine." In a column in HaAyin HaShevi'it wrote similar things, and added: "The song produces a much more brutal form of self-acceptance - repression. God becomes a good father who defends his bratty child, whom the singer plays. The metaphor in itself is ancient, but the execution is original. The child's evil here is clumsy and ridiculous: "I want to be good - I just can't." The child not only makes a mistake, but also fails to change, which causes him to try to start over again and again without success."

Rabbi Avraham Stav agreed with the arguments but wrote that Elitzur's version is more subtle, according to him his fantasy is a conscious fantasy, his optimism is a prayer and not a general statement. In contrast, Rabbi Chaim Navon wrote that the song is not a plea to God but a firm declaration, which errs both in placing reward as the focus of faith, and in the absolute assertion that God will always shower only good upon us.

Ravit Hecht, in a critical article in Haaretz, wrote that the expectation of a miracle in the song "reveals the depth of the individual's present-day plight; a well-dug pit, which deprives the solution of human ability."

Yarden Avni, in a review column in Calcalist, wrote that the song is problematic because it relieves the person of self-criticism and activism regarding the situation.

Haviva Pedaya wrote about the context of the song to Rabbi Nachman of Breslov and argued that the principle of security in Breslov is more complicated and holds that even if difficult things happen to a person, it is still defined as good because of the final outcome.

Rabbi Ilai Ofran, in an interview with Ynet, claimed that the song's success stems from both its light music and the person's need to hear that they are loved. He also claimed that the song represents processes in religious society and shows an attitude of extreme individualism, self-interest that replaces values.

Rabbi Yoni Lavie wrote that the song was successful against a backdrop of despair due to the Gaza war. Like his predecessors, he criticized the perception of security and the childishness in the song. He also wrote that the song perceives God as "a protector" in contrast to the position of Judaism.

Haaretz reporter Josh Breiner criticized the song, which expresses joy against the backdrop of the Gaza war and ignores its 1,800 casualties.

Amit Slonim wrote in a column on Walla that the reviews of the song are irrelevant, because sometimes a cute song is just a cute song that provides comfort to people. He continued by comparing the song to Rosé's Apt., which was successful despite its ridiculous lyrics.
