= Sephardic Haredim =

Jewish ethnic and religious group

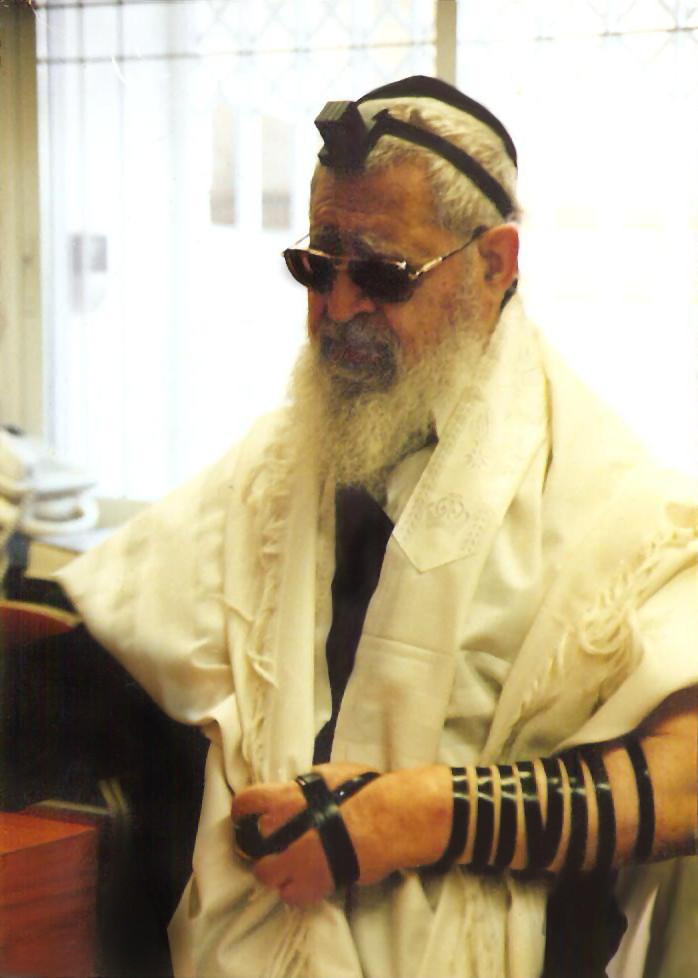
Rabbi Ovadia Yosef was the most influential Sephardic Haredi leader. He was also the spiritual leader of the Shas political party.

Sephardic Haredim are Jews of Sephardi and Mizrahi descent who are adherents of Haredi Judaism. According to Rabbi Ovadia Yosef, Sephardic Jews are called Sepharadim (Hebrew for "Iberians") because they accepted guidance from the Rambam, known as "The Spaniard". Sephardic Haredim today constitute a significant stream of Haredi Judaism, along with Sephardic Hasidim, and the Ashkenazi Hasidim and Lita'im. An overwhelming majority of Sephardic Haredim reside in Israel, where Sephardic Haredi Judaism emerged and developed. Although there is a lack of consistency in many of the statistics regarding Haredim in Israel, it is thought that some 20% of Israel's Haredi population are Sephardic Haredim. This figure is disputed by Shas, which claims that the proportion is "much higher than 20%", and cites voting patterns in Haredi cities to support its position.

Sephardic Haredim differ from their Ashkenazi Hasidic and Litvishe counterparts in a number of significant ways. The central differentiating factor is that Sephardic Haredim follow the rulings and customs of their rabbis, which are rooted in the traditions of the Jews in Israel. Additional differences exist on issues such as political allegiance, as the vast majority of Sephardic Haredim are identified with Shas, while most Ashkenazi Haredim are identified with either United Torah Judaism or, to a lesser extent, HaEdah HaChareidis.

Sephardic Haredim as a community tend to be moderately supportive of Zionism, while maintaining a theological neutrality regarding the existence of the State of Israel. Ashkenazi Haredim as a community exhibit a broader spectrum of views. In 2010, the Shas party, which represents an overwhelming majority of Sephardic Haredim, became the first Haredi political party to join the World Zionist Organization.

== Background ==
The emergence of a coherent Sephardic stream of Haredi Judaism is a relatively recent development in Jewish history. In contrast to Ashkenazic communities, most Haredi leaders in the 19th-century rejected religious modernization trends, except for a few figures. In the early 20th century, the dominant Sephardic Haredi institution was Porat Yosef Yeshiva in Jerusalem. Porat Yosef Yeshiva quickly became a reputable Sephardic institution, educating many students and even "exporting" Rabbinic leadership to Jewish communities in the Muslim world. Politically, it followed a position close to Agudath Yisrael. Alongside Porat Yosef Yeshiva, there were a number of Sephardic Haredi Rabbis, not affiliated with any particular institution nor with each other, who were strongly opposed to Zionism, the State of Israel, modernity, and secularism, much like the Askhenazi Edah HaChareidis. Their attempt to form a Sephardic counterpart to the Edah, HaEdah HaChareidit HaSpharadit, was largely unsuccessful, as it failed to attract a significant membership. Of these two groups, the dominant was undoubtedly Porat Yosef Yeshiva.

The second significant stage in the development of Sephardic Haredi Judaism occurred in the first decades following the establishment of the State of Israel. During this period, there was wave of Sephardic and Mizrahi Jews who were educated in Lita'i Haredi Yeshivas, and consequently adopted the worldview and lifestyle of the Ashkenazi Haredim. Both of these stages were largely unsuccessful in reaching the broader Sephardic community.

The latest, and undoubtedly the most successful and widespread, iteration of Sephardic Haredism was brought about by the advent of Shas. The most significant religious figure in this movement is Rabbi Ovadia Yosef, himself educated in Porat Yosef Yeshiva, who sought to defend and preserve the Sephardic Halacha from Ashkenazi influence, and to restore it to what he considers its purest and most correct form.

== Rabbis and key figures ==
The most important and influential leader of present-day Sephardic Haredi community in Israel was Rabbi Ovadia Yosef, former Chief Rabbi of Israel and the spiritual leader of the Shas political party. He was considered the foremost religious authority by most Sephardic Yeshivas, especially large and influential ones such as Porat Yosef. In earlier periods, the key figures of the Sephardic Haredim included:

- Amram Aburbeh
- Solomon Eliezer Alfandari
- Ezra Attiya
- Sadqa Hussein
- Chaim Hezekiah Medini
- Yaakov Mutzafi
- Yaakov Chaim Sofer
