= December 1986 Birzeit University protests =

Student protests in the West Bank

- Part of Israeli–Palestinian conflict
- Date: 4 December 1986 – 16 December 1986
- Location: Birzeit University, West Bank, Palestine
- Caused by: Disruption to Birzeit University campus life due to an Israel Defence Forces roadblock; Anger over shooting of Palestinian demonstrators
- Goals: Dismantling of a roadblock blocking entrance to Birzeit University; An end to Israel Defense Forces harassment of students; An end to Israeli repression of Palestinian protests
- Methods: Sit-down protest, political demonstration, strike action, stone throwing
- Result: Protests end without any changes to Israeli policy; Birzeit University ordered shut by Israeli forces for 30 days

Parties
Palestinian university students	Israel Defense Forces

Casualties
- Deaths: 4 Palestinians

The December 1986 Birzeit University protests were a series of protests led by students at Birzeit University in the West Bank in December 1986.

Beginning as a sit-down protest against an Israeli roadblock that significantly impacted campus life, the protest soon spread across Palestine after the Israeli military shot and killed two of the protestors. Two more protestors would be killed by Israeli forces over the course of the demonstrations, both under the age of 18, and Birzeit University would be forcibly closed by Israeli forces until mid-January 1987. The protests also constituted one of the significant events in the mid-1980s that led to the outbreak of the First Intifada in December 1987.

== Background ==
After Israel's victory in the Six-Day War in 1967, Israel has occupied the Palestinian territories, including the West Bank. The occupation has been controversial, with Israel accused of violating international law, as well as committing human rights abuses and apartheid against West Bank Palestinians. The Israeli government has also actively promoted the creation and growth of Israeli settlements in the West Bank. The Palestine Liberation Organization, an umbrella group representing the most prominent armed Palestinian nationalist paramilitaries in the second half of the 20th century, has also been accused of a number of human rights violations and of waging a terrorist campaign against Israelis.

Birzeit University is a public university in Birzeit, a Palestinian Christian town near Ramallah in the West Bank. The university is considered one of the best universities in Palestine and the Middle East in international university rankings. In the 1980s, Birzeit University was the centre of a significant number of protests, strikes, and clashes between Palestinians and Israeli forces. The university was forcibly closed by the Israeli authorities for more a month on six different occasions between 1980 and 1985, and several of the university's professors were arrested and exiled during that period. On 21 November 1984, a student at the university named Sharif Khalil Taibe was shot and killed by the Israeli military while taking part in a demonstration in support of Palestinian Liberation Organisation leader Yasser Arafat.

== Events ==
=== Prelude ===
1986 was a tumultuous year for universities in Palestine due to the Israeli–Palestinian conflict, with less than half able to hold graduation ceremonies on schedule. Birzeit University was also hit by a faculty strike from 17 June to 8 September over wage cuts.

November 1986 saw a significant rise in tensions in the occupied Palestinian territories. On 15 November, a 22-year-old yeshiva student named Eliahu Amedi was stabbed in the Old City of Jerusalem, sparking a week and a half of violent anti-Arab protests by Israelis in Jerusalem. On 29 November, protests were staged across Palestine to mark the 39th anniversary of the United Nations Partition Plan for Palestine, with several protestors clashing with Israeli forces and throwing rocks at Israeli vehicles.

=== 4 December roadblock protests ===
Following the late-November protests in Palestine, the Israeli military erected a number of roadblocks across the West Bank to examine IDs, bags, and cars. The roadblock erected on the main road between Birzeit and Ramallah caused significant disruption to student life at Birzeit University, with students and professors being blocked from attending classes and entering their dormitories. Some students also complained of harassment from Israeli soldiers stationed at the roadblock, including insults and sexual innuendos.

On the morning of 4 December, with the roadblock still present, a number of students organised a sit-down protest in front of the roadblock to press for its removal. The protest was forcibly dispersed by the Israeli military, who threw tear gas at the students and arrested Birzeit University professor of history Saleh Abd al-Jawad in front of the students, accusing al-Jawad of trying to incite the students. Roger Heacock, another Birzeit history professor, disputed the accusation, saying that al-Jawad had warned the students not to throw stones. Heacock also accused the soldiers of violently arresting al-Jawad, saying that he had been "grabbed, throttled, kicked in the rear," and accused the soldiers of firing tear gas without warning. Heacock was subsequently briefly detained by the Israeli military.

The forced dispersal of the protest inflamed tensions on the university campus. Within a couple of hours, students began assembling in front of the university library to launch a second, larger protest. When the students began marching towards the roadblock, chanting nationalist and Palestinian Liberation Organisation slogans, Israeli soldiers used tear gas, water cannons, and rubber bullets to try and disperse the protest. When the soldiers failed, and the students began throwing stones at the soldiers in response, the soldiers opened fire with live ammunition. At least 11 students were seriously injured and 2 were killed. The killed students were Jawad Abu Selmi and Saeb Abu Dahhab, both 22 years old. At least seven students were arrested by Israeli forces.

When students tried to bring the injured to the Ramallah Hospital, Israeli soldiers at roadblocks delayed them. A further clash occurred at the hospital, when Israeli soldiers fired tear gas at students who attempted to block the soldiers from entering the hospital grounds.

=== 5 December shooting ===
Following the shootings, widespread protests broke out across Palestine and a general strike was declared in the West Bank.

On 5 December, a 14-year-old Palestinian boy was shot and killed in the Balata Camp, after an Israeli patrol opened fire on a group of children throwing rocks at them. An IDF spokesperson stated that the patrol had ordered the children to stop three times and then fired warning shots at their feet and over their heads, following IDF protocol. A 3-day mourning strike was declared in Ramallah and East Jerusalem in response to the shooting.

On 6 December, the Israeli government ordered Birzeit University to be closed until January to prevent further protests. That same day, at least 70 Palestinians were arrested after taking part in demonstrations and at least six Israelis were injured by stones.

=== 8 December shooting ===
On 8 December, a 12-year-old boy was shot dead by Israeli forces in the Balata Camp, the fourth person to be killed during the protests. Following the shooting, the Israeli military enacted a curfew on Balata to prevent further demonstrations. The Israeli government also ordered An-Najah National University to be temporarily closed. Six other Palestinians were injured on the 8. That same day, three Israeli children and a bus driver were injured in East Jerusalem after their bus windshield was smashed.

On 9 December 1000 Birzeit students and faculty members held a silent march between the new and old campuses of the university. That same day, at least 8 Palestinians protesting in the Gaza Strip were wounded by the Israeli military, while three Israeli civilians and one Israeli border officer in the West Bank were wounded after being hit by thrown stones.

On 10 December, Israeli newspaper Davar published an article claiming that the Israeli officer who perpetrated the 4 December shooting was "known to have extremist views close to the extremist settlers." The officer subsequently claimed that he had been "caught in an impossible position," and the IDF investigation into the shooting concluded without any disciplinary measures.

On 11 December, a 16-year Palestinian girl named Khadijeh Susi was shot in the arm by Israeli forces and injured after attempting to mobilise students at the al-Zahra School in Gaza for a protest. Another 16-year-old Palestinian was badly injured in the Bureij refugee camp on he 11th after being shot by Israeli forces. Four Palestinian protestors in the Dheisheh were arrested, and two at Bethlehem University. That day, a group of Israeli schoolchildren from the French Hill settlement were also reported to have thrown stones at a Palestinian. protest in Issawiya.

=== End of the protests ===
By 14 December, the protests had mostly subsided.

On 16 December, a demonstration at An-Najah National University after the university was allowed to re-open was quickly dispersed by Israeli forces. Students then briefly barricaded themselves inside the university buildings before quietly ending the demonstration.

== Reactions ==
=== In Palestine ===
The Birzeit University administration described the protests as "the worst incident of police brutality in university history." Birzeit biochemistry professor Nabeel Nahas described the students as "full of anger and sadness," adding that by the time the protests had subsided without producing a change in Israeli policies, the students were "like someone who has been hit on the head. They don't know what to do." Birzeit director of public relations Albert Aghazarian stated that students wanted to protest over issues affecting Palestine, but that "whenever the students want to express their feelings, the military sets up roadblocks," adding that "there has been a steady build-up of anger, humiliation, resentment, and frustration."

Khalid Salim of the Birzeit student union described the protests as "not the liberation of Palestine, but it is a chance to show people the real face of Israel." Robin Lustig of British newspaper The Observer interviewed a group of Birzeit students known as "Kit-Kats" for their wealthier-than-average backgrounds, supposed taste for imported chocolates, and preference of partying over politics, following the protests, who claimed that they were routinely harassed and taunted at Israeli checkpoints. One of the Kit-Kats stated that she had been sheltered in secondary school, but that "at Birzeit I have had to start facing the problems," adding that "I have started to hate these people. I really do hate them now." Another of the Kit-Kats stated that she tried "to avoid problems, but it gets to the point where you just can't take it anymore," saying that "I would like to be able to talk to some Israelis, but I know that the situation is going to get much worse. All they want is a chance to shoot us: it's simple hatred."

PLO-linked newspaper Al Fajr published an editorial describing the Israeli response to the protests as "wanton brutality," saying that "even in Paris, where hundreds of thousands - not dozens - of student demonstrators clogged the streets this week, police did not use live ammunition."

=== In Israel ===
Israeli Minister of Defence Yitzhak Rabin blamed the deaths on the Palestinian Liberation Organisation, saying that the PLO had incited the protests, and accused Palestinians of refusing "to accept Israel’s hand outstretched for peace, to sit around the negotiating table and reach peace." Prime Minister of Israel Yitzhak Shamir stated that "the nation should express its appreciation to the army and encourage it." Minister of Commerce and Industry Ariel Sharon argued that the only way to prevent future demonstrations was to increase Israeli settlement in the Palestinian territories. Chief of the Central Command General Ehud Barak stated that he had ordered an investigation into the 4 December shooting, but that it appeared as if the soldiers "did not fire unless there was a real danger, and then only after warning," saying that casualties from warning shots were "liable to happen. Even when troops purposely try to hit their legs, one can be wounded without anyone intending it when he bends, moves quickly, or someone else appears behind him."

Likud MK Uzi Landau called for Birzeit University to be permanently closed. Two non-confidence motions in the Israeli government overs its handling of the protests were debated in the Knesset, both being defeated.

Some left-wing anti-war activists in Israel reformed the Solidarity Committee for Birzeit University, which had been active in the early 1980s, in support of the protesting students. In Nazareth, 10 000 people participated in a demonstration in the Green Line on 14 December in solidarity with the Birzeit students, the largest protest inside the Green Line in four years. Biochemist and writer Yeshayahu Leibowitz stated that "whoever supports occupation agrees to bloodshed. The bloodshed will only stop when the occupation ends.

A demonstration was held at the Hebrew University of Jerusalem on 7 December in solidarity with the Birzeit students, being dispersed by police after clashes with right-wing counter-demonstrators. Five of the students involved in organising the Hebrew University solidarity demonstration were suspended by the university for their involvement. Another solidarity demonstration that day at Ben-Gurion University of the Negev in Beersheba was also dispersed by police, with three of the students demonstrating being arrested.

=== Internationally ===
The United Nations Security Council passed a resolution calling on the Israeli government to release protestors who had been detained and for all parties to exercise maximum restraint. 14 of the 15 members of the Security voted in favour of the resolution, with the United States abstaining. During the Security Council debate, Permanent Representative of the Soviet Union to the United Nations Alexander Belonogov accused Israel of committing genocide against Palestinians. Permanent Representative of Israel to the United Nations Benjamin Netanyahu denounced the American abstention, saying that "some may interpret it as a sign of weakness" and calling for "a reaffirmation of the traditional U.S. policy of firmness which has gained the U.S. the respect of many in the Arab world."

The Government of Egypt accused Israel of "violent repressive measures" in its response to the protests.

== Aftermath ==
Between 20 December 1986 and 20 January 1987, 24 students from Birzeit University were arrested for their political activities by Israeli forces, most of whom had at some point sat on the university student union council, and at least one of whom was arrested for possessing a poster of the two students killed on 4 December. Later that month, four students from the university who had been detained at Al-Fara'a Prison publicly accused Israeli forces of torturing them. On 12 January 1987, Birzeit professor Saleh Abd al-Jawad was sentenced to 39 days incarceration by an Israeli military court on charges of failing to cooperate with Israeli police during the 4 December sit-down protest.

On 21 January 1987, Israeli Minister of Defence Yitzhak Rabin held a meeting with the chairs of several universities in the West Bank to discuss rising tensions, in which he stated that the Israeli government didn't want to infringe on academic freedom but had to prevent universities from becoming sources of unrest. Birzeit University president Gabi Baramki afterwards claimed that Rabin had threatened to permanently close Palestinian universities if they didn't take steps to prevent their students from participating in political demonstrations. One Palestinian was arrested during Rabin's visit for throwing a stone at Rabin's convoy.

In the January 1987 Birzeit University student union elections, the leftist-nationalist bloc won 41,5% of the vote, with the Marxist bloc winning 24,5%, and the Islamist bloc winning 34%, a significant increase for the Islamist bloc that was paralleled by results in other Palestinian student union elections that year. The Islamist bloc claimed that the two students killed on 4 December had been supporters of their faction.

Tensions over the Israeli occupation of Palestine would continue to grow through 1987. Birzeit University would be forcibly closed by Israeli forces another three times in 1987, including one closure of four months between April and August. In December 1987, a mass wave of widespread demonstrations and strikes would erupt across the Palestinian territories, the beginning of the First Intifada. According to Mouin Rabbani of the Institute for Palestine Studies, demonstrations had become "frequent and particularly intense during late 1986 and the spring of 1987," and "university campuses and large towns became the focus of an escalating spiral of resistance" leading towards the First Intifada.
