= Eliezer Berland =

Israeli Orthodox Jewish rabbi, sex offender, and fraudster

Rabbi Eliezer Berland אליעזר ברלנד
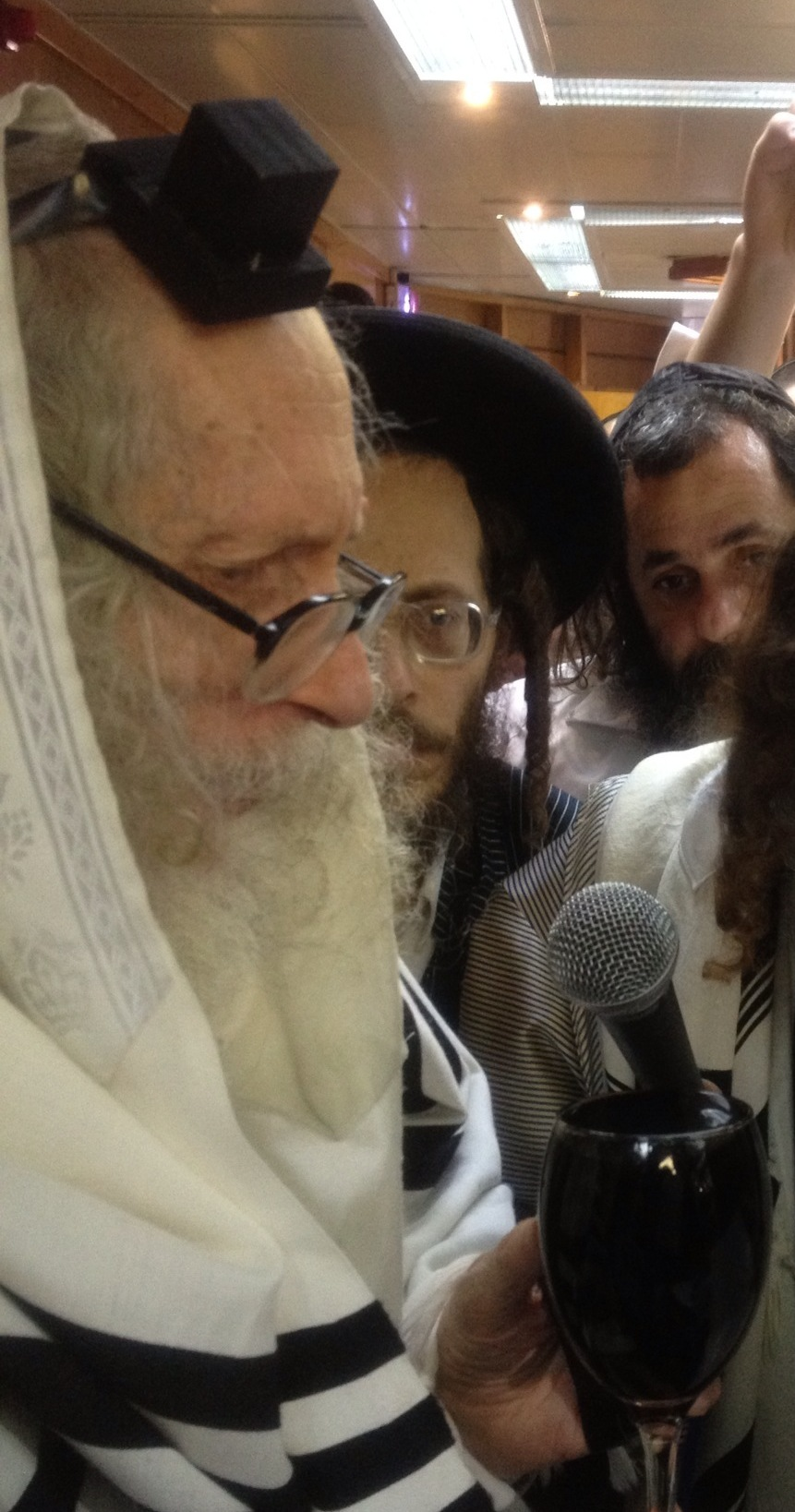

Personal life
- Born: December 26, 1937 (age 88) Haifa, Mandatory Palestine
- Spouse: Tehilla
- Education: Knesses Chizkiyahu

Religious life
- Religion: Judaism

Jewish leader
- Position: Rosh Yeshiva
- Yeshiva: Shuvu Bonim

Eliezer Berland (Hebrew: אליעזר ברלנד; born December 26, 1937) is an Israeli Orthodox Jewish rabbi, convicted sex offender and fraudster affiliated with the Breslov Hasidic movement in Israel. He is rosh yeshiva of Yeshivat Shuvu Bonim, also known as Yeshivat Nechamat Zion, in the Muslim Quarter of the Old City of Jerusalem. The movement is sometimes viewed as being a sect. Berland is a member of Vaad Olami D'Chasedai Breslov (World Committee of Breslov Chassidim), "the supervisory council for many Breslov activities."

Following allegations of sexual misconduct, Berland fled Israel, traveling from country to country to avoid extradition to Israel. He was eventually returned to Israel, where he confessed to having committed rape, and was sentenced to 18 months' incarceration for his sexual attacks on two women, as well as his instructions to assault the husband of one of the women he had sexually assaulted.

In June 2021, Berland received another 18-month prison sentence for fraud. A few months later, he became suspected of involvement in two murders.

== Biography ==
Berland was born in Haifa. He studied at the Knesses Chizkiyahu yeshiva in Kfar Hasidim under Rabbi Elyah Lopian and Rabbi Dov Yaffe. After his marriage, daughter of Knesset member Shalom-Avraham Shaki, Berland joined the Ponevezh Yeshiva kollel and, later, the Volozhin Kollel in Bnei Brak. It has been said that he was a chavruta (study partner) with Rabbi Yaakov Yisrael Kanievsky, known as the Steipler Gaon, though this has been disputed as members of Kanievsky's family deny this. Among his students is Rabbi Shalom Arush, rosh yeshiva of Chut Shel Chessed Yeshiva of Jerusalem.

== Controversies ==
Several women accused Berland of sexual harassment or rape. The assaults came to light in 2012 when the newspaper Israel Hayom reported an incident in which one of Berland's students encountered him at home standing beside a naked woman. His supporters expressed anger over the report, and the person who leaked the story to the media was later violently attacked.

After the police opened an investigation, Berland fled Israel, and spent time in the United States, Italy, and Switzerland. He then left for Morocco, settling in Marrakesh. Berland lived in Marrakesh for seven months and intended to establish a kehilla in Marrakesh, based on the Shuvu Banim yeshiva. Thousands of followers began travelling to Marrakesh to celebrate holidays and some took up residency. In November 2013, Berland and his students were ordered to leave Morocco by King Mohammed VI after a Moroccan newspaper published an article about the circumstances in which he fled Israel. Berland's followers claimed that the king was merely concerned for their safety, as they were Hasidic Jews living in a Muslim country. Berland is thought to have left Morocco for Cairo, Egypt. He reportedly bought tickets for multiple destinations to confuse pursuers and in the end chose Zimbabwe. From there, he allegedly took a flight to Johannesburg, South Africa, where he was taken in by a relative.

On April 14, 2014, the Chief Rabbi of South Africa, Warren Goldstein, called on the South African Jewish community not to shelter or support Berland. Berland then flew to Zimbabwe, reportedly in a private jet owned by a wealthy follower. He lived in an upscale hotel room in Bulawayo and led worship services for members of the small Zimbabwean Jewish community in a synagogue in the Bulawayo suburb of Khumalo. He was joined by some of his followers. He hired two attorneys in Israel due to the possibility of being forced to return to Israel if his options ran out. On April 7, 2014, police raided Berland's hotel room and found him with some followers from Israel. After it was established that his visitor's visa had expired, he was arrested and charged with remaining in Zimbabwe without a permit. He pleaded guilty before a magistrate judge and was remanded to custody. He was also reportedly questioned over the sexual assault allegations. A magistrate judge gave him a choice between paying a $200 fine or three months in prison and ordered him expelled. Berland paid the fine, and left for South Africa, returning to Johannesburg. There, he lived in hiding, and managed, with help from followers, to narrowly escape two attempts by police to detain him.

The South African Jewish Report featured the first interview of a student trying to defend Berland. He claimed there was a conspiracy against the rabbi due to religious persecution by a sectarian Israeli government. In September 2014, Berland left South Africa to the Netherlands and was arrested after arriving at Amsterdam Airport Schiphol on September 11.

Shortly after his detention, Berland was released. A Dutch court ruled against his extradition as there was no active arrest warrant for him in Israel. The Israeli police confirmed that he was only wanted for questioning. In an interview with Israeli media shortly after his release, Berland claimed that the police had told him the charges were nonsense. Israel and the Netherlands engaged in extradition talks over Berland. In the meantime, he was granted freedom of movement throughout the European Union.

After the court ruling, 300 supporters came to see him, and Berland hosted a reception for them on a Jewish-owned camping site on the island of Texel. The authorities evicted most of them, as the number of supporters rose over the site's capacity.

On December 1, 2014, Berland's extradition was further delayed by a Dutch court due to new evidence submitted by his defense.

On February 12, 2015, his extradition to Israel was ordered by a Dutch court. The decision to extradite him was in the hands of the Dutch Secretary for Justice, Klaas Dijkhoff. Berland's followers tried to install themselves in a camp in Susteren, but it was full. 250 people lodged in a vacant youth hostel in Oldebroek until the mayor ordered them to leave on May 3, 2015, because of inhumane conditions and fire hazards.

The ruling was appealed to the Dutch Supreme Court, which on June 30, 2015, said that Berland could be extradited to Israel.

On the night of October 18, 2015, Berland's followers entered Joseph's Tomb in Nablus, as requested by Berland from abroad. Their entry without security clearance required their rescue by the Israeli Army and was followed by arson of the Tomb by Palestinians.

On April 7, 2016, Berland was again arrested in South Africa. Preceding and following his arrest were mass prayer vigils and demonstrations. On March 22, 2016, facing arrest, Berland asked his followers to hold an all-night prayer vigil at the cave of the patriarchs in Hebron. Approximately 8,000 people attended the six-hour-long rally. Following his arrest, on April 25, hundreds of followers demonstrated outside the South African embassy in Ramat Gan against the "unlawful arrest of the Rabbi" and his being denied humanitarian rights in prison. On April 27, thousands of supporters once again held a mass prayer vigil at the cave of the patriarchs in Hebron.

On May 1, 2016, Rabbi Yitzchak Dovid Grossman visited Berland to "aid him and ease his conditions". While there, he spoke about Berland's prison conditions, saying he was being denied food and had not eaten in days. He spoke about this to the media to raise awareness; other rabbis, like Shalom Arush, followed suit and spoke to the media about Berland's condition.

On May 21, 2016, Grossman flew a second time to visit Berland, and apparently succeeded in making some kind of deal between Berland and the Israeli authorities in which Berland would turn himself in voluntarily.

On May 27, 2016, Berland released a letter and audio recording to his followers saying, "I decided to return to Israel".

After the 2022 Russian invasion of Ukraine Berland was banned from entering Ukraine for saying that the invasion was divine retribution against Ukraine's government for hindering members of his group from making a pilgrimage to the Ukrainian city of Uman; in 2023 he tried to cross into Ukraine by land from Romania but was denied entry and returned to Israel, reportedly in a private jet.

== Conviction and sentencing ==
On November 18, 2016, Berland was convicted by the Jerusalem Magistrate's Court after admitting to two counts of indecent acts and one assault. He was sentenced on November 22 to 18 months' imprisonment.

On February 12, 2017, Berland was taken to the hospital for an urgent operation. He was later released to house arrest because of his health.

== Formation of special Beth Din ==
At the request of many, a special Beth din (religious court) was convened to investigate the rumors that had come out against Berland, the leader of the Shuvu Bonim community. The beth din comprised three dayanim, and its goal was to adjudicate the manner in which everyone should conduct themselves. On June 24, 2019, this special court issued the following order regarding Berland: "To stop immediately all hatred, persecution, arguments and slander, in writing and in speech, and in all form of media and publication." The statement was signed by Moshe Sternbuch, Yitzchok Tuvia Weiss, and others.

On May 20, after months of collecting evidence and testimony, the beth din issued their final conclusive ruling. It described the content of the testimonies that they had heard as “untoward acts” and “very serious behaviors,” and they concluded that, “It is clear that according to the opinion of our holy teachings, anyone who violates the three cardinal sins and their derivatives, someone who values his soul must stay away from him [the violator] and one is obligated to act in this way.” The ruling also contained a paragraph warning that this is a serious issue since defenders of Berland have excused his behavior, even publishing books, claiming it is permitted for a Tzaddik to perform sins. The ruling continued, "These matters are considered complete heresy in the fundamentals of our religion. We must uproot and remove this heresy from within us."

== Fraud sentence ==
In February 2020, Berland was arrested for fraud after hundreds of people filed police complaints alleging that he had sold prayers and pills to desperate members of his community, promised to cure disabilities, and promised the family members of imprisoned people that their relatives would be freed soon. During the arrest raid, police seized dozens of boxes of powders and pills which he had marketed as "wonder drugs." Laboratory tests revealed them to be over-the-counter pain medication and candy. In June 2021, Berland was sentenced to 18 months in prison after pleading guilty to fraud in a plea bargain. The sentence included time served; he had spent a year in detention prior to being released to house arrest in February 2021. As he entered prison, a group of his supporters held a demonstration nearby.
