= Vibe Ish =

Israeli musical artist

Vibe Ish וייב איש
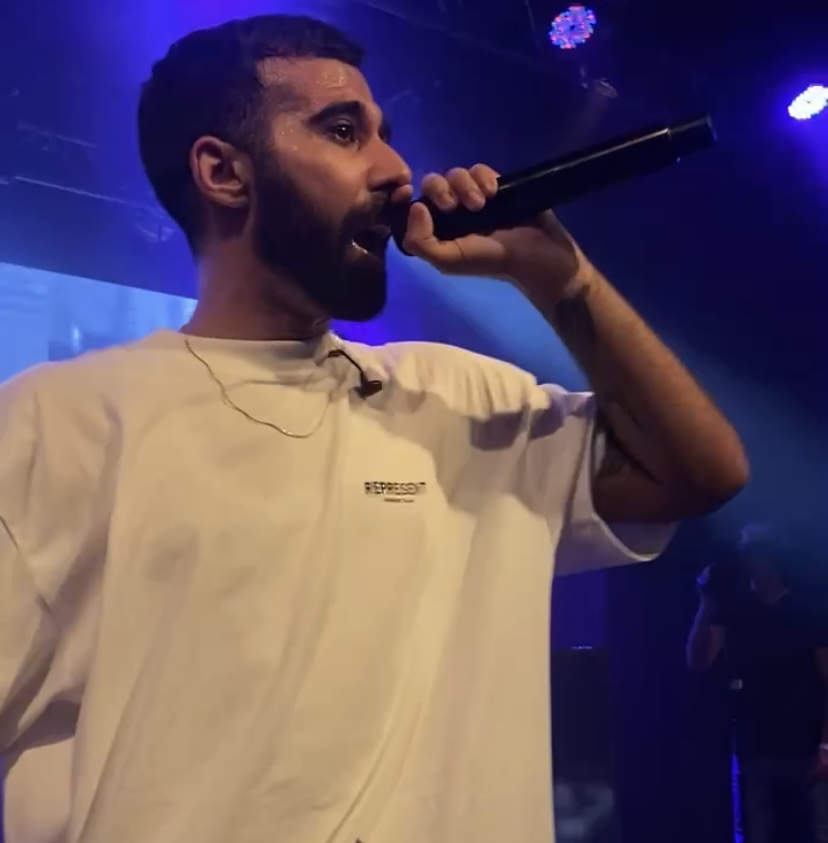

Background information
- Born: Or Shoshana; 17 January 1992 (age 34); Tel Aviv
- Genres: Israeli hip hop; Pop; pop rap
- Occupations: Singer; Rapper
- Years active: 2017–present
- Label: Helicon

Or Shoshana (Hebrew: אור שושנה; born January 17, 1992) known by the stage name Vibe Ish (Hebrew: וייב איש) is an Israeli singer-songwriter, composer and music producer.

== Biography ==
Shoshana was born in south Tel Aviv and grew up without a father. By the age of 17 he was frequenting open mics and free-styling at school.

In 2017 he began his musical journey in collaboration with rapper Ron Asael. The two founded the group "Tala Moveb". That same year they released their first self-titled album. The album was chosen by "The Sponge" magazine as the best rap album of 2017.

In 2019, he was a guest on Israeli hip-hop duo Shrek and Tsukush's album, "In my head", on the song "Adayin".

In 2020 he released his first solo album, "The Ascent". The album features guest appearances by Eden Derso, Michael Suisa, Teddy Ngosa and Yasmin Moalem, and was produced by DJ Mash and various producers. Later that year, she released the single "Julie" which samples Abigail Rose cover of the Ofra Haza song, "Oud Mechait La Ehad", which was included on the Haza tribute album "Kol HaNsema: Ofra Haza Sings".

The song was very successful and even entered the playlist of the Galgalat radio station.

In June 2021, he released the mixtape "Perfect Timing" with Tzukush. Her second solo album, "Iza Mazal", was released on March 16, 2023. In May 2022, he was a guest on Uri Shohat's album "Shochtoda" along with rappers Teddy Ngosa and Ravid Plotnik.

On November 20, 2023, he released the song "Lan" written in memory of Ido Peretz, who was killed in a Re'im music festival massacre.

In March 2024, he released a mini-album called "Outside", in which he featured singer-songwriter Dunedin, on his song Muse.

== Discography ==
=== Album ===
- 2025: מחכים לך שם
- 2024: בחוץ
- 2023: א י ז ה מ ז ל
- 2020: העלייה
- 2021: תזמון מושלם (with Tzukush (he)
- 2017: תלא מובב (with Ron Asael (he) as Tela Mobb)

== See also ==
- Israeli hip hop
- Music of Israel
- Ofer Levi
- Jonathan Mergui
