= Yair Elitzur =

Israeli musical artist

Yair Elitzur יאיר אליצור
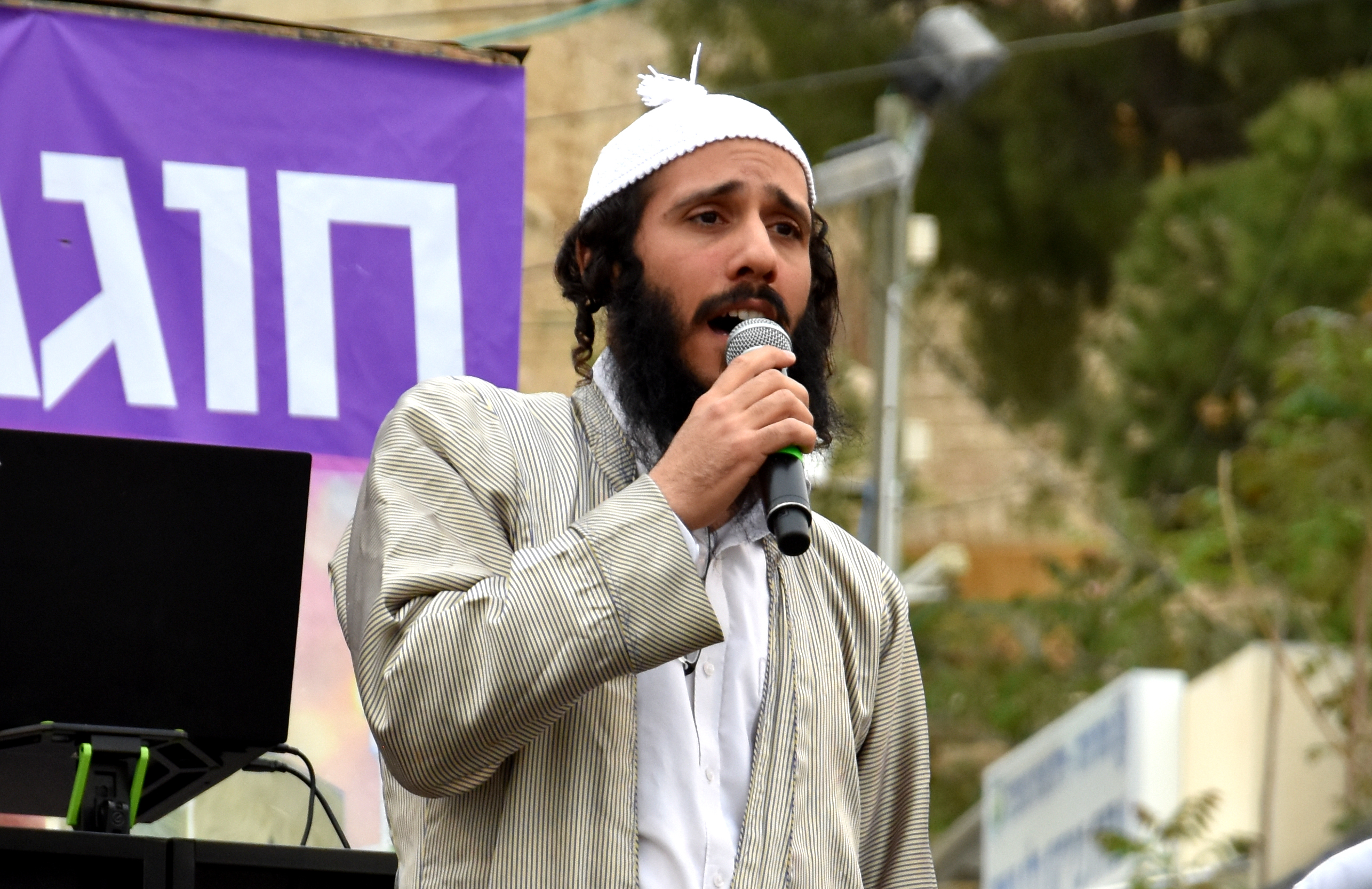

Background information
- Born: 28 March 1989 (age 37); Rehovot, Israel
- Occupations: Singer and songwriter
- Instruments: Guitar and piano
- Years active: 2011–present

Yosef Yair Elitzur (Hebrew: יאיר אליצור; born 28 March 1989), known by his stage name Yair Elitzur, is a rapper and singer belonging to the Breslov Hasidic sect.

== Early life and education ==
He was born in Rehovot to a nationally religious family of Persian origin. His father, Shlomi, is a musician by profession, and his mother is a kindergarten teacher by profession. He served in the Israel Defense Forces at the Tel Aviv headquarters as a commander Head of the Office of Communications and Intelligence.

When he was between the ages of 15 and 20, he came out and returned to religious life during his military service, following his rabbi, Rabbi Shalom Arush's book, "The Garden of Faith". He has been a member of Breslov Hasidism ever since. He began singing at 14 but has also worked in media, hosting a radio show on Campus Voice and as a field reporter for Channel 10.

== Style ==
Elizur sings in classical, rap and hip-hop styles. Following his conversion, he often speaks in his poems about it, the values of Judaism, and the meaning of life, with the aim of encouraging others to do the same. Among his songs, one can find lyrics characteristic of Breslov Hasidism, such as "Loneliness," "Father, I Love You," and similar songs.

== Music career ==
At the age of 14, he began his career as a rapper and performed in several clubs. During this time, he joined the band Sesame Street and released the songs "Yona's Wings," "Operation 101," "In Honor of Nevo," "Kohav," and "You'll Be Back".

At the age of 15, Elitzur produced the "Happy Days" line, which featured performances by a variety of Israeli rappers, including Fishy the Big, Shay 360, Noa Faran, Nechi Nechi, Tuna, Roy Edri, the Takt Family, Subliminal, which took place at the Gispot and Sublime clubs. Over the years, he has made notable collaborations with rappers Tuna and Ravid Plotnik, for whom he wrote the song "Ravid." After his conversion, in November 2016 he began recording his debut album, "In Another Place in the World," which was recorded at Sayyata Deshmia Studios. Adapted by Lior Moshe.

In April 2017, Elitzur released the song "Run After You," which became a hit and was covered by many. The song played on Galgalatz and other radio stations, and with the covers, it reached around 13 million views. In 2018, he released four more songs: "Free and Happy," "I Asked Why," "David's Brother," and "Somewhere Else in the World."

In February 2021, he released the song "No Return to the Streets," which became a hit among the ultra-Orthodox religious public and received one million views on YouTube. The clip won fifth place in the "Clip of the Year" category at the Kikar Hashabbat website's "People of the Year in Music 2011" parade. She then released the song "The Keys of the Shackles".

In November 2023, he released the song "No Comfort," which deals with the War of the Iron Sword and the return of the abductees. In June 2024, he released the song "Tamid Ohev Oti." Written with his rabbi, Rabbi Shalom Arush, with the words: "May God, blessed be He, always love me, and I will always have only good, and even better, and even better".

The song became a viral phenomenon on the internet. Singers Sasson Ifram Shaulov, Kobi Peretz, and Itzik Dadia released versions of the song, with Shaulov version receiving greater exposure than theirs. The song won year-end charts on Haredi radio stations and topped the Hitlist, the official Galgalatz chart, and other charts for several weeks. The song has over 29 million views on YouTube. Many rabbis, scholars, and journalists have criticized the poem's worldview.

Later that same December, he released the single "Tate T'tahar," the first episode of Eleazar new web series, "Yerushalim 02." The single reached number nine on the official Galgalatz chart, and in January, Elizur released a duet version of the song with Ben Tzur.

== Personal life ==
Elitzur is married to Leah and they have five daughters. He lives in the Beit Israel neighborhood of Jerusalem.
