= Sasson Ifram Shaulov =

Israeli musical artist

Sasson Ifram Shaulov ששון איפרם שאולוב
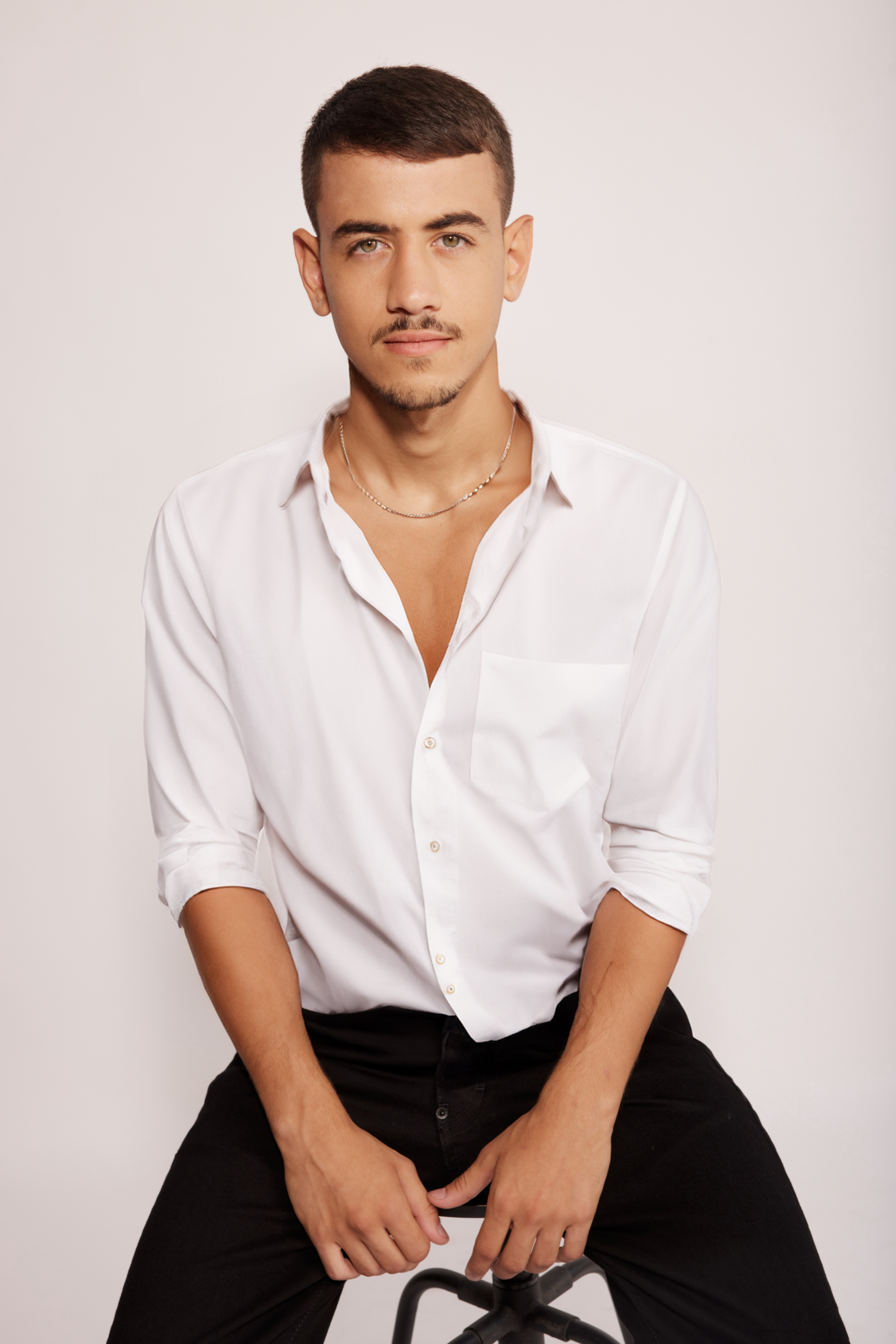

Background information
- Born: 15 June 2002 (age 24); Haifa, Israel
- Occupations: Singer and songwriter
- Instruments: Guitar and piano
- Years active: 2021–present

Sasson Ifram Shaulov (Hebrew: ששון איפרם שאולוב; born 15 June 2002) is an Israeli singer and songwriter.

== Early life and education ==
Shaulov was born in the Bat Galim neighborhood of Haifa, the youngest of three children, to Samira, a caregiver, and Alexei, a welder. His family origins on both sides are Mountain Jewish. His parents divorced when he was young, and he was raised by his mother.

He completed his primary education at the "Aliya" school and studied until tenth grade at the Municipal Secondary School A, specializing in theater. Shaulov was released from military service by decision of the Military Police and volunteered for national service on several fronts.

For years, he worked as a gas station attendant and made coffee at train stations, positions he held until 2023.

== Music career ==
Over the years, he tried several times to audition for The Next Star and The X Factor, but failed at the audition stage. He began his journey on the social media platform TikTok, where he posted covers of various songs.

On 15 June 2021, he released a cover of the song "Malka Sheli" by the musical group Karakokli. On 30 January 2022, he released the single "Not Tonight," a cover of a Dudu Tsa song. On 12 April, he released the single "I've Been Waiting for You & How Are You Going," a mashup of songs by Rinat Bar and Eden Ben Zaken. On 11 August, he released his second original single, "From Thoughts," which was also successful and reached number 60 on the Hitlist.

On 30 January 2023, he released the single "Something Real in the Eyes," which was Shaulov breakthrough hit and reached the top five on the charts. On 30 May, he released the single "Together with Me," which was also a hit and reached number 40 on the Billboard Hot 100.

On 28 August, he released the single "When the Summer Is Over," which reached number 12 on the chart. On 27 September, he released the single "Let's Talk," which was his second song to enter the top ten on the chart, peaking at number six. On 22 January 2024, he released the single "My Blood" featuring singer Odeya. On 18 February, Shaulov released a song called "Empty Streets," which is the first track from his upcoming mini-album. Two days later, on 20 February, he released the song "How Good We Are," and on 22 February, he released the singles "Where Are You?" and "Part of Me." On 29 February, he released the single "Queen of My Dreams" by Ben Chen.

On 17 April, he released the single "A Life Like This." On 9 May, he released the single "You." On 21 July, he released the single "Dumb." His debut album, "Crazy Paradise," was released on 11 August 2024.

On 12 September 2024, "Broken Heart," his duet with Eden Hason, was released. A few days later, he released the single "Always Love Me," a cover of a Yair Elitzur song. The song became a hit and reached number one on Hitlist, Israel official music chart on the Mako Hitlist website, in October of that year. On 29 October, the song "My Father Has a Ladder" was released, featuring Amir Benayoun of the Wetan Shikanu project. On 26 November, the song "I Moved Forward" was released, featuring Itay Levi.

On 2 March 2025, his second album, "Always Happy," was released.

== Personal life ==
Shaulov lives in Ramat Gan. He added the middle name "Ifram" as an additional surname at the age of 16.
