= Shuvu Bonim =

School in Jerusalem

Shuvu Bonim Yeshiva

Location
- Rehov Hebron 32; Old City; Jerusalem; 31.77764°N 35.23272°E

Information
- Established: 1978
- Rosh Yeshiva: Eliezer Berland
- Affiliation: Judaism

Shuvu Bonim (also Yeshivat Breslov—Nechamat Tzion) is a yeshiva in the Old City of Jerusalem with 1,500 students. It was founded in 1978 in Bnei Brak by Rabbi Eliezer Berland, a convicted sex offender and fraudster who is still the rosh yeshiva. The yeshiva was declared a cult by The Israeli Center for Cult Victims in 2018.

It is a Breslov yeshiva based on the teachings of Nachman of Breslov. About 30 percent of the student body is affiliated with the Haredi or national–religious communities. In 1980, an additional branch was opened in the Muslim Quarter of the Old City of Jerusalem. In 1982 the two branches merged into a single institution with the Bnei Brak yeshiva moving to Jerusalem.

It runs ten kollels, three yeshivot for young men, a Talmud Torah, an elementary school for girls, a range of preschools and kindergartens, youth groups, and evening lectures for women.

The relation with other Breslov branches during the New Year pilgrimage to Uman, Ukraine, has been tense.

== See also ==
- Jewish fundamentalism
