= Shalom Arush =

Israeli rabbi

Rabbi Shalom Arush שלום ארוש
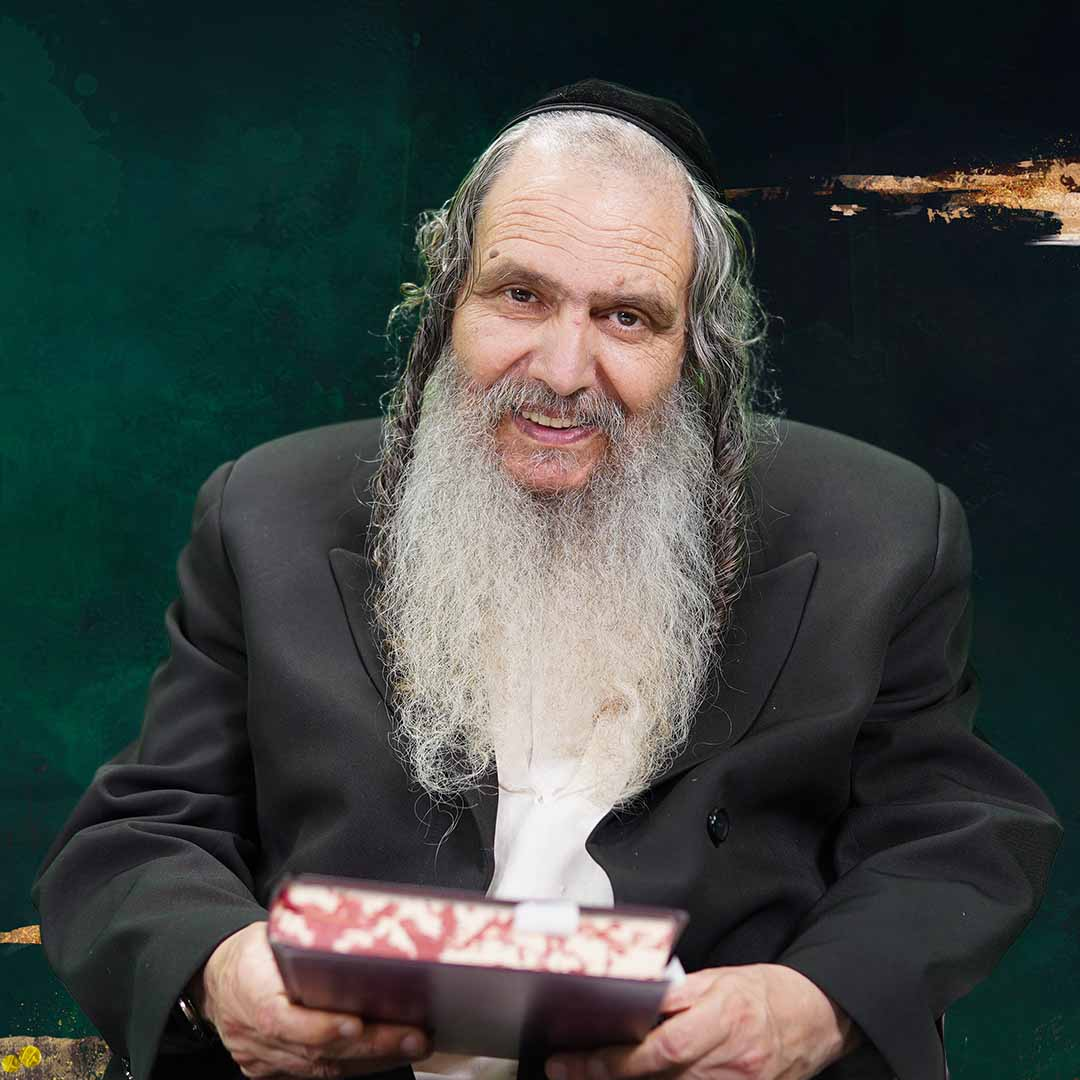
- Arush in 2022

Personal life
- Born: 15 April 1952 (age 74) Beni Mellal, Morocco
- Education: Shuvu Bonim; Tel Aviv University

Religious life
- Religion: Judaism
- Yeshiva: Chut Shel Chessed
- Position: Rosh Yeshiva
- Organisation: Chut Shel Chessed Institutions
- Residence: Jerusalem, Israel
- Semikhah: Breslov

Shalom Arush (Hebrew: שלום ארוש) is an Israeli rabbi and the founder of Chut Shel Chessed Institutions.

Arush works to spread the teachings of Rabbi Nachman of Breslov, both among Jews and non-Jews, through books and spoken performances. In his lessons, he consistently emphasizes the importance of faith and joy, which form the foundation of Breslov Hasidism.

Arush is the composer of the song "Tamid Ohev Oti", which gained popularity after it was released by Yair Elitzur in 2024.

== Personal life ==
Arush was one of nine children born to his parents in the town of Beni Mellal, Morocco. He learned in the local Jewish Alliance school and studied Hebrew in the evenings. His eldest brother married and immigrated to Israel before the rest of the family; Arush, his parents, and other siblings immigrated to Israel when he was 13.

The family settled in Petah Tikva, where his parents enrolled Arush in a state-religious school; he later attended a secular high school. In 1970 he joined the Israel Defense Forces as an airborne combat medic, taking part in many missions, including missions during the Yom Kippur War in 1973. During that time, five of his closest friends were killed in a helicopter crash while carrying out an army mission. This event was the catalyst for his religious transformation. Following his army service, Arush majored in economics at Tel Aviv University. He was introduced to his wife, Miriam, on a shidduch, and the newlyweds moved to Moshav Chazon Yechezkel. Later he moved to Bnei Brak to join Berland's new yeshiva there, and when the yeshiva moved to Jerusalem, he and his family followed.

== Career ==
Arush attended several yeshivot before meeting Eliezer Berland, who appointed Arush as his personal assistant and protégé. Arush also studied with Levi Yitzchok Bender and Shmuel Shapira.

In 1985, upon the directive of Berland, Arush opened his own yeshiva, Chut Shel Chessed. Initially he had 15 students; a year later, he had 80 students and the yeshiva moved to its present quarters in the Musrara neighborhood of Jerusalem.

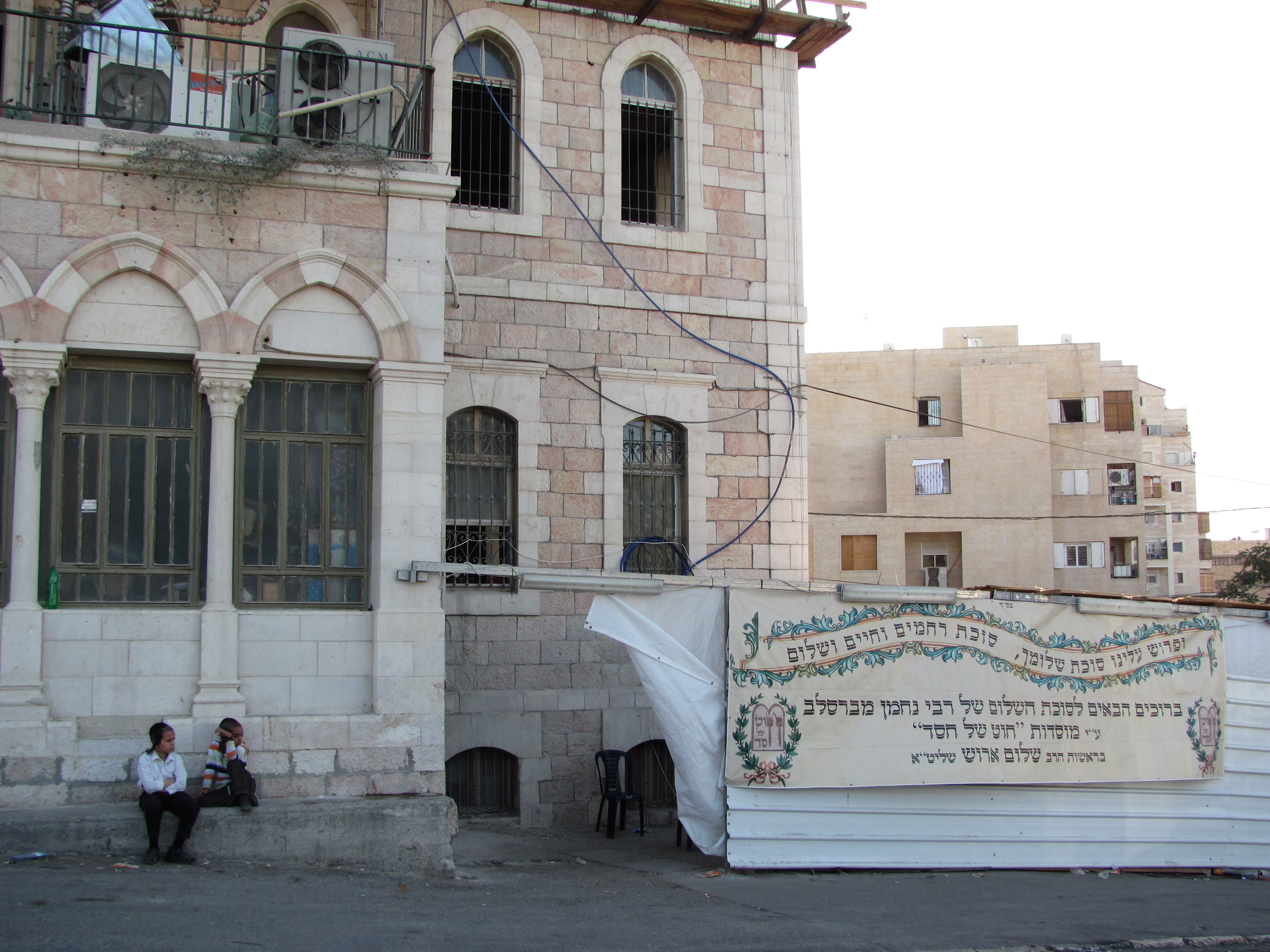
The Chut Shel Chessed yeshiva building on Shmuel HaNavi Street in Jerusalem, with its Sukkah.

Today, Chut Shel Chessed Institutions includes an elementary school, a high school, a yeshiva, and a kollel. According to the school, it "has built a reputation for helping hundreds of people from some of the worst situations to dramatically turn their lives around. Some students have become well-respected rabbis in their own rights, while others have become some of Israel’s top writers, actors and musicians." Alumni include actor Shuli Rand. Yair Elitzur has said that Arush inspired his hit single Tamid Ohev Oti (2024).

In 1998 Arush opened a branch of Chut Shel Chesed in Ashdod and appointed Lazer Brody to head its rabbinic ordination program. In 2006, the Ashdod branch merged with the Jerusalem yeshiva and Brody became its mashpia (spiritual guide), as well as the translator of Arush's books into English.

Arush has continued to support Berland throughout his trial and conviction for multiple rapes, as well as a separate conviction for fraud and an ongoing murder investigation. Brody left Arush in 2019 and now follows Naftali Moskowitz of Ashdod.

== Works ==
Arush has authored many works, which have been translated from Hebrew into English, Spanish, French, Russian, German, Portuguese, and Yiddish. Brody claims that, combined, they have sold more than a million copies. His works available in English are:

- Garden of Yearning: The Lost Princess (2007)
- Garden of Peace: A Marital Guide for Men Only (2008) ISBN 978-5-495-32106-9
- Garden of Emuna (2009) ISBN 978-1-59526-636-1
- Garden of Riches: A Guide to Financial Success (2021)
- In Forest Fields: A Unique Guide to Personal Prayer (2022)
- Women's Wisdom: Garden of Peace for Women (2023)
- Garden of Gratitude (2023)
