= Lithuania–Palestine relations =

- Lithuania: Palestine

Diplomatic mission
- Representative office, Ramallah: General delegation, Helsinki

Lithuania–Palestine relations refer to the bilateral relations between Lithuania and the State of Palestine. While Lithuania has not formally recognized Palestinian statehood, it supports a two-state solution to the Israeli–Palestinian conflict.

Lithuania has established a representative office in Ramallah, in the West Bank. Palestine also maintains a mission to Lithuania, although its head resides in Helsinki, Finland. As of early 2025, eight Palestinian citizens were living in Lithuania.

Lithuania has accredited an ambassador to the Arab League, of which Palestine is a member. Economic and cultural cooperation is also being developed.

== History ==
Although Lithuanian nobles may have undertaken pilgrimages to Palestine much earlier, the traveler Steponas Pliateris is known to have visited Palestine between 1825 and 1834.

In May 2009, three Palestinian Authority Electoral Commission representatives travelled to Lithuania to observe the presidential election, participate in training sessions, and meet with officials from relevant institutions.

On 16 December 2009, Vygaudas Ušackas became the first Lithuanian Foreign Minister to visit Palestine, where he met with leaders of the Palestinian Authority. On 15–16 June 2010, Palestinian Foreign Minister, Riyad al-Maliki, reciprocated with a visit to Lithuania, where he met with Foreign Minister Audronius Ažubalis, the chairman of the Seimas Committee on Foreign Affairs, and the Prime Minister's chancellor.

On 30 March 2010, Nabil Darwish al-Wazir, head of the Palestinian Authority's general delegation in Helsinki, visited Vilnius, where he met with Lithuania's deputy minister of foreign affairs to discuss the Israeli–Palestinian peace process.

On 29 November 2012, Lithuania abstained from voting on UN General Assembly Resolution 67/19, which granted Palestine non-member observer status at the United Nations.

In 2013, bilateral relations intensified. On 19 May, that year, Lithuanian Foreign Minister Linas Linkevičius visited Palestine, where he met with his counterpart, Riyad al-Maliki. During the visit, Linkevičius supported the two-state solution and emphasized the importance of "resuming peace talks between Israel and Palestine." On 15 July 2013, Lithuania established a liaison office in Ramallah. In 2016, the Palestinian Mission in Finland accredited a Head of Mission to Lithuania. High-level visits have taken place between Palestinian and Lithuanian officials. In October 2013, Palestinian President Mahmoud Abbas made his first official visit to Vilnius. Lithuanian Prime Minister Algirdas Butkevičius visited Palestine in September 2015, followed by President Dalia Grybauskaitė in October of the same year.

On 18–19 February 2016, bilateral political consultations between Lithuania and Palestine were held in Vilnius. On 19 September 2016, Lithuanian Foreign Minister Linas Linkevičius met with his Palestinian counterpart, Riyad al-Maliki, in New York City to discuss bilateral cooperation, the Middle East peace process, and regional developments.

In spring 2018, activists supporting Palestinian statehood and opposing the Lithuanian government's policy on Palestine launched the website Palestina.lt. Between 2018 and 2021, the group organized three protests against Israeli policies.

On 11–12 January 2021, Bertas Venckaitis, Head of the Lithuanian Representative Office in Palestine, met with Palestinian Prime Minister Mohammad Shtayyeh and Deputy Foreign Minister Amal Jadou. On 18 March, he met with Minister of Culture Atef Abu Saif to discuss cultural cooperation between the two countries. On 28 March, he held talks with Minister of Women's Affairs Amal Hamad. On 9 June, he met again with Amal Jadou to discuss bilateral cooperation.

On 27 October 2023, Lithuania abstained from voting on a UN General Assembly resolution calling for an immediate ceasefire in the Gaza war. It maintained the same position on a similar resolution adopted on 12 December 2023. On 10 May 2024, Lithuania abstained from voting on another UN General Assembly resolution that upgraded Palestine's status as an observer state in the United Nations.

== Calls for recognition ==
In December 2011, MP Egidijus Klumbys proposed a draft resolution recommending that the Seimas "recognize the independent State of Palestine within the 1967 borders." Klumbys and other supporting MPs noted that, on 29 November 2011, Iceland had become the first Western European country to recognize Palestine as an "independent state within the 1967 borders".

In April 2025, Lithuanian Foreign Minister Kęstutis Budrys stated that Lithuania is monitoring proposals by France and could recognize a Palestinian state, but only 'at the right time'.

In August 2025, a senior advisor to President Gitanas Nausėda stated that "at this time, the question of recognising Palestine is not on our agenda."

== Cultural cooperation ==
On 28 October 2021, the Lithuanian and Polish Representative Offices organized a commemoration in Ramallah to mark the 230th anniversary of the Constitution of 3 May 1791. The event included a presentation on the history and culture of the Lithuanian Tatars. Distinguished guests from Palestine attended, including the Palestinian Minister of Culture Atef Abu Saif, Minister of Education Marwan Awartani, Deputy Minister of Foreign Affairs Amal Jadou, diplomats, clergy, municipal leaders, and over 200 representatives from the political, business, academic, and cultural sectors. Additionally, the history and culture of the Lithuanian Tatars were also presented in Hebron.

Lithuania has been implementing development cooperation projects in Palestine since 2009. Between 2009 and 2020, the Development Cooperation and Democracy Promotion Programme carried out ten projects in Palestine, totaling €101,100. These projects focused on strengthening democratic and civil society, non-formal education, and women's economic empowerment.

In 2021, three projects targeting women's economic empowerment were implemented, receiving €25,400 in funding. In 2022, an additional three projects in this area received €113,614.

== Humanitarian aid ==
Since the 2014 Gaza war, Lithuania has donated a total of €467,000 in humanitarian aid for the Palestinian people, both in Palestine and abroad.

Between 2014 and 2020, Lithuania contributed €170,000 to the United Nations Relief and Works Agency for Palestine Refugees in the Near East (UNRWA). In 2020, it provided an additional €17,000 to the International Committee of the Red Cross (ICRC). In 2023, Lithuania donated €130,000 to UNRWA and €150,000 to the United Nations Office for the Coordination of Humanitarian Affairs (OCHA).

== Economic relations ==
In 2023, trade between Lithuania and Palestine totaled €1.99 million. Lithuania exported goods worth €1.99 million to Palestine, making it the country's 132nd largest export destination. Imports from Palestine amounted to just €0.4 thousand, ranking it as Lithuania's 178th largest import source. In 2023, Palestinian direct investment in Lithuania amounted to €0.06 million, while there was no recorded Lithuanian direct investment in Palestine.

Year	2016	2017	2018	2019	2020	2021	2022	2023
Total trade value (millions, EUR)	0.53	0.82	1.03	1.16	2.20	2.54	2.87	1.99
Export to Palestine (millions, EUR)	0.53	0.82	1.03	—N/a	—N/a	—N/a	—N/a	1.99
Import from Palestine (thousands, EUR)	0.0	0.0	0.0	—N/a	—N/a	—N/a	—N/a	0.40

== Resident diplomatic missions ==
- Lithuania is accredited to Palestine through its Representative Office in Ramallah.
- Palestine is accredited to Lithuania through its General Delegation in Helsinki.

== See also ==
- Foreign relations of Lithuania
- Foreign relations of Palestine
- International recognition of Palestine
