= Ibrahim Kharman =

Palestinian businessman

- إبراهيم خرمان
- Born: Ibrahim Kharman إبراهيم خرمان; Jerusalem
- Education: Northwestern University

Ibrahim Kharman is a Palestinian businessman. He is the Deputy CEO of the Palestine Telecommunications Group (Paltel) and the Chief Commercial Officer of Paltel Group. The Palestinian Communications Group is a public shareholding company established in 1995 in the Palestinian Autonomous Areas of the Palestinian National Authority It is the largest employer (after the government) in Palestine.

== Early life and education ==
He obtained a master's degree in executive business administration from Northwestern University, and a bachelor's degree in electrical engineering from Birzeit University.

== Career ==
Kharman held the position of Acting General Manager of the Palestinian Telecommunications Company, and was appointed after six months by the Board of Directors as Deputy CEO of the Communications Group. He also held the position of Director of Marketing for Paltel since 2010, and worked with the marketing team to achieve many achievements over the years. The most recent of which was the launch of Paltel Giga Fiber service, which is an internet service via home fiber optic technology, which provides Palestinian homes with speeds of up to 1000 megabytes.
