= Shahwani =

Shahwani is a Baloch tribe, derived from the Arabic term shahwānī (شهواني), which means 'luxurious', 'voluptuous', 'sensual', 'full' or 'loaded'. Notable people with the surname include:

- Malik Naseer Ahmed Shahwani, Pakistani politician
- Mohammed Abdullah al-Shahwani (born 1938), Iraqi general
- Muhammad Yousaf Shahwani (born 1971), Pakistani politician
- Nawab Muhammad Khan Shahwani, Pakistani politician
- Zeenat Shahwani, Pakistani politician

== See also ==
- Shahwan
- Chahuán
- Brahui people
