= Chahuán =

Chahuán is a Spanish transliteration of the Arabic surname Shahwān (شهوان), related to the term shahwānī (شهواني), which means 'luxurious', 'voluptuous', 'sensual', 'full' or 'loaded'. Notable people with the surname include:

- Francisco Chahuán (born 1971), Chilean lawyer and politician
- Nicolás Chahuán Nazar (died 1988), founder of football club Unión La Calera

== See also ==
- Nicolás Chahuán Nazar Municipal Stadium, La Calera, Chile
- Cornet Chahwan, Lebanon
- Shahwan
- Shahwani
