= Elections in Palestine =

Elections in Palestine are held sporadically. Elections for the Palestinian National Authority were held in Palestinian Autonomous areas from 1994 until their transition into the State of Palestine in 2013. Elections were scheduled to be held in 2009, but was postponed because of the Fatah–Hamas conflict. President Mahmoud Abbas agreed to stay on until the next election, but he was recognized as president only in the West Bank and not by Hamas in Gaza. The Palestinian National Authority has held several elections in the Palestinian territories, including elections for president, the legislature and local councils. The Palestinian National Authority has a multi-party system, with numerous parties. In this system, Fatah is the dominant party.

The first legislative and presidential elections were held in 1996; the first local elections in January–May 2005. Previous (failed) Legislative Council elections were held in 1923 under the British Mandate, and previous municipal elections were held in 1972 and 1976, organized by the Israeli government.

The Palestinian Legislative Council passed a law in June 2005 (signed by Abbas on 13 August 2005), to increase the number of members from 88 to 132, with half to be elected using proportional representation and half by plurality-at-large voting in traditional constituencies. The January 2005 presidential election was won by Abbas of Fatah, while the January 2006 legislative election was won by Hamas. In 2007, a presidential decree abolished the constituency seats with all seats to be elected from a national list, and prohibited parties which did not acknowledge the Palestine Liberation Organization's right to represent the Palestinian people (specifically Hamas) from contesting the election. An opinion poll suggested that a majority of Palestinians supported the change, while Hamas called it illegal.

== Importance of the elections ==
Elections in the Palestinian Authority are held to exercise the Palestinian right to self-determination in connection with their right to establish their own state, but are held under military occupation. They are held in the framework of the Oslo Accords, meaning that the power of the Palestinian National Authority was (and is) limited to matters such as culture, education, ID-cards, and the distribution of land and water as per the Oslo Interim Agreement. (Note: From the Oslo II-accord: Article I: 1. Israel shall transfer powers and responsibilities as specified in this Agreement ... Israel shall continue to exercise powers and responsibilities not so transferred.; Article IX: 5 a. In accordance with the DOP, the Council will not have powers and responsibilities in the sphere of foreign relations, which sphere includes the establishment abroad of embassies, consulates or other types of foreign missions and posts or permitting their establishment in the West Bank or the Gaza Strip, the appointment of or admission of diplomatic and consular staff, and the exercise of diplomatic functions. 5 b. ... the PLO may conduct negotiations and sign agreements with states or international organizations for the benefit of the Council in the following cases only: 1. economic agreements ...; 2. agreements with donor countries for the purpose of implementing arrangements for the provision of assistance to the Council; 3. agreements for the purpose of implementing the regional development plans ...; 4. cultural, scientific and educational agreements.)

In October 2007, 2 ex-ministers and 45 PLC members were in Israeli detention. In July 2012, there were 4,706 Palestinian prisoners in Israeli prisons. Of these, 22 were PLC members, of which 18 were in administrative detention. The November 2013 figures of Addameer give about 5,000 prisoners imprisoned by Israel, of which 14 are members of the Palestinian Legislative Council (10 PLC members in administrative detention).

Hamas announced its intention to once again boycott local elections and has repeatedly prevented free, local elections since it first took power of Gaza in 2006.

== In the Gaza Strip ==
Following the Fatah–Hamas conflict that started in 2006, Hamas formed a government ruling the Gaza Strip without elections. Gazan Prime Minister Haniyye announced in September 2012 the formation of a second Hamas government, also without elections.

The first elections in the Gaza Strip after the Hamas coup took place in 2026 as a part of the 2026 Palestinian local elections amidst the ongoing Gaza war. While in the West Bank many of the Fatah candidates ran unchallenged, competition took place in the Gaza Strip city Deir al-Balah, chosen as a city which was still unoccupied by Israel and which suffered from less destruction than many parts of Gaza reduced to rubble, with many residents displaced by Israel. Despite the previous objection to the elections, this time Hamas was not intervening in the process. The Deir al-Balah candidates were running on four nominally nonpartisan lists, and Hamas has formally declined participation; however, one of the lists was seen as aligned with Hamas, while the other one as with Fatah or with Fatah dissidents. The former won only 2 seats out of 15, while the latter took 6; the rest were won by candidates of the other 2 lists.

== Parliamentary elections ==
=== 1996 parliamentary elections ===
At the 1996 general election, Fatah won 55 of the 88 seats from multi-member constituencies, with the number of representatives from each constituency determined by population. Some seats were set aside for the Christian and Samaritan communities. 51 seats were allocated to the West Bank, 37 to the Gaza Strip. Five out of 25 female candidates won a seat.

Party	Votes	%	Seats
Fatah	1,085,593	30.90	50
Palestinian People's Party	102,830	2.93	0
National Democratic Coalition	79,058	2.25	1
Palestinian Democratic Union	71,672	2.04	1
Liberty & Independence Bloc	57,516	1.64	1
Palestinian Popular Struggle Front	26,034	0.74	0
Arab Liberation Front	22,810	0.65	0
Islamic Struggle Movement	12,285	0.35	0
Islamic Jihad Movement	8,391	0.24	0
National Democratic Movement	6,831	0.19	0
Future Bloc	6,584	0.19	0
Palestinian Liberation Front	3,919	0.11	0
National Movement for Change	2,658	0.08	0
Palestinian National Coalition	2,635	0.08	0
Ba'ath Party	2,230	0.06	0
Progressive National Bloc	1,707	0.05	0
Independents	2,020,213	57.51	35
Total	3,512,966	100.00	88

=== 2006 parliamentary elections ===
At the 2006 legislative election, six parties and 4 independents won seats. Change and Reform (i.e., Hamas) won 44.45% of the vote and 74 seats, while Fatah won 41.43% of the vote and 45 seats.

Party	Proportional			District			Total seats
Party	Votes	%	Seats	Votes	%	Seats	Total seats
Hamas	440,409	44.45	29	1,932,168	40.82	45	74
Fatah	410,554	41.43	28	1,684,441	35.58	17	45
Popular Front for the Liberation of Palestine	42,101	4.25	3	140,074	2.96	0	3
The Alternative (Palestine)	28,973	2.92	2	8,216	0.17	0	2
Palestinian National Initiative	26,909	2.72	2	0	0.00	0	2
Third Way (Palestinian political party)	23,862	2.41	2	0	0.00	0	2
Palestinian Popular Struggle Front	7,127	0.72	0	8,821	0.19	0	0
Palestinian Arab Front	4,398	0.44	0	3,446	0.07	0	0
Palestinian Liberation Front	3,011	0.30	0	0	0.00	0	0
National Coalition for Justice and Democracy	1,806	0.18	0	0	0.00	0	0
Palestinian Justice	1,723	0.17	0	0	0.00	0	0
Palestinian Democratic Union	0	0.00	0	3,257	0.07	0	0
Independents	0	0.00	0	953,465	20.14	4	4
Total	990,873	100.00	66	4,733,888	100.00	66	132

=== 2027 parliamentary elections ===
The 2027 Palestinian legislative election have provisionally been arranged by presidential decree to be held on 11 September 2027 in order to elect the 3rd Palestinian Legislative Council, the legislature of the Palestinian National Authority.

== Presidential elections ==
=== 1996 presidential elections ===
The 1996 president election was won by Yassir Arafat with 88.2% of the vote.

Candidate	Party	Votes	%
Yasser Arafat	Fatah	643,079	89.82
Samiha Khalil	Democratic Front for the Liberation of Palestine	72,887	10.18
Total		715,966	100.00

=== 2005 presidential elections ===
Mahmoud Abbas gained 62.52% of the vote at the 2005 presidential election, while his most important competing candidate, Mustafa Barghouti, won 19.48%.

Candidate	Party	Votes	%
Mahmoud Abbas	Fatah	501,448	67.38
Mustafa Barghouti	Independent	156,227	20.99
Taysir Khalid	Democratic Front for the Liberation of Palestine	26,848	3.61
Abelhaleem Hasan Abdelraziq Ashqar	Independent	22,171	2.98
Bassam as-Salhi	Palestinian People's Party	21,429	2.88
Sayyid Barakah	Independent	10,406	1.40
Abdel Karim Shubeir	Independent	5,717	0.77
Total		744,246	100.00

== Local elections ==
=== 1972 and 1976 local elections ===
Following the Israeli victory in the Six Day War, Israel gave limited autonomy to the West Bank, holding mayoral elections in 1972 and 1976. The elections were held under an amended version of the 1955 Jordanian electoral law, which granted the right to vote to all Palestinians over the age of 21, the law having previously restricted the franchise to male property owners, although women weren't able to vote until the 1976 elections. The changes in the franchise were opposed by Jordan, citing the Fourth Geneva Convention, which stated that an occupying power should maintain the status quo in any occupied territories. There were boycotts and threats of violence in the 1972 elections, but by 1976 the PLO changed to actively participating in these elections. Later elections were not held due to the elections of nationalist mayors in the 1976 elections out of concerns that further elections would "cause damage to the peace process."

=== 2005 local elections ===
Local elections in 2005 were held in four stages, but were never completed. The last stage was on 23 December 2005, with elections in 26 municipalities that had over 140,000 registered voters in Jericho and 25 villages in the West Bank. The elections were observed by the Congress of the Council of Europe, with the head of mission, Christopher Newbury, commenting "Inside the polling stations, the Congress observed a free and fair election. Outside them, further improvements remain to be made."

Further local elections were planned, as over a quarter of the Palestinian population had had no chance to vote in them, including those in major towns such as Hebron, but they did not take place, due to conflict between Hamas and Fatah after the legislative elections of 2006.

=== 2010 and 2012 local elections ===
Four year term of local councils in Palestinian Authority expired in January 2009. Council of Ministers called for local elections to be held on 17 July 2010, but after Fatah proved incapable of agreeing on list of candidates, the call for elections was canceled on 10 June 2010. The election was postponed and was later held in 2012 after several delays.

See Timeline of the 2012 Local Elections

See here for a useful set of maps in Arabic.

=== 2016 and 2017 local elections ===
The elections were planned for 8 October 2016 but were delayed until 13 May 2017.

=== 2021–22 local elections ===
The elections were held on 11 December 2021.

=== 2026 local elections ===
Local elections in most Palestinian cities were held on 25 April 2026.

== Central Elections Commission ==
Following the establishment of the Palestinian Authority in 1993, the "Elections Commission" was formed to conduct the Palestinian presidential and legislative elections in 1996, the first elections in the Palestinian Authority. The Palestinian Central Bureau of Statistics (PCBS) was given the task of voter registration.

The Central Elections Commission (CEC) was established in October 2002 as an independent and neutral body under the General Elections Law of 1995. The Elections Law, issued in August 2005, stipulated that the CEC is "the supreme body that undertakes the management, supervision, preparation and organization of elections and to take all necessary measures to ensure its integrity and freedom". Hanna Nasir has been the chairman of the CEC since 2002.

Under the Local Council Elections Law No. (10) of 2005, the CEC became responsible for organizing local council elections, in addition to organizing elections of the President of the Palestinian National Authority and members of the Palestinian Legislative Council.

== External election assistance ==
The Elections Reform Support Group (ERSG) was formed with support from the United States and the European Union to support Palestinian elections. One of the leading organizations for the ESRG is the International Foundation for Electoral Systems, which has actively assisted the Central Election Commission in 2004–2005 with the help of USAID. They continue to support the election commission.

== See also ==
- 1923 Palestinian Legislative Council election
- Electoral calendar
- Electoral system
