= Hanan Awwad =

Palestinian poet

Hanan Awwad (Arabic: حنان عواد) is a Palestinian activist, advocate, and poet. She is the president and founder of the Palestine section of the Women’s International League for Peace and Freedom (WILPF). Awwad has advocated for Palestine in front of presidents and ministers.

== Life and education ==
Awwad was born in 1951 in Jerusalem. She received a Diploma in Education in 1970 and she graduated from Birzeit University in 1974 with a BA in Arabic Language and Literature. In 1976, she earned a Diploma in Literary Criticism from Al Azhar University in Cairo, Egypt, followed by an MA in 1977 in Arabic Literature and Humanities from Hebrew University of Jerusalem. Awwad studied at Oxford University. She received a second MA degree followed by a PhD from McGill University in Canada. Her dissertation explored the works of the assassinated politician Ghassan Kanafani.

== Career ==
From 1980 and 1982, Awwad worked as a teaching assistant in Islamic Studies at McGill University. She then worked as a researcher for the Department of Middle Eastern Studies of the National Museum of Man. Afterward, she returned to the West Bank. She was Head of the Department of Cultural Studies at the Palestinian Abu Dis College, in Jerusalem, between 1982 and 1986 before she became the Head of the Department of Humanities.

In 1988, Awwad founded the Palestinian Section of the Women’s International League for Peace and Freedom, serving as Middle East advisor. Awwad also served as the cultural advisor for Yasser Arafat from 1998 to 2004. Awwad also founded the Union of Palestinian Writers, the Palestinian Union of Journalists, and the PEN Center for Palestinian Writers (a section of PEN International). She co-signed an open letter in 2016, urging Turkey to release journalists from prison.

== Selected works ==
Awwad writes in Arabic and below is the English translation of the titles of her poetry and books.

Poetry

- I write with my blood, 1983
- The promised return, 1988
- I chose the danger 1988

Books

- Episodes of the Siege
- Arab causes in the fiction of Ghādah al-Sammān, (1961–1975)
