= 1923 Palestinian Legislative Council election =

- 1923
- 12 of the 23 seats in the Legislative Council; Election annulled
Party	Seats
High Commissioner (ex-officio)	1
Appointees	10
Muslims	8
Christians	2
Jews	2
This lists parties that won seats. See the complete results below.

Legislative Council elections were held in Mandatory Palestine in February and March 1923. However, due to an Arab boycott of the elections called by the fifth Palestine Arab Congress, the results of the election were annulled, and an Advisory Council was appointed instead.

== Background ==
The Palestinian Legislative Council was established pursuant to Part III of the 1922 Palestine Order in Council, which was the constitution of the British Mandate. The Council was to consist of 23 members - 12 elected, 10 appointed and the High Commissioner. The ten appointed members were to be the Chief Secretary, the Attorney-General, the Treasurer, the Inspector-General of Police, the Director of Health, the Director of Public Works, the Director of Education, the Director of Agriculture, the Director of Customs and the Director of Commerce and Industry. Of the 12 elected members, eight were to be Muslim Arabs, two Christian Arabs and two Jews. Arabs protested against the distribution of the seats, arguing that as they constituted 88% of the population, having only 43% of the seats was unfair. The Muslim and Christian Arabs boycotted the elections.

== Electoral system ==
Primary elections were held in February to elect secondary electors, who in turn were divided into electoral colleges for the purpose of electing Council members. All male citizens over the age of 25 had the right to vote. A total of 823 secondary electors were to be elected; 670 Muslims, 79 Jews, 59 Christians and 15 Druze.

== Results ==
Whilst the election held between 20 and 28 February returned sufficient numbers of Druze and Jewish electors, only 82 electors were returned by Christian and Muslim Arabs. Voting was extended, but even after the additional period, only 126 Arab electors had been chosen.

== Aftermath ==
After the elections results were annulled, a 12-member Advisory Council was established in May 1923. Its members were:

- Bedouins
  - Fereih Middein (Beersheba)
- Christians
  - Suleiman Bey Nassif
  - Anton Jallad (Jaffa)
- Jews
  - Two members
- Muslims
  - Raghib al-Nashashibi (Mayor of Jerusalem)
  - Aref al-Dajani
  - Ismail Bey Husseini
  - Abdul Fattah es Saadi (Mayor of Acre)
  - Amin Abd al-Hadi (Haifa)
  - Suleiman Bey Touqan (Nablus)
  - Mahmoud Abu Khadra (Mayor of Gaza)
