= Nawab Muhammad Khan Shahwani =

Pakistani politician

Muhammad Khan Shahwani
- محمد خان شاهوانى

Member of the Provincial Assembly of Balochistan
- In office 2013–2018
- Constituency: PB-38 (Mastung)

Personal details
- Born: Sarawan region, Balochistan
- Party: National Party
- Occupation: Politician; Tumandar of the Shahwani tribe

Nawab Muhammad Khan Shahwani (Urdu: نواب محمد خان شاهوانى) is a Pakistani politician from Balochistan and the Tumandar (tribal chief) of the Shahwani tribe.

== Political career ==
Shahwani was elected to the Provincial Assembly of Balochistan from constituency PB-38 (Mastung) as a candidate of the National Party in the general election of 11 May 2013. He served until the dissolution of the assembly ahead of the 2018 general election.
