= Birzeit University =

University in West Bank, Palestine

Coordinates: 31°57′31.29″N 35°10′50.54″E

- جامعة بيرزيت
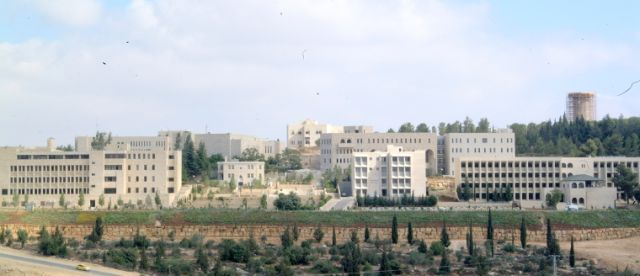
- Birzeit University campus, 2007
- Motto: Building a Better Palestinian Future
- Type: Public
- Established: 1924 (school); 1975 (university)
- Founder: Nabiha Nasir
- Affiliations: UNIMED, AARU
- President: Talal Shahwan
- Academic staff: 617
- Students: 14,743
- Undergraduates: 13,523
- Postgraduates: 1,466
- Location: Birzeit, West Bank, Palestine
- Campus: 200 acres; Urban 800 dunums
- Colors: Green, black and white
- Website: www.birzeit.edu

Birzeit University (Arabic: جامعة بيرزيت) is a public university in the West Bank, Palestine, registered by the Palestinian Ministry of Social Affairs as a charitable organization. It is accredited by the Ministry of Higher Education and located in the outskirts of Birzeit, near Ramallah. Established in 1924 as an elementary school for girls, Birzeit became a university in 1975.

Birzeit University offers graduate and undergraduate programs in information technology, engineering, sciences, social policy, arts, law, nursing, pharmacy, health sciences, economics, and management. It has 9 faculties, including a graduate faculty. These offer 76 Bachelor of Arts programs for undergraduate students and 39 Master of Arts programs for graduate students. As of 2020, more than 15,000 students are enrolled in the university's bachelor's, master's, and PhD programs.

For five consecutive years, Birzeit University has retained its position as the top university in Palestine and is ranked among the best fifty universities in the Arab region according to the 2019 QS Arab Region University Rankings.

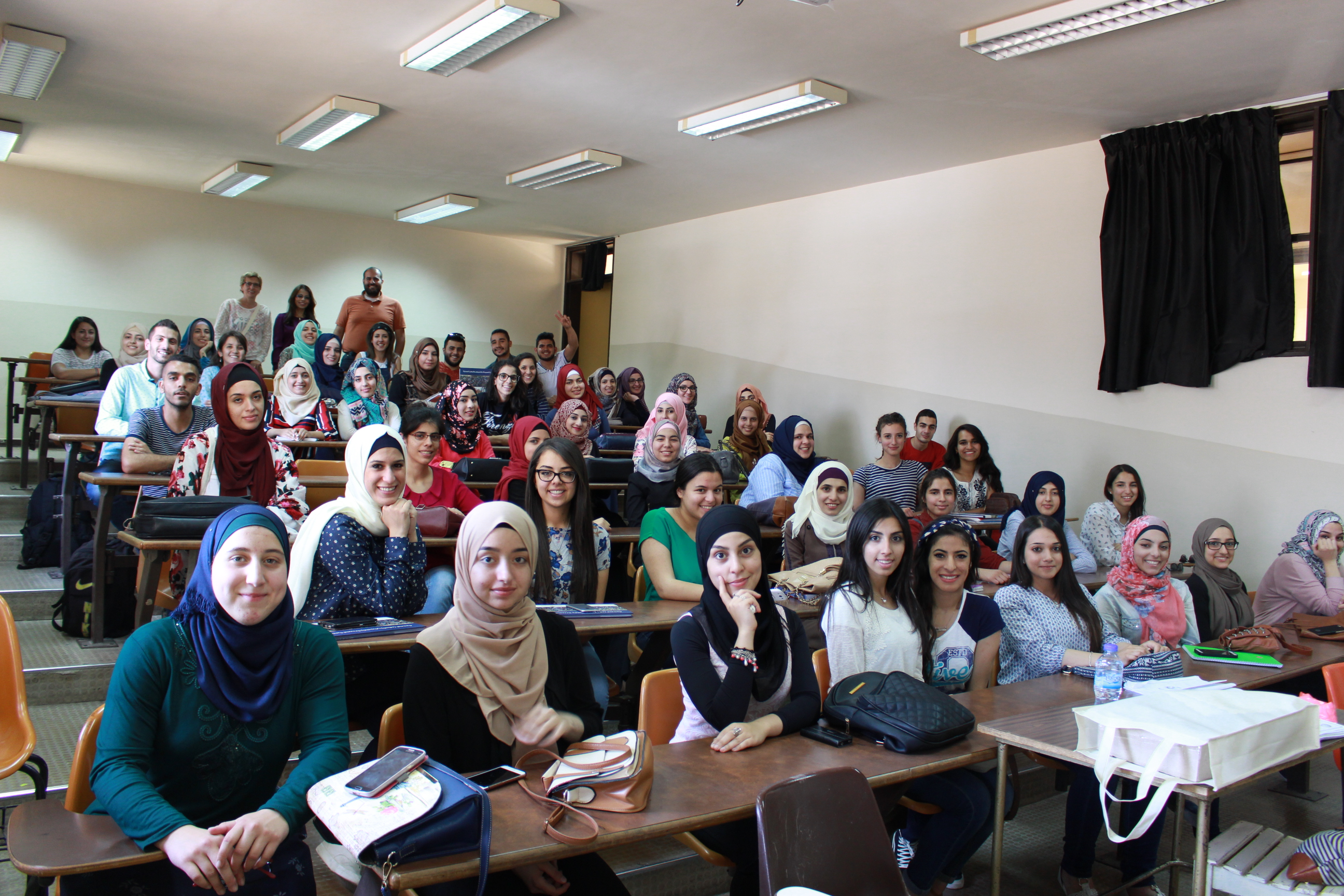
Palestinian students at Birzeit University in 2016

== History ==
=== 1920s–1970s ===
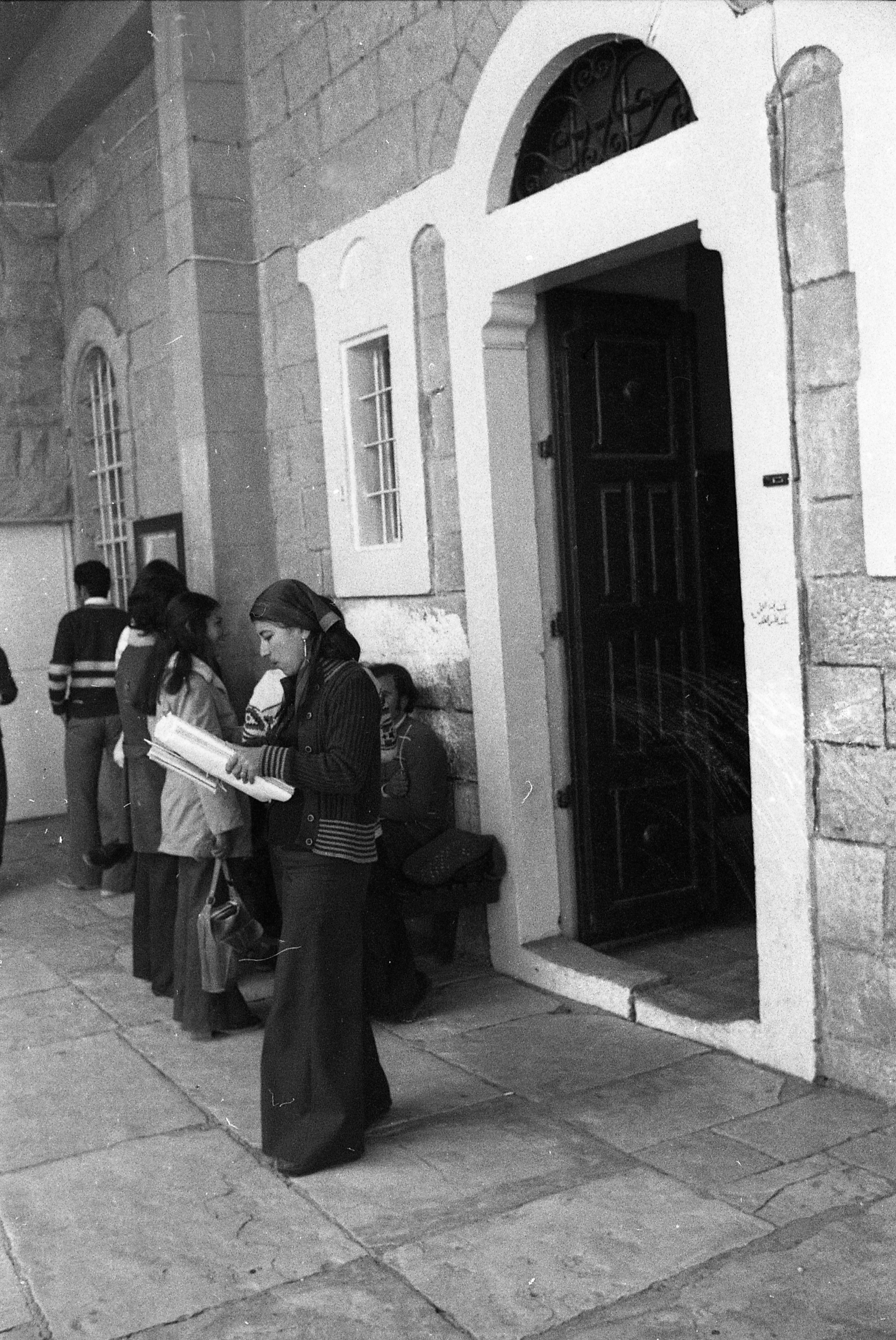
University of Bir Zeit, 1976

Birzeit University was founded in 1924 by Nabiha Nasir (1891–1951) as an elementary school for girls from Birzeit and the surrounding villages, under the name Birzeit School for Girls. It was one of the first modern schools in the area. In 1930, it broadened its scope to become a co-educational secondary school, and in 1932, it was renamed Birzeit Higher School. In 1942, the name was changed to Birzeit College. In 1953, a freshman higher education class was incorporated, followed by a sophomore class in 1961. The university launched a four-year program in 1972, leading to bachelor's degrees in arts and sciences and in 1975 the university officially renamed to Birzeit University. In 1973, the campus faced its first closure for 2 weeks by Israeli authorities, marking the beginning of series of repressive measures against the university community. The students and faculty organised protests, demonstrating their commitment to education and resistance. In April 1976, the university was admitted to the Association of Arab Universities, and then to the International Association of Universities in 1977. France financed the construction of the university to the tune of two million francs. In 1978–1979, the university added the faculties of law, public administration, and information technology.

=== 1980s–1990s ===
On 21 November 1984, a student at the university was shot and killed by the Israeli military, with five others being injured, while taking part in a demonstration in support of Palestinian Liberation Organisation leader Yasser Arafat. In January 1987, history professor Saleh Abd al-Jawad was sentenced to 39 days imprisonment by an Israeli military court after participating in a sit-down strike at the university in December 1986.

During the First Intifada, the university was closed from 1988 until 1992 by the Israeli army, banning higher education in Palestine. The university continued to operate underground, organising small study groups in private homes and makeshift locations despite Israeli raids and harassment. The students, faculty and the community around the university demonstrated for education, turning the closure into a symbol of resilience. The university was the last of six in occupied Palestine to reopen.

=== 2000s–2010s ===
During the Second Intifada in 2000 till 2005, Israeli forces blocked roads to Birzeit University, preventing students and faculty from accessing the campus. The university responded with organised protests, lectures near military checkpoints, and an international campaign advocating for the right to education. The university utilised its electronic systems to maintain remote instruction, ensuring continuity of education during periods of siege and restricted access. The Faculty of Information Technology was established in 2006 (later merged with the Faculty of Engineering to create the Faculty of Engineering and Technology). In 2007, the Faculty of Arts was established. The Faculty of Nursing and Allied Health Professions (later renamed Faculty of Pharmacy, Nursing and Health Professions) was established in 2008.

In 2015, Birzeit University launched the Ph.D. program in social sciences, its first doctorate program. In 2016, the university was ranked first nationally in the January edition of the Webometrics Ranking of World Universities. 2018 saw the establishment of Birzeit University's newest college, the Faculty of Art, Music and Design. The university was ranked top nationally and among the top 3 percent of universities worldwide in the 2018 edition of the QS World University Rankings, and it retained its position in the 2019 edition.

=== 2020s ===
Beshara Doumani assumed office as president of the university in August 2021. In December 2021, a series of violent incidents between students of rival Palestinian factions occurred in the campus. On 14 December 2021, Israeli soldiers and Shin Bet arrested a number of students allegedly involved with a Hamas cell, and accused them of funneling money and organizing rallies in support of the organization, as well as incitement. The same day, hundreds of students took part in a Hamas parade on campus to mark the movement's founding anniversary. Some students also attacked the university's security guards. On 10 January 2022, an undercover Israeli military unit known as the Mista'arvim stormed the university, shooting one student in the leg and detaining four other student activists.

Birzeit University has played a significant role in preserving Palestinian national identity through education and activism. The university has expanded its undergraduate and graduate programs despite challenges such as military closures and resource limitations. It emphasises academic freedom, institutional autonomy, and democratic values, and is recognized as a leading institution in Palestinian higher education.

== Architecture ==
=== Old campus ===
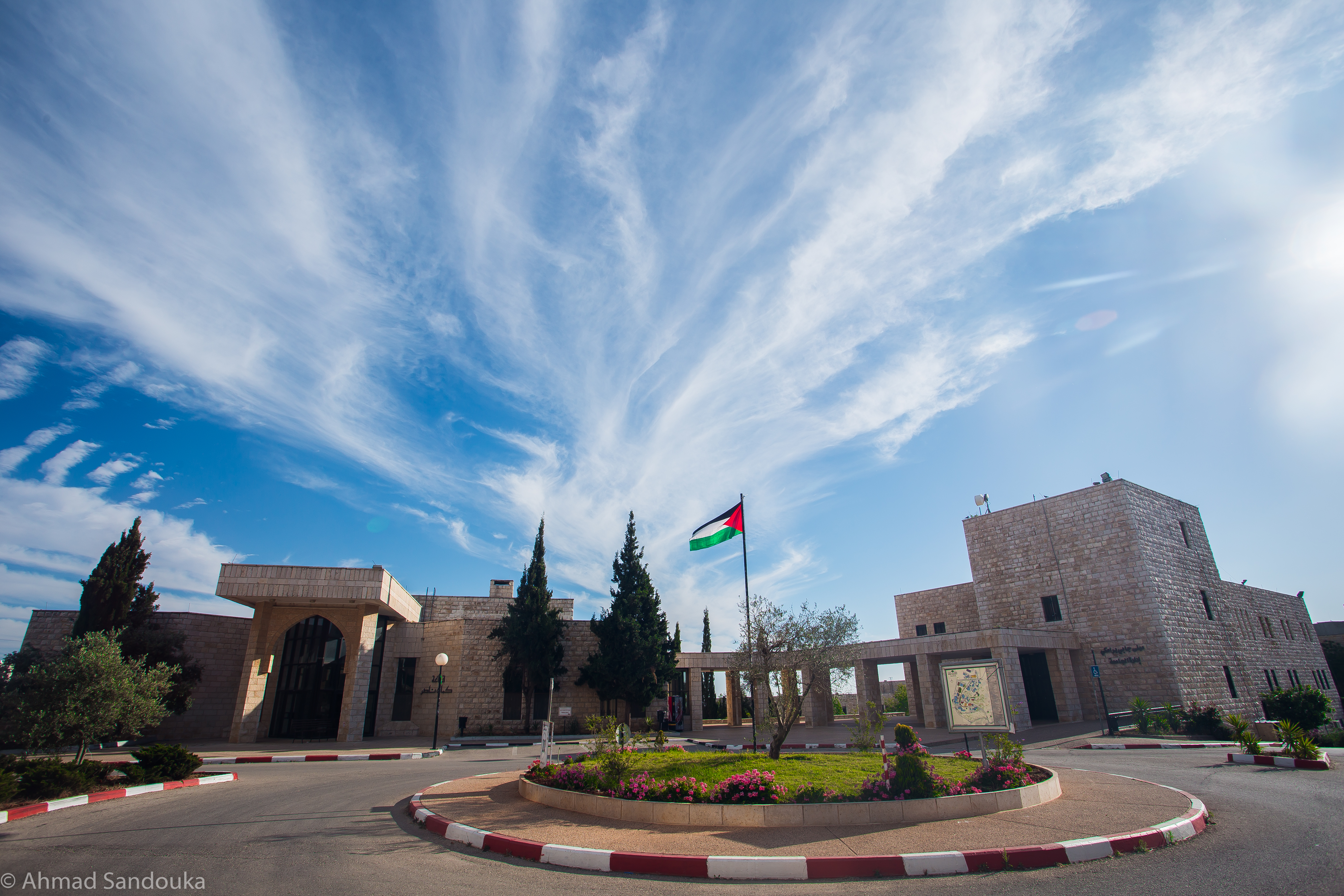
Birzeit university campus

The original Birzeit campus was centered around the historic Nasir family home, built at the end of the Ottoman Empire, and nearby buildings that initially housed the elementary school founded in 1924. This school later evolved into a community college and eventually became the university.

=== New campus ===
Birzeit University's new campus is located atop a hill, with a view on the rolling hill and the Mediterranean Sea. The university's large building complexes and stone facades are designed in a contemporary architectural style, forming a contrast against the surrounding landscape of olive groves and small villages nestled in the valleys.

The relocation of Birzeit University's campus to the village outskirts has led to increased construction of apartment buildings to accommodate students facing mobility restrictions in the West Bank. Israeli-imposed checkpoints and travel restrictions limit daily commuting and require many students to live near campus. The Right to Education Campaign, based at the university, highlights these mobility and access challenges as part of its advocacy for Palestinian students’ right to higher education. This development has shifted land use from agriculture to housing, altering the village's built environment and economy. The demand for student housing has also introduced tensions between long-term residents and the temporary student population, reflecting broader social and geopolitical dynamics in the region, particularly those shaped by the Israeli occupation and the limitations it places on Palestinian movement.

== Structure ==
=== Administration ===
Birzeit University follows a semester system consisting of two primary semesters Autumn and Spring, each lasting four months and two shorter summer session of around two months each. The university is supported by numerous Palestinian, Arab, and international foundations, as well as from various individuals.

=== Board of trustees ===
Birzeit University is governed by an autonomous board of trustees composed of educators and professionals from the Palestinian community. This board appoints the university president and confirms the appointment of vice presidents and deans based on the presidents recommendation. It also approves the university's budget and general development plans, which are presented by the university council.

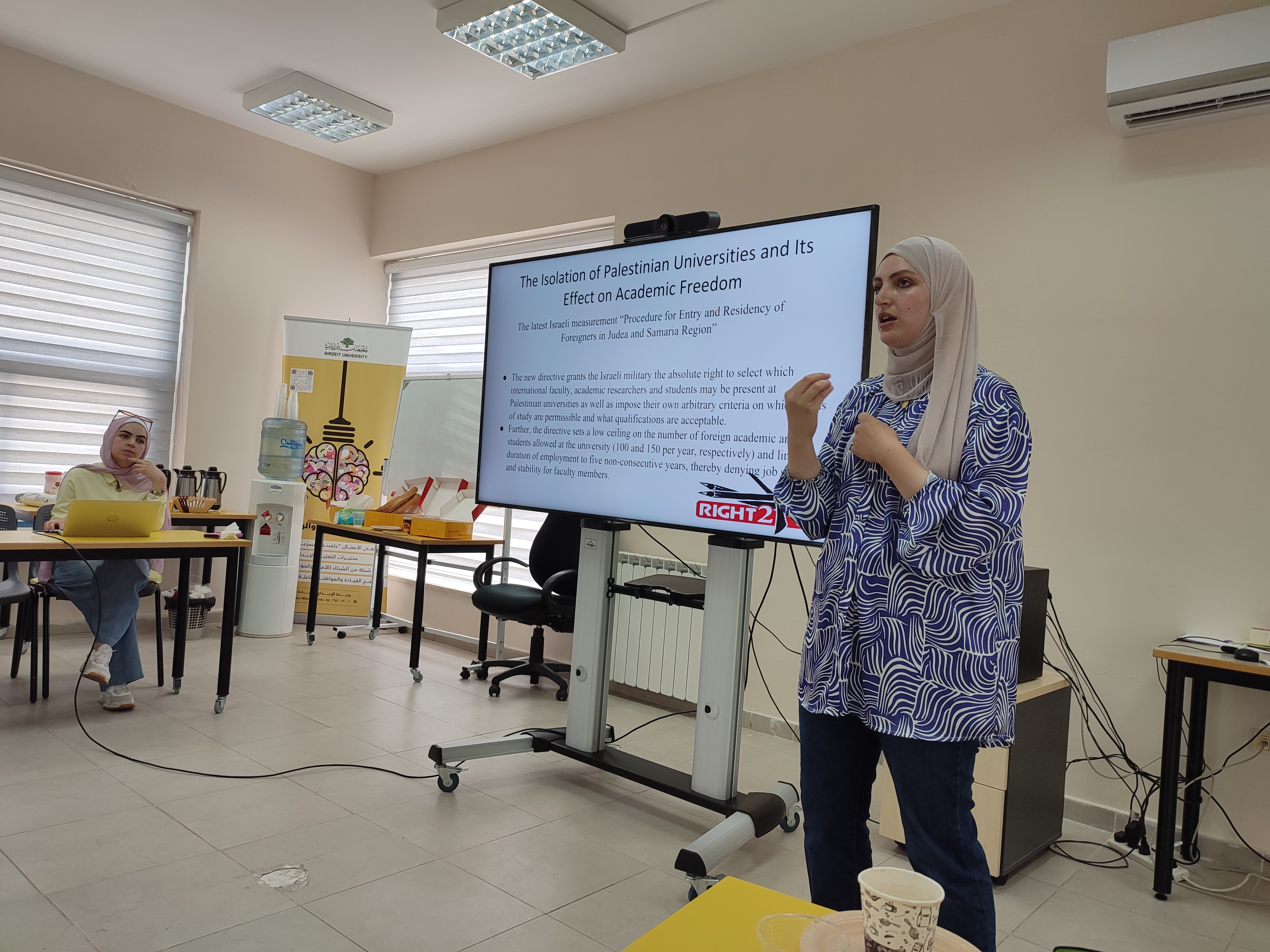
A Birzeit University course

=== Faculties ===
The university is organised into nine academic faculties: (Arts; Science; Business and Economics; Law and Public Administration; Engineering and Technology; Pharmacy, Nursing, and Health Professions; Education; Graduate Studies and Research; and Art, Music and Design), Graduate Studies and Research. Together these faculties offer 76 programs that end in bachelor's degrees, such as the major/minor programs and 39 postgraduate programs that lead to master's degrees. Further, the university offers three Ph.D. programs in Social Sciences; Computer Science and Mathematics.

Birzeit University is affiliated with the independent public opinion research firm Arab World for Research and Development (AWRAD). Arab World for Research and Development (AWRAD) is an independent public opinion research business with his main office in Ramallah. The Palestinian research and advisory organisation focuses on policy design and institutional improvement. To push for evidence-based governance policies and active development, the organization works with local and international partners, including institutions. Birzeit University includes its students and faculty in regional and national research projects, through this partnership. The students get access to development projects and field research in order to improve participation in politics and institution strengthening in Palestine. This collaboration provides practical experience to increase academic learning.

The university provides diverse additional programs such as the Literacy and Adult Education Program established in 1976, aimed at providing technical expertise to nongovernmental organizations operating literacy programs and helping them overcome the challenges they encounter by creating developmental programs or giving books.

Birtzeit University runs a Voluntary Work Program.Since the start of Birzeit University, the Voluntary Work Program has been an important factor. The program requires students to fulfill 120 hours of community as a part of their graduation requirement. This initiative permitting studentsto engage with and explore Palestinian society through practical, educational activities. Public health, education, protecting culture and social integration projects are examples of volunteer programs. Also, students take part in recycling programs, restoring landscapes projects and agricultural work. To prepare students, the university's Office of Student Affairs organises sessions and workshops in topics, like community service and civil protection. Highlighting the university's focus on practical learning and involvement in the community.

The university also offers the Palestinian and Arabic Studies (PAS) program for international and diaspora students interested in learning Arabic and studying the social, political and cultural elements of Palestine. One of the courses,The Palestine Question, discusses topics, like the British Mandate, the rise of Zionism, Palestinian nationalism, the Oslo Accords and the peace process. Weekly field trips and volunteer activities are included in the program to provide students with a deeper understanding of Palestinian daily life.

== Art and culture ==
=== Museums ===
The Birzeit University Museum opened in 2005, is a significant location for exhibitions, workshops, and talks in the Palestinian cultural landscape. Focused as an art space at the core of the university that fosters the creation and practice of contemporary arts within the university community and broader Palestinian society, utilizing a multidisciplinary and experimental approach. The museum critically addresses its colonial legacies by actively challenging traditional museological practices. The university's Ethnographic and Art Museum is a permanent museum with two main collections: the Palestinian Costumes, and the Tawfiq Canaan Amulet Collection. The museum is also involved in Pedagogy a year-round academic programming that fosters critical engagement and research with cultural texts, collections, and interdisciplinary dialogue. The Virtual Gallery is an art gallery promoting visual art through exhibitions, training and educational workshops.

==== History ====
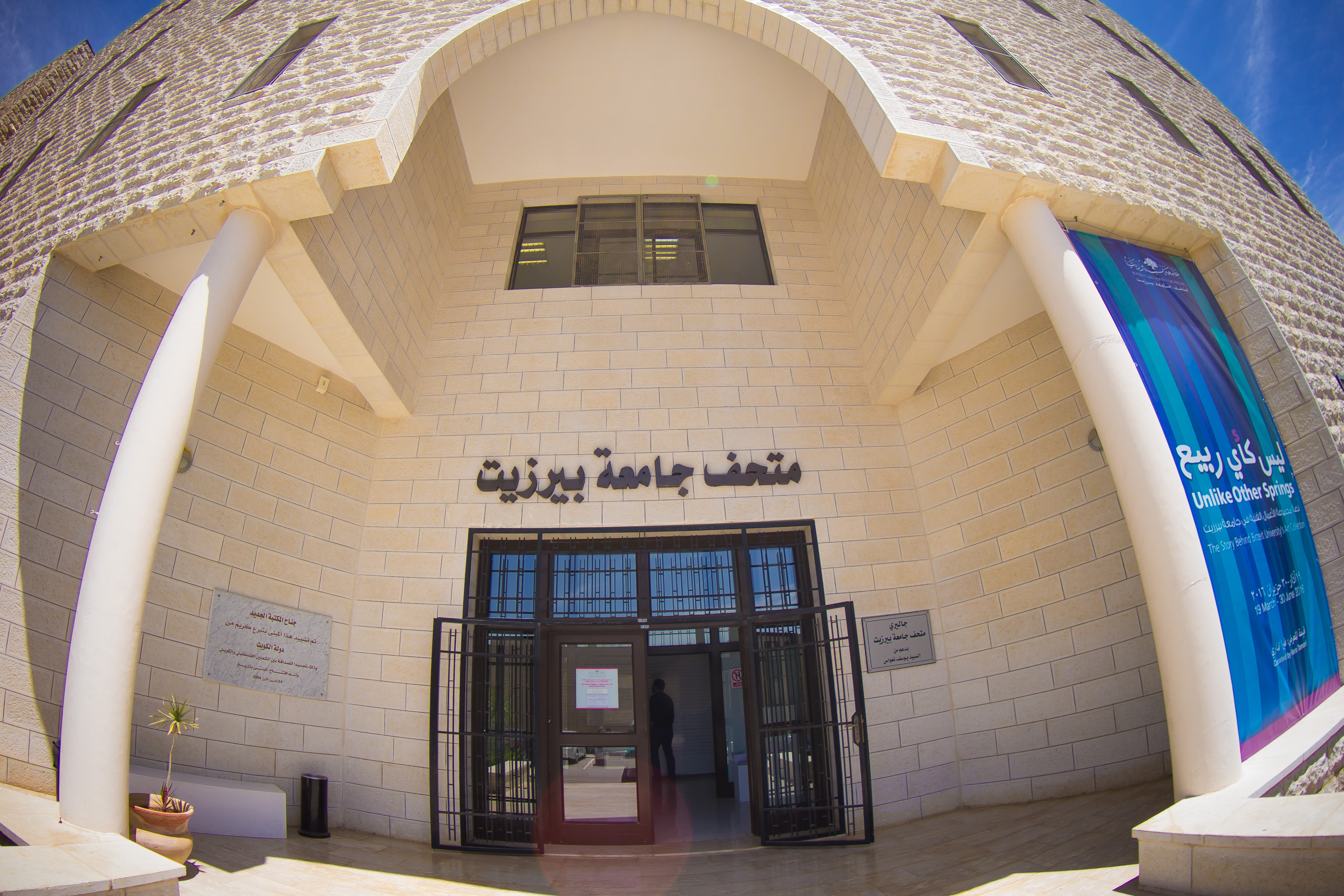
Birzeit University Museum

The museum evolved progressively as soon as Vera Tamari joined the university in 1986. She taught creative courses revolving around art and architecture. She significantly developed the university's artistic programs, eventually taking on major responsibility for its artistic initiatives. Moreover, as more attention was given to artistic practices, the university felt the need to devote a specific and larger space for art collections and creativity. In 1997, Birzeit University established the Founding Committee for the Promotion of Cultural Heritage, laying the foundation for its expanding art collection. Consequently, in 2005, the Birzeit University museum was established. Furthermore, significant donations were made to the museum, from the Palestinian American artist Sari Khoury, Kamal Boullata, Vladimir Tamari, Vera Tamari, Nasser Soumi, and Samira Badran.

=== Political and social projects ===
This museum has a significant political role. Indeed, being part of an academic institution, the museum became important as it became a model of propagation and creation of cultural and artistic practices. Furthermore, this institution became a place where students can express themselves and participate in shared projects as a community.

The Tawfiq Canaan Collection of Palestinian Amulets, now based in Birzeit University, represents a vital intersection of cultural heritage, academic preservation, and political context. Comprising a wide range of amulets and talismans reflecting the religious and social diversity of Palestinian society, the collection documents folk practices related to healing, protection, and belief. In 1955 the collection was donated to Birzeit University by Canaan's daughters. The collection has faced challenges related to preservation and display, leading to the university to engage in institutional efforts to safeguard it. In 1998, the collection was publicly exhibited at the university in a show titled Ya Kafi Ya Shafi (Oh Protector, Oh Healer), which helped raise awareness of its cultural and historical significance. To challenge static representations of culture, a more recent exhibition Beyond Aestheatics in the Birzeit Museum in June 2011, served to re-contextualize Palestinian cultural objects, including the Amulet collection. Emphasizing their deeper societal and traditional meanings beyond mere aesthetics. The museumization of Palestinian heritage served as a means of political resistance and national identity, particularly in the context of occupation. Situated within the broader political landscape, the collection's preservation is not only an academic endeavour but also a political act—asserting Palestinian identity and resisting cultural erasure amid ongoing occupation .

=== Poetry ===
Poetry holds a significant place in Birzeit University. One tradition is the Suk Okaz poetry competition, created since the founding of elementary school. It is based on the recital of classic Arabic poetry by students from the university. In 1995, a public poetry recital was given within the university by the Palestinian poet Mahmoud Darwish.

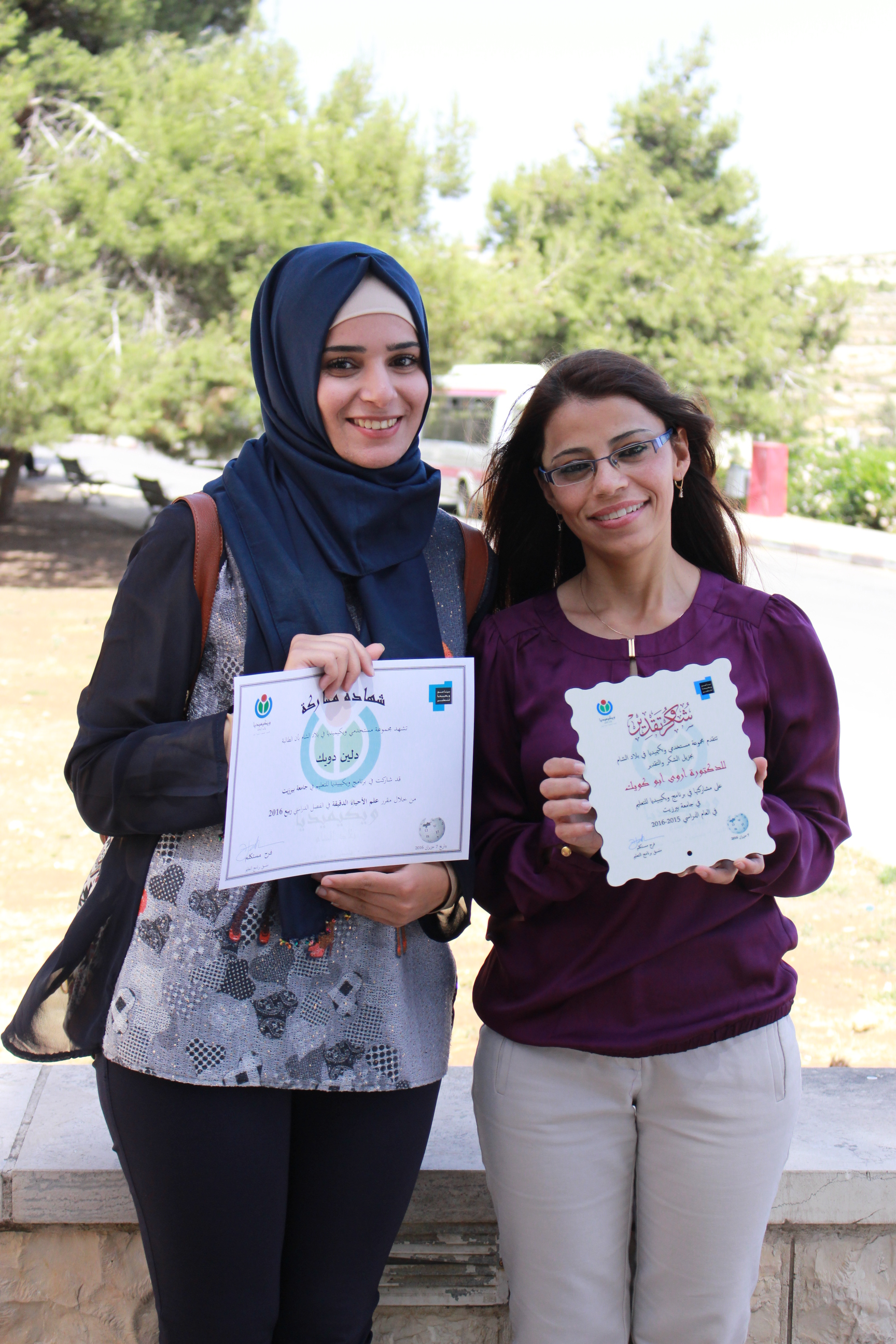
Wikipedia Education Program Birzeit University 2016 Ceremony

== Political engagement ==
=== Israeli-Palestinian conflict ===
Birzeit University has been known as a center of political activism in Palestinian society. Students and staff have been involved in issues related to the Israeli-Palestinian conflict.The university's activities have included hosting events to honor important moments in Palestinian History, providing legal support and working with international organizations to raise awareness about human rights violations.

==== Commemorations ====
Several commemorations were put in place within the university as a sign of resistance and a way to mourn the deaths of Palestinians.

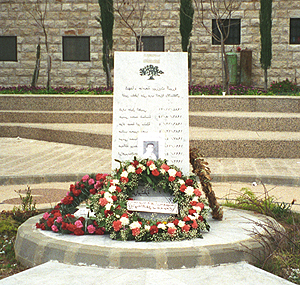
Memorial organized by Birzeit University

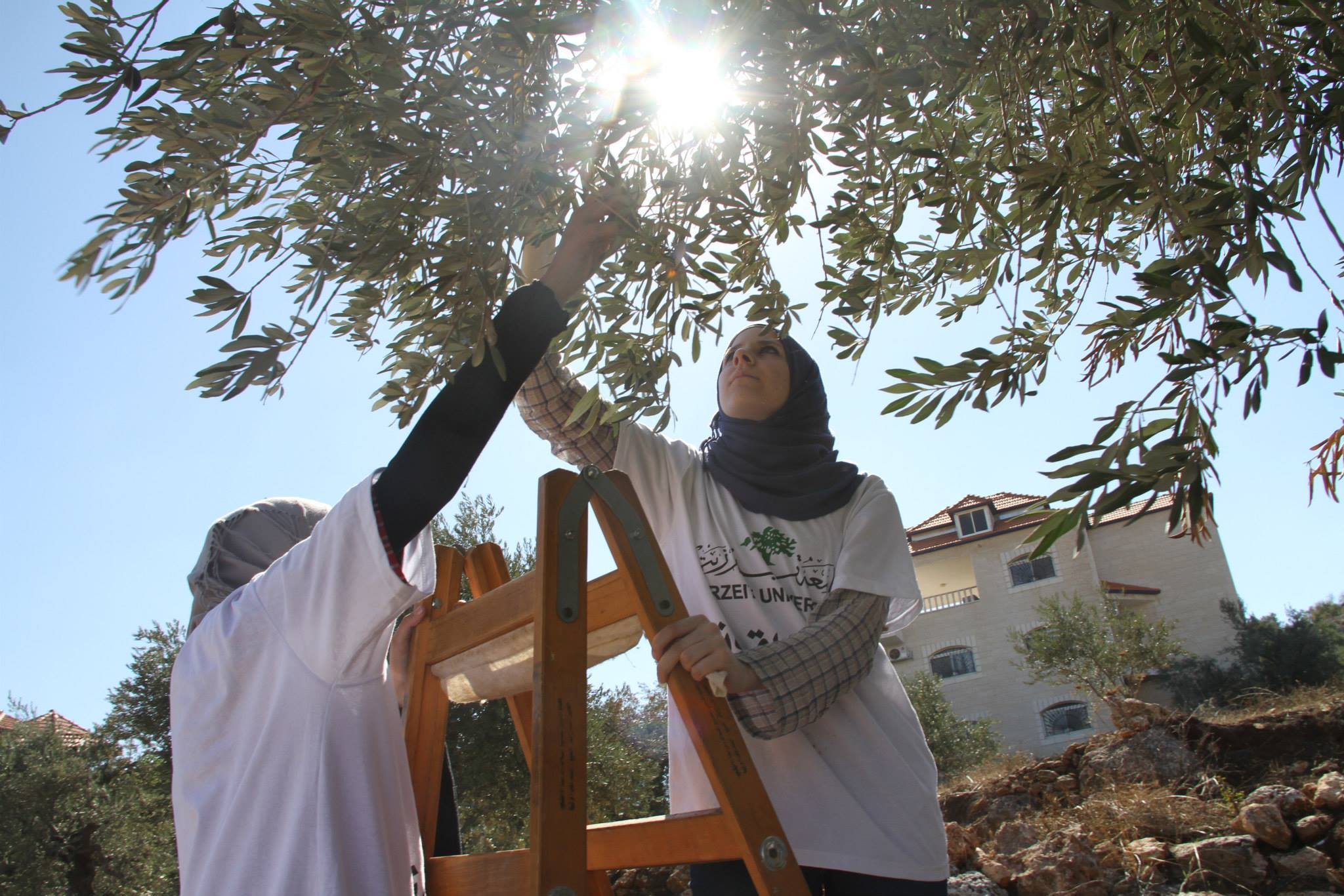
Birzeit University's students helping farmers to collect olives for the purpose of a memorial

In 1976, after the fatal shooting of six Palestinian citizens of Israel by the government for demonstrating against the seizure of land in the Galilee region. Students at Birzeit University organized commemorative activities to remember the victims and show solidarity with Palestinian resistance. These activities were mostly organized by the student council and different student political groups, who were active in leading campus activism. One important activity was the planting of olive trees and other native plants on campus. The events involved students and teachers in large numbers and were seen as a part of the national resistance movement. In the following years, the university community kept organizing yearly olive harvest volunteer activities. Which became a regular way of supporting Palestinian farmers whose land is being seized.

In 1995, Birzeit University erected a memorial in the university's main square commemorating students who had died in connection with the Israeli–Palestinian conflict. The university described those commemorated as "martyrs" and stated that they held "a special place in the hearts of the university community and Palestinian society". The memorial initially contained eleven names, with additional names added in subsequent years. By 2026, the university's official list of martyrs included 41 students and alumni.

Those commemorated died under widely differing circumstances, including in attacks they carried out or helped plan. Among those listed are Fathi Shaqaqi, founder and secretary-general of Palestinian Islamic Jihad; Yahya Ayyash, the chief bombmaker of Hamas and a planner of numerous suicide bombings; Khalil al-Sharif, who participated in preparations for the 1997 Mahane Yehuda Market bombing and was one of the suicide bombers in the subsequent Ben Yehuda Street bombing; and Ihab Abu Salim, a Birzeit University student who carried out the 2003 Tzrifin bus-stop suicide bombing. The list also includes students who were killed during demonstrations and confrontations with Israeli forces.

In October 2026, Israeli forces entered the university campus and demolished the memorial. Birzeit University condemned the demolition, describing the memorial as part of the university's "collective memory".

==== Birzeit's Prisoners Committee ====
Birzeit's Prisoners Committee was created in 1980. It is an informal group from the university dedicated to assisting students and staff who faced harassment from Israeli military authorities. The committee was set up because political active members of the Birzeit University, who supported Palestinian independence were being imprisoned

The aim of the committee was to document violations, contact lawyers, and raise awareness while providing a safe support for all students. These documents recorded violation cases, like torture, arrest and imprisonments without trial. The records were being shared with international and local human right groups to show what difficulties the Birzeit members face. Within the committee, members were looking for legal aid to help detainees and their families. They arranged meetings with lawyers who could handle political cases.

A powerful move of the committee's work called "the art of waiting." Students, teachers and international volunteers, waited for hours outside the Ramallah Military Headquarters to receive news about students and staff who had been arrested. International volunteers waited outside so that the risk was low for the Palestinian members. This movement got both local and international support and loyalty. The committee made an impact by inspiring others to give legal aid and support to prisoners in occupied territories.

===== International solidarity during Gaza war 2024 =====
In 2024, amid the Gaza war, Birzeit University made an appeal to the global academic world against the war, which it characterised as genocide. The university highlighted the importance of human rights and the right to have education during conflict. In 2024, more than 140 Palestinian students across the West Bank have been arrested. As response, Birzeit University called on international universities and scholars to take action in support of Palestinian students. Actions like, speaking out against violence, cutting ties with Israeli institutions.

International organisations have responded by taking action to support the Palestinian students. One of the organisations is the Durham Palestinian Education Trust(DPET), a nonprofit organisation based in the United Kingedom that offers scholarships to Palestinian students so they can attend Durham University. Despite the Gaza war, in 2024 the DPET continued to offer fully financed studentships. DPET helps the students with counseling and legal advice. Students supported by DPET have earned degrees in engineering, peacebuilding and education in recent years.The goal of these scholarships is to help young Palestinians in getting an education, creating skills and then returning to Palestine to help their communities. The students also stay to get their PhDs in Europe and the United Kingdom.

=== Solidarity with Palestinian prisoners imprisoned by Israel ===
In January 2026, a rally made up of students took place. The rally was in solidarity with the Palestinians imprisoned by Israel and against their violent treatment, with a planned showing of The Voice of Hind Rajab. Israeli soldiers raided the event, arriving with vehicles, injuring around a dozen students. The soldiers fired stun grenades and tear gas to disperse the crowd. This resulted in some of the students throwing stones in retaliation. This then escalated into the soldiers firing live ammunition repeatedly into the crowd.

Prior to the rally, the university was contacted by the Israeli army to cancel the event, however, according to a university representative, they would not intervene in the students' expression unless violence took place. In the aftermath, the army responded by claiming to receive intelligence that this event was a gathering for incitement and support of terrorism.When interviewed as to why they fired ammunition into the crowd, the army replied that it was only precise targeting of what they believed were the most violent individuals

The Vice President of Academic Affairs Asem Khali was also detained.

== Notable people ==
By 2023, there are a number of professors who are also ministers in the Palestinian government. Thirteen members of the Palestinian negotiating team in U.S.-sponsored Middle East peace talks were faculty members of Birzeit University.

=== Presidents ===
The former and current presidents of Birzeit University are:

- Hanna Nasser (1972–1974)
- Gabi Baramki (1974–1993)
- Hanna Nasser (1993–2004)
- Nabeel Kassis (2004–2010)
- Khalil Hindi (2010–2015)
- Abdul Latif Abu Hijleh (2015–2021)
- Beshara Doumani (2021–2023)
- Talal Shahwan (2023–)

=== Academics and faculty ===
- Hanan Ashrawi taught literature and serves as the chair of the board of trustees.
- The South African-born sociologist Stanley Cohen worked at Birzeit in support of Palestinian staff and students while a professor in criminology at the Hebrew University of Jerusalem between 1980 and 1996.
- Lara Khaldi taught art history.
- Vera Tamari is a Palestinian artist, art activist, founder of the Birzeit University Museum and lectures Art courses at the university.
- Elia Suleiman a Palestinian filmmaker, taught courses within the university and engaged in the cultural activity.
- Emily Jacir, a visual artist taught courses within the university and developed the university's Art collection by making a donation of a variety of 100 art videos.
- Samia Halaby, a Palestinian American artist worked on an art project with Birzeit University architecture students during a month in 1996.

=== Alumni ===
- Hamze Awawde, Palestinian peace activist
- Hanan Awwad – Palestinian poet and activist
- Husam Zomlot – Head of Mission to the United Kingdom
- Hussein Barghouthi - Palestinian poet, writer, essayist, critic, lyricist, playwright and philosopher
- Yahya Ayyash – Hamas leader (known as "the Engineer")
- Marwan Barghouti—Palestinian political figure convicted of several murders of Israelis, studied in Birzeit between 1983 and 1988 and also headed the Student Council
- Mohammed Shtayyeh—Palestinian politician, academic, and economist who served as Prime Minister of the State of Palestine and the Palestinian National Authority from 2019 to 2024
- Khalida Jarrar—Palestinian representative on the Council of Europe and is currently head of the Prisoners Committee of the Palestinian Legislative Council.
- Atef Abu Saif—Palestinian writer
- Amer Shomali - Palestinian interdisciplinary visual artist
- Muna el-Kurd - Palestinian activist
- Amal Jadou – Palestinian diplomat, first Palestinian woman appointed Undersecretary of the Palestinian Ministry of Foreign Affairs and Expatriates, studied in Birzeit for her master's degree.

=== Visit of renowned people ===
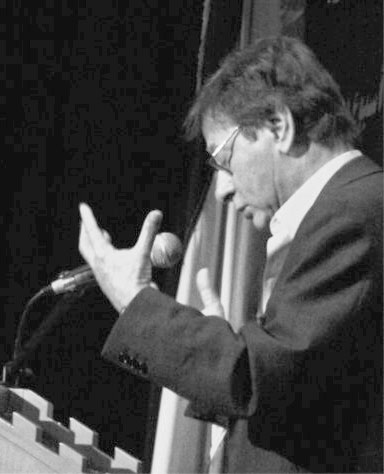
Picture of the Palestinian poet Mahmoud Darwish

During another notable occasion, Mahmoud Darwish brought a delegation of prominent international writers and Nobel laureates from the International Parliament of Writers to visit Birzeit University.

This group included:

- Nigerian Nobel laureate Wole Soyinka
- South African poet and memoirist Breyten Breytenbach
- Chinese poet Bei Dao
- Spanish novelist Juan Goytisolo
- Portuguese Nobel laureate José Saramago
- Italian novelist Vincenzo Consolo
- French writer Christian Salmon
- American novelist Russel Banks.

== See also ==
- List of Islamic educational institutions
- List of universities and colleges in Palestine
- Palestinian Galleries and Museums
