= Elections Reform Support Group =

Forum to support Palestinian electoral reform

The Elections Reform Support Group (ERSG) was a forum of donors co-chaired by the United States and the European Union to coordinate the reform of the Palestinian electoral system. ESRG was founded in 2002. Members include the states of Denmark, Germany, Greece, Ireland, Italy, Japan, the Netherlands, Norway, Spain, Sweden, the United Kingdom, and the United States. Also international organizations such as the European Commission, the United Nations and the United Nations Development Programme participate in this program. International Foundation for Electoral Systems supported the forum in secretarial role.

Since 2007 the ERSG was reformed and integrated into Election Working Group or (EWG), which is part of the "Governance Sector Group", one of the four Strategy Groups under the aid coordination structure in Palestine. Role of the secretariat is assumed by the Local Aid Coordination Secretariat (LACS).

== Formation ==
ERSG was formed as an outgrowth of the UN Task Force on Palestine. The UN task force consists of the Quartet (U.S., EU, Russia and the UN Secretary General), Norway, Japan, the World Bank, and the International Monetary Fund and first met July 10, 2002. This task force was responsible for forming support groups for several areas of reform including Civil Society, Elections, Financial Accountability, Judicial Reform, Local Government, Market Economics, and Ministerial and Civil Service Reform. These groups were a reaction to the declining humanitarian situation in the Palestinian. Once the Elections Reform Support Group was organized, the task force was advised in election activities by Ambassador Jean Breteche of the EU, who would later become the Secretariat of ERSG. Secretarial role was in 2005 assumed by IFES.

== Activities ==
The ESRG was supported by the entire task force and coordinated funding for elections programs from USAID, the EU, European countries and Japan. The ERSG worked with the Palestinian Legislative Council to develop and implement a project to draft election law, supported formation of independent Palestinian Elections Commission and its development into a single, independent, authoritative election management body of the Palestinian Authority.

As part of this support the European Union provided five elections experts and 10 million Euros to support the project, UNDP/PAPP provided two experts, Japan contributed 1 million dollars, Canada contributed 1.2 million Canadian dollars and an expert, Norway contributed 1 million dollars and Denmark provided 300,000 dollars.
