= Amin Abd al-Hadi =

Head of the Supreme Muslim Council

Head of the Supreme Muslim Council
- In office 20 December 1948 – ?
- Preceded by: Amin al-Husayni

Member of the Ottoman parliament

Member of the Supreme Muslim Council
- In office 1929–?

Personal details
- Born: 1897
- Died: 1967 (aged 69–70) Cairo, Egypt

Amin Abd al-Hadi (Arabic: أمين عبد الهادي; 1897–1967) was the former head of the Supreme Muslim Council. Originally a member of the Ottoman parliament, he was later appointed by the British Mandate authorities to a provisional advisory council which served as a legislative body in Palestine dealing with self-government issues in May 1923. In 1929, he was elected a member of the Supreme Muslim Council. He later succeeded Amin al-Husayni as head of the council after Jordan appointed him to the position on December 20, 1948. He moved to Cairo in the late 1960s and died there in 1967.
