= Hanna Nasser (academic) =

Palestinian academic and political figure

Hanna Nasir

Chairman of the Palestinian Central Elections Commission
- Incumbent
- Assumed office 2002
- President: Yasser Arafat

President of Birzeit University

Head of the Palestine National Fund
- In office 1982–1984

Personal details
- Born: 14 January 1935 (age 91) Jaffa, Mandatory Palestine
- Education: Purdue University
- Occupation: Academic, Political figure

Hanna Nasir (Arabic: حنا ناصر; born 14 Jan 1935), alternately transliterated Hanna Nasser, is a Palestinian academic and political figure.

== Early life and education ==
Nasser was born in Jaffa in 1935. His cousin was Kamal Nasser who was assassinated by the Israelis in Beirut in 1973.

Nasser holds a PhD in Nuclear Physics from Purdue University in the United States.

== Career and activities ==
Nasser was a long-time president of Birzeit University, which his father, Musa Nasser, founded. He directed the school's transition from a community college to an accredited university. In November 1974 Nasser was exiled by the Israeli authorities. He continued to serve as Birzeit's president in exile; while the school's vice-president managed its day-to-day business, Birzeit officials regularly visited Nasser in Amman to receive his input on major decisions.

Nasir served on the Executive Committee of the Palestine Liberation Organization between 1981 and 1984 and held the position of Head of the Palestine National Fund between 1982 and 1984. Nasir, along with 29 other exiles, was allowed to return to the West Bank in May 1993 as the peace process got under way. He remained president of Birzeit until his retirement in 2004.

In 2002, Yasser Arafat appointed Nasir to the post of Chairman of the Palestinian Central Elections Commission (CEC). The CEC was established by the Palestinian Authority in 1995 as an independent body, responsible for the conduct of elections in the Palestinian territories. In the post, Nasir oversaw the presidential election in 2005, the legislative election in 2006, and the local election in the West Bank in 2012 and 2017.

== Personal life ==
Born to a Palestinian Christian family, Hanna is the father of three sons and one daughter.

=== Awards ===
He holds honorary titles including the French Legion of Honour and an honorary doctorate from the American University in Cairo.
