= Talal Shahwan =

Palestinian chemist and academic (born 1968)

Talal Rebhi Abd-Allah Shahwan (Arabic: طلال ربحي عبد الله شهوان, romanized: Ṭalāl Raḥbī ʿAbd Allāh Šahwān; born May 28, 1968) is a Palestinian chemist and university professor. He was appointed as president of Birzeit University from August 1, 2023.

== Biography ==
Shahwan was born in 1968 in Jordan, from a Palestinian family from the town of Hableh in Qalqiliya Governorate. He acquired his high school degree from the scientific branch of Al Saadya High School in Qalqilya in 1986.

He studied in Birzeit University but the Israeli lockdown of the university during the first Intifada stopped him from continuing his studies. He later moved to Turkey and acquired his bachelor's degree in Chemical Engineering from the Middle East Technical University in 1994. He then acquired his master's degree in 1997 and doctorate in 2000 from Bilkent University. He worked as a teacher and instructor in the same university in the years 1995–2002, then moving to Izmir Institute of Technology until the year 2008.

He started his work for Birzeit University at September 1, 2008, then becoming an associate professor of chemistry in 2012. He was the head of the Chemistry Department in the Faculty of Science for a year, then became the Dean of Higher Studies and President of the Scientific Research Committee on 2013-2018 while also working as vice president of the university's academic relations president.

On June 12, 2023, Hannah Nasir, the chairperson of the board of trustees in Birzeit University announced his decision to appoint Talal Shahwan as the President of university from August 1, 2023, after the former president Beshara Doumani resigned.

Stanford University in 2022 chose him as amongst the 2% of the most quoted scientist in the world in their respective fields. He has over 41 published scientific articles.
