= Amal Jadou =

Palestinian diplomat

- أمل جادو
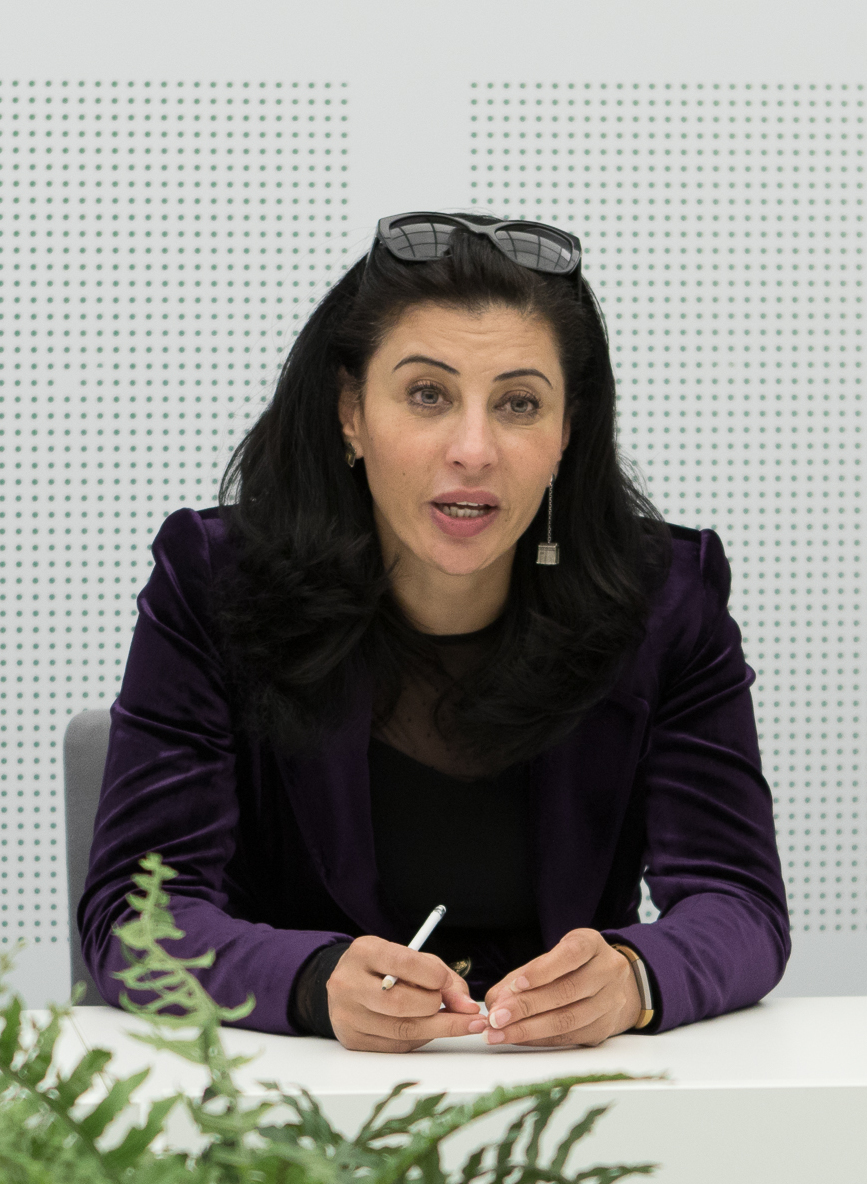

Palestinian ambassador to the European Union, Belgium and Luxembourg
- Incumbent
- Assumed office October 2024

Undersecretary of the Palestinian Ministry of Foreign Affairs and Expatriates
- In office September 2019 – April 2024

Personal details
- Born: August 28, 1972 (age 53) Aida Camp
- Citizenship: Palestine
- Education: Bethlehem University; Birzeit University; Fletcher School of Law and Diplomacy
- Occupation: Diplomat
- Awards: Order of the Star of Italy

Amal Jadou (Arabic: أمل جادو; born on September 28, 1972, in Aida Camp) is a Palestinian diplomat. She has been the Palestinian ambassador to Belgium, Luxembourg and the European Union since 2024. She was the first Palestinian woman appointed Undersecretary of the Palestinian Ministry of Foreign Affairs and Expatriates by Mahmoud Abbas in September 2019. She stayed in office until April 2024.

== Education ==
Amal Jadou received her primary and secondary education in UNRWA schools. She has a Bachelor of Arts from Bethlehem University, where her studies focused on English as a language and literature. She studied her master's degree at Birzeit University and wrote her thesis on "Histories of occupation: comparing processes and outcomes in the cases of the Cherokee and the Palestinian Nations". Then, she joined the Fletcher School of Law and Diplomacy for her PhD. Her dissertation was on “ 'Regime Analysis': An Alternative to Traditional Explanations of the Failure of the Israeli-Palestinian Peace Process (1993-2000)". She is a Doctor of Arts, International Relations and Affairs. She also took part in a program of the Harvard Law School focusing on mediation and negotiations as a graduate fellow. She speaks Arabic, English and Hebrew.

== Career ==
She began her career working for the Palestinian Authority in 2005. In 2009, she joined the Palestinian Mission in Washington, D.C. as a senior advisor, later becoming deputy ambassador. In 2012, she started working as an assistant to the foreign minister for European affairs and in 2019, she became the first Palestinian woman to be appointed undersecretary at the Palestinian Ministry of Foreign Affairs and Expatriates.

Since October 10, 2024, she has been the Palestinian ambassador to Belgium, Luxembourg and the European Union. The king of Belgium accepted her credentials in November 2024, during his first meeting with a Palestinian diplomat in his country. She also met with Josep Borell, High Representative for Foreign Affairs and Security Policy for the European Union, to present her credentials as a member of the General Delegation of Palestine to the European Union.

== Awards ==
She received the “Lady Star of the Night” Medal from an Italian president Sergio Mattarella in July 2018 for her work in consolidating Palestinian-Italian bilateral relations.

== See also ==
- Palestinian Ministry of Foreign Affairs and Expatriates
- Foreign Relations of Palestine
