= Causes of the First Intifada =

The First Intifada was a major Palestinian uprising against Israeli occupation between 1987 and 1993. While the Intifada is widely agreed to have broken out spontaneously, scholars, journalists, and figures involved in Israeli and Palestinian politics during the Intifada, have proposed a wide range of factors as underlying causes of the uprising. These factors include ones that contributed to the initial outbreak of unrest in late 1987, ones that contributed to the development of that unrest into a sustained popular uprising, and ones that contributed to the uprising taking on the particular shape that it took.

== Background ==
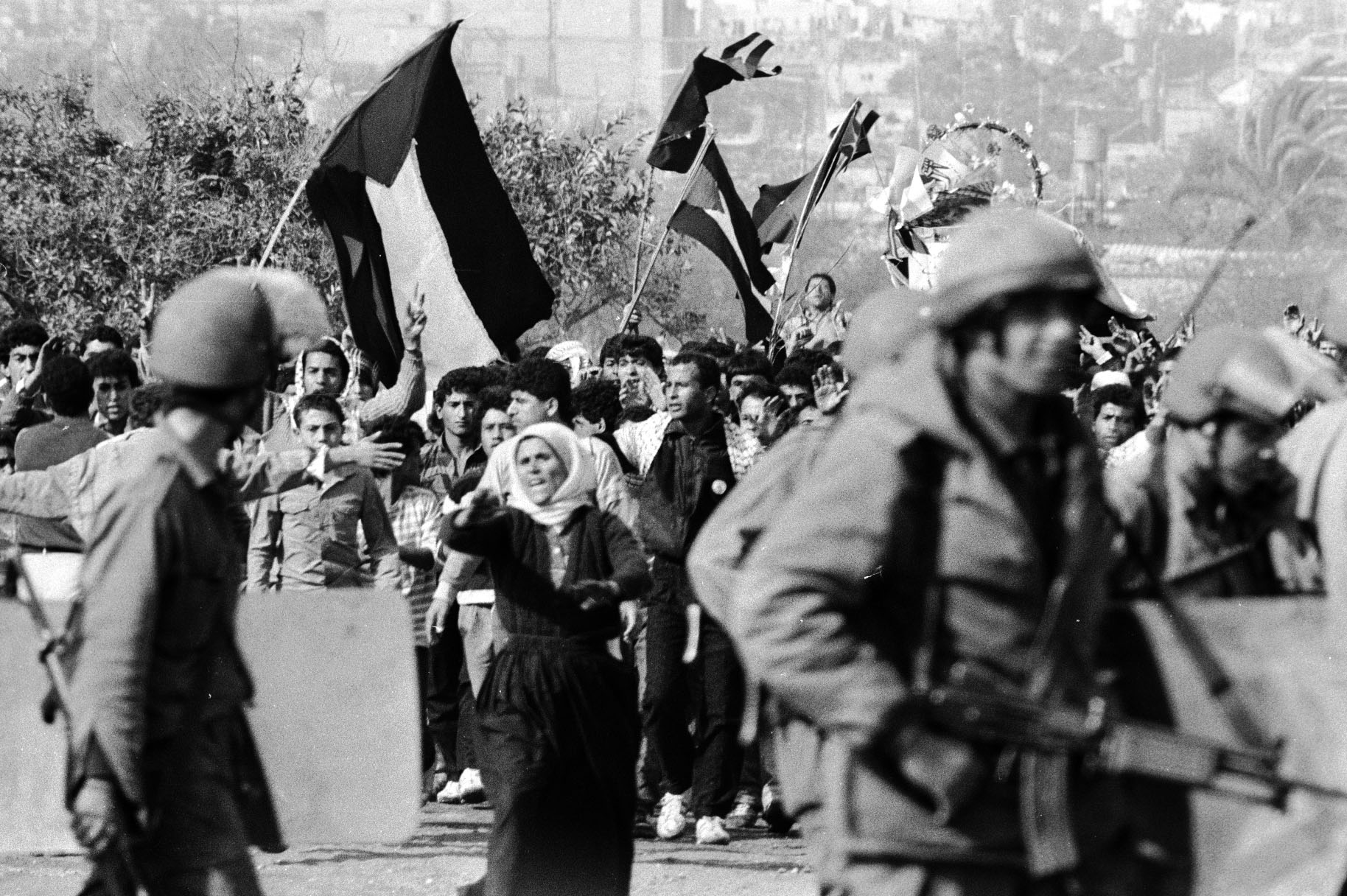
A demonstration in the Gaza Strip during the First Intifada, December 1987.

On 9 December 1987, an Israeli truck driver collided with and killed four Palestinians in the Jabalia refugee camp. The incident sparked the largest wave of Palestinian unrest since the Israeli occupation began in 1967: the First Intifada. During its early stages, the Intifada was largely characterised by a non-violent campaign, with actions including labour strikes, tax strikes, boycotts of Israeli goods, boycotts of Israeli institutions, demonstrations, the establishment of underground classrooms and cooperatives, raisings of the banned Palestinian flag, and civil disobedience. The actions were led by the Unified National Leadership of the Uprising (UNLU) and its popular committees, representing a decentralised and clandestine coalition of grassroots organisations, including labour unions, student councils, and women's committees. Although it claimed allegiance to the Palestinian Liberation Organisation and many of the grassroots organisations were affiliated with PLO factions (especially the Palestinian Communist Party, the DFLP, the PFLP, and Fatah), the UNLU operated outside of the direct control of the PLO leadership, who were mostly in exile in Tunisia or imprisoned (or had been killed by Israeli forces and PLO splinter factions over the preceding years).

The Israeli government responded to the outbreak of the Intifada with a harsh crackdown, however, with Minister of Defence Yitzhak Rabin pledging to suppress it using "force, might, and beatings," including ordering Israeli soldiers to break the bones of Palestinian protestors, imposing widespread lockdowns on Palestinian cities, closing all schools and universities, mass arrests, and demolitions of Palestinian houses. By 1990, as the Israeli crackdown severely damaged the Palestinian economy, institutions, and morale, as the extremist conservative Islamist Hamas emerged, as the PLO leadership in exile attempted to take on greater day-to-day control over the Intifada, and as many of the initial UNLU organisers had been arrested, the UNLU lost its ability to direct the course of the uprising. The uprising subsequently grew more and more disorganised and violent, including Palestinian internal political violence against rumoured collaborators and attacks against Israelis. By the end of the Intifada, over a thousand Palestinians had been killed and over a hundred thousand injured by Israeli forces, with around two hundred Israelis having been killed by Palestinians and around 350 Palestinians killed by other Palestinians.

The First Intifada would come to an end between 1991 and 1993, with a series of intensive peace negotiations starting with the Madrid Conference of 1991. These negotiations marked the first time that the Israeli government agreed to negotiate directly with Palestinian leaders. The negotiations culminated in the 1993 Oslo Accords.

== Overview of causes ==
Ian Lustick identifies four common themes in explanations for the outbreak of the First Intifada: "an explosion caused by pent-up despair and humiliation," the uprising as "a strategic extension of the PLO'S struggle to gain Palestinian national liberation," the uprising "having sprung from and been modeled after grass-roots organizations active in the territories during the preceding decade," and a "reflection of changes in Israeli politics and policies toward the territories." Eitan Alimi of the Hebrew University of Jerusalem has grouped explanations into four clusters: explanations that focus on inter-state developments (particularly Palestinian disillusionment with the role of other Arab states in the Israeli-Palestinian conflict), explanations that focus on the socio-economic effects of the Israeli occupation (particularly the growing grievances among Palestinians), explanations that focus on the shift in nationalist tactics within the occupied territories (particularly the shift towards mass mobilisation), and explanations that focus on the tactics which were used during the Intifada itself (including its effects on Israeli soldiers and on the mass media). Samih Farsoun and Jean M. Landis of the American University identified three main models of explanations: an "outside agitator" model, favoured by the Israeli government early in the outbreak of the Intifada that claimed that PLO agitators had incited violence, a "volcanic" model, favoured by Western commentators that claimed that the Intifada was an abnormal eruption of mass anger and generalised frustrations, and a "political process" model, which they prefer, claiming that the Intifada was not a mindless eruption but was rather a consciously political response based on deliberate collective action against specific grievances.

Ahsan I. Butt of George Mason University has listed the main causes of the Intifada as: a prolonged economic recession in Palestine, increasing Israeli control over day-to-day life, Israeli policies increasingly placing Palestinian development as subordinate to Israeli economic needs, increased Israeli settlement, and a pervasive sense of humiliation among Palestinians. Aryeh Shalev of the Jaffee Center for Strategic Studies, a former Brigadier General in the IDF, has listed the main causes as: Palestinian nationalism, poor living conditions in Palestinian refugee camps, widespread feelings of humiliation and frustration among Palestinians, rising Islamic fundamentalism, the rise of a new generation of Palestinians, economic recession among Arab states in the mid-1980s, growing sentiment among Palestinians that neither the PLO nor other Arab states could solve the occupation, the growth of popular organising structures in Palestine beginning in the 1970s, and the loss of the IDF's deterrent profile over the course of the 1980s.

Mamdouh Nofal, a co-founder of the Democratic Front for the Liberation of Palestine and later high-ranking member of the Palestine Authority during the 1990s, claimed that the main causes of the Intifada were: poverty in the occupied territories, a sense of humiliation caused by Israeli occupation policies, a loss of belief in the PLO's guerilla warfare strategy, and a feeling that other Arab states had abandoned Palestinians. Palestinian journalist Daoud Kuttab claimed that the main causes were: the defeat of the PLO in Jordan, Lebanon, and Syria, the growth of grassroots Palestinian organisations in the occupied territories, an increasing willigness by Palestinian nationalists to consider other methods than armed struggle, a feeling of abandonment by other Arab states, and the Israeli government moving away from Moshe Dayan's liberal occupation policy.

According to the Encyclopædia Britannica, "the proximate causes of the First Intifada were intensified Israeli land expropriation and settlement construction in the West Bank and Gaza Strip after the electoral victory of the right-wing Likud party in 1977; increasing Israeli repression in response to heightened Palestinian protests following the Israeli invasion of Lebanon in 1982; the emergence of a new cadre of local Palestinian activists who challenged the leadership of the Palestine Liberation Organization (PLO), a process aided by Israel's stepped-up attempts to curb political activism and break the PLO's ties to the occupied territories in the early 1980s; and, in reaction to the invasion of Lebanon, the emergence of a strong peace camp on the Israeli side, which many Palestinians thought provided a basis for change in Israeli policy. With motivation, means, and perceived opportunity in place, only a precipitant was required to start an uprising."

== Increasing frustrations of everyday life in the Palestinian Territories ==
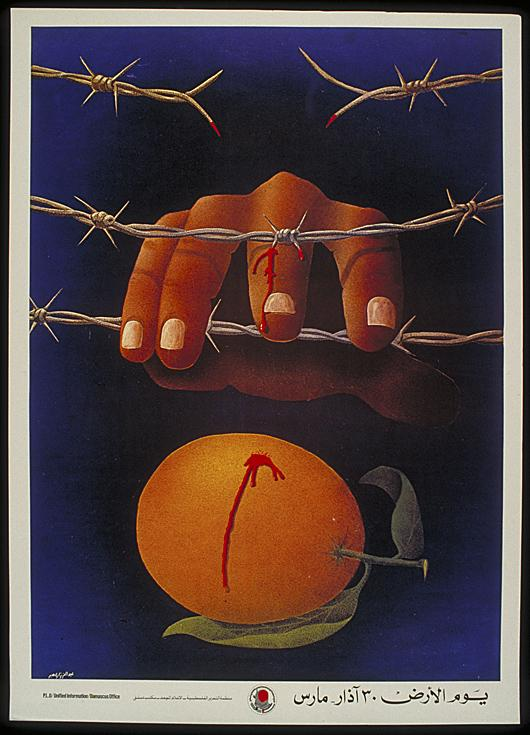
1984 Fatah poster for the annual Land Day protests.

Israeli civil rights activist Israel Shahak claimed in 1991 that "the chief reason for the outbreak of the intifada" was that "before the Intifada, the daily oppression, humiliations, land confiscations and arbitrariness of the Israeli regime were steadily increasing." According to Aden Tedla of the Global Nonviolent Action Database, "Palestinian discontent about the quality of their living conditions and their lack of political and economic autonomy began to escalate" through the 1980s, citing factors such as the establishment of checkpoints in Palestine by the Israeli military, the requirement for Palestinians to carry ID cards to travel between Palestinian communities, heavy taxes imposed by the Israeli Civil Administration on Palestinian imports and exports, the requirement for Palestinians to pay taxes to the Israeli state, lower wages for Palestinians than Israelis, and an increasing shortage of arable land available to Palestinians. Reviewing Ze'ev Schiff and Ehud Yaari's 1990 book Intifada: The Palestinian Uprising—Israel's Third Front, Lustick states that "Schiff and Ya'ari's explanation for the intifada emphasizes the cumulative rage of Palestinian refugees, workers, and farmers. In particular, they stress the unbearable conditions in Gaza refugee camps, the frightening new threats to divert some of what remained of the farmers' water resources to Israeli settlers, and, especially, the bitterness of Palestinians employed inside Israel at the routine humiliations inflicted upon them by soldiers, policemen, and border patrolmen."

=== Lack of civil liberties ===
Some commentators have argued that the wide-ranging restrictions on civil liberties imposed on Palestinians inside the occupied territories by the Israeli authorities contributed to the outbreak of the Intifada, particularly as those restrictions became more intense following the mid-1980s adoption of the "Iron Fist" policy. Nadia Naser-Najjab of the University of Exeter and Ghassan Khatib of Birzeit University have argued that "a series of repressive and humiliating crackdowns in the Occupied Palestinian Territories, including an upsurge in home demolitions, deportations, arbitrary school closures, and various other forms of collective punishment" by the Israeli government impacted "upon almost every aspect of daily Palestinian life." Michael S. Serrill of Time Magazine noted that there was "a policy of strict, often arbitrary censorship of all newspapers, magazines and books that circulate in the territories... Israeli soldiers and border police can enter Arab homes without a warrant. Palestinians are routinely stopped and required to show identification papers. Arabs can be detained for up to six months without trial. Their houses can be sealed or demolished on suspicion that a member of the family is engaged in 'terrorist' activity. They can be arrested for dozens of offenses that do not exist in Israel, including flying the Palestinian flag, reading 'subversive' literature or holding a press conference without permission. Restrictions on civil liberties grate hard against the Palestinians’ self- esteem."

According to Palestinian-American scholar Edward Said, "there was a proliferation of over a thousand laws and regulations... Books by the thousands were banned. The colours of the Palestinian flag were outlawed; even the word 'Palestine' could earn its user a jail sentence... To plant a tree required a permit. To hold meetings also required a permit. Entry and exit required permits. To start a well required a permit, one that was never given." According to Swedish journalist Nathan Shachar, "Gazans with innocent requests or applying for trivial permits often found themselves facing a Shabak operative, whose task it was to find out if the applicant could be coaxed to offer anything in return for the concession." Farsoun and Landis have written that Israeli military orders in the occupied territories "require no public review; nor are they subject to review by governmental or public bodies within Israel," also noting that "Israel has prohibited any meaningful political activity on the part of Palestinians in the occupied territories. Palestinian political parties or organizations have been outlawed, and political demonstrations, or mere collective gatherings of more than ten people, are considered crimes."

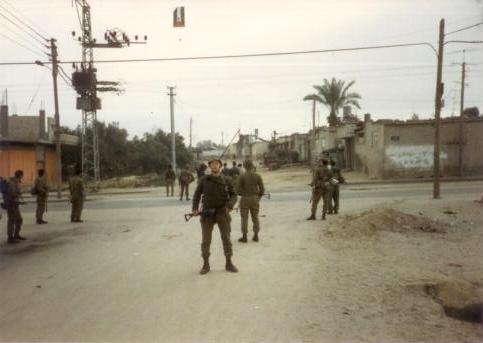
An Israeli patrol removing the Palestinian flag in Rafah in March 1987. Displaying the flag had been made illegal under the Israeli occupation.

=== Stalled living standards ===
According to Farsoun and Landis, "the lack of public investment in health facilities led to a decline in the number of hospital beds from 26 per 10,000 population in 1974 to 18 per 10,000 in 1985." A 1986 report on the Gaza Strip by former deputy mayor of Jerusalem Meron Benvenisti's West Bank Data Base Project warned that health conditions in Gaza had become "catastrophic," that the Gazan citrus industry was failing because of Israeli limits on exports, that the Gazan fishing industry was failing because of Israeli security on Gazan boats, that Gazan schools were overcrowded and deteriorating, and that Gaza was running out of fresh water.

Other commentators have cited the significant growth of the Palestinian population between 1967 and 1987, particularly in Gaza, as contributing to a stall in living standards. According to Yosef Goell of The Jerusalem Post, in the years prior to the Intifada, "it has become fashionable of late to speak of the 'human time-bomb,' referring to Gaza, saying that living conditions "remained relatively fixed [since the late 1970s] because whatever gains were made in total income were largely wiped out by the rapid population growth. It is that situation that can be expected to get worse during the coming years." Mouin Rabbani of the Institute for Palestine Studies and Lisa Hajjar of the University of California, Santa Barbara have noted that, by 1987, the population density of the Gaza Strip had reached "3754 people per square mile, about the same as Hong Kong, and one of the highest in the world."

=== Recession of the Palestinian economy ===
According to Kenneth W. Stein of Emory University, "the uprising occurred in an economic setting in which many middle- and lower-class Palestinians found themselves suffering from several years of severe financial hardship. Dramatic price drops, particularly in agriculture and amputated international markets, caused enormous strain on the local economy. Although present in previous years, traditional sources of capital import into Palestine were stringently reduced by changes in regional and international conditions." According to Butt, "both the Gaza Strip and the West Bank suffered major economic slumps in the 1980s. Between 1981 and 1985, per capita GNP fell almost 2 percent annually in Gaza and 0.7 percent annually in the West Bank."

Farsoun and Landis have argued that remittances by the Palestinian diaspora, particularly from those in the rich, oil-producing Gulf states, played a major role in sustaining the financial well-being of Palestinians in the occupied territories, but that those remittences had declined considerably between the early 1980s and 1987, especially because of the 1980s oil glut; "this regression has been a pivotal catalytic factor contributing to the timing of the intifada." Shalev has also noted that employment for the Palestinian diaspora in the Gulf "had nearly dried up because of the economic crisis the Gulf countries were experiencing."

=== Stalled development of the Palestinian economy ===
Jacob Høigilt of the Fafo Foundation has described the economic situation that emerged in Palestine by the 1980s as a result of the Israeli occupation as "economic depression and blocked industrialization." According to Leila Farsakh of the University of Massachusetts Boston, the period between 1967 and 1990 "witnessed the West Bank and Gaza's economic integration into Israel through trade and labour flows. Some 35 to 40 percent of the employed Palestinian labour force worked in Israel during this period, largely contributing to the doubling of Palestinian per capita income but also to the gradual shrinking of major economic sectors (agriculture, industry, and services), which were not able to grow viably and in response to Palestinian rather than Israeli demand and supply. This is when Palestinian economic growth was primarily described as 'stalled,' that is, below capacity, or skewed, meaning that growth was tied to Israeli demand and labour exports rather than to domestic demand and employment." American journalist Robert Zelnick wrote in January 1988 that the occupied territories, "by textbook definition of the term, have become Israeli economic colonies."

According to Israeli historian Ilan Pappé, Israeli companies "dumped their products on the territories, undercutting local factories and producers. This was accompanied by an aggressive marketing campaign of Hebraizing signposts, public spaces and individual consciousness... The realization of the economic price paid by dependence on the occupiers’ market was visible in additional ways. It was seen by the Palestinian workers comparing their wages with those of their Jewish colleagues (they were paid half as much). It was also painfully evident to independent professionals who had to pay taxes at a rate bureaucrats are free to impose on an occupied population. It was obvious to entrepreneurs who had to go through a humiliating and degrading process of pleading for concessions and subcontracts. Finally, it was driven home to thousands of villagers who were forced to leave their farms." Sergio Catignani of the University of Sussex has written that "the strangling bureaucracy that developed in the territories compounded the effects of Palestinian dependency," adding that Israeli goods enjoyed high levels of protection in the occupied territories, that Palestinians had to pay an effective "occupation tax," and that the relationships between the broader Palestinian people and those Palestinian notables who were willing to act as intermediaries with the Israeli government had collapsed by the early 1980s. Don Peretz of Binghamton University has noted that Palestinian integretation into the Israeli economy since 1967 "was responsible to a large extent for the spate of new homes, household goods, automobiles and other consumer items that spread throughout the territories," but "while the territories were flooded with imports from Israel, little if any industrial development took place."

Farsoun and Landis have written that the Israeli government's occupation policies had the effect of making Palestinian infrastructure dependent on Israeli infrastructure, giving as an example that "the occupied territories' electric generation units have been linked to the Israeli grid. Permission to expand the production capacity of power companies or to construct new electrification projects required for industrial or agricultural expansion must be granted by the military government, a requirement that has resulted in the maintenance of power capacity in the occupied territories at pre-1967 War levels." In the American Jewish Year Book, Ralph Mandel also cited the controversial Israeli takeover of the Palestinian-owned Jerusalem District Electricity Company in late 1987 as contributing to tensions "because it had incurred heavy debts to the Israel Electric Corporation, from which it was compelled to purchase nearly all its power."

Some commentators have cited cases of development initiatives in the occuied territories being blocked by the Israeli government over concerns that those initiatives would be in competition with Israeli industries. According to Shachar, "Israel protected its own markets ruthlessly from all Gazan competition, agricultural or otherwise... Often government initiatives to improve Gazan infrastructure were stifled by Israeli interest groups; as when the labour union Histadrut torpedoed plans to modernise Gaza's harbour for fear it would compete with the Israeli port Ashdod." Rabbani and Hajjar named a case where "one Israeli military order in the West Bank makes it illegal for Palestinians to pick and sell wild thyme (to protect an Israeli family's monopoly over the herb's production)." According to Jim Lederman of Foreign Policy, "Israel consistently had restricted industrial development in the occupied territories out of fear that Palestinian-owned industries would compete with Israeli ones. As a result, industry as a proportion of the gross domestic product of the West Bank fell from 9 per cent to 6.7 per cent from 1968 to 1984. Only five enterprises employed more than 100 people."

=== Discontent over taxation ===
Another economic factor that has been cited as playing a major role in sparking the Intifada was Palestinian discontent over Israeli taxation. According to the Jerusalem Media & Communication Centre, among Palestinians, Israeli taxation had become "a focus of resentment," with "a widely held conviction that the Israeli authorities had been profiting increasingly from the system of taxation."

According to Rabbani and Hajjar, "Israel contributed $240 million in aid and investment to the Occupied Territories in 1987 but took back $393 million in taxes. In the 20 years of Israeli rule from 1967-1987, residents paid Israel a net “occupation tax” of $800 million, 2.5 times as much as the entire Israeli government investment in the territories over that period." In Meron Benvenisti's 1986 report, he claimed that it was "apparent that the occupation is not only self supporting but in fact may be profit making" for the Israeli government, citing the facts that Palestinians paid more in taxes to the Israeli government than the Israeli government invested in Palestine and that most Palestinians had little choice but to buy Israeli consumer goods.

=== Discontent of Palestinians working in Israel ===
Erika G. Alin wrote that "Israel sought to use the relatively cheap Palestinian work force in labor-intensive sectors of its economy and to transform the territories into a large market for Israeli products, both of which required that it prevent the development of an indigenous industrial and manufacturing base among resident Palestinians. One consequence of Israeli economic policy was a decline in the traditional, predominantly agricultural base of Palestinian society and the emergence, in the early and mid 1970s, of a large migratory workforce, dependent on employment in Israel for its livelihood." Farsoun and Landis noted that the percentage of West Bank and Gazan workers employed inside Israel rose from 4,3% in 1968 to 36,9% in 1985, with those workers being "substantially overrepresented" in low-status manual labour jobs.

Shachar has described the "daily exodus of Gazan workers into Israel" during the 1980s: "the “slave-markets” of poor Gazans were part of the early morning Israeli landscape. The sight of shivering and badly-clad Gazans squeezing together around an improvised camp-fire with a coffee-pot meant that labour was to be had cheaply for those who needed a sewer cleaned up, pianos moved or building-blocks hauled. The atmosphere around those fires always appeared cheerful and friendly, but the moment a possible employer appeared all companionship was shelved. If someone called out “Ten needed for 450 a day!” a huge scramble would break out, with pushing and shoving in order to squeeze in before the others into the van of the Israeli road-builder or contractor." American journalist Ned Temko wrote in 1988 that "under Israel, the Gazans have become the South African blacks of Palestine. They rise at dawn to board buses for day-jobs inside Israel, they return after sundown."

British-Israeli political scientist Ahron Bregman has named the military checkpoints at the Erez Crossing in the Gaza Strip as a particular hotspot of frustration for Palestinian workers, saying that the workers were "humiliated and often delayed for hours with no explanation... They were not allowed to stay in Israel overnight and, while many of them did make the long daily journey back home, some preferred to break the law and hide overnight in Israel just to spare themselves the humiliation at the Erez Crossing." Shalev has also described that a "feeling of humiliation was pervasive in life under protracted occupation. Individuals felt humiliated when, for example, they were subjected to strip-searches in the course of security checks for residents returning from Jordan via the two Jordan River bridges. Inhabitants felt demeaned daily by the attitude of Israeli soldiers at roadblocks, especially in the aftermath of terrorist acts. Most notorious in this regard, in the eyes of the population, was the Erez checkpoint."

Multiple commentators have also pointed to the lack of support Palestinians working in Israel received from Israeli labour unions as a factor contributing to tensions. Shachar has noted that Israeli union protections for Palestinian workers that were initially set-up in 1967 were gradually "underdermined and hollowed out. There were countless instances of money being deducted from paychecks to pension and unemployment funds which later failed to honour their obligations to the Gazans." McDowall has written that Palestinians "who worked legally inside Israel paid compulsory dues to the Israeli union, Histadrut, but received no benefits or support from it." Bregman has written that Palestinians working in Israel frequently "talked of the harsh way they were treated by a country that demanded they pay social security - which they knew would never be repaid to them - but also banned them from joining labour unions and establishing workers' committees." Joost Hiltermann of the International Crisis Group has argued that Israeli labour unions largely failed to protect the rights of Palestinians working in Israel, leading those Palestinians to turn towards expanding Palestinian unions; and as Palestinian unions could not organise those workers in their workplace because of Israeli restrictions, they focused organising on workers' homes inside the occupied territories.

=== Generational change ===
The role of Palestinian youth in sparking the Intifada has been widely remarked upon. According to Aden Tedla of the Global Nonviolent Action Database, "in 1988, 59 percent of Gaza's population was under the age of nineteen, and many of these youths had only known life under the Israeli occupation. These frustrated youths wanted to resist Israeli dominance, and many of them felt that older generations had become too accustomed to the occupation." Avraham Sela of The Harry S. Truman Research Institute for the Advancement of Peace has stated that "the fomenters of the intifada represented a generation that grew up in the shadow of the Israeli occupation, with all its internal contradictions: between an “enlightened occupation” and threatening Jewish settlement."

According to Naser-Najjab and Khatib, in the 1980s, an "emerging generation actively sought to develop new techniques and strategies of resistance through which the occupation could be directly challenged. This caused elements within the PLO to express concern that its revolutionary preeminence was being indirectly challenged." The New York Times quoted Palestinian writer Jamil Hammad in late December 1987 as saying that "My sons are very different from my generation. They did not witness the Arab defeat of 1967, so they don't have any inferiority complexes. But most important, my sons believe that they can, by their actions, change the world. They are full of confidence. They are not smashed and frustrated like my generation." According to Peretz, "by the end of 1987 frustration among Palestinian youth could not be controlled, even by the cooler heads among the older generation, the traditional "notables" or the occupation forces with their threats of increasing use of force."

=== Radicalisation of Palestinian students ===
Palestinians in the occupied territories placed heavy cultural emphasis on education and universities in the 1970s and 1980s, leading to Palestine becoming one of the best-educated nations in the Middle East. However, as Boaz Ganor of Reichman University has noted, "this progress did not translate into demand for skilled labor. Instead, university students had to increasingly accept menial labor in Israel, leaving young Palestinians with limited opportunities to apply their higher skills," while "educated youth were likewise more exposed to the increasing politicization and radicalization of student movements and the emergence of new ideological and political movements." According to Peretz, "young Palestinians, among the best educated groups in the Middle East, had only limited opportunities to apply their higher skills, especially since the return of thousands of workers from the Gulf states following cutbacks in oil production during the early 1980s."

Some commentators have also cited the policies of the Israeli government towards Palestinian universities as contributing to the radicalisation of Palestinian students in the years prior to the Intifada. Hiroyuki Suzuki of the University of Tokyo has pointed towards Israeli Military Order No. 854 in 1980 that placed Palestinian universities under Israeli military control, citing a major wave of protests in Spring 1985 by Bethlehem University students after four students were injured a demonstration and a major wave in late 1986 by Birzeit University students after two students were killed by the Israeli military in a demonstration against a new checkpoint on campus. Palestinian-American scholar Edward Said noted that Palestinian students during the 1970s and 1980s saw their universities frequently ordered closed by the Israeli government, sometimes for weeks at a time. According to Ann M. Lesch of Villanova University, "being elected to the student council almost guaranteed detention or deportation." According to Shalev, "universities became hothouses for Palestinian nationalism and revolutionary ideas."

=== Radicalisation of Palestinian refugees ===
British historian Martin Gilbert argued that the Intifada "drew much of its numerical strength from the twenty-seven Palestinian refugee camps inside Israel. Not allowed by the Jordanians to integrate into Jordanian society before 1967 and remaining for the most part in their camps after 1967, or in the poorest of housing elsewhere in the West Bank, the refugees of 1948 contained a bitter hard core of extremists who were prepared to face Israeli bullets in order to defy the occupiers and assert their national identity." According to Laetitia Bucaille of the University of Bordeaux, "towns and villages paid their tribute to the resistance, but the refugee camps often appeared to be on the front line. Camp youths were particularly active, and many of them formed the cadres of the uprising. As important, the intifada changed the social status of camp residents. Previously considered the lowest layer of the social edifice, they gained power and prestige through their political involvement and exposure to repression. Militants became proud of their refugee camp identity." In early January 1988, British Minister of State for Foreign Affairs David Mellor, visited the Jabalia refugee camp and declared that "I defy anyone to come here and not be shocked... as long as this place exists in the form it does, it will be a condemnation of a country founded on a very strong moral force. To write off the disturbances here as just organised externally, or by just a few people in the P.L.O., is to totally underestimate the misery of the lives of the people that one sees here."

By 1987, unemployment rates in the refugee camps in the Gaza Strip had reached 35%, and, according to Pappé, in those camps, "the average family of five persons made do with a room and a half, usually with an outside toilet and nothing comparable to a madafa, a living-room, an important space for Middle Eastern families and for their relations with their neighbours. The refugees were also the most politicized sector of the society, which probably explains why they had borne the brunt of Israel's collective punishment policy in the two years preceding the uprising. The worst of these punitive acts was the sealing off of houses, or rather of refugee huts." Shalev wrote that "half of those in the Gaza Strip [refugee] camps lived in subhuman conditions (typically a large extended family residing in a dwelling of 60–70 sq. meters, with no running water, and sewage flowing openly in the streets); of the other half, about two-thirds lived in poor neighborhoods... Generally speaking, it was the refugees, impelled by their harsh living conditions, who were initially in the forefront of the uprising, especially in the Gaza Strip." According to Bregman, "in 1973, the Israelis embarked on a programme aimed at rehabilitating the refugees by constructing apartments and providing money to inhabitants to build their own houses. But this was done at snail's pace and fell short of Palestinians' expectations. On the eve of the Intifada, only 8600 families had been moved to new housing, and at this rate it was apparent that the camps would never be dismantled, for it would take about fifty years to build new homes for the other 33,000 families."

== Changes in internal Palestinian politics ==
=== Shift in nationalist tactics towards mass civilian organising ===
British journalist Helena Cobban has suggested that the Intifada emerged as part of a third phase of Palestinian nationalist tactics. During the first phase, from 1948 to 1967, nationalist tactics were centred around hopes of a successful intervention by neighbouring Arab states, while during the second phase, from 1967 until 1982, nationalist tactics were centred around Palestine Liberation Organization-led guerilla warfare. According to Cobban, following the failure of those phases, nationalist tactics turned towards "mass civilian organising," with the 1980s in the Palestinian Territories showing "a steady growth in organizing activities in all sectors and at all levels: women's organizations, labor unions, professional organizations, relief organizations, student movements—you name it."

American historian Wendy Pearlman has described the period from the late 1970s through the 1980s as a "war of the institutions" where "PLO factions vied to recruit as many members as possible," and "tens of thousands of men, women, and youth became linked in political networks. This grassroots organising represented a radical alternative to traditional, top-down patterns of politics. It schooled a new generation that was raised under occupation, was not afraid to challenge it, and viewed community-based political participation as a way of life." According to Francesco Saverio Leopardi of the University of Edinburgh, there was "a multiplication of trade unions and popular associations due to the high degree of political competition" between Palestinian factions in the 1980s, with each faction aiming "to achieve the highest number of members possible."

This shift towards mass organising was influenced by the Israeli government's move to ban the Palestinian National Guidance Committee and disband Palestinian city councils that had been elected in 1976. Serrill noted that "Palestinians in the occupied territories are almost completely disenfranchised. All mayors are now Israeli appointed. Israel tried twice, in 1972 and 1976, to sponsor municipal elections in the West Bank and establish a measure of self-rule. But the Palestinians undermined the process by electing candidates who openly declared their allegiance to the banned P.L.O.. In 1976 the P.L.O. won a smashing victory, electing its representatives as mayors of all the major towns and villages. The Israeli response was to declare some of the contests invalid and to deport some of the winners. There has been no balloting since then. Today most political activity in the territories is banned, and membership in political organizations is severely restricted. This has helped spawn underground nationalist and religious movements that favor radical solutions." According to Rex Brynen of McGill University, following the decline of the nationalist municipal leadership, "the level of popular organization grew dramatically in the form of student, trade union, and women's organizations. Such organization (and the diffuse local leaderships they spawned) proved far more resistant to Israeli countermeasures than the earlier reliance on a relatively small number of public nationalist figures. In terms of elite types, this form of organization also provided new mechanisms for participation and upward political mobility, both in urban centers and in rural areas and the camps, and would provide much of the organizational underpinning for the intifada." According to Lustick, "by proliferating at the grassroots level, these organizations produced enough capable leaders in enough different localities to frustrate the Israeli policy of decapitating Palestinian organizations by regularly imprisoning or deporting leaders who emerged at the national or regional level."

=== Growth of the Palestinian Communist Party ===
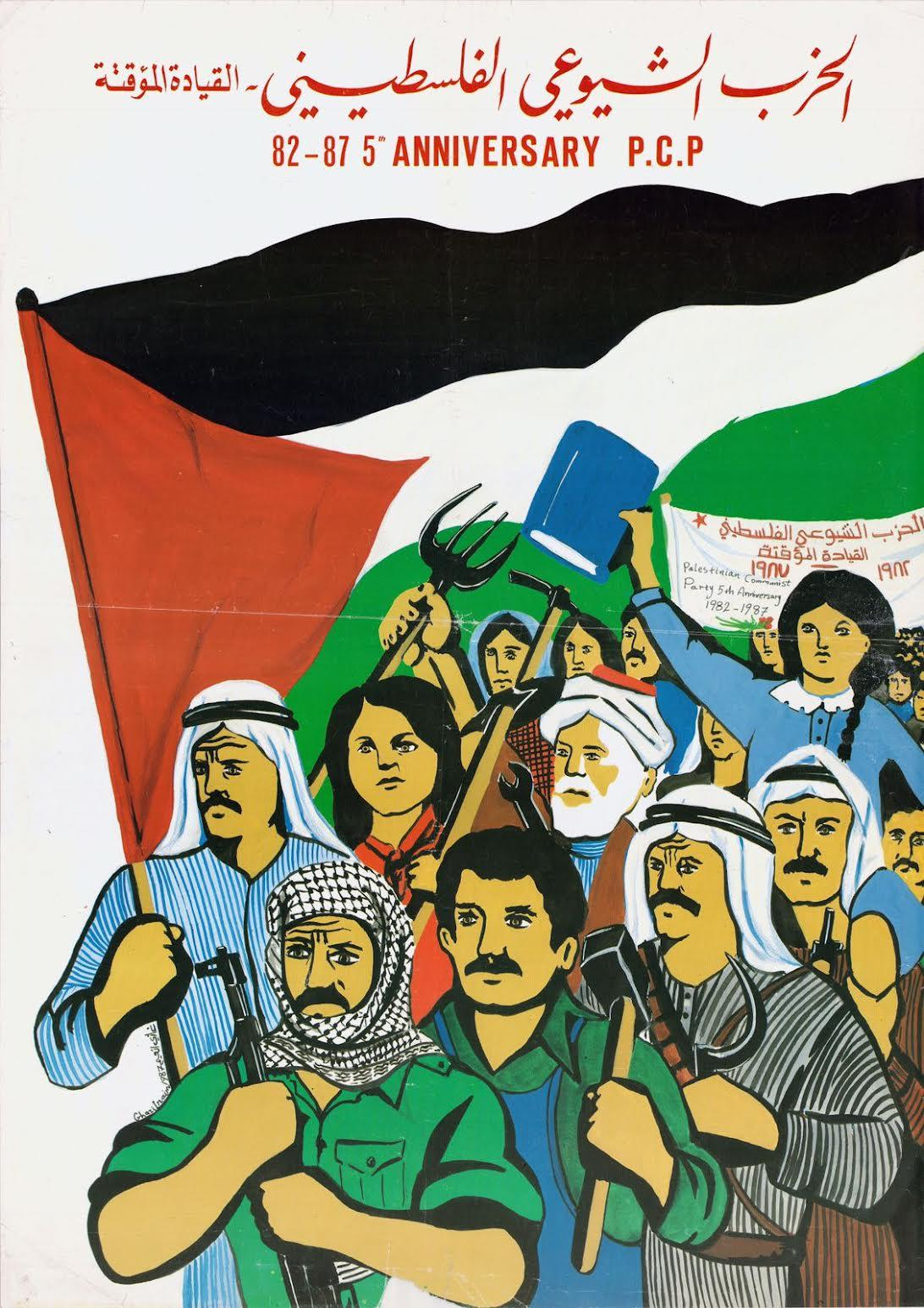
1987 poster promoting the Palestinian Communist Party.

According to former Le Monde diplomatique editor Alain Gresh, "the role of the Palestinian Communist Party (PCP) is one of the most important and least understood aspects of the Intifada." According to Daniel Finn of Jacobin, "in many ways, the first intifada was the high point of left-wing influence in Palestinian politics."

The shift towards mass organising was initially led by the PCP. According to Julie M. Norman, the Communist Party was "unique at the time in concentrating their work inside the territories, focusing on popular participation, and advocating for nonviolent approaches to resistance across Palestinian society," with its strategies increasingly being copied by the leftist Popular Front for the Liberation of Palestine and Democratic Front for the Liberation of Palestine, and eventually by Fatah, the largest and most well-resourced Palestinian faction. The Communist Party was also the first Palestinian faction to support a two-state solution to the Israeli-Palestinian conflict. According to British journalist Helena Cobban, this advocacy of a two-state solution and nonviolence resulted in communist-affiliated Palestinian labour unions being relatively less repressed by the Israeli government, allowing them more room to grow and gain influence compared to the unions affiliated to armed PLO groups. According to Musa Budeiri of Birzeit University, the outbreak of the Intifada "seemed to vindicate the party's faith in the power of popular organisation and non-violent protest," with the PCP assuming "a primary role in the ensuing developments which would eventually lead to Israeli-Palestinian negotiations at Madrid and the conclusion of a transitional peace agreement at Oslo in 1993 and mutual Israeli-Palestinian recognition."

According to Linda Tabar of Birzeit University, the shift towards mass mobilisation "began with the formation of the voluntary work movement that was established by the communists," saying that "the movement set out to provide a popular people's alternative to the services and institutions (i.e. such as the municipalities) that were linked to the colonial apparatus" and that "the decentralised, democratic formations that were set up by the voluntary movement inspired and became the basis for the popular committees that led the first intifada." According to Michael Bröning of the Friedrich Ebert Foundation, "during the First Intifada, the PCP played an influential role in organising popular protests against the Israeli occupation of the West Bank and Gaza. The PCP's secretary general Bashir Barghouti is credited with creating one of the first 'popular committees' that steered the uprising's course."

=== Growth of women's committees ===
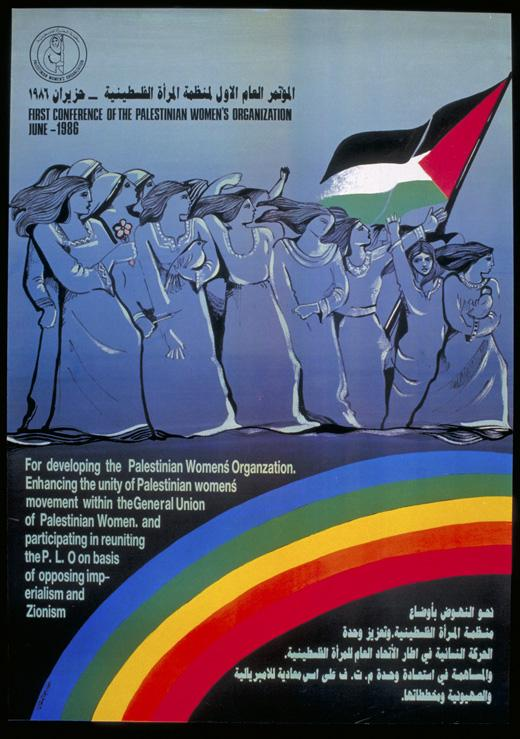
1986 poster promoting a PLO women's conference. The 1970s and 1980s saw a significant growth of women's associations in the occupied territories, and women would then play a major role in the popular committees leading the First Intifada.

As well as the Palestinian Communist Party, women's committees and student unions also played the leading roles in the shift towards mass organising. Souad Dajani of Antioch College has written that Palestinian women were "a major force behind the creation of 'alternative' structures in the Palestinian community... The concept of mass and civilian based structures was the essential feature of the Intifada that gave it its special character and power. In this, the formation and proliferation of the institutions of civil society pitted against the colonial state, enabled Palestinian women to play a pivotal role."

According to Mason Herson-Hord of In These Times, the women's committees formed throughout the 1970s and 1980s in Palestine, "allowed individual women to stretch the boundaries of patriarchal control and become more active participants in the national movement; and they laid the early foundations of the “home economy,” which fostered Palestinian self-sufficiency that would sustain boycotts and strikes during the Intifada." According to Palestinian activist Laila al-Hamdani, "the women's organisations which have developed over the past 20 years are now geared towards organising for the intifada. The popular committees, for example, are dominated by women."

=== Revitalised labour movement ===
Despite Israeli restrictions on labour organising, the number of Palestinian trade unions grew significantly over the course of the 1980s, with some commentators arguing that this growth contributed to the dynamics that sparked the Intifada. According to British author David McDowall Palestinian unions experienced a revival in the late-1970s after a decade of Israeli suppression (where only unions that had existed prior to 1967 were allowed to exist, as long as they neither held elections or recruited new members), and by the 1980s, "the resurgence of the labour union movement symbolised a new national populism which the authorities seemed unable to stifle. Trade unionism became a key element in national solidarity and social education." Lesch has noted that the Gaza Trade Union of Carpenters and Construction Workers held its internal elections in February 1987 and the Gaza Union of Workers in Commerce and Public Services in April 1987, representing the first union elections held in Gaza since the start of the occupation and held in defiance of an Israeli ban on union elections, signalling "a new level of determination and consciousness on the part of the previously moribund union movement." Farsoun and Landis have written that Israeli repression of expanding Palestinian trade unions forced those unions to organise underground, with "diffuse and quickly replaceable leadership," leading those unions to increasingly prioritise nationalist politics over class struggle.

=== Decline in influence of the PLO central leadership ===
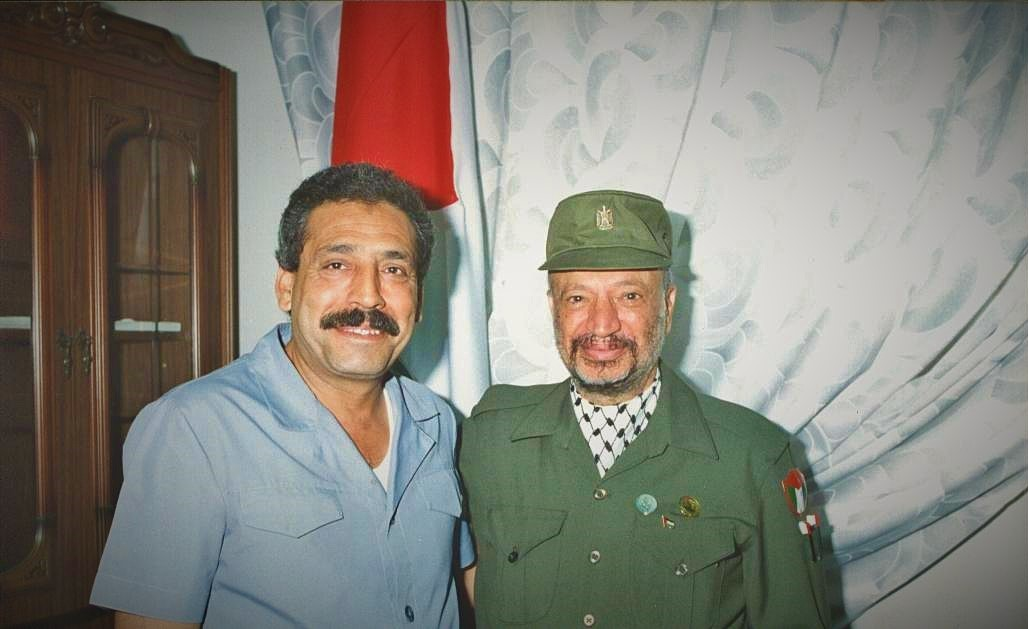
Palestine Liberation Organisation chairman Yasser Arafat being visited by a journalist in 1989. Since the early-1980s, the PLO had been forced into exile in Tunisia, after being expelled from Lebanon, where they had been based after being expelled from Jordan in the early 1970s. In exile, the PLO had little influence over the outbreak of the Intifada.

According to Saverio Leopardi, "while Fatah and Jordan tried to buy the loyalty of the OPT leadership, the leftist factions focused on developing their grassroots presence among the Palestinian masses. This approach helped reshuffle the power balance among the Palestinian factions, limiting Fatah's supremacy." According to Lustick, "the PLO's rivalry with Jordan, corruption of many of its agents in the territories, factional disputes over political strategy and the disbursement of funds, and increasingly stringent Israeli policies pushed Palestinians toward new forms of mobilization." According to Pappé, in the 1980s, the PLO's leadership was "paying the price for chronic problems within the PLO that had begun at the movement's inception. It housed a proliferation of small groups, all clients of one Arab country or another. Before the Lebanon war, this fragmentation had been disguised. However, once in Tunis, the PLO was more restricted in its ability to formulate a consensual policy, and spent more time dealing with internal rifts. In the years after the Israeli invasion of Lebanon, therefore, the Palestinian political hub moved even further away from Palestine itself, and was even less able to attract the attention or interest of the Jewish body politic in Israel."

According to Anne Marie Baylouny of the Naval Postgraduate School, "faith in solution driven by external actors, like the Palestine Liberation Organization (PLO), based in Tunis, and the Arab countries, had declined" by 1987. According to Naser-Najjab & Khatib, "the PLO had been expelled from Lebanon in 1982. This further restricted its already weak and limited ability to support Palestinians living under occupation. The limitations of external support and the ongoing situation within the Occupied Territories therefore made it clear to Palestinians that they were ultimately responsible for determining their own fate." According to former Le Monde diplomatique editor Alain Gresh, "the departure of the PLO from Beirut following the Israeli invasion of Lebanon in 1982 cut the leadership off from the last concentration of Palestinians that had provided most of the fighters and many of the cadres. This seriously weakened the capacity of Palestinians on the outside to lead the national struggle. The 1983 revolt of the Fatah dissidents and the broad split in the PLO merely reflected this disarray. The very idea of armed struggle was now in question, because for the first time since the 1967 war the PLO had no direct access to the borders of the “Zionist enemy.”"

According to Alin, Palestinians through the 1980s increasingly came to believe that, "after more than a decade of institutionalized existence and operation from exile, the leaders of the PLO, as well as their principal representatives in the territories, were developing vested political and economic interests in the national struggle, reflected in growing nepotism and corruption, and were losing touch with the everyday experiences and sentiments of the majority of West Bank and Gaza Palestinians." Shachar has noted that, during the outbreak of the Intifada, Arafat "greeted it with more apprehension than delight. The lively turmoil on the ground exposed the fiction that he and the exiled Tunis leadership planned and ran resistance in the territories. The proliferation of self-styled or, even worse, authentic leaders issuing orders and appeals on his turf was deeply worrying to him."

=== Influence of non-violent resistance ideals ===
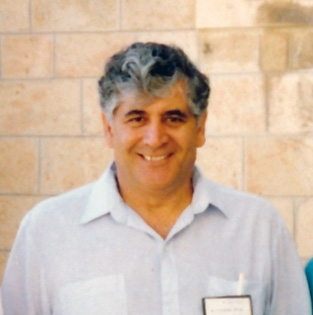
Mubarak Awad in 1993. A prominent Palestinian advocate of non-violent civil disobedience during the 1980s, his ideas would have an influence on Palestinian tactics during the First Intifada.

According to Mary King of the University for Peace, "A spread of knowledge about nonviolent strategies throughout Palestinian society for almost two decades shaped an uprising that would remain relatively coherent until March 1990, despite harsh reprisals... The movement would by its third year disintegrate into violence after Israel's incarceration, deportation, or discrediting of the very activist intellectuals who had sustained the uprising's nonviolent character and had throughout the 1970s and 1980s worked to bring about the new political thinking that produced the intifada." According to Sela, the ideal of non-violence "guided the uprising in its initial stage, but this approach ultimately collapsed under the weight of the violence and counterviolence."

Journalist Daniel Gavron has pointed towards the influence of Palestinian civil disobedience advocate Mubarak Awad, who founded the Palestinian Centre for the Study of Nonviolence in 1983, saying that "the Unified National Leadership of the Uprising never adopted his philosophy of non-violence, but most of his ideas non-cooperation and civil disobedience were implemented" during the Intifada. Canadian author David Leach has argued that the 1982 Golan Heights Druze general strike served as inspiration for the Intifada, saying that "Palestinian leaders in the Occupied Territories studied the general strike as a model of non-violent resistance. Five years later, young protestors in the West Bank and Gaza rose up - and so dawned the age of the Intifada, the "throwing off" that began in the Golan." According to Emile A. Nakhleh of Mount St. Mary's University, by the late 1980s, there was an increasing perception among Palestinians that the PLO's guerilla strategy "has run its course. Some West Bank elites have begun to voice the cautious opinion that it is time for the PLO openly and unequivocally to reject violence as a tool of liberation."

=== Growth of Islamism ===
The growth of Islamism in the occupied territories has been cited by several commentators as an instigating factor of the First Intifada. According to Kenneth W. Stein of Emory University, "in the half decade before the uprising, the mosque and Islamic symbols became focuses and platforms for political action," and "philosophies associated with the Moslem Brotherhood in Egypt emerged with some degree of prominence in a few urban areas." According to American researcher Sheila H. Katz, "The mid- 1980s saw a rise of Jewish and Muslim religious militancy that melded ultranationalism, racism, and the restriction of women's rights. Both groups categorically opposed peace and a two- state solution, each believing that they were the only legitimate citizens of Greater Israel or the whole of Palestine."

Serrill noted that "fundamentalists are especially strong in Gaza, where the teeming refugee camps have become a fertile breeding ground for the message of the Islamic sheiks. Islam is also gaining strength in the camps and universities of the West Bank. Says Efraim Sneh, an Israeli brigadier general who recently resigned as head of the West Bank Civil Administration: 'Islam is moving into the void, and it's much more difficult to combat that kind of terrorism.' Ironically, the Israelis, far from cracking down on fundamentalist activity, had until recently raised no objection to it, hoping it would turn the youth of the territories away from the P.L.O... Islamic teachers have been some of the main cheerleaders of the rioting, blaring their call to resistance from loudspeakers attached to mosques in Gaza, the West Bank and East Jerusalem. They substitute Islamic slogans for the old P.L.O. themes, chanting “Allah helps those who help themselves” or “Palestine is our Holy Land.” Their call to the barricades is made more effective by Islam's reverence for martyrdom." Israeli general Yitzhak Mordechai, head of the Southern Command when the Intifada broke out, stated in 2018 that "I was very familiar with Gaza from my previous positions. But when I took charge of the Southern Command, I was shocked by the number of mosques that had been recently constructed in Gaza." According to John Kifner of The New York Times, writing as the Intifada broke out in December 1987, there was a "strong Islamic element emerging as a major factor in this round of clashes. Islamic fundamentalist groups, including one called Islamic Holy War, have made strong gains in Gaza in the last 18 months. Loudspeakers in minarets, normally used for calls to prayers, have been urging on demonstrators."

Seyed Alavi of the SOAS University of London has argued that the growth of the Palestinian Islamic Jihad through the 1980s played a role in sparking the Intifada, saying that "from the earliest stages of the Intifada, the role of Islamic Jihad was visible," and that "the Intifada was not dominated by nationalist or secular discourses and thus marked the end of their total hegemony on the Palestinian political stage." Israeli scholar Elie Rekhess has noted that, "prior to the eruption of the uprising, the Jihad movement had stepped up its operations, causing increased tension between the population and the Israeli authorities." According to Lesch, the PIJ "not only attracted influence for its militant stance but also for its daring operations... The exploits of Islamic Jihad captured the popular imagination," which had "a major impact on galvanizing and emboldening the public."

== Changes in Palestinian-Israeli relations ==
=== Relations between Israeli and Palestinian leaderships ===
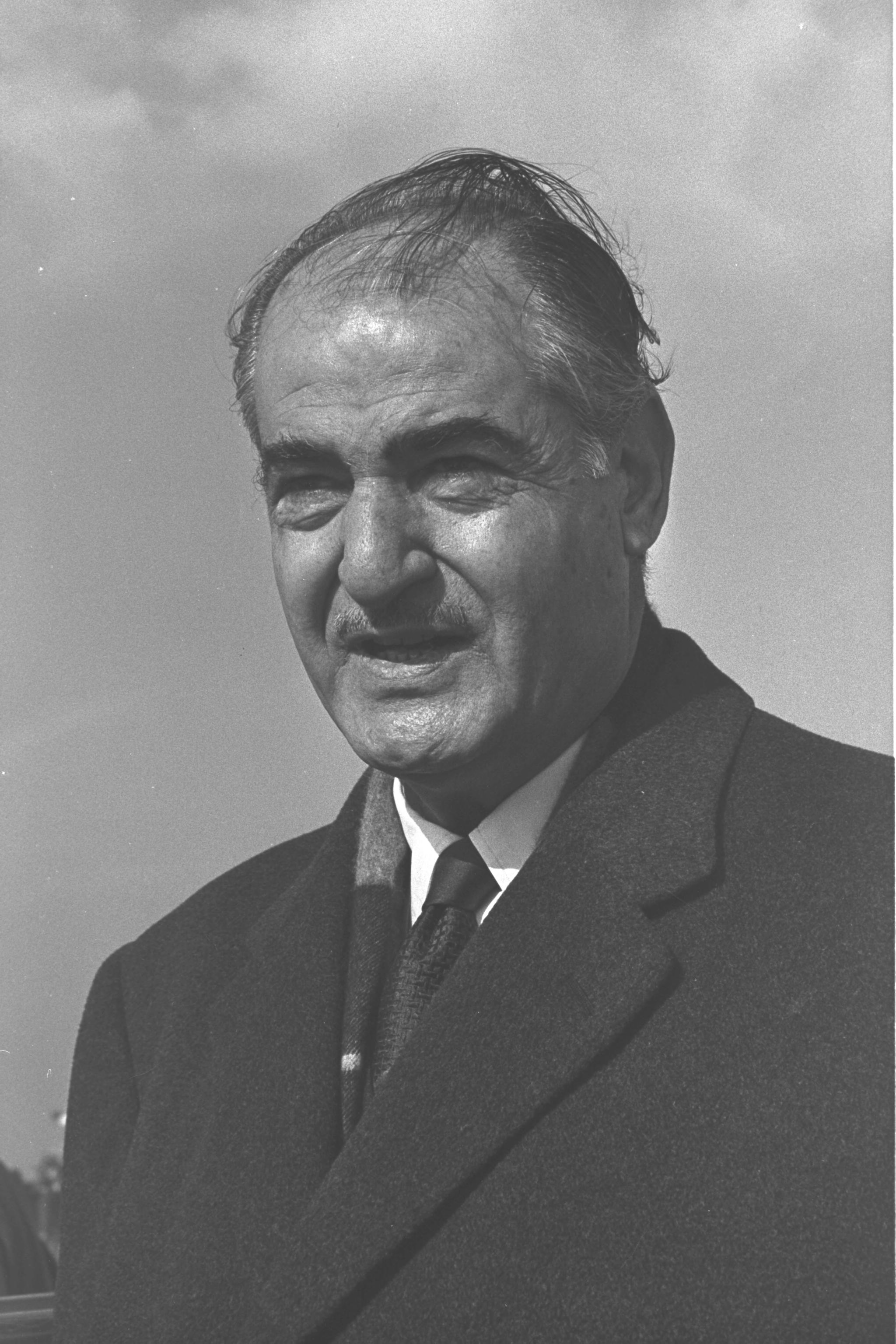
Rashad al-Shawwa in 1972. Widely considered a moderate, al-Shawwa served as mayor of Gaza City between 1971 and 1982, when he was removed and the Gaza City council dissolved by the Israeli Civil Administration.

Mandel has argued that "one root cause of the December uprising was the leadership vacuum in the territories. Israeli leaders, particularly but not only in the Labor Alignment, constantly professed readiness to negotiate with Palestinian leaders in the territories, if such persons could only be found. In practice, however, the Israeli security forces seemed bent on stifling at birth any potential emergence of a local Palestinian leadership," citing 1987 cases such as the arrests of Faisal Husseini in relation to the Amirav-Husseini peace meetings, of Arab Journalists' Association leader Radwan Abu Ayyash, and of Birzeit University student council leader Marwan Barghouti.

According to Marc D. Chaney of The New York Times, "Israelis maintain that Arab moderates who might agree to recognize Israel's right to exist in return for a homeland carved out of the occupied lands have been intimidated by the popularity of the militant positions of the P.L.O. The Israelis would prefer a state federated with Jordan, not an independent one. Moderate Palestinians say Israeli occupation policies have prevented the emergence of popular moderate leaders." Thomas L. Friedman of The New York Times referred to Palestinian journalist Ibrahim Karaeen in December 1987: "When the moderate nationalists of his generation were still ruling the West Bank as mayors or in other leadership positions, Mr. Karaeen said, they were a buffer between Israel and the more extremist and religious fundamentalists among the Palestinians. When a disturbance happened, they would mediate between the Israeli authorities and the youths to calm things down. But now this buffer group has been expelled or dismissed. In the last two weeks when the Israeli Army called in the Palestinian leaders they appointed in place of the moderate nationalists in the West Bank and told them to cool things down, these 'leaders' were not able to exert any influence."

According to Ziad Abu-Amr of Birzeit University, during the first twenty years of the occupation, the Israeli government "failed to win the sympathy or support of any meaningful sector of the occupied population. Even those social classes which have traditionally allied themselves with foreign occupations in other colonial settings (the great landlords and the compadre in China during the Japanese occupation, for example) have found themselves at constant odds with the Israeli occupation. Under an active policy of land confiscation and Jewish settlement, major Palestinian landholders have been big losers. Even the leading Palestinian merchants are restricted and have to contend with unfair competition from their Israeli counterparts, who enjoy all kinds of support from their government." According to Palestinian-American scholar Edward Said, "there were occasional, and quite unsuccessful, attempts to empower collaborationist Palestinians (e.g. the Village Leagues) who would perhaps be more amenable to doing the Israeli wish, but those never acquired anything like the credibility needed to swing a critical mass of Palestinians behind them. After a time, they were dropped and forgotten."

=== Increased Palestinian awareness of Israeli society and politics ===
According to American sociologist William A. Gamson, in the years prior to the Intifada, "many Palestinians on-the-ground - that is, living in the territories - became highly informed observers of Israeli internal politics... As is typical in such situations, the growing familiarity was not mutual; most Israelis had little reason to pay attention to internal Palestinian developments." American anthropologist Lila Abu-Lughod has argued that the generation of Palestinians who grew up under Israeli occupation were more realistic in their aims than the PLO members in exile and had a stronger understanding of Israeli "intentions, policies, practices, and powers." According to Nakhleh, "West Bank elites have become more cognizant of the moods and attitudes of the Israeli Jewish public and have endeavored, albeit on a limited basis, to communicate with its various sectors."

According to Alimi, "the opening of Israel's market to Palestinian workers, the fact that many Palestinians became familiar with Israeli democracy and mastered the Hebrew language, yet the fact that the Israeli political system was totally closed to Palestinians’ participation, shaped, to a large extent, the forms and contours of any future self-generated Palestinian resistance." According to Alin, "the majority of Palestinian migrant workers commuted daily to Israel, where they encountered new levels of economic prosperity and social and political liberties. At the same time, in relation to their Israeli counterparts, Palestinian workers were paid less, had fewer benefits, and were barred from more skilled and higher paying jobs." According to Shalev, "studies show that political violence does not necessarily arise from a situation of relative or even absolute poverty, but is generated by the emergence or formation of a gap between expectations and reality due to changes in one or both of these variables. Thus on the one hand, demographic trends had produced a steady deterioration in the Gaza Strip refugees’ living conditions, while on the other hand, expectations of change had increased, if only because of the disparity between the refugees’ conditions and what they saw while working in Israel."

=== Decline in Israeli ability to suppress Palestinian demonstrations ===
The 1980s saw a significant increase in the number of demonstrations undertaken by Palestinians, with Baylouny stating that "in the period from 1977 to 1982, an average of 500 such protest events took place per year. From 1982 to the start of the uprising, the average increased to between 3,000 and 4,000 annually." According to Thomas L. Friedman, "between 1977 and 1984 there were 11 internal Palestinian demonstrations for every externally generated [terrorist] attack. In 1985 the ratio became 16 to 1 and in 1986 it rose to 18 to 1."

According to Bregman, between April 1986 and May 1987, an average of 81 Palestinians in the West Bank were arrested each week by the Israeli military for participating in demonstrations and other actions deemed by the Israeli government to be terrorism. Bregman also noted that, by 1987, Palestinian demonstrators had become "bolder and more daring than in the past," saying that "Israeli troops on the ground realised that methods which had been used in the past to dispel demonstrations were not, on the eve of the Intifada, as effective as they had previously been. Firing into the air, for instance, which had in the past caused Palestinian protestors to scatter, was no longer effective; neither was the method commonly used to disperse college girls, which was for an Israeli soldier to open his fly and begin tugging down his pants." Shalev has listed the loss of the IDF's deterrent profile as one of the main causes of the Intifada, noting that incidents like the funeral of Zafer al-Masri in 1986, that developed into a major nationalist demonstration, and a march by Birzeit University staff and students in early 1987, engendered an impression among Palestinians that "they controlled the street: if the masses could organize and rally to the flag, the Jews would be forced to beat a retreat."

=== Imprisonment of Palestinians by Israel ===
A significant number of Palestinians in the occupied territories experienced arrest and incarceration by Israeli forces between 1967 and 1987, a factor that several commentators have cited as contributing to the outbreak of the First Intifada. According to historian Mustafa Kabha, "during the period of 1967-1985, Israel had arrested nearly 250 000 people, 40 percent of whom were detained for longer than one night." Peretz wrote that "discontent with deteriorating economic and social conditions has been politicized in what the Israeli press has characterized as 'schools of hatred': the Israeli prisons and detention centers where tens of thousands have been held, for periods ranging from a day to a decade or more.

According to Saverio Leopardi, "the rise of activists arrested, notably since the 1985 launch of the Iron Fist policy, turned the Israeli prisons into veritable political schools where the detainees organized themselves according to their political affiliation. Younger detainees received training from more experienced militants in ideology, resistance activities and structure of the Palestinian national movement. The Israeli prisons thus shaped a new generation of leaders, the generation that constituted the backbone of the Intifada." According to Norman, Palestinian prisoners increasingly adopted collective action in the years leading to the Intifada, including holding elections among themselves to create "multi-level representational committees, allowing for communication and coordination within and between prisons. Although communications were officially forbidden, prisoners managed to organize hunger strikes and utilize other nonviolent tactics such as banging on bars, using forbidden items, and refusing to address soldiers formally."

Fatah militant Qadura Fares, incarcerated during the 1980s, has written that arrests of youth particularly contributing to this political schooling: "prisons released young people who were already university students. They learned from their years in prison, and went out to continue their education... They were known for and categorised by their political affiliations; Fatah, the Popular Front or others. Keeping affiliations a secret was not necessary. This helped the former prisoners and earned them the students' trust. They were older and had more political and intellectual awareness, and thus got elected to the student councils. Look at the names of student council members in all universities at that time, you will find that most of them were former prisoners. These youths transformed the role of university student councils, from that of a union to a national organising role. Universities and prisons became incubators for the Palestinian movement, producing new leaders and cadres defying the occupation."

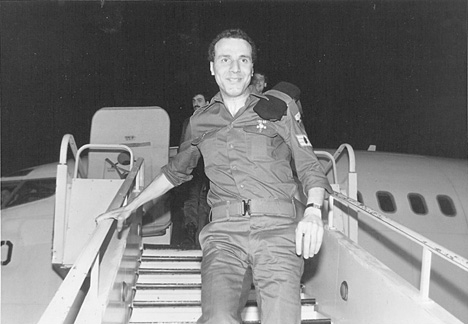
Israeli soldier Hezi Shai returning from captivity in 1985. Shai and two other Israeli soldiers had been captured by Palestinian militants and were released in the Jibril Agreement in exchange for the release of 1150 Palestinian prisoners held by Israel.

Israeli general Yitzhak Mordechai, head of the Southern Command when the First Intifada broke out, has cited the 1985 prisoner-exchange Jibril Agreement, during which over a thousand Palestinians detained by Israel, including many militants, were released, as contributing to the outbreak of the Intifada. Israeli author Nadav Shragai has argued that the Palestinians released in the Jibril Agreement "became the backbone of the first intifada." Yuval Diskin, who served as a Shabak coordinator in the occupied territories when the Intifada broke out, has stated that "the release of the prisoners in the Jibril Agreement was the main cause of the processes that led to the First Intifada. I was there in the field and we felt it every day. The mass of prisoners who were released built a new extremist and activist leadership. This, together with the elation and the feeling that they had succeeded in bending the State of Israel, led to an explosion."

=== Increasing Israeli settlement in the Palestinian Territories ===
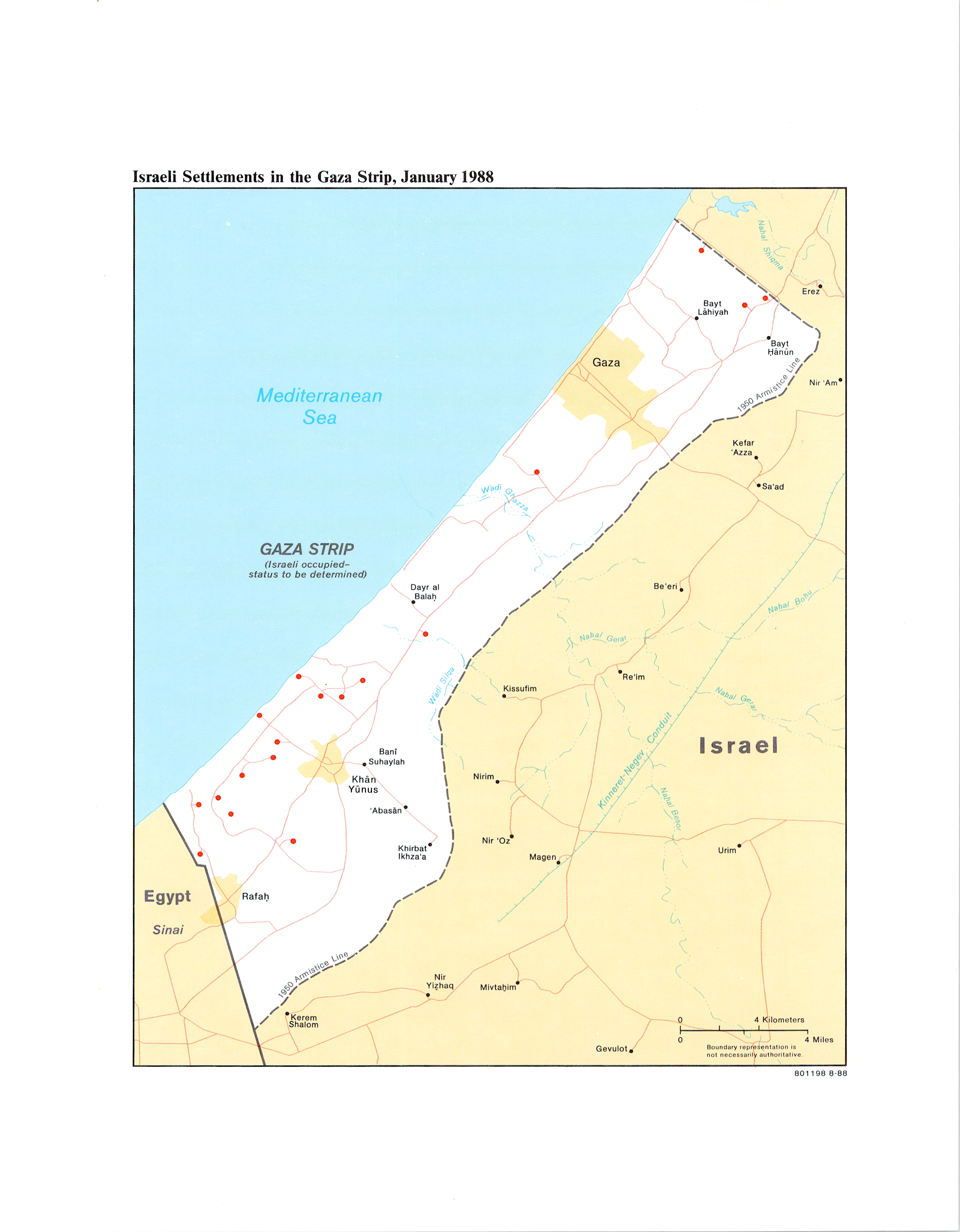
Map of Israeli settlements in the Gaza Strip in 1988. Israeli settlement in the occupied territories increased significantly during the 1980s.

The increasing rate of Israeli settlement in the Palestinian Territories has been cited as a significant factor contributing to outbreak of the First Intifada, particularly due to fears among the Palestinian population that growing settlement would eventually lead to their expulsion from Palestine and due to increased clashes between settlers and Palestinians. According to Marc D. Chaney of The New York Times, "at first, Labor Governments attempted to limit the pattern of settlement to one that more heavily reflected security concerns than links to history, appearing to leave room for territorial compromise. After 1977, when the right-wing Likud bloc came to power, encouragement was given to groups that seek to retain all the occupied territories as part of the ancient land of Israel."

Peretz stated that "the population of the occupied territories has been increasing at a rapid rate, faster than anticipated by Palestinian or Israeli demographers, resulting in teeming villages, towns and refugee camps. Stifling pressures of life in this cramped environment have been exacerbated by policies that restrict the expansion of Arab urban areas and have placed some 50 percent of land and most water sources under Israeli control, frequently at the disposal of the new Jewish settlers." According to Rabbani and Hajjar, by 1988, "There are 2,500 Jewish settlers in Gaza, 0.4 percent of the total Gaza population. These Jewish settlers consume 19 times more water per capita than their Palestinian neighbors. These settlers have on average 2.6 acres each; Gaza Palestinians have .006 acres each." According to Butt, the settler population in the West Bank almost doubled between 1984 and 1988.

Nakhleh claimed that Israeli military checkpoints in the occupied Palestinian territories were at times manned by civilian settlers; "Many of these are teenagers, brandishing their weapons while the police watch. Indeed, one always sees a police car parked close to where these settlers search cars and check identity cards." Shortly prior to the outbreak of the Intifada, former Israeli Minister of Foreign Affairs Abba Eban warned that Israeli settlers "have a totally different set of rights and immunities" to Palestinians, creating "a society in the West Bank and Gaza in which a man's rights are defined not by his conduct or by any egalitarian principle, but by his ethnic identity."

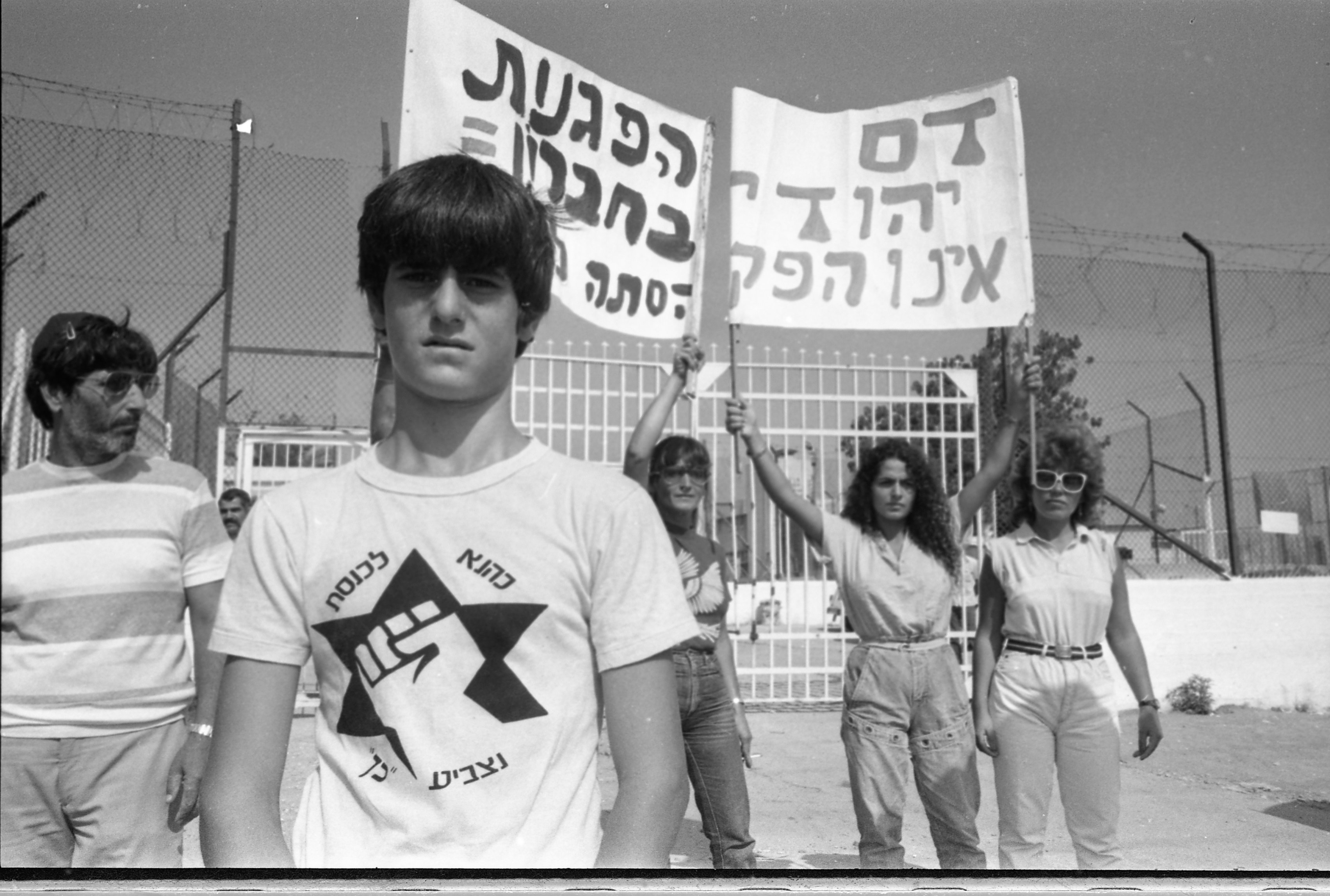
1984 demonstration in Israel in support of the Jewish Underground. The Jewish Underground were a far-right group that carried out a number of attacks on Palestinians in the early 1980s.

Zeev Maoz of the University of California, Davis has argued that the emergence of violent settler extremism, notably the Jewish Underground, in the late 1970s "complicated matters in the occupied territories," noting that settlers in the territories were not subject to the Defence (Emergency) Regulations applied to Palestinians and that the members of the Jewish Underground convicted of murder were pardoned after serving relatively short sentences. According to journalists Ronen Bergman and Mark Mazzetti, "reprisal attacks between settlers and Palestinians were an increasing problem" throughout the 1980s, with Israeli intelligence finding it increasingly difficult to infiltrate extremist settler groups after Gush Emunim fractured and to deter settler attacks on Palestinians, "with little police presence in the occupied territories and a powerful interest group ensuring that whoever was charged for the violence was released with a light sentence."

According to Juan Tamayo of The Canberra Times, writing in December 1987, "If Israelis dismiss Rabbi Meir Kahane's proposals to expel all Arabs as being extremist, Palestinians see them as their future." According to Mandel, the implications of the growth in the Palestinian population led to Kahanism enjoying a "growing legitimacy" in Israeli public discourse, noting statements by two Israeli ministers that appeared to suggest that the Israeli government should support Palestinians wishing to emigrate outside of the occupied territories.

== Stalled peace process ==
=== Failure of peace negotiations ===
Israeli political scientist Yitzhak Reiter has argued that "the major cause of the uprising was the deadlock in negotiating the Palestinian demands to Israel's end of occupation in the West Bank and Gaza and the establishment of a Palestinian independent state." Mark Tessler of the University of Michigan has written that, following the failure of the 1982 Reagan peace plan, "active American, Arab, Jordanian-Palestinian, and Israeli diplomatic efforts had been unable even to get peace negotiations started. Although many observers perceived a genuine sense of urgency, and while Arafat, Hussein, and Peres had all labored tirelessly and with sincere dedication from their respective and differing perspectives, none of the various initiatives, plans, dialogues, and agreements of the preceding four years had produced a formula for peace acceptable to all major parties. The failed diplomacy of this period thus left knowledgeable observers in the region and elsewhere deeply worried."

According to Lev Luis Grinberg of the Ben-Gurion University of the Negev, "the agreements with Egypt left the relations with the Palestinian people unresolved. Although the legitimate claims of the Palestinians were recognized in the ‘Framework for Peace in the Middle East’, the proposal to establish autonomous authorities for a five-year interim period was very vague, and never implemented." According to Jacob Høigilt of the Fafo Foundation, "a sense of standstill and loss of direction in the political process" was a significant trigger of the Intifada, as "Israel had no clear idea of what to do with the occupied territories, and resorted to day-to-day military management of them. The political process was non-existent, the Reagan plan of Palestinian autonomy in association with Jordan having been rejected first by Israel, then by the Palestinian National Council in 1982."

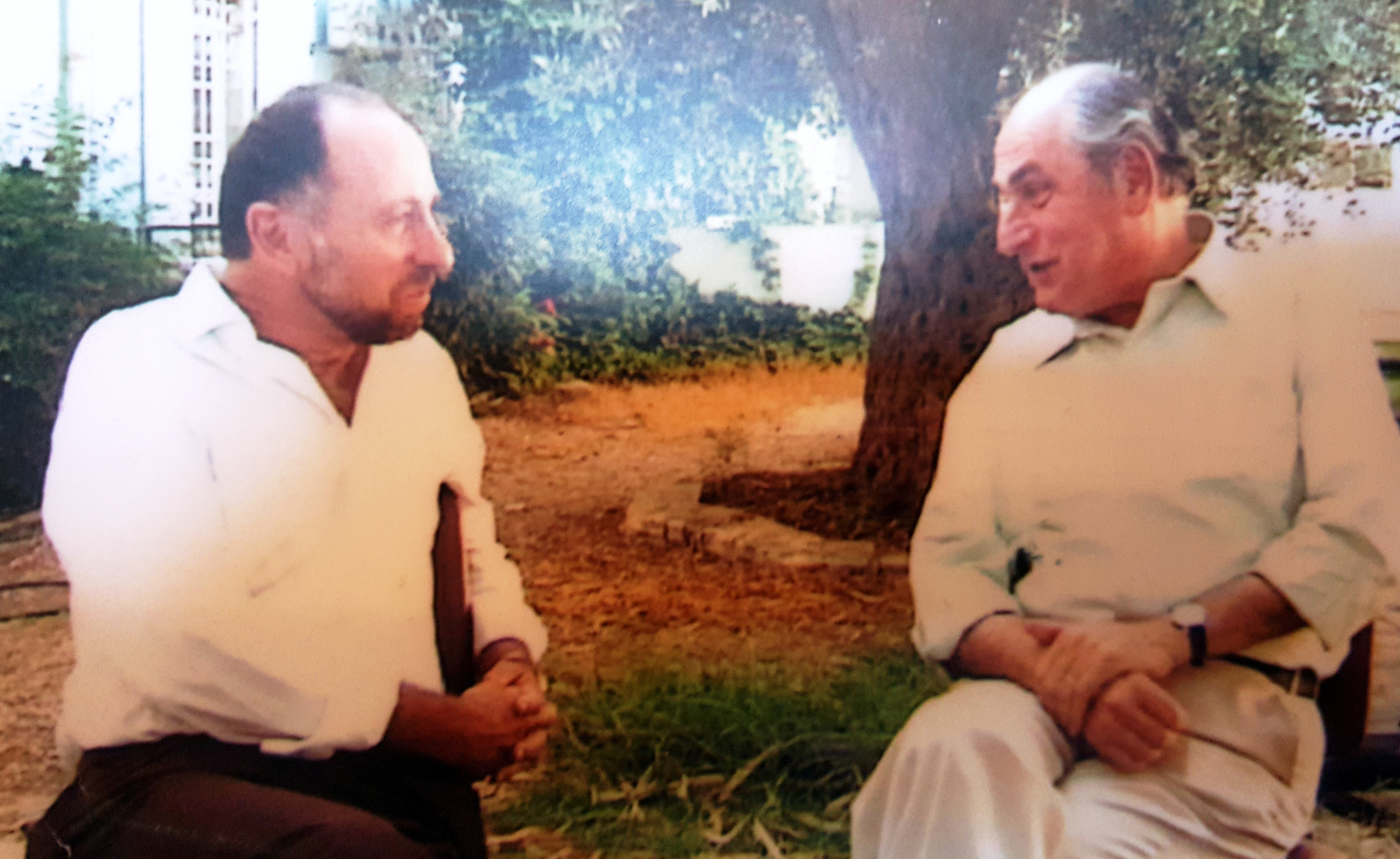
Moshe Amirav and Faisal Husseini. The Amirav-Husseini peace meetings in mid-1987 ended in failure.

According to Naser-Najjab & Khatib, by 1987, "the occupation had been in place for two decades, and there was no solution on the horizon. Israeli politicians refused to acknowledge, much less engage, Palestinian political representatives. Politicians from Israel's more moderate Labor Party, such as Rabin and Shimon Peres, viewed the so-called Jordanian option (where Jordan would accept responsibility over some of the Occupied Territories in lieu of a Palestinian state) as the most realistic option for the resolution of the conflict." Pappé has pointed towards the failure of the Peres–Hussein London Agreement in mid-1987, which failed due to internal opposition within the Israeli cabinet, as permanently ending chances for Jordanian involvement in resolving the conflict and as leaving direct negotiations between Israelis and Palestinians as the only viable option.

Israeli journalist Shalom Yerushalmi has pointed towards the failure of a mid-1987 series of secret peace meetings initiated by Israeli activist David Ish Shalom, well-connected Likud member Moshe Amirav, senior PLO member Faisal Husseini, and Palestinian academic Sari Nusseibeh that collapsed after Husseini was suddenly arrested by the Israeli military and Amirav subsequently being expelled from Likud, saying that "I assume that the disappointment and frustration from the unsigned agreement was one of the factors that led to the outbreak of the intifada."

=== Decline of American peacemaking influence in the Middle East ===
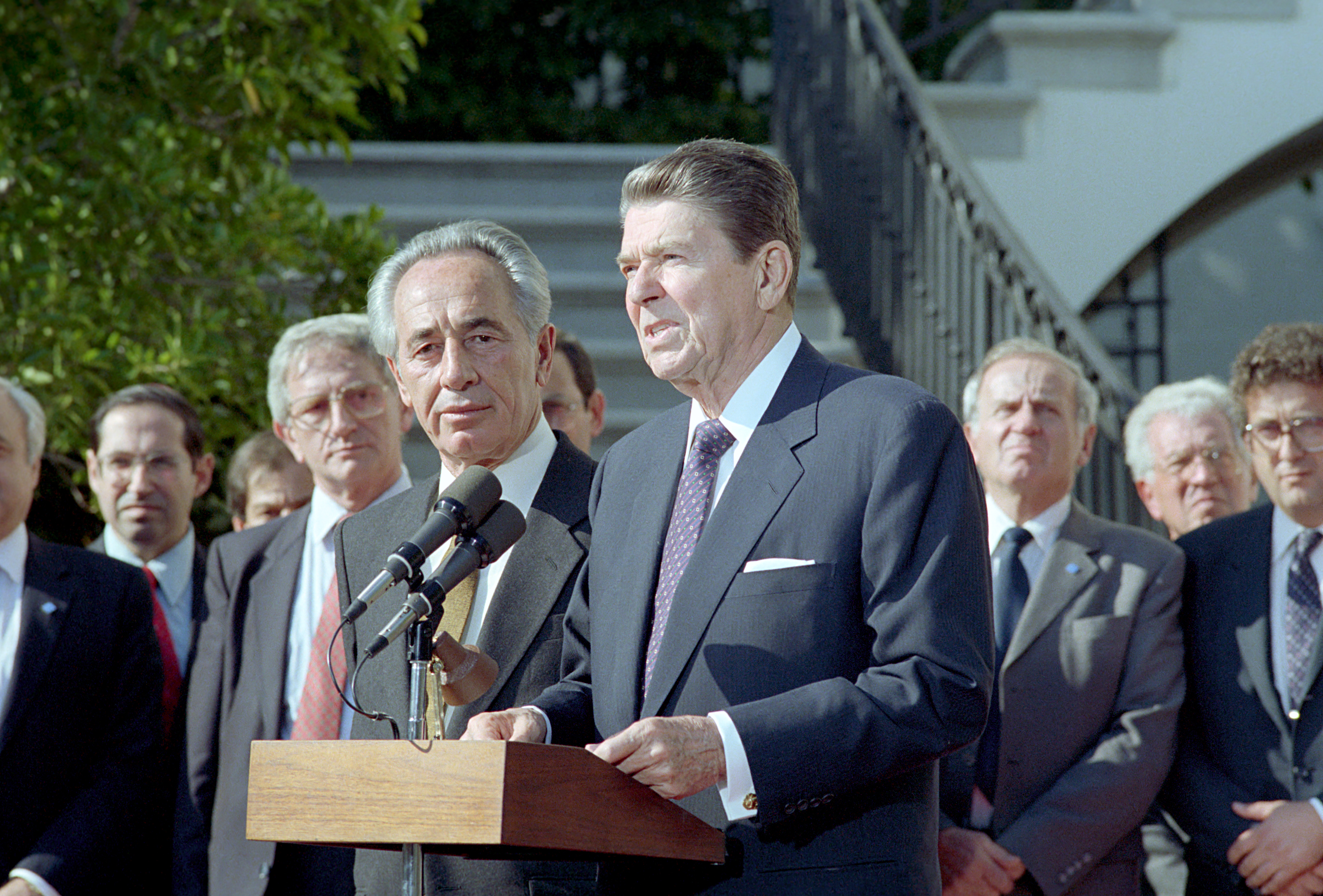
American President Ronald Reagan and Israeli Prime Minister Shimon Peres in 1985.

Some commentators have suggested that the American government under Ronald Reagan and his Secretary of State George Shultz underwent a decline in peacemaking influence in the Middle East following the failure of the 1982 Reagan Peace Plan, contributing to the tensions that led to the outbreak of the Intifada. Palestinian-American scholar Edward Said has argued that increased American support for Israel under Reagan's presidency allowed the Israeli government to overlook increasing internal debates in Israeli society over its occupation policies. Mandel argued that the American's government's perception that the more hardline Yitzhak Shamir dominated the Israeli coalition over Shimon Peres "combined with the Reagan administration's own domestic problems, its reluctance to be seen as intervening in Israeli internal affairs, and the consistently vacillating attitude it had shown toward the Middle East crisis in general, meant that concrete progress toward peace was all but ruled out in 1987." William B. Quandt of the Brookings Institution warned in February 1988 that "Between 1974 and 1979, the US was unusually active in promoting Arab-Israeli peace talks. Five formal agreements were signed. Since then, the US role has been more low-key, often focusing on procedural issues... the US has lost credibility as an Arab-Israeli peacemaker in recent years, particularly with Arab parties." According to Deborah Gerner of the University of Kansas, during the 1980s, "the United States has been a far more important actor than the Soviet Union in affecting the course of the Arab-Israeli conflict. Yet for all its involvement, the United States has failed to assist in the resolution of Palestinian demands."

== Changes in Palestinian-Arab relations ==
=== Declining relations between Palestinians and Jordan ===
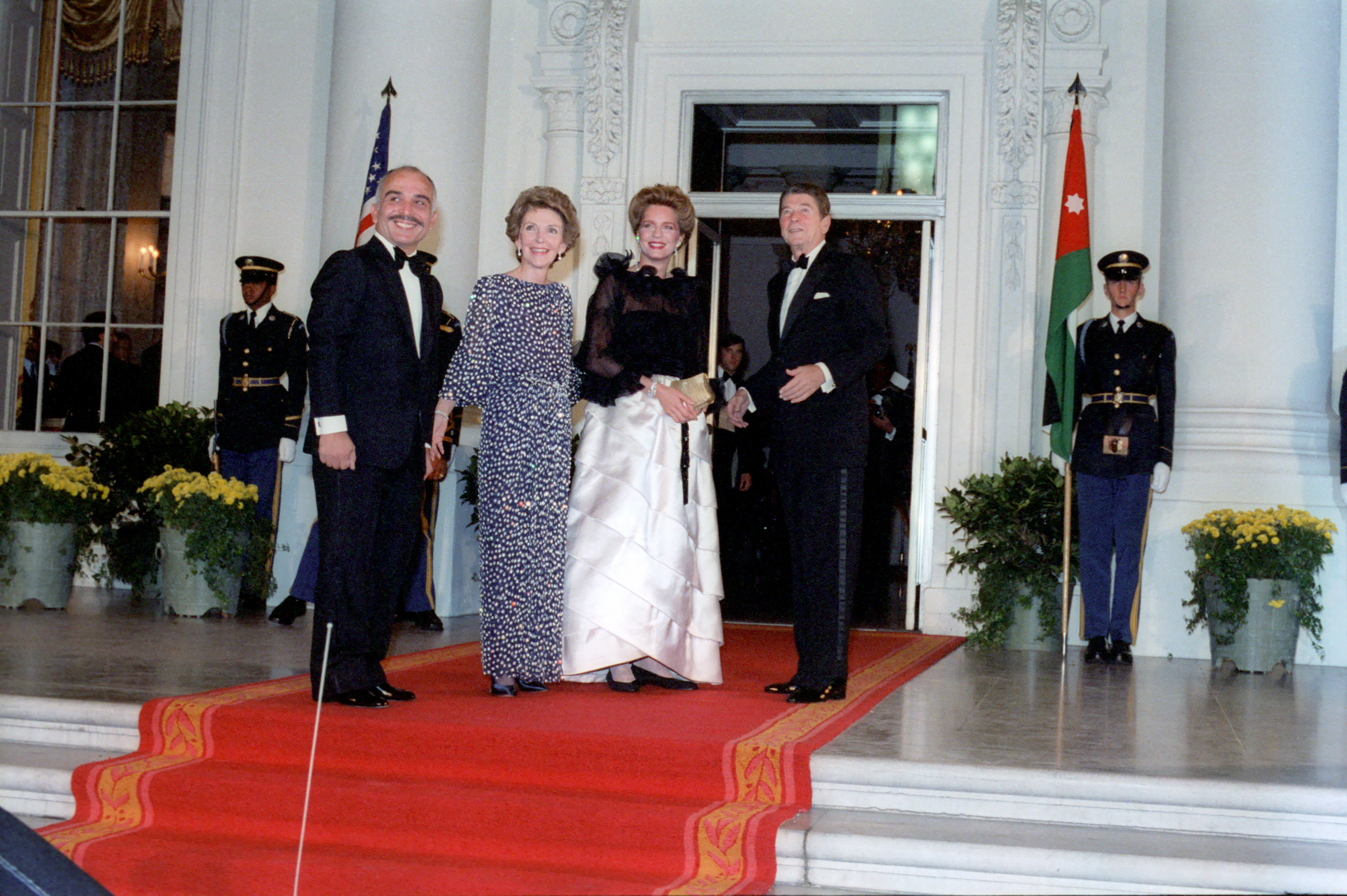
King Hussein of Jordan visiting the United States in 1981.

Kabha has suggested that "Jordan also played a part in weakening the economy of the territories and increasing its dependence on Israel," pointing towards the Jordanian government's cuts to payments of Palestinian teachers' salaries and of the shutdown of the Jordanian government committee that oversaw donations from richer Arab states to Palestinians. According to Youssef M. Ibrahim of The New York Times, while wealthier Palestinians in Jordan had integrated into Jordanian society, "many Palestinians say they are treated as second class citizens," and the consensus among poorer Palestinian refugees in Jordan was "that all Palestinian refugees must return to their land in Palestine." According to the FACTS Information Committee, a popular committee formed with the goal of presenting the UNLU's perspectives to the media during the Intifada, the Jordanian option was widely opposed by Palestinians because "under the best of circumstances it would only amount to a division of political tutelage over the Palestinian people between Israel and Jordan. What has assisted in the rejection of the Jordanian option is that the masses in the occupied territories still remember the bitterness of political repression they endured during Jordanian rule over the West Bank. Jordan's persistent attempts to suppress the political and national identity of the Palestinian people are still very fresh in the collective memory."

Pearlman has noted that during the late 1970s and 1980s, "Israel was not alone in opposing the new Palestinian leadership and institution-building in the occupied territories. Jordan likewise intervened to bolster conservative leaders at the expense of pro-PLO mayors." Peter David of Chatham House noted that the Jordanian option had become "something of a mirage even before the intifada," citing the overwhelming defeat of pro-Jordanian candidates in the 1976 West Bank local elections and that Hussein's pre-Intifada attempt "to reassert his influence on the West Bank by launching an economic development plan for the occupied areas quickly faded away to nothing." Hiroyuki Suzuki of the University of Tokyo has written that, while the PLO and Jordan attempted to forge an alliance in the mid-1980s following the 1982 Lebanon War, by 1987 those attempts had collapsed, with Jordan suspending negotiations in 1986, infightning between different PLO factions, and a decline in Jordanian influence over the politics of the occupied territories.

=== Declining Palestinian relations with other Arab states ===
According to Peretz, there was a "feeling of abandonment by the outside world" among Palestinians in the late 1980s, "particularly by their Arab brethren, who did little to end the recent 'War of the Camps', in Lebanon where Palestinians, many of them relatives of those in the occupied territories, were besieged for months by the Shi‘ite Amal militia. The Arab League summit in Amman during November 1987 produced little apparent support for the Palestinians. Although the meeting was convened to deal with the Gulf war, Palestinians in the territories perceived the secondary attention it devoted to their problem as a slight, an attempt to avoid confronting the Palestinian issue head on." Naser-Najjab & Khatib have argued that the Iran-Iraq War "pushed the Palestinian issue to the bottom of the list of regional priorities" for Arab states, with the 1987 Arab League Summit focusing on "condemning Iran and reintegrating Egypt into the Arab fold after it had been kicked out of the Arab League for signing a separate peace with Israel. Many Palestinians felt that the international community and key Arab states had abandoned them." According to Mandel, "the sense of frustration and despair in the territories was heightened by King Hussein's humiliating treatment of Yasir Arafat at the meeting and by the almost total disregard of the Palestinian issue by the Arab leaders, who were concerned primarily with the Gulf War."

Jane Friedman of The Christian Science Monitor wrote in December 1987 that the outbreak of the unrest "reinforce the Arab view that Egypt is unable to moderate Israel's policies or to bring about a settlement to the Palestinian problems, despite its diplomatic ties," quoting an Egyptian official as saying that there had been other incidents that had embarrassed the Egyptian government's stance on the Israeli-Palestinian conflict, notably the 1982 Sabra and Shatila massacre and the 1985 Operation Wooden Leg.

Jim Lederman of Foreign Policy wrote in 1988 that, with the early 1980s oil recession, "Palestinians, who had always been viewed by the gulf's rulers as a potential source of political unrest, were less welcome than they had been in the past." Alan Cowell of The New York Times wrote in December 1987 that Palestinians in Egypt, "as in many parts of the Arab world, are seen as outsiders whose presence evokes fearful memories of violence and unruliness in places like Lebanon and Jordan, and there has sometimes been confrontation." American foreign affairs analyst Robin Wright wrote in January 1988 that "Palestinians admit that they are often the outcasts, both envied and feared by other Arabs." Shachar has noted that "The 1948–49 Palestinian refugees were often received appallingly in theArab capitals around which they flocked. According to local, government-directed media, eager to absolve the national Arab armies from the débâcle which led to the creation of Israel, the Palestinians had not stood their ground but abandoned their homeland to the Jews, sold it, betrayed it. Now, forty years later, the refugees and their struggle were glorified in the Arab world."

== Changes in Israeli politics and society ==
=== Shift of the Israeli government towards the right ===
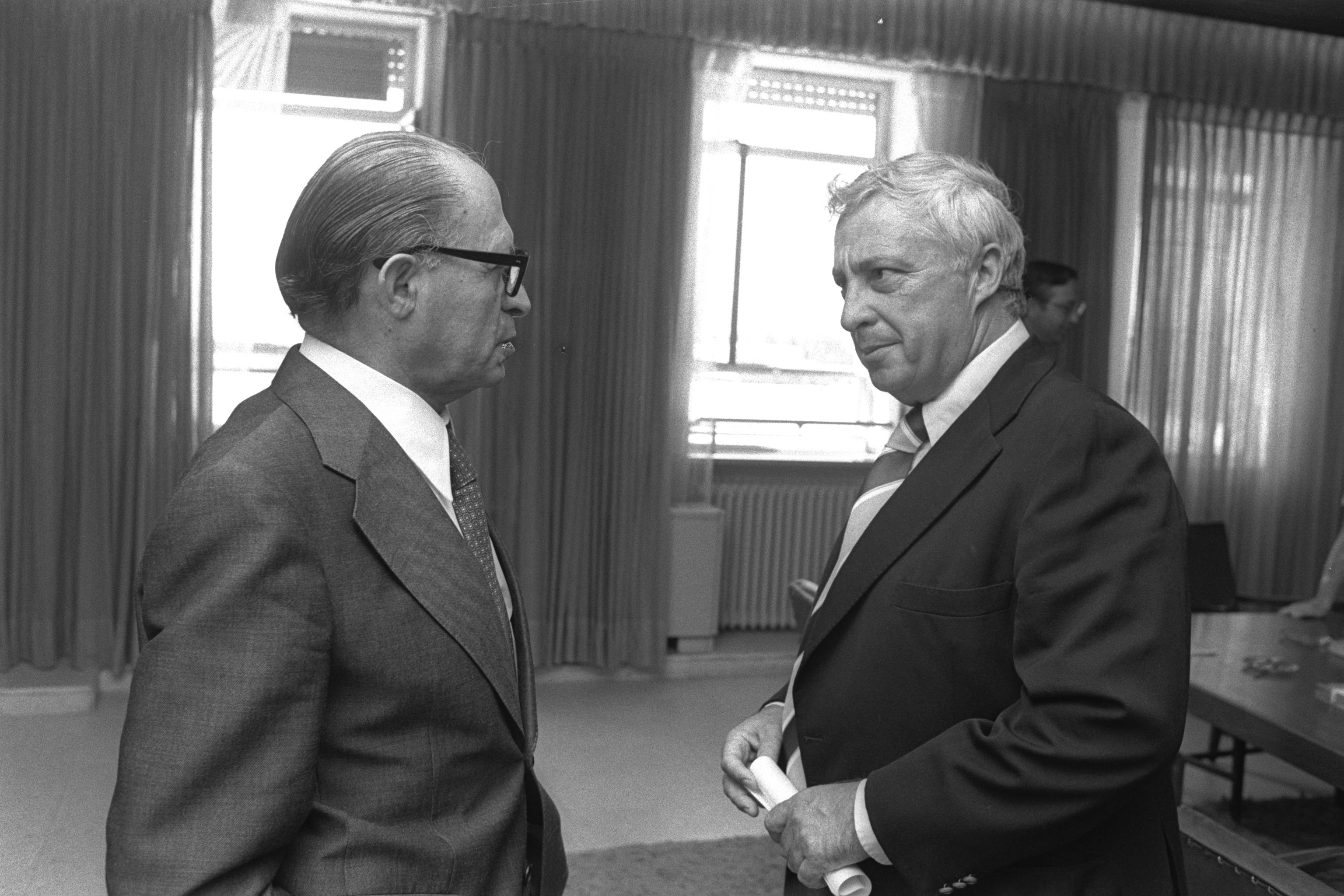
Prime Minister Menachem Begin and Minister of Agriculture Ariel Sharon in 1977. They were both key players in Israel's first-ever Likud government.

Some commentators have suggested that the election of Menachem Begin's Likud in the 1977 Israeli legislative electiondirectly contributed to the outbreak of the Intifada. Alimi has argued that, beginning the late 1970s, the occupation policies of the Israeli government shifted towards becoming "much more dominant over the Palestinian population by imposing and maintaining order through force and violence," including use of the Defence (Emergency) Regulations leftover from British rule. Alin has argued that Begin's government represented a intruded more and more into the everyday lives of Palestinians, leading Palestinians to increasingly perceive the occupation as a direct threat. According to Pearlman, the Likud government under Begin launched "a series of policies that expanded curfew and restrictions on political activity, universities, and the press, as well as more forceful military repression," as well as outlawing the National Guidance Committee and dismantling elected Palestinian city councils in 1982.

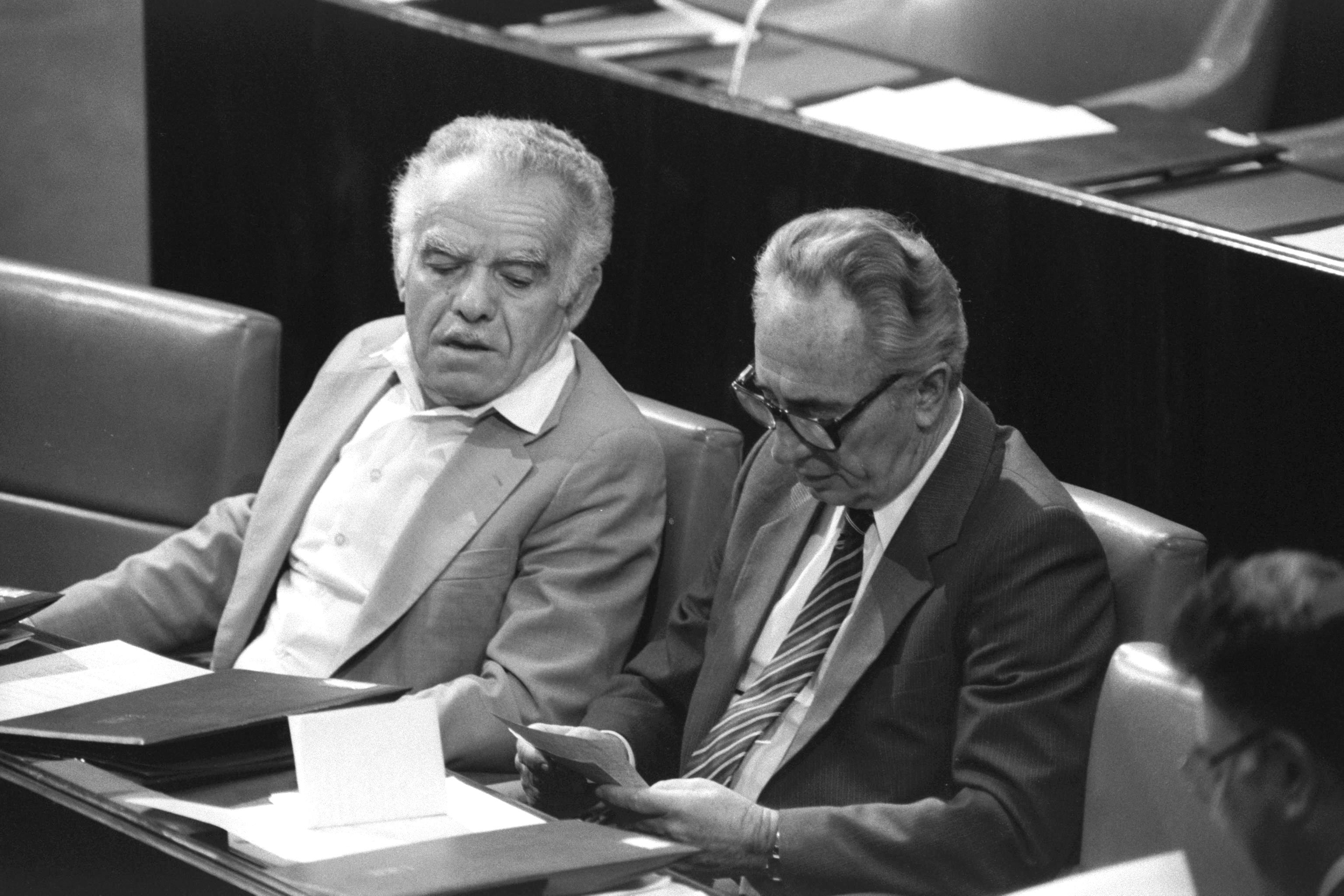
Yitzhak Shamir of Likud and Shimon Peres of the Labor Party in 1985. Together, they led the Israeli government between 1984 and 1990, with frequent disagreements over plans for the future of the Israeli occupation of the Palestinian territories.

According to American-Palestinian journalist Ramzy Baroud, the grand coalition between Likud and the Israeli Labor Party following the 1984 Israeli legislative election "constituted the worst possible combination from the point of view of Palestinians in the Occupied Territories. While Yitzhak Shamir and Shimon Peres served the role of the hardliner and peace 'dove' respectively before the international community, both men and their government presided over a legacy saturated with violence, illegal annexation of Palestinian land and settlement expansion." Madel has noted that "in 1987 public affairs in Israel were dominated by an unremitting clash between Prime Minister Yitzhak Shamir and Vice Premier and Foreign Minister Shimon Peres over the idea of an international peace conference." English historian Colin Shindler has written that "Shamir never accepted the proposition of ‘land for peace’, and he worked hard to prevent those who did from implementing it. Shamir's concern therefore was not the Palestinian rejectionists, but those Palestinians who projected a more moderate line. Shamir was vigilant in preventing Peres – now Foreign Minister in the rotational government – from allowing the PLO entry into any negotiations by the back door."

The role of Yitzhak Rabin, a Labor Party member and Minister of Defence under the grand coalition, has particularly been remarked upon by several commentators. British journalist Helena Cobban has argued that the 1985 establishment of the Iron Fist policy by Rabin, including a significant increase in the number of Palestinians deported from the occupied territories, "must be considered an essential seed in the germination of the intifada." According to Mark Tessler of the University of Michigan, "in the opinion of a number of observers, among them Israelis associated with the peace camp, Rabin's rule of the territories was actually more oppressive than that of his predecessors from Likud, including Sharon as well as Moshe Arens, and was itself a cause of heightened tension among Palestinians in the West Bank and Gaza." Efraim Inbar of Bar-Ilan University has written that Rabin "was generally accepted as an authority on security matters. The political constellation of the late 1980s allowed him to be the final arbiter in affairs pertaining to the IDF, its use in the territories and outside it, with little interference from other cabinet members. His perceptions of the situation and his prescriptions constituted the most influential input in forming the Israeli response to the intifada."

Ariel Sharon's role has also been cited by some commentators. Sharon, a Likud member serving as Minister of Industry in the grand coalition when the Inifada broke out, had an infamous reputations among Palestinians, including for his pacification campaign in the 1967–71 Gazan insurgency and his responsibility for the 1982 Sabra and Shatila massacre of Palestinian refugees in Beirut. In mid-December 1987, after the unrest had already begun, Sharon made a high-profile move into a flat in the Muslim Quarter of the Old City of Jerusalem, with the help of the Ateret Cohanim movement, which aims to create a Jewish demographic majority in the Old City of Jerusalem and in Palestinian East Jerusalem. The move sparked significant unrest in East Jerusalem, fuelling the spread of the Gazan unrest to every corner of the occupied territories.

=== Unpreparedness of the Israeli government and military for an uprising ===
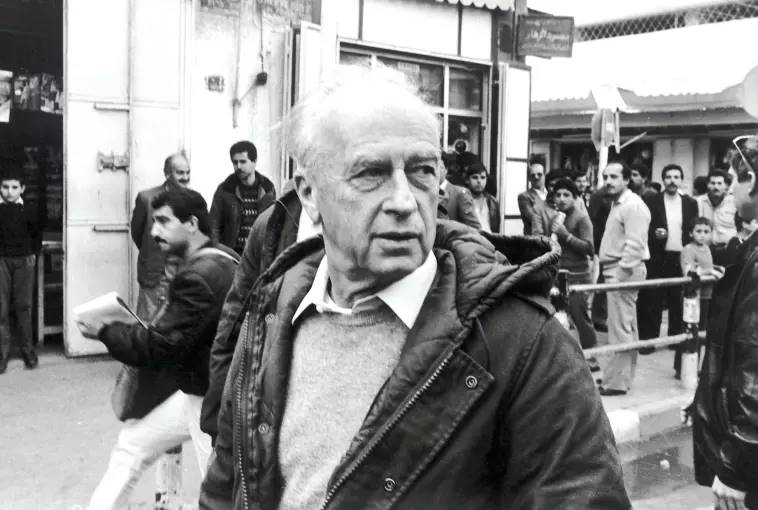
Israeli Minister of Defence Yitzhak Rabin visiting the Gaza Strip shortly after the outbreak of the First Intifada. Prior to the Intifada, Rabin led the Israeli government's "Iron Fist" policy. When the Intifada broke out, Rabin then at first underestimated the growing unrest and then enacted the "force, might, and beatings" policy. Later, as Prime Minister, he negotiated the Oslo Accords.

Many commentators have argued that the Israeli government and military were significantly unprepared for a Palestinian uprising. According to Rabbani, "the intelligence services failed to anticipate and prevent it. Then the military high command refused to recognize the scope and character of the mass demonstrations and thereby facilitated their transformation into a coherent popular rebellion. And in the ensuing months and years, the Israeli military, still recovering from defeat in Lebanon, consistently failed to quell the uprising or even regain its deterrent profile vis-a-vis the population of the West Bank and Gaza Strip." According to Ido Zelkovitz of the Max Stern Yezreel Valley College, "the fact that the Israeli government was not ready for this popular resistance gave Palestinians an early advantage and helped Palestinians create this alternative local leadership while challenging the old guard of the PLO and Fatah."

According to Sergio Catignani of the University of Sussex, the Israeli military and government interpreted the increase in Palestinian demonstrations and stone-throwing during the 1980s as "individual and sporadic endeavours" that were "not thought to seriously challenge the Israeli occupation." Shachar has argued that Israeli decision makers in the 1980s made "several conceptual mistakes concerning the Palestinians. The most fatal fallacy was that the Palestinians had tacitly accepted the status quo imposed by Israel, including the settlements all over Gaza, the total ban on political activity and the all-pervading presence of the Shabak security service," also noting that "the Israeli government never formulated any explicit long-term development plans for the territories." Emmanuel Sivan of the Hebrew University of Jerusalem has argued that "Israeli complacency and indifference to the situation in the territories, particularly in Gaza," contributed to the outbreak of the Intifada, pointing towards an ignored 1985 report by a committee led by General Avraham Tamir that warned that "the Gaza Strip is a demographic and economic — and therefore also a political and security — time bomb." According to Sivan, the report noted factors like high population growth, lack of skilled employment opportunities, an idea by the Israeli Civil Administration to establish a citrus juice factory that failed due to lobbying from the Israeli agricultural industry, and growing political collaboration between Palestinians in Gaza and the West Bank. Peretz has noted that, after the first few months of the Intifada, "hardly any Israeli newspaper or politician boasts any longer of benefits Israel has brought to the occupied territories, as they did just a few months ago... Most Israeli factions have recognized that continued occupation will require harsh, even brutal measures, and that if there ever was an enlightened occupation, its time has passed."

According to Inbar, "the guidelines for maintaining law and order, last formulated in 1976, emphasized minimizing contact with the population, along with a clear policy of 'carrots and sticks.' This meant primarily economic benefits for 'well-behaved' towns and villages and punishment for those creating problems... Law and order were to be maintained by Border Police units, while the IDF were assigned a backup role." Israeli Brigadier General Amatzia Chen has argued that "in 1987, only a few hundred soldiers were stationed in Gaza and the West Bank. With such scant numbers of forces, local Arabs took advantage of this weakness to engage in violence. The Palestinians gained confidence and they felt like they had the upper hand. The IDF ended up shooting at civilians on a daily basis just to survive." In a December 1987 editorial, The Press noted that "Israeli troops are trained to fight in a conventional war, but not to face a crowd armed with stones and petrol bombs. Stones and petrol bombs can be damaging weapons, but they are not guns, missiles, or tanks. Israeli soldiers have responded with bullets, and Palestinians have been killed." According to Mandel, "the few IDF troops regularly stationed in the Gaza Strip could not cope with either the scale or intensity of the disturbances... Moreover, despite periodic pronouncements proclaiming the IDF's procurement and/or development of nonlethal riot-control equipment, the Israeli troops were as unequipped as they were untrained to cope with demonstrations of this magnitude."

According to historian Colin Shindler, "initially, most military men including the Minister of Defence, Yitzhak Rabin, dismissed the Intifada as peripheral... The Israeli army believed that the insurrection would be crushed swiftly as in the past." According to Shachar, the Israeli government's failure in the first few weeks of the Intifada to "see the riots for what they were – a spontaneous and genuine popular revolt against the occupation – gave the Gazans several valuable weeks." On 11 December 1987, as the unrest was spreading across the Palestinian territories, Rabin left Israel for a ten-day trip to the United States to sign a defence procurement deal with the American government, and refused to cut short the trip as the unrest worsened; and on 13 December, during Rabin's trip, according to Mandel, "the cabinet resolved formally that no 'civil revolt' was under way in the territories, that the media were to blame for inflating what was actually a passing wave of riots, and that the security forces had things under firm control. No need was seen for a change of policy in the territories."

=== Increasing internal debates over the occupation within Israel ===
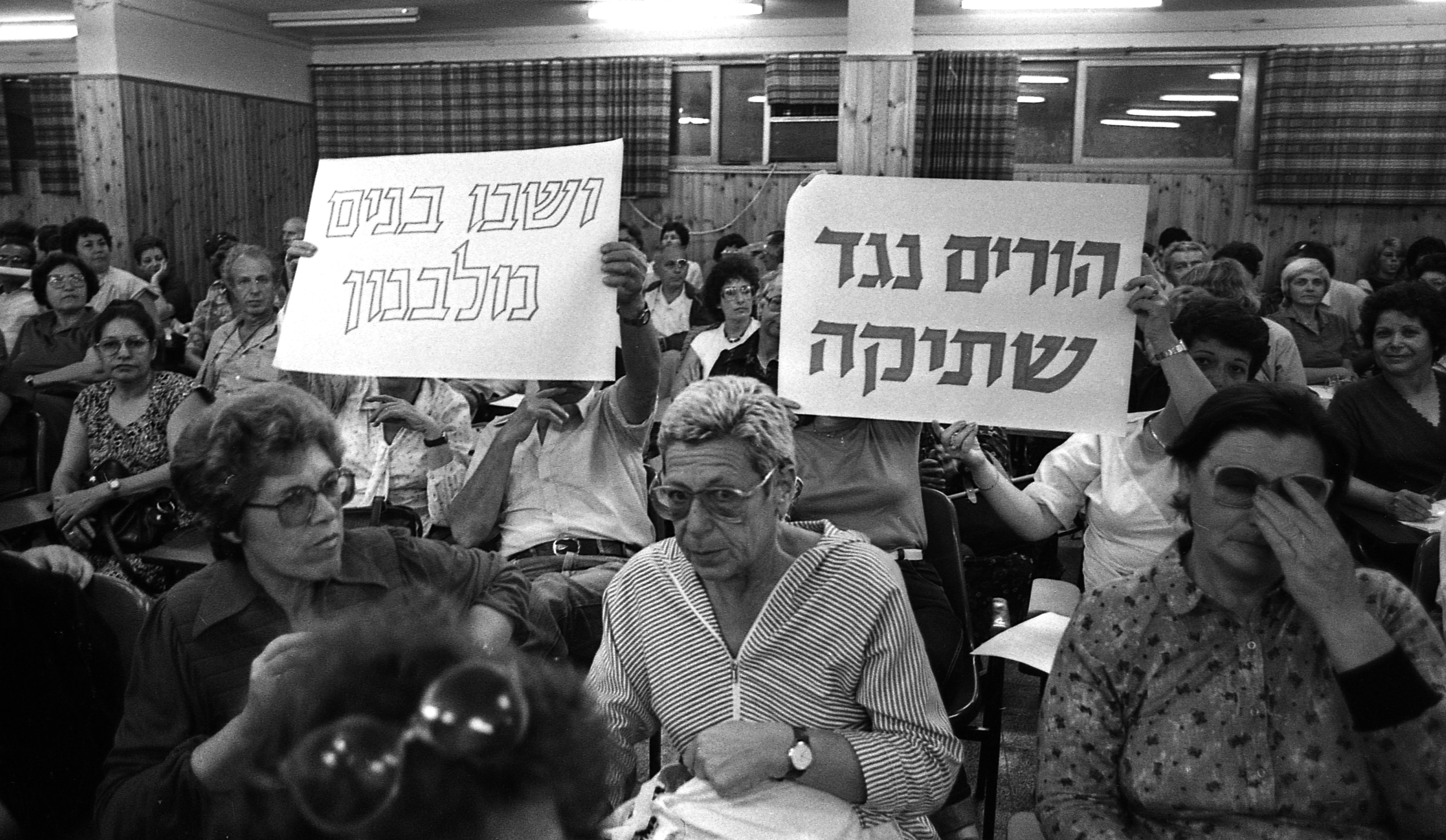
1983 protest in Israel calling for the withdrawal of the IDF from Lebanon. The occupation of southern Lebanon that began in 1982 caused significant internal debates within Israel.

By 1987, Israeli society was increasingly divided over the future of the occupation. According to Alimi, "the Israeli polity post-1967 ran into deep domestic conflict over the territories’ future status that gradually developed into a system-wide crisis, i.e. a sociopolitical division, which undermined the foundations of the regime's framework and the bases of its authority, and was manifested in the rise of political violence, distrust in the system and unprecedented violation of the rule of law," a domestic conflict that was "collectively perceived by the Palestinians as an opportunity to increase contention." According to Hillel Frisch of Bar-Ilan University, "ostensibly, Israel faced the first intifada unified under a unity government but the government was hardly unified... The situation went from bad to worse after the 1988 elections held in November 1988 at the height of the intifada in which the Right-wing Likud and Left-of-center Labor almost tied, with 40 seats to the Right-wing party and 39 to Labor, reflecting the split over the future of the territories in the Israeli public opinion." According to Israeli scholar Gad Barzilai, "Compared to the war of 1956, the structure of the party system during the Intifada could not prevent public opposition. Furthermore, the citizenry did not experience the same degree of fear of destruction as it did during the war of 1967. The Intifada was not only over the occupied territories but was also generated and managed within the territories. Thus, and more than ever, the controversies in Israel about the future of the Gaza Strip and especially the West Bank inflamed political dissent during the hostilities."

According to Grinberg, following the 1982 Israeli invasion of Lebanon, there was "growing criticism within Israel's civil as well as military society regarding the use of the IDF not for defensive purposes but for offensive and aggressive purposes, mainly aiming to maintain the occupation and expand the settlements in the OT." Shalev has argued that "internal dissent in Israel over policy in Lebanon and the government's seeming loss of its decisionmaking ability," as well as several high-profile security-related scandals during the 1980s (including the Bus 300 affair and the Izat Nafsu case), "undermined IDF deterrence and undercut the traditional status of the Israeli soldier." American researcher Sheila H. Katz has argued that "a new generation of nonviolent activists joined forces on an unprecented scale" across the Israeli-Palestinian border following the 1982 invasion, noting that "by 1986, the Likud Party was so incensed with the escalation of meetings between the PLO and Israelis that the Knesset passed a law outlawing contacts."

According to Palestinian-American scholar Edward Said, research on the Nakba by the Israeli New Historians caused the emergence of "a perceptible continuity between Zionist theories and actions before as well after 1967," claiming that this revealed an expansionist state philosophy instead of a defensive philosophy.

== Global politics ==
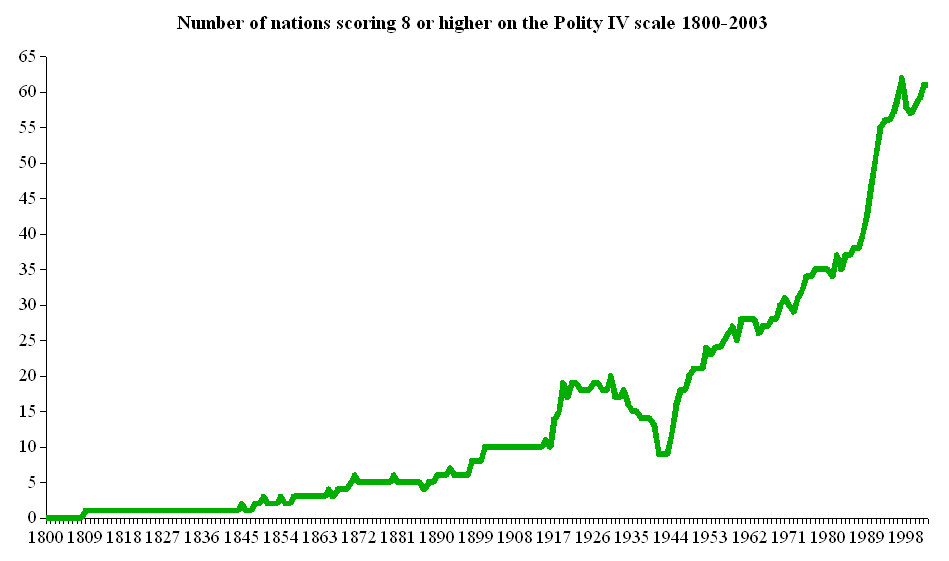
Number of nations deemed democracies according to the Polity data series, between 1800 and 2003. A number of countries saw increased democratisation during the 1980s and 1990s.

=== Global democratisation ===
Lustick places the First Intifada in the context of the third wave of democratisation, saying that it was "the first of many mass-based, illegal, nonviolent or semiviolent challenges to nondemocratic governing structures to burst upon the world scene at the end of the 1980s. Algeria and Jordan erupted in 1988. Mass mobilizations subsequently appeared in Burma, in the Baltic states, and in most East European countries in 1989, then in China, South Africa, Kenya, and in many of the constituent republics of the former Soviet Union." Pappé has argued that the PLO's failure to liberate Palestine was becoming "accentuated in the 1980s by the liberation of oppressed people in East Asia, Eastern Europe, and South Africa."

Joana Ricarte of the University of Coimbra has argued that international politics shifted during the 1970s and 1980s away from solving conflicts purely through the lens of deals between political elites and towards incorporating initiatives that dealt with deeper social and identity issues, leading towards a greater international recognition of Palestinian identity, towards greater dialogue between Israeli and Palestinian activists, and contributing to the "reach of the Intifada, part and consequence of this process of democratization of society."

=== Other global developments ===
According to Alin, international criticism of the 1982 Israeli invasion of Lebanon led to an assumption among Palestinians that "relative to the international environment of the 1970s and early 1980s, a Palestinian initiative against the Israeli occupation in the late 1980s would be more likely to prompt some form of positive, or at the least not openly hostile, international response."

Writing in The Jerusalem Post in December 1987, Israeli journalist Yehuda Litani argued that the Washington Summit between Reagan and Soviet leader Mikhail Gorbachev between 8 and 10 December 1987 played a role in the outbreak of the uprising, saying that Palestinians in the occupied territories wanted "to take this opportunity to remind the world that their problem have not gone away."

== Rising tensions through 1987 and inciting incidents ==
Although the First Intifada is widely agreed to have started in December 1987, some commentators have pointed to a number of incidents that occurred throughout 1987 as directly contributing to rising tensions between Israelis and Palestinians and, ultimately, contributing to the breakout of the Intifada. According to Hiltermann, "the greatest surprise, with hindsight, was that the uprising had not occurred before December 1987... from late 1986 on, there was definitely 'something in the air.'" According to Anita Vitullo, "one year before the Palestinian mass uprising began, the writing was on the walls." According to Rabbani and Hajjar, Palestinian unrest had become "frequent and particularly intense during late 1986 and the spring of 1987," as "university campuses and large towns became the focus of an escalating spiral of resistance" that lead into the breakout of the Intifada. Shalev has argued that "the period immediately preceding the uprising saw a number of flagrantly unusual incidents." Lesch has argued that "in the year before the intifada broke out, Gaza experienced a significant increase in both organizational activities and violent confrontations. Some of the tactics paralleled those used later in the intifada and indicated that for some Gazans the 'barrier of fear' was already broken."

=== Incidents of unrest ===
One of these incidents was the December 1986 Birzeit University protests, a significant wave of protests across the occupied Palestinian territories sparked by the deaths of two Birzeit University students while protesting against an Israeli military roadblock established on the road to the campus.

1987 would be marked by additional significant waves of Palestinian unrest. Vitullo has cited the February 1987 Palestinian unrest, sparked by Israeli attempts to disperse Palestinians protests over the War of the Camps in Syria, and the Spring 1987 West Bank unrest, marked by the largest Palestinian prisoners' hunger strike since the early 1980s, the murder of two Israeli settlers followed by settler riots, the death of a Birzeit University student, and intesnified Israeli crackdowns on Palestinians. Shalev has additionally cited a "mini-intifada" in the Balata Camp in May 1987, which saw Fatah's youth (known as the Shabiba) and women's movements in the camp effectively force the IDF to retreat, as well as a wave of unrest that broke out in Gaza in autumn 1987 after the arrest and deportation of Abdul Aziz Awda, the founder of the PIJ. Lesch has cited the increased coordination between Palestinian groups during the protests over the War of the Camps, during the protests throughout 1987 over Israeli efforts to suppress the Shabiba, and during the Autumn unrest in Gaza.

Also occurring in Gaza in November 1987 was the death of Intisar al-Attara, a 16-year-old girl from Deir al-Balah who was murdered by settlers. Jamal Zakout, who acted as a member of the UNLU during the Intifada, has argued that the death of al-Attara played a direct role in sparking the Initfada, saying that "this injustice was accompanied by conscious attempts to humiliate people. I remember the Jafaati and Golani military units, which would be deployed for a rest in Gaza after combat missions in Lebanon. These units would take pleasure in tormenting people in Gaza in an unbelievable manner. They would tip over stalls in the market. They would force elderly people to clean spray-painted slogans, or even order them to dance on their stalls. They deliberately humiliated people, and even threatened their lives. People felt no one was safe, and that everyone was a target."

=== Terrorist incidents ===
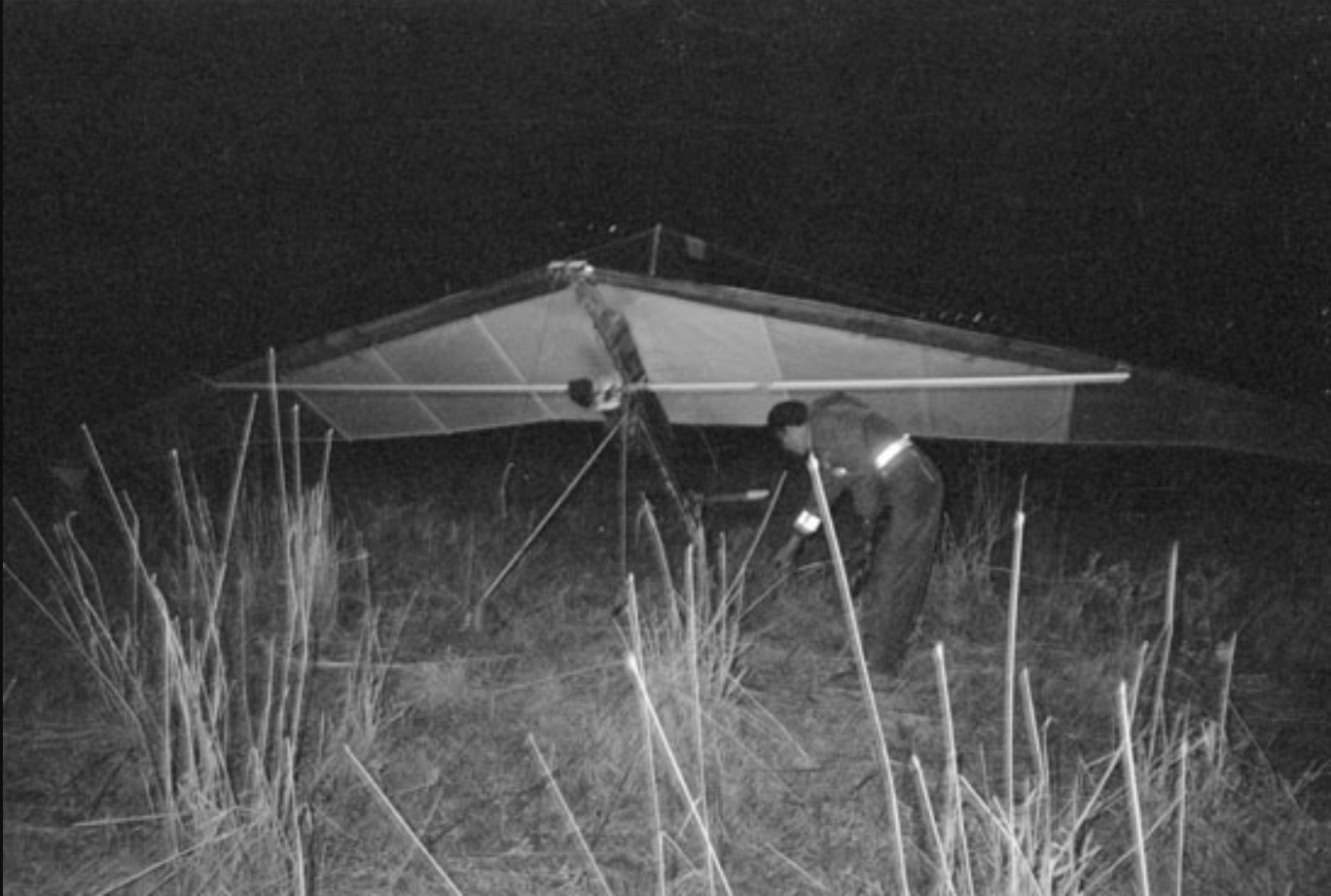
An Israeli soldier inspects one of the hang gliders used by the PLFP-GC to perpetrate the Night of the Gliders attack in November 1987. The attack was the deadliest Palestinian attack inside Israel in almost a decade.

As well as waves of unrest, several terrorist incidents occurred during 1987. One of these was the 1987 Gaza prison escape in May 1987, during which six Palestinian Islamic Jihad members escaped from Israeli custody. The prison escape was followed by mutiplie incidents involving the six escapees, notably the August 1987 Murder of Ron Tal, the commander of the Israeli military police in the Gaza Strip, after which an unprecedentedely strict curfew was placed on the Gaza Strip, which notably saw Muslim Gazans confined to their homes during Eid al-Adha, increasing discontent among Gazans. Another notable incident involving the escapees was a shootout between the escapees and the IDF in October 1987. Members of the Palestinian Islamic Jihad have since frequently claimed that the Intifada actually began with the October shootout instead of the widely agreed upon December date.

The November 1987 Night of the Gliders surprise attack by the Popular Front for the Liberation of Palestine – General Command on an Israeli military base has also been cited as contributing to the outbreak of the Intifada. The attack, during which two PFLP-GC militants killed six Israeli soldiers and wounded eight more, the deadliest Palestinian attack inside Israel in nearly a decade.

Abu-Amr has argued that the PIJ incidents and the Night of Gliders "intensified already highly charged nationalist sentiments" and "demonstrated that Israel - even with its strong army, advanced weaponry, and elaborate security measures - was not invincible." According to Israeli general Yitzhak Mordechai, head of the Southern Command when the First Intifada broke out, the effect of the incidents was that "morale among Palestinians rose significantly, as did their readiness to stand up to army soldiers."

=== 8 December 1987 Erez Crossing accident ===
The specific incident that is most widely agreed to have sparked the First Intifada is an accident at the Erez Crossing on 8 December 1987. That day, a truck driven by an Israeli accidentally crashed into a row of Palestinian cars, killing four Palestinian workers. In the aftermath of the accident, rumours spread throughout the Gaza Strip that it had been a deliberate attack, arranged in retaliation for the death of Israeli salesman Shlomo Sakal, who had been stabbed in Gaza several days earlier. The funeral for the four dead Palestinian workers was attended by thousands of Gazans, and developed into mass demonstrations. As the heated demonstration continued the next day, the Israeli military shot and killed Hatem Abu Sisi, a 17-year-old Gazan protestor, inflaming the protests in Gaza and sparking protests throughout the West Bank and East Jerusalem. By 12 December, 6 Palestinian protestors had been shot and killed by the Israeli military, further inflaming the protests, which prompted a harsher Israeli crackdown, which in turn flamed a cycle of further protests and further crackdowns. This cycle became increasingly organised and coordinated into an uprising, with the Unified National Leadership of the Uprising (formed of the PCP, the PFLP, the DFLP, and Fatah, and based on decentralised popular committees) being formed in early January 1988.

== See also ==
- Sumud
- Causes of the Second Intifada
