= Killing of Ron Tal =

On 2 August 1987, Israeli Lieutenant Ron Tal was shot and killed by Palestinian militants in the Gaza Strip.

== Events ==
On Sunday 2 August 1987, a Palestinian man in Gaza City approached an Israeli military vehicle on Wehda Street and opened fire, before fleeing the scene. The attack killed Lieutenant Ron Tal, a 22-year-old officer originally from the Tzahala neighbourhood of Tel Aviv, who had been serving as the head of the Israeli military police in the Gaza Strip since spring 1987. Tal was the first fatality resulting from Palestinian militant attacks in the Gaza Strip in several months, since May 1987, and the attack was widely considered unusual, as Israeli soldiers in Gaza usually faced stone-throwing but not shooting.

Responsibility for the shooting was claimed by Force 17, a Fatah special operations unit, in the days following the attack. However, commentators since have largely attributed responsibility to the Palestinian Islamic Jihad (PIJ), specifically on the six PIJ members who escaped from an Israeli prison in Gaza in May 1987. Ann M. Lesch of Villanova University wrote in 1990 that the murder was meant as revenge against Tal's role overseeing the Ansar II prison, a prison considered infamous by many Palestinians. In 2018, Israeli general Yitzhak Mordechai, who served as head of the Israeli Southern Command when the attack took place, placed responsibility on the PIJ, and credited Moshe Ya'alon and his Sayeret Matkal for locating and killing the perpetrators.

In response to the shooting, the Israeli military imposed an indefinite curfew on Gaza City, confining all Palestinians residents to their homes and banning Palestinians from entering or leaving the Gaza Strip. The imposition of a curfew was an unusually harsh measure, one of the harshest the Israeli military had imposed in the Gaza Strip since the start of the Israeli occupation in 1967. Several hundred Gazans were arrested by the Israeli military, and the military conducted widespread searches of Gazan homes.

The curfew sparked widespread discontent among Gazans, with some describing it as collective punishment. Discontent was amplified by the fact that the curfew coincided with and disrupted Eid al-Adha, one of the most important days of celebrations for Muslims. On 3 August, with the curfew on Palestinians in Gaza still in effect, far-right Israeli MK Meir Kahane organised a demonstration in Gaza City in protest over the murder and calling for all Palestinians in the Gaza Strip to be deported.

The curfew was partially lifted on 4 August, with Palestinian fishers allowed to return to work. That day, Israeli Chief of the General Staff Dan Shomron visited Gaza City. According to the Jewish Telegraphic Agency, during his visit, Shomron "stressed that the Israel Defense Force did not intend to harm the Gaza Strip residents. But, he added, the residents must realize that the ongoing search for Tal’s killer may make life hard for them. Intensive security searches have been going on since Sunday but Tal’s car has not yet been found. Security sources were bitter Monday because no one had volunteered any information that could lead to the apprehension of the killer. The sources noted that the attack took place in an area in the center of town where local residents, shopkeepers and passers-by must have seen what was happening."

Stores were fully allowed to re-open on 9 August.

== Reactions ==
Israeli Minister of Defence Yitzhak Rabin described the attack as "an exception... The incident was not in the category of ‘disturbance.’ It was a terrorist act planned by an individual or squad," saying that it "demands a broad action" from the Israeli authorities, but denied that the imposition of a curfew was collective punishment, saying that it was instead "taking steps which, in addition to all the other steps, will allow us to reach the perpetrators of the murder. Of course, in addition, it is intended to make it clear to all residents of Gaza and the local leaders that we will not tolerate such murderous activity." Israeli Southern Command head Yitzhak Mordechai stated the military would "take all necessary steps to prevent another incident like this and capture the murderer or murderers as soon as possible."

Former Mayor of Gaza City Rashad al-Shawwa denounced the attack, but warned that the atmosphere in the Gaza Strip was increasingly "unstable." Mary Curtius of The Christian Science Monitor quoted one Gazan merchant as saying: "What happened here is that one person died and the whole country goes berserk. They shoot us sometimes like animals and nobody gives a damn. None of us is in favor of killing. But the Israelis must understand that this is occupation, and that under occupation you have different rules. Do they expect us just to lie down?"

== Aftermath ==
Tal was buried in the Kiryat Shaul Cemetery, and granted a posthumous promotion to the rank of captain. Following the attack, the Israeli military issued an order forbidding its soldiers from travelling through the Gaza Strip by themselves, requiring that they move in groups of at least two, also requiring that soldiers moving through Gaza be fully armed.

The murder and subsequent curfew have been cited by some researchers and commentators as a possible instigating factor of the First Intifada, which broke out in the Gaza Strip in December 1987. According to Ann M. Lesch of Villanova University, by the autumn of 1987, Israeli soldiers in the Gaza Strip "were decidedly skittish," while throughout 1987, "the Strip had seethed with unrest."
