= Ahsan I. Butt =

Pakistani academic

Ahsan I. Butt is a Pakistani political scientist. He is an associate professor at the Schar School of Policy and Government at George Mason University. He has published research on ethnicity and nationalism, security, international order, and South Asia. He is a frequent commentator on Pakistani politics.

== Career ==
Butt's book, Secession and Security: Explaining State Strategy Against Separatists, was named 2019 book of the year by the International Securities Studies Section at the International Studies Association. The book has been reviewed in multiple publications.

Butt has a PhD in political science from the University of Chicago.

== Bibliography ==
- Secession and Security: Explaining State Strategy against Separatists (2017)
