= Alain Gresh =

French journalist and former editor of (born 1948)

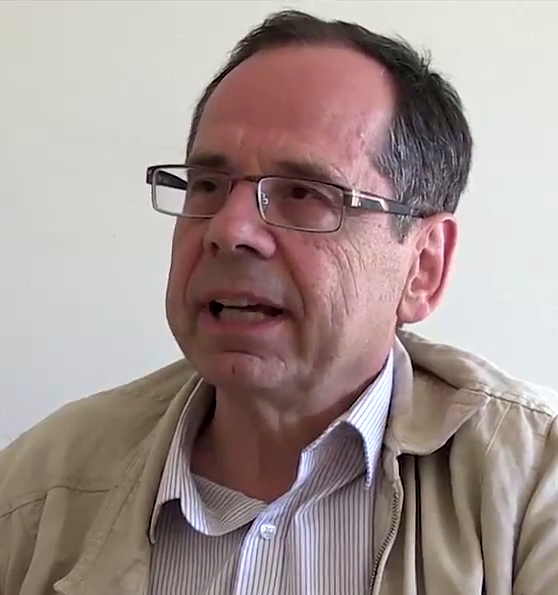
Alain Gresh in 2014

Alain Gresh (born 1948 in Cairo, Egypt) is a French communist party leader and journalist.

He is the former editor of Le Monde Diplomatique. He writes articles mainly on the Islamic world and the Arab world. Alongside his career, he is a Palestinian nationalist activist.

== Biography ==
Alain Gresh was raised in Cairo, Egypt. His biological father was Henri Curiel, a Jewish-Egyptian communist activist who was forced to leave for France in 1950. Gresh knew Curiel as a family friend and only learned in his late twenties that he was his son. At the age of 14, Gresh moved to Paris to study mathematics and Arabic. As soon as he arrived in France, he joined the French Communist Party youth.

After graduating from high school, he became the leader of the French communist youth. In 1978, he became secretary general of the World Festival of Youth and Students in Havana.

He was later named in charge of the French Communist Party foreign policy department. He continued studying the Near East in college, and wrote his PhD dissertation on the Palestine Liberation Organization (PLO). In 2007, he admitted he had regular meeting with leaders of the Soviet Union. Gresh claims he created the first pro-Palestinian Organization in France after Moscow decided to change its foreign policy.

He was editor of Le Monde diplomatique, and retired at end of 2015. He then cofounded the website Orient XXI.

== Selected articles ==
- "Shadow of the army over Egypt's revolution", Le Monde Diplomatique (August 2013)
- "The Middle East: How the Peace was Lost", Le Monde Diplomatique (September 2001)

== Books ==
In English:

- The PLO: The Struggle Within: Towards an Independent Palestinian State (1988).
- The Middle East: War Without End? (1988). With Dominique Vidal.
- An A to Z of the Middle East (1990). With Dominique Vidal.
- Ordinary Days in Dheisheh: Is the World Watching? (2000). With Munā Hamzeh.
- The New AZ of the Middle East (2004). With Dominique Vidal.
- Israel, Palestine: Truths of a Conflict (2007).

In French:

- Palestine 47, un partage avorté (1994).
- Les 100 portes du Proche-Orient, Éditions de l'Atelier (1996/2006). With Dominique Vidal.
- L'islam en questions (2000). With Tariq Ramadan.
- Palestine: Vérités sur un conflit (2001/2010).
- L'Islam, la République et le Monde (2004).
- 1905-2005: les enjeux de la laïcité (2005).
- De quoi la Palestine est-elle le nom? (2010).
- Un chant d’amour. Israël-Palestine, une histoire française, with Hélène Aldeguer, éditions La Découverte, (2017)

== See also ==
- Dominique Vidal
