= Elie Rekhess =

Israeli scholar of political history

Elie Rekhess (Hebrew: אלי רכס; born in Haifa) is an Israeli scholar of political history of the Arabs in Israel; Islamic resurgence in Israel; the West Bank and Gaza and Palestinian affairs. He serves as Crown Visiting professor in Israel Studies at Northwestern University in Illinois, affiliated with the Department of History and the Department of Jewish Studies. He was formerly on the faculty of the Department of Middle Eastern History at Tel Aviv University and served as head of the Konrad Adenauer Program for Jewish-Arab Cooperation.

As an expert on Arab society in Israel, Rekhess' knowledge covers the fields of Political Islam, Palestinian society and politics, the political history of the Arab minority in Israel, minorities and ethnicity in the Middle East, Israeli politics, and social and ethnic cleavages in Israel. He is also a former officer of the Israeli Defense Forces (IDF), actively engaged in the combat sector in his earlier years. As an IDF officer he has real-life experience dealing with combating the various Palestinian resistance movements.

== Education ==
Rekhess graduated in 1970 from the Hebrew University of Jerusalem with a B.A. in History of Islamic Countries; Classical Arabic Language and Literature. Six years later, Dr. Rekhess received his M.A. at The Aranne School of History at Tel Aviv University specializing in "Affinity to Islam within the Samaria (West Bank) Intelligentsia" cum laude. His Ph.D., obtained in 1986 also at the Aranne School of History at Tel Aviv University, was titled "Between Communism and Arab Nationalism: Rakah and the Arab Minority in Israel (1965-1973)."

== Academic experience ==
=== Research positions ===
Since 2008, Rekhess has served as associate director of Israel Studies at Northwestern University, where he helped establish Israel Studies as part of the Crown Family Center for Jewish and Israel Studies.

Since 1982, Rekhess has held various posts at the Moshe Dayan Center for Middle Eastern and African Studies. From 1982 to 1986 he served as a researcher, and from 1987 to 2010 Rekhess served as a senior research fellow. From 1996 to 2003, Rekhess was the director of the Program on Arab Politics in Israel (Sponsored by the Konrad Adenauer Foundation). From 2004 to 2010 Rekhess was the director of the Konrad Adenauer Program for Jewish-Arab Cooperation in Israel at the Moshe Dayan Center. At Northwestern University, Rekhess was a co-chair of the Middle East Forum, a platform for dialogue, interdisciplinary research, and to promote the intellectual collaboration demanded by the complex issues of the region.

=== Teaching positions ===
Rekhess has held various teaching positions both in Israel and America. He currently teaches as Crown visiting professor in Israel Studies within the Jewish Studies Program at Northwestern University in Evanston. From 2002 to the present, Rekhess has been a visiting professor at Northwestern University in the Department of Jewish Studies and History. From 1987 to the present, Rekhess has been a member of the Department of Middle Eastern and African History at Tel Aviv University. Also from 1987 to the present, Rekhess has been on the faculty of the School for Overseas Students at Tel Aviv University. From 1990 to the present Rekhess has been a faculty member of the Wexner Heritage Foundation.

Since 2004, Rekhess has taught at the Tauber Institute for the Study of European Jewry in the Summer Institute for Israel Studies through Brandeis University. From 2002 to 2003, Rekhess taught at Spertus College in Chicago, IL. From 1990 to 1996, Rekhess taught in the Journalism Studies Program at Tel Aviv University. From 1990 to 1998, Rekhess was a faculty member in the Center for Jewish Studies at Lehigh University in Bethlehem, PA and Lafayette College in Easter, PA.

=== Administrative positions ===
Rekhess currently serves as associate director for Israel Studies within the Crown Family Center for Jewish and Israel Studies. From 1977 to 1981, Rekhess acted as director of the Shiloah Center for Middle Eastern and African Studies. From 1972 to 1973, Rekhess was the Acting Associate Director of the Shiloah Center for Middle Eastern and African Studies.

=== Advisory posts ===
Dr. Rekhess has held a variety of significant advisory posts, including senior consultant on Arab Minority Affairs to the Prime Minister's Office (1993–1994); senior consultant on Arab Affairs to the Histadrut Labor Organization (1994); senior consultant to the Abraham Fund for the Enhancement of Jewish-Arab Coexistence (1994 to 2008); and member of the board of 'Sikkuy', the Association for the Advancement of Equal Opportunities (1993 to 2007). A regular public lecturer and television commentator on Arab issues in Israel and the territories, he served as a strategic advisor to Ehud Barak during his election campaign (1999) and as an advisor to Science Minister Matan Vilna'i, chairman of the Ministerial Committee on the Arabs in Israel (1999–2000).

== Academic and professional awards ==
From 2004 to the present, Rekhess receives a $100,000 annual grant by the Konrad Adenauer Foundation to establish the Konrad Adenauer Program for Jewish-Arab Cooperation. From 1995 to 2003, Rekhess received a $50,000 annual grant by the Konrad Adenauer Foundation to run the "Research Program on Arab Politics in Israel." In 1993, Rekhess received a 30,000 grant for a conference on "Arab Politics in Israel at a Crossroad," by the Konrad Adenauer Foundation.

== Personal life ==
In 1980, Elie Rekhess married Ankie Spitzer, widow of Andre Spitzer, who died in the Munich massacre in 1972. They are now divorced. His current spouse is Leora Gal Rekhess.

== Selected bibliography ==
- E. Rekhess with A. Rudnitzky (eds.), Arab Youth in Israel: Caught between Prospects and Risk. Tel Aviv University, the Dayan Center (2008) 124 pp. (Hebrew)
- E. Rekhess (ed.), Together but Apart: Mixed Cities in Israel. Tel-Aviv University: The Dayan Center, 2007, 184 pp. (Hebrew)
- E. Rekhess (ed.), The Arab Minority in Israel and the 17th Knesset Elections. Tel-Aviv University: The Dayan Center, 112pp., 2007 (Hebrew)
- E. Rekhess, S. Ozacky-Lazar (eds.), The Status of the Arab Minority in the Jewish Nation State. Tel-Aviv University: The Dayan Center, 112pp., 2005 (Hebrew)
- E. Rekhess, S. Ozacky-Lazar (eds.), The Municipal Elections in the Arab and Druze Sector (2003): Clans, Sectarianism and Political Parties. Tel-Aviv University: The Dayan Center, 79pp., 2005 (Hebrew)
- E. Rekhess (ed.), Arab Politics in Israel at a Crossroad, Moshe Dayan Center, 102 pp., 1996. (Hebrew & English)
- E. Rekhess, The Arab Minority in Israel: Between Communism and Arab Nationalism, 1965–1991. Ha-Kibutz He-Meuhad, Israel, 271 pp., 1993. (Hebrew)
