= Izat Nafsu =

Israel Defense Forces lieutenant

Izat Nafsu (Hebrew: עיזת נפשו) was an Israel Defense Forces lieutenant who was falsely convicted in 1980 of passing information and weapons to Palestinians in Lebanon. He spent seven years in prison until his case was overturned.

== Case ==
Nafsu is an Israeli Circassian from Kfar Kama in northern Israel. By the end of the 1970s, he had become a lieutenant in the Israel Defense Forces, working as a liaison officer with the Phalangists, a right-wing Christian militia allied to Israel in the Israeli–Lebanese conflict, in southern Lebanon.

In late 1979, he left the IDF and returned to his home village, where he got married. In January 1980, he was told by an officer to return to his IDF unit at six in the morning. En route, the officer handed him to Shin Bet agents, who arrested Nafsu and held him in the Kishon Detention Center. He was subsequently accused by Shin Bet of having passed military intelligence to Palestinians and Syria.

His interrogator was Yossi Ginossar, who had also been involved in the Bus 300 affair in 1984. In a 2023 interview with Haaretz, he stated that Shin Bet "wear you down completely. Including various types of threats. In the end they break you mentally" during interrogations, saying that they used techniques including forced nudity, being kicked, being stepped on, having his hair pulled, sleep deprivation, and freezing showers.

His trial took place in 1981 in front of a secret military tribunal, with charges of treason and espionage. He was found guilty, being sentenced to 18 years incarceration and being stripped of his IDF rank.

In 1986, the Knesset passed a law allowing IDF soldiers to appeal military tribunal rulings to the Supreme Court of Israel. Following the change in legislation, Nafsu appealed his sentence. In May 1987, the Supreme Court ruled that Nafsu had been framed by Shin Bet, who had fabricated evidence against him, and that he had been forced into giving a false confession. The Supreme Court further ruled that Nafsu was innocent of all charges against him except for a minor charge of holding an unauthorised meeting with a Palestine Liberation Organization official in Lebanon, for which the sentence was two years of time already served. He was subsequently released, having spent a total of seven and a half years in prison.

Following his release, Nafsu sued the Israeli government, seeking damages compensation. Yosef Harish, Attorney General of Israel, also ordered an investigation into Shin Bet's treatment of Nafsu.

== Reactions ==
President of Israel Chaim Herzog called for the Israeli government to "take thorough steps to eradicate wrongful methods of interrogation and to insure proper supervision" of intelligence work. MK Yossi Sarid of the Labour Alignment stated that "We should be overjoyed at having such a court, but woe to us that we have such a Shin Beth." The left-wing Al HaMishmar newspaper compared the case to the 1894 Dreyfus affair in France.

Israeli Prime Minister Yitzhak Shamir warned against excessive criticism of Shin Bet, saying it was "waging a ceaseless war against terror and have performed great unpublished acts to ensure Israel's security." The centrist Maariv newspaper argued that when Shin Bet was "ordered to expose at all costs, prevent at all costs, capture the murderers immediately, there is also a price for this demand." In an anonymous article published in Yedioth Ahronoth, a former head of Shin Bet's investigations unit stated that Nafsu was "speaking the truth about how we treated him in the investigation," but argued that the agency's conduct was justified, saying that "The investigation was conducted quickly, like any investigation dealing with terrorism. We lied out of necessity," and that the findings against the agency would lead to an increase in terrorism.

Human rights activist Jonathan Kuttab of the Palestinian NGO Law in the Service of Man stated that "the issue of the methods of interrogation have been of concern to us for sometime." Journalist Nahum Barnea stated that there were "thousands of people" who were interrogated by Shin Bet every year who were undoubtedly badly treated and that Nafsu's case was "the tip of an iceberg, and what everybody is talking about now is not really Nafsu, but the whole policy of the ‘Shabak’ toward Palestinian suspects."

== Aftermath ==
Following Nafsu's case and the Bus 300 affair, the Israeli government established the Landau Commission to investiage Shin Bet's interrogation techniques. The Commission found that Shin Bet routinely used psychological and physical force during the interrogation of prisoners and then committed perjury at subsequent trials. Despite the Commission's findings, controversies over the use of torture in Israel have continued, with The Times of Israel reporting in 2012 that the Attorney General of Israel had received over 750 complaints since 2001 without opening a single investigation.

Nafsu's wife divorced him after he was sentenced. Following his release, he found work in a factory in Sha'ar HaGolan and remarried. He has claimed that his case had a significant impact on IDF recruitment in his hometown of Kfar Kama, saying that "When I was young, everyone in Kafr Kama enlisted in the army. After I was imprisoned, only about half of the boys here decided to enlist in the IDF. People here would say to me, ‘You joined the army and served in Lebanon, and in the end they threw you in jail. Why should we enlist?’"
