= Timeline of the First Intifada =

The First Intifada was a popular uprising by Palestinians against the Israeli occupation between late 1987 and 1993. A number of major events occurred related to the Intifada between those years.

== Overview ==
On 9 December 1987, an Israeli truck driver collided with and killed four Palestinians in the Jabalia refugee camp. The incident sparked the largest wave of Palestinian unrest since the Israeli occupation began in 1967: the First Intifada. During its early stages, the Intifada was largely characterised by a non-violent campaign, with actions including labour strikes, tax strikes, boycotts of Israeli goods, boycotts of Israeli institutions, demonstrations, the establishment of underground classrooms and cooperatives, raisings of the banned Palestinian flag, and civil disobedience. The actions were led by the Unified National Leadership of the Uprising (UNLU) and its popular committees, representing a decentralised and clandestine coalition of grassroots organisations, including labour unions, student councils, and women's committees. Although it claimed allegiance to the Palestinian Liberation Organisation and many of the grassroots organisations were affiliated with PLO factions (especially the Palestinian Communist Party, the DFLP, the PFLP, and Fatah), the UNLU operated outside of the direct control of the PLO leadership, who were mostly in exile in Tunisia or imprisoned (or had been killed by Israeli forces over the preceding years).

The Israeli government responded to the outbreak of the Intifada with a harsh crackdown, however, with Minister of Defence Yitzhak Rabin pledging to suppress it using "force, might, and beatings", including ordering Israeli soldiers to break the bones of Palestinian protestors, imposing widespread lockdowns on Palestinian cities, closing all schools and universities, mass arrests, and demolitions of Palestinian houses. By 1990, as the Israeli crackdown severely damaged the Palestinian economy, institutions, and morale, as the extremist conservative Islamist Hamas emerged, as the PLO leadership in exile attempted to take on greater day-to-day control over the Intifada, and as many of the initial UNLU organisers had been arrested, the UNLU lost its ability to direct the course of the uprising. The uprising subsequently grew more and more disorganised and violent, including Palestinian internal political violence against rumoured collaborators and attacks against Israelis. By the end of the Intifada, over a thousand Palestinians had been killed and over a hundred thousand injured by Israeli forces, with around two hundred Israelis having been killed by Palestinians and around 350 Palestinians killed by other Palestinians.

The First Intifada would come to an end between 1991 and 1993, with a series of intensive peace negotiations starting with the Madrid Conference of 1991. These negotiations marked the first time that the Israeli government agreed to negotiate directly with Palestinian leaders. The negotiations culminated in the 1993 Oslo Accords.

== Phases ==
=== Prelude ===
A number of commentators have argued that the Israeli–Palestinian conflict saw a period of significantly heightened tensions beginning in late-1986 that directly fed into the outbreak of the Intifada. According to Joost Hiltermann of the International Crisis Group, "the greatest surprise, with hindsight, was that the uprising had not occurred before December 1987 ... from late 1986 on, there was definitely 'something in the air.'" According to Anita Vitullo, "one year before the Palestinian mass uprising began, the writing was on the walls." According to Mouin Rabbani of the Institute for Palestine Studies and Lisa Hajjar of the University of California, Santa Barbara, Palestinian unrest had become "frequent and particularly intense during late 1986 and the spring of 1987," as "university campuses and large towns became the focus of an escalating spiral of resistance" that lead into the breakout of the Intifada. Aryeh Shalev of the Jaffee Center for Strategic Studies, a former Brigadier General in the IDF, has argued that "the period immediately preceding the uprising saw a number of flagrantly unusual incidents." Ann M. Lesch of Villanova University has argued that "in the year before the intifada broke out, Gaza experienced a significant increase in both organizational activities and violent confrontations. Some of the tactics paralleled those used later in the intifada and indicated that for some Gazans the 'barrier of fear' was already broken."

=== Debates over the start and end dates of the Intifada ===
The First Intifada is widely agreed to have started spontaneously and without any specific leadership in late 1987, catching both the Israeli government and the PLO by surprise. The large majority of commentators further agree that the start of the Intifada can be placed on 9 December 1987, the day of the truck accident in the Gaza Strip. Some commentators, however, have argued that the start date of the Intifada can be placed earlier, based on a number of high-profile incidents in the months immediately preceding December 1987. Members of the Palestinian Islamic Jihad frequently claim that the Initifada began on 6 October 1987, the day of a shootout between the IDF and several PIJ militants who had escaped from an Israeli prison in May.

There also exists some debate over the end date of the Intifada. Some commentators have placed the end date as the convening of the Madrid Conference of 1991, in late-October and early-November 1991. Other commentators have placed the end date as the signing of the Oslo I Accord in September 1993.

=== Phases of Palestinian tactics ===
Several commentators have argued that the First Intifada can be charactised in distinct phases, including an earlier phase where the Unified National Leadership of the Uprising (UNLU) was able to effectively direct a primarily non-violent campaign of civil disobedience that was widely seen as legitimate among Palestinians, and a latter phase in which the UNLU's leadership and the cohesion of the uprising disintegrated, accompanied by a significant increase in acts of violence. Israeli historian Avraham Sela has written that "longer [the Intifada] lasted, the more it shifted from civil rebellion demonstrations, work strikes and a boycott of Israeli products to increasingly uncontrolled violence against both Israel and internal 'traitors.'" Israeli historian Uri Milstein has argued that the Intifada can be divided into two stages: a first marked by mass participation in demonstration and stone-throwing and a second marked by a Hamas terrorist campaign.

According to Aden Tedla of the Global Nonviolent Action Database, "as increasing numbers of leaders were placed in jail during the summer of 1988, the discipline needed to maintain the nonviolent campaign became increasingly hard to find. ... After the summer of 1988, the old leadership of the PLO took command of the uprising and the latter years of the Palestinian intifada were characterized by armed struggle, which did not succeed in bringing about the end of the Israeli military occupation of the Palestinian territories."

Writing in mid-1990, Palestinian researcher Salim Tamari identified four stages of the Intifada: a first stage in December 1987 marked by spontaneous civil insurrection, a second stage from January to March 1988 marked by the coalescing of the uprising around the leadership of the UNLU and the popular committees, a third stage from February to June 1988 marked by Palestinian boycotts aimed at dismantling the Israeli Civil Administration, a fourth stage culminating in the Palestinian Declaration of Independence in November 1988, a fifth stage marked by a renewed Israeli counter-offensive against the uprising in the first half of 1989, and a sixth stage from the second half of 1989 marked by a more violent Palestinian "anti-collaboration campaign". According to Audrey Kurth Cronin of Carnegie Mellon University, "by 1990, the Intifada had lost direction and Palestinian groups were mainly fighting among themselves: in 1991, the Israelis killed fewer Palestinians (about 100) than did the Palestinians themselves (about 150)."

Ruth Margolies Beitler of the United States Military Academy has argued that the tactics used by Palestinians had shifted significantly by 1990, saying that "effective Israeli countermeasures and the fatigue of the rioters decrease the frequency and number of participants of large demonstrations, but led the dissidents to choose more violent methods over time. This change – the reduction of mass demonstrations – should not be perceived as a victory for the Israelis. On the contrary, it represented a radicalisation on the part of certain participants and an increase in the intensity of violence." Mary King of the University for Peace has argued that the uprising "would remain relatively coherent until March 1990, despite harsh reprisals... The movement would by its third year disintegrate into violence after Israel's incarceration, deportation, or discrediting of the very activist intellectuals who had sustained the uprising's nonviolent character and had throughout the 1970s and 1980s worked to bring about the new political thinking that produced the intifada."

=== Phases of the Israeli response ===
Ruth Margolies Beitler of the United States Military Academy has described the Israeli responses to the Intifada in phases, including a first phase in which the Israeli military failed to recognise that the uprising was significantly different to previous waves of Palestinian unrest and resorted to its usual methods of restoring calm (including crowd dispersal, curfews, and mass arrests), followed by a second phase, beginning in mid-January 1988, in which the military attempted to restore its deterrence profile (including with the force, might, and beatings policy). Ralph Mandel of the American Jewish Year Book proposed a first phase of the Intifada in 1988 from its outbreak through to March 1988, characterised by "sheer force of numbers and the unleashing of pent-up fury" on the part of Palestinians and Yitzhak Rabin's "force, might, and beatings" policy on the part of Israelis, with a second phase emerging in mid-March 1988, characterised by the UNLU's attempts to set-up an "alternative government" and the Israeli authorities's attempts to suppress alternative governance.

Efraim Inbar of Bar-Ilan University categorised the Israeli government's response to the Intifada in four chronological stages. In the first stage, during the first month of the uprising, the Israeli government was caught off guard and attempted to use the same measures it had previously used to suppress waves of Palestinian unrest. In the second stage, during the first months of 1988, the Israeli government saw the uprising as presenting a serious threat that it would be pushed out of the Palestinian Territories, and the Israeli government moved to violently suppress demonstrations. In the third stage, from mid 1988 to the collapse of the Israeli unity government in spring 1990, the Israeli government halted further military escalation and focused on a strategyof attrition instead, particularly through economic pressure and mass arrests of Palestinians. In the fourth stage, under new Minister of Defence Moshe Arens, was marked by de-escalation and withdrawal of Israeli soldiers from the main Palestinian population centres.

== Outbreak (December 1987 – January 1988) ==
- 8 December 1987: An Israeli truck driver collids with and kills four Palestinian workers in an accident in the Jabalia refugee camp. As news of the accident spreads through the Gaza Strip, rumours also spread that it was deliberate, arranged in retaliation for the killing of Israeli salesman Shlomo Sakal in Gaza several days earlier. The funeral for the four Palestinian workers later that day is attended by thousands of Gazans and evolves into a demonstration.
- 9 December 1987: Demonstrations over the truck accident continue the next day. When the demonstrations clash with Israeli soldiers, one Palestinian youth is killed, 17-year-old Hatem Abu Sisi. The death inflames the demonstrations.
- 10 December 1987: The first Palestinian death of the Intifada in the West Bank occurs when a 19-year-old is shot and killed after throwing an iron bar at a group of Israeli soldiers.
- 11 December 1987: The Israeli military begins an operation aiming to break the power of Fatah's youth movement in the Balata Camp, after the youth movement had effectively forced the Israeli Civil Administration out of the camp earlier in 1987, in one of the first major clashes of the Intifada in the West Bank. That day, Israeli Minister of Defence Yitzhak Rabin would leave Israel on a 10-day trip to the United States, judging that the unrest was not significantly different to previous outbreaks of Palestinian unrest, which the Israeli military had been able to suppress relatively quickly.
- 14 December 1987: Ahmed Yassin and other Muslim Brotherhood leaders in the Gaza Strip announce their intention to re-organise the Islamist Mujama al-Islamiya charity into an armed group that will lead a holy war against Israel: Ḥarakat al-Muqāwamat al-Islāmiyyah, the Islamic Resistance Movement, abbreviated as Hamas, the Arabic word for zeal.
- 15 December 1987: Israeli Minister of Industry Ariel Sharon announces a controversial move into a flat in the Muslim Quarter of the Old City of Jerusalem, contributing to the spread of the unrest into East Jerusalem.
- 16 December 1987: The first general strike of the uprising took place across the occupied territories, building on an already widespread commercial strike by shopkeepers in several major cities and smaller uncoordinated local strike actions.
- 20 December 1987: Israeli authorities order shut all Palestinian primary and secondary schools for three days, the first Palestine-wide school closure order of the Intifada.
- 21 December 1987: A general strike is held by Arab citizens of Israel in solidary with Palestinians inside the occupied territories, named the Day of Peace.
- 22 December 1987: Israeli Minister of Defence Yitzhak Rabin returns from the United States and the Israeli government significantly increases its measures to try and suppress the still-growing unrest, including mass arrests, opening new detention centres to accommodate the surge in Palestinian detainees, banning the circulation of Al-Quds, the most widely-read newspaper in Palestine, and preparing to carry out deportations of Palestinians.
- 27 December 1987: Israeli military courts begin mass trials of detained Palestinians, sparking controversy over the fairness of the trials. In response to the trials, all Palestinian lawyers declared a strike.
- 1 January 1988: Palestinians would mark Fatah Day, the anniversary of Fatah's first military operation. Although most demonstrations were more or less suppressed by a new surge of Israeli troops into the occupied territories, shopkeepers across Palestine declare a two-week commercial strike in protest over Israeli efforts to break the smaller-scale commercial strikes taking place since the start of the unrest.
- 3 January 1988: the Israeli announced the deportation of nine Palestians, who it accused of being "leading activists and organizers involved in incitement and subversive activity." The first mass deportation of the Intifada, it significantly inflamed tensions. The United Nations Security Council would unanimously adopt United Nations Security Council Resolution 607 condemning the deportations, marking the first American vote for a Security Council resolution criticising Israel since the early 1980s.
- 5 January 1988: A group of prominent Palestinian moderates, including nonviolence advocate Mubarak Awad, philosopher Sari Nusseibeh, lawyer Ghassan Shakaa, and journalist Hanna Siniora, announce the launch of a coordinated non-violent civil disobedience campaign against the Israeli occupation.
- 8 January 1988: The Unified National Leadership of the Uprising (UNLU) announces its formation by releasing its first communiqué. Consisting of local leaders from four leftist and secular PLO factions (the Palestinian Communist Party, the DFLP, the PFLP, and Fatah) and based on the actions of decentralised popular committees drawn from leaders of local grassroots organisations (like trade unions, student unions, and women's committees) that were already organised local actions, the UNLU would quickly gain widespread legitimacy in the eyes of Palestinians and would direct a campaign largely based on civil disobedience, including banning Palestinians from using fireams.

== UNLU-directed uprising (January 1988 – March 1990) ==
=== January–February 1988 ===
- 10 January 1988: the Israeli military orders Birzeit University closed. By the end of the month, all Palestinian universities would be ordered shut. All of the closures would last until at least 1990, with the Birzeit closure lasting until 1992.
- 11 January 1988: 16-year-old Palestinian youth Rabah Hussein Ghanam is shot and killed by Israeli settlers in Beitin, the first Palestinian to be killed by settlers during the Intifada.
- 19 January 1988: Israeli Minister of Defence Yitzhak Rabin publicly announces the "force, might, and beatings" policy, pledging to restore order in the occupied territories through the use of beatings, with Prime Minister Yitzhak Shamir stating several days later that the Israeli government wanted to "put the fear of death into the Arabs of the territories". The same day, the Israeli government invokes emergency powers over East Jerusalem despite the government considering the city part of the State of Israel. In the following days, the Israeli government imposes a curfew on the East Jerusalem neighbourhood of At-Tur, the first curfew to be imposed in East Jerusalem since 1967.
- 21 January 1988: An Israeli military unit under the command of Yehuda Meir breaks the bones of handcuffed Palestinians in Huwara and Beita, Nablus. The incident would become one of the most high-profile cases of Rabin's "force, might, and beatings" policy after Meir was put on trial and claimed that Rabin had personally ordered him to break the bones of Palestinian protestors.
- 3 February 1988: The Israeli governments orders all Palestinian primary and secondary schools in the West Bank shut indefinitely. The schools were allowed to re-open four months later, in June 1988. Palestinian schools would continue to face closure orders throughout the year, losing more than 80% of school days to closures. Alternative forms of schooling, such as UNRWA study-at-home kits based on the Israeli-approved pre-Intifada curriculum and underground classrooms led by the UNLU's popular committees, would be banned by the Israeli government.
- 15 February 1988: Labor Alignment MK Abdulwahab Darawshe announces his departure from the party in protest over Rabin's policies towards the uprising and founds the Arab Democratic Party, the first party aimed solely at the interests of Arab citizens of Israel. Also that day, the passenger ferry Al Awda is sunk by a mine while docked in Cyprus, ending a journey planned by the PLO to ferry Palestinian exiles to the Israeli port of Haifa (mimicking the 1947 journey of the SS Exodus).
- 24 February 1988: Mohammed al Ayed, a Palestinian man employed by the Israeli Civil Administration, is lynched by a Palestinian mob in Qabatiya, the first significant incident of Palestinian internal political violence in the Intifada. The Israeli authorities subsequently impose a 37-day curfew on the town.
- 25 February 1988: United States Secretary of State George Shultz would arrive in the Middle East on a visit to prepare a new peace initiative. Also that day, the beating of Palestinian teenagers Wael Joudeh and Osamah Joudeh by Israeli soldiers is captured by a CBS News team, sparking international controversy.

=== March–July 1988 ===
- 4 March 1988: United States Secretary of State George Shultz formally proposes a peace initiative based on the idea of an international peace conference to negotiate the establishment of an interim autonomous Palestinian authority and an ultimate "land for peace" solution, as well as the inclusion of Palestinians in the conference as part of a joint Jordanian-Palestinian delegation. The initiative would ultimately fail to win the support of any government except for the Egyptian government.
- 6 March 1988: Palestinians working for the Israeli Civil Administration begin mass resignations.
- 7 March 1988: PLO militants infiltrate the Negev from Egypt and hijack a civilian bus carrying workers to the Negev Nuclear Research Center, killing three Israelis.
- 15 March 1988: The Israeli military cuts the phone lines out of the occupied territories, leaving them unusable until 1989. Several days later, the military declares the Gaza Strip to be a closed military area, banning the media from entering.
- 19 March 1988: The Israeli government carries out a new campaign against Fatah's Shabiba youth movement, arresting hundreds of activists and closing youth centres across Palestine.
- 20 March 1988: Israeli soldier Sergeant Moshe Katz is shot and killed in Bethlehem, the first Israeli to be killed inside the occupied territories in the Intifada.
- 6 April 1988: The Beita incident occurs, a confrontation between Palestinian residents of Beita and Israeli settlers from Elon Moreh, during which two Palestinians one settler, Tirza Porat, were shot and killed by Israeli forces. Porat would be the first Israeli civilian to die in the West Bank in the Intifada. Controversy was sparked after the Israeli government initially reported that Porat had killed by Palestinian stone-throwers and subsequently carried out collective punishment measures against the Palestinian residents of Beita.
- 16 April 1988: Top PLO aide, tasked with coordinating between the leadership in exile and the occupied territories, Khalil al-Wazir (known as Abu Jihad) is assassinated by Israeli commandos in Tunis. The assassination sparks an intense week of Palestinian demonstrations and rioting, during which 12 Palestinians are shot and killed by Israeli forces.
- 21 April 1988: Israel celebrates the 40th anniversary of its independence. That day, Prime Minister Shamir and American President Ronald Reagan sign an agreement formalising a previously-issued memorandum of understanding on strategic cooperation between the two states.
- 24 April 1988: PLO chair Yasser Arafat makes an unexpected state visit to Syria, in an attempt to mend relations between the PLO and the government of Hafez al-Assad.
- 6 May 1988: Mubarak Awad is arrested by the Israeli authorities and deported.
- 7 June 1988: The 1988 Arab League summit begins. The only topic of discussion during the summit would be the Intifada, with the Arab League indicating its support for the uprising, but turning down the PLO's request for substantial new funding. The same day, the Israeli-appointed Mayor of Al-Bireh, Hassan al-Tawil, is assassinated by Palestinians.
- 20 June 1988: The Israeli authorities shut down Samiha Khalil's Inash Al-Usra Association, one of the largest charitable organisations in the occupied territories.
- 6 July 1988: The Israeli authorities announced that all Palestinians injured during demonstrations wishing to enter a hospital in the occupied territories must receive permission from the Israeli Civil Administration and must pay a fee.
- 31 July 1988: King Hussein of Jordan announces that Jordan officially renounces all claims to the West Bank and will recognise the PLO as the only legitimate representative of the Palestinian people.

=== August–November 1988 ===
- 16 August 1988: Palestinians incarcerated under administrative detention in the Ktzi'ot Prison riot over conditions in the prison camp. Two of the prisoners were killed by Israeli forces putting down the riot.
- 17 August 1988: The Israeli government deports four prominent Palestinian activists to Lebanon and orders 25 more deported, the largest single deportation of Palestinians by Israel since 1967. The deportations were justified on the basis that the activists were allegedly key figures in the UNLU's popular committees. The next day, the Israeli government would formally designate the popular committees as terrorist organisations.
- 18 August 1988: Hamas releases its founding charter, containing a significant amount of genocidal and antisemitic language.
- 30 September 1988: Israeli settler leader Moshe Levinger shoots and kills Palestinian shopkeeper Hassan Abdul Azis Salah in Hebron. Levinger also faced charges for an incident in May 1988 in which he broke into a Palestinian home in Hebron and assaulted the family.
- 30 October 1988: Palestinians perpetrate the Jericho bus firebombing terrorist attack, killing five Israeli civilians, including three children. The attack marks the first Israeli civilians to be murdered by Palestinians during the Intifada.
- 1 November 1988: The 1988 Israeli legislative election is held. The election returns a deadlock in the Knesset between left-wing and right-wing parties, resulting in another grand coalition between Likud and the Israeli Labor Party.
- 15 November 1988: The Palestinian National Council (PNC) adopts the Palestinian Declaration of Independence, establishing the PLO as a government-in-exile and signalling its willigness to accept a two-state solution. The Israeli government rejects the declaration and imposes a week-long curfew on the occupied territories to prevent demonstrations, while the UNLU celebrates it. The only notable Palestinian faction to reject the declaration is Hamas.

=== December 1988 – March 1990 ===
- 13 December 1988: PLO leader Yasser Arafat gives a significant speech to the United Nations General Assembly on the Palestinian Declaration of Independence in which he announces that the PLO will formally renounce violence and will accept United Nations Security Council Resolution 242. The speech is given at the United Nations Office at Geneva after the American government controversially blocked Arafat from attending the General Assembly meeting at the United Nations headquarters in New York. In the days following the speech, the American government announced that it would be willing to open direct diplomacy with the PLO for the first time.
- 20 January 1989: The Israeli government orders all Palestinian schools in the West Bank and the Gaza Strip indefinitely closed again. This school closure order would last for six months, until late July 1989.
- 8 February 1989: A large-scale prison riot breaks out at the Megiddo prison.
- 16 February 1989: Hamas carries out its first attack against Israel, abducting and murdering Israeli soldier Avi Sasportas.
- 10 April 1989: One Palestinian is killed by an extremist Israeli militant from the Sicarii group.
- 13 April 1989: The IDF carries out the 13 April 1989 Nahalin raid on the Palestinian village of Nahalin, during which five Palestinian youth were killed.
- 3 May 1989: Hamas carries out its second attack against Israel, abducting and murdering Israeli soldier Ilan Saadon. Following the attack, the Israeli government would cut off its contacts with and Hamas and would arrest over 250 Hamas activists, include its leader Ahmed Yassin, in Israel's first major crackdown on Hamas.
- 6 July 1989: The Palestinian Islamic Jihad perpetrates the 1989 Tel Aviv–Jerusalem bus attack, the first Palestinian suicide attack in history, killing 16 civilians.
- 15 September 1989: Egyptian President Hosni Mubarak formally proposes a 10-point peace initiative based on elections.
- 20 September 1989: the Israeli military imposes a blockade on the town of Beit Sahour in an attempt to break the Beit Sahour tax strike. The blockade would last for 42 days.
- 29 September 1989: The Israeli government formally designates Hamas as a terrorist group.
- March 1990: the Israeli national unity government collapses, with the Labor Party sparking controversy with its attempt to form a government. Shamir would subsequently negotiate a coalition with minor creates to create a right-wing-only government.
- March 1990: The last major sweep of arrests of UNLU members is carried out by the Israeli military. Following the arrests, what remained of the UNLU was taken over by more senior prominent Palestinians, such as Faisal Husseini , Zahira Kamal, and Ghassan Khatib, with more direct links to the PLO leadership-in-exile.

== Loss of direction and fracturing of the uprising (April 1990 – October 1991) ==
=== 1990 ===
- 20 May 1990: The Oyoun Qara massacre is perpetrated by Israeli Ami Popper, killing seven Palestinians waiting at a bus stop.
- 30 May 1990: The Palestinian Liberation Front, a minor PLO faction, attempts an amphibious landing near Tel Aviv. Most of the militants were either captured or killed by Israeli forces. After PLO chair Yasser Arafat says that he cannot expel the PLF from the PLO, while issuing a statement both condemning attacks against civilians in general, the American government suspends its diplomacy with the PLO, less than two years after it began.
- 2 August 1990: Saddam Hussein's Iraq launches an invasion of Kuwait. The PLO's stance on the invasion, widely interpreted as supporting Iraq, as well as widespread grassroots support for Hussein among Palestinians, would spark international controversy and caused significant damage to international sympathies towards the Initifada.
- 8 October 1990: 17 Palestinians are killed by the Israeli Border Police in the 1990 Temple Mount killings. The killings occurred after the extremist Israeli Temple Mount Faithful marched on the Temple Mount to lay a cornerstone for a Third Temple, triggering rioting by Muslim Palestinians, which the Border Police attempted to disperse using live ammunition.
- 14 December 1990: Hamas carried out a significant terrorist attack in Jaffa, murdering three Israeli civilians in an aluminium factory in the city. Following the attack, anti-Arab riots broke out in the city.

=== 1991 ===
- 14 January 1991: PLO head of intelligence Salah Khalaf is assassinated by Abu Nidal Organization militants. The assassination was rumoured to have been carried out in revenge for Khalaf's opposition to the Iraqi invasion of Kuwait.
- 16 January 1991: The Gulf War air campaign begins. The same day, the Israeli government imposes a curfew on all Palestinian residents of the occupied territories, aiming to prevent Palestinian unrest amid Hussein's threats to Israel. The curfew would last until March 1991, by which point Iraq had been comprehensively defeated in the Gulf War and Kuwait liberated. Two Israeli civilians would be directly killed by Iraqi missile attacks against Israel during the war, with several dozen killed indirectly.
- 28 April 1991: Israeli peace activist Abie Nathan begins a 40-day hunger strike calling for the Israeli government to legalise contacts between Israelis and the PLO.
- 18 June 1991: Elections are held to the Hebron Chamber of Commerce, the first elections permitted by the Israeli government in the occupied territories since the 1976 West Bank local elections. Six of the eleven seats were won by candidates affiliated with Hamas, five by PLO-affiliated candidates, and one by an independent candidate.
- 18 October 1991: Al-Azhar University – Gaza is established.
- 30 October to 4 November 1991: the Madrid Conference of 1991 is held.

== End of the uprising and dawn of the Oslo era (November 1991 – September 1993) ==
=== 1991 ===
- 1 December 1991: Israeli settler Zvi Klein is killed by Palestinian militants. In response, the Israeli military imposes a two-month curfew on Palestine residents of the Ramallah–Al-Bireh area.
- 16 December 1991: The United Nations General Assembly votes to revoke its 1975 United Nations General Assembly Resolution 3379, which had defined Zionism a form of racism.

=== 1992 ===
- 1 January 1992: Hamas publicly announces the creation of the Al-Qassam Brigades as its military branch, after the Brigades' first attack, the murder of Doron Shoshan, the rabbi of the settlement of Kfar Darom.
- 14 February 1992: The Palestinian Islamic Jihad carries out an attack on an Israeli military training base in the Manasseh Hills, killing three Israeli soldiers. The attack would come to be known as the Night of the Pitchforks.
- 17 March 1992: Hamas carries out a significant terrorist attack in Israel, murdering 19-year-old Israeli civilian Ilanit Ohana and 41-year-old Arab citizen of Israel Abed al-Karim in a knife attack in Jaffa, injuring twenty other Israeli civilians, mostly schoolgirls gathered for Purim celebrations.
- 7 April 1992: PLO chairman Yasser Arafat survives a plane crash, after his plane ran into a sandstorm over Libya while returning to Tunis from Sudan.
- 29 April 1992: Birzeit University is allowed to partly re-open by the Israeli military, ending its four-year-long closure, the last of the Palestinian universities allowed to re-open.
- 24 May 1992: 15-year Israeli Helena Rapp is stabbed to death by a Palestinian Islamic Jihad militant. The murder is followed by five days of anti-Arab rioting in Bat Yam.
- 23 June 1992: The Israeli Labor Party under Yitzhak Rabin win the 1992 Israeli legislative election and Rabin becomes Prime Minister.
- 14 July 1992: A group of Fatah Black Panthers militants escaping from Israeli forces flees onto the An-Najah National University campus, ythe same day that the campus student union was due to hold elections, resulting in a four-day standoff between students and Israeli forces.
- 22 September 1992: The first of the French Hill attacks is perpetrated, with a Hamas militant killing Israeli border policeman Avinoam Peretz in the settlement of French Hill.
- 13 December 1992: Israeli police officer Nissim Toledano is abducted and killed by Hamas. In the following days, the Israeli government would carry out a mass arrest of over 1500 Palestinians suspected of links to Hamas and the Palestinian Islamic Jihad, and would deport 400 of them to Lebanon. The deportation, the largest mass deportation of Palestinians since the Nakba, was intended to eliminate Hamas as a security threat, however, it is widely considered to have backfired, as it significantly raised the profile of Hamas and led to Hamas forging ties with Lebanese Islamist group Hezbollah, who provided Hamas with resources and training. All of the deportees were allowed to return to the occupied territories by the end of 1993.

=== 1993 ===
- 16 April 1993: Hamas perpetrates the Mehola Junction bombing, the first Palestinian suicide bombing attack in the Israeli–Palestinian conflict.
- 13 September 1993: The Oslo I Accord accord is signed by PLO leader Yasser Arafat and Israeli Prime Minister Yitzhak Rabin following secret negotiations in Oslo, Norway. The accord, the first of the Oslo Accords, outlines a peace process, including the establishment of the Palestinian Authority as an interim autonomous Palestinian administration to replace the Israeli Civil Administration and mutual recognition between the PLO and Israel.
