= Outbreak of the First Intifada =

On 8 December 1987, four Palestinians were killed in an accidental collision with an Israeli truck at the Erez Crossing, in northern Gaza. The accident sparked a significant wave of violent rioting and unrest across the Gaza Strip, which would soon spread to the West Bank and East Jerusalem. By mid-January 1988, with over 20 Palestinians having been shot and killed by Israeli forces, the unrest had coalesced into a popular uprising opposing the Israeli occupation of Palestine and based on civil disobedience under the Unified National Leadership of the Uprising: the First Intifada.

Multiple researchers and commentators have defined a first phase of the uprising as lasting from 8 December 1987 through to January 1988. Palestinian researcher Salim Tamari characterised the first phase of the First Intifada as lasting through December 1987, marked by spontaneous civil insurrection, with a second phase marked by the coalescing of the uprising around the UNLU beginning in January 1988. The Jerusalem Media & Communication Centre has defined a first phase of the Intifada as "the first few months of the uprising," characterising the phase by mass Palestinian protests, violent repression by the Israeli authorities, and shock and condemnation by international observers. Ruth Margolies Beitler of the United States Military Academy has characterised a first phase of the Intifada as occurring until mid-January 1988, marked by Israeli assumptions that the unrest was no different to previous waves of Palestinian unrest since 1967 and could be suppressed using the usual tactics. Efraim Inbar of Bar-Ilan University has also characterised the Israeli government's response to the Intifada as having a first phase during December 1987 in which the government was caught off guard and applied its usual methods of suppressing Palestinian unrest.

== Underlying social and political factors ==
Throughout the 1980s, the social and political situation within the occupied territories became increasingly volatile. Palestinian grievances against the Israeli occupation increased, including over restrictions on political freedoms, increased Israeli settlement, and the subordination of Palestinian economic development to Israeli economic needs. Palestinian grievances against other states also increased, with a growing sentiment that other Arab states would be unable to help free Palestine from the occupation. At the same time, the Palestinian nationalist movement underwent a significant internal shift, with the PLO central leadership finding themselves in increasingly distant exile, bother increasingly powerless and corrupt, while Palestinians inside the occupied territories became increasingly involved in mass civilian organising (such as trade unions, student unions, and women's committees).

Conditions in the Gaza Strip were particularly precarious, with some Israeli commentators referring to it as a "time bomb." The Gazan citrus and fishing industries were on the verge of failure due to Israeli restrictions, a lack of investment (with Palestinians paying more in taxes to the Israeli Civil Administration than the Civil Administration invested in the occupied territories) had left Gazan schools and hospitals overcrowded and in poor condition, and even university-educated Gazans had to struggle to gain short-term manual employment each morning in Israel, where they were underpaid and under protected compared to their Israeli colleagues. The Gazan population, which had grown rapidly, was increasingly young and increasingly radical, including a growing influence of Islamism. Palestinian refugees also consisted a major portion of the Gazan population, with living conditions in the refugee camps being extremely poor. Meanwhile, Israeli land seizures and Israeli settlements in Gaza grew considerably, taking up disproportionate amounts of Gazan land and resources.

== Events ==
=== Prelude ===
1987 had been a turbulent year inside the occupied territories, both in the West Bank and in the Gaza Strip. Several commentators have characterised the year as one of increasing volatility and simmering unrest in the occupied Palestinian territories, beginning with the December 1986 Birzeit University protests. According to Joost Hiltermann of the International Crisis Group, "the greatest surprise, with hindsight, was that the uprising had not occurred before December 1987... from late 1986 on, there was definitely 'something in the air.'" Several major incidents occurred in the Gaza Strip that year, including a high-profile prison escape of six Palestinian Islamic Jihad members in May and the murder of the Israeli Military Police commander in the Strip in August. In November, a significant wave of unrest broke out in Gaza with the arrest and deportation of Abdul Aziz Awda, the PIJ's spiritual leader and a popular Islamic University of Gaza lecturer, as well as the death of Intisar al-Attara, a 16-year-old girl from Deir al-Balah who was killed by settlers.

December 1987 began with more volatility and violence in the Gaza Strip. On 6 December, Israeli salesman Shlomo Sakal was murdered in central Gaza City, stabbed in the neck by a Palestinian. Although some Palestinian passers-by attempted to provide first aid, the attacker escaped, and none of the passers-by cooperated with the Israeli military's investigation. As a result, the Israeli military imposed a curfew on central Gaza City. The same day, the Israeli government controversially announced that it was taking over part of the Palestinian Jerusalem District Electricity Company. The next day, Israeli Minister of Foreign Affairs and Israeli Labor Party leader Shimon Peres sparked controversy in Israel when he gave a presentation to the Knesset's Foreign Affairs and Defense Committee in which he called for Israel to withdraw from Gaza, arguing that the costs of maintaining the occupation over the Strip outweighed the security benefits. The presentation was denounced by the Labor Party's coalition partners, including Likud leader and Prime Minister Yitzhak Shamir.

=== Truck accident and initial unrest in Gaza ===
In the afternoon of 8 December 1987, an Israeli military truck accidentally drove into a line of cars at the Erez Crossing, at the northern border between the Gaza Strip and Israel. Four Palestinian workers, who had been returning to Gaza from their jobs in Israel, were killed in the accident and another seven seriously injured. A significant portion of the Gazan working population passed through the Erez Crossing daily, and the Crossing had acquired a poor reputation among Gazans due to frequent delays and checks imposed by Israeli forces guarding the Crossing. As a result, the accident was witnessed by hundreds of Palestinians.

Following the accident, rumours spread quickly throughout Gaza that the accident had been deliberate, arranged in retaliation for Sakal's murder. The rumours mixed with other misinformation, including a rumour that the truck driver had been Sakal's brother, a rumour of a killing of a Palestinian worker in the Israeli city of Ashkelon in retaliation for Sakal's murder, alleged poisoning of Gazan wells by Israeli soldiers, and an alleged secret return of PLO chairman Yasser Arafat to Gaza, sneaking past Israeli border guards in disguise. According to Bradley Burston of The Jerusalem Post, an effective "ghetto telegraph" operated in Gaza, with high mobility of the population, wide-ranging family networks, and the youthfulness of the population (with many schools having telephones but many homes not having telephones) contributing to the rapid spread of the rumours.

Fundamentalist mosques also played a significant role in spreading the rumours and in inciting the early rioting in the Gaza Strip. Throughout the 1980s, conservative Islamism had experienced significant growth in Gaza, influenced by factors such as the success of the Iranian Revolution, the formation of Hezbollah in Lebanon to fight against Israel after the 1982 Lebanon War, and Israeli support for Islamist groups inside Palestine as a strategy to undermine the influence of the PLO. John Kifner of The New York Times reported on 19 December that there was a "strong Islamic element emerging as a major factor in this round of clashes. Islamic fundamentalist groups, including one called Islamic Holy War, have made strong gains in Gaza in the last 18 months. Loudspeakers in minarets, normally used for calls to prayers, have been urging on demonstrators."

The funerals for three of the dead Palestinian workers, all from Jabalia, was held in Jabalia on the night of 8 December. The funeral was attended by several thousand Gazans, and developed into a demonstration against the Israeli occupation. Demonstrations over the accident continued the next morning, soon confronting Israeli soldiers in Gaza. According to Swedish journalist Nathan Shachar, "refugees clashed with Israeli soldiers on reserve duty, who were stunned by the unexpected assault from young men, women and even children. The Israelis, understaffed and unprepared, fired into the crowds." At least 16 Palestinians would be wounded by Israeli gunfire that day, with one, 17-year-old Hatem Abu Sisi, being killed after a group of youth threw a Molotov cocktail at an Israeli military vehicle.

One key site of early unrest in Gaza was the Al-Shifa Hospital, in northern Gaza City, the hospital which received the first Palestinian casualties of the unrest. As families and friends of the injured Gazans gathered on the hospital grounds, a demonstration broke out, which soon clashed with Israeli soldiers sent to disperse the demonstration. An American news crew on the site of the hospital was also assaulted by some of the demonstrators. Dan Fisher of The Los Angeles Times reported:

"As the wounded from earlier clashes were brought to Shifa, family members and friends gathered in the hospital, its courtyard, and outside on the street, where they were joined by local youths. The crowd swelled with the arrival of anti-Israeli protesters who joined a march organized by the Gaza Lawyers Assn. and other professional groups. Youths built barricades in the streets outside the hospital, burned tires, and taunted the Israeli soldiers sent to control the situation. When the crowds grew bolder, the Israelis fired tear gas, rubber bullets and scores of live rounds, mostly in the air. Dozens of Palestinians were arrested. But about 1:30 p.m., the soldiers charged the crowd."

=== Spread of the unrest to East Jerusalem and the West Bank ===
Although the unrest was first contained within the Gaza Strip, it would spread to the West Bank within a few days. On 10 December, the first Palestinian death of the Intifada in the West Bank occurred in Nablus, when a 19-year-old was shot and killed by Israeli forces after a group of youth began throwing stones and an iron bar at an Israeli military patrol. Later that day, the Israeli authorities imposed a 10-day publication on East Jerusalem-based newspaper Al Fajr for violating Israeli military censorship rules in its coverage of the unrest.

The next day, 11 December, the Balata Camp near Nablus became the site of a major clash between Israeli forces and Palestinian demonstrators. The camp had been a significant site of tension over the previous two years, with Fatah's youth wing having a particularly strong presence in the camp, to the point of making the Israeli Civil Administration's control over the camp tenuous. That day, the Israeli military began an operation aiming to overcome the youth wing's presence, killing several Palestinians and injuring others. Palestinian sources reported four dead: 57-year-old woman Suhaila Kaabi, 17-year-old girl Sahar Al-Jarmi, and 11-year-old boys Abdullah Faour and Ali Ismail Abdullah. The Israeli military reported that three of its soldiers had been injured during the clashes. The deaths brought the overall death toll of the unrest to at least six Palestinians in three days. Writing in early January 1988, John Kifner of The New York Times reported:

"Since early December, Balata has been under something close to a siege as the Israeli military authorities sought to break the hold of the Shabiba, a youth movement loyal to Al Fatah, Yasir Arafat's branch of the Palestine Liberation Organization... Agents of Shin Beth, Israel's domestic security service, went through the refugee district making arrests in nighttime sweeps, according to both residents and Israeli newspaper accounts. Then the tough border police, a paramilitary unit made up largely of Druse Arabs loyal to Israel, was sent in force into Balata. Stone throwers surrounded a border police patrol in the narrow streets, and the unit opened fire, killing 3 people and wounding 10. Then, according to many residents, the border police began breaking down the doors of houses in search of suspects, smashing furniture and other possessions. The army command says it has begun an internal investigation of the incident. At different times Balata has been cordoned off, declared under curfew -which means that no one can leave home, day or night, to work or shop -or, as it was today, heavily patrolled."

The unrest would spread to East Jerusalem on 15 December. That day, Israeli Minister of Industry Ariel Sharon inflamed tensions by moving into a flat in the Muslim Quarter of the Old City of Jerusalem. The move, Sharon's housewarming party attended by many prominent Israeli figures (including Prime Minister Yitzhak Shamir) and guarded by a deployment of hundreds of Israeli police officers, Sharon's poor reputation among Palestinians, and the fact that the flat was leased by the settler Ateret Cohanim movement (which aimed to create a Jewish demographic majority in East Jerusalem), inflamed tensions among Palestinians.

On 16 December, the first general strike of the uprising took place across the occupied territories, building on an already widespread commercial strike by shopkeepers in several major cities and smaller uncoordinated local strike actions. A second Palestine-wide general strike took place in 19 December. Mid-December also saw the emergence of emergency committees among Palestinians. These committees were primarily formed by members of the grassroots organisations (such trade unions, student unions, and women's committees) that had proliferated across Palestine during the 1980s, and provided first aid to Palestinians injured in demonstrations and distributing food in areas placed under curfew. As the unrest continued, these committees began to take on an increasing number of roles, including organising underground classrooms when Israeli authorities ordered schools closed, keeping watch for Israeli patrols, arbitrating disputes between Palestinians, cleaning streets, organising the establishment of cooperatives, as well as distributing leaflets and organising actions such as strikes, petitions, sit-ins, and demonstrations in their local areas. As their roles increased, the emergency committees transformed into popular committees. The Palestinian Communist Party notably played a significant role in the emergence of the popular committees. According to Glenn E. Robinson of the Naval Postgraduate School, "the success of the first popular committees in supplying emergency services to communities under siege helped to consolidate the early gains of the uprising."

On 20 December, Israeli authorities ordered shut all Palestinian primary and secondary schools for three days, the first Palestine-wide school closure order of the Intifada. On 22 December, two Palestinians died from injuries sustained during the unrest, and the Israeli military began a tactic of dropping tear gas onto demonstrations from helicopters.

As Christmas Day approached, with the unrest continuing and at least 21 Palestinians having been killed, commentators and analysts began to consider the unrest as potentially more significant than just another outburst of Palestinian unrest. The Washington Post journalist Glenn Frankel wrote that it was now "clearly the most widespread civil violence to hit Israel and the territories since the occupation began." Michael S. Serrill of Time Magazine described the unrest as "days of rage in Israel’s occupied territories. In the past two weeks, widespread unrest has not only turned the Gaza Strip into a war zone but also spawned strikes and violence in the West Bank and East Jerusalem. Faced with the worst riots in the territories since seizing them in the 1967 Six-Day War, Israel responded with an iron fist. Pitched battles between rock- throwing demonstrators and gun-toting soldiers left at least 17 Palestinians dead and more than a hundred wounded. Since the violence started on Dec. 8, hundreds have been arrested and detained."

=== Initial Israeli complacency ===
At the time the unrest began, the Israeli military only had a small number of military units stationed permanently in the occupied territories, with most policing of the occupied territories performed by the Israeli Border Police and the Israeli intelligence services. While there had been previous outbreaks of Palestinian unrest throughout the 1980s, the Israeli authorities had largely been able to suppress those outbreaks within a couple of weeks at most and with limited deployment of military reinforcements. Despite some soldiers noting that their usual methods of dispersing Palestinian demonstrations were becoming less and less effective, few underwent training or were supplied equipment for riot control. According to Sergio Catignani of the University of Sussex, the Israeli military and government interpreted the increase in Palestinian demonstrations and stone-throwing during the 1980s as "individual and sporadic endaevours" that were "not thought to seriously challenge the Israeli occupation." Many in Israeli leadership further believed that the status quo of the occupation was sustainable indefinitely. Swedish journalist Nathan Shachar has argued that Israeli decision makers in the 1980s made "several conceptual mistakes concerning the Palestinians. The most fatal fallacy was that the Palestinians had tacitly accepted the status quo imposed by Israel, including the settlements all over Gaza, the total ban on political activity and the all-pervading presence of the Shabak security service."

When the unrest began, therefore, neither the Israeli government nor military initially thought that the unrest in the occupied territories was of significant concern. On 11 December, Israeli Minister of Defence Yitzhak Rabin left Israel for a ten-day state visit to the United States to negotiate a military pact that would grant Israel many of the same rights regarding American military contracts as NATO members and the purchase of additional F-16 Fighting Falcon fighter jets for the Israeli military to replace the cancelled IAI Lavi programme. Despite concerns over the unrest growing while he was abroad, Rabin refused to cut short his trip.

With Rabin absent, Prime Minister Yitzhak Shamir served as acting Minister of Defence. On 13 December, the Israeli cabinet met and, after hearing from Israeli authorities in the occupied territories, formally issued a statement denying that the territories were in a state of civil revolt. The Israeli government also only initially deployed limited number of military reinforcements to the occupied territories during the first two weeks of the unrest. On 17 December, deputy minister Yossi Beilin began setting up a government task force for handling the unprecented surge of requests for guidelines from Israeli embassies around the world who were being deluged with media requests. On 20 December, the cabinet issued a formal statement saying that the reports of Palestinian casualties in the unrest were "extremely exaggerated."

Rabin returned from the United States on 21 December. The next day, he toured the Gaza Strip and pledged to "adopt steps that will improve order, even if those are painful and will not gain us sympathy in the world," warning that "those who participate in violent demonstrations must know they are taking a serious risk on themselves." Later addressing the Knesset, Rabin announced that the Israeli military would be granted additional powers to suppress the unrest, including to impose stricter curfews, to use live ammunition against leaders of demonstrations, and to have "no limitation" on administrative detention and deportations.

On 23 December, the Security Cabinet of Israel held its first meeting since the beginning of the unrest, during which it decided that the Israeli forces needed to re-establish their authority over the territories even at the cost of international condemnation. Following the meeting, the Israeli government began a significant crackdown on Palestinians, including moving to increase the number of troops deployed to the occupied territories, banned the circulation of Al-Quds, the most widely-read newspaper in Palestine, ordering schools and universities shut, and carried out further waves of mass arrests of suspected leaders of the unrest. By 26 December, the number of Palestinians arrested by the Israeli had reached at least a thousand, with the military having to open two prison camps and to expand the Ansar-2 prison to accommodate the surge of detainees. Prime Minister Shamir stated that "The IDF does not like to kill. It considers itself an army that deters war and attacks, but if there is someone who is not deterred by the IDF, he will pay dearly for this." An Israeli military official quoted by The Jerusalem Post stated that "Where the law allows us to arrest, we will arrest. Where we are allowed to expel, we will expel. There will be no mercy shown."

=== Christmas lull and subsequent resurgence of unrest ===
For a few days over the Christmas period in 1987, the unrest in the occupied Palestinian territories lessened, although some incidents continued, particularly commercial strikes. A report in Bethlehem from The New York Times on Christmas Day described: "An uneasy quiet reigned today throughout the West Bank and the Gaza Strip as Israeli security forces continued making arrests... 'Like any wave there is a peak and then it quiets down,' the army spokesman, Ephraim Lapid, said. 'This is a relative quieting down.'" Mayor Bethlehem Elias Freij cancelled his traditional Christmas Day reception for the first time because of the unrest. The Jewish Telegraphic Agency reported shortly after Christmas Day that: "Israeli security forces will remain in strength and in a high state of alert in the territories, at least through Jan. 1. That is the anniversary of the founding of Al Fatah, the mainstream terrorist group of the Palestine Liberation Organization. The occasion has triggered disturbances in the past. But military sources cited the peaceful Christmas celebrations in Bethlehem and other Christian sites as evidence that calm has been restored and 'we are in full control of the situation.'"

On 27 December, the Israeli military began the trials of the hundreds of Palestinians who had been arrested since 8 December, held under military law, with no right of appeal, and with Israeli lawyers called up for IDF reserve duty, with the aim of completing the trials as quickly as possible. The proceedings of the trials attracted significant concern over their fairness. Yaron Rabinowitz, an Israeli former military prosector in Gaza, claimed that "I witnessed trials in which a group of 40 defendants were brought before a judge. Those who pleaded guilty had to step forward and raise their hands. This is no way to hold a trial." Other legal criticis inside Israel dubbed the trials "assembly-line justice." In response to the trials, all Palestinian lawyers declared a strike.

On 29 December, Rabin stated the American government's criticism of his handling of the unrest was "centered against administrative detentions and expulsions on the ground that they conflict with the Geneva Convention. But we act according to our own laws. We will continue with arrests, punishment and expulsions." The same day, the Israeli government carried out a mass arrest of several Palestinian terrorists who had been released in the 1985 Jibril Agreement.

Fatah Day, 1 January 1988, passed relatively quietly, with a fresh surge of Israeli troops into the territories effectively deterring some demonstrations from being held that day, although some rioting still occurred. However, the day was met with another Palestine-wide general strike. When Israeli forces attempted to prevent shopkeepers from participating in the strike by breaking open the locks and shutters of Palestinian shops, shopkeepers across the occupied territories would declare a two-week long commercial strike. Israeli forces would prove unable to effectively suppress the commercial strike, despite increased attempts, as shopkeepers allowed their shops to stand with broken locks and few Palestinians attempting to loot the unlocked shops.

On 3 January, the Israeli announced the deportation of nine Palestinians, who it accused of being "leading activists and organizers involved in incitement and subversive activity." The deportations were carried out under the Defence (Emergency) Regulations, leftover from British rule in Mandatory Palestine, and despite expectations that the appeals process for the orders might take several weeks, the first four were deported to Lebanon on 13 January 1988. Seven of the nine had previously spent time in Israeli custody, with some having been released in the 1985 Jibril Agreement. The nine deportees were:

- Jibril Rajoub, a Fatah militant from Dura, Hebron,
- Furayi Ahmed Khalil Khayri, a Fatah trade unionist in the Gaza Strip,
- Adil Nafa Hamad, a leader of the Fatah youth movement in the Qalandia Camp,
- Hussam Uthman Mohammed Hadar, a Fatah activist in the Balata Camp,
- Bashir al-Khairy, a Popular Front for the Liberation of Palestine militant from Ramallah,
- Jamal Mohammed Shakir Jabara, a Fatah militant from Qalqilya,
- Mohammed Abu Samara, an Islamic University of Gaza student and Islamist activist,
- Hasan Ghanim Mohammed Abu Shakra, an Islamist fundamentalist from Khan Yunis,
- Khalil Kuka, an Islamist fundamentalist imam from the Al-Shati refugee camp.

The deportation order inflamed tensions. Further inflaming tensions on 3 January was the death of Haniya Suleiman Zarawneh, a 25-year-old Palestinian woman, in Al-Ram. The 23rd Palestinian to be killed since the start of the unrest, Zarawneh had been hanging up her laundry outside of her house when she was shot by an Israeli soldier chasing after a group of teenagers who had been throwing stones at Israeli vehicles at a nearby intersection. The soldier, as well as the commander of the military unit involved, were both suspended by the Israeli military.

=== Coalescing of the unrest into a popular uprising and new Israeli measures ===
According to Ralph Mandel of the American Jewish Year Book, by the 4th of January 1988, "there were incipient signs that the uprising was seeking new directions, and that the demonstrations and riots were the prelude to more institutionalized forms of civil revolt."

On 5 January 1988, a group of prominent Palestinian moderates, including nonviolence advocate Mubarak Awad, philosopher Sari Nusseibeh, lawyer Ghassan Shakaa, and journalist Hanna Siniora, announce the launch of a coordinated non-violent civil disobedience campaign. The first actions would take would be boycotts of Israeli-produced cigarettes, followed by boycotts of more Israeli-produced goods, as well as refusing to pay taxes to the Israeli Civil Administration and refusing to work inside Israel. Although the Israeli military prevented most members of the group from attending the press conference, Siniora and Awad jointly announced the launch of the campaign. During the conference, Siniora declared that "Gandhi started with salt. We are starting with cigarettes." Several days later, members of the same group as well as several others, including former Mayor of Hebron Mustafa Natshe and acting president of Birzeit University Gabi Baramki, would hold a second conference formulating a list of political demands:

1. That the Israeli government follow the Fourth Geneva Convention, abolish the Defence (Emergency) Regulations, and end the Iron Fist policy;
2. That the Israeli government follow United Nations Security Council Resolution 605 and United Nations Security Council Resolution 607;
3. The release of all Palestinian arrested since the start of the unrest;
4. And end to deportations and administrative detention of Palestinians;
5. That the Israeli military withdraw from Palestinian population centres and lift its curfews;
6. That the Israeli government establish a formal inquiry into the conduct of Israeli soldiers and settlers inside the occupied territories and in Israeli prisons;
7. A freeze on settlements and land expropriation;
8. Upholding the Status Quo in Jerusalem and respect of sites considered holy by Muslims and Christians;
9. Abolishing taxes imposed by the Israeli authorities on Palestinians;
10. Ending the ban on political meetings inside the occupied territories and allowing Palestinians to elect city councils;
11. The return of social security payments of Palestinians working inside Israel, who had the payments deducted from their salaries but were not entitled to social security benefits;
12. Ending restrictions on industrial and resource development inside the occupied territories;
13. Ending protectionist measures that restricted the export of Palestinian goods from the occupied territories but allowed Israeli goods to be easily imported into the territories;
14. Ending the ban on contacts with the PLO and on participation in the Palestinian National Council, so that Palestinians inside the occupied territories could take on a larger role in the international Palestinians movement.

In the following days, prompted by growing concerns over the effects that the increasing number of Palestinians being shot and killed by Israeli forces was having on Israel's reputation, the Israeli cabinet adopted a new policy to suppress the unrest: what Minister of Defence Yitzhak Rabin described as "force, might, and beatings." The policy ordered Israeli troops to refrain from the use of live ammunition to disperse protests, with the aim of minimising the number of deaths, and instead to beat detained protestors, with the aim of preventing them from participating in further protests and deterring other Palestinians from joining protests. The Jerusalem Post quoted a senior Israeli military official as saying that the policy was aimed towards "striking fear of the army" into Palestinian protestors, and another told Haaretz that the policy's aim was to make Palestinians "scared of the army, and so that one day we could get most of the units out of the territory, when people will remember and know for the future."

By 6 January 1988, at least 1900 Palestinians had been arrested by Israeli forces since the beginning of the unrest.

On 8 January 1988, the Unified National Leadership of the Uprising (UNLU) announced its formation via the release of its first communiqué. The UNLU was led by a decentralised leadership drawn from local sections of four secular and left-wing PLO factions (the Palestinian Communist Party, the DFLP, the PFLP, and Fatah) and based itself on the actions of the popular committees that had emerged since the start of the unrest. Operating clandestinely and largely independently from the PLO leadership in exile in Tunisia (although still pledging allegiance to the PLO), the UNLU quickly achieved widespread legitimacy among Palestinians and was able to effectively coordinate the activities of the Intifada during the first two years of the uprising. It primarily advanced a less violent strategy than the PLO's guerilla warfare, endorsing stone-throwing and Molotov cocktails inside the occupied territories but banning Palestinians from using firearms, and emphasised dual power and civil disobedience, encouraging strike action, refusal to pay taxes to of work for the Israeli Civil Administration, boycotts of Israeli goods, and withdrawal of Palestinian labour from Israeli businesses, as well as the creation of cooperatives, volunteer medical committees, and underground classrooms. The UNLU's second leaflet, released days after the first, would contain a list of political demands, including an end to the Israeli Iron Fist policy, for Sharon to be evicted from his recently purchased flat in the Old City of Jerusalem, the withdrawal of Israeli forces from Palestinian cities, the dissolution of municipal councils appointed by the Israeli Civil Administration to replace the elected councils, and closure of several prisons with a notorious reputation among Palestinians.

== Reactions ==
=== Among Palestinians ===
The outbreak of the unrest caught the Palestine Liberation Organisation (PLO) by surprise. Since its 1982 withdrawal from Lebanon, the PLO leadership had been based in exile in Tunis, Tunisia, far away from the occupied Palestinian territories. As a result, the PLO had also grown increasingly distant from the politics of the occupied territories, and many in the PLO's leadership, including chairman Yasser Arafat initially saw the outbreak of the Intifada as a threat to their status within the Palestinian movement. On the evening of 25 December 1987, three militants from the Palestinian Liberation Front, a minor PLO faction, attempted to infiltrate Israel from Jordan, failing and being captured by Israeli forces. Thomas L. Friedman of The New York Times wrote that the attack was interpreted by many as the PLO wanting "to impress upon both the Palestinians and the Arab world at large that the guerrilla organization outside Israel is still on the cutting edge of the armed struggle and has not lost the initiative to Palestinians living in the West Bank and Gaza." The Palestinian Central Council would finally hold an emergency meeting in Baghdad on 9 January 1988 to discuss the unrest, and formally speak out in support of the uprising.

The Muslim Brotherhood in the Gaza Strip was also caught by surprise. Led by Ahmed Yassin and his Mujama al-Islamiya charity network, the Brotherhood had spent the 1970s and 1980s building its influence in Gaza without confronting the Israeli occupation (while receiving some support from the Israeli government), in the aim of Islamicising Palestinian society so that it would eventually be ready to fight a holy war between Muslims and Jews against Israel. In the days following the outbreak of unrest, Yassin and several other Brotherhood leaders, such as Abdul Fatah Dukhan, Abdel Aziz al-Rantisi, and Salah Shehade, convened to debate how they should respond. Faced with pressure from their rivalry with the more militant Palestinian Islamic Jihad, which had split from the Brotherhood in the early 1980s to pursue armed struggle, and the increasing radicalism of its own youth members, the leaders decided to begin armed struggle against Israel and to try and seize control of the Intifada from secular leftist factions. To do so, they re-organised the Brotherhood into a new movement: Harakat al-Muqawamah al-Islamiyyah, the Islamic Resistance Movement, abbreviated as Hamas, the Arabic word for zeal.

=== Among Israelis ===
Both centre-left and right-wing politicians expressed support for the crackdown on the unrest. Minister of Defence and Israeli Labor Party member Yitzhak Rabin was the politician with the most influence over the crackdown, with Efraim Inbar of Bar-Ilan University writing that Rabin "was generally accepted as an authority on security matters. The political constellation of the late 1980s allowed him to be the final arbiter in affairs pertaining to the IDF, its use in the territories and outside it, with little interference from other cabinet members. His perceptions of the situation and his prescriptions constituted the most influential input in forming the Israeli response to the intifada." Prime Minister and Likud leader Yitzhak Shamir stated that "Our situation is like the picture of the giant Gulliver entering into a confrontation with dozens of dwarfs when one hand and two legs are tied, and there are declarations all the time that Gulliver is the bully." Minister of Foreign Affairs and Israeli Labor Party leader Shimon Peres refused to criticise Shamir's and Likud's positions towards the unrest, despite previous significant differences between their policies towards Palestine, saying that they had "disagreements and arguments, but not on the subject of the struggle against terrorism." Likud MK Ehud Olmert stated that "force must be met with force." Permanent Representative of Israel to the United Nations Benjamin Netanyahu stated that "the first responsibility of any government is to maintain law and order. These disorders are anything but spontaneous. We have a real problem, facing a deliberate campaign of terror."

The crackdown on the unrest received widespread support among the Israeli population. A 26 December 1987 Yedioth Ahronoth opinion poll found that 69% of Israelis wished for the government to take tougher measures, with 80% in favour of deporting Palestinians suspected of inciting riots. A minority of Israeli society opposed the crackdown, including the Peace Now movement and the far-left Maki party.

Israeli soldiers deployed into the occupied territories during the unrest frequently reported difficulties with the nature of their duties. Thomas L. Friedman of The New York Times interviewed several soldiers in early January 1988, wrote that: "despite their often being embroiled in violent clashes with the Palestinians, the soldiers do not view themselves as occupiers. They view themselves essentially as police officers trying to preserve order against a few Palestinian agitators who want to stir up a population that is basically ready to live with the status quo. 'Imagine,' Corporal Radai said, 'if you took a group of American soldiers trained to fight Communists, with all of the instincts that go with that, and then suddenly you plunked them down at the New York police station in the Bronx and told them to do another job. That is the situation here.'" A mid-January 1988 report from Time Magazine described: "Tempers flare and subside along the Israeli-occupied West Bank, but life is not getting any easier for the Nahal soldiers. The unit was dispatched last month to patrol the city of Nablus and its outskirts. The soldiers have been instructed to keep main roads open to traffic and to disperse small threatening crowds on the spot. If the group is large, they are under orders to call in a high-ranking officer. Their commander, Lieut. Colonel Yisrael, detests this assignment. “It’s against everything we teach them,” he says. “We train them to use their guns when they are attacked. Here it’s forbidden.” Here the aggressor, more often than not, is a woman, child or student."

The unrest was met with widespread sympathy by Arab citizens of Israel. On 21 December, the vast majority of Arab citizens of Israel participated in a one-day general strike in support of Palestinians inside the occupied territories, declaring a Day of Peace. Syrian Druze in the Israeli-occupied Golan Heights also participated in the general strike. Israeli journalist Ze'ev Schiff wrote that "this is the first time that the Israeli public has actually seen there is some kind of mutuality between events in the territories and what takes place among Israeli Arabs."

=== Internationally ===
The Israeli responses to the unrest was widely covered by international news media, sparking international outrage. According to Aryeh Shalev of the Jaffee Center for Strategic Studies, "not even the most brilliant public relations campaign could have nullified or even moderated the powerful message generated worldwide by television images of the disturbances, and primarily violent behavior by IDF soldiers against stone-throwing youths and against women and children. The result was to drive home the point that the IDF was an occupation army facing a civilian population fighting for its political right of self-determination." The Israeli government criticised international media coverage of the unrest, with government spokesperson Avi Pazner claiming that "only those things that give Israel a negative image have been screened," and Minister Without Portfolio Moshe Arens saying that "The television cameras naturally seek the most dramatic scenes and not pictures of the Foreign Ministry. One cannot see on television that the soldiers would be in great danger if they did not defend themselves" and that the media was finding "perverse pleasure that Jews are having such troubles, that they are cast in the role of oppressors."

White House Press Secretary Marlin Fitzwater warned that "demonstrations and riots on one side and harsh security measures and the excessive use of live ammunition on the other cannot substitute for genuine dialogue." American senator John Chafee was attacked by stone-throwing Palestinian youth while undertaking a visit to the Qalandia Camp in early January 1988. An early January 1988 opinion poll for Time Magazine found that 50% of Americans thought that the Israeli government was using excessive force against the unrest, while 23% thought that the Israeli government was using an appropriate amount of force.

Egyptian journalist Mohamed Sid-Ahmed argued in late December 1987 that, until the outbreak of the Intifada, the Arab League had mainly been focusing on the Iran-Iraq war and the threat posed to them by Iran, but that "the Palestinian factor has inserted something new and unexpected for everybody. It has shown the Arabs that you cannot afford to have simply one pre-occupation, with Iran." Egyptian Minister of Foreign Affairs Boutros Boutros-Ghali condemned "Israel's persistence in its repressive practices against the Arab inhabitants of the West Bank and Gaza, which constitute a flagrant violation of human rights of the Palestinians," although the Egyptian government did not take any steps beyond expressions of concern. King Hussein of Jordan stated that the riots were a "natural and real response" of Palestinians towards their situation, although the Jordanian government expressed internal concerns that the unrest might spread to Jordan, which had a significant population of Palestinian refugees and bordered the West Bank.

In mid-December, the European Parliament voted 155 to 15 calling for the Israeli government to ensure the Geneva Conventions were respected, and to agree to an international peace conference. In early January 1988, British Minister of State for Foreign Affairs David Mellor, visited the Jabalia refugee camp and declared that "I defy anyone to come here and not be shocked... as long as this place exists in the form it does, it will be a condemnation of a country founded on a very strong moral force. To write off the disturbances here as just organised externally, or by just a few people in the P.L.0., is to totally underestimate the misery of the lives of the people that one sees here." The comments sparked controversy, with Israeli chargé d'affaires in the UK Moshe Raviv warning that "the danger of unbalanced descriptions is that they encourage extremism and aggravate the situation."

On 20 December 1987, Pope John Paul II gave a speech in St. Peter's Square where he stated that "The coming feast of the holy birth deepens our attachment to the land where Jesus was born. That land cannot continue to be a theater of violence, opposition and injustice, with suffering for those populations to which I feel particularly close." Several days later, he appointed Palestinian Michel Sabbah as the Latin Patriarchate of Jerusalem, making Sabbah the first Palestinian to hold the office, which was seen by some as a gesture of support for Palestinians during the ongoing unrest.

On 17 December 1987, Amnesty International expressed concerns that the Israeli response to the unrest was going "well beyond what might be considered reasonable force," citing reports of "Israeli soldiers severely and often indiscriminately beating demonstrators with clubs and rifle butts."

=== United Nations ===
On 22 December 1987, the United Nations Security Council voted in favour of United Nations Security Council Resolution 605 calling for "the exercise of the maximum restraint" in response to the unrest and re-affirming that the Geneva Conventions applied to the occupied Palestinian territories. Fourteen out of the fifteen Security Council members voted in favour of the resolution, and the United States abstained.

On 5 January 1988, the Security Council unanimously and without abstentions adopted United Nations Security Council Resolution 607, condemning the recently announced deportations. The resolution marked the first time since 1981 (when the Israeli government moved to annex the Syrian Golan Heights) that the United States had voted in favour of a UNSC resolution criticising the Israeli government.

Under-Secretary-General of the United Nations Marrack Goulding arrived in Israel on 8 January 1988 on a fact-finding mission. Goulding's visit would spark controversy due to tensions between him and Israeli officials.

== Assessments ==
=== Contemporary assessments ===
Rashad al-Shawwa, a Palestinian moderate and former Mayor of Gaza City until being dismissed by the Israeli government in 1982, stated that "the street is taking over because the people see no alternative to put an end to occupation. In this respect we’re all one file–right and left, religious and non-religious, extremists and the so-called moderates." Palestinian-American scholar Edward Said wrote that "Palestinians recognize that Israel has no real military option against them and that what they have achieved and are not ever going to lose is their survival as a national community." Palestinian journalist Ibrahim Karaeen wrote that "If this continues, in a few years there will be no dialogue at all. We, the fathers, are all asking ourselves, 'How will our children judge us - as cowards, as nationalists, as realists,'" while predicting that "To talk politics, you need politicians, but they have not left any. When they arrested all these people last week, they said they were just arresting the 'organizers.' One thousand organizers? In 10 years they will just have to put a wall up around the whole West Bank and Gaza Strip to arrest all of the organizers."

Haidar Abdel-Shafi, director of the Palestine Red Crescent Society, warned that the unrest was "an indication of how serious the situation is and how it can threaten peace in the region."

Israeli journalist Yoel Marcus described the unrest in January 1988 as "One morning a person wakes up and finds out that he is out of punishments. This could happen in any household when a parent finds out that his severe punishments have stopped working and his children are no longer afraid of him. This is a moment of terrible crisis for the parent, when he discovers he has lost his authority." Israeli journalist Ilan Kfir of Hadashot predicted in December 1987 that "If the political process is ever renewed, the rules of the game will be different. The P.L.O. and leaders of the uprising in the territories - new names on the political map - will determine who will be the representatives to negotiations. It is doubtful whether a political consensus will be created in Israel in favor of negotiating with them."

=== Historical assessments ===
The First Intifada is widely agreed by historians and analysts to have started spontaneously, without any initial central leadership or any involvement of the PLO. Anne Marie Baylouny of the Naval Postgraduate School wrote in 2010 that "this was not the first time the population protested, but this time the protest did not end. The first intifada saw popular organizing reach a new stage by continuing daily and encompassing all areas of the territories simultaneously. Previous popular demonstrations had been episodic, but this one was continuous."

Many historians and analysts have also agreed that the Israeli government was unprepared for the outbreak of the Intifada. According to Ido Zelkovitz of the Max Stern Yezreel Valley College in 2017, "the fact that the Israeli government was not ready for this popular resistance gave Palestinians an early advantage and helped Palestinians create this alternative local leadership while challenging the old guard of the PLO and Fatah." Swedish journalist Nathan Shachar argued in 2010 that the Israeli government's failure to "see the riots for what they were – a spontaneous and genuine popular revolt against the occupation – gave the Gazans several valuable weeks... The Israelis, accustomed to regarding the maintenance of public order as nothing but a security problem, cranked up the dose of military violence as they usually did when faced with disturbances. But in doing so now, they unwittingly sustained the uprising and promoted its international breakthrough."
