= War of the Shops =

The War of the Shops was the conflict between the Israeli government and Palestinian shopkeepers during the First Intifada, with the Israeli government attempting to break repeated commercial strikes by Palestinian shopkeepers.

== History ==
=== Commercial strikes ===
According to Andrew Rigby of Coventry University: "One of the most important aspects of daily life to which any visitor to the occupied territories during the Intifada had to become accustomed to was the opening hours of the shops and stores. Except on general strike days and special occaisons when shopping hours were lengthened, the stores were only open for three hours each morning... The daily closure of the shops after three hours trading, interspersed with total closure on general strikes days, became a major symbol of the struggle taking place between Palestinians and the Israeli state." According to British journalist Helena Cobban, "of the central forms of resistance used during the intifada was the commercial strike." Palestinian lawyer Raja Shehadeh wrote in his 2019 book Going Home: A Walk Through Fifty Years of Occupation that, during the Intifada, "the 'I' changed to 'we' as the public began to express its collective will to liberate the land from occupation, taking great risks. The shuttered shops became our pride, the forced opening by soldiers a personal insult."

The first sporadic commercial strikes by Palestinian shopkeepers during the First Intifada were held in the first few days of the Intifada's outbreak in December 1987. As the unrest developed into a popular uprising by mid-January 1988, coordinated commercial strikes became widespread throughout the occupied territories. The first significantly coordinated commercial strike began in East Jerusalem in mid-December, in response to controversial Israeli minister Ariel Sharon's purchase of a flat in the Muslim Quarter of the Old City of Jerusalem. On 1 January 1988, another significantly coordinated commercial strike broke out in Nablus, with the city's shopkeepers declaring a two-week strike in protest over Israeli efforts to force their shops open.

At the end of January 1988, the newly-formed Unified National Leadership of the Uprising (UNLU) issue a directive allowing shops to open for three designated hours a day during commercial strikes (but not at all during general strikes) in order to alleviate the financial pressure on the shopkeepers and to allow Palestinians to shop for necessities. The UNLU would also issue a directive exempting pharmacies from the commercial strikes, due to their services being deemed essential.

Palestinian shopkeepers would also play a significant role in the implementation of other main UNLU tactics during the early stages of the Intifada, especially the boycott of Israeli-produced goods and the refusal to pay taxes to the Israeli Civil Administration.

=== Motivations ===
According to Aryeh Shalev of the Jaffee Center for Strategic Studies, commercial strikes during the First Intifada were closely linked to the boycott of Israeli-produced goods and "had a dual purpose: to undermine and weaken the Israeli economy and, concomitantly, to strengthen and develop productive sectors in the Territories — economic staying power and manufacturing — while reducing the Territories’ economic dependence on Israel."

According to F. Robert Hunter of Tulane University, "the Palestinians who launched these strikes were an important part of the middle class. Retailers, mostly, this petit-bourgeoisie may have had less formal education than the urban professionals, but because of their place in the local and regional economy they possessed great collective influence. These men had wide-ranging contacts with wholesalers, exporters and importers and other suppliers, and with the general public. Having borne the brunt of Israel's imposition of the value-added tax, they resented having had to finance a large proportion of the military administration's budget." One restaurant owner in Ramallah interviewed by Mouin Rabbani in the spring of 1990 stated that "while the surprise shown by many outsiders for the leading role played by small businessmen in the uprising is perhaps understandable, to me their participation is the most natural thing. Their lives had reached a dead end. They were sick of the occupation, its taxes, the constant fear it created, the way it was robbing their children of a future. At the same time, the occupation was bringing in drugs, alcoholism, disreputable women - things that the Israelis call freedom but to the Palestinians meant that they were completely losing control of their own society. The uprising began because people were conscious, realizing that they had been made strangers in their own land."

A minority of Palestinian shopkeepers opposed the commercial strikes, and were frequently forced to participate after threats from local organisers and youth. Several cases of arson were reported against shopkeepers who refused to participate.

=== Israeli efforts to break the commercial strikes ===
According to the Jerusalem Media and Communication Centre, "shutting shop, a non-violent form of economic protest, had previously elicited punishments of fines and arrest from the Israeli authorities; during the uprising, however, the extent of Israeli measures implemented against the striking shopkeepers became as unprecedented as the scale of the commercial protest." According to Aryeh Shalev of the Jaffee Center for Strategic Studies, "while commercial strikes have been used as acts of defiance toward the Israeli authorities since 1967, never before have they become a continuous and virtually permanent tool, against which the military has proved ineffective."

To try and disrupt commercial strikes, the Israeli military frequently attempted to force Palestinian shopkeepers to open their shops, particularly by breaking the locks on shop doors. Israeli soldiers would also confiscate shop keys from shopkeepers to prevent them from locking their shops and vital documents to try and pressure shopkeepers to end their strikes. At other times, the Israeli military attempted to force Palestinian shops to close during the morning opening hours. Louis Toscano of United Press International reported on one effort in mid-March 1988: "In Hebron, 20 miles south of Jerusalem, soldiers fanned out through the downtown area, telling shopkeepers to close immediately. Troops in jeeps cruised the streets, blaring the order over loudspeakers. 'Shut it now or we will shut it for you,' an officer warned an elderly grocer who quickly began drawing down steel shutters over his storefront. In front of a bakery, one soldier jabbed a clerk with a wooden club in an attempt to make him move faster. The army informed shopkeepers they were free to reopen at noon. But only a handful of stores were open at 12:30 p.m. and few customers were on the streets. 'I don't know what to do,' complained one merchant as he stood outside his shuttered business. 'We are not supposed to be open in the afternoon. But we were not to be closed in the morning.'"

In late April 1988, the Israeli military carried out a high-profile arrest of fourteen East Jerusalem shopkeepers for their participation in commercial strikes. Israeli general Amram Mitzna had issued a directive under the Defence (Emergency) Regulations ordering open 25 Palestinian shops facing the Damascus Gate. Dan Fisher of The Los Angeles Times reported: "More than 100 police, soldiers and plainclothes security men descended on a row of shops along the Street of the Prophets minutes after merchants opened them at 2 p.m. in accordance with instructions from the underground leadership of the Palestinian uprising that has rocked the country since early December. Police ordered would-be shoppers and spectators away, detained some merchants and ordered the rest to lock their businesses back up. By keeping their stores shuttered for all but three hours daily, the merchants have provided a highly visible reminder in the capital of the continuing Palestinian unrest, which the army now says has cost 165 Arab lives in the occupied West Bank and Gaza Strip. Jerusalem is on the itinerary of most of the more than 100,000 tourists who visit Israel in an average month. The authorities want the merchants to remain open all day to return a look of normalcy to the city. And Monday’s message was that if the merchants refuse to go along, the security forces will make sure they cannot open at all. 'The logic is that the intifada doesn’t determine what happens,' according to a senior police official quoted in Monday’s editions of The Jerusalem Post. 'We do.'"

Palestinian communities took a number of measures to circumvent the Israeli attempts to crack down on commercial strikes. The popular committees frequently organised watch rotations to guard shops whose locks had been broken by soldiers, and very few incidents of looting occurred. Locksmiths and metalworkers' unions volunteered to repair locks free of charge. At the urgning of the UNLU, some landlords agreed not to charge shopkeepers rent.

Some Palestinians accused the Israeli military of human rights violations in the military's efforts to prevent unrest. At a 2 February 1988 press conference at the National Palace Hotel in East Jerusalem, a joint committee of Ramallah and Al-Bireh merchants accused the Israeli military of damaging at least two hundred shops in the two cities since the outbreak of the Intifada, some of them more than once, and of looting some of the shops.

By mid-February 1988, some Israeli sources began indicating that they were losing their conflict with the Palestinian shopkeepers. The War of the Shops would reach its climax in early May 1988. After a Palestine-wide general strike on 4 May, the Israeli military ordered all Palestinian shops shut for three days. Following unsuccessful attempts to enforce the order, the Israeli military would largely abandon widescale efforts to break commercial strikes throughout the rest of the Intifada.

=== Decline ===
As the momentum of the First Intifada began to stall in 1989, commercial strikes would at first remain widespread despite the onset of the disappearance of the Palestinian popular committees. In later stages of the Intifada, however, the use of commercial strikes would decline significantly, as the economic crisis caused by the Intifada worsened, the UNLU increasingly lost its cohesion, and the upsurgent Islamist group Hamas emerged as a major Palestinian faction. In its Communiqué No. 69, issued in April 1991, the UNLU issued a directive allowing shops to open for a full day three times every two weeks.

Commercial strikes would cease to be a feature of the Intifada in March 1992, after a conflict over the strikes between what remained of the UNLU and Hamas. After Hamas called for commercial strikes to be relaxed for Ramadan, the UNLU attempted to order commercial strikes as usual, but faced a widespread backlash from shopkeepers, culminating in an overwhelming victory for Hamas in the Ramallah Chamber of Commerce elections. The UNLU would subsequently significantly limit its calls for commercial strikes and general strikes in the future, and would also relax its calls for boycotts of Israeli-produced goods. According to Ehud Yaari of The Jerusalem Report, by May 1992, the attitude of most Palestinians towards the strikes called by the UNLU had become "sick of their frequency. To Palestinians, the strike is less a weapon against Israel than a means of self-flagellation," while noting that "The Palestinian 'street' sees the Islamic movement — which manages to combine fiery anti-Israel rhetoric with a cautious, restrained approach in its day-to-day Intifada activity — as being more attuned to its problems. Hamas, and its extended periphery of Muslim Brotherhood supporters, hit exactly on the public mood, both on the principle of no negotiations on autonomy (though they’ve taken no practical steps to stop them) and also in its readiness to reduce the burden the Intifada imposes on the populace."

== See also ==
- Cooperatives in the First Intifada
