= Palestinian Gandhi =

The term "Palestinian Gandhi" has been used in debates concerning the Israeli–Palestinian conflict, most often to allege that Palestinians opposing the Israeli occupation of the Palestinian Territories have eschewed the use of nonviolent resistance and that the Palestinian cause would have greater success if they practiced nonviolent resistance, similar to the movement led by Indian nationalist Mahatma Gandhi against the British Empire.

== Debates ==
=== Calls for a Palestinian Gandhi ===
Some commentators have argued that the Palestinian liberation movement has historically failed because Palestinian activists have refused to use non-violent means to protest against the Israeli occupation of the Palestinian Territories, and that the movement will continue to fail in the future until a Palestinian figure like Mahatma Gandhi emerges. Palestinian-American writer Ramzy Baroud has stated that the term is "inescapable, especially for people who classify themselves as 'pro-Palestinian activists'." Astha Chadha of Ritsumeikan University has argued that "the spectres of Gandhi have been invoked by leaders on all sides of the Israel–Palestine conflict, often with interpretations that serve a particular political narrative."

Noah Feldman of Harvard University argued in 2017 that it would be "almost impossible for any Israeli government to use force in a continuous or repeated way to suppress Gandhian protests", saying that "to change the attitudes of Israelis and Americans, and hence change Israel's actions, Palestinians need to do something radically different." In 2007, William W. Finan Jr. of Current History speculated that the emergence of a "Palestinian Gandhi or Mandela" might shift the American media's focus "from suicide bombers and Hamas militants to Palestinian innocents and the despair and poverty of the occupied territories. The Israel lobby, like the Taiwan lobby, would still exist – but it would have less of the moral force and political traction that have made it appear so powerful."

Kenneth M. Pollack of the Brookings Institution claimed in 2011 that "If they'd been led by Gandhi rather than Yasser Arafat, they would have had a state 20 years ago." Adam Kirsch has written that "especially during the years of Yasser Arafat's leadership of the PLO, this was a way of criticizing the Palestinian leadership for its rejectionism and commitment to violence, which so obviously failed to advance the Palestinian cause... the longing for a Palestinian Gandhi is an expression of the Jewish desire to be enabled to make peace by being morally compelled to make peace. Gandhi, after all, did finally succeed in driving the British out of India, and his Palestinian equivalent would presumably succeed in making Israel withdraw from the West Bank. The key to this dream, however, is that such a Palestinian leader would be so trustworthy, so committed to peace and nonviolence, that an Israeli withdrawal would not invite future aggression."

Some commentators have linked to liberal politics. Victoria Mason of the Australian National University and Richard A. Falk of Princeton University have written that calls for a "Palestinian Gandhi" have "been a common sentiment expressed by leading international figures such as US president Barack Obama (2009). This is part of a wider liberal argument that failures to establish sustainable peace between Israel and the Palestinians is primarily the result of Palestinian militancy, and if the Palestinians embraced nonviolence they would gain the support of the international community – including the US – as well as find a resonant response within Israel itself." Mehdi Hasan of The New Statesman has written that "the question is often posed by frustrated liberals, sympathetic to the Palestinian struggle for independence but repulsed by its attendant use of terror. The argument runs as follows: the Palestinians' armed struggle, in the form of suicide attacks inside Israeli cities and rocket attacks on Israeli border towns, has catastrophically failed. They find themselves isolated internationally and penned in domestically, between a network of Israeli fences and roadblocks." James Brownsell of The New Arab has written that: "So many times have I heard the following argument from Western "leftist intellectuals": "The problem with Palestinians is that they're violent. They want to take back the land they perceive to be theirs by killing Israelis and driving them into the sea. What they need is a leader willing to embrace the spirit of non-violence, like Gandhi, to lead them in their thousands, unarmed, to the checkpoints. The army couldn't shoot them all, and they would win."

Journalist Amira Hass has written that scepticism of calls for a Palestinian Gandhi is often based on factors such as the fact that the Palestine Authority officially praises them while also remaining distant from them, because they are seen as a way to appease European donors, because Israeli anti-occupation activists are often involved, and because "the fact that those involved in the "non-violent struggle" are detained, arrested and injured, that they choke on tear gas and regularly risk their lives, still does not give them the aura and fame accorded those who had taken up weapons."

=== Definition of non-violence ===
Nicholas Kristof of The New York Times wrote in 2010 that the "biggest challenge" to a Palestinian Gandhi was that "many Palestinians define 'nonviolence' to include stone-throwing", saying that Palestinians should instead focus on methods like sit-down protests to block access to Israeli settlements, boycotts of Israeli products, and publicly marching into military no-go security zones. Responding to Kristof's article, Jonathan Mark of the Jewish Telegraphic Agency argued that, even when Palestinians carried out violent acts, "journalists could always find someone to say that the Palestinians were really non-violent," asking "at what point, between Ashrawi and the 2002 Jerusalem Report headline, "Seeking a Palestinian Mahatma Gandhi" and the Kristof headline, "Waiting for Gandhi (July 9)," a time that saw more than 2,000 Palestinian rockets, more than 5,000 dead and wounded Israelis, and the electoral victory in Gaza by Hamas, does it become time to drop the promotion of Gandhi as the next Palestinian leader?"

Victoria Mason of the Australian National University and Richard A. Falk of Princeton University have written that a "major factor complicating the recognition of Palestinian nonviolence is one of translation. The English-language term "nonviolence" (la ‘unf) does not translate positively into Arabic – implying passivity and weakness. Actions generally understood by the West to encompass "nonviolence" are instead described by Palestinians as "civil resistance", "political defiance" or "popular resistance." Yet many in the West interpret any political behaviour described as "resistance" as implying violence, thus misunderstanding the Palestinian meaning of "popular resistance."

Max Fisher of Vox has stated that "a common variation of [the 'Palestinian Gandhi'] argument is to acknowledge that some Palestinians are nonviolent but point out that other Palestinians are violent, and conclude that Palestinian nonviolence won't be effective until all Palestinians adopt it", arguing that the Indian independence movement did include some violent resistance to British rule and that the Palestinian Authority's compromise with the Israeli government since 1993 has not lessened the occupation in the West Bank.

Chadha has argued that Israeli figures who have invoked Gandhi have mainly invoked him "not as a powerful, transformative tool but as a method of peaceful submission and a means to fill jails, thereby removing the confrontational and disruptive elements of Gandhi's Satyagraha. This approach, often advocated by figures outside the mainstream Israeli government, places the entire moral and political burden of the conflict on the Palestinians. They are exhorted to adopt non-violence to gain international sympathy and to prove their peaceful intentions, with the underlying assumption that their use of violence is the sole impediment to a just resolution. This narrative, while ostensibly a tribute to Gandhi, selectively ignores the fact that Gandhi's Satyagraha was fundamentally a struggle against an occupying power, not a call for submission to it.

=== Historical use of non-violence by Palestinians ===
Other commentators have argued that non-violent tactics have been used by Palestinians and pro-Palestinian activists, but have been suppressed. Nicholas Casey of The New York Times wrote in 2024 that non-violent actions in the Occupied Palestinian Territories are "notably challenging", as the Israeli military "has forbidden nearly every form of protest, even things as small as gathering more than 10 people for a political conversation or simply waving the Palestinian flag. The simplest acts of defiance can be seen as a threat."

Benay Blend of The Palestine Chronicle wrote in 2019 that "rather than asking why there is no such Palestinian leader, it might be more instructive to ask when will Israel stop assassinating, disabling and imprisoning potential Gandhis", pointing towards Palestinian actions such as the Great March of Return, largely peaceful demonstrations that saw thousands of protestors injured by Israeli forces, and the non-violent protests in Bil'in against the West Bank barrier, which saw the Israeli military destroying the cameras of Palestinians who tried to film the military's repression of the protests. Palestinian liberation theology leader Naim Ateek has argued that "there are people today in Israeli prisons, like Marwan Barghouti, one of the main leaders of the Second Intifada - who was jailed in 2002 – who could have played a role in the peace process. Israel is looking for someone who will adopt their methods and if they don’t accept, they will be assassinated or sidelined."

Victoria Mason of the Australian National University and Richard A. Falk of Princeton University have argued that "the international community has, for the most part, failed to acknowledge and support Palestinian nonviolence" and that, "comparison with the focus on Palestinian violence, the equally significant history of Palestinian nonviolent resistance is virtually unknown." Mason and Falk pointed to examples such as the Arab general strike of 1936, which was met with a British crackdown, the early stages of the First Intifada in the late 1980s, which Israeli Minister of Defence Yitzhak Rabin ordered suppressed with "force, might, and beatings," and the Palestinian cultural value of sumud. Manal A. Jamal of James Madison University has pointed towards the National Guidance Committee, set up after the 1976 West Bank local elections and banned by the Israeli government in 1982, as well as the deportation of Mubarak Awad, a prominent Palestinian advocated of non-violence, in 1988 on charges of inciting unrest.

=== Palestinian Mandela ===
Some commentators have argued that a Palestinian equivalent to South African anti-apartheid activist and co-founder of the uMkhonto weSizwe paramilitary Nelson Mandela is required instead of a Palestinian equivalent to Gandhi. Christopher Hitchens pointed to calls for a Palestinian Mandela by Palestinian scholar Edward Said and argued that it would be "a better direction than Gandhi... the ANC wasn’t pacifist in name or in fact, despite the Mahatma’s early input."

=== Israeli figures and society ===
Some commentators have used the term to question Israeli figures. Sharif Elmusa of the American University in Cairo has argued that resolution of the Israeli–Palestinian conflict requires the emergence of an Israel Charles de Gaulle instead of a Palestinian Gandhi, referring to the former French president's decision to end the French military campaign in the Algerian War, claiming that "enduring Israeli-Palestinian encounter of war-resistance could be brought to an end through arrangements parallel to those of Algeria/France, with West Bank settlers relocating to Israel." Paul R. Pillar of The National Interest wrote in 2010 that "there has been no Israeli equivalent of Mohandas Gandhi", saying that the State of Israel was founded via a violent campaign against British rule in the 1940s and that Gandhi refused to characterise India as a Hindu state, unlike the State of Israel, which has often been characterised as a Jewish state.

Israeli scholar Ran HaCohen wrote in 2005 that the term was mostly only used in international media and not within Israeli society, claiming that within Israel there is "militarism as the state religion." During the 2011–2012 Palestinian protests, an Israeli military cable discussing plans to suppress the protests leaked by WikiLeaks quoted Israeli Major General Amos Gilad as saying that "we don't do Gandhi very well."

Chadha has argued that Palestinian figures have mainly invoked Gandhi as "a model to be followed in some measure by the oppressed but mainly by the occupier ... to argue that Jews, as a foreign imposition, should remain in the region only through the "goodwill of the Arabs," promoting peace and refraining from claiming land by force."

== People referred to as a "Palestinian Gandhi" ==
People referred to as a "Palestinian Gandhi"
Name	Summary	References
Abdallah Abu Rahmah	Secondary school teacher and coordinator in the Bil'in Popular Committee against the Wall movement organising non-violent protests against the West Bank barrier. Imprisoned by Israeli authorities on multiple occasions.	
Issa Amro	Co-founder of non-violent activism group Youth Against Settlements. Arrested by Israeli and Palestine Authority security services multiple on multiple occasions.	
Ghassan Andoni	Physicist and co-founder of the International Solidarity Movement and the Palestinian Center for Rapprochement between Peoples.	
Nafez Assaily	Palestinian sociologist and peace activist	
Mubarak Awad	Psychologist and founder of the Palestinian Centre for the Study of Nonviolence. Arrested and deported by Israeli authorities in 1988, after launching a Palestine-wide civil disobedience campaign during the First Intifada.	
Ali Abu Awwad	Former Fatah militant turned peace activist.	
Mahmoud Abu Rahma	International director of the Al Mezan Center for Human Rights.	
Daoud Nassar	Farmer and head of the Tent of Nations.	
Sari Nusseibeh	Philosopher involved in non-violent activism, including the Amirav-Husseini peace meetings and the launching of a Palestine-wide civil disobedience campaign during the First Intifada.	
Mazin Qumsiyeh	Biologist, co-founder of the Palestine Museum of Natural History, and activist.	
Mitri Raheb	Priest and co-author of the Kairos Palestine Document.	
Eyad al-Sarraj	Pyschiatrist, critic of the Palestine Authority, and peace activist.	
Bassem Tamimi	Leader of demonstrations against Israeli settlement in Nabi Salih.	
