= Communiqués of the Unified National Leadership of the Uprising =

Documents issued during the First Intifada

During the First Intifada, the Palestinian Unified National Leadership of the Uprising (UNLU) distributed regular communiqués directing the activities of the uprising and setting out its political stances. According to Thayer Hastings of the CUNY Graduate Center, the UNLU communiqués were "key political texts of the Intifada era." Israeli historian Ilan Pappé has described the communiqués as "both as a newspaper and a manual for the intifada."

== Background ==
On 9 December 1987, an Israeli truck driver collided with and killed four Palestinians in the Jabalia refugee camp. The incident sparked the largest wave of Palestinian unrest since the Israeli occupation began in 1967: the First Intifada. During the early stages, the Intifada was largely characterised by a non-violent campaign, with actions including labour strikes, tax strikes, boycotts of Israeli goods, boycotts of Israeli institutions, demonstrations, the establishment of underground classrooms and cooperatives, raisings of the banned Palestinian flag, and civil disobedience. The actions were led by a decentralised leadership composed of the grassroots organisations of the PLO, such as labour unions, student councils, and women's committees, who organised themselves into the Unified National Leadership of the Uprising (UNLU), mainly outside of the direct control of the PLO leadership, who were mostly in exile or imprisoned (or had been killed by Israeli forces over the preceding years).

The Israeli government responded to the breakout of the Intifada with a harsh crackdown, however, with Minister of Defence Yitzhak Rabin pledging to suppress it using "force, might, and beatings," including ordering Israeli soldiers to break the bones of Palestinian protestors, imposing widespread lockdowns on Palestinian cities, mass arrests, and demolitions of Palestinian houses. During the later stages of the Intifada, as the Israeli crackdown severely damaged the Palestinian economy and morale, and as the PLO leadership in exile attempted to take on greater day-to-day control over the Intifada, the UNLU began to lose control over the uprising and the uprising grew more violent during its last stages, including Palestinian internal political violence against rumoured collaborators. By the end of the Intifada, over a thousand Palestinians had been killed and over a hundred thousand injured by Israeli forces, with around two hundred Israelis having been killed by Palestinians. The First Intifada would come to an end with several high-profile peace negotiations, including the Madrid Conference of 1991 and the 1993 Oslo Accords.

== Overview ==
The Unified National Leadership of the Uprising (UNLU) was a collective of Palestinian local leaders during the First Intifada. Emerging from the grassroots civilian associations that had proliferated in Palestine in the 1980s and the local branches of Palestinian Liberation Organisation groups, the UNLU operated clandestinely and played the leading role in directing the Intifada. Its major activity was to issue leaflets containing communiqués describing the actions Palestinians should take to support the Intifada in the following two weeks. The communiqués focused on tactics of civil disobedience and nonviolent resistance, particularly via strike action and boycotts.

The leaflets were printed in a decentralised manner, including sometimes in the homes of UNLU activists, and distributed by UNLU activists and local youth. According to Ziad Abu-Amr of Birzeit University, "representatives of the groups [comprising the UNLU] would generally discuss the substance of the leaflets. Then, for practical reasons, one group at a time would take the responsibility to draft and print them. This gave the group in charge a certain amount of freedom to make minor alterations, bringing the text more in line with its ideological and political persuasion," which sometimes caused disagreement among the UNLU factions, but substantial differences of opinion mostly led to the individual factions releasing their own, separate communiqués in conjunction with the UNLU communiqués.

According to Lee O'Brien and Penny Johnson of the Middle East Research and Information Project, writing in Spring 1988:

In the occupied West Bank these days, people walk around with their eyes lowered to the ground. This posture is not to avoid the attention of the incessant military patrols, or to avert one’s eyes from witnessing their physical violence and harassment which are, still somehow shockingly, often carried out in full view. (A street scene, February 12, in Ramallah: After a small demonstration, soldiers detain a young man, cover his head with a makeshift hood and beat him. One red-haired soldier, with a fresh face and wire-rimmed glasses like a bright college student, repeatedly returns to kick the prisoner. Soldiers shout at people staring silently from the windows of their houses: “Go away.” If the watchers do not vanish quickly, soldiers hurl stones at the windows.) Neither do the downcast eyes indicate a population weary after 12 weeks of an uprising that has left over 100 dead, many hundreds injured, and thousands detained. The collective mood is almost electrifyingly high. Rather, people look down to spot the latest statement from the United Leadership Committee for the Uprising, often found in the streets or tucked under a windshield or door. For the first time in many years, words have a direct bearing on individual and collective action. People shape their daily lives around the announcements of general strikes, demonstrations from churches and mosques, and “assignments” to different sectors of the population. In mid-February, people rejoiced as “Statement Number Seven” came out on schedule, despite an army raid on an ‘Isawiyya print shop suspected of producing the statements.

In response to the UNLU's use of leaflets, the Israeli government hightened censorship in the Palestinian Territories, including arresting Palestinians caught carrying the leaflets. The Israeli military further ordered all printing presses in the Gaza Strip to register with the military and obtain approval to continue operations.

== Communiqués ==
=== Communiqués No. 1 - No. 10 ===
- The first communiqué of the UNLU was released on 8 January 1988, nearly one month after the start of the First Intifada. The communiqué called for a three-day general strike across Palestine from 11 to 13 January, a call that was widely followed. According to Jamal Zakout, a DFLP activist and member of the UNLU, the communiqué "included six demands, on land confiscation, the evacuation of military forces from residential areas, an end to harassment at universities, an end to interference in the trade union movement and the arrests of trade unionists, and the abolition of taxes."
- Communiqué No. 2 contained a list of political demands, including an end to the Israeli Iron Fist policy, for Ariel Sharon to be evicted from his recently purchased flat in the Old City of Jerusalem, the withdrawal of Israeli forces from Palestinian cities, the dissolution of municipal councils appointed by the Israeli Civil Administration to replace the elected councils, and closure of several prisons with a notorious reputation among Palestinians.
- Communiqué No. 3 was issued on 18 January 1988. In the communiqué, the UNLU clarified that it was affiliated with the PLO and called for Palestinian merchants to refused to pay taxes to the Israeli Civil Administration.
- In Communiqué No. 4, the UNLU stated its opposition to the Jordanian Option for resolving the status of the occupied territories, calling instead for the establishment of an independent Palestinian state. The communiqué also called for greater economic self-reliance for Palestine and for Palestinians to establish and join popular committees.
- In Communiqué No. 5, the UNLU called for religious Palestinians, the "masses of the mosque and the church," to unite in support of the uprising and for merchants to burn their Israeli tax records. The communiqué also warned against the black market and merchants who would wish to take advantage of the uprising to price gouge, as well as warned against Jordanian attempts to influence the uprising.
- Communiqué No. 6 called for Israeli-appointed local authorities to resign. It also denounced "American imperialism" and denounced attempts to create "an alternative leadership to our sole legitimate leadership, the PLO."
- Communiqué No. 8 was issued on 18 February 1988, and called for a boycott of Israeli goods and for Palestinians to promote the Palestinian local economy instead. Communiqués No. 9 and No. 10 elaborated on the same theme, including issuing a list of specific Israeli products to boycott. Communiqué No. 9 also called for Palestinian professionals to refuse to pay taxes to the Israeli Civil Administration, for Palestinian factories to work at full capacity to replace Israeli products, for Palestinian health services to stay open, for women to hold women's demonstrations in support of the Intifada, and for teachers and students to defy Israeli orders shutting down Palestinian schools and break into their schools and hold lessons.

=== Communiqués No. 11 - No. 19 ===
- Communiqué No. 15 was issued on 29 April 1988. The communiqué called for mayors of Palestinian cities appointed by the Israeli Civil Administration as well as for Palestinian police officers to resign, additionally calling for students at Palestinian universities to attend classes in defiance of Israeli orders for Palestinian universities to shut down, and for a two-day general strike on 9 and 10 May to mark the first six months of the Intifada.
- Communiqué No. 18 was issued in late May 1988, containing a list of demands to end the Intifada. The demands included the withdrawal of Israeli troops from populated areas of Palestine, releasing Palestinians detained by Israel, allowing Palestinians who had been deported by Israel to return, cancelling any new military orders issued as a result of the Intifada, allowing Palestinians to hold democratic elections, removing restrictions on Palestinian economic development, and the establishment of a body of international observers to protect Palestinians as they built an independent state. According to Joel Brinkley of The New York Times, "Palestinians familiar with the leaflet's intentions said the purpose was to give the Israeli Labor Party a possible program for ending the uprising. The idea was also to give Secretary of State George P. Shultz, who is to visit the region next month, a Palestinian position that he could advocate."

=== Communiqués No. 20 - No. 29 ===
- Communiqué No. 20, issued on 22 June 1988, titled "The Jerusalem Communiqué," called for the focus of the Intifada to shift to East Jerusalem for the following two weeks, including calling for a general strike on 28 June, the 21st anniversary of the Israeli annexation of East Jerusalem. Israeli Minister of Police Haim Bar-Lev rejected the demands for the return of East Jerusalem to Palestine, saying that "Jerusalem is unified and will remain unified." The communiqué also included several other demands, including the establishment of an international observer force to protect Palestinians and to allow Palestinians to hold municipal elections, that the Israeli government respect the Fourth Geneva Convention, that the Israeli military withdraw from Palestinian cities, that Palestinians imprisoned by Israel be released, and Palestinians deported by Israel be allowed to return. The Israeli government rejected the demands, with a senior Israeli military officer telling The New York Times that "there's nothing to respond to" as the communiqué contained "nothing new."
- Communiqué No. 21 called for a general strike to be held on 18 July 1988, in solidarity with Palestinians detained by Israel in the Ktzi'ot Prison. The general strike was widely observed among Palestinians. The communiqué also called for Palestinians to withdraw their savings from Israeli banks and for Palestinians who promoted Israeli businesses to be sanctioned.
- In Communiqué No. 22, the UNLU called for a boycott of tourism in Israel and called for Palestinians to not pay fines issued by the Israeli government.
- In Communiqué No. 25, released in early September 1988, the UNLU denounced the recently founded Islamist group Hamas, who had just issued its founding charter. In the communiqué, the UNLU accused Hamas of trying to impose itself on Palestinians, further stating that "anyone who disturbs by force the unity of our people is serving the enemy and weakening the uprising." The communiqué also directly referred to PLO leader Yasser Araft for the first time, calling for Palestinians to support the PLO and for the PLO central leadership in Tunisia to formulate a "clear and specific program based on Palestinian nationalist principles."
- In Communiqué No. 27, the UNLU called for the Palestinian National Council to declare an independent Palestinian state.
- Communiqué No. 29 was issued in late November 1988. The communiqué declared the UNLU's support for the Palestinian Declaration of Independence, recently proclaimed by the Palestinian National Council, and criticised Islamist groups for opposing the declaration.

=== Communiqués No. 30 - No. 39 ===
- Communiqué No. 32 called for a general strike on 9 January, a call that was widely followed throughout Palestine. The communiqué also called for unity among Palestinian nationalist groups, specifically calling for Fatah and the newly emerging Hamas to work with each other.
- In Communiqué No. 39, issued in late April 1989, the UNLU accused Arab states of failing to support Palestine and denounced the Jordanian government for its suppression of the 1989 Jordanian protests against corruption and austerity. The communiqué also called for Palestinians to boycott negotiations with the Israeli Civil Administration and for Palestinian Muslims to heed the Supreme Muslim Council's call to attend prayers at Al-Aqsa during Ramadan.

=== Communiqués No. 40 - No. 49 ===
- Communiqué No. 44 was issued on 15 August 1989. It called for solidarity strikes in protest with the Israeli government's recently announced policy requiring all Gazan boys and men over the age of 16 to hold Israeli-issued ID cards.
- Communiqué No. 46 was issued on 28 September 1989. It called for a one-day general strike in support of the Gaza Strip and against the ID card policy.
- Communiqué No. 49 was issued on 4 December 1989. It called for Palestinians in the West Bank to be "prepared to wage the battle of the magnetic cards."

== Analysis ==
According to Ziad Abu-Amr of Birzeit University, the communiqués "did not emanate from an overall clear and planned strategy of which each leaflet was an integral component, but rather dealt with the situation as it unfolded and tried to capitalise on it, guided by the broader national objectives," notably "the right to self-determination and the establishment of an independent Palestinian state under the leadership of the PLO."

The UNLU also prioritised non-violent resistance to Israeli occupation in its communiqués - a study by the Palestinian Centre for the Study of Nonviolence found that 95% of the actions called for in the UNLU's first 17 communiqués were non-violent, and over 90% in the next 22 communiqués, with the calls that were violent limited to less-lethal violence such as stone-throwing.

J. Kristen Urban of Mount St. Mary's University has argued that the communiqués served as a "de facto Constitution for a people in the process of nation-building." According to Urban, the communiqués also reflected the growing subordination of the UNLU to the PLO central leadership in Tunisia over the course of the Intifada, with the first 14 communiqués each containing only one direct reference to the PLO, but with the number of references substantially increasing in later communiqués, and with the content of the later communiqués containing increased appeals to the international community. Urban also notes a substantial shift away from the political left starting with Communiqué No. 41, after which point the communiqués warned Palestinians only to act based on "central decision by the higher command."
