= 1987 Ariel Sharon move to Jerusalem =

In December 1987, Israeli Minister of Industry Ariel Sharon sparked controversy by moving into an apartment in the Muslim Quarter of the Old City of Jerusalem.

== History ==
Ariel Sharon was an Israeli soldier and politician. As a member of the right-wing Likud party, he had served as Minister of Defence between 1981 and 1983 under Prime Minister Menachem Begin. His term as Minister of Defence was marked by controversial policies towards the occupied Palestinian territories, including promoting Israeli settlement and disbanding elected Palestinian city councils, as well as the 1982 Israeli invasion of Lebanon. He resigned as Minister in 1983 after an official enquiry determined that he bore personal responsibility for the Sabra and Shatila massacre of Palestinian refugees in Beirut. He would return to cabinet the next year, being named Minister of Industry, a post he would hold until 1990.

In mid-December 1987, Sharon announced that he would be moving into an apartment on the main street of the Muslim Quarter of the Old City of Jerusalem. The apartment was owned by the Wittenberg Trust, and leased by the Ateret Cohanim movement, which aims to create a Jewish demographic majority in the Old City of Jerusalem and in Palestinian East Jerusalem. To mark the move, and to mark Hanukkah, he would hold a gathering of prominent Israeli figures at the flat, including Prime Minister Yitzhak Shamir. OneFamily Fund founder Marc Belzberg described in a 2024 article in The Jerusalem Post: "It was well known that Sharon was not only a brilliant military general but also a right-wing politician with a vision of a “Greater Israel.” He bought an apartment in the Old City of Jerusalem, where he hung an Israeli flag outside a window, boldly displaying it to those walking along the main street of the Arab Quarter." Thomas L. Friedman of The New York Times described in late December 1987:

About nine months ago Mr. Sharon bought from the Ateret Cohanim Yeshiva, the rights to an apartment in the Muslim quarter that had been owned by Jews for 103 years, but occupied by Arabs since 1948. The apartment had been willed to the Yeshiva, which bought out the Arab family living in it in order to make it available for Mr. Sharon... The building in which the apartment is situated also houses three Arab families, who now have to pass through Mr. Sharon's security to get in and out. They, and some of the shopkeepers on the street below, complained to reporters about constantly being asked to show their identity cards.

The move sparked controversy, with critics warning that it might spark tensions between Israelis and Palestinians in Jerusalem and that it would cause Sharon's security costs, covered by the government, to increase significantly, including the deployment of three hundred police officers to guard his house-warming ceremony. Mayor of Jerusalem Teddy Kollek criticised the move, saying that "I believe from the depths of my heart in our historic right [to Jerusalem]. But another apartment will bring us no glory," and refused his invitation to attend Sharon house-warming ceremony. Academic and Peace Now spokesperson Galia Golan described the move as "like putting a time bomb in there," accusing Sharon of moving to "score political points in his own party."

Members of the Israeli right and far-right, on the other hand, applauded the move. Sharon's Likud party sent him a formal telegram congratulating him on the move, saying that "the dedication of a new home in such a crucial location is the best proof of all that the people of Israel have come to remain in the land for all eternity." Likud leader and Prime Minister Yitzhak Shamir stated that "There’s no provocation in this. Jews have lived here, and Jews will live here." Kach activist Noam Federman declared that "we think that every Jew has a right to live where he wants to. We don't think the Arabs have that right." Sharon defended his move by saying that "My presence in the Old City will decrease the tensions there. If we, my family and I, can contribute a little to security in the area, we will do our part."

The move sparked further controversy because it coincided with the a major wave of Palestinian unrest following a truck accident on 8 December that killed four Palestinian workers. Sharon's move was criticised by some as contributing to the spread of unrest, and to the transformation of that unrest into the popular uprising known as the First Intifada, in East Jerusalem. When the Unified National Leadership of the Uprising (UNLU) coalesced as the leadership coalition directing the Intifada in early January 1988, its second communiqué detailed the uprising's demands for the first time, including demanding Sharon's eviction from the flat.
