= Education during the First Intifada =

During the First Intifada in Palestine, from 1987 to 1991, the Israeli government repeatedly ordered almost all Palestinian schools closed for various lengths of time, including every single Palestinian university. The government justified its orders on the widespread participation of Palestinian youth in demonstrations, saying that schools had become hotspots of unrest and stone throwing. The school closures became a key site of non-violent resistance among Palestinians, with popular committees organising a variety alternative underground classrooms. Those underground classrooms were in turn banned by the Israeli government and targeted by Israeli crackdowns, ultimately causing significant disruption to the education of many Palestinian youth.

Yamila Hussein of the Radical Teacher has argued that "during the 1987 intifada, Palestinian education—formal and informal—effectively became illegal as Israel closed schools and universities indefinitely, and Israeli soldiers harassed and arrested students and teachers for participating in 'underground' classes or even for carrying books." According to Stanley Cohen of the Hebrew University of Jerusalem, "In the academic year 1987–1988, pupils in the West Bank lost some 175 out of 210 school days because of forced closures."

== Background ==
On 9 December 1987, an Israeli truck driver collided with and killed four Palestinians in the Jabalia refugee camp. The incident sparked the largest wave of Palestinian unrest since the Israeli occupation began in 1967: the First Intifada. During the early stages, the Intifada was largely characterised by a non-violent campaign, with actions including labour strikes, tax strikes, boycotts of Israeli goods, boycotts of Israeli institutions, demonstrations, the establishment of underground classrooms and cooperatives, raisings of the banned Palestinian flag, and civil disobedience. The actions were led by the led by a decentralised leadership composed of the grassroots organisations of the PLO, such as labour unions, student councils, and women's committees, who organised themselves into the Unified National Leadership of the Uprising (UNLU), mainly outside of the direct control of the PLO leadership, who were mostly in exile or imprisoned (or had been killed by Israeli forces over the preceding years).

The Israeli government responded to the breakout of the Intifada with a harsh crackdown, however, with Minister of Defence Yitzhak Rabin pledging to suppress it using "force, might, and beatings," including ordering Israeli soldiers to break the bones of Palestinian protestors, imposing widespread lockdowns on Palestinian cities, mass arrests, and demolitions of Palestinian houses. During the later stages of the Intifada, as the Israeli crackdown severely damaged the Palestinian economy and morale, and as the PLO leadership in exile attempted to take on greater day-to-day control over the Intifada, the UNLU began to lose control over the uprising and the uprising grew more violent during its last stages, including Palestinian internal political violence against rumoured collaborators. By the end of the Intifada, over a thousand Palestinians had been killed and over a hundred thousand injured by Israeli forces, with around two hundred Israelis having been killed by Palestinians. The First Intifada would come to an end with several high-profile peace negotiations, including the Madrid Conference of 1991 and the 1993 Oslo Accords.

== Primary and secondary education ==
=== School closures ===
During the First Intifada, Palestinian youth played a major role in demonstrations, and many Palestinian youth participated in writing graffiti and throwing stones at Israeli soldiers. Writing in the NWSA Journal, Thomas M. Ricks stated that "public schools were centers of daily demonstrations in the schoolyards that inevitably led to Israeli forces arriving, shooting tear gas and warning shots over the girls' heads to stop the chanting and clapping. Inevitably, the high school girls ran into their classrooms and halls to avoid the 'rubber bullets,' live ammunition, and tear gas canisters. Almost all of the girls carried onions, water bottles, and handkerchiefs to ward off the effects of tear gas."

In response to youth participation in the Intifada, the Israeli government repeatedly issued orders forcing certain Palestinian primary and secondary schools to be closed, saying that closing the schools would prevent youth from gathering and organising, and would consequently prevent unrest and violence. At times, the Israeli government also imposed blanket orders forcing all schools across the Palestinian Territories to be closed, beginning in late December 1987. As well, Palestinian schools were frequently ordered closed when the Israeli government imposed curfews on Palestinian cities, confining all residents to their homes. Public schools across the Territories and UNRWA schools in Palestinian refugee camps were particularly targeted by the closure orders, as private and religious schools were seen as enforcing stricter discipline on their pupils. Some school buildings were taken over the Israeli military after being ordered closed, with the military using them as temporary outposts and detention centres.

In early February 1988, the Israeli government ordered almost all Palestinian schools indefinitely closed, alleging that the order was necessary to prevent further unrest. The schools would remain closed for four months, until June, when the Israeli government allowed them to re-open, claiming that the Intifada was losing momentum.

In early July 1988, the Israeli government again ordered all Palestinian schools closed, for a three day period, in response to calls by the UNLU for a general strike and for Palestinian schools to rename themselves with more Palestinian names.

In late January 1989, the Israeli government ordered all Palestinian schools in both the West Bank and the Gaza Strip indefinitely closed again, as part of a move to increase the force of the crackdown on the Intifada. Minister of Defence Yitzhak Rabin pledged that "schools that repeat stone throwing, I refer to high schools, will be closed, and we have already closed several schools," while Brigadier General Ariyeh Ramot stated that "I know that some children are doing this for fun. But it is very important that parents watch their children because today the throwing of a stone is liable to lead to very serious punishment."

In late July 1989, the Israeli government allowed Palestinian schools to re-open for the first time in six months, conditional on the schools preventing pupils from demonstrating. The Israeli military also ordered its soldiers to keep their distance from Palestinian schools on the day that the schools re-opened, following a request from Palestinian education leaders. Only one small clash occurred between Israeli soldiers and pupils that day in Beit Fajjar, with Israeli soldiers firing tear gas at a group of primary school pupils after the pupils threw stones at the soldiers. The re-opening also coincided with a general strike in the Palestinian Territories, causing some confusion among pupils as the PLO called for pupils to join the strike while Hamas called for students to return to school.

All Palestinian schools would be ordered closed again from mid January to late February 1991, during the Gulf War in Kuwait. The Gulf War closures were part of a general six-week curfew imposed on the Palestinian Territories by the Israeli government, where all Palestinians were ordered confined to their homes. Israeli settlers in the Territories were not included in the curfew, although were advised to be on high alert for possible Iraqi missile attacks, and were given free gas masks, which Palestinians were not offered. Throughout the rest of 1991, however, according to Human Rights Watch, "elementary and secondary schools were closed less frequently than in previous years. For the first time during the intifada, military authorities permitted schools to remain open in the summer months to make up for lost days."

=== School strikes and protests ===
As well as due to the forced closures of schools, Palestinian pupils during the First Intifada also several days of schooling due their participation in general strikes called for by the UNLU. In some cases, such as a March 1990 general strike called by the non-UNLU Hamas, participation in the strikes was enforced by gangs of Palestinian militants.

In mid-1990, the UNLU issued a leaflet calling for pupils to keep protests separate from their education.

One secondary school student from Bethlehem quoted by The New York Times in July 1988 stated that "There is no atmosphere to study, with soldiers at the entrance to schools," and saying of his fellow students, "Where are the others? One was shot and killed during the uprising, four are in jail and the other six are under curfew in the Dheishe refugee camp. Nobody is in the mood to study." A teacher from the El-Ma'amuniya High School in East Jerusalem quoted by The New York Times in October 1988 stated that "Students here will feel sentiment for their friends in the West Bank, and they'll strike."

=== Alternative and underground classrooms ===
To try and ensure that Palestinian youth were still able to access education during the school closures, Palestinians organised a number of alternative underground classrooms. Writing in the Radical Teacher, Yamila Hussein described two main forms of alternative classrooms organised by Palestinians during the Intifada: substitute teaching and popular teaching. The substitute teaching form, mostly led by UNRWA and private school teachers, focused on distance learning, creating self-study kits based on the Israeli-approved curriculum for pupils to use at home and holding exams outside of school grounds whenever curfews on cities were lifted. The popular teaching form, mostly led by the decentralised UNLU popular committees, involved members of a community giving ad hoc lessons to the youth of their community on their own field of work, and placed a focus on Palestinianising lessons instead of following the Israeli-approved curriculum.

Popular teaching initiatives took place in a number of ad hoc locations, including rooms in houses, gardens, mosques, and churches. Popular teaching initiatives were also largely led by community members without a formal training in education, including parents and local university students. One Palestianian who was a schoolgirl during the Intifada described popular teaching in the NWSA Journal: "we used to go to a neighborhood teacher's home and spend our days studying history, Arabic, geography, mathematics, and literature with students from the area. We were a strange mixture of public and private school kids using old books and our notes for lessons, reading at different levels, solving problems in different ways, and eagerly enjoying our new teachers and classmates. Sometimes, the teacher was arrested for having such schools so we had to find another teacher or a parent willing to help us with our lesssons." The Palestinian Museum in Birzeit described one underground popular teaching classroom:

"In the village of Kobar, a group of 12–14 individuals transformed a number of old rooms into classrooms, moving from house to house and inviting students to join them. The teachers were women and mothers from the village who never had any experience in teaching. The students, often of varying ages in the same class, would take turns in standing guard to watch for the arrival of the military in search of forbidden gatherings.
The flexibility of these schools was the most important demonstration of their revolutionary essence. For instance, when some girls would have to miss class to help their families in the field, the entire class would often move there. The content of the actual lessons included farming and the relationship of the farmer to the land. The students would deal with the publications of resistance organizations such as the UNLU as reading materials, using them as grammar practice in their Arabic language classes, and then proceeding to discuss their content in their political science classes."

Popular teaching initiatives also placed an emphasis on Palestinianising lessons, placing greater emphasis on teaching Palestinian culture and history than the Israeli-approved curriculum, while allowing pupils more freedom to discuss the Israeli–Palestinian conflict and current affairs. According to Joel Brinkley of The New York Times, wrote that "the Israeli Government did not realize that when the 277,000 West Bank school children were freed from the heavily controlled, politically sanitized school curriculum, many of them would instead attend free-form, underground schools that ignored all the Government's rules. Teachers in these schools – in churches, mosques and the basements of private homes – have in many cases been lecturing children on Palestinian history and discussing current events in a way they could not before, probably fueling the uprising"

=== Israeli crackdown on alternative education ===
The Israeli government banned both substitute teaching and popular teaching, as well as declaring the UNLU popular committees as terrorist organisations. Palestinian adults who participated as teachers in popular teaching initiatives faced threats of arrest, fines, and exile. Teachers who distributed at-home school work faced arrest. The Israeli military also placed buildings that it suspected of being used as popular teaching locations under increased surveillance, and increased patrols in the surrounding streets to prevent pupils from travelling to those locations. Writing in the Radical Teacher, Yamila Hussein described some of the Israeli government's moves to crackdown on underground classrooms:

"Israeli army officers told educational institutions administrators that "under no circumstances" were they allowed teaching "in houses or anywhere else." Israel barred UNRWA from serving thousands of refugee students in grades one through nine, warning administrators that distributing learning kits to children was an intolerable "unilateral action" breaching the closure order. Similarly, the head of the Friends Boys School in Ramallah was ordered to stop distributing the learning kits. Israeli soldiers raided and shut down rooms and buildings—including kindergartens—where educational activities took place, and they harassed and detained students and teachers, and confiscated books and equipment."

When UNRWA issued a formal statement complaining that the Israeli government was blocking its attempts to distribute self-study packs, a spokesperson for the Permanent Mission of Israel to the United Nations claimed that the Israeli government wanted schools to be re-opened "at least as much as the U.N. does," but that "the facts are that when all the kids are together, agitators come and do collective work in a short time."

As a result of the Israeli crackdown, most efforts at alternative education had largely ceased by the end of 1989.

=== Reactions from Palestinians ===
The school closures were widely seen by Palestinians as collective punishment and as an attempt to deny Palestinians access to education. The school closures were also seen by Palestianians as a way to manipulate the high value placed on education by Palestinian culture, so that the Israeli government could force Palestinian youth to choose between education or Palestinian self-determination. In a March 1988 leaflet, the Unified National Leadership of the Uprising (UNLU) claimed that "one of the main pillars of Zionist policy is making our people ignorant and depriving them of the most basic rights stipulated in international conventions, the right to education."

In a December 1988 report, Palestinian human rights NGO Al-Haq accused the Israeli government of trying to "undermine the institutional infrastructure of the Palestinian population in the occupied territories," through measures such as school closures, closures of other community organisations, and economic sanctions against Palestinian businesses.

=== Reactions from Israelis ===
In May 1989, Rabin claimed that the closures were necessary, as "once schools are open, the confrontation between kids, schoolboys and girls and the military forces of Israel increase the number of casualties among the youngsters," saying that "instead of having school open and many young casualties" it was better to "stop the schooling and to save casualties." Assad Arideh of the Israeli Civil Administration claimed that the school closures came at the request of Palestinians, saying that "many parents asked us to close them because their children were getting wounded."

In October 1988, the teachers' union affiliated with the Israeli Histadrut held a meeting with Rabin to urge him to end closures of Palestinian schools. In May 1989, a group of 400 Israeli university professors signed an open letter calling for the Israeli government to re-open Palestinian schools, accusing the government of collective punishment.

=== International reactions ===
In May 1989, United States Secretary of State James Baker called for the Israeli government to re-open schools in a speech given to the American Israel Public Affairs Committee. Following the July 1989 re-opening, the United States Senate passed a motion from Senator John Chafee calling for Israel not to close Palestinian schools in the future. A similar motion from Representative Howard C. Nielson was passed at the same time by the United States House of Representatives. Senator Mark Hatfield, a former teacher and Governor of Oregon, accused the Israeli government of "squandering the very basis of trust and cooperation by turning its back on the hopes and dreams of tens of thousands of children," adding that "I worry that some people in the Israeli government continue to believe, contrary to international law, that schools can be opened and closed at will—at political will. If these children cannot learn in school, surely they will learn on the streets. But the lessons they learn will not be reading and writing and arithmetic. They will be lessons of hatred and violence."

In June 1989, the member states of the European Economic Community released a joint statement expressing "serious concern" over the school closures, saying that they "consider that this measure, which is contrary to the basic right to education, threatens the future of a whole generation of young Palestinians."

=== Impact ===
The school closures and the crackdown on alternative education had a significant negative impact on Palestinian youth and their education. United Nations official Rolf Van Uye warned in May 1989 that "we now have thousands of 8-year-old illiterates." A secondary school headteacher in the West Bank quoted by The New York Times in May 1989 claimed that the closures were "creating a whole generation of students who are not going to have a proper education. The whole academic process is being destroyed, and we are going to suffer for 10, 15 years."

The closures and the collapse of UNLU leadership had a significant impact on the in-class atmosphere once schools were allowed to re-open in the later stages of the Intifada, with many teachers experiencing a loss of authority over pupils and an increase in cheating on tests. Many Palestinian teachers also suffered a significant drop in income, with the Israeli Civil Administration only issuing partial pay during the closures, and were forced to look for other jobs. Schools that had been taken over by the Israeli military faced difficulties in restoring their facilities once they were allowed to re-open, due to vandalism left by the Israeli soldiers. In one school described by Joel Greenberg of The Jerusalem Post: "Reporters visiting the Khalduniya school in Nablus saw broken windows, desks, chairs, and closets; anti-Arab graffiti and insignias of IDF units painted on and cut into walls; broken laboratory equipment and excrement in the bathrooms and adjacent rooms." According to Susan Nicolai of Save the Children, "the impact on education was dramatic. Many teachers were forced to retire, teachers unions were prohibited and students were expelled, arrested and prevented from travelling abroad. Palestinian schools were closed for extended periods and some universities shut down for more than four years. A number of schools were taken over as detention centres... The impact of these years continues to be felt: increased discipline problems and fascination with resistance appear to have contributed to a drop in academic standards at various levels of education."

The school closures were compounded by the wider effects of the uprising on youth. Many Palestinian youth suffered serious injuries at the hands of Israeli forces during the Intifada, some being left with permanent disabilities. The combination of the repeated strikes held during the Intifada, the Israeli crackdown on the uprising, and the collapse of the Palestinian economy, also significantly limited what Palestinian youth could do during their days. Joel Brinkley of The New York Times wrote in December 1989 that: "Many young Palestinians fill their free hours taunting soldiers or throwing stones at settlers' cars. But while their children are out, most adults have little choice but to sit home and watch television or stare at the walls. One overlooked fact of the uprising is that for most Palestinians it is excruciatingly boring. There are no movie theaters left in the West Bank or Gaza, no parks, no swimming pools, no playgrounds. Because of commercial strikes, nearly all the bars and restaurants are closed. Theater groups seldom perform. Under threat from uprising leaders, sports leagues have been disbanded. Intercity travel is dangerous and, under army regulations, often not allowed. And most Palestinians no longer visit movies, parks or other attractions inside Israel, for reasons of both politics and safety." Jamil Abu Tumeh, headteacher of the El-Ma'amuniya High School in East Jerusalem, stated that "The schools were closed, but did this mean the uprising was over? ... If the schools were open, it would be much quieter because we could keep the students busy with something."

According to Ricks:

"The irregularity of the school work, the mixing of students from various schools (private and government), the absence of texts and laboratory equipment, and the need to coordinate faculty travel between towns under curfew and closure meant that the experiment [of popular education] met with mixed results. While most of the students did continue to study both at home and in the popular schools, the lack of coordination of subjects and assignments reduced academic standards considerably. There was also a political risk in holding such classes in private homes because the popular schools were considered illegal gatherings. Thus, participants were subject to arrest and imprisonment. The excitement of the chance to openly protest the hated occupation since the June 1967 War meant a breakdown in domestic discipline by parent to child at home and in the street. Children as well as teenagers were aggressive with any person of authority, be they an Israeli military officer, a teacher, or a parent, so that home life as well as street life were scenes of quasi-anarchy... When the students at all levels did return to classes in their schools and universities in 1991, it was clear to the teachers and faculty that the Intifada created many skill and discipline problems. After two years of on again and off again home schooling, the students were not in the habit of studying, doing homework, reading, or writing. This is not to mention the increased disciplinary problems with the adult teachers, faculty, and administrators."

== Tertiary education ==
=== University closures ===
On 10 January 1988, Birzeit University was ordered closed indefinitely by the Israeli government, after the university's administration refused an Israeli demand to voluntarily close down. In the subsequent three weeks, the Israeli government issued indefinite closure orders to all other Palestinian universities and colleges. The Israeli government claimed that the closures were necessary to prevent unrest and violence. A number of university students and staff were also placed in administrative detention or targeted by deportation orders by the Israeli military throughout the Intifada. According to Penny Johnson of Birzeit University, "the closure of all educational institutions was unprecedented and demonstrates the gravity of the situation in the eyes of the military."

The closure orders had a significant negative impact on higher education and research in Palestine. While the universities were closed, the administration and faculty were banned from entering campus grounds. According to Joel Brinkley of The New York Times: "thousands of recent high school graduates are deprived of advanced education. Laboratories are closed to scientists, libraries with tens of thousands of volumes are off-limits to teachers, students and the public. A whole economy—transportation companies, stores, restaurants, even barbers—that served Palestinian college students, has been devastated." Universities sometimes had to cancel planned conferences and student exchange programmes.

Al-Quds University and Bethlehem University were allowed to re-open in 1990. Both universities were ordered shut again in January 1991, as part of the Gulf War curfew; and were allowed to re-open in mid-March 1991. On 1 May 1991, Hebron University was allowed to re-open by the Israeli government, while the government announced that the closure of Birzeit University would be extended, with the Ministry of Defence saying that "the success of the reopening process depends on the fact that this university will remain solely an academic institution, and not a center generating violence and disorder."

In May 1991, the Israeli government informed the administrations of the remaining closed Palestinian universities that they should begin repairs and other preparations necessary for students to return to campus. An-Najah National University and the Islamic University of Gaza were allowed to re-open in autumn 1991.

Birzeit University would be the last Palestinian university allowed to re-open, with the Israeli government allowing it to provisionally gradually faculty-by-faculty in late April 1992, beginning with the faculties of science and engineering.

=== Israeli motivations for the closures ===
According to Sameh Hallaq of Al-Quds University, "the Israeli Civil Administration and the Israeli army considered the universities’ administrations to be directly responsible for the conduct of students."

In May 1988, an Israeli military spokesperson stated that Palestinian universities "have traditionally been a hotbed of anti-Israeli protest." Brigadier General Freddy Zach, the Deputy Coordinator of Government Activities in the Territories, stated in May 1991 that "we are not against education. But when the intifada started three years ago, the universities were centers of violence."

=== Reactions ===
Birzeit University acting President Gabi Baramki claimed in May 1991 that the Israeli government was "using the universities to blackmail the whole Palestinian community," while adding that "the real damage is that the Israelis are not preparing partners for the future. The basic reason for the closure, of course, is punishment. But our basic purpose is preparing Palestinian youth for leadership. So the result will be the Israelis won't have anyone to talk to, and the longer this goes on the worse it will get." Hava Lazarus-Yafeh of the Hebrew University of Jerusalem warned that "If we keep the universities shut, the leaders will develop in prison. We had better let the future leadership of the Palestinians grow in universities rather than grow frustrated and angry in jails."

=== Protests and alternative education ===
As with primary and secondary schools, university and college professors in Palestine organised a number of alternative education initiatives to try and continue teaching throughout the closures. Students frequently had to cover up and conceal their textbooks when travelling to underground classes, to avoid Israeli soldiers from confiscating the textbooks. Alternative university initiatives, however, frequently suffered from lack of access to necessary equipment, such as scientific and computer laboratories, as well as from a lack of access to academic libraries. University students and professors also participated in the popular teachings initiatives for primary and secondary school pupils, by organising and giving lessons in their hometowns.

Palestinian students and academic also organised a number of protests against the university closures, including sit-ins in front of the Israeli military checkpoint blocking the way onto campuses, demonstrations in the centres of university cities, and attempts to sneak past the Israeli military and hold lessons inside the campuses in defiance of the closure orders.

The closure orders, as well as the history of Palestinian university closures in the 1970s and 1980s (such as Birzeit University, which was closed fourteen times between late-1973 and mid-1987), spurred debates within the Palestinian academic community over potential university reforms to minimise the impact of future closures. Reforms such as switching to an academic model where frequent classroom attendance was less necessary, inspired by the British model, or where classes were split into shorter, more intensive modules, or the creation of a Palestinian Open University, were considered. The question of how to admit and transition secondary school students who were graduating during the Intifada into universities was also a topic of significant debate, as both secondary and higher education were severely disrupted. As well, during the university closures, the UNLU urged academics to document the Intifada and to try and use their contacts abroad to publicise the Israeli crackdown on the uprising, particularly as local Palestinian newspaper were frequently subject to military censorship during the Intifada.

== See also ==
- Attacks on schools during the Israeli invasion of Gaza
