= Jerusalem Media & Communication Centre =

Palestinian non-governmental organization

Jerusalem Media & Communication Centre (JMCC)
- Founded: 1988
- Type: Non-profit
- Website: http://www.jmcc.org

The Jerusalem Media & Communication Centre (JMCC; Arabic: مركز القدس للإعلام والاتصال) is a Palestinian non-governmental organization based in East Jerusalem, which provides information about events in Gaza and the West Bank including East Jerusalem to journalists, researchers and international agencies.

== History and funding ==
The JMCC was established in 1988 by a group of Palestinian researchers and Journalists. It has offices in Gaza and Jerusalem which carry out a range of activities including providing translations and background documents, field work, as well as conducting survey research and opinion polls. The centre is co-publisher of the Palestinian-Israeli internet-based political magazine bitterlemons.

The JMCC was the first Palestinian organization to conduct regular opinion polls of Palestinian political attitudes. Since 1993 these polls gauging Palestinian opinion on such issues as democracy, the peace process, political leadership and factions have become an important benchmark on the state of the peace process in the Israeli–Palestinian conflict.

According to Joel Beinin, the JMCC established its reputation during the first Intifada by enabling foreign journalists and visitors "to see beyond the official Israeli version of events", through the use of its services. He has also praised the organisation's published research into obstacles to economic development in the Occupied Palestinian Territories.
