= Joost Hiltermann =

Dutch activist, journalist and writer

- Born: Joost R. Hiltermann
- Occupations: journalist activist & writer

Joost R. Hiltermann is a Dutch activist, journalist and writer. He is the Program Director, MENA for International Crisis Group. He was previously its chief operating officer.

== Education ==
Hiltermann earned an MA degree in International Relations from Johns Hopkins School of Advanced International Studies in 1980, and a PhD in Sociology from University of California, Santa Cruz in 1988.

== Published works ==
- A Poisonous Affair: America, Iraq, and the Gassing of Halabja Cambridge University Press (2007) ISBN 978-0521876865
- Behind the Intifada: Labor and Women’s Movements in the Occupied Territories Princeton University Press (1991)
