= Palestinian Centre for the Study of Nonviolence =

Centre devoted to non-violent resistance

The Palestinian Centre for the Study of Nonviolence (PCSN) was founded in 1983 by Mubarak Awad, a Palestinian-American psychologist, and an advocate of nonviolent resistance.

Awad, who was born in Jerusalem in 1943, returned to the city on a tourist visa in 1983 to establish the nonviolence centre. His plan was to collate information about reconciliation, peace, justice and nonviolence from Arabic literature and Islamic texts and use the material to inform Palestinians that these ideas came from their cultural heritage. He believed that these ideas would help Palestinians generate their own ideas on these issues. Awad was part of a group of twenty Palestinian intellectuals who advocated nonviolent tactics of intifada and wrote leaflets calling for sit-down strikes local production of food and wrote a long article containing 120 ways nonviolence ways to resist Israelis. Awad traveled through the West Bank on scooter, organizing seminars. A preparation meeting for opening the center was held in 1984 in which Awad, human rights lawyer Jonathan Kuttab and American nonviolence strategist Gene Sharp took part. Initially Kuttab raised the money in United States and in 1985 the center got founding from Hisham Sharabi, Chair of Arab Culture at the Center for Contemporary Arab Studies, Georgetown University in Washington, D.C., who was familiar with Awad's work and the center was officially established.

In 1987, Awad attempted to renew the residency permit he had been issued in 1967. His application was declined and he was ordered to leave the country when his tourist visa expired. Awad claimed, with strong support from U.S. consular officials, that under international conventions Israel did not have the right to expel him from his place of birth and he refused to leave. The Israeli government stayed the deportation order mainly at the insistence of the U.S. In May 1988, Prime Minister Yitzhak Shamir ordered Awad arrested and expelled. Officials charged that Awad broke Israeli law by inciting "civil uprising" and helping to write leaflets that advocated civil disobedience that were distributed by the leadership of the First Intifada. No evidence was provided to support the charge and Awad appealed the decision to the Supreme Court. The court ruled that he had forfeited his right to residence status in Israel when he became a U.S. citizen and he was deported in June 1988. U.S. Secretary of State George Shultz's appeal to Shamir to revoke the deportation order was declined.

In 1998 Holy Land Trust (HLT) was established out of PCSN and The Journey of the Magi (JOM) by Sami Awad, Mubarak Awad's nephew.
