= Unified National Leadership of the Uprising =

Palestinian political coalition

The Unified National Leadership of the Uprising (UNLU; Arabic: القيادة الوطنية الموحدة, romanized: al-Qiyada al-Muwhhada) was a coalition of local Palestinian leadership during the First Intifada.

By the late 1980s, the central Palestine Liberation Organisation (PLO) leadership had largely been exiled, imprisoned, or killed by Israeli forces. As a result, when the First Intifada broke out as spontaneous mass demonstrations in 1987, the PLO leadership was caught by surprise, and could only indirectly influence the events. In its place, the UNLU emerged as a new local leadership, mobilising many grassroots Palestinian groups, including women's committees, labour unions, and student unions, the Palestine Communist Party, as well as local branches of PLO factions, notably of Fatah, the PFLP, and the DFLP. The UNLU played the leading role in organising the uprising, and was the focus of the social cohesion that sustained the persistent disturbances.

== History ==
=== Origins ===
Until the late 1970s, the Palestinian nationalist movement was dominated by the Palestine Liberation Organisation (PLO), a coalition of armed Palestinian nationalist groups that focused on guerrilla warfare against Israel based on Palestinian refugees in exile. Through the late 1970s and 1980s, however, a shift in the Palestinian nationalist movement occurred away from guerrilla warfare towards mass civilian organising. During this period, the Israeli government enacted increasingly harsh anti-PLO tactics, including banning the National Guidance Committee and invading Lebanon in 1982, leading to much of the PLO's central leadership being pushed further away in exile to Tunisia, imprisoned, or killed.

At the same time, grassroots Palestinian civil society organisations within the occupied territories significantly increased in number and influence, including student unions, labour unions, women's committees, and volunteer groups. Although many of these organisations were affiliated with and supportive of the PLO, they represented a more decentralised leadership with new tactics. According to historian Wendy Pearlman, "tens of thousands of men, women, and youth became linked in political networks. This grassroots organising represented a radical alternative to traditional, top-down patterns of politics. It schooled a new generation that was raised under occupation, was not afraid to challenge it, and viewed community-based political participation as a way of life." A member of the UNLU interviewed by The New York Times in early February 1988 stated on the UNLU's formation: "The important thing is that a grassroots infrastructure was already in existence. Unions, women's committees, every faction had its own infrastructure."

An average of 500 protests were held in the occupied territories each year between 1977 and 1982, increasing to an average of over 3000 between 1982 and 1987. In mid-1987, Glenn Frankel of The Washington Post noted that there was "a shift in the nature of the struggle here," moving away from a conflict between the Israeli military and "professional terrorists imported from outside the West Bank" towards a conflict that centred around incidents that were "initiated locally, most of them by Palestinian youths."

=== Formation ===
Different Palestinian grassroots organisations began to coalesce into a more structured leadership in the weeks following the outbreak of the Intifada in December 1987. The UNLU issued its first leaflet on 8 January 1988. Sari Nusseibeh recorded the birth of the UNLU in a 1989 article:

For two weeks the fire [of the revolt] in almost unfathomable proportions. Even the local grassroots committees, activists and leaders were caught off guard. ... The first underground leaflets of the intifada made a shy appearance. ... The Communiqués No. 2 of the Intifada appeared. Rumours have it that it was at this stage, through consultations with, and with the aid and blessing of Abu Jihad [Fatah second in command Khalil Wazir], that the Unified Command was conceived and created. ... Communiqués No. 3 enshrining the birth of the Unified Command appeared. The uprising leaflets suddenly took on a special format, which continues to exist till this day."

The second leaflet of the UNLU contained a list of political demands, including an end to the Israeli Iron Fist policy, for Ariel Sharon to be evicted from his recently purchased flat in the Old City of Jerusalem, the withdrawal of Israeli forces from Palestinian cities, the dissolution of municipal councils appointed by the Israeli Civil Administration to replace the elected councils, and closure of several prisons with a notorious reputation among Palestinians.

According to Glenn E. Robinson of the Naval Postgraduate School, "the UNLU consisted of the best and the brightest of local PLO grassroots cadres, not the recognized top political leaders. The factions inside the occupied territories decided that the UNLU representatives should come from among the young, smart, rising stars in each faction. While such people were highly thought of in their respective factions, they would still be relative unknowns to the Shin Bet, therefore unlikely candidates for early arrest."

=== Fragmentation ===
In the later stages of the Intifada, the continuing Israeli crackdown on the Intifada had severely impacted Palestinian society, many experienced Palestinian activists had been arrested by Israel, and the Intifada had yet to create an independent Palestinian state. As a result, the different Palestinian political factions increasingly began infighting over the direction of the Intifada, and the UNLU began to lose its authority over the uprising.

The last major sweep of arrests of UNLU members was carried out by the Israeli military in March 1990. Following those arrests, what remained of the UNLU was completely taken over by more senior prominent Palestinians with more direct links to the PLO leadership-in-exile, such as Faisal Husseini , Zahira Kamal, and Ghassan Khatib.

The new leadership of the UNLU would go on to form the core of the Palestinian negotiators at the Madrid Conference of 1991.

== Organisation ==
=== Leadership ===
Four Palestinian factions were represented in the UNLU leadership: Fatah, the Popular Front for the Liberation of Palestine (PFLP), the Democratic Front for the Liberation of Palestine (DFLP), and the Palestine Communist Party.

According to Wendy Pearlman of Northwestern University, the UNLU "purposely varied protest locations or tasks to give communities time to rest or to distribute burdens across society. It also took measures to aid its own sustainability; when Israel arrested members, their factions replaced them, allowing the body to carry forward." According to Jack McGinn of the London School of Economics, the UNLU "relied on a constantly rotating membership made up of lower-ranking members of the big parties, so as to minimise damage incurred upon their arrest."

=== Popular committees ===
On a local scale, the Intifada was coordinated by local popular committees under the UNLU, and UNLU communiqués were shaped via consultation with the popular committees. These popular committees also set-up social services for Palestinians in their localities, acting as de facto local governments and forming parallel power structures that could supplant the Israeli Civil Administration.

The first popular committees were founded as emergency committees in response to the early Israeli attempts to crackdown on the Intifada, particularly to organise food supplies for the inhabitants of areas placed under curfew by the Israeli military, to provide first aid for those injured in demonstrations, to keep watch for Israeli military patrols, and to organise underground classrooms to continue the education of Palestinian children when the Israeli government ordered Palestinian schools closed. According to Glenn E. Robinson of the Naval Postgraduate School, "the success of the first popular committees in supplying emergency services to communities under siege helped to consolidate the early gains of the uprising."

As the unrest of the early Intifada coalesced into a popular uprising, the number of popular committees grew significantly. The committees soon took on a wide range of functions, including arbitrating disputes between residents, leading road safety education, helping residents create "victory gardens," assisting the bereavement for family members of those killed by Israeli forces, collecting taxes, and cleaning streets.

In the first few months of the uprising meetings of popular committee were not specifically illegal, but popular committee leaders were still subject to arrest and deportation by Israeli authorities. In mid-August 1988, the Israeli government specifically banned the popular committees, stating that the popular committees were "established at the initiative of terror organisation activists" and "have a double aim: violent enforcement of directives from the PLO and uprising leaders; undermining the Israel government apparatus in the territories and establishing an alternative apparatus in its place." Anyone who was a member of a committee, attended a committee meeting, had possession of a committee document (including UNLU communiqués), or gave money to a committee facing up to ten years incarceration. According to Joel Greenberg of The Jerusalem Post, the Israeli government had come to see the popular committees "as the primary threat of the uprising... Palestinian nationalists see the popular committees as kernels of a future independent administration, an embryonic infrastructure of their future state. For precisely this reason, the committees were outlawed."

In later stages of the Intifada, a combination of the Israeli crackdown and an increase in internal factionalism largely led to the abandoning of the popular committees.

=== Strike forces ===
While the popular committees under the UNLU were non-violent, the Intifada also saw the development of strike forces. The strike forces initially emerged as local groups charged with enforcing the directions of the UNLU, such as the hours of strike actions and the banning of selling Israeli goods in shops. In later stages of the Intifada, as the uprising lost its sense of direction, the strike forces would become singificant perpetrators of Palestinian internal political violence, such as the killing of rumoured collaborators.

=== Relationship to the central PLO leadership ===
While emerging from grassroots organisations affiliated with the PLO and declaring its allegiance to the PLO, the UNLU was separate to the central leadership of the PLO (who were mostly in exile in Tunisia) and at times presented a challenge to the PLO leadership of the Palestinian nationalist movement. According to Nadia Naser-Najjab of the University of Exeter and Ghassan Khatib of Birzeit University, "the UNLU’s challenge to established hierarchies was of particular concern to the PLO’s exiled leaders, who, at least during the initial stages of the intifada, were still responding to ongoing developments."

The central leadership of the PLO in Tunisia made contact with the UNLU relatively early in the Intifada, particularly through Khalil al-Wazir, the Fatah official in Tunis who had been assigned responsibility for the occupied territories. The PLO leaders in Tunisia issued directives for the UNLU However, the PLO was at first largely unable to force the UNLU to comply with its directives, and the communiqués distributed by the UNLU throughout the occupied territories were largely based on the UNLU's own decisions. According to Salim Tamari of the Institute for Palestine Studies, during the first year of the Intifada, the UNLU "imposed its own perceptions and initiatives of the mass movement on the external leadership of the PLO, reversing a pattern that characterized the first 20 years of occupation," culminating in the Palestinian Declaration of Independence.

As the Intifada continued, the UNLU became increasingly institutionalised as subordinate to the PLO, and the PLO leadership in Tunisia took on larger roles in drafting and editing UNLU communiqués. This subordination was in part voluntary, as the UNLU did not wish to be seen as undermining the PLO and wished for Israel to recognise the PLO as the legitimate representative of the Palestinian people. The subordination was also influenced by the Israeli's governments to suppress the UNLU, including repeated arrests of UNLU members, leaving them unable to consistently push back against the PLO.

== Political positions ==
The UNLU positioned itself as a left-wing political actor, often referring to the "great Palestinian working class" in its communiqués, encouraging Palestinians to join labour unions, and declaring a belief in the ability of strike action to bring about political change.

The UNLU also largely prioritised non-violent resistance to Israeli occupation - a study by the Palestinian Centre for the Study of Nonviolence found that 95% of the actions called for in the UNLU's first 17 communiqués were non-violent, and over 90% in the next 22 communiqués, with the calls that were violent limited to less-lethal violence such as stone-throwing.

During the early stages of the Intifada, the UNLU ordered an amnesty for Palestinians who had been collaborating with the Israeli authorities, leading to the widespread collapse of the Israeli collaboration network in the occupied territories. During 1989, however, as the Israeli aggressively moved to rebuild their collaboration network and began providing paramilitary training to some of its collaborators, the UNLU had revoked its relative tolerance and began calling for collaborators to be punished. By 1990, however, as the UNLU lost its authority over the Intifada, it uncessucessfully appealed for a return to its earlier tolerance, calling for Palestinians to "give time for repentance. Try to reform before applying any punishment."

The UNLU and Ghassan Andoni in Beit Sahour, urged people to stop paying taxes to Israel, which inherited and modified the previous Jordanian tax-collection regime in the West Bank. "No taxation without representation," said a statement from the organizers. "The military authorities do not represent us, and we did not invite them to come to our land. Must we pay for the bullets that kill our children or for the expenses of the occupying army?" The people of Beit Sahour responded to this call with an organized citywide tax strike that included refusal to pay and file tax returns.

Unlike Hamas, the UNLU rejected a hijab policy for women. They have also targeted those who seek to impose the hijab.

== Analysis ==
=== New generation of Palestinian leadership ===
The older prominent personalities that had previously dominated Palestinian politics were supplanted by new more youthful politicians rising from the cadres of the UNLU. In 1988, Don Peretz of Binghamton University noted that the clandestine UNLU leadership was "assumed to be young, well educated, not tied to the traditionalists or notables," with "many are sons and daughters of the refugee camps, who have achieved upward social mobility through the expanding educational networks."

=== Democratic and decentralised nature ===
According to Nadia Naser-Najjab of the University of Exeter and Ghassan Khatib of Birzeit University, "in direct opposition to past revolutionary vanguards, the UNLU consistently refused to centralize power. Broad-based participation also made an important contribution to the intifada, and the popular committees became increasingly prominent as the uprising progressed. Participatory structures and institutions were developed, provided alternative foundations for popular mobilization, and fed into a sophisticated UNLU strategy." J. Kristen Urban of Mount St. Mary's University has argued that the UNLU's communiqués served as a "de facto Constitution for a people in the process of nation-building," and that the UNLU, "in coordinating the events of the Intifada, was thereby laying groundwork within the OT for the development of a state of Palestine grounded in democratic principles," particularly through its embrace of the popular committees, widespread mass mobilisation, and grassroots organisations. According to Urban, however, by mid-1989, the UNLU began to shift towards a more right-wing, more hierarchical position, with popular participation to be restricted to implementing decisions of the central leadership.

According to Ziad Abu-Amr of Birzeit University, "the question of decentralization of leadership has been a bone of contention within the UNL. The Communists prefer that a greater role be given to the national and popular committees, while other groups, Fatah in particular, prefer greater centralization of leadership and maintaining closer coordination with the PLO leadership in exile."

=== Rivalry with Islamist factions ===
While the First Intifada was largely led by the UNLU, the uprising also saw the emergence of new Palestinian nationalist groups entirely unaffiliated with the PLO, most notably the conservative Islamist Hamas. These Islamist factions grew to represent a major rival to the UNLU.

According to Khalid Farraj, a prominent Birzeit University student organiser during the Intifada, divisions grew significantly between Palestinian nationalist factions during the later stages of the Intifada, and "primary among the factors that deepened the rift was the meteoric rise of local Islamist movements, and particularly Hamas, which was staunchly opposed to the political process and committed to the armed struggle. The movement made huge inroads among the population during the intifada, and Hamas activists followed the directives of their own leadership — which were issued monthly — rather than abiding by UNLU directives."

=== Outcome of the Intifada ===
According to J. Kristen Urban of Mount St. Mary's University, while the initial Intifada protests in December 1987 were spontaneous, the UNLU played a major role in sustaining and broadening the scope of the unrest through the first half of 1988: the UNLU was "acutely aware" that previous waves of Palestinian unrest in the 1970s and 1980s had failed to endure for more than a couple of weeks.

Palestinian researcher Jamil Hilal sees the increased subordination of the UNLU to the PLO leaders in Tunisia as the Intifada continued as "a major factor in the Intifada losing the impetus it had gained by the participation of its organized, popular grassroots". Palestinian historian Mustafa Kabha has argued that "the strategy of leading by remote control, as well as increasing acts of revenge and the elimination of those suspected of collaborating with Israel, brought the intifada to a dead end." According to Glenn E. Robinson of the Naval Postgraduate School, "the devolution of authority during the Intifada led directly to many of the problems faced by the Palestinian Authority in the post-Oslo period. Essentially, an outside power - the PLO in Tunis - tried to impose its centralised power hierarchy on a population in which day-to-day authority was located at the grassroots."

== Bibliography ==
1. Zachary Lockman, Joel Beinin (1989) Intifada: The Palestinian Uprising Against Israeli Occupation South End Press, ISBN 0-89608-363-2
2. Joel Beinin, Joe Stork, Middle East Report (1997) Political Islam: essays from Middle East Report I.B.Tauris, ISBN 1-86064-098-2
3. Suha Sabbagh (1998) Palestinian women of Gaza and the West Bank Indiana University Press, ISBN 0-253-33377-6
4. Robert Freedman (1991) The Intifada: Its Impact on Israel, the Arab World, and the Superpowers University Press of Florida, ISBN 0-8130-1040-3
5. Gilles Kepel, Anthony F. Roberts (2006) Jihad: the trail of political Islam Translated by Anthony F. Roberts I.B.Tauris, ISBN 1-84511-257-1
6. Glenn E. Robinson (1997) Building a Palestinian state: the incomplete revolution Indiana University Press, ISBN 0-253-21082-8
7. Akhil Gupta, James Ferguson (1997) Culture, power, place: explorations in critical anthropology Duke University Press, ISBN 0-8223-1940-3
8. (1994) Speaking stones : communiqués from the Intifada underground. Compiled, edited, and translated by Shaul Mishal and Reuben Aharoni Syracuse University Press, ISBN 0-8156-2606-1
