= Cooperatives in the First Intifada =

During the First Intifada, from 1987 to 1991, Palestinians established a number of cooperatives with the goal of increasing the autonomy of the Palestinian economy.

== Background ==
On 9 December 1987, an Israeli truck driver collided with and killed four Palestinians in the Jabalia refugee camp. The incident sparked the largest wave of Palestinian unrest since the Israeli occupation began in 1967: the First Intifada. During the early stages, the Intifada was largely characterised by a non-violent campaign led by a decentralised, grassroots leadership, with actions including labour strikes, tax strikes, boycotts of Israeli goods, boycotts of Israeli institutions, demonstrations, the establishment of underground classrooms and cooperatives, raisings of the banned Palestinian flag, and civil disobedience. The Israeli government responded to the breakout of the Intifada with a harsh crackdown, however, and the Intifada grew more violent during its last stages, including Palestinian internal political violence against rumoured collaborators. By the end of the Intifada, over a thousand Palestinians had been killed and over a hundred thousand injured by Israeli forces, with around two hundred Israelis having been killed by Palestinians. The First Intifada would come to an end with several high-profile peace negotiations, including the Madrid Conference of 1991 and the 1993 Oslo Accords.

== Strategy ==
In 1989, Roderick Shaw of Tribune wrote:

A local Palestinian activist told me that Israeli occupation had made life difficult, long before the intifada. He said that villages around Hebron were slowly running down because Israeli authorities denied them permission to connect water and electricity. To build anywhere requires satisfying a long set of rules, and often takes two years. Palestinian farmers are also prevented from exporting most of their produce, or even selling it in Israel. Whereas Israeli products flood the occupied territories every year, threatening to drown local producers. Since the intifada began Palestinians have increasingly boycotted Israeli goods, relying more on their growing cottage industries. Kiryat Arba settlers have no such problems. They live in modern buildings with adequate electricity and water supplies. They even have a factory built at public expense to provide them with employment.

As part of the Intifada, Palestinians boycotted Israeli goods and jobs, as well as the services offered by the Israeli Civil Administration, and set up a number of economic cooperatives to increase their own economical self-reliance, particularly in the food industries. According to Sumud – The Finnish Palestine Network co-founder Majed Abusalama: "women grew food at homes and on rooftops and founded agricultural cooperatives which they called victory gardens, to create an autonomous Palestinian economy and enable the boycott of Israeli products." According to journalist Judith Gabriel, "heading the list of tangible, self-sustaining projects encouraged by the popular committees was the revival of household economies. The idea was simple: with little initial capital, a family with two goats, a few chickens, and rabbits, could produce their own milk, eggs, and meat; and by cultivating a garden, fruit, vegetables, wheat, and fodder as well."

The Palestinian Agricultural Relief Committee played a significant role in disseminating information on how to grow vegetables in the victory gardens, and distributed hundreds of thousands of seed packets by mid 1988. The American Near East Refugee Aid NGO was also active in supporting the establishment of agricultural cooperatives in Palestine during the First Intifada, including in the purchasing of equipment, training of farmers, and the establishment of mobile veterinary clinics.

Cooperatives were not limited to the growth of food. For example, one cooperative in Beit Sahour focused on providing tools and pesticides to agricultural cooperatives, and others focused on planting trees, with the Al-Shabaka, The Palestinian Policy Network stating that "over 500,000 trees were planted across Palestine between 1987 and 1989" as a result of the Intifada cooperatives. Other focused focused on the production of textiles, medical supplies, and cleaning public spaces.

As part of its general response to the Intifada, the Israeli government banned the popular committees that organised many of the grassroots actions in Palestine and significantly increased its efforts to recruit collaborators. Members who worked in cooperative projects faced higher likelihoods of being arrested by the Israeli military. The Israeli government also tried to specifically counter the growth of agricultural cooperatives during the Intifada. It took a number of measures, including ordering town markets to be closed, banning the transport of produce between Palestinian districts, restricting the ability of Palestinians to obtain permission to export produce to the Kingdom of Jordan, and bulldozing Palestinian fields. The frequent curfews imposed by the Israeli military, confining Palestinians to their homes, also had the effect of impeding Palestinians from tending to their gardens.

== Notable examples ==
=== Beit Sahour dairy cooperative ===
Beit Sahour, a majority Christian town in the West Bank, became a prominent symbol of the First Intifada due its comprehensive tax strike during the uprising, and the subsequent 42-day blockade of the town imposed by the Israeli military. The town also gained prominence for its efforts to set up a dairy cooperative during the Intifada, by buying eighteen cows from a sympathetic Jewish kibbutz and sending a university student from the town abroad to consult with experts on dairy farming techniques.

The Israeli military, however, reacted harshly to the creation of the dairy cooperative, declaring it a threat to national security and ordering the town's residents to close the cooperative, or else it would be destroyed. The residents subsequently hid the cows, sometimes inside their homes, and covertly distributed the milk the cows produced, and for four years evaded repeated attempts by the Israeli military to search the village and seize the cows.

In 2014, a Palestinian-Canadian animated documentary film was released about the Beit Sahour dairy cooperative, titled The Wanted 18.
