= Reagan peace plan =

1982 peace proposal to resolve the Israeli-Arab conflict

The Reagan peace plan, also known as the Reagan Middle East peace plan, was announced by United States President Ronald Reagan during a speech on September 1, 1982. The plan's stated goals was to "reconcile Israel's legitimate security concerns with the legitimate rights of the Palestinians." It proposed a five-year transition period, during which Palestinians in the West Bank and Gaza would obtain full autonomy, and an association of the territories with Jordan.

== Background ==
After emerging victorious in the Six-Day War in 1967, Israel occupied the Palestinian West Bank and Gaza Strip, as well as the Syrian Golan Heights and the Egyptian Sinai Peninsula. The Israeli government, particularly after the right-wing Likud came to power for the first time in 1977, began promoting Jewish settlement in the occupied territories. The number of settlers increased by 70 percent between 1981 and 1982, leading to increasing clashes between settlers and Palestinians. At the same time, the Israeli government refused to negotiate directly with the Palestinian Liberation Organisation (PLO), recognized by the U.N. as the representative of the Palestinian people, and moved to suppress any advocacy for Palestinian nationalism, including dismissing elected Palestinian city councils, repeatedly shutting down Palestinian universities, banning Palestinian newspapers, and banning an extensive list of books.

The Israeli occupation of the Sinai Peninsula would come to an end with the Camp David Accords, signed between Israel and Egypt with American mediation in 1978. The Accords, which were negotiated without any Palestinian representatives, also stipulated that the Palestinians must achieve 'full autonomy' and that Israel should withdraw to 'specific military locations' in the West Bank. The PLO, which was backed by the Soviet Union, rejected the 'Camp David conspiracy', believing it detracted from "the complete liberation of all the land of Palestine." When the Reagan administration took office in January 1981, it was preoccupied with the Cold War and viewed America's cooperation with Israel primarily as a means to contain the common Soviet threat, rather than to advance the prospects of Israeli-Arab peace. As well, Reagan viewed the PLO as terrorists and stated he would refuse to negotiate with it even if it accepted United Nations Security Council Resolution 242. Consequently, Reagan and his administration initially largely ignored the Israeli–Palestinian conflict and pressure from the governments of Egypt and Saudi Arabia to help build peace in the region.

In mid 1982, however, Israel invaded Lebanon to end the PLO insurgency in Southern Lebanon and install a pro-Israel government in Beirut, beginning the 1982 Lebanon War. While the war resulted in the expulsion of the PLO from Lebanon, the American public's outrage at the death and destruction during the siege of Beirut prompted the Reagan administration to propose a peace plan.

"King Fahd called begging me to do something. I told him I was calling P.M. Begin immediately. And I did—I was angry. I told him it had to stop or our entire future relationship was endangered. I used the word holocaust deliberately & said the symbol of his war was becoming a picture of a 7 month old baby with its arms blown off. " (Reagan diary, Thursday, August 12, 1982)

== Main points ==
The plan was based on the outcomes of the Camp David Accords, as well as Security Council Resolutions 242 and 338. Some commentators have described the contents of the plan as "vaguely worded".

The following main points were outlined in a statement by Secretary Shultz before the Senate Foreign Relations Committee on September 10, 1982:

Israeli Sovereignty/Palestinian State. It is the President's belief that the Palestinian problem cannot be resolved through Israeli sovereignty or control over the West Bank and Gaza. Accordingly, we will not support such a solution. We will also not support the formation of a Palestinian state in those negotiations. There is no foundation of political support in Israel or in the United States for such a solution and peace cannot be achieved by that route. The preference we will pursue in the final status negotiations is some form of association of the West Bank and Gaza with Jordan.
Self-determination. In the Middle East context, the term "self-determination" has been identified exclusively with the formation of a Palestinian state. We will not support this definition of self-determination. We do believe that the Palestinians must take a leading role in determining their own future and fully support the provisions in the Camp David agreement providing for the elected representatives of the inhabitants of the West Bank and Gaza to decide how they shall govern themselves consistent with the provisions of their agreement in the final status negotiations.
Jerusalem. We will fully support the position that Jerusalem must be undivided and that its status must be determined through negotiations. We do not recognize unilateral acts with respect to final status issues.
Settlements. The status of Israeli settlements must be determined in the course of the final status negotiations. We will not support their continuation as extraterritorial outposts, but neither will we support efforts to deny Jews the opportunity to live in the West Bank and Gaza under the duly constituted governmental authority there, as Arabs live in Israel.

The plan suggested a five-year transition period, during which the Palestinians in the West Bank and Gaza Strip obtain full autonomy over their affairs. Its purpose would be to prove that the Palestinians are capable of managing their own affairs, and that Palestinian autonomy would not pose a threat to Israel's security.

== Failure of the plan ==
=== Rejection by the Israeli government ===
The Israeli Government, led by Menachem Begin, and the Knesset, quickly opposed the initiative. On 3 September 1982, Begin's cabinet voted unanimously to reject the Plan, releasing an official communiqué claiming that Reagan's proposals "seriously deviate from the Camp David agreement, contradict it and could create a serious danger to Israel, its security and its future." Specifically, the communiqué stated that:

1. The city of Jerusalem was indivisible under Israeli sovereignty and that Palestinian residents of the annexed East Jerusalem could not be given voting rights in a future Palestinian authority;
2. That Israel would need to continue to have jurisdiction over internal security in the Palestinian territories or else the PLO would "perpetrate constant bloodshed;"
3. That Israeli settlement in the Palestinian territories was "a Jewish inalienable right and an integral part of our national security;"
4. That autonomy could only refer to autonomy for residents of the Palestinian territories and not for Palestine as a territory;
5. That the Camp David Accords made no mention of social and economic ties between the West Bank, Gaza, and Jordan;
6. That there was nothing in the Camp David Accords that precluded Israel from achieving full sovereignty over the Palestinian territories after the establishment of an autonomous Palestinian authority;
7. That the American had pledged not to support the establishment of an independent Palestinian state, but that Reagan's Plan "proves this to be an illusion," and that nothing in the Plan would stop King Hussein of Jordan from ceding control over Palestinian to the PLO, at which point the PLO would "conclude a pact with Soviet Russia and arm itself with every kind of modern weaponry" so that it could "launch an onslaught against Israel to destroy her" in coalition with other Arab states such as Iraq, Syria, and Saudi Arabia.

The government further accused Reagan of breaking a 1975 promise that the US would coordinate any peace proposals with Israel. On 4 September 1982, Minister of Defence Ariel Sharon stated in a radio interview that "the U.S. will have no alternative but to drop the proposals because they cannot be implemented, and Israel will not even discuss them." Israeli Minister of Internal Affairs Yosef Burg stated that "we cannot accept that settlements are an obstacle to peace... Eretz Yisrael cannot be restricted to our children," accusing the plan of having given "vitamins and hormones to the PLO." Deputy Prime Minister David Levy stated that "as friends you must know that there is one subject on which there will be no concessions — the idea of the creation of a Palestinian State." On 6 September 1982, the government released the text of a personal letter sent by Begin to Reagan commenting on the Plan in which Begin stated that "A friend does not weaken his friend, an ally does not put his ally in jeopardy," adding that "What some call the 'West Bank,' Mr. President, is Judea and Samaria; and this simple historic truth will never change" and that "you did not, Mr. President, even mention the bravery of the Israeli fighter nor the great sacrifices of the Israeli Army and people." On 8 September, Begin was quoted in an Israeli military magazine as accusing the American government of seeking to overthrow the Israeli government, proclaiming that "Our American friends must know that Israel is not Chile and I am not Allende."

In an early February 1983 speech to the Knesset, Begin reiterated his opposition to the Reagan Plan, saying that "one cannot freeze the settlements just as one cannot freeze life itself" and that "the only agreement signed was the Camp David agreement and this is the only agreement that should be negotiated." In early April 1983, Spokesperson for the United States Department of State John Hughes stated that the American government would "do our best to assure that the results of these negotiations are not prejudiced from the outset by activities of any party which reduce the prospects of a negotiated peace," specifically citing Israeli settlements, in an attempt to convince the Jordanian government to continue working on Reagan's Plan. In response, Israeli Minister of Defence Moshe Arens accused the US of trying "to dictate to another state its security requirements," while spokesperson for the Israeli Embassy in Washington Víctor Harel stated that "we will not accept any preconditions for negotiations from any party, including Jordan."

=== Arab League counter-proposal ===
The Arab League did not directly address the initiative but presented its own proposal in November 1982, the Fahd Plan, which conflicted with Reagan's proposal on key issues. Among the notable disagreements were the Palestinian right of return and the total dismantlement of settlements. The Israeli government rejected the Fahd Plan, stating that it contained "useless proposals" and "does not contain any substantial new elements that differ from traditional Arab positions." The Palestinian National Council, on the other hand, voted in favour of accepting the Fahd Plan.

=== Rejection by the PLO ===
PLO's chairman Yasser Arafat's initial public reactions in the days following Reagan's proposals was to say that "We do not reject them, nor do we criticize them. We are studying them." In the weeks following Reagan's speech, Arafat held several promising but ultimately inconclusive meetings with King Hussein of Jordan in which the King urged Arafat to accept Jordan's role as an intermediary, but with Arafat indicating that the PLO did not want Palestine to form a federation with Jordan unless first achieving independence as a state in its own right. Arafat also publicly criticised the Syrian government's immediate rejection of the plan. When he addressed a closed session of the Arab League summit in early September, Arafat indicated that Reagan's plan and the League's Fahd Plan could be used together as a starting point for negotiations, urging Arab states to take a "conciliatory attitude" towards the Reagan plan. PLO spokesperson Mahmoud Labadi stated in October 1982 that the PLO would "welcome the implemention of Reagan’s initiative," but would require an Israeli withdrawal from the occupied territories as a prerequisite for negotiations.

In the months that followed, the PLO leadership debated Reagan's proposals at length, but struggled significantly to maintain a public image of unity. Concerns were raised within the PLO that the Plan did not explicitly call for Palestinian independence, that agreeing to the plan could lead to assassination attempts from hardline Palestinian factions (such as the anti-PLO and Syrian-backed Abu Nidal Organization), and that the American government might not be prepared to truly pressure the Israeli government into following the plan (particularly after the Sabra and Shatila massacre in mid-September 1982, prior to which American officials had guaranteed the PLO that Palestinian civilians in Beirut would be protected if the PLO withdrew from the city). On the other hand, moderate voices within the PLO, notably Isam Sartawi, called for realism, warning that after the damage done to the PLO during the Lebanon War, the PLO was on the brink of total defeat. Moderates also argued that Arab states had proven themselves incapable of backing the Palestinian cause and that the increasing pace of Israeli settlement in the occupied territories risked the territories becoming de facto annexed by Israel.

In mid-October 1982, a statement claiming to represent five of the PLO factions (the Popular Front for the Liberation of Palestine, the Democratic Front for the Liberation of Palestine, the Palestinian Popular Struggle Front, the Palestinian Liberation Front, and the Popular Front for the Liberation of Palestine – General Command) was printed by Syrian Ba'ath Party newspaper Al-Ba'ath attacking Arafat for his meetings with King Hussein. In late November 1982, the Palestinian Central Council, one of the central bodies of the PLO, released a statement that accused the Plan of failing to "satisfy the inalienable national rights of our people," although without entirely rejecting the Plan and without ruling out the idea of mutual recognition between Israel and the PLO. That month, official PLO periodical Falastin Al Thawra asserted that "the confirmation of the legitimate rights of the Palestinian people contradicts the existence of the Zionist state." The Executive Committee of the Palestine Liberation Organization met in Aden in January 1983 to discuss the plan, however, four hardline factions (the PFLP, the DFLP, the Popular Struggle Front, and As-Sa'iqa) boycotted the meeting over Arafat's refusal to outright reject the Reagan proposal.

In February 1983, the Palestinian National Council (PNC) was finally convened in Algiers to discuss the Plan and determine the PLO's official stance, spending several days debating intensely. Radical factions within the PNC pushed to have the Council immediately and entirely reject the Plan, however, were defeated by moderates, who agreed to follow Arafat's line that the proposal was merely insufficient. Ultimately, the PNC chose to reject the Plan, but indicated that it might be willing to reconsider if the plan was reoworked to contain an explicit guarantee of the Palestinian right to self-determination. The PNC explained its decision in a statement: "The Reagan plan in substance does not satisfy the inalienable national rights of the Palestinian people as it denies them the right to self-determination and the establishment of an independent Palestinian state in Palestine. The Reagan plan also does not recognize the P.L.O. as the sole legitimate representative of the Palestinian people. This Reagan plan, which is in contradiction of international legality, is not acceptable to the P.N.C. as a sound basis for a just solution of the Palestine problem and the Arab-Israel conflict."

On 31 March 1983, at a rally marking Land Day in Damascus, Arafat stated that "There are quarters that wish the P.L.O. would say yes to the Reagan plan so they may say we are traitors. I say to all: no to the Reagan plan or the liquidation plans. If there is to be a solution it will be on the basis of the resolutions of the Fez summit." Arafat continued to pursue negotiations over the Reagan plan with King Hussein in early April 1983, but the two failed to reach an agreement.

== Reactions ==
=== In Israel ===
While Likud rejected Reagan's plan, it was welcomed by the Israeli Labor Party and the Peace Now movement. Labor leader Shimon Peres stated that "Mr. Begin always mocked us about our 'territorial compromise.' He would say, 'Where are your Jordanians?' Here, here are the Jordanians. They are willing to discuss a plan that is not exactly theirs, and it is not exactly ours. I believe that in the West Bank there is an alternative: either the P.L.O. or Jordan. Since I negate the P.L.O., I favor linkage with Jordan, as outlined in this plan." Hadash MK Charlie Biton called for "Israel, encouraged by the United States, to begin direct negotiations with the leaders of the PLO at once so that the right of the Palestinian people to self determination may be resolved in justice and through discussions."

=== In Palestine ===
Palestinian Village Leagues leader Mustafa Dodin spoke in support of the Reagan plan, warning that Palestinians needed to "hurry and start the negotiations. If we delay a few years all of the area will be covered with settlements and it will be too late."

=== In the United States ===
Executive director of the American Israel Public Affairs Committee Tom Dine spoke favourably of Reagan's plan, saying that it contained "many constructive points," particularly citing that "part of the effort is to bring Jordan into the peace process. Jordan is the missing link in the negotiations, and I think President Reagan and Secretary of State Shultz can bring them in." Julius Berman of the Conference of Presidents of Major American Jewish Organizations stated that the plan "does violence to the spirit of Camp David because it substitutes a specific American plan for the free give-and-take that is essential if the parties to the dispute are to resolve their differences." Zionist Organization of America president Ivan Novick accused Reagan's administration of failing to recognise that "Arab intransigence, Arab hostility, Arab inability and failure to be flexible, and Arab refusal to accept and recognize Israel" was the main obstacle to peace in the Middle East.

Jimmy Carter, Reagan's predecessor as American president, stated that "there is absolutely nothing in the President's speech last night which is contrary to either the letter or spirit of the Camp David agreement," with Carter's National Security Advisor Zbigniew Brzezinski stating that the plan was "fully consistent with the spirit and the letter of Camp David. And I know, because I was there." In February 1983, Carter and his predecessor, Gerald Ford, co-authored an article in Reader's Digest in support of the plan, while warning the Israeli government that "however it may define its intentions in the West Bank or Gaza, however it may seek to rationalize its actions there, the evidence is convincing to the Arab world and beyond that the Israeli leaders have simply chosen to seize these lands, and hold them by force." Alexander Haig, Reagan's former Secretary of State, on the other hand, criticised the plan as "a very serious mistake," saying that neither the US nor Israel would be better off "to have an enclave established on the West Bank which is susceptible to manipulation by foreign powers."

=== Internationally ===
The European Economic Community called for the PLO to support Reagan's Plan, while reaffirming its 1980 Venice Declaration that called for the PLO to be directly involved in any peace negotiations. British Foreign Secretary Francis Pym stated that "I have to say that I was disappointed by the Israeli reaction to President Reagan’s proposals. Mr. Begin does not accept them even as a basis for discussion," but added that "Only Israel can decide what is in her own security interests. She is right to test all peace proposals under this essential criterion." Pym later claimed that "some of the thinking behind the Reagan plan originated" in the British Foreign Office.

Chancellor of Austria Bruno Kreisky described Reagan's plan as a "step forward," saying that while the Camp David Accords were important for peace between Israel and Egypt, they were ultimately "not for the solution of the Palestinian problem." Leader of the Soviet Union Leonid Brezhnev described the plan as "basically vicious," arguing that any Israeli-Palestinian peace plan needed to be founded on the establishment of an independent Palestinian state led by the PLO.

== Analysis ==
=== Contemporary assessments ===
David Friedman of the Jewish Telegraphic Agency wrote in September 1982 that Reagan's plan was "squarely aimed at getting the Palestinians and the Arab states to join the autonomy talks which up to now included only Israel, Egypt and the United States," noting that Arab states would be pleased that the American government was moving towards more actively putting pressure on the Israeli government to reach a peace deal and that the plan was part of the American's government's attempts to distance itself from the Israeli invasion of Lebanon. British newspaper The Economist wrote in February 1983 that "for the first time, an American president put his weight behind an idea for solving the Palestinian question as distinct from the Arab-Israeli one," but warned that "if the Reagan initiative disappears into the sands of the campaign, it will be damingly dismissed as well-intentioned but feeble."

Israeli Reuters journalist Arik Bachar wrote in September 1982 that "for Israel, the apparent shift in American Middle East policy represents the most disturbing development for years," adding that although the Israeli campaign in Lebanon had significantly damaged the PLO militarily, it had only led to increased nationalist sentiment among the populations of the West Bank and Gaza.

Matti Steinberg of The Harry S. Truman Research Institute for the Advancement of Peace wrote in February 1983 that the Palestinian National Council's endorsement of the Fahd Plan and qualified rejection of the Reagan Plan represented "the first time that the PLO openly adopted a plan which means a political settlement with Israel. For the first time the PLO says that in order to get a piece of Palestine it is willing to reach some kind of a settlement, albeit unacceptable by Israel." British-Canadian Middle East expert Gwynne Dyer wrote in January 1983 that even if "Arafat is clearly now willing to fall in with the American plan if Washington will then put enough pressure on Israel to make it disgorge the occupied territories eventually," the PNC had yet to convene to discuss the plan "because the PLO cannot muster enough unity to justify calling it together," warning that "time is working against the prospect of peace, and the world will not wait forever for the PLO to make its mind up."

=== Historical assessments ===
According to Israeli historian Shlomo Ben-Ami in 2007, Reagan's Plan served as a signal to the Likud leadership, that the United States would not allow the Lebanon War to serve as a prelude to the annexation of the West Bank by Israel.

Jacob Høigilt of the Fafo Foundation wrote in 2013 that "a sense of standstill and loss of direction in the political process" during the 1980s helped spark the First Intifada in 1987, as "Israel had no clear idea of what to do with the occupied territories, and resorted to day-to-day military management of them. The political process was non-existent, the Reagan plan of Palestinian autonomy in association with Jordan having been rejected first by Israel, then by the Palestinian National Council in 1982."

== See also ==
- Fahd Plan
- Israeli–Palestinian peace process

== Works cited ==
- Aruri, Naseer H.; Moughrabi, Fouad M. (1983). "The Reagan Middle East Initiative". Journal of Palestine Studies. 12 (2): 10–30. doi:10.2307/2536411. JSTOR 2536411.
- Christison, Kathleen (1999). Perceptions of Palestine: Their Influence on U.S. Middle East Policy. University of California Press. ISBN 978-0-520-21717-1.
- Rubin, Barry M.; Rubin, Judith Colp (2003). Yasir Arafat: a political biography. Oxford University Press. ISBN 978-0195166897.
- Ben-Ami, Shlomo (2007). Scars of war, wounds of peace: the Israeli-Arab tragedy. Oxford University Press. ISBN 978-0195325423.
