= Break-their-bones policy =

1988 Israeli deterrence policy

"Force, might, and beatings" was the stated policy of Israeli Minister of Defence Yitzhak Rabin to suppress the Palestinian First Intifada in early 1988.

After the first weeks of rioting coalesced into a popular uprising and the Israeli government became increasingly concerned over the Palestinian casualties at the hands of live ammunition, in early January 1988 Rabin adopted a policy of beatings with the aim of restoring order and re-establishing the authority of the Israeli Civil Administration, while minimising Palestinian deaths. The policy was quickly met with a widespread international backlash, particularly due to media reports of Israel Defence Forces (IDF) soldiers beating unarmed protestors. Domestic concerns over the policy also grew in Israel, both over the legality of the policy and the effects it had on Israeli soldiers, and the Israeli government formally retreated from the policy by the end of February 1988. The policy has been referred to by some commentators as the "break-their-bones" policy due to unproven allegations from Palestinians and some Israeli soldiers that Rabin personally ordered soldiers to break the bones of Palestinian protestors.

== Background ==
Yitzhak Rabin was an Israeli soldier and politician. During the 1940s, he joined the Palmach paramilitary, participating in World War II and the Jewish insurgency in Mandatory Palestine. He then participated in the 1948 Arab–Israeli War, where he served as deputy commander of Operation Dani, personally signing the order for the Palestinian expulsion from Lydda and Ramle. He also served as Chief of Staff of the Israel Defence Forces during the Six-Day War, following which Israel occupied the West Bank and Gaza Strip. In 1973, he was elected to the Knesset as a member of the Israeli Labor Party, quickly becoming party leader and Prime Minister in 1974. In 1977, Likud won the Israeli elections for the first time, and Rabin lost the Labor leadership to Shimon Peres. He would return to government, however in 1984, being named Minister of Defence as part of a grand coalition between Likud and Labor. As Minister of Defence, he oversaw the implementation of an "iron fist" policy in the occupied Palestinian territories, significantly increasing measures to repress Palestinian nationalism.

== History ==
=== Outbreak of the First Intifada ===
On 9 December 1987, an Israeli truck driver collided with and killed four Palestinians in the Jabalia refugee camp. The incident sparked the largest wave of Palestinian unrest since the Israeli occupation began in 1967: the First Intifada. During the early stages, the Intifada was largely characterised by a non-violent campaign, with actions including labour strikes, tax strikes, boycotts of Israeli goods, boycotts of Israeli institutions, demonstrations, the establishment of underground classrooms and cooperatives, raisings of the banned Palestinian flag, and civil disobedience. The actions were led by the led by a decentralised leadership composed of the grassroots organisations of the PLO, such as labour unions, student councils, and women's committees, who organised themselves into the Unified National Leadership of the Uprising (UNLU), mainly outside of the direct control of the PLO leadership, who were mostly in exile or imprisoned (or had been killed by Israeli forces over the preceding years).

The outbreak of the Intifada caught the Israeli government by surprise, with the government finding itself unprepared to deal with a popular uprising. During the first days of the unrest, Rabin was on an official visit to the United States to negotiate a military pact that would grant Israel many of the same rights regarding American military contracts as NATO members and the purchase of additional F-16 Fighting Falcon fighter jets for the Israeli military to replace the cancelled IAI Lavi programme. Failing to recognise that the unrest was transforming into a popular uprising, Rabin refused to cut short the trip. At the end of his trip, before returning to Israel, Rabin told the media when questioned over the unrest that he was "sorry about the loss of life of anyone," but that the Israeli government "will use what ever is needed" to prevent violent demonstrations and reiterated the government's policy of refusing to recognise the PLO.

As the Israeli government struggled to formulate a consistent response to the uprising as grew through December 1987, it defaulted to its usual measures of suppressing Palestinian nationalism. This was the Iron Fist policy, including imposing widespread lockdowns on Palestinian cities, shutting down Palestinian schools and universities, mass arrests, and demolitions of Palestinian houses. Between the outbreak of the Intifada and 15 January 1988, 38 Palestinians were killed by Israeli gunfire.

=== Officially stated policy ===
Over the days of 4 to 5 January 1988, the Israeli government settled on a more consistent policy for suppressing the Intifada, including significantly increasing the number of soldiers patrolling the territories, more actively confronting demonstrations, and using beatings to disperse those protests instead of live ammunition, without announcing the policy. Several days later, Rabin stated after visiting the Gaza Strip that the Israeli government was "still in the process of making all efforts to make sure that tranquility will be restored. We'll achieve it, but it's not going to be achieved by one or two days," warning that "I hope the people of the Gaza Strip will realize that the longer the disturbances will be continued, the greater will be their suffering."

On 19 January 1988, Rabin publicly confirmed that the Israeli government's policy was to beat Palestinian protestors, as part of a speech announcing a new range of measures to suppress the Palestinian uprising, including granting Israeli emergency powers over East Jerusalem, despite the Israeli government having annexed the city and considering it part of Israel proper, and banning food shipments into refugee camps in the occupied Palestinian territories until Palestinian shopkeepers stop holding commercial strikes. In his speech, Rabin stated that "the first priority is to use force, might, beatings." Israeli Prime Minister Yitzhak Shamir told a meeting of Likud's Herut faction several days later that the Israeli government's goal was to "put the fear of death into the Arabs of the territories." The Jerusalem Post quoted a senior Israeli military official as saying that the policy was aimed towards "striking fear of the army" into Palestinian protestors, and another told Haaretz that the policy's aim was to make Palestinians "scared of the army, and so that one day we could get most of the units out of the territory, when people will remember and know for the future."

Both men and women were targeted by beatings, particularly those living in refugee camps (which were frequently closed off to journalists). Many of the beatings took place at night. Jennifer Leaning of Physicians for Human Rights described "a systematic pattern of limb injury that is clearly organized to cause fractures that will not result in mortality... a pattern that is controlled, a systematic pattern over a wide geographical area. It's as if they've been instructed. The injuries could be far worse." According to Joseph Farag of the University of Minnesota, "so severe, frequent, and regular was the beating of Palestinians that the Israeli military replaced its soldiers' wooden truncheons, which had a habit of breaking and splintering, with more resilient plastic and fiberglass ones in March of 1988." Many Palestinians who had been beaten did not seek formal medical treatment afterwards, out of fear that their medical records would be used to arrest them again, leading to an outbreak of wound infections across the Palestinian territories.

By late January, however, faced with a growing domestic and international backlash against the policy, as well as with growing concerns within the Israeli military about the psychological effects of the policy on its soldiers and about the legality of the policy, some members of the Israeli government began to moderate some of its public statements on the use of beatings, while other officials denied that beatings were taking place. On 26 January, Rabin stated that "there shouldn’t be blows for the sake of blows," but claimed that the policy had helped the IDF regain its deterrent power and that reports of peaceful Palestinians being beaten were exceptions. Minister of Police Haim Bar-Lev claimed that "is no beating," describing the policy as "an unfortunate term." Central Command head Major General Amram Mitzna stated that reports of beatings were "a lot of stories which are just stories," saying that "we the Israelis, the Jews, have a very sensitive conscience."

By 22 February, at least 59 Palestinians had been killed as a result of the Israeli crackdown on the Intifada, with thousands having been beaten and suffering bone fractures. That day, a letter sent by Attorney General of Israel Yosef Harish to the government was made public, in which Harish warned that orders to use force to punish or humiliate protestors would be illegal and that the growing number of reports of beatings raised suspicions that they were not exceptions. Chief of the General Staff Dan Shomron issued a new order to Israeli soldiers saying that the use of force was permissible to break up a riot, to overcome resistance to an arrest, and while pursuing suspects, but not as a means of punishment or after the objective had been attained. The Israeli military further ordered that all soldiers serving under Central Command should sign statements confirming that they had read and understood the order on the use of force.

=== Continued beatings throughout the First Intifada ===
According to Palestinian human rights organisations Al-Haq, "although official sanctioning of the beatings policy was withdrawn in February, in practice the beatings did not stop... The main differences are that seems to be that the policy is less systemic - i.e. there is less emphasis on breaking limbs - and certainly less visible to the international community, partly as a result of restrictions on the media, and partly because the main targets are remote villages and refugee camps, especially in the Gaza Strip."

Israeli newspaper Maariv reported in early March 1988 that the Israeli military had decided to only prosecute the most excessive cases of soldiers violating the order on the use of force. George D. Moffett III of The Christian Science Monitor wrote in February 1989 that "no soldier convicted for the use of excessive force, including fatal force, has received a sentence of more than 18 months. By comparison, Palestinians found guilty of throwing stones often are jailed for two years or more." In its 1989 end-of-year report, Human Rights Watch noted that "as of October 10, 1989, indictments had been returned in only 13 cases of deaths by shooting or beating since the start of the intifada. The stiffest sentence given so far in these cases was two years' imprisonment. As the country report stated, 'regulations were not rigorously enforced; punishments were usually lenient; and there were many cases of unjustified killing which did not result in disciplinary actions or prosecutions.'"

In September 1988, The Jerusalem Post reported that "the number of people requiring medical treatment for beatings has increased recently," saying that "beatings seem to have become a daily feature in the Gaza District." In May 1990, Rädda Barnen released a report claiming that "23,600 to 29,900 children required medical treatment for their beating injuries in the first two years of the intifada," with around one third of those being children under the age of ten.

== High-profile incidents ==
=== CBS footage controversy ===
On 25 February 1988, Wael Joudeh and Osamah Joudeh, two teenage Palestinians shepherds and cousins, ran into a patrol of four Duchifat Battalion soldiers as they tended to their sheep in the hills near Nablus. The patrol accosted the two and began to beat them. Shay Fogelman of Haaretz described: "All of them kick the teens vigorously. At least two of the soldiers take big rocks and mercilessly smash them against the two cousins. At one point a soldier holds one of the teen's arms as another soldier savagely hits it repeatedly with a large rock. The soldiers do not seem to be in any danger, nor do they seem disturbed by the events. They are utterly focused on meting out the beating." The soldiers subsequently placed the two under detention, taking them to al-Fara'a Prison.

Unknown to the soldiers and the two cousins, the beating was captured on camera by a television crew working for American network CBS, in the area to film demonstrations happening that day in Nablus, and subsequently broadcast on television news networks around the globe. The footage sparked widespread controversy in Israel, among journalists, and abroad, including sparking protests internationally.

Further controversy was sparked in Israel after only an edited version of the footage was shown. Israel Broadcasting Authority (IBA) head Uri Porat reviewed the footage with IBA news director Yair Stern and editor Yael Chen. Together, they came to the decision not to allow the footage to air entirely, saying that it contained "horrors that needn't be broadcast on television." Porat later defended the decision by saying that "you have to keep a sense of proportion. You don't have to indulge in overkilling and overdoing, like the American television."

In the days following, Prime Minister Yitzhak Shamir announced that the government would consider completely banning television cameras in the occupied territories. Shamir stated that "Nations that didn't open their mouths when we were brought to the slaughter are now going crazy at the sight of rioters getting their punishment. It is difficult to understand the injustice and the lack of proportion in these responses. It's nothing but the fact that they like to see us beaten and knocked down and hate to see us defending our country with strength, forcefully and remaining alive." Brigadier General Ephraim Lapid stated that the IDF would be opposed to such a ban, out of concern that it would allow the PLO to control the media narrative, and stated that "The foreign correspondents appreciate our intentions and comply with the army’s instructions. But the balance is upset by the Israeli cameramen. It is these Israeli cameramen who provoke our soldiers. They pay no attention to the orders of the officers in charge of a sector. Because of the way the cameramen behave, they spark off incidents whose coverage is out of all proportion to their significance."

IDF Central Command head Amram Mitzna summoned the field commanders under him to review the footage. Mitzna then chose to release the four soldiers from military detention while prosecutors debated whether to press charges or not. The soldiers who had participated in the beating claimed that they had simply been following orders, saying that Rabin and their direct commanders had told them to "break arms and legs." The soldiers were ultimately brought to trial, receiving short custodial sentences and being allowed to return to military service on condition of not being deployed to the occupied Palestinian territories.

=== Givati Trials ===
There were two high-profile cases of beatings involving soldiers of the Givati Brigade. The First Givati Trial saw three soldiers arrested after an incident in which they beat a man in Gaza to death after the man attempted to stop the soldiers from arresting his son. An attorney representing the soldiers in their trial claimed that "Official policy is based on written orders. What we're seeing is that the oral orders are different. The soldiers acted according to an order that goes all the way up the chain of command to the top levels of the IDF." The soldiers were convicted, ultimately sentenced to six months incarceration and being banned from returning to the Brigade.

The Second Givati Trial saw three senior officers in the Brigade arrested after an incident in which soldiers under their command arrested two Palestinians in their homes in the Bureij refugee camp and took the Palestinians into a nearby olive grove to beat them, resulting in the death of one of the Palestinians. One of the officers in the Second Trial testified that soldiers routinely "catch the people, give them their dose, and then let them go."

=== Yehuda Meir case ===
On 21 and 22 January 1988, significant controversy was sparked after a unit of soldiers was broke the arms and legs of 20 handcuffed Palestinians in the villages of Huwara and Beita, Nablus. As a result of the controversy, the unit's commander, Lieutenant Colonel Yehuda Meir, was reprimanded in May 1989 and eventually placed on paid leave in November 1989. Meir defended himself by claiming that "the whole army functioned by the same norms."

Although the IDF initially decided not to pursue a court martial against Meir, the Association for Civil Rights in Israel successfully sued to the Supreme Court of Israel to have Meir placed on trial. Meir's trial opened in late March 1990, making him the highest-ranking Israeli soldier to be prosecuted since the start of the Intifada. Meir pleaded not guilty, saying that he had acted on orders from above. Meir named Rabin, Chief of Staff Dan Shomron, and Central Command head Amram Mitzna of having issued the "permission to beat," and claimed that while the military's official written records only contained discussions about restricting beatings to violent demonstrators, unofficial orders permitting beatings against non-violent demonstrations had been issued orally. He specifically claimed that Rabin had personally told him to "Go in and break their bones. If they will be beaten, it will hurt them, and the demonstrations will stop... You do the work. I’ll take care of the media," and that Brigadier General Ze'ev Livne had routinely asked officers each evening how many bones their units had broken that day. Rabin denied having issued such orders, saying that soldiers had been ordered to storm rioters, "beating them with fists and batons, not to punish them but to hurt them and force them to cease their assault."

A number of the soldiers involved in the affair testified during the trial. An intelligence officer associated with the case testified that Meir had been sent to round up a number of Palestinians suspected of "political activity," namely having participated in demonstrations, however denied that Livne and Mitzna had ordered the detainees to be beaten. Lieutenant Omri Kochva testified that the detainees "were divided into two groups. We got them off the bus - bound. We laid them on the ground, among the olive trees, and broke [their] hands and legs. The emphasis was on doing that quickly, under an officer’s supervision... Most of them stopped screaming after 15 to 20 seconds." Lieutenant Ziv Gefen testified that he had misleading claimed in an earlier report that the detainees had not been beaten badly because "it was easier for me personally not to be nearby, to look the other way," further testifying that frustrations among the soldiers had been high because "we had the feeling that [the Palestinian villagers] were allowed to do whatever thay wanted," that Livne had told the soldiers that their actions were connected to government policy, and that while breaking bones was a commonly used term, it was more symbolic than a direct order. Lieutenant Eldad Ben-Moshe testified that Meir had told him that the order was necessary "because the detention camps are full," and that Livne had told him to follow Meir's orders, saying that "I am satisfied that, under the circumstances, I could not have refused to obey the order, even if such an idea had occurred to me. I felt that, in accordance with my abilities, I did all that I could," but that while "we arrested, we beat, and we even beat for the sake of beating. Today it would be hard for me to obey the order." Captain Victor Sudhai testified that Rabin told him "I want you to catch stone-throwers and break their arms and legs, but not their heads."

Meir's wife, Orna Meir, as well as the wives of several other IDF officers petitioned the Israeli government during Meir's trial to open an inquiry in Rabin, saying that "we point at the defense minister as an element responsible for giving explicit and unequivocal orders... All those who acted in the period of the beatings in January to February 1988 acted on orders. It cannot be that so many soldiers and officers deviated from orders. This was the method." The Knesset voted against opening an inquiry in July 1990.

In early April 1991, the military tribunal found Meir guilty, ruling that "we have not been convinced that the order to beat bound men rounded up from their homes came from anyone but the defendant" and that if Meir had received such orders, he would have been "obligated to resist them because the orders were patently illegal." Meir was stripped of his rank as an officer and discharged from the IDF, but was not sentenced to any incarceration.

Meir has continued to accuse Rabin following his trial. In 2018, he told The Jerusalem Post that "Rabin visited a number of locations in the territories and asked us what we’d been doing. When we didn’t reply, he told us, ‘Break their bones.’ Unfortunately, I took his words at face value and we began beating demonstrators in order to disperse the crowds. When I was put on trial, neither Rabin nor Shomron backed me up. The military advocate Amnon Straschnov handed me over on a platter to the Left. My rank was lowered from colonel to private. I was thrown out of the army and on top of all that I also lost my pension. It was the first trial from the intifada, and the IDF and the State of Israel paid a high price. After that, we had no chance of putting an end to the uprising."

== Reactions ==
=== In Palestine ===
UNRWA acting director in the Gaza Strip Angela Williams stated that "we are deeply shocked by the evidence of the brutality with which people are evidently being beaten."

=== In Israel ===
John Kifner of The New York Times reported on 26 January 1988 that public dissent against the policy was increasing, but still remaining relatively small, "largely because national security is perceived to be at stake and because the army enjoys wide support among Israelis in defending it. Some Israelis have taken to the streets in dissent, but even some Israelis who say they are appalled at what is going on see little alternative." President of Israel Chaim Herzog stated in response to criticisms of the policy: "The question that I must ask you is, what do you see as the alternative? If you criticize our methods of achieving law and order, as many in Israel do, you should at least advise us what the alternative is," adding that "there certainly was no order to beat indiscriminately."

Former Minister of Foreign Affairs Abba Eban claimed that "Israel has never been stronger, more secure against external assault. The major peril that faces us comes from within ourselves," saying that "we have come to a very low point when the image of Israel — albeit not totally accurate — is that of a club being wielded by an Israeli soldier, face-to-face with a Palestinian civilian." Ratz MK Yossi Sarid stated that "when you see a man of 75 years old and he is very, very severely beaten, you necessarily come to the conclusion that you are not talking about self-defense." Abdulwahab Darawshe, the only Arab citizen of Israel who was an MK for the Labor Party, quit the party in protest over the policy. Omer Bartov of Tel Aviv University wrote a letter to Rabin warning of the effects the policy might have on the IDF, comparing the policy to the radicalisation of the Wehrmacht under Nazi Germany in the 1930s.

Peace Now organised several demonstrations in cities in Israel against the policy, some of which saw crowds of tens of thousands of people.

=== Internationally ===
The policy was met with a significant backlash among international audiences, particularly as some of the beatings were filmed by international journalists and shown on television news around the world. According to author Michael Scott-Baumann, "beatings and other punishments meted out to men, women, and children were shown on television screens around the world... The world saw a powerful, modern army let loose against civilians fighting for their human rights and the right to self-governance." Audrey Kurth Cronin of Carnegie Mellon University has described the policy as "a public relations disaster that offered up global images of IDF soldiers beating adolescent rioters with clubs."

The International Committee of the Red Cross called for the Israeli government to "bring to an immediate end these serious acts perpetrated against civilians," warning that "thousands of people have been the victims of brutality and ill-treatment at the hands of Israeli soldiers." Amnesty International stated that it was "very concerned by the extent and seriousness of beatings which have been taking place in the context of the security forces dealing with the disturbances, the beatings which appear, in many cases, to have been either punitive or deterrent."

Spokesperson for the United States Department of State Charles E. Redman stated that the American government was "disturbed by the adoption of a policy by the government of Israel that calls for beatings as a means to restore or maintain order," calling for both Israelis and Palestinians to maintain order in the occupied territories without violence. Norwegian ambassador to Israel Torleiv Anda sparked controversy after comparing the policy to the German occupation of Norway, ultimately issuing an apology for his remark.

The policy sparked significant controversy among the Jewish community in the United States. New York Times executive editor A. M. Rosenthal argued that "if not fully and publicly renounced, the policy of trying to beat the demonstrations down with fist and club can break not only Palestinian bones but Israel's respect in the world and in herself," saying that "what has been taking place these past weeks is also an insult to Jewish history." Union of American Hebrew Congregations president Alexander M. Schindler described the policy as "an offense to the Jewish spirit," while Hyman Bookbinder of the American Jewish Committee stated that the policy "has caused great chagrin, great dismay among [Israel's] best Jewish supporters." The Conference of Presidents of Major American Jewish Organizations, on the other hand, spoke in support of Rabin, saying that the "use of force is sometimes indispensable to restore order."

== Assessments ==
=== Effects on the First Intifada ===
According to Brent E Sasley of the University of Texas at Arlington, "Rabin’s “break their bones” instructions regarding Palestinian protesters and rioters in the First Intifada helped legitimize a harsh Israeli response to civilian rallies against the occupation."

According to Efraim Inbar of Bar-Ilan University, "the new policy failed to achieve its main goal of ending the mass demonstrations." According to Avi Kober of the Begin–Sadat Center for Strategic Studies, "Rabin's beating policy during the initial stages of the Intifada had two purposes: compel the Palestinians to stop the struggle, and deter them from employing both violent and non-violent methods by punishment. The beating policy failed, though, as popular uprising and civil disobedience could not be coped with in regular methods."

=== Effects on Palestinian society ===
According to Amahl Bishara of Tufts University, "during the First Intifada, beatings and imprisonment were akin to rites of passage, as they symbolically transformed boys into men and generated respect from the community." According to French researcher Stéphanie Latte Abdallah, the reconstruing of beatings into rites of passage allowed Palestinian boys to attest to their "maturity, moral superiority, their capacity to resist, and their virility," while noting that those rites of passage occurred outside of the family, creating "an individual experience inside a community of young men that disrupts family relations by encouraging a transfer of power from the parents and elders - who could not protect them from the violence of the occupation - to these young men."

=== Effects on Israeli soldiers ===
The Israeli military expressed internal concerns about the psychological effects the policy would have on its soldiers, deploying military psychologists into the field wth units sent to crackdown on the Intifada. According to Yoel Elizur of the Hebrew University of Jerusalem, who has supervised research into the psychology of Israeli soldiers during the Intifada: "Moral injury occurs when soldiers act against their moral values and beliefs or participate as bystanders. Those injured in this way experience guilt and shame, and are prone to depression, anxiety and suicidal impulses... Israeli society views the IDF as a moral army. The discussion of atrocities evokes emotional resistance even though it is intellectually understood that crimes exist in every civilized society and that war crimes have been committed by soldiers in every army."

Haaretz journalist Ze'ev Schiff wrote in January 1988 that Israeli soldiers were exhibiting "increasingly extreme opinions and feelings together with rage at the Arab population and a desire to disturb them." Ron Ben-Yishai of Yedioth Ahronoth quoted an Israeli regimental commander as saying restrictions on the full use of force against Palestinian protestors made the soldiers under his command feel "humiliated; it makes them bitter," saying that his soldiers "come in here with a clear opinion: we are not beating, we are not shooting. But after what happens in Gaza, they are beating already. You should never see such beating. I personally can't hit anyone. It's hard for me. It's an absurd situation for a commander to give an order he himself can't carry out. Here you tell them to beat, and sometimes afterward you have to turn your back." In a mid-March 1988 interview, Rabin stated that Israeli soldiers suppressing the uprising "have had to come to terms with combat at the closest possible quarters, come face to face with hatred. If you were to quiz the soldiers, the overwhelming majority would prefer to shoot from a distance of 50 metres rather than get involved in beatings. At that distance you can ignore a man’s face, his eyes... It’s certainly not an easy experience. But I believe that by and large, the soldiers know why they are doing it. But to say that they like doing it..."

=== Factors in Rabin's decision-making ===
Efraim Inbar of Bar-Ilan University has written that Rabin "was generally accepted as an authority on security matters. The political constellation of the late 1980s allowed him to be the final arbiter in affairs pertaining to the IDF, its use in the territories and outside it, with little interference from other cabinet members. His perceptions of the situation and his prescriptions constituted the most influential input in forming the Israeli response to the intifada." According to Inbar, Rabin "regarded Israel as being engaged in a protracted conflict over its very existence in the Middle East," and therefore, "Israeli military might was a necessary precondition for survival in a hostile environment." According to Yael S. Aronoff of Michigan State University, "Rabin was considered a hawk within the Labor Party," saying that "many of his positions on national security issues were respected by the rival Likud party."

=== Effects on Rabin's legacy ===
Rabin's personal legacy has largely been defined by the Oslo Accords, which he signed with PLO chair Yasser Arafat in 1993, earning them both the Nobel Peace Prize, and because of which he was assassinated by an Israeli far-right extremist in 1995. In its obituary for Rabin, British newspaper The Independent described him as "the least predictable of peacemakers." Yael S. Aronoff of Michigan State University has written that Rabin represents "one of the most dramatic examples of a hawk turning into a dove... From 1984 to 1990, he was known for cracking down on the intifada through force. Thousands of Peace Now activists demonstrated to demand Rabins resignation. Yet only five years later, this same man reluctantly shook the hand of his mortal enemy, Yasir Arafat."

Some commentators, however, have argued that Rabin's legacy as a peacemaker should be re-evaluated to place more emphasis on his "force, might, and beatings" policy. Seth J. Frantzman of The Jerusalem Post argued in 2015 that "if Netanyahu said the same today he’d be called a radical right-wing racist. Beatings were Rabin’s solution to stone throwing, not arrests, just beatings and brute force." Amjad Iraqi of +972 Magazine argued in September 2020 that while the Oslo Accords were "indeed daring," Rabin's "persona as a 'warrior-turned-peacemaker' is almost exclusively centered on the final four years of his life, five decades of which were defined by hawkish and militaristic views." Turkish researcher Burak Elmali argued in 2024 that "despite the West whitewashing his image and giving him the Nobel Peace Prize for their efforts, we remember him for who he was and what he did: Yitzhak Rabin was the architect of a vicious strategy that inflicted as much suffering on the Palestinian people as possible."

== See also ==
- Israeli torture in the occupied territories
