= Israeli responses to the First Intifada =

The First Intifada, a mass Palestinian uprising against the Israeli occupation of the Palestinian territories between 1987 and 1993, had a wide-ranging impact within Israel. The Israeli government acted at first to forcibly suppress the Intifada, before later moving towards a strategy that placed more emphasis on de-escalation and eventually engaging in direct peace negotiations with Palestinians for the first time. The Israeli military's reputation was widely seen, both domestically and internationally, to be diminished as a result of its role in suppressing the Intifada. Within Israeli civil society, the impact of the First Intifada included the creation of new Arab minority political parties, as well as a surge in feminist peace activism.

== Background ==
On 9 December 1987, an Israeli truck driver collided with and killed four Palestinians in the Jabalia refugee camp. The incident sparked the largest wave of Palestinian unrest since the Israeli occupation began in 1967: the First Intifada. During the early stages, the Intifada was largely characterised by a non-violent campaign led by a decentralised, grassroots leadership, with actions including labour strikes, tax strikes, boycotts of Israeli goods, boycotts of Israeli institutions, demonstrations, the establishment of underground classrooms and cooperatives, raisings of the banned Palestinian flag, and civil disobedience. The Israeli government responded to the breakout of the Intifada with a harsh crackdown, however, and the Intifada grew more violent during its last stages, including Palestinian internal political violence against rumoured collaborators. By the end of the Intifada, over a thousand Palestinians had been killed and over a hundred thousand injured by Israeli forces, with around two hundred Israelis having been killed by Palestinians. The First Intifada would come to an end with several high-profile peace negotiations, including the Madrid Conference of 1991 and the 1993 Oslo Accords.

== Suppression of the Intifada ==
The Israeli government reacted harshly to the outbreak of the Intifada, enacting a range of strict measures and an iron fist policy to try and suppress it. The Jewish Telegraphic Agency wrote in 1988 that these measures included "curfews, widespread preventive arrests, sealing off the territories from Israel proper, banning freedom of movement within the territories, cutting telephone lines and removing loudspeakers from the minarets of mosques." Efrat Silber of the Ben-Gurion University of the Negev wrote in 2010 that the Israeli government "limited travel, closed educational institutions, detained suspects, demolished and seized houses, deported activists outside the borders of Israel, and used targeted killings." Measures taken by the Israeli frequently fell under the legal framework of the Defence (Emergency) Regulations, a framework leftover from British rule in Mandatory Palestine.

Efraim Inbar of Bar-Ilan University categorised the Israeli government's response to the Intifada in four chronological stages. In the first stage, during the first month of the uprising, the Israeli government was caught off guard and attempted to use the same measures it had previously used to suppress waves of Palestinian unrest. In the second stage, during the first months of 1988, the Israeli government saw the uprising as presenting a serious threat that it would be pushed out of the Palestinian Territories, and the Israeli government moved to violently suppress demonstrations. In the third stage, from mid 1988 to the collapse of the Israeli unity government in spring 1990, the Israeli government halted further military escalation and focused on a strategyof attrition instead, particularly through economic pressure and mass arrests of Palestinians. In the fourth stage, under new Minister of Defence Moshe Arens, was marked by de-escalation and withdrawal of Israeli soldiers from the main Palestinian population centres.

=== Use of force ===
When the First Intifada broke out, Minister of Defence Yitzhak Rabin pledged to use "force, might, and beatings" to suppress the Intifada, while ordering Israeli soldiers to break the bones of Palestinian protestors. Prime Minister of Israel Yitzhak Shamir pledged that the Israeli government would "put the fear of death into the Arabs of the Territories." In early 1988, IDF Central Command head Amram Mitzna claimed that "the use of force to disperse demonstrations has proved itself," saying that when the military dispersed demonstrations, "we will grab whom we can and some of them will be beaten. They'll have to understand that they can't get up at 9 or 10 A.M. and make stone-throwing and tire-burning their national sport and expect no consequences." In October 1988, Rabin stated that "mass demonstrations, which were the symbol of the uprising, no longer exist, because the army has instructions to suppress them as they develop," adding that the Israeli military "must exercise force in the territories, the maximum force permitted by law, to face those inciters."

The Israeli use of force, however, faced widespread international criticism. Jennifer Leaning of Physicians for Human Rights stated in February 1988 that there was "a systematic pattern of limb injury that is clearly organized to cause fractures that will not result in mortality" among injured protestors, saying that "patients look as if they had been put through a washing machine ringer. They would have had to hold them down and just keep beating them." In a 1989 report, Amnesty International accused the Israeli government of using "excessive and indiscriminate force" against protesting Palestinians. A 1990 report by Human Rights Watch argued that "Israeli policies all too often encouraged a lack of restraint by IDF troops" in responding to the Intifada, including "orders authorizing relatively liberal use of lethal force," a "failure to vigorously investigate and prosecute" cases of potential misconduct by soldiers, and blocking access to independent, third party observers.

=== Curfews ===
Throughout the Intifada, the Israeli military would regularly impose curfews and lockdowns on Palestinian cities and regions, confining residents to their homes, sometimes for several consecutive days. In late January 1988, a curfew was imposed on the At-Tur neighbourhood, marking the first curfew to be imposed in Jerusalem since the beginning of the Israeli occupation in 1967. In another high profile case, in September 1989, the Israeli military imposed a full blockade on the West Bank town of Beit Sahour to try and suppress a comprehensive tax strike undertaken by the town's residents. The blockade lasted forty-two days.

=== School closures ===
In response to the Intifada, the Israeli military ordered a significant number of Palestinian primary and secondary schools closed for prolonged periods, including public schools and UNRWA-run schools. Private schools in Palestine also faced frequent closure orders from the Israeli government, although to a lesser extent than other schools, as private schools exercised more stringent discipline on pupils who participated in demonstrations or wrote nationalist graffiti. The Israeli government also cracked down on attempts by Palestinians to organise underground classrooms to try and continue teaching during closures.

The Israeli government would also order all Palestinian universities closed, with most only allowed to re-open in 1991. Birzeit University would remain closed the longest, only allowed to begin re-opening some of its faculties in April 1992.

=== Other suppression measures ===
According to Efrat Silber of the Ben-Gurion University of the Negev, "Israel demolished and sealed houses as punishment for a wide variety of violent acts to deter the general populace from following in wrongdoers’ footsteps and to deter wrongdoers from recidivism," often inviting reporters to witness and film the demolitions live.

The Israeli government also took steps to exile several of the most prominent Palestinian leaders of the Intifada.

=== Shift towards de-escalation ===
As the First Intifada continued despite the Israeli government's use of force, and as the Intifada grew more violent, the Israeli government began to shift strategies, de-emphasising the use of force, reducing the number of soldiers deployed to the Palestinian Territories, and reducing the severity of the restrictions placed on Palestinians. In August 1990, Joel Brinkley of The New York Times reported that in Rafah, the number of injuries and violent incidents had significantly declined following the withdrawal of Israeli troops in May 1990, as part of a de-escalation experiment by new Minister of Defence Moshe Arens, although the number of Palestinian flags and amount of nationalist graffiti had significantly increased.

== Belligerents ==
=== Israel Defence Forces ===
Both the Israeli government and military were largely caught off guard by the breakout of the Intifada. During the first months of the uprising, the IDF faced significant shortages of tear gas and rubber bullets, and few of the soldiers deployed to the Palestinian Territories to suppress the uprising had received training in riot suppression techniques.

Martin van Creveld of the Hebrew University of Jerusalem has argued that the Intifada amplified internal turmoil within the Israeli military that was already present due to the prolonged occupation of Southern Lebanon, saying that "the IDF's discipline was undermined, its self-respect diminished, and its morale reduced to the point that, of every 11 reservists, only 2 still bother to present themselves. To quote chief of staff Lieutenant General Shachak, the organization which used to be the pride of the nation was turned into a 'punching bag'." According to historian Uri Milstein, the Intifada "caused a rift in the IDF between leading tactical specialists on one hand, and operative and strategic leaders on the other," and "damaged the prestige of senior commanders after their shortcomings were exposed." In spring 1988, a group of reservist generals led by Aharon Yariv formed a group calling for the de-escalation of the Israeli strategy, arguing that forceful suppression had only inflamed the uprising.

The Intifada and the Israeli government's response to it also had significant impacts on Israeli soldiers who were deployed to the Palestinian Territories. According to Eliezer Witztum and Ruth Malkinson of the Ben-Gurion University of the Negev, "the perception of ‘a war that is not really a war’ and the ideological, political clash of attitudes blurred the definition of military service during the Intifada. To the soldier, both the tasks and the orders were not clear, nor were the behavioural standards in situations not anticipated by the orders." In the second month of the Intifada, the IDF deployed military psychologists to investigate the mental status of its soldiers.

As well, the role the Israeli military played in attempting to suppress the Intifada had a negative impact on its reputation. Moshe Elad of the Western Galilee College, a former security coordinator between the Israeli military and the Palestinian Authority, has argued that the Intifada "damaged Israel's deterrent force," saying that "the mighty Israel that was dreaded after the 1967 Six-Day War was no longer intimidating and its security forces were no longer deterring. The photograph of the 10-year-old boy throwing a stone at an Israeli tank in Nablus will forever be remembered as the Palestinian "David" who threatened the Israeli "Goliath" and succeeded. It would take Israel a good few more years to restore its deterrence."

=== Settlers ===
According to Chaim Levinson of Haaretz, settler leaders "launched an aggressive campaign against the IDF, claiming that the army was not providing them with adequate protection" during the First Intifada. The Intifada also saw an increase in settler vigilantism.

In August 1989, the Israeli government announced that it would pay for settlers' personal cars to be fitted with reinforced windows as a precaution against Palestinian stone throwing.

== Israeli society ==
=== Arab citizens of Israel ===
According to Alexander Bligh of Ariel University, Arab citizens of Israel "put the Israeli government to the test several times through public confrontations and, at times, violent ones. The main challenge to Israeli authority was a rapid process of creating a political culture of separation from state institutions by generating a separatist ideology, establishing nationalist institutions, and creating or reviving national symbols." Among the significant actions taken by Arab citizens of Israel during the Intifada was the December 1987 Day of Peace general strike against the government's suppression of the uprising. According to Avraham Sela of the Hebrew University of Jerusalem, "the intifada deepened the political rift between the Arabs in Israel and the Jewish state. For the first time, Arab national parties were established that were not satellites of a Zionist party, and with time they won the support of the majority of the Arab electorate." The Arab Democratic Party was formed in 1988 by Labor Alignment MK Abdulwahab Darawshe, who left the Alignment in protest over the Israeli unity government's suppression of the Intifada.

Nadim Rouhana of Harvard University wrote in 1990 that the Intifada was having the effect of increasing the separation between Arab citizens of Israel and Palestinians within the Occupied Territories, with Arab Israeli having "to cope with the disparity between their profound sentimental identi fication with the uprising and the little they have done for it in terms of concrete support," particularly due to fears that the Israeli government would reliate harshly against them and that they would consequently lose what status they had gained within an unequal Israel.

In a 2003 paper, Ilan Aysa of the Max Stern Yezreel Valley College argued that coverage of Arab citizens of Israel in Hebrew-language newspapers during the Intifada revealed a "fear of losing control over the Israeli Arabs" on the part of the Jewish Israeli establishment, with the newspapers regularly serving to pass along "warnings to Israeli Arabs that they act and protest only within a legal framework. Added to these warnings are other messages and threats, which aim to make it clear to the Israeli Arabs that they stand to lose what gains they have made since the withdrawal of martial law from their settlements in the early 1960s."

=== Economy ===
According to journalist Judith Gabriel, the First Intifada "increasingly took on the form of economic warfare" after the first weeks, with Palestinians enacting "widespread boycott of Israeli products, the withholding of tax payments, the closing of shops and businesses in partial and general commercial strikes, mass resignations from jobs in the Israeli sector, the proliferation of neighbourhood 'victory gardens,'and a system of pre-state alternative agencies to meet the people's needs," in response to which the Israeli government was "just as busy with tactics designed to combat the escalating economic resistance and to thwart the movement toward greater Palestinian self-reliance." According to Gabriel, the Palestinian actions had significant impacts on the Israeli economy, including shortages in the construction and slaughterhouse sectors, as well as the effects of the Intifada having a significant impact on the tourism industry. The number of increased soldiers being deployed to counter the Intifada also cost a significant amount of money for the Israeli government.

The Intifada also saw a significant increase in gun sales in Israel. The Ministry of Interior pledged to simplify the process for obtaining a firearms licence.

=== Arrivals of Soviet Jews ===
According to Yossi Klein Halevi, Israeli society in the late 1980s was deeply divided and significantly struggling on a number of issues, including a stagnating economy, the prolonged occupation of Southern Lebanon, and the First Intifada, when "unexpectedly, came this massive influx of immigrants that included a substantial part of the professional and cultural elite of a superpower."

== Israeli politics ==
=== Unity government ===
When the First Intifada broke out, the government of Israel was composed of a unity coalition, regrouping both the centre-left Israeli Labor Party and the right-wing Likud. The breakout of the Intifada increased tensions between the different factions within the unity coalition.

=== Opinion polls ===
An August 1988 poll by Modi'in Ezrachi found that 32% of Israelis had adopted more right-wing political and hawkish military beliefs since the start of the First Intifada, while 14% had adopted more left-wing and less hawkish beliefs, with 53% reporting not having shifted in their beliefs.

An April 1989 poll commissioned by Haaretz found that 54,6% of Israelis supported increasing military force to suppress the Intifada, with 36,6% opposing an increase in force.

== Peace process ==
=== Peace activism ===
The First Intifada saw an increase in peace and anti-occupation activism among Israelis.

The First Intifada also saw a significant mobilisation of women in Israeli peace activism. Valérie Pouzol of Paris 8 University Vincennes-Saint-Denis wrote that, while Israeli women were largely a minority voice in opposition to the 1982 Israeli invasion of Lebanon, the outbreak of the First Intifada "propelled women’s groups opposed to the military occupation onto the public stage," adding that meeting between Israeli and Palestinian feminists during the Intifada "were particularly important for the Israeli participants as they discovered the power of Palestinian women from the territories and, in particular, their feminist convictions. Israeli feminists undertook a number of actions during the Intifada, including attempting to visit Palestinian refugee camps to meet with Palestinian activists (sometimes being blocked by the Israeli military), publicising information about human rights abuses committed by the military against Palestinians, the knitting of the Peace Quilt, and holding demonstrations against the occupation. A number of new Israeli peace groups were founded by women during the Intifada, including Women in Black, Bat Shalom, the Women's Organization for Political Prisoners, and Shani — Israeli Women Against the Occupation. However, the rise in women's peace activism also led to a backlash against women in Israeli society, with Simona Sharoni of the American University stating that "women involved in various peace initiatives, especially Women in Black, became targets for verbal and sometimes physical abuse that was almost always laced with both sexual and sexist innuendo."

=== Peace negotiations ===
As a result of the Intifada, the Israeli government was forced to abandon the idea that it could negotiate the Israeli-Palestinian conflict through third-parties, notably the Kingdom of Jordan, turning instead direct negotiations with Palestinian organisations and the PLO for the first time.
