= Day of Rage =

Day of Rage or Days of Rage may refer to:

- Arab Spring, a wave of protests held in Arab countries since 2010
- Day of Rage (Bahrain), the first day of the 2011 Bahraini uprising
- Days of Rage, a series of demonstrations in Chicago in 1969
- "Days of Rage", a song by Tom Robinson Band from the 1979 album TRB Two
- Indigenous Peoples Day of Rage, a 2020 demonstration in Portland, Oregon
- Day of Rage: How Trump Supporters Took the U.S. Capitol, a 2021 short film about supporters of former president Donald Trump
- Days of Rage: America's Radical Underground, the FBI, and the Forgotten Age of Revolutionary Violence, a book by Bryan Burrough
- Days of Rage: The Young Palestinians, a 1989 documentary
- Global Day of Jihad, rumored call to jihad by Hamas during the Gaza war
