= 1991–1992 Ramallah curfew =

Curfew during the First Intifada

From December 1991 to January 1992 during the First Intifada, the Israeli government imposed a curfew on the Palestine residents of the Ramallah–Al-Bireh area.

== Events ==
On the evening of 1 December 1991, three days before the start of the bilateral peace negotiations in Washington, Palestinian militants fired shots at the car of Israeli settler Zvi Klein as he travelled from the settlement of Ofra to Jerusalem. The shots struck Klein in the head, severely injuring him, while less severely injuring his daughter. Klein was treated in the Hadassah Medical Center, but died of his injuries.

As a result of the shooting, the Israel Defense Forces (IDF) rapidly imposed a full-day curfew on the Ramallah–Al-Bireh area, confining all Palestinian residents to their homes around the clock. After imposing the curfew, Israeli soldiers began searching the area for the shooters. The curfew was temporarily lifted for four hours on 4 December, to allow Palestinians to buy supplies. The curfew was relaxed on 15 December, from an around-the-clock ban on residents leaving their homes to a nighttime ban between 17:00 and 6:00. On the same day, the Israeli military imposed a ban on all West Bank Palestinians from being within 150 metres of major motorways in the West Bank at night.

According to Clyde Haberman of The New York Times:

For the many here who commute to jobs in Jerusalem, curfew means having to figure out how to leave work early to be in one's house by 5 P.M. For a chocolate factory, it means shutting down the night shift. For taxi drivers, it means a big reduction in the work day. For children, it means being off the streets earlier than they like or their parents can stand, and taking their games indoors. One common diversion is playing Israeli soldier, which includes pointing imaginary rifles at one another and shouting, "Mamnouwa a tajawool!" -- Arabic for "curfew is imposed!" And for almost everyone, it means long periods without seeing relatives and friends, thus deepening the isolation that was already considerable under the multiple blows of long military occupation and the repeated strikes imposed by the uprising... The two weeks of 24-hour curfew that followed the Zvi Klein slaying were especially difficult, residents say. They never got advance word about when the restrictions would be temporarily lifted to permit them to replenish supplies, and some learned that they were free to move about only after it was too late. Often, neighborhood stores were empty or reduced to rotting fruits and vegetables. In a winter that has been uncommonly cold, fuel supplies ran low. For the last six weeks, curfew has not set in until 5 P.M., and it is therefore easier to arrange one's life. Even so, a dentist here says that almost no patients show up in the afternoon because they are afraid of the most remote chance that they might violate the curfew.

On 28 January 1992, the Supreme Court of Israel ruled that the IDF should lift the curfew by 11 February at the latest.

== Reactions ==
=== In Israel ===
Minister of Defence Moshe Arens stated that "I hope [Palestinians] understand we have no choice but to take these measures." IDF military commander in the West Bank Danny Yatom denied that curfews were imposed as punishment, saying that they served "purely intelligence and operational reasons." Deputy Minister in the Prime Minister's Office Benjamin Netanyahu accused Palestinians of trying to sabotage the ongoing peace negotiations via attacks. In early February 1992, the Israeli military relaxed its regulations on firing at Palestinians as a result of the Klein shooting and other shootings aimed at settlers' cars.

Israeli NGO Peace Now described the curfew as collective punishment. Yossi Sarid of Ratz warned that settler vigilantism risked "the end of the democratic system in Israel, and things may develop into a civil war."

The shooting provoked strong reactions from the settler community in the West Bank, who accused the Israeli military of failing to protect them. On 9 December, following a ceremony at the site of the shooting to mark the end of the shiva mourning period, a group of settlers rioted through Ramallah, smashing cars and windows. A second settler riot occurred on 15 December, in Ramallah, Al-Bireh, Hebron, and Halhul. On 19 December, a group of settlers blockaded the road between Nablus and Jerusalem in protest over Palestinian attacks on settler cars.

The Rehelim settlement, which was illegally founded on 2 December 1991, was initially assumed by many in Israel to have been founded in response to Klein's shooting. Later information, however, showed that the settlement had been approved by the Israeli government in late-November 1991, in response to an October 1991 shooting at the Tapuach Junction which killed two settlers heading to an anti-peace negotiations protest.

=== In Palestine ===
According to Clyde Haberman of The New York Times, the curfew provoked more resentment among Palestinians than the Gulf War curfew in Palestine in early 1991, saying that Ramallah residents "do not understand the security concerns invoked by Israel. From their vantage point, it amounts to collective punishment," and quoting Ramallah psychologist Youssef Abu Samra as saying that "It seems to me that Israel is trying to put Palestinians in a ghetto."

=== Internationally ===
Human Rights Watch described the curfew as "an act of collective punishment, in violation of international human rights and humanitarian law," citing both "its severity and scope."

== Analysis ==
Gil Sedan of the Jewish Telegraphic Agency wrote in late January 1992 that while Palestinians "were, for the first time, treated as equals at a peace conference," referring to the Madrid negotiations, "they made no political gains. There was no independence, no autonomy, no change of living conditions in the territories under Israeli rule. The Washington talks failed to get beyond wrangling with Israel over procedure. Meanwhile, Palestinian extremists have reverted to terrorism, fatally shooting four Israeli settlers from ambush in the past two months. The Israelis retaliated with curfews, mass arrests and deportation orders against 12 Palestinian activists, which are now being appealed before the High Court of Justice."

Alan Cowell of The New York Times warned of the effect the curfew, and other curfews imposed by the Israeli government during the First Intifada, would have on the Palestinian Christian communities, saying that "Christians have generally had greater educational opportunities" in Palestine since the 19th century, and as a result, "The church schools had also helped to mold a Palestinian middle class that dominated local commerce, and arguably had the most to lose when the strikes and curfews of the uprising closed down stores and businesses."
