= First Intifada =

1987–1993 Palestinian uprising against Israel

- Part of the Israeli–Palestinian conflict
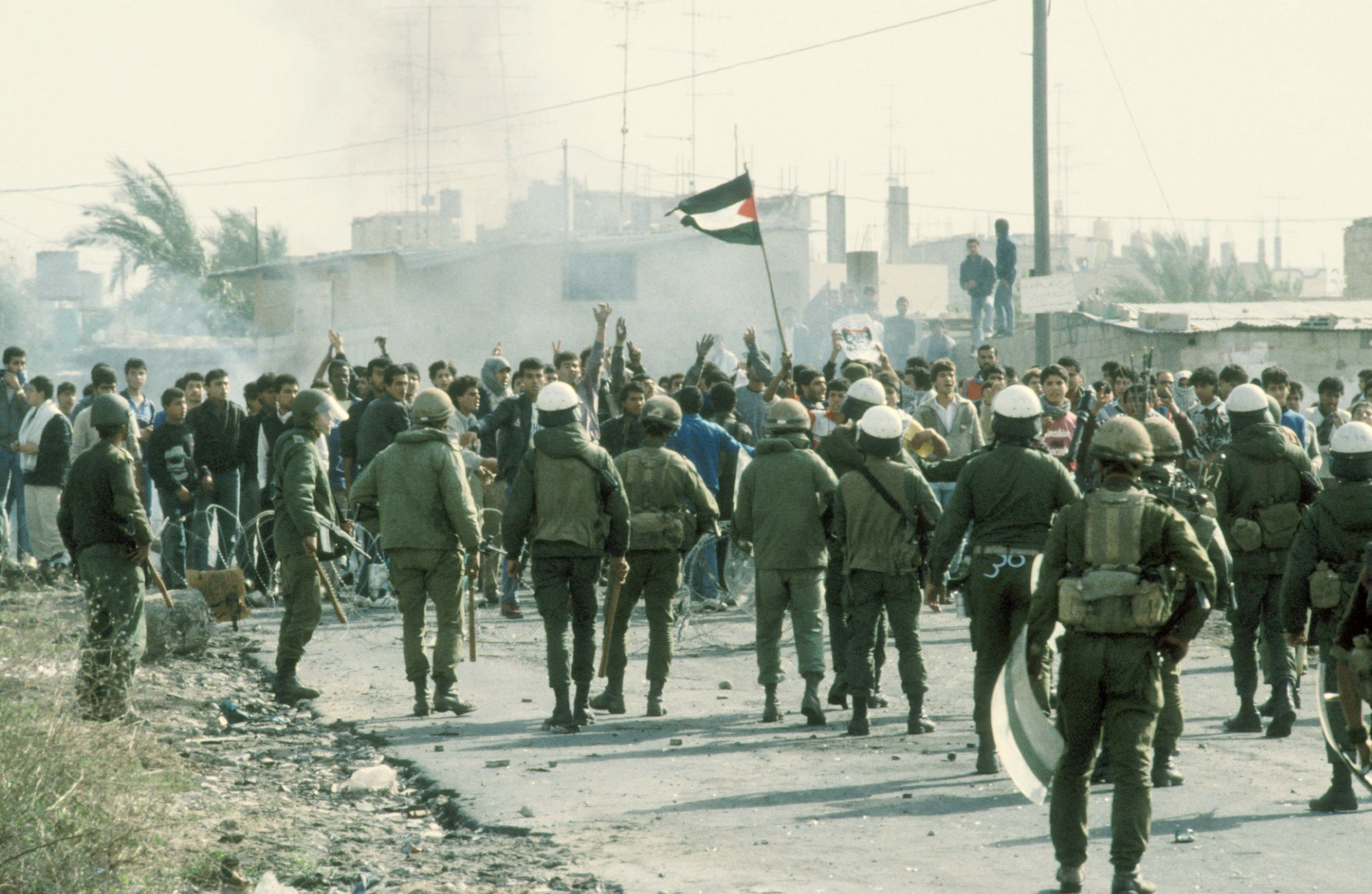
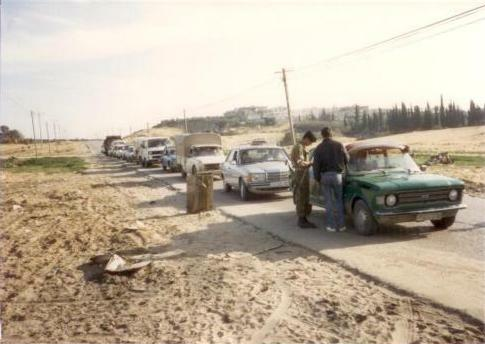
- Top, bottom: Palestinian protestors confront Israeli troops in Gaza City, 1987; Israeli military checkpoint near Jabalia in the Gaza Strip, 1988
Date	9 December 1987 – 13 September 1993 (5 years, 9 months and 5 days)
Location	Israel; Occupied Palestinian Territory
Result	Uprising suppressed: Hamas grows in strength at the expense of the PLO; Madrid Conference (1991); Oslo I Accord (1993); Israel–PLO Letters of Mutual Recognition; Establishment of the Palestinian National Authority
Territorial changes	Creation of the West Bank "Areas" by the Oslo II Accord in 1995

Belligerents
Israel	Al-Qiyada al-Muwhhada; Fatah; Popular Front for the Liberation of Palestine; Democratic Front for the Liberation of Palestine; Palestinian Communist Party; (Palestine) Palestinian independent protesters; Hamas; Palestinian Islamic Jihad

Commanders and leaders
(Israel) Chaim Herzog; (Israel) Ezer Weizman; (Israel) Yitzhak Shamir; (Israel) Yitzhak Rabin; (Israel) Dan Shomron	(Palestine) Marwan Barghouti

Casualties and losses
179–200 killed by Palestinians	1,962 killed: 771-942 killed by Palestinians

The First Intifada (Arabic: الانتفاضة الأولى, romanized: al-Intifāḍa al-’Ūlā, lit. 'The First Uprising'), also known as the First Palestinian Intifada, was a sustained uprising involving violent and non-violent protests, acts of civil disobedience, riots, and terrorist attacks carried out by Palestinian civilians and militants in the Israeli-occupied Palestinian territories and Israel. It was motivated by collective Palestinian frustration over Israel's military occupation of the West Bank and the Gaza Strip as it approached a twenty-year mark, having begun in the wake of the 1967 Arab–Israeli War. The uprising lasted from December 1987 until the Madrid Conference of 1991, though some date its conclusion to 1993, the year the Oslo Accords were signed.

The Intifada began on 9 December 1987 in the Jabalia refugee camp after an Israeli truck driver collided with parked civilian vehicles, killing four Palestinian workers, three of whom were from the refugee camp. Palestinians charged that the collision was a deliberate response for the killing of an Israeli in Gaza days earlier. Israel denied that the crash, which came at time of heightened tensions, was intentional or coordinated. The Palestinian response was characterized by protests, civil disobedience, and strikes, with excessive violence in response from Israeli security forces. There was graffiti, barricading, and widespread throwing of stones and Molotov cocktails at the Israeli army and its infrastructure within the West Bank and Gaza Strip. These contrasted with civil efforts including general strikes, boycotts of Israeli Civil Administration institutions in the Gaza Strip and the West Bank, an economic boycott consisting of refusal to work in Israeli settlements on Israeli products, refusal to pay taxes, and refusal to drive Palestinian cars with Israeli licenses.

Israel deployed some 80,000 soldiers in response. Israeli countermeasures, which initially included the use of live rounds frequently in cases of riots, were criticized by Human Rights Watch as disproportionate, in addition to Israel's excessive use of lethal force. In the first 13 months, 332 Palestinians and 12 Israelis were killed. Images of soldiers beating adolescents with clubs then led to the adoption of firing semi-lethal plastic bullets. During the whole six-year intifada, the Israeli army killed at least 1,087 Palestinians, of which 240 were children.

Among Israelis, 100 civilians and 60 Israeli soldiers were killed, often by militants outside the control of the Intifada's UNLU, and more than 1,400 Israeli civilians and 1,700 soldiers were injured. Intra-Palestinian violence was also a prominent feature of the Intifada, with widespread executions of an estimated 822 Palestinians killed as alleged Israeli collaborators (1988–April 1994). At the time, Israel reportedly obtained information from some 18,000 Palestinians who had been "compromised", although fewer than half had any proven contact with the Israeli authorities. Years later, the Second Intifada took place from September 2000 to 2005.

== Background ==
According to Mubarak Awad, a Palestinian American clinical psychologist, the Intifada was a protest against Israeli repression, including "beatings, shootings, killings, house demolitions, uprooting of trees, deportations, extended imprisonments, and detentions without trial". In the years prior to the Intifada, Awad had been "among the keenest advocates for nonviolent struggle", founding the Palestinian Center for the Study of Nonviolence. After Israel's capture of the West Bank, Jerusalem, Sinai Peninsula, and Gaza Strip from Jordan and Egypt in the Six-Day War in 1967, frustration grew among Palestinians in the Israeli-occupied territories. Israel opened its labor market to Palestinians in the newly occupied territories, who were recruited mainly to do unskilled or semi-skilled labor jobs Israelis did not want. By the time of the Intifada, over 40 percent of the Palestinian workforce worked in Israel daily. Additionally, Israeli expropriation of Palestinian land, high birthrates in the West Bank and Gaza Strip, and the limited allocation of land for new building and agriculture created conditions marked by growing population density and rising unemployment, even for those with university degrees. At the time of the Intifada, only one in eight college-educated Palestinians could find degree-related work. This was coupled with an expansion of a Palestinian university system catering to people from refugee camps, villages, and small towns, generating a new Palestinian elite from a lower social strata that was more activistic and confrontational with Israel. According to Israeli historian and diplomat Shlomo Ben-Ami in his book Scars of War, Wounds of Peace, the Intifada was also a rebellion against the Palestine Liberation Organization (PLO). Ben-Ami describes the PLO as uncompromising and reliant on international terrorism, which he says exacerbated Palestinian grievances.

The Israeli Labor Party's Yitzhak Rabin, then Defense Minister, added deportations in August 1985 to Israel's "Iron Fist" policy of cracking down on Palestinian nationalism. This, which led to 50 deportations in the following four years, was accompanied by economic integration and increasing Israeli settlements, such that the Jewish settler population in the West Bank alone nearly doubled from 35,000 in 1984 to 64,000 in 1988, reaching 130,000 by the mid-nineties. Referring to the developments, Israeli minister of Economics and Finance, Gad Ya'acobi, stated that "a creeping process of de facto annexation" contributed to a growing militancy in Palestinian society.

During the 1980s a number of mainstream Israeli politicians referred to policies of transferring the Palestinian population out of the territories, leading to Palestinian fears that Israel planned to evict them. Public statements calling for transfer of the Palestinian population were made by Deputy Defense Minister Michael Dekel, Cabinet Minister Mordechai Tzipori and government Minister Yosef Shapira among others. Describing the causes of the Intifada, Benny Morris refers to the "all-pervading element of humiliation", caused by the protracted occupation which he says was "always a brutal and mortifying experience for the occupied" and was "founded on brute force, repression and fear, collaboration and treachery, beatings and torture chambers, and daily intimidation, humiliation, and manipulation."

=== Trigger for the uprising ===
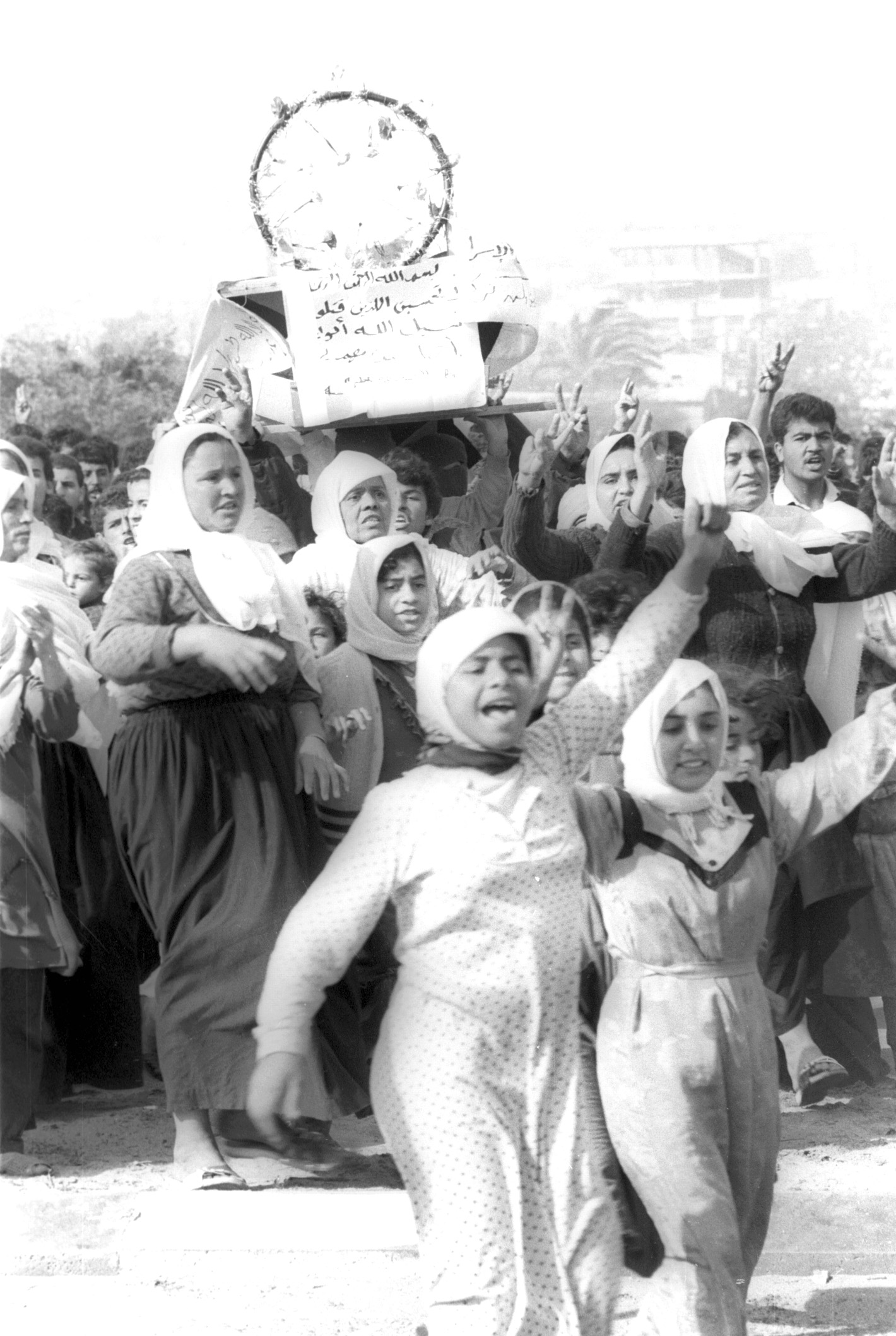
Protests in the Gaza Strip at the onset of the First Intifada in 1987

While the catalyst for the First Intifada is generally dated to a truck incident involving several Palestinian fatalities at the Erez Crossing in December 1987, Mazin Qumsiyeh argues, against Donald Neff, that it began with multiple youth demonstrations earlier in the preceding month. Some sources consider that the perceived IDF failure in late November 1987 to stop a Palestinian guerrilla operation, the Night of the Gliders, in which six Israeli soldiers were killed, helped catalyze local Palestinians to rebel.

Mass demonstrations had occurred a year earlier when, after two Gaza students at Birzeit University had been shot by Israeli soldiers on campus on 4 December 1986, the Israelis responded with harsh punitive measures, involving summary arrest, detention, and systematic beatings of handcuffed Palestinian youths, ex-prisoners and activists, some 250 of whom were detained in four cells inside a converted army camp, known popularly as Ansar 11, outside Gaza City. A policy of deportation was introduced to intimidate activists in January 1987. Violence simmered as a schoolboy from Khan Yunis was shot dead by Israeli soldiers pursuing him in a Jeep. Over the summer the IDF's Lieutenant Ron Tal, who was responsible for guarding detainees at Ansar 11, was shot dead at point-blank range while stuck in a Gaza traffic jam. A curfew forbidding Gaza residents from leaving their homes was imposed for three days, during the Islamic holiday of Eid al-Adha. In two incidents on 1 and 6 October 1987, the IDF ambushed and killed seven Gazan men, reportedly affiliated with Islamic Jihad, who had escaped from prison in May. Some days later, a 17-year-old schoolgirl, Intisar al-'Attar, was shot in her schoolyard in Deir al-Balah by settlers in the Gaza Strip after allegedly throwing stones at them. The Arab summit in Amman in November 1987 focused on the Iran–Iraq War, and the Palestinian issue was shunted to the sidelines for the first time in years.

== Timeline of the Intifada ==
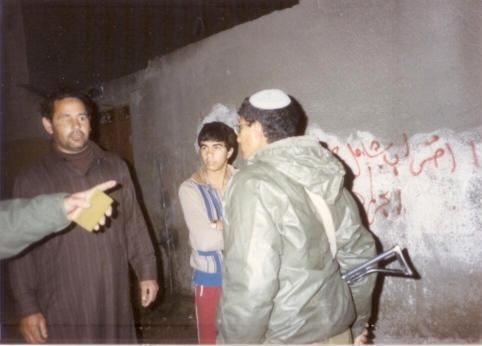
An IDF soldier telling a resident of Jabalia to erase a slogan on a wall during the First Intifada.

=== Israel's occupation and Palestinian unrest ===
Israel's drive into the occupied territories had occasioned spontaneous acts of resistance, but the administration, pursuing an "iron fist" policy of collective punishment including deportations, demolition of homes, curfews, collective punishment, and the suppression of political and educational institutions, was confident that Palestinian resistance was exhausted. The assessment that the unrest would collapse proved to be mistaken.

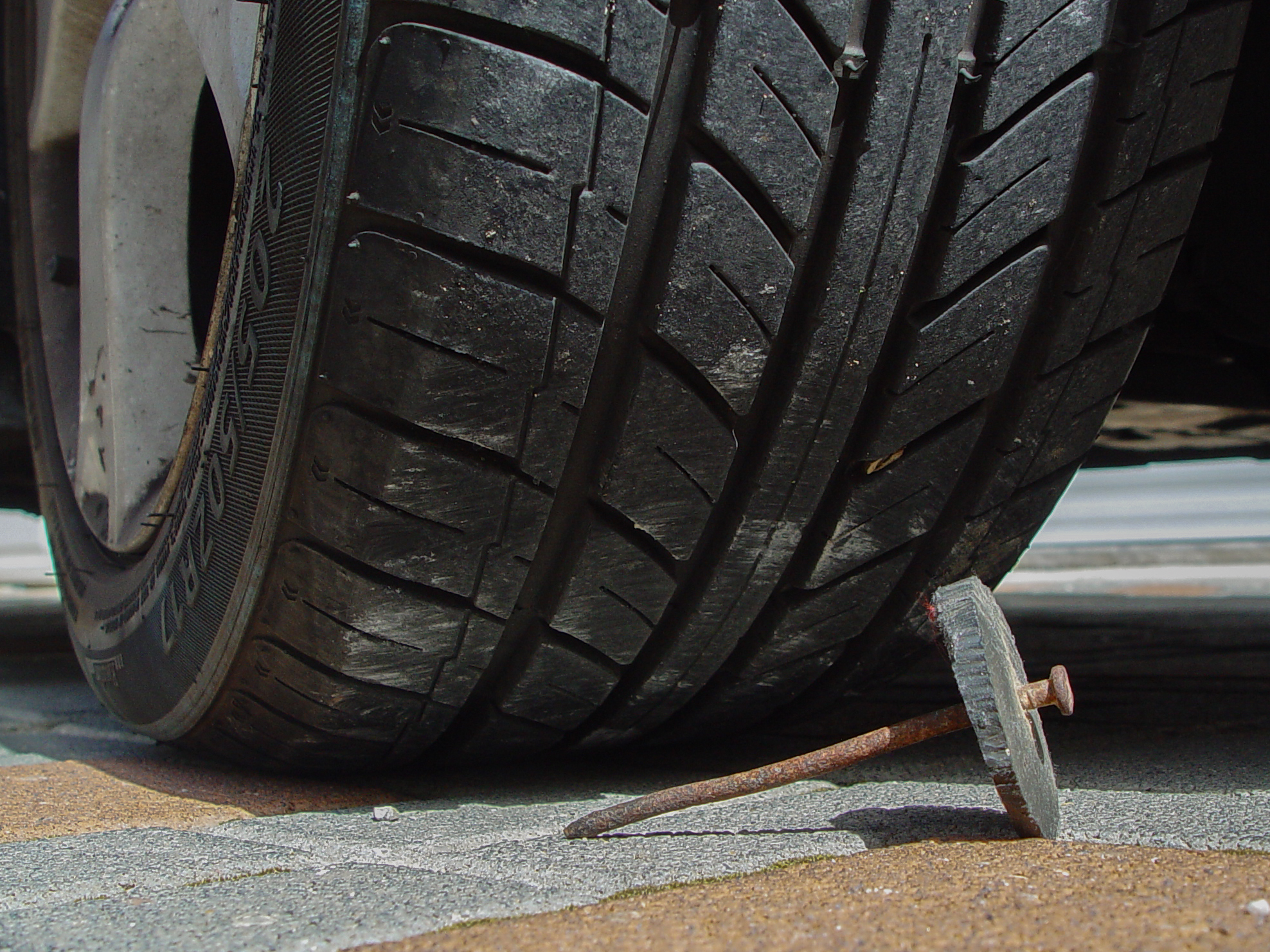
An improvised tire-puncturing device (slang term 'Ninja') comprising an iron nail inserted into a rubber disc (from used tire). Many of these makeshift weapons were scattered by Palestinians on main roads in the occupied territories of the West Bank during the First Intifada.

On 8 December 1987, an Israeli truck crashed into a row of cars containing Palestinians returning from working in Israel, at the Erez checkpoint. Four Palestinians, three of them residents of the Jabalya refugee camp, the largest of the eight refugee camps in the Gaza Strip, were killed and seven others seriously injured. The traffic incident was witnessed by hundreds of Palestinian labourers returning home from work. The funerals, attended by 10,000 people from the camp that evening, quickly led to a large demonstration. Rumours swept the camp that the incident was an act of intentional retaliation for the stabbing to death of an Israeli businessman, killed while shopping in Gaza two days earlier. The next day, 9 December, Palestinian teenagers threw stones and, according to the IDF, also gasoline bombs, (Note: The Israeli military said at least two gasoline bombs landed on the army patrol vehicle but they did not explode) at military vehicles. The soldiers started shooting in response, killing 17 year-old Hatem Al-Sesi and wounding 16 others.

On 9 December, several popular and professional Palestinian leaders held a press conference in West Jerusalem with the Israeli League for Human and Civil Rights in response to the deterioration of the situation. While they convened, reports came in that demonstrations at the Jabalya camp were underway and that a 17-year-old Palestinian had been shot to death by Israeli soldiers after a group of Palestinians threw gasoline bombs at an IDF vehicle. The Palestinian would later become known as the first martyr of the Intifada. Protests rapidly spread into the West Bank and East Jerusalem. Youths took control of neighbourhoods, closed off camps with barricades of garbage, stone and burning tires, meeting soldiers who endeavoured to break through with petrol bombs. Palestinian shopkeepers closed their businesses, and labourers refused to turn up to their work in Israel. Israel defined these activities as 'riots', and justified the repression as necessary to restore 'law and order'. Within days the occupied territories were engulfed in a wave of demonstrations and commercial strikes on an unprecedented scale. Specific elements of the occupation were targeted for attack: military vehicles, Israeli buses and Israeli banks. None of the dozen Israeli settlements were attacked and there were no Israeli fatalities from stone-throwing at cars at this early period of the outbreak. Equally unprecedented was the number of participants in these disturbances: tens of thousands of civilians, including women and children. The Israeli security forces used various crowd control measures to try and quell the disturbances: nightsticks, tear gas, water cannons, rubber bullets, and live ammunition. But the disturbances only gathered momentum.

Soon there was widespread rock-throwing, road-blocking and tire burning throughout the territories. By 12 December 6 Palestinians had died and 30 had been injured in the violence. The next day, rioters threw a gasoline bomb at the U.S. consulate in East Jerusalem, though no one was hurt. The Israeli police and military response also led to a number of injuries and deaths. The IDF killed many Palestinians at the beginning of the Intifada, the majority killed during demonstrations and riots. Since initially a high proportion of those killed were civilians and youths, Yitzhak Rabin adopted a fallback policy of 'might, power and beatings'. Israel used mass arrests of Palestinians, engaged in collective punishments like closing down West Bank universities for most years of the Intifada, and West Bank schools for a total of 12 months. Hebron University was closed by the army from January 1988 to June 1991. Local officials imposed multiday curfews at least 400 times in the first year, and overnight curfews even more often. Communities were cut off from supplies of water, electricity and fuel. At any one time, 25,000 Palestinians would be confined to their homes. Trees were uprooted on Palestinians farms, and agricultural produce blocked from being sold. In the first year over 1,000 Palestinians had their homes either demolished or blocked up. Settlers also engaged in private attacks on Palestinians. Palestinian refusals to pay taxes were met with confiscations of property and licenses, new car taxes, and heavy fines for any family whose members had been identified as stone-throwers.

=== 1990 Temple Mount killings ===
On 8 October 1990, 22 Palestinians were killed by Israeli police during the 1990 Temple Mount killings at Al-Aqsa. This was followed by an increase in the of Palestinian attacks, with three Israeli civilians and one IDF soldier stabbed in Jerusalem and Gaza two weeks later. Incidents of stabbing persisted. The Israeli state apparatus carried out contradictory and conflicting policies that were seen to have injured Israel's own interests, such as the closing of educational establishments (putting more youths onto the streets) and issuing the Shin Bet list of collaborators. Suicide bombings by Palestinian militants started on 16 April 1993 with the Mehola Junction bombing, carried at the end of the Intifada.

=== Assassination of Abu Jihad ===
On 16 April 1988, a leader of the PLO, Khalil al-Wazir, was assassinated in Tunis by an Israeli commando squad. Israel claimed he was the 'remote-control "main organizer" of the revolt', and perhaps believed that his death would break the back of the Intifada. During the mass demonstrations and mourning in Gaza that followed, two of the main mosques of Gaza were raided by the IDF and worshippers were beaten and tear-gassed. In total between 11 and 15 Palestinians were killed during the demonstrations and riots in Gaza and West Bank that followed al-Wazir's death. In June of that year, the Arab League agreed to support the Intifada financially at the 1988 Arab League summit. The Arab League reaffirmed its financial support in the 1989 summit.

Israeli defense minister Yitzhak Rabin's response was: "We will teach them there is a price for refusing the laws of Israel." When time in prison did not stop the activists, Israel crushed the boycott by imposing heavy fines and seizing and disposing of equipment, furnishings, and goods from local stores, factories and homes.

== Casualties ==
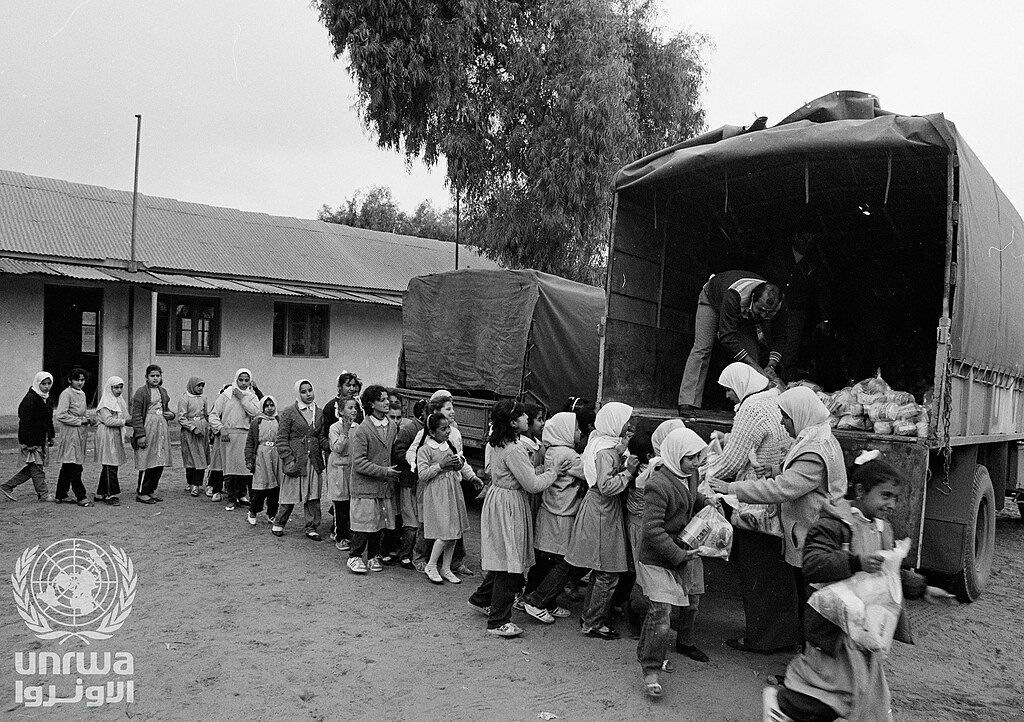
School girls wait in line to collect UNRWA prepared food parcels during the first intifada in 1988

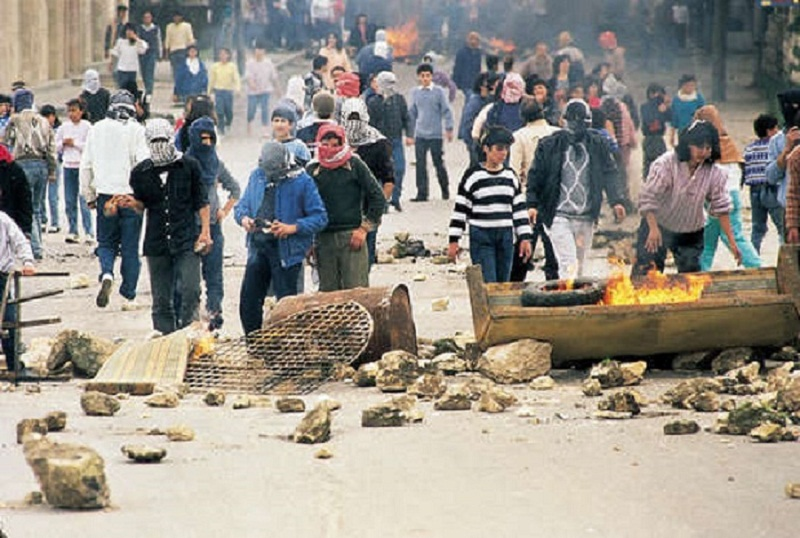
Barricades during the Intifada

In the first year in the Gaza Strip alone, 142 Palestinians were killed, while no Israelis died. 77 were shot dead, and 37 died from tear-gas inhalation. 17 died from beatings at the hand of Israeli police or soldiers. During the whole six-year intifada, the Israeli army killed from 1,087 to 1,204 (or 1,284) Palestinians, 241/332 being children. Tens of thousands were arrested (some sources said 57,000; others said 120,000), 481 were deported while 2,532 had their houses razed to the ground. Between December 1987 and June 1991, 120,000 were injured, 15,000 arrested and 1,882 homes demolished. One journalistic calculation reports that in the Gaza Strip alone from 1988 to 1993, some 60,706 Palestinians suffered injuries from shootings, beatings or tear gas. In the first five weeks alone, 35 Palestinians were killed and some 1,200 wounded. Some regarded the Israeli response as encouraging more Palestinians into participating. B'Tselem calculated 179 Israelis killed, while official Israeli statistics place the total at 200 over the same period. 3,100 Israelis, 1,700 of them soldiers, and 1,400 civilians suffered injuries. By 1990 Ktzi'ot Prison in the Negev held approximately one out of every 50 West Bank and Gazan males older than 16 years. Gerald Kaufman remarked: "[F]riends of Israel as well as foes have been shocked and saddened by that country's response to the disturbances." In an article in the London Review of Books, John Mearsheimer and Stephen Walt asserted that IDF soldiers were given truncheons and encouraged to break the bones of Palestinian protesters. The Swedish branch of Save the Children estimated that "23,600 to 29,900 children required medical treatment for their beating injuries in the first two years of the Intifada", one third of whom were children under the age of ten years.

Israel adopted a policy of arresting key representatives of Palestinian institutions. After lawyers in Gaza went on strike to protest their inability to visit their detained clients, Israel detained the deputy head of its association without trial for six months. Dr. Zakariya al-Agha, the head of the Gaza Medical Association, was likewise arrested and held for a similar period of detention, as were several women active in Women's Work Committees. During Ramadan, many camps in Gaza were placed under curfew for weeks, impeding residents from buying food, and Al-Shati, Jabalya and Burayj were subjected to saturation bombing by tear gas. During the first year of the Intifada, the total number of casualties in the camps from such bombing totalled 16.

Between 1988 and 1992, intra-Palestinian violence claimed the lives of nearly 1,000. By June 1990, according to Benny Morris, "[T]he Intifada seemed to have lost direction. A symptom of the PLO's frustration was the great increase in the killing of suspected collaborators." Roughly 18,000 Palestinians, compromised by Israeli intelligence, are said to have given information to the other side. Collaborators were threatened with death or ostracism unless they desisted, and if their collaboration with the Occupying Power continued, were executed by special troops such as the "Black Panthers" and "Red Eagles". An estimated 771 (according to Associated Press) to 942 (according to the IDF) Palestinians were executed on suspicion of collaboration during the span of the Intifada.

== Palestinian leadership ==
The Intifada was not initiated by any single individual or organization. Local leadership came from groups and organizations affiliated with the PLO that operated within the Occupied Territories; Fatah, the Popular Front, the Democratic Front and the Palestine Communist Party. The PLO's rivals in this activity were the Islamic organizations, Hamas and Islamic Jihad as well as local leadership in cities such as Beit Sahour and Bethlehem. However, the Intifada was predominantly led by community councils led by Hanan Ashrawi, Faisal Husseini and Haidar Abdel-Shafi, that promoted independent networks for education (underground schools as the regular schools were closed by the military in reprisal), medical care, and food aid. The Unified National Leadership of the Uprising (UNLU) gained credibility where the Palestinian society complied with the issued communiques. There was a collective commitment to abstain from lethal violence, a notable departure from past practice, which, according to Shalev arose from a calculation that recourse to arms would lead to an Israeli bloodbath and undermine the support they had in Israeli liberal quarters. The PLO and its chairman Yassir Arafat had also decided on an unarmed strategy, in the expectation that negotiations at that time would lead to an agreement with Israel. The First Intifada was mostly peaceful and non-violent, and it has been described as a "quiet revolution" by Mary King. Pearlman attributes the non-violent character of the uprising to the movement's internal organization and its capillary outreach to neighborhood committees that ensured that lethal revenge would not be the response even in the face of Israeli state repression. Hamas and Islamic Jihad cooperated with the leadership at the outset, and throughout the first year of the uprising conducted no armed attacks, except for stabbing of a soldier in October 1988 and the detonation of two roadside bombs, which had no impact.

=== Pivot to the two-state solution ===
Leaflets publicizing the Intifada's aims demanded the complete withdrawal of Israel from the territories it had occupied in 1967: the lifting of curfews and checkpoints; it appealed to Palestinians to join in civic resistance, while asking them not to employ arms, since military resistance would only invite devastating retaliation from Israel; it also called for the establishment of the Palestinian state on the West Bank and the Gaza Strip, abandoning the standard rhetorical calls, still current at the time, for the "liberation" of all of Palestine.

=== Hamas ===
During the First Intifada the goal of Hamas was to destroy Israel and replace it with an Islamist Palestinian state, the group had very poor relations with the PLO and UNLU due to the PLO recognition of Israel, and was their main competitor for power. Hamas hoped that its opposition to negotiation, its more violent approach, and dissatisfaction with the PLO would allow them to grow at the expense of the PLO, and this was largely what happened.

Hamas both participated in protests organized by the UNLU and organized its own protests, mainly organizing around mosques while jockeying for influence with the PLO and UNLU. They also engaged in armed combat operations targeting Israeli soldiers and civilians. During the 1st year of the Intifada there were only 10 attacks which were limited to detonating explosives and shooting at patrols, but over time these attacks increased in frequency with the 2nd year alone seeing 32 attacks including the kidnapping of 2 Israeli soldiers within the Green Line. In response to this Israel began to arrest and kill many Hamas leaders including Ahmad Yassin, this triggered a crisis within Hamas which led to the formation of the Al-Qassam Brigades as a separate branch within Hamas, but the group managed to survive these attacks. By the end of the Intifada the groups had emerged as the biggest winner with them gaining significant political and military power both within Palestine and abroad.

The first Hamas suicide bombing was in April 1993 when a car bomb exploded in the Jordan Valley. A notable Hamas figure named Yikhia Ayaskh, Hamas's top bomb maker responsible for many attacks, was killed by the IDF on 5 January 1996. This further enraged the already radical Hamas leading to launch several more suicide bombings. The group had wanted to Shimon Peres to lose the upcoming Israeli Prime Ministerial elections and through the further radicalization these attacks resulted in, likely flipped the election in favor of Benjamin Netanyahu.

=== Palestinian Islamic Jihad ===
Throughout the First Intifada the goal of Palestinian Islamic Jihad (PIJ) was the establishment of an Islamist Palestinian state spanning the whole of former Mandatory Palestine and the destruction of Israel. In this and other aspects the groups ideology similar to Khomeinism. During the Intifada the PIJ would use both terrorism and civil resistance throughout the Intifada. During the early stages of the Intifada it seemed likely that the group would merge with the PLO largely due to their mutual disapproval of violence at the time. But this never happened because the UNLU disliked the PIJ and prevented the merger, though the groups still cooperated periodically.

At the beginning of the Intifada the PIJ had only 300 members but they have far more ideological supporters which gave them outsized influence for their size. In the first month of the Intifada it was very active in organizing and calling for protests but after the start of 1988 the groups decreased in activity and was crippled in March 1988 when the IDF arrested many of the leaders and members. It took the group until Fall of 1988 to regroup and after it did it took on a more militant approach and ended its relationship with the PLO.

== Response by the United Nations ==
The large number of Palestinian casualties provoked international condemnation. In subsequent resolutions, including 607 and 608, the Security Council demanded Israel cease deportations of Palestinians. In November 1988, Israel was condemned by a large majority of the UN General Assembly for its actions against the Intifada. The resolution was repeated in the following years.

=== Security Council ===
On 17 February 1989, the UN Security Council drafted a resolution condemning Israel for disregarding Security Council resolutions, as well as for not complying with the fourth Geneva Convention. The United States vetoed a draft resolution which would have strongly deplored Israel. On 9 June, the US again vetoed a resolution. On 7 November, the US vetoed a third draft resolution, condemning alleged Israeli violations of human rights.

On 14 October 1990, Israel openly declared that it would not abide by Security Council Resolution 672 because it did not consider attacks on Jewish worshippers at the Western Wall. Israel refused to receive a delegation of the Secretary-General, which would investigate Israeli violence. The following Resolution 673 made little impression and Israel continued to obstruct UN investigations.

== Reactions and outcome ==
=== Impact on Israeli-Palestinian conflict ===
The Intifada was recognized as an occasion where the Palestinians acted cohesively and independently of their leadership or assistance of neighboring Arab states. It transformed the conflict, helping bring about the Madrid Conference of 1991 and the signing of the Oslo Accords in 1993.

The success of the Intifada gave Arafat and his followers the confidence they needed to moderate their political program. At the meeting of the Palestine National Council in Algiers in mid-November 1988, Arafat won a majority for the historic decision to recognize Israel's legitimacy, accept all the relevant UN resolutions going back to 29 November 1947, and adopt the principle of a two-state solution based on 1967 borders.

Reflecting on the impact of the Intifada, former United States President Jimmy Carter wrote that, "The Palestinians' nonviolent resistance in the First Intifada ... contested military occupation from a store of classic methods used on every continent in today's world, as people fight for human rights and justice with concern for the connection between the ends and means." He added that, "the use of concerted nonviolent action offers a basis for transformation of conflict to peace building."

The founder of the Palestinian Center for the Study of Nonviolence, Jerusalem-born Mubarak Awad, played a major role in advocating for and organizing civil disobedience campaigns against the Israel's occupation in the years prior to the First Intifada. Following the outbreak of the Intifada, Israel arrested and deported Awad in 1988, despite opposition from the Reagan administration. Prime Minister Yitzhak Shamir ordered Awad's expulsion on grounds of inciting a "civil uprising" and distributing leaflets that advocated for non-violent resistance and civil disobedience.

Palestinian politician and leader of the Palestinian National Initiative party, Dr. Mustafa Barghouti, attributed the foundations of the First Intifada to the rise of grassroots, local committees across the occupied Palestinian territories in the 1970s. He argued that, "Hamas became radicalized by the brutality of the Occupation, by the violence used to repress the first Intifada." Barghouti has contended the "militarization" of the Second Intifada, which began in 2000, was a mistake, and he criticized Fatah for failing to condemn suicide bombings at the time.

Mary Elizabeth King (2009) wrote that the nonviolence of the First Intifada "neither lifted the military occupation nor stopped the implanting of Israeli settlements in lands set aside for the Palestinians by the United Nations. Nevertheless, the uprising's nonviolent sanctions achieved more than had decades of armed attacks on largely civilian targets. ... Israeli agents provocateurs in Arab disguise ... joined demonstrations and sought to incite demonstrators to use violence. The local committee [organizing the nonviolent demonstrations] prevented such provocations from instigating lethal escalations." The First Intifada disintegrated "into violence after Israel's incarceration, deportation, or discrediting of the very activist intellectuals who had sustained the uprising's nonviolent character".

=== Impact on Israel's reputation ===
The Intifada broke the image of Jerusalem as a united Israeli city. There was unprecedented international coverage, and the Israeli response was criticized in media outlets and international fora. The impact on the Israeli services sector, including the important Israeli tourist industry, was notably negative.

=== Jordan severs ties with the West Bank ===
Jordan severed its residual administrative and financial ties to the West Bank in the face of sweeping popular support for the PLO. The failure of the "Iron Fist" policy, Israel's deteriorating international image, Jordan cutting legal and administrative ties to the West Bank, and the U.S.'s recognition of the PLO as the representative of the Palestinian people forced Rabin to seek an end to the violence though negotiation and dialogue with the PLO.

== See also ==
- 1990 Temple Mount riots
- Second Intifada (2000–2005)
- 2014 Jerusalem unrest (2014)
- Israeli–Palestinian conflict (2015)
- Sumud (steadfastness)
- Palestinian nationalism
- Palestinian political violence
- List of modern conflicts in the Middle East
- Days of Rage: The Young Palestinians (1989)
- Cooperatives in the First Intifada
- Education during the First Intifada
- 1991–1992 Ramallah curfew

== Bibliography ==
- Ackerman, Peter; DuVall, Jack (2000). A Force More Powerful: A Century of Nonviolent Conflict. New York: Palgrave. ISBN 978-0-312-24050-9.
- Alimi, Eitan Y. (2006). Israeli Politics and the First Palestinian Intifada (2007 hardback ed.). Abingdon: Routledge. ISBN 978-0-415-38560-2.
- Aronson, Geoffrey (1990). Israel, Palestinians, and the Intifada: Creating Facts on the West Bank. London: Kegan Paul International. ISBN 978-0-7103-0336-3.
- Ben-Ami, Shlomo (2006). Scars of War, Wounds of Peace. New York: Oxford University Press. ISBN 978-0-19-518158-6.
- Berman, Eli (2011). Radical, Religious, and Violent: The New Economics of Terrorism. MIT Press. p. 314. ISBN 978-0-262-25800-5.
- Finkelstein, Norman (1996). The Rise and Fall of Palestine: A Personal Account of the Intifada Years. Minnesota: University Press. ISBN 978-0-8166-2858-2.
- Hiltermann, Joost R. (1991). Behind the Intifada: Labor and Women's Movements in the Occupied Territories (1993 reprint ed.). Princeton, N.J: Princeton University Press. ISBN 978-0-691-07869-4.
- King, Mary Elizabeth (2009). "Palestinian Civil Resistance against Israeli Military Occupation". In Stephan, Maria J. (ed.). Civilian Jihad: Nonviolent Struggle, Democratization, and Governance in the Middle East. Palgrave Macmillan. pp. 131–155. ISBN 978-0-230-10175-3.
- King, Mary Elizabeth (2007). A Quiet Revolution: The First Palestinian Intifada and Nonviolent Resistance. New York: Nation Books. ISBN 978-1-56025-802-5.
- Lockman, Zachary; Beinin, Joel, eds. (1989). Intifada: The Palestinian Uprising Against Israeli Occupation. Cambridge, MA: South End Press. ISBN 978-0-89608-363-9.
- McDowall, David (1989). Palestine and Israel: The Uprising and Beyond. California: University Press. ISBN 978-0-520-06902-2.
- Morris, Benny (1999). Righteous Victims: a History of the Zionist-Arab conflict, 1881–1999. New York: Knopf. ISBN 978-0-679-74475-7.
- Nassar, Jamal Raji; Heacock, Roger, eds. (1990). Intifada: Palestine at the Crossroads. New York: Praeger Publishers. ISBN 978-0-275-93411-8.
- Peretz, Don (1990). Intifada: The Palestinian Uprising. Boulder, Colorado: Westview Press. ISBN 978-0-8133-0860-9.
- Rigby, Andrew (1991). Living the Intifada. London: Zed Books. ISBN 978-1-85649-040-5., out-of-print, now downloadable at civilresistance.info
- Roberts, Adam; Garton Ash, Timothy, eds. (2009). Civil Resistance and Power Politics: The Experience of Non-violent Action from Gandhi to the Present. Oxford: University Press. ISBN 978-0-19-955201-6.
- Shay, Shaul (2005). The Axis of Evil: Iran, Hizballah, and the Palestinian Terror. Transaction Publishers. ISBN 978-0-7658-0255-2.
- Schiff, Ze'ev; Ya'ari, Ehud (1989). Intifada: The Palestinian Uprising: Israel's Third Front. New York: Simon & Schuster. ISBN 978-0-671-67530-1.
- Shalev, Aryeh (1991). The Intifada: Causes and Effects. Jerusalem: Jerusalem Post & Westview Press. ISBN 978-0-8133-8303-3.
- Shlaim, Avi (2000). The Iron Wall: Israel and the Arab World. London: Penguin. ISBN 978-0-14-028870-4.
- Ron, Jonathan (2006). The Two Intifadas- An Analysis of the Strategies and Tactics of the Palestinians and the Israelis. The Fletcher School
