= Fahd Plan =

The Fahd Peace Plan, also known as the Fahd Peace Initiative and Fez Initiative, was a peace proposal presented by then Saudi Crown Prince Fahd of Saudi Arabia in 1981 and officially submitted during the Arab League summit in Morocco's city of Fez in November that year.

Possibly the first bid to solve the conflict following the Egypt–Israel Peace Treaty in 1979, the plan was designed to resolve the Arab–Israeli conflict and establish lasting peace in the region.

Made by eight-point proposal, the plan has suggested that "all states in the region should be able to live in peace in the region." Within its provisions, it was included Israeli withdrawal from "all Arab territory occupied in 1967", including Arab Jerusalem, dismantling of Israeli settlements built on "Arab land" after 1967, a "guarantee of freedom of worship for all religions in Holy Places", an "affirmation of the right of the Palestinian Arab people to return to their homes and compensation for those who do not wish to return", and the creation of an "independent Palestinian State" with Jerusalem as its capital and putting the West Bank and the Gaza Strip under the "auspices of the United Nations for a period not exceeding several months".

== Eight Point Peace Plan ==
The points of the Peace Plan:

1. Israel to withdraw from all Arab territory occupied in 1967, including Arab Jerusalem.
2. Israeli settlements built on Arab land after 1967 to be dismantled, including those in Arab Jerusalem.
3. A guarantee of freedom of worship for all religions in the Holy Places.
4. An affirmation of the right of the Palestinian Arab people to return to their homes and compensation for those who do not wish to return.
5. The West Bank and the Gaza Strip to have a transitional period under the auspices of the United Nations for a period not exceeding several months.
6. An independent Palestinian State should be set up with Jerusalem as its capital.
7. All States in the region should be able to live in peace in the region.
8. The United Nations or Member States of the United Nations to guarantee the carrying out of these provisions.

== Presentation and reactions ==
The Fahd Peace Plan was presented at the 8th Arab League summit in Fez, Morocco, in November 1981, and it sparked disagreements among the parties. It was only during the sessions of the 12th summit of the organization, held again in Fez in September 1982, that the proposal was endorsed as the Fez Initiative, after including a reference to the Palestine Liberation Organization, and it became the official position of the Arab states regarding the conflict.

However, the Israeli government at the time, led by Menachem Begin, did not accept the plan and rejected its provisions.

Nevertheless, the Fahd Peace Plan laid a foundation for further discussions on peace in the Middle East and influenced other peace initiatives in the region, such as the 2002 Arab Peace Initiative, which also aimed at a comprehensive solution to the Israeli-Palestinian conflict.

== See also ==
- List of Middle East peace proposals
