= Days of Rage: The Young Palestinians =

1989 documentary

- Directed by: Jo Franklin-Trout

Original release
- Network: PBS
- Release: 1989

Days of Rage: The Young Palestinians is a documentary film produced by Jo Franklin-Trout about Palestinian views on the Israeli occupation, first aired on PBS in 1989. The film stirred controversy in the United States.

== Production ==
The documentary was filmed in the occupied territories in the summer of 1988, during the First Intifada.

== Broadcast ==
After months of delays, the film was first broadcast on September 6, 1989, by about 300 PBS stations throughout the US. Kenneth Bialkin, president of New York's Jewish Community Relations Council, and other members of the JCRC described the film as "anti-Israeli propaganda." After an agreement between WNET-TV and Bialkin and other Jewish leaders, the 90-minute film was aired with an hour of "wraparound" programming designed to "counterbalance the film's anti-Israeli stance," including a panel discussion with Seymour Reich, James Zogby, Richard Murphy, and Walter Ruby. The 2 ½ - hour program aired under the title "Intifada: The Palestinians and Israel."

== Reception ==
The New York Times published on August 31, 1989, before the film was aired nationally on PBS in September, that "screenings of ''Days of Rage'' around the United States have provoked protests from Jewish and human-rights organizations. Many journalists, though, have said the film, while biased, presents information about the uprisings not easily available to American television viewers."
