= Beit Sahour tax strike =

1989 strike in the First Intifada

The Beit Sahour tax strike was a tax strike by the residents of the Palestinian town of Beit Sahour in 1989. Part of the First Intifada, the strike was proclaimed with slogans of "no taxation without representation" and "must we pay for the bullets that kill our children?" The Israeli government acted to crack down on the strike, seizing property from town residents, placing residents under administrative detention, and eventually imposing a 42-day blockade on the town.

== Background ==
After Israel's victory in the Six-Day War in 1967, Israel has occupied the Palestinian territories, including the West Bank. The occupation has been controversial, with Israel accused of violating international law, as well as committing human rights abuses and apartheid against Palestinians. The Israeli government has also actively promoted the creation and growth of Israeli settlements in Palestine. The First Intifada was the largest wave of Palestinian unrest since the beginning of the Israeli occupation, mostly consisting of protests, strikes, boycotts, and acts of civil disobedience, and breaking out across Palestine in December 1987 after four Palestinians were killed when an Israeli truck driver ran them over.

Beit Sahour is a majority Christian town in the Palestinian West Bank, often linked to the annunciation to the shepherds during the Nativity of Jesus. The town has been a site of tensions in the Israeli-Palestinian Conflict, including as a target for Israeli settlement and as a target of Israeli demolition of Palestinian property. The town also played a key role during the First Intifada.

== Events ==
=== Tax strike ===
Following the outbreak of the First Intifada in December 1987, a number of Palestinians began organising tax strikes, refusing to pay taxes to the Israeli Civil Administration. Beit Sahour became one of the towns in which the tax strike was most comprehensively organised, with almost all residents taking part, refusing to pay income tax or VAT. The town council released a statement in support of the strike directed towards the Israeli government saying that "for 20 years of occupation you thought we were satisfied, and then came the intifada to tell you that we want our freedom and that not paying taxes is a form of nonviolent resistance to your occupation" and declaring that "by treating us as a colony of Israel you are practicing taxation without representation."

There were, however, some debates within the town over the strike. The Marxist–Leninist Popular Front for the Liberation of Palestine threatened several residents who made moves to voluntarily pay the Israeli Civil Administration and disrupted one meeting of merchants in late-October that had been called to discuss whether the town should negotiate with the Civil Administration.

=== Israeli blockade ===
On 20 September 1989, the Israeli military moved to crack down on the strike by surrounding the town, declaring it a "closed military zone," and placing it under blockade. Israeli Minister of Defence Yitzhak Rabin pledged that "If it takes a month, it will take a month but they will break. We are going to teach them a lesson."

During the blockade, the Israeli military imposed curfews on the population, cut off the telephone lines and town utilities, and blocked residents from leaving and non-residents, including journalists and diplomats, from entering. The military also seized over one and a half million dollars' worth of possessions from the residents of Beit Sahour, including workshop machinery and products, home furniture, home decorations, home appliances, cars, clothes, washing machines, and televisions. The seized possessions were held in a warehouse in Ben Gurion Airport before being auctioned off. As well, 40 merchants in the town were arrested and indicted. The Israeli military also spread leaflets around the town saying that the residents would go hungry once the media lost interest in the strike.

According to Anne Grace of the American Friends Service Committee, the Israeli military also used human shields during the blockade, saying that "while carrying out the confiscations, the IDF would stop passing cars and require the drivers to form a ring around the house, using their automobiles as a protective shield. Then, the drivers-along with passing men, women, and children as well as neighbors-would be rounded up and ordered to stand outside the ring of cars throughout the 'operation.'" Grace also claimed that Israeli soldiers would humiliate parents in front of their children and that some of the possessions the Israeli military seized included children's toys.

In mid-October, when Fatah West Bank leader Faisal Husseini called a press conference at the Palace Hotel in East Jerusalem to discuss the strike, the Israeli military ordered the streets around the hotel shut to prevent journalists from attending the press conference. Mayor of Jerusalem Teddy Kollek criticised the closure, saying that the Israeli military had not notified him about the closure and that he didn't know if the press conference posed an immediate danger. On 19 October, the Israeli military briefly sealed off the nearby city of Bethlehem to prevent a demonstration being held in sympathy. Later in October, the Israeli military blocked a congregation of bishops representing the Roman Catholic, Greek Orthodox, and Armenian churches in Jerusalem who had come to bring food from entering the town. Latin Patriarchate of Jerusalem Michel Sabbah criticised the military's refusal to let the bishops enter, saying that the situation in the city "not acceptable to any churchman or any spiritual man who has a human conscience" and that "our visit was an act of pastoral duty to our people, who expect to hear a word of comfort."

British Consul-General in Jerusalem Ivan Callan, on the other hand, managed to sneak into the town without Israeli approval. On 30 October, the Israeli military allowed a group of seven, mostly left-wing, MKs to enter Beit Sahour, on condition that the MKs not speak to the media afterwards. The seven MKs were Avraham Burg, Aryeh Eliav, Amir Peretz, Yossi Sarid, David Zucker, Haim Oron, and Avraham Poraz.

On 31 October, after five weeks, the Israeli military lifted the blockade. In lifting the blockade, the military claimed that it had successfully defeated the strike and had recouped the value of the unpaid taxes in seized property. The town's residents, on the hand, claimed that had successfully seen off the blockade with only a small number of residents choosing to break the strike and voluntarily pay taxes to the Israeli authorities, while claiming that the town had become an internationally seen symbol of non-violent resistance to the Israeli occupation.

=== Post-blockade ===
The military re-sealed the town on 1 November, for seven hours. A demonstration in support of the tax strike on 5 November, which saw 2000 participants, was forcibly dispersed by the military.

== Reactions ==
=== In Palestine ===
Fatah West Bank leader Faisal Husseini praised Beit Sahour as "the city that leads nonviolent struggle."

Raji Qumsille, a furniture maker in Beit Sahour, was quoted by the Washington Post as saying that "everyone in Beit Sahour is happy because the Israeli leadership promised it would break Beit Sahour. But Beit Sahour didn't break. We didn't pay our taxes." Nasser abu Ayta, a video rental store owner, was quoted by the Los Angeles Times during the strike as complaining that Israeli forces "come in as if they own us." Beit Sahour Mayor Hanna Al-Atrash claimed that the strike was "a success for us and a failure for the army."

=== In Israel ===
Israeli Civil Administration head Yeshayahu Erez stated that the Israeli government "accomplished what we wanted and more," saying that it had successfully "enforced the law and asserted our authority in Beit Sahur" and pledging to continue to collect taxes from "Judea and Samaria, and where necessary, we will collect them by force." Ratz MK David Zucker echoed Erez in saying that the blockade was "a contest over who is the sovereign in Beit Sahur," but unlike Erze, stated that "it hasn’t been proved that Israel is the real sovereign in Beit Sahur."

Brigadier General Ephraim Lapid claimed that the "PR battle" was one that Israel could not win, saying that "the Arab culture has no problem in spreading distortions and lies" and that media focused on the most sensational glimpses of events, pointing towards the Beit Sahour tax strike, in which he claimed that media "failed to mention was the background to the curfew — that for several months the inhabitants of Beit Zahour refused to pay taxes." Ze'ev Schiff of Haaretz claimed that "Beit Sahur has become a symbol, a Palestinian flag" and that "Palestinians won a media victory and the town is more consolidated than ever."

Israeli Customs Authority director Mordechai Bareket stated that if he "tried to use within [Israel proper] some of the means in the territories as a way of increasing collection, they would hang me in Zion Square."

=== Internationally ===
In an editorial, The Australian Jewish News stated that the Israeli government managed to "prove the pointlessness of a tax revolt" and described the slogan of "no taxation without representation" as "PR hokum. An offer of representation under Israel rule would make no difference to the Palestinians," but stated that there was "little to suggest that Israel’s iron fist has effectively bent the people of Beit Sahur, or the Palestinians generally, to its occupying will." George Martin and James Manney of Commonweal claimed that "the intent of Israel seems to go beyond merely collecting taxes due and to carrying out a determined effort to suppress any organised dissent to the occupation, however nonviolently it may be carried out."

On 7 November 1989, the United Nations Security Council held a vote on a motion condemning the Israeli government's handling of Beit Sahour. The motion failed, with fourteen of the fifteen Security Council members voting in favour and the United States voting against, using its veto power. When addressing the Security Council during the debates on the motion, Permanent Representative of Israel to the United Nations Yohanan Bein claimed that taxes on Palestinians were "used solely to finance the provision of services for the Palestinian residents of Judea, Samaria and Gaza, such as health, education and welfare" and that the motion "ignores completely the premeditated and cold-blooded murder of 150 Palestinians at the hands of the PLO." United States ambassador to the United Nations Thomas R. Pickering argued that the motion was "one-sided" and was intended to "exacerbate tensions and distract the parties from the critical issues that need to be addressed in the region."

== Aftermath ==
The First Intifada would continue until 1991. In 1993, the first of the interim Oslo Accords peace accords between the PLO and the Israeli government would be signed.

== Legacy ==
Writing in support of the Boycott, Divestment and Sanctions movement in 2013, American-Palestinian journalist Ramzy Baroud stated that "Beit Sahour took the strategy of civil disobedience — refusing to pay taxes, boycotting the Israeli occupation and all of its institutions — to a whole new level," calling the town a "focal point of collective action and boycott" during the First Intifada.

== In popular culture ==
In 2014, the Palestinian-Canadian animated documentary film The Wanted 18 was released, depicting the efforts of some Beit Sahour residents to establish a dairy collective during the strike.

== See also ==
- List of historical acts of tax resistance
