= Scars of War, Wounds of Peace =

2005 book by Shlomo Ben-Ami

Scars of War, Wounds of Peace: The Israeli–Arab Tragedy is a book by historian and former Israeli Foreign Minister Shlomo Ben-Ami, which examines the history of the Arab–Israeli conflict.

The book is notable for the challenges it offers to many of Israel's founding myths and also for its severe appraisals of Israeli policies over the half century before its publication. According to Ian Black, the point the book makes is that "the Palestine conflict is a tragedy, not a crime, though crimes have been committed by both sides".

== Publication history ==
- Ben-Ami, Shlomo (2005). Scars of Wars, Wounds of Peace: The Israeli–Arab Tragedy, Weidenfeld & Nicolson, 354 pages.
- Ben-Ami, Shlomo (2006). Scars of Wars, Wounds of Peace: The Israeli–Arab Tragedy, Oxford University Press USA, 368 pages, ISBN 0-19-518158-1 (hardcover).
- Ben-Ami, Shlomo (2007). Scars of Wars, Wounds of Peace: The Israeli–Arab Tragedy, Oxford University Press USA, 432 pages, ISBN 0-19-532542-7, ISBN 978-0-19-532542-3 (paperback).
