= Shlomo Ben-Ami =

Israeli diplomat, politician and historian

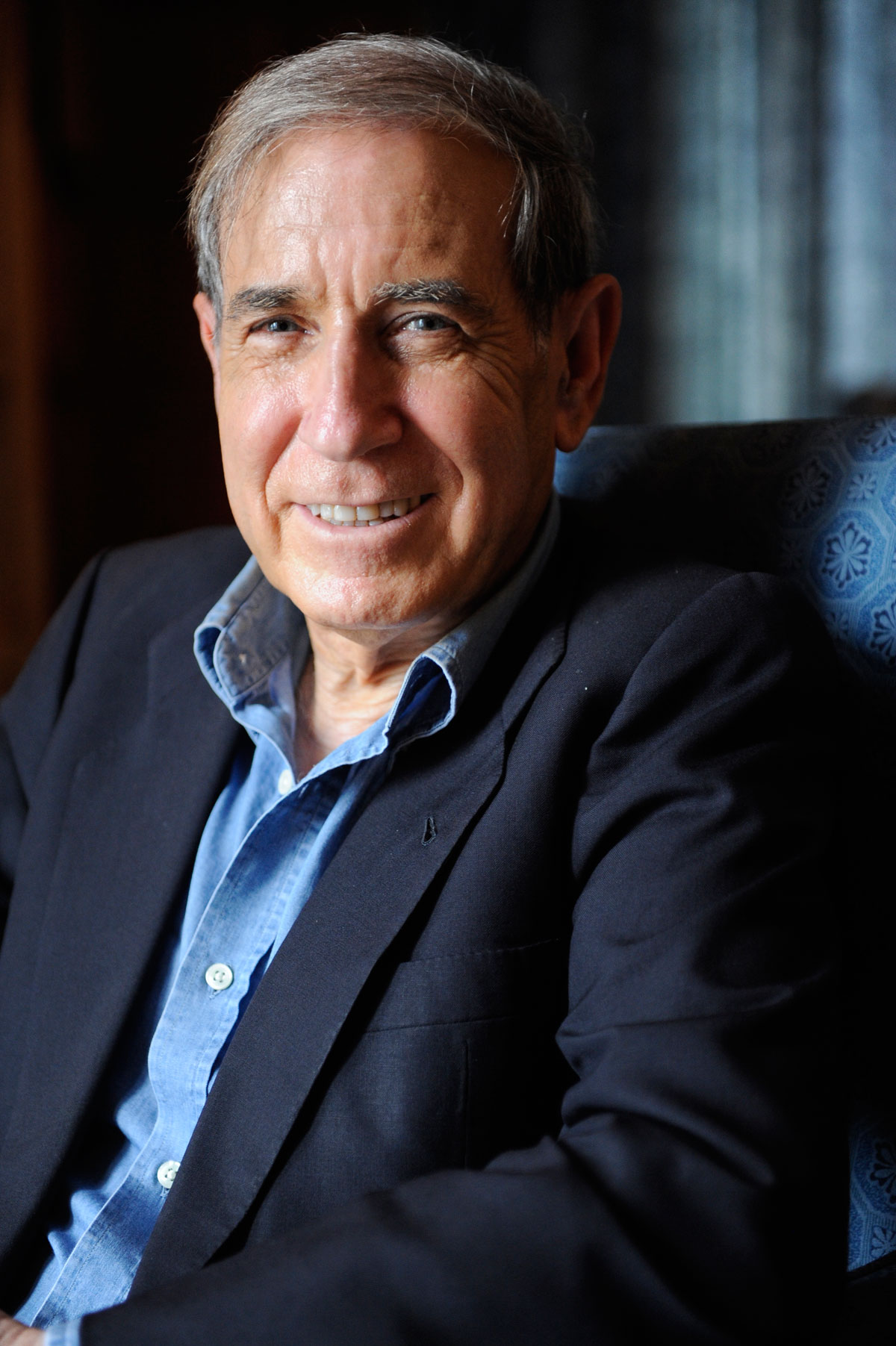

Ministerial roles
- 1999–2001: Minister of Internal Security
- 2000–2001: Minister of Foreign Affairs

Faction represented in the Knesset
- 1996–1999: Labor Party
- 1999–2001: One Israel
- 2001–2002: Labor Party

Personal details
- Born: 17 July 1943 (age 83) Tangier International Zone (during the Spanish occupation of Tangier)

Shlomo Ben-Ami (Hebrew: שלמה בן עמי; born 17 July 1943) is an Israeli retired diplomat, politician, and historian who participated in the Israeli–Palestinian peace process, including the 2000 Camp David Summit.

== Biography ==
Shlomo Benabou (later Ben-Ami) was born in Assilah (which was then under Spanish occupation), Morocco to Moroccan Jewish parents. He immigrated to Israel in 1955. He was educated at Tel Aviv University and St Antony's College, Oxford from which he received a D.Phil. in history. Ben-Ami speaks fluent Hebrew, Spanish, French, and English.

== Academic career ==
He was a historian at Tel Aviv University from the mid-1970s, serving as head of the School of History from 1982 to 1986. His initial field of study was Spanish history; his 1983 biography of the former Spanish dictator (1923–30), General Primo de Rivera, is recognized as the most authoritative study on this subject. He later turned his attention to the history of Israel and the Middle East, leaving a legacy of expertise in Spanish interwar politics.

== Diplomatic and political career ==
Before he entered politics, he was the Israeli ambassador to Spain from 1987 until 1991. In 1996, he was elected to the Knesset on the Labour Party's list.

When the One Israel-led government of Ehud Barak took office in July 1999, Ben-Ami became the Minister of Internal Security, responsible for the Israel Police. In August 2000, when David Levy resigned as Foreign Minister during talks with Palestinian leaders in the United States, Barak designated Ben-Ami to be the acting Foreign Minister and he was officially appointed to the role in November 2000.

Ben-Ami remained Foreign Minister and Security Minister until March 2001, when, having won the prime ministerial elections, Ariel Sharon took over from Barak. Ben-Ami refused to serve in the Sharon government and resigned from the Knesset in August 2002.

In their report published in 2003, the Or Commission held him responsible for the behavior of security forces during the October 2000 riots in which Israeli police killed 12 Israeli Arabs and one Palestinian, and failed to predict and control rioting which resulted in the death of a Jewish Israeli. The report recommended that Ben-Ami be disqualified from serving as Internal Security Minister in the future. Despite the disqualification, Ben-Ami was not considered to be a hard-liner in Israeli relations with the Palestinians and during his time in the Barak government, he was a political rival of Shimon Peres.

As of 2016, Ben-Ami is vice-president of the Toledo International Centre for Peace (TICpax), which, according to its mission statement, "seeks to contribute to the prevention and resolution of violent or potentially violent international or intranational conflicts and to the consolidation of peace, within a framework of respect and promotion of Human Rights and democratic values."

Ben-Ami is the author of Scars of War, Wounds of Peace: The Israeli–Arab Tragedy (Oxford, 2006), which challenges many of the founding myths in Israel's modern history, especially those related to the war of independence. His latest book is Prophets without Honor: The 2000 Camp David Summit and the End of the Two-State Solution (Oxford, 2022). Ben-Ami backed the Meretz party for the 2009 legislative election.

== Later career ==
As of 2012, Ben-Ami is vice president of the Toledo International Centre for Peace of which he is a co-founder. Through the center, he has been involved in conflict resolution processes such as among others, in Colombia, Dominican Republic (the tensions with Haiti), Bolivia (intercultural issues), Russia-Georgia, Libya; Spanish Sahara, and Israel-the Arab world. In 2016, he was the co-chair (together with ex-chief of Mossad Efraim Halevi) of an Israeli commission for strategic planning. He has lectured extensively in international conferences in Europe, Russia, the U.S. and Latin America. He is a regular contributor to Project Syndicate since 2006.

In March 2026, Ben-Ami wrote an article in The Korea Times stating that the war in Iran launched by the United States and Israel is a violation of and illegal under international law and said that the war has a "lack of any clear or achievable objective".

== Opinion on conflict and two-state solution ==
In a 2006 interview on Democracy Now!, Ben-Ami described how his perspective differs from that of the New Historians:

My view is that, but for Jesus Christ, everybody was born in sin, including nations. And the moral perspective of it is there, but at the same time it does not undermine, in my view, in my very modest view, the justification for the creation of a Jewish state, however tough the conditions and however immoral the consequences were for the Palestinians. You see, it is there that I tend to differ from the interpretation of the new historians. They have made an incredible contribution, a very, very important contribution to our understanding of the origins of the state of Israel, but at the same time, my view is that this is how — unfortunately, tragically, sadly — nations were born throughout history.

He goes on to describe his perspective on the goal of the peace process and its outcome:

And our role, the role of this generation—this is why I came into politics and why I try to make my very modest contribution to the peace process—is that we need to bring an end to this injustice that has been done to the Palestinians. We need to draw a line between an Israeli state, a sovereign Palestinian state, and solve the best way we can the problem, by giving the necessary compensation to the refugees, by bringing back the refugees to the Palestinian state, no way to the state of Israel, not because it is immoral, but because it is not feasible, it is not possible. We need to act in a realistic way and see what are the conditions for a final peace deal. I believe that we came very, very close to that final peace deal. Unfortunately, we didn't make it. But we came very close in the year 2001.

In 2025, during the Gaza war, he stated in a New York Times interview that

"I don't see any possibility whatsoever of a two-state solution. There is too much history here now and too little geography."

== Published works ==
- Spain between Dictatorship and Democracy: 1937-1977 (Am Oved, 1977) (in Hebrew)
- The Origins of the Second Republic in Spain (Oxford University Press, 1978).
- Historia del Estado de Israel -junto a Zvi Medin- (Ediciones Rialp, 1981).
- Fascism from Above: Dictatorship of Primo de Rivera in Spain, 1923–1930 (Oxford University Press, 1983)
- Italy between Liberalism and Fascism (1986)
- Anatomia de una Transición [Anatomy of a Transition] (1990) (in Spanish)
- Quel avenir pour Israël? [Which Future for Israel?], (Presses Universitaires de France, 2001) (Hachette Littérature 2002), ISBN 2-01-279104-2. (in French)
- A Front Without a Homefront: A Voyage to the Boundaries of the Peace Process (Yedioth Ahatonoth, Tel-Aviv, 2004).
- Scars of War, Wounds of Peace: The Israeli–Arab Tragedy (Oxford University Press 2006), ISBN 0-19-518158-1.
- Prophets Without Honor: The 2000 Camp David Summit and the End of the Two-state Solution. Oxford University Press. 2022. ISBN 978-0-19-006047-3.
