= Jennifer Leaning =

American health scholar

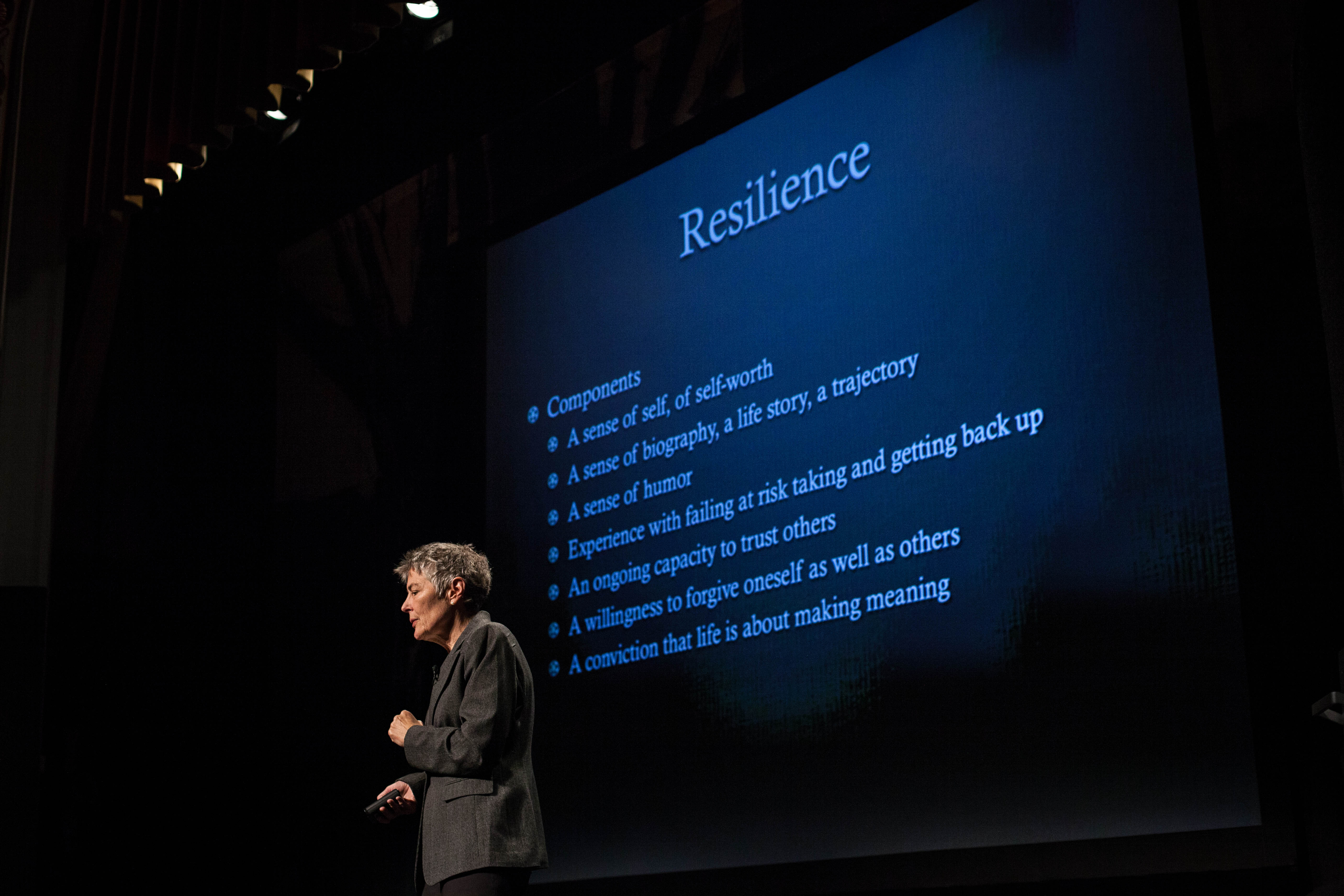

Academic background
- Education: Radcliffe College
- Alma mater: University of Chicago Pritzker School of Medicine

Academic work
- Discipline: Health and Human Rights
- Institutions: Harvard T.H. Chan School of Public Health

Jennifer Leaning is an American health scholar currently the François-Xavier Bagnoud Professor of the Practice of Health and Human Rights at Harvard T.H. Chan School of Public Health and former Editor-in-Chief of the International Physicians for the Prevention of Nuclear War's Medicine & Global Survival. She is also Associate Professor of Medicine at Harvard Medical School and a faculty member in the Department of Emergency Medicine at Brigham and Women’s Hospital.

== Education ==
Dr. Leaning earned her B.A. magna cum laude from Radcliffe College, her masters of science from Harvard School of Public Health, and her M.D. with honors from the University of Chicago Pritzker School of Medicine. She trained in internal medicine at Massachusetts General Hospital and is board certified in emergency and internal medicine.

== Book ==
- Humanitarian Crises: The Medical and Public Health Response, published by Harvard University Press in 1999.
- After the Tsunami - Facing the Public Health Challenges. (2005)
- American Red Cross & Public Health: The Response to Hurricane Katrina and Beyond. (2006)

== External websites ==
- Publications of Dr. Jennifer Leaning
- Harvard T.H. Chan School of Public Health Faculty profile website for Dr. Jennifer Leaning
- FXB Center for Health and Human Rights Faculty profile website for Dr. Jennifer Leaning
- HCSPH Department of Global Health and Population Faculty profile website for Dr. Jennifer Leaning
- Harvard Humanitarian Institute (HHI) Faculty profile website for Dr. Jennifer Leaning
- Harvard Catalyst Faculty profile website for Dr. Jennifer Leaning
- International State Crime Initiative profile for Dr. Jennifer Leaning
