= 1988 Shultz Initiative =

American peace initiative

The 1988 Shultz Initiative was a peace initiative by United States Secretary of State George Shultz to resolve the Israeli–Palestinian conflict in early 1988.

While the American government under Ronald Reagan had largely abandoned its attempts to resolve the conflict after the failure of the Reagan peace plan in the early 1980s, the outbreak of the Palestinian First Intifada and the international outcry over the Israeli government's attempts to suppress the uprising in late 1987 prompted Shultz to renew Americans peace efforts. After a tour to the Middle East in February 1988, Shultz would formally propose a new peace initiative:

1. An international peace conference would be held in the spring of 1988 to begin negotiations, including all five Permanent members of the United Nations Security Council and all parties involved in the Arab-Israeli conflict, and without any power to enforce an agreement on the parties;
2. That negotiations should be based on United Nations Security Council Resolution 242 and United Nations Security Council Resolution 338;
3. A further independent round of negotiations would then be held between Israel and a joint Jordanian-Palestinian delegation over the establishment of an interim self-government for Palestinians in the occupied territories;
4. By the end of 1988, before the interim Palestinian autonomy was implemented, negotiations over the final status of the occupied Palestinian territories would begin;
5. The interim Palestinian autonomy would last for three years before implementation of the final status.

Despite carrying out extensive shuttle diplomacy in the spring of 1988, Shultz's initiative largely failed to garner any significant buy-in from the governments involved, with only the Egyptian government of Hosni Mubarak endorsing the initiative. The governments of Jordan, under King Hussein, and Syria, under Hafez al-Assad, both endorsed the idea of an international peace conference, but were reluctant to support the specifics of Shultz's proposal, accusing the American government of prioritising Israel's demands over a genuine peace effort. The Israeli government never reached a consensus on the initiative, with bitter infighting between the Likud cabinet members led by Prime Minister Yitzhak Shamir (who opposed the ideas of an international peace conference and "land for peace") and the Israeli Labor Party members led by Minister of Foreign Affairs Shimon Peres (who supported the initiative and the idea of the Jordanian option). Palestinians were only marginally involved in the negotiations, and both the Palestine Liberation Organisation and the Unified National Leadership of the Uprising opposed the initiative due to its lack of direct Palestinian representation and fears that it would harm the momentum of the Intifada.

== Background ==
=== Previous American peace initiatives ===
In 1978, American President Jimmy Carter mediated the singing of the Camp David Accords between Israeli Prime Minister Menachem Begin and Egyptian President Anwar Sadat, consisting of the Egypt–Israel peace treaty and the Framework for Peace in the Middle East. The Egypt-Israel peace treaty normalised relations between the two countries, guaranteed Israeli ships free passage through the Suez Canal, demilitarised the Sinai Peninsula, and saw the withdrawal of the Israeli occupation of the Sinai Peninsula, including the withdrawal of Israeli settlers in the Sinai. The Framework for Peace in the Middle East called for the establishment of a Palestinian autonomous authority based on United Nations Security Council Resolution 242 and further negotiations between Israel, Egypt, and the Kingdom of Jordan. The Framework for Peace in the Middle East, however, was negotiated without Palestinian involvement and Begin stated that "on no condition will there be a Palestinian state." The Framework was consequently rejected by the Palestine Liberation Organisation and the Palestinian autonomy talks between Israel, Egypt, and Jordan made little progress.

In 1981, Ronald Reagan assumed the presidency of the United States. At first, Reagan,s administration largely viewed the Israeli-Palestinian conflict as a minor front of the Cold War in the Middle East, with Israel as an American ally in the Middle East and the PLO as a Soviet ally. As such, his administration prioritised strengthing Israeli military capacities and containing the PLO over pushing for a resolution to the Israeli-Palestinian conflict. Following the 1982 Israeli invasion of Lebanon, however, a domestic outcry against the destruction during the siege of Beirut prompted Reagan's administration to play a more active role as a peace mediator. His administration proposed the Reagan peace plan, which would establish interim Palestinian autonomy culminating in a federation with Jordan. The plan was immediately rejected by the Israeli government under Menachem Begin, who described it as "a serious danger to Israel, its security and its future." After several months of intensive debate, the PLO's Palestinian National Council ultimately voted to reject the plan as well, demanding a fully independent Palestinian state that could then enter into a federation with Jordan as equals.

Following the failure of the Reagan plan, Reagan's administration largely abandoned its efforts to mediate peace between Palestine and Israel through the mid-1980s. In 1985, the PLO and the Jordanian government announced the Palestinian-Jordanian Joint Action Agreement based on the Reagan Plan, however, the agreement collapsed in part after the American and Israeli governments refused to participate in subsequent negotiations due to the inclusion of PLO members within the joint Jordanian-Palestinian delegation. Other started peace negotiations in the mid-1980s prior to the First Intifada, such as the Peres–Hussein London Agreement and the Amirav-Husseini peace meetings, were undertaken without American involvement and also resulted in failure.

=== Outbreak of the First Intifada ===
In early December 1987, an Israeli truck accidentally crashed into a line of Palestinian cars at the Erez Crossing in northern Gaza, resulting in the deaths of four Palestinian workers. The accident, and rumours that it had been a deliberate attack in retaliation for the murder of an Israeli salesman in Gaza several days earlier, sparked a wave of rioting and unrest across the occupied Palestinian territories. By mid-January 1988, the unrest had coalesced into a popular Palestinian uprising against the Israeli occupation led by the PLO-affiliated Unified National Leadership of the Uprising (UNLU), who advanced a strategy of civil disobedience, including boycotts, refusal to pay taxes, strike action, as well as the formation of cooperatives and underground classrooms. The Israeli response to the unrest and subsequent uprising sparked international controversy, with several dozen Palestinians having been shot and killed by Israeli forces by the end of January 1988, and several cases of unarmed protestors having been beaten.

== History ==
=== Prelude ===
When the truck accident occurred in Gaza, the American government's foreign policy focus was on the Washington Summit between American President Ronald Reagan and Soviet leader Mikhail Gorbachev, during which they signed the Intermediate-Range Nuclear Forces Treaty. Through mid-December 1987, the American government would remain relatively quiet on the growing unrest in the occupied Palestinian territories, although the United States Department of State privately urged the Israeli government to reduce its use of live ammunition against rioters. By late December 1987, the American government began to publicly criticise the Israeli government's approach, while also criticising Palestinian rioters, including abstaining on United Nations Security Council Resolution 605. At the same time, the American government faced some controversy over the effects of the Anti-Terrorism Act of 1987, signed into law by Reagan on 22 December 1987, which would close the PLO's observer mission to the United Nations.

On 5 January 1988, the United States would vote in favour of United Nations Security Council Resolution 607, the first American vote in favour of a resolution criticising the Israeli government since the early 1980s. Several days later, United States Secretary of State George Shultz gave a speech calling for an international peace conference between Israel and Arab governments, saying that "the whole history of the Middle East shows that violence — terrorism, war — just has not worked. It is negotiations that work," while reaffirming that "Israel is a democratic country seeking stability and peace and the ability to pursue its destiny, and we support that country and we support those objectives and we work closely with Israel." By late January 1988, Shultz and the State Department had begun more concrete internal debates on proposing a new peace initiative for the Arab-Israeli and Israeli-Palestinian conflicts. According to David K. Shipler of The New York Times, writing on 22 January 1988, the American government was facing pressure from the Egyptian government, the Soviet government, and the Israeli Labor Party (whose leader, Shimon Peres, was serving as Israeli Minister of Foreign Affairs) to make a more active push for peace, and also had growing concerns over the Israeli government's recently announced Force, might, and beatings policy to subdue the unrest. At the same time, according to Shipler, State Department officials were concerned that Israeli Prime Minister Yitzhak Shamir showed no signs of being willing to drop his opposition to an international peace conference and that King Hussein of Jordan was still reluctant to enter a new peace initiative after the failure of the Peres–Hussein London Agreement in the spring of 1987.

Before the end of January 1988, Shultz would welcome Egyptian President Hosni Mubarak to Washington to discuss the situation in the Middle East. During Mubarak's visit, Shultz stated that he remained "convinced that direct face-to-face negotiation is the best way to achieve results, and we will pursue any avenue to get to that point, including an international conference." Shultz would also meet with Hanna Siniora and Fayez Abu Rahmeh, two Palestinian moderates, after the Israeli government agreed to lift a travel ban on the two. During the meeting, Siniora and Abu Rahmeh pressed Shultz to include the PLO in peace negotiations, saying that PLO chairman Yasser Arafat was willing to negotiate with the Israeli government, to which Shultz stated that the PLO would need to formally accept United Nations Security Council Resolution 242 and United Nations Security Council Resolution 338 first. Siniora and Abu Rahmeh would also present Shultz with a list of fourteen steps they wished to see the Israeli government take to reduce tensions, including allowing municipal elections to be held in the occupied Palestinian territories, the release of those arrested since the start of the unrest, removal of the value-added tax charged by the Israeli government inside the occupied territories, and decriminalising contacts with the PLO. In late January, Shultz would also meet with Israeli Cabinet Secretary Elyakim Rubinstein and World Zionist Organization chairman Simcha Dinitz. As well, American diplomat Philip C. Habib, who had participated in the Camp David Accords negotiations, was sent by the American government to Jordan to meet with King Hussein.

=== Preparations for a new peace initiative ===
By early February 1988, news organisation were reporting that Shultz was preparing to formally propose a new peace initiative. Neil Lewis of The New York Times quote an anonymous American official on 2 February that the initiative would be centered around "some kind of interim arrangement that would give the Palestinians a stake in their future," while quoting another as saying that "we don't have anything ready to jump off the ground, but we're interested in moving quickly for the Palestinians, providing something in the near future." Howard Rosenberg of the Jewish Telegraphic Agency reported on 3 February that "while it has been widely reported that the initiative calls for interim local autonomy measures for Palestinians in the West Bank and Gaza Strip, there has been no official description from spokespersons at the State Department or White House," while noting that the United States had vetoed a new UN Security Council resolution criticising the Israeli government's handling of the unrest. It was also reported that King Hussein of Jordan had indicated that he would potentially be willing to entertain such a peace initiative, particularly as the Jordanian was growing increasingly concerned that the unrest might spill over into the Kingdom of Jordan, which was host a large population of Palestinian refugees and officially claimed sovereignty over the West Bank.

In mid-February, American Assistant Secretary of State for Near Eastern and South Asian Affairs Richard W. Murphy would undertake an official visit to Egypt and Israel. According to David Landau of the Jewish Telegraphic Agency, Murphy's visit would be key to determining whether Shultz would continue with his potential proposal, which would be based on an accelerated version of the Camp David Accords, while noting that the potential proposal was receiving support from Peres and the Israeli Labor Party but was facing opposition from Shamir and Likud. Following Murphy's visit, American State Department official Phyllis E. Oakley stated that "We think some progress has been made. There is a lot of work to do and we’re working on it." Peres stated that "the string of ideas that Mr. Murphy brought is far from final - a lot of details are missing," but that "as far as I'm concerned, however, anything is welcome." Shamir, on the other hand, rejected Murphy's ideas, complaining that "How can I negotiate when my partner is constantly running to the other side and telling them, 'Don't listen to Shamir; whatever he's selling, I'll sell cheaper'?" While the PLO was not involved in the visit or negotiations, PLO spokesperson Ahmad Abdel Rahman stated that "we reject and will resist this plan and our people will continue their uprising until they achieve self-determination and an independent state." The Unified National Leadership of the Uprising, also not involved in the negotiations, also stated its opposition to the plan, deeming it a "conspiracy," and called for demonstrations against it. By that point, at least 53 Palestinians had been killed by Israeli forces since the start of the unrest.

Following Murphy's return to the United States and debriefing with Shultz, Shultz announced that he would personally undertake a visit to the Middle East before the end of the month, with plans to visit Israel, Egypt, and Jordan to discuss a possible peace initiative. In the following days, internal debates among Israelis, Palestinians, and other involved parties would strongly intensify. The Likud and labor members of the Israeli government remained deeply split over the idea of an international peace conference. Yasser Arafat gave a speech to the United Nations Commission on Human Rights in which he indicated that the PLO would be willing to accept UN Security Council resolutions 242 and 338, while also vowing to "continue to resist the occupation with waves and waves of unrest until we get our goal." Arafat was also reported to have given approval for a group of six moderate Palestinians (including Siniora and Abu Rameh) to meet with Shultz during his visit, but after divisions within the PLO, between the PLO and the UNLU, and within the UNLU, the approval was dropped.

=== First Shultz visit to the Middle East ===
On 25 February 1988, Shultz arrived in Israel to begin his tour of the Middle East. Upon his arrival, the Israeli government had yet to reconcile their differences, with both Likud and the Labor Party indicating that they were ready to dissolve their coalition. The night before his arrival, during a stopover in Brussels, Shultz admitted that "I don’t think many people give me much chance," but stated that "the engagement of the U.S. in the Mideast on an intense basis is welcomed."

Upon landing at the Ben Gurion International Airport in Tel Aviv, Shultz was greeted by Peres. Together, they held a press conference in which Shultz stated that "the status quo in the region is not a stable option for any of the parties," declaring that because "friendship and ties between Israel and the U.S. have never been so strong," the "time is right, together, to make decisions of historic proportions." In the press conference, Peres described the situation as "a most demanding period of our life, facing probably the most complicated issue of the day." Shamir, on the other hand, gave an interview to Yedioth Ahronoth in which he stated that "the timing is not particularly good for anything" and that it was "clear that this expression of territory for peace is not accepted by me." When Shultz met with Shamir during his visit, Shamir reiterated his opposition to an international peace conference and to ceding any parts of the West Bank and Gaza Strip, while warning that any steps towards those two points would be interpreted as a victory by the PLO. Shultz also offered to meet with several prominent Palestinians, however, all those he invited refused to attend. When the meeting was due to be held, Shultz held a press conference at the American Colony Hotel, where he gave "a statement to Palestinians," in which he called for Palestinians to be "active participants in the negotiations to determine their future." PLO chairman Yasser Arafat subsequently stated that the PLO was willing to meet with Shultz, but only if the PLO could chose which Palestinians attended the meeting, saying that "we do not accept that the American, or any other administration, choose who represents us." A general strike was declared by the UNLU in the occupied Palestinian territories in protest over Shultz's visit.

Following his meetings in Israel, Shultz left to Syria, where he met with Minister of Foreign Affairs Farouk al-Sharaa and President Hafez al-Assad, his first visit to Syria since 1983. He then travelled to Jordan, where he met with Prince Hassan bin Talal and Prime Minister Zaid Rifai. Both the Syrian and Jordanian governments told Shultz that they wanted an international peace conference that included the PLO. He then travelled to Egypt, where the Egyptian government became the first to indicate that it backed Shultz's initiative.

Shultz ended his Middle East tour without any concrete achievements, however stated that "If I had to describe the situation, I would say that nobody has signed up to our proposals but everybody wants us to keep working, so we'll keep working." As he left Israel, he stopped in London, where he met with King Hussein of Jordan (who was in the UK for medical treatment).

After conferring with Reagan, who was in Brussels to attend a NATO summit, Shultz announced that he would return to the Middle East in the following days for another round of meetings. Reagan stated that it was "clear that all countries in the region believe it is useful for the United States to remain engaged in this process," pledging to "spare no effort in our search for a comprehensive peace settlement." Shultz's announcement sparked further controversy in Israel, as Shamir indicated that he was willing to call a general election over the issue of the negotiations, while Peres accused Shamir of trying to "sabotage the peace process." Before returning to the Middle East, Shultz held another meeting with King Hussein, after which Shultz indicated that the meeting had gone well, while also reiterating his opposition to including the PLO in negotiations until the PLO officially accepted UN Security Council resolutions 242 and 338.

=== Formal peace initiative proposal ===
On 4 March 1988, following his brief return to the Middle East, Shultz sent official letters to Israel Prime Minister Yitzhak Shamir and King Hussein of Jordan formally detailing a new peace initiative proposal. Among the details were:

1. An international peace conference would be held in the spring of 1988 to begin negotiations, including all five Permanent members of the United Nations Security Council and all parties involved in the Arab-Israeli conflict, and without any power to enforce an agreement on the parties;
2. That negotiations should be based on United Nations Security Council Resolution 242 and United Nations Security Council Resolution 338;
3. A further independent round of negotiations would then be held between Israel and a joint Jordanian-Palestinian delegation over the establishment of an interim self-government for Palestinians in the occupied territories;
4. By the end of 1988, before the interim Palestinian autonomy was implemented, negotiations over the final status of the occupied Palestinian territories would begin;
5. The interim Palestinian autonomy would last for three years before implementation of the final status.

=== Initial debates over Shultz's initiative ===
Shultz requested that the Israeli government decide on its response to his initiative by 15 March 1988, when Prime Minister Shamir was due to undertake a pre-planned state visit to the United States. Shamir, however, stated that the Israeli cabinet would only hold its vote on the initiative after his return from the state visit, pledging to "attempt to attain changes which will better suit our interests" during his visit. In a speech to the Knesset, Peres warned that "we may lose this historic opportunity. Neither we nor the next generations will be able to answer why we were panic-stricken by the idea of peace," while Likud member and Minister for Housing David Levy warned that "We can’t fool ourselves with the idea that the plan doesn’t exist and that we can succeed in changing its principles significantly in Washington."

Upon Shultz's return to the United States in early March 1988, after having formally presented his proposal, a group of thirty senators presented him with an open letter supporting his initiative and criticising Shamir, saying that "peace negotiations have little chance of success if the Israeli Government's position rules out territorial compromise." The open letter was spearheaded by Democrat Carl Levin and Republican Rudy Boschwitz, and was signed by senators including Ted Kennedy, Mitch McConnell, John Kerry, and Daniel Patrick Moynihan. Shamir responded to the letter by saying that he could not understand "the reasons for your criticism, which hurts even more because it comes from friends who have Israel’s security and welfare at heart," pledging that his government was committed to the Camp David Accords and that the status of the occupied Palestinian territories could only be decided through negotiations, not via an Israeli withdrawal as with the Egyptian Sinai Peninsula. In a United States House Appropriations Subcommittee on Foreign Operations, Export Financing and Related Programs hearing on 11 March, Shultz warned that the occupied Palestinian territories presented "a very large, clearly ticking demographic time bomb - many, many people who are disenfranchised and who are there. And in some manner or another, that problem must be dealt with. It cannot be ignored," while also warning that "we live now in the world of the missile. And missiles that go further and further and are more and more accurate are becoming more and more common. Security, of course, will always have to reflect defensible borders and arrangements of that kind. But when somebody who's a long way away from you can inflict very, very damaging blows, then your concept of defense has to be different, and I think, fundamentally, that concept has to be one of seeking peace in the neighborhood."

In mid-March, PLO chairman Yasser Arafat, who was not involved in the negotiations, gave an interview to The New York Times in which he stated that he opposed the initiative due to the lack of independent Palestinian and PLO representation, exclaiming that "Mr. Shultz said he is coming to solve the Palestinian problem, the whole issue between the Palestinians and the Israelis. He contacted everybody except the Palestinians. Everybody!" In the interview, he further indicated that he would be willing to accept the idea of "land for peace" and "all United Nations resolutions," saying that "Peace needs courageous men. We are waiting for the other side. Are they ready? Or are they following this stupid Israeli military junta?" PLO political department head Faruq al-Qaddumi would meet with several European governments during this period to outline the PLO's rejection of the initiative. On 12 March, the Anti-Terrorism Act of 1987 controversy came to a head when United States Attorney General Edwin Meese officially ordered the PLO mission to the United Nations shut.

On 13 March, the Syrian government announced that it had decided to reject the initiative, with Minister of Foreign Affairs Farouk al-Sharaa stating that the initiative "as presented to us, is not acceptable." By that date, at least 86 Palestinians had been killed since the start of the Intifada.

The day before Shamir left Israel for his state visit to the United States in mid-March, Israeli activist group Peace Now organised a significant rally in the Malkhey Yisrael Square, Tel Aviv, urging Shamir to accept Shultz's initiative. The rally was attended by tens of thousands of Israelis. Tel Aviv University faculty members and students also held a 90-minute strike in support of the initiative. A demonstration opposing the initiative organised by the far-right Gush Emunim movement later that evening, however, attracted a significantly larger audience. Minister for Housing David Levy was one of the speakers at the rally, declaring that Shamir was leaving "on a fateful trip. You must explain to the people and the Administration of the United States we don’t want to commit suicide," with Minister for Trade Ariel Sharon declaring in his own speech that "we must make clear to the United States we will not be pressured into giving up our vital security interests." An opinion survey for Israeli newspaper Hadashot that week found that 46% of Israelis were in favour of the idea of "land for peace," while 37% opposed the idea.

=== Yitzhak Shamir state visit to the United States ===
On 14 March 1988, Israeli Prime Minister Yitzhak Shamir arrived in the United States for his official state visit. First landing at John F. Kennedy International Airport in New York City, he held a brief press conference there, during which he stated that "I don’t think Israel will ever talk with the PLO," before heading to Washington, D.C.. In Washington, he held brief meetings with Shultz and United States Secretary of Defense Frank Carlucci, before giving a speech to the United Jewish Appeal in the evening during which he described the Intifada as "not demonstrations. It is not sit-ins. It is not civil disobedience. It is war. And it is not a war for Judea, Samaria and Gaza. It is not a war for a Palestinian state in those areas. It is a war against Israelis, against the existence of the state of Israel. But I promise you, they will fail again."

After further meetings the next day, Shultz told the media that the visit was so far "very constructive and worthwhile," but that "we have not found a way to bridge all of the differences." That day, American President Ronald Reagan pledged that "Peace will not be imposed by us or by anyone else. It will and must come from the genuine give-and-take of negotiations." Shamir's spokesperson Avi Pazner reiterated Shamir's opposition to an international peace conference, describing it as "a way for the enemies of Israel to put pressure on Israel to try to get Israel to agree to solutions it would not agree to in free negotiations."

Shamir would leave Washington on 17 March without any agreement having been reached between him and Shultz. The result of the visit was widely seen as a victory for Shamir, with Scott Macleod of Time Magazine writing that "the performance, given by a wily veteran of guerrilla warfare, was a tactical masterpiece," and David Landau of the Jewish Telegraphic Agency writing that Shamir "has good reason to be pleased with his talks with Reagan administration officials in Washington last week. He did not waver from his opposition to an international conference or the accelerated timetable for negotiations proposed by Shultz. If anything, the administration backed off." David K. Shipler of The New York Times wrote that "after all the creative linkages and interlocking schedules that State Department officials thought up for this new initiative, the debate has been returned to its earlier form - a dispute over a conference," saying that "Shamir was so unyielding in raising objections to most of the main proposals that American officials were unable to cite any points that seemed susceptible to negotiation."

=== Further debates and negotiations ===
Upon his return to Israel, Shamir convinced the Israeli cabinet to further delay its vote on Shultz's initiative. He would also address the Likud caucus, saying that "We are in the midst of a battle in the administered territories and the struggle against the Shultz initiative," and accusing Shultz of wanting to reduce Israel to "dwarf size." The split between the Likud and Labor Cabinet members grew acrimonious, with one anonymous Cabinet official telling the press after a meeting that the atmosphere had become "very tense and snappy. Peres walked out of the room at one point." The Israeli government would also step up its crackdown on the Intifada, arresting at least 700 Palestinians in the days following Shamir's return.

On 26 March, Shultz met with two prominent Palestinian-American scholars and members of the Palestine National Council, Edward Said and Ibrahim Abu-Lughod, in a meeting endorsed by the PLO. During the meeting, Said and Abu-Lughod stressed that the PLO would need to be directly involved in peace negotiations as the representative of the Palestinian people. While they afterwards stated that Shultz "is not yet ready to accept the participation of the PLO in an international peace conference at this time," they affirmed that Shultz had told them Palestinians should be involved in negotiations and described the meeting as "a step forward in current American efforts and policy." The Israeli government issued a formal protest over the meeting, accusing the American government of breakings its 1975 memorandum of understanding with Israel not to talk with PLO members unless certain conditions were met, saying that being an independent member of the PNC (like Said and Abu-Lughod were) was equivalent to being a member of a PLO.

Shultz would meet with Soviet Foreign Minister Eduard Shevardnadze in late March 1988, following Shamir's state visit to the United States, to discuss the initiative, with Shevardnadze telling Shultz that the Soviet Union wished the five UN Security Members to have the power to impose a solution during an international peace conference.

Before the end of the month, following a briefing with American diplomat Philip C. Habib (who had spent the preceding days visiting several Arab states), Shultz announced that he would make a second visit to the Middle East in April. Assistant Secretary of State for Public Affairs Charles E. Redman stated that "no one has said no" to the initiative, and that it was "still on the table. People are actively and seriously considering it." Briefing the press before his trip, Shultz stated that "the idea of a Palestinian state is just not in the cards," calling instead for a Jordanian-Palestinian association, and repeated that "I think it’s a very important idea that we are not going to talk to and negotiate with the PLO."

By 1 April 1988, at least 112 Palestinians had died since the start of the Intifada.

=== Second Shultz visit to the Middle East ===
Shultz arrived in Israel on 3 April 1988 to begin his second visit to the Middle East. Upon his arrival, he reaffirmed his commitment to the idea of "land for peace" and United Nation Security Council Resolution 242, saying that there was "no place at the negotiating table for those who cannot accept that resolution as the basis for negotiations, and no place for those who practice terrorism or deny Israel's right to exist," and warned that there had been too many "missed opportunities" for peace in the Middle East. Shamir stated that "I look very simply with skepticism to all those prophesies of the talks having this or that solution or breakthrough," while Peres stated that "Whoever agrees with the need for a real peace effort will certainly agree with your efforts for peace." The Israeli cabinet had yet to reach a formal decision on whether to support or oppose the initiative.

On 4 April, Shultz held separate meetings with Shamir and Peres. The meeting with Shamir ended without any significant movement towards an agreement. Shultz subsequently visited Jordan and Syria, meeting with King Hussein and President Assad. Neither the Jordanian nor Syrian governments offered Shultz support for his plan. According to Elaine Sciolino of The New York Times, senior Jordanian officials told journalists after Hussein's meeting with Shultz that the King was "disheartened by the vagueness of Mr. Shultz's approach and his apparent willingness to take Israel's concerns much more seriously than those of Jordan," specifically naming a comment by Shultz during the meeting saying that Israel would not have to return to its pre-1967 borders.

The Palestinian UNLU, not involved in any of the negotiations, declared a general strike in the occupied territories in protest over Shultz's visit. During Shultz's visit, the PLO would intervene in the case of Kuwait Airways Flight 422, hijacked on 5 April by Lebanese militants, to press for the release of the passengers in what was described by American journalist Roberto Suro as an attempt to "boost the P.L.O.'s prestige at a time when it is trying hard to win a role in the Middle East peace initiative being conducted by Secretary of State George P. Shultz." Jewish settler groups would hold protests outside the homes of several Israeli officials calling for the government to stop meeting with Shultz. During Shultz's visit, the Beita incident would occur in the West Bank, resulting in the death of 15-year-old Israeli settler Tirza Porat, the first Israeli civilian, and second Israeli overall, to die inside the occupied Palestinian territories since the start of the Intifada. At least 122 Palestinians had died at that point.

Shultz ended his second visit to the Middle East on 8 April without any agreement. He admitted that "differences have not been substantially narrowed," but pledged to "continue our efforts for peace. When you are down in the trenches doing it, you certainly are aware of how hard it is. But that does not lessen in any way the importance of continuing the effort."

=== Further negotiations ===
Following Shultz's departure from the Middle East, Monte Carlo Doualiya reported that a senior Jordanian government had told them that King Hussein had no more interest in negotiating over the future of the West Bank and would only participate in negotiations if they concerned matters within Jordan proper, such as the Israeli occupation of parts of the Arabah.

In a mid-April meeting with PLO chairman Yasser Arafat, Soviet leader Mikhail Gorbachev publicly told Arafat that "recognition of the State of Israel, consideration of its security interests, the solution of this question is a necessary element in the establishment of peace and good-neighborliness in the region based on principles of international law." Soviet officials would also meet with one of Peres' advisors in April to discuss the Shultz initiative.

On 16 April 1988, the Israeli military would assassinate Khalil al-Wazir, a co-founder of Fatah and the second-in-command of the PLO. The assassination was widely perceived by international governments as a setback for Shultz's initiative. American Assistant Secretary of State for Public Affairs Charles E. Redman stated that "This kind of violence is not going to be part of the solution. The solution is going to come through a negotiated settlement, through a political process that works toward a comprehensive peace. That's what our proposal is aimed at, and we intend to continue pressing that as hard as we can." The Israeli government's decision several weeks later to arrest and deport Mubarak Awad, a Palestinian-American advocate of non-violence, was also perceived internationally as a setback for Shultz's initiative, with Shultz personally intervening to try and prevent the deportation.

On 21 April, Israel would celebrate the 40th anniversary of its independence. That day, Shamir and Reagan would sign an agreement formalising a previously issued memorandum of understanding on strategic cooperation between the two states. The White House's statement on the agreement declared that "the president knows that a strong Israel is necessary if peace is to be possible. He also knows that Israel can never be truly secure without peace" and that "the president remains convinced that our peace initiative is balanced and offers the only realistic basis on which to make progress."

On 24 April, Arafat undertook an unexpected state visit to Syria, following mediation led by the Algerian and Libyan governments, with goal of mending diplomatic relations between the PLO and Assad and to discuss Shultz's initiative. Some Middle East analysts, including Martin Indyk and Daniel Pipes, warned that the visit would present difficulties to Shultz's initiative.

In mid-May, Peres undertook a state visit to the United States, during which he held several meetings with Shultz. That month, Peres indicated that he was willing the issues of peace and the Intifada the key part of the Labor Party's platform in the upcoming 1988 Israeli legislative election, due in November, despite opinion polls showing a shift in Israeli preferences towards Likud and Labor falling behind. According to Joel Brinkley of The New York Times, "everyone in Mr. Peres's camp acknowledges that the Foreign Minister is taking a great political risk by basing his campaign around such an emotional and volatile issue ... The Shultz plan has gone nowhere, though no one is quite willing to pronounce it dead. The United States made no effort to penalize Israel for opposing the plan, and so 'Shamir is a hero,' a Peres aide said, shaking his head with frustration. 'He stood up to the United States at no cost,' he added. 'It's bad for us.'"

During the Moscow Summit between the United States and the Soviet Union at the end of May 1988, Shultz discussed the issue of his initiative with the Soviet government. During the Summit, Gorbachev indicated that the Soviet Union might be willing to warm relations with Israel, saying that as soon as an international peace conference "starts working, we would be prepared to address ourselves to the question of diplomatic relations with Israel," adding that "we proceed from the assumption that the people of Israel, the State of Israel, have the right to their own security, because there can be no security for one at the expense of another," while also calling for the PLO to be allowed to represent Palestinians at such a conference.

=== Third Shultz visit to the Middle East and final end to the initiative ===
On 3 June, following the Moscow Summit, Shultz returned to the Middle East for his third visit to promote his initiative. White House Press Secretary Marlin Fitzwater admitted that the American government was "not particularly optimistic" over the visit's chances of success, and that the visit might be the last Shultz would make to the region. Upon his landing in the Middle East, Shultz declared that "the fate of Zionism and Palestinian nationalism are interdependent, although many on both sides refuse to recognize this," calling for all sides to "lay aside prejudices, hatred and overblown dreams in favor of a negotiated settlement." The Palestinian UNLU, not involved in the negotiations, declared a general strike over Shultz's visit and the coinciding 21st anniversary of the Six-Day War, issuing a communiqué accusing Shultz of trying to "continue with his conspiracy aimed at aborting the uprising."

In early June, the 1988 Arab League summit was also held, with the Intifada as the only topic of discussion. Although the summit refused to condemn Shultz's plan, Secretary General of the Arab League Chedli Klibi stated the initiative was irrelevant "since Israelis had rejected it." During the summit, King Hussein declared that "the United States has no Middle East policy other than support for Israel."

At the end of July 1988, the Jordanian government announced that it would permanently renounce its claims over the West Bank and would recognise only the PLO as the legitimate government of the Palestinian people. The move was widely perceived as ending any chances of Shultz's plan succeeding, as a joint Jordanian-Palestinian delegation in a peace conference now seemed impossible. Despite the Jordanian announcement, Shultz attempted to convince King Hussein to continue with his plan, but stated that the American government would be willing to start negotiating with the PLO if it took "certain steps, which are very clear and, as far as I can see, not too onerous."

American Assistant Secretary of State for Near Eastern and South Asian Affairs Richard W. Murphy would make a visit to the Middle East in mid-August. Following Murphy's meetings with Shamir and Peres, an Israeli Ministry of Foreign Affairs official told the press that "It's clear to the United States and to Israel that nothing will happen in the peace process until after November," when the Israeli elections and American president elections were due. Later that month, the Anti-Terrorism Act of 1987 controversy was finally resolved after the American government decided not to contest a court ruling that the PLO mission to the United Nations should be allowed to maintain its office in New York.

In mid-September, Shultz declared that the American government would oppose any unilateral "declaration of independent Palestinian statehood or government in exile," describing it as a "unilateral act" and repeating his call for an international peace conference, amid growing rumours that the PLO was considering such a move. Later that month, Reagan would hold a meeting with Peres and Egyptian Minister of Foreign Affairs Ahmed Asmat Abdel-Meguid in New York to commemorate the 10th anniversary of the Camp David Accords. No breakthroughs were made during the meeting on an international peace conference. During his stay in New York, Peres would also address the United Nations General Assembly to call for an international peace conference, while indicating for the first time that he might be prepared to directly negotiate with the PLO if it explicitly renounced violence, asking "For how long can a desire for peace be treated as a secret password, as though we are living in clandestine surroundings? Commitment to peace must emerge loud and clear, for skeptics to witness, for the hopeful to respond to?"

=== Last weeks of Shultz's term as United States Secretary of State ===
On 1 November 1988, the 1988 Israeli legislative election was held, resulting in another hung parliament and a continuation of the grand coalition between Likud and Labor. A few days later, the 1988 United States presidential election was held. Shultz would leave his position as Secretary of State when the incoming president, George H. W. Bush, took office in January 1989. He would be replaced by James Baker. An official for the Egyptian government, the only Middle Eastern government that had explicitly supported Shultz's initiative, reacted to the election results by saying that "Bush has three choices. He can try to revive the terms of the Shultz initiative, he can do nothing, which would be dangerous, or he can come up with new ideas of his own and start a new initiative. We would like some new ideas."

Later in November 1988, the Palestinian National Council would adopt the Palestinian Declaration of Independence, establishing the PLO as a Palestinian government-in-exile. The declaration of independence was met with near-unanimous condemnation in Israel, including from both Shamir and Peres, condemnation from the American government, and with applause from the UNLU. Following the declaration, Shultz would block Arafat from entering the United States to address the United Nations General Assembly, saying that the declaration wasn't explicit enough in its recognition of the State of Israel. In early December, Arafat would meet with a group of prominent American Jews in Stockholm, explicitly telling them that the PLO both accepted the State of Israel's right to exist and renounced terrorism. Shultz stated that the American government would need further clarification from the PLO. In mid-December, Arafat would finally address the UN General Assembly in a special session held in Geneva, during which he reiterated the PLO's acceptance of the State of Israel's right to exist and the PLO's renunciation of violence. Following the speech, the American government would open direct negotiations with the PLO for the first time in history.

== Reactions ==
=== Among Palestinians ===
Popular Front for the Liberation of Palestine leader George Habash opposed the initiative, saying "It is fine to say we should end the uprising and talk peace, but give me something to work with, not this Shultz proposal. Even Palestinian collaborators are refusing to meet with Mr. Shultz."

Former Mayor of Hebron Mustafa Natshe stated: "Shultz is sending letters to Shamir, to Hussein, to Assad. But where is the letter to Yasir Arafat?" Bassam Abu Sharif, a senior advisor to Arafat, argued that "the key to a settlement lies in talks between the Palestinians and the Israelis. The Palestinians would be deluding themselves if they thought their problems with the Israelis could be solved in negotiations with non-Israelis, including the United States. By the same token, the Israelis - and U.S. Secretary of State George Shultz, who has been shuttling to the Middle East for discussions on his peace proposals - would be deluding themselves if they thought that Israel's problems with the Palestinians could be solved in negotiations with non-Palestinians."

=== Among Israelis ===
The initiative was opposed by many of Israeli Prime Minister Yitzhak Shamir's supporters as well as by a significant number of senior Israeli officials. One senior defence official quoted by The New York Times in late February 1988, described by the newspaper as a moderate, stated that the Intifada "can go on indefinitely" without seriously endangering Israeli security, as there had yet to be any Israeli deaths, and therefore the government would make "a major mistake by giving up basic political positions as a result of the disturbances." MK and former Minister of Defence Moshe Arens stated that the idea of "land for peace" was "no new magic formula for an end to wars and hatred in the Middle East. In the 20th century, it has been tried four times, each time cutting the Jewish domain in size without bringing the Jews the peace they so badly desire," saying that "for Israel to make concessions before negotiations have begun makes no sense at all." Likud MK Uzi Landau stated that "the Arabs have found that unrest is a sharp and harmful weapon that splits the Jews of Israel. They won’t give it up just because there is an international peace conference." Benjamin Netanyahu, who resigned as Permanent Representative of Israel to the United Nations in March 1988 to run for the Knesset as a Likud candidate, accused Shultz of being "influenced by all sorts of Arabist officials in the State Department," and described the initiative as "very dangerous."

Supporters of Israeli Minister of Foreign Affairs Shimon Peres and other Israeli officials, on the other hand, supported the initiative. Nimrod Novik, an adviser to Peres, stated that "I dread the day that we face an American public fed up with what it sees on TV, an American Congress fed up with what it sees on TV, a new American Administration picking up the pieces if this peace initiative does not succeed." Former Israeli Minister of Foreign Affairs Abba Eban argued in late February 1988 that "if there is a mutual self-interest in changing a certain condition, the hour is objectively ripe for negotiation, and Secretary of State Shultz's timing is well chosen," saying that "Israel and the United States should join in understanding that what matters is the present attitudes, and not the past biographies, of Palestinian leaders," and that if Palestinians "refuse to consult with Mr. Shultz, they will be true to their worst tradition of never having lost a chance to miss an opportunity."

A group of 620 Bar-Ilan University faculty and students would sign an open letter in late March 1988 calling for the Israeli government to negotiate directly with the PLO.

The initiative was opposed by many on the far-right of Israeli politics. Kach supporter Avigdor Eskin stated that "There is only one way to restore peace, and that is the transfer of the Arab population to Arab countries." MK Geula Cohen of Tehiya stated that "this is a war, like every war, with Syria, with Egypt," saying that Arabs "translate our moral weakness as a physical weakness, and we instead of weakening them are encouraging them." The initiative was also opposed by many Israeli settlers. Ron Nachman, the founder of the settlement of Ariel, stated that "When Mr. Shultz is speaking about withdrawing or giving up land, it's ridiculous. He should come here and see. We've put up 140 settlements and cities, mostly in the last 10 years. We start with small settlements and grow and grow."

=== Among Americans ===
American President Ronald Reagan stated before Shultz's February trip to the Middle East that an Israeli-Palestinian peace deal "would be one of the greatest achievements of this administration," while claiming that American intelligence indicated that "there’s every evidence that these riots are not just spontaneous and home-grown." American Vice-president George H. W. Bush stated that he "strongly supported" Shultz's initiative.

Governor of Massachusetts Michael Dukakis stated in mid-March that it was "unfortunate that the Administration has waited for seven years to really get serious about trying to play a leadership role," while supporting the initiative. Former American president Richard Nixon spoke in support of Shultz, saying that "what Israel has to understand is that for their own interests they should make the deal now," while rejecting "this idea that Israel should give up all of the occupied territory."

Democrat Senator Al Gore opposed the initiative, saying that Shamir's objections "deserve a full hearing," specifically stating Shamir's claims that the proposal would contradict the Camp David Accords, while adding that "I think it's awkward for the United States to appear to force a conference on an unwilling ally - particularly when the Soviet Union's role is as unclear as I think it is thus far." Senate Minority Leader Bob Dole opposed the idea of an international peace conference, saying that he was "not inclined to reward the Soviets' destructive policies in the Middle East." Former American Secretary of State Henry Kissinger criticised Shultz's initiative, saying that an international peace conference would be "the most dangerous forum for Israel; it is the most dangerous forum for the United States; and it can only wind up with the United States being caught between all parties and Israel being pressured in a direction that it cannot respect."

A mid-April 1988 opinion poll by The Los Angeles Times found that over 60% of American Jews supported Shultz's initiative, bu that only 43% supported the idea of Israel withdrawing from the West Bank and Gaza Strip. Conference of Presidents of Major American Jewish Organizations chair Morris B. Abram agreed with Shultz that "there has got to be some change from the status quo," saying that "Israel wants peace, has wanted peace for 40 years, seeks peace, but needs a partner." The March 1988 biennial conference of the American Jewish Congress voted to support the initiative, saying that "the status quo in the Middle East cannot realistically be maintained and morally ought not to be maintained," and warning that "demographic imperatives will force Israel to choose between becoming a non-Jewish state or a non-democratic state." The American Federation of Ramallah, which represented 25 000 Palestinian-Americans with roots in Ramallah, called for Palestinians to be "treated as people, not as a refugee problem," adding that "we support the P.L.O., but we don't all agree with it any more than every American agrees with President Reagan or the current makeup of the Congress."

=== Internationally ===
According to Elaine Sciolino of The New York Times, writing in April 1988, "the perception in much of the Arab world is that Mr. Shultz's initiative is motivated by his eagerness to guarantee Israeli security and not by his concern for the Palestinians."

Soviet Deputy Foreign Minister Vladimir Petrovsky stated in February 1988 that although an international peace conference was urgently necessary, the Soviet Union could not support Shultz's initiative as Shultz's proposed conference would not have the power to actively enforce any agreements.

In late February 1988, British Minister of State for Foreign Affairs David Mellor, who was visiting several Gulf countries at the same time as Shultz's visit to the Middle East, stated that "the primary responsibility at this time to offer the hand of peace and a promising basis for a peace conference lies with the Israelis," adding that "as long as Shamir appears to be blocking any move toward an international conference and refuses to accept that discussions should be based on territory for peace, there can be no progress." In mid-March, a group of seven prominent British and American Jewish scholars, including Isaiah Berlin and Immanuel Jakobovits, Baron Jakobovits, co-authored an open letter supporting the initiative, warning that continued opposition would "sooner or later lead to moral and political disaster." The G7, at its 14th summit in June 1988, endorsed Shultz's initiative, with Canadian Secretary of State for External Affairs Joe Clark stating that an international peace conference was "the appropriate framework for the necessary negotiations between the parties directly concerned" and that "the current violence in the occupied territories is a clear sign that the status quo is not sustainable."

== Assessments ==
=== Factors influencing the involved governments ===
According to Israeli-British historian Avi Shlaim, the outbreak of the Intifada led to concerns among American officials "that close American association with Israel despite its defiance of world opinion could have negative repercussions for American interests throughout the Middle East and the Persian Gulf."

According to Rex Brynen of McGill University, King Hussein of Jordan "found himself in a difficult position" when it came to Shultz's initiative, as the King had no mandate from the PLO to speak for Palestinians and the Intifada made his claims to have jurisdiction over the West Bank even weaker, and the Shultz initiative was effectively the same proposal as the Camp David Accords, which Hussein had rejected in the 1970s.

=== Position of Palestinians in the initiative ===
American political analyst Kathleen Christison wrote upon Shultz's retirement in 1989 that Shultz "has left behind a dismal record in the Middle East." Christison argued that he failed to understand the causes of the First Intifada, believing even as the unrest broke out in December 1987 that Palestinian frustrations could be solved by American aid money and private investment instead of the establishment of an independent Palestinian state, saying that "in the middle of a Palestinian popular revolt, Shultz's continued refusal to let Palestinians speak for themselves was unrealistic and a virtual guarantee of failure." William B. Quandt of the Brookings Institution stated in April 1988 that "The biggest flaw in the Shultz proposal is the way he deals with Palestinian representation. It's very much implied in his proposal that the Palestinians are an afterthought."

Aryeh Shalev of the Jaffee Center for Strategic Studies argued in 1992 that "the very fact that [the Shultz initiative] was undertaken, in the final year of the Reagan administration, constituted something of an achievement for the uprising. This success, coming against the background of a relaxation in tensions between the superpowers and attendant developments in other regions, signaled the incipient translation of the uprising into a political achievement. The culmination of that achievement occurred when the world’s leading power, the United States — which is in a position to exercise a great deal of influence on Israel due to the latter’s immense dependence upon it — concluded that the intifada had generated a new situation in the Middle East which it could not ignore."

American academic Paul Pierpaoli Jr. has argued that the initiative "set the stage for important developments in the Middle Eastern peace process. By laying out the exact conditions under which the United States would engage with the PLO, the Shultz plan forced a lively internal debate among PLO factions and their leaders. The plan, in fact, had given PLO chairman Yasser Arafat the opportunity to seize the initiative and overcome hardline resistance within the organisation," leading to the November 1988 Palestinian Declaration of Independence and the start of US-PLO dialogue. Matthew Lee of The Times of Israel wrote upon Shultz's death in 2021 that although Shultz "could not get serious peacemaking on track," he ultimately "shaped the future by legitimizing the Palestinian Arabs as a people with a defensible stake in determining their future."
