= 1988 Yasser Arafat speech to the United Nations General Assembly =

In mid December 1988, Palestine Liberation Organisation chairman Yasser Arafat gave a significant speech to the United Nations General Assembly elaborating on the Palestinian Declaration of Independence that had been proclaimed in mid November 1988. As a result of Arafat's speech, the government of the United States of America began direct negotiations with the PLO for the first time.

== History ==
=== Prelude ===
In mid November 1988, the Palestinian National Council formally proclaimed the Palestinian Declaration of Independence.

=== United States visa controversy ===
Before the end of November, the American government announced that it would refuse Arafat a visa, effectively preventing him from being able to address the United Nations General Assembly in New York.

In its official statement explaining the decision, the Department of State said that the American Congress had agreed to the 1947 agreement hosting the UN in New York City (and the subsequent duty to allow rights of transit for people invited to the UN) on the condition that the American government would retain the power to bar people thought to pose a danger to American security. The Department of State said that, while it had routinely issued visas to PLO representatives following the UN's decision to grant observer status to the PLO, there was "convincing evidence that P.L.O. elements have engaged in terrorism against Americans and others" in recent years, including by Fatah organisations like the Fatah Special Operations Group and Force 17, as well as noting the participation of the Palestinian Liberation Front (responsible for the Achille Lauro hijacking) in the PNC, meaning that Arafat "condones and lends support to such acts; he therefore is an accessory to such terrorism." The Department of State continued by saying that "the United States firmly believes that Palestinian political rights must be recognized and addressed," saying that the Palestinian Declaration of Independence contained "encouraging" signs, but that "no participant in a peace process can wave the flag of justice in one hand and brandish the weapons of terrorism in the other."

The decision attracted international controversy. The United Nations Office of Legal Affairs argued that the United States was obliged to grant Arafat a visa as the American government had no evidence that Arafat was planning to engage in any terrorist-related activities during his trip to the United States, saying that the precedent established by Dag Hammarskjöld in the 1950s was that the American government's power to refuse a visa could only be based on "clear and convincing evidence that a person intended in bad faith to use his or her trip as a cover for activities against that country's security."

The decision received domestic support in the United States. The majority of senators signed an open letter authored by Republican Chuck Grassley and Democrat Dennis DeConcini applauded Shultz "for the courage you showed in articulating this issue."

=== Stockholm meeting and speech ===
On 6 December 1988, before addressing the UNGA, Arafat and several other senior PLO leaders arrived in Sweden on an official visit. According to Ed Magnuson of Time Magazine, "Swedish diplomats have a tradition of mediating between Arabs and Jews that goes back to Count Folke Bernadotte and U.N. Special Representative Gunnar Jarring. Last September was the 40th anniversary of Bernadotte’s assassination in Jerusalem, and many Swedes were enraged when two former members of the ultra-Zionist Stern Gang went on Israeli television and boasted about their part in the killing. The incident may have helped intensify Swedish efforts to get the U.S. and the P.L.O. talking."

In Sweden, Arafat and the PLO delegation met with Swedish Minister for Foreign Affairs Sten Andersson at the Haga Palace in Stockholm. Five Jewish Americans would join the meeting: lawyer and peace activist Rita Hauser, human rights activist and head of the Labor Zionist Alliance Menachem Z. Rosensaft, peace activist Stanley Sheinbaum, Abraham Udovitch of Princeton University, and peace activist Drora Kass. Following the meeting, Arafat gave a speech in which he claimed to clarify the PLO's position on the Palestinian Declaration of Independence, stating that "We accept two states, the Palestine state and the Jewish state of Israel."

United States Secretary of State George Shultz responded to the Stockholm speech by saying that it was welcomed, but still fell short of the United States conditions for opening diplomacy with the PLO and would require further clarification.

The meeting was widely criticised by Jewish American groups. Anti-Defamation League national director Abraham Foxman stated that the five "does not represent the mainstream of Jewish opinion in the United States," while the Zionist Organization of America accused the five of being "actors in Yasir Arafat’s public relations melodrama." Conference of Presidents of Major American Jewish Organizations chair Morris B. Abram accused the five of being "willing dupes." Rabbinical Council of America vice-president Binyamin Walfish described the meeting as "totally irresponsible." Union of American Hebrew Congregations president Alexander M. Schindler stated that it "appears to be a step in the right direction," but warned that "ultimately, if Yasir Arafat wants peace, he will have to make that peace not with the Prime Minister of Sweden, nor with the United States Government, nor with American Jews - however well-intentioned - but with Israel itself." Rosensaft would submit a formal apology to the Labor Zionist Alliance later in December for not consulting with the rest of the organisation's leadership before participating in the meeting.

Arafat's Stockholm speech was met with scepticism from the Israeli government. Israeli Prime Minister Yitzhak Shamir stated that the PLO "can declare anything when their intention and ambition and philosophy — the destruction of the state of Israel — remains unchanged," adding that "I don't see any, I don't think I will ever see any meaningful change because they formed to destroy the state of Israel. The day they will agree this is not possible and not desirable they will have to break up." Israeli Minister of Foreign Affairs Shimon Peres stated that Arafat's speech "does nothing to upgrade the ambiguity and double-talk the PLO has used in Algiers." The Stockholm was also met with criticism from some factions of the PLO, with the DFLP calling it "a capitulatory reading which deformed the agreements reached at the P.N.C.," and PFLP leader George Habash saying that it "did not reflect the reality of the decisions adopted by the P.N.C. in Algiers."

Before leaving Sweden, Arafat would meet with Prime Minister Ingvar Carlsson, who cut short a visit to France, would stop by the grave of former Prime Minister Olof Palme to lay a wreath, and would join a formal lunch at Riksdagen.

=== United Nations General Assembly speech ===
As the American government had denied Arafat a visa to the United Nations headquarters in New York, the United Nations General Assembly chose to hold a special session in Geneva, Switzerland.

Arafat's UNGA speech was met with scepticism from the Israeli government. Prime Minister Yitzhak Shamir described it as "an act of monumental deception," and pledged that his government "shall not recognize the PLO under any conditions." Minister of Foreign Affairs Shimon Peres described it as "a rhetorical success and a political disappointment," while stating Israel would be willing to negotiate with Palestinians, but "It is not enough to declare that shooting will be stopped. There must be an immediate end to phenomena such as the stone and gasoline bomb attacks." Permanent Representative of Israel to the United Nations Yohanan Bein stated that Israel was "ready to conduct negotiations" based on UNSC resolutions 242 and 338, but would not negotiate with the PLO as "the PLO has not abandoned terrorism. The killing of women and children in Tel Aviv and Jerusalem is clearly condoned," saying that "violent disturbances must cease, tranquility and normal daily life must be restored in the territories."

At the end of the special session in Geneva, the UNGA adopted United Nations General Assembly Resolution 43/177.

=== Aftermath and opening of United States-PLO diplomacy ===
In the days following Arafat's speech to the UNGA, the American government announced that it believed that the PLO had met its conditions for opening diplomacy. United States Ambassador to Tunisia Robert Pelletreau would be charged with leading direct talks between the PLO and the US for the first time. At the end of December 1988, the American government temporarily froze negotiations with the PLO as the Reagan administration prepared for the transition to the George H. W. Bush administration in January 1989.

Following Arafat's speech to the UNGA, the European Parliament voted 60-52 in favour of a resolution calling for European governments to recognise the PLO as a Palestinian government in exile. Later in December 1988, the European Economic Community announced that it would embark on a diplomatic initiative to encourage direct negotiations between the PLO and Israel.

In late December, a rally would be organised by Peace Now calling for the Israeli government to begin negotiating with the PLO as well. A late December Dahaf Institute poll found that 54% of Israelis supported opening negotiations with the PLO.

== Assessments ==
=== Debates over Arafat's diplomacy ===
In 2003, Israeli author Barry Rubin argued that "rather than see the dialogue as a chance to prove his readiness for serious negotiation and compromise, Arafat portrayed it as a triumph which had showed that the Intifada was forcing the United States to accept the PLO on its own terms."

In 2014, commenting on the 2013–2014 Israeli–Palestinian peace talks, Alan Baker of the Jerusalem Center for Security and Foreign Affairs argued that "Arafat’s 1988 statement does not come close to meeting the requirement for the Palestinians to recognize Israel as the nation-state of the Jewish People," arguing that he "only summarized the language of UN General Assembly Resolution 181."

=== Role of the Swedish government ===
The role of the Swedish government in facilitating the diplomatic events has been remarked upon. According to Fatah politician Ahmed Qurei, Swedish efforts to bring about international Palestinian diplomacy began with a 1974 meeting between then Prime Minister Olof Palme and Arafat, with the country playing a significant role in the PLO gaining observer status in the UN and then in the late 1988 events. Scholar Barry Rubin has noted on Arafat's UNGA speech that "he initially tried to keep his statement on the borderline, short of the minimum needed to qualify for a dialogue. Swedish officials had to revise his text, writing changes in the margins." According to Timo Behr and Teija Tiilikainen, "Andersson had long been engaged in the Middle East issue and is reported to have used his good personal relations with Arafat to lean on him to recognise Israel on behalf of the PLO as a precondition for the peace negotiations to begin."

Swedish State Secretary for Foreign Affairs Pierre Schori described the events as "a triumph for diplomacy and reconciliation," while highlighting the role the Swedish government had played, declaring that "it is a great accomplishment for our foreign minister, Sten Andersson, and for Swedish diplomacy."

Following the 1991 Swedish general election, in which the Social Democrats lost its ability to form a majority in Riksdagen and a centre-right government was formed under Moderate Party Carl Bildt, the Social Democratic government in neighbouring Norway would take on an increased role in the Israeli-Palestinian peace process, overseeing the 1993 Oslo Accords. The Swedish government would still play a significant role in the Oslo Accords negotiations, however.

== See also ==
- List of international trips made by Yasser Arafat
- 1988 Shultz Initiative
- 10 agorot controversy
