= Elaine Sciolino =

American writer

- Born: Buffalo, New York
- Occupations: Journalist, author
- Notable credit(s): The New York Times; The Outlaw State, Persian Mirrors, La Seduction, The Only Street in Paris, The Seine (books)
- Spouse: Andrew R. Plump
- Children: 2
- Website: elainesciolino.com

Elaine Sciolino is an American journalist and author. She is a contributing writer and former Paris bureau chief for The New York Times based in Paris. She has written six books.

== Early life ==
A native of Buffalo, New York, Elaine Sciolino grew up in its Italian-American neighborhood on the city’s West Side. Her father, Anthony Sciolino, was the founder and owner of Latina Importing Company, an Italian specialty food store in Niagara Falls. Her mother, Jeannette Limeri Sciolino, was a homemaker and part-time painter.

Sciolino attended Holy Angels Elementary School, Holy Angels Academy, and Canisius College, a Jesuit-run liberal arts college, graduating summa cum laude. She studied French history in graduate school at New York University on a National Defense Education Act IV doctoral fellowship. She received a master's degree and finished her doctoral courses and exams, but never wrote her doctoral dissertation on Louis-Sébastien Mercier, the eighteenth-century writer considered to be the first street reporter of Paris.

== Career ==
Working at Newsweek in Paris, Sciolino was the first American and the first woman to interview Ayatollah Ruhollah Khomeini when he came to France in exile in 1978. She accompanied him on his plane to Tehran in 1979, and covered the Iranian revolution, the U.S. hostage crisis in Iran and the Iran–Iraq War from both sides of the border. In Rome, she covered the Vatican and traveled with Pope John Paul II.

== Books ==
Sciolino has written six books.

Her first book, The Outlaw State: Saddam Hussein’s Quest for Power and the Gulf Crisis (1991) was based on her reporting in Iraq and followed the Iraqi invasion of Kuwait. She wrote it in six months with two daughters under the age of two, which she later said was a crazy thing to do. It was a Book-of-the-Month Club selection.

Her next book, Persian Mirrors: The Elusive Face of Iran (2000, second edition in 2005), was based on twenty years of covering Iran for Newsweek and The New York Times.

After she lived in Paris for several years, Sciolino wrote La Seduction: How the French Play the Game of Life (2011). It examined all aspects of France – from culture to foreign policy, from the bedroom to the boardroom – through the prism of seduction. T Magazine called it one of the best books of 2011. "From dinner parties to interviews, Sciolino aims her sharp pen at the behavior of the Parisian establishment," wrote Le Nouvel Observateur. Sciolino "investigates the very depths of French culture," wrote Le Monde.

The book that followed, The Only Street in Paris: Life on the Rue des Martyrs (2015), about the life of a street in her neighborhood, was a New York Times best seller. Kate Betts of the New York Times wrote that "she has Paris at her feet"; the Chicago Tribune called her "a storyteller at heart."

Sciolino's book The Seine: The River That Made Paris, published in 2019, was a national bestseller. In the New York Times, Edmund White called Sciolino "a graceful, companionable writer, someone who speaks about France in the most enjoyably American way." David A. Bell, Professor of History at Princeton University, said, "Sciolino writes with the authority of a historian, the sleuthing skills of a journalist, and the voice of a storyteller eager to recount the tales of those who have been touched by the Seine."

Adventures in the Louvre: How to Fall in Love with the World’s Greatest Museum, was published by W. W. Norton & Co. in April 2025. "Blending journalism, travelogue, history, and memoir, she demystifies the Louvre, the largest and most famous museum in the world. She approaches the Louvre as neither an art historian nor a tour guide but as a lifelong reporter. She introduces us to the people who are the lifeblood of the museum including curators, artisans, and gardeners. Sciolino shares her encounters with firefighters who take her into the basements and up onto the roof, the night watchman who believes in ghosts, the director of paintings who identifies five portraits more beautiful than the Mona Lisa, the curator who discovered a missing feather of the Winged Victory of Samothrace, the window washer who makes rainbows on the IM Pei pyramid, the photographer who finds queerness in ancient Greek and Roman sculptures." In a starred advance review, Kirkus Reviews wrote: “Deftly weaving history and memoir… Sciolino offers a spirited journey through France’s most storied museum, the Louvre… An intimate visit with a generous, genial guide.”

== Personal life ==
In 1986, Sciolino married Andrew Plump, an attorney specializing in international arbitration in the Paris office of the Linklaters law firm. They have two daughters, Alessandra Plump, a special education teacher in Washington, D.C., and Gabriela Plump, managing director for the Initiative for Policy Dialogue at Columbia University.

== Bibliography ==
- The Outlaw State: Saddam Hussein’s Quest for Power and the Gulf Crisis. New York: John Wiley & Sons, 1991. (hardcover) ASIN: B000AO4E3U (trade paperback) ISBN 0-471-54299-7 ISBN 978-0471542995. A Book-of-the-Month Club selection.
- Persian Mirrors: The Elusive Face of Iran. New York: The Free Press, 2000. (Reissued edition, 2005) ISBN 0-7432-8479-8 ISBN 978-0743284790
- La Séduction: How the French Play the Game of Life. New York: Times Books, 2011. ISBN 978-0-8050-9115-1, ISBN 0-8050-9115-7
- The Only Street in Paris: Life on the Rue des Martyrs. New York: W.W. Norton & Company, 2015. ISBN 978-0393242379, ISBN 0393242374
- The Seine : the River that made Paris W.W. Norton & Company, 2019. ISBN 9780393609356
- Adventures in the Louvre: How to Fall in Love With the World's Greatest Museum W.W. Norton & Company, 2025. ISBN 9781324021407
