= List of international trips made by Yasser Arafat =

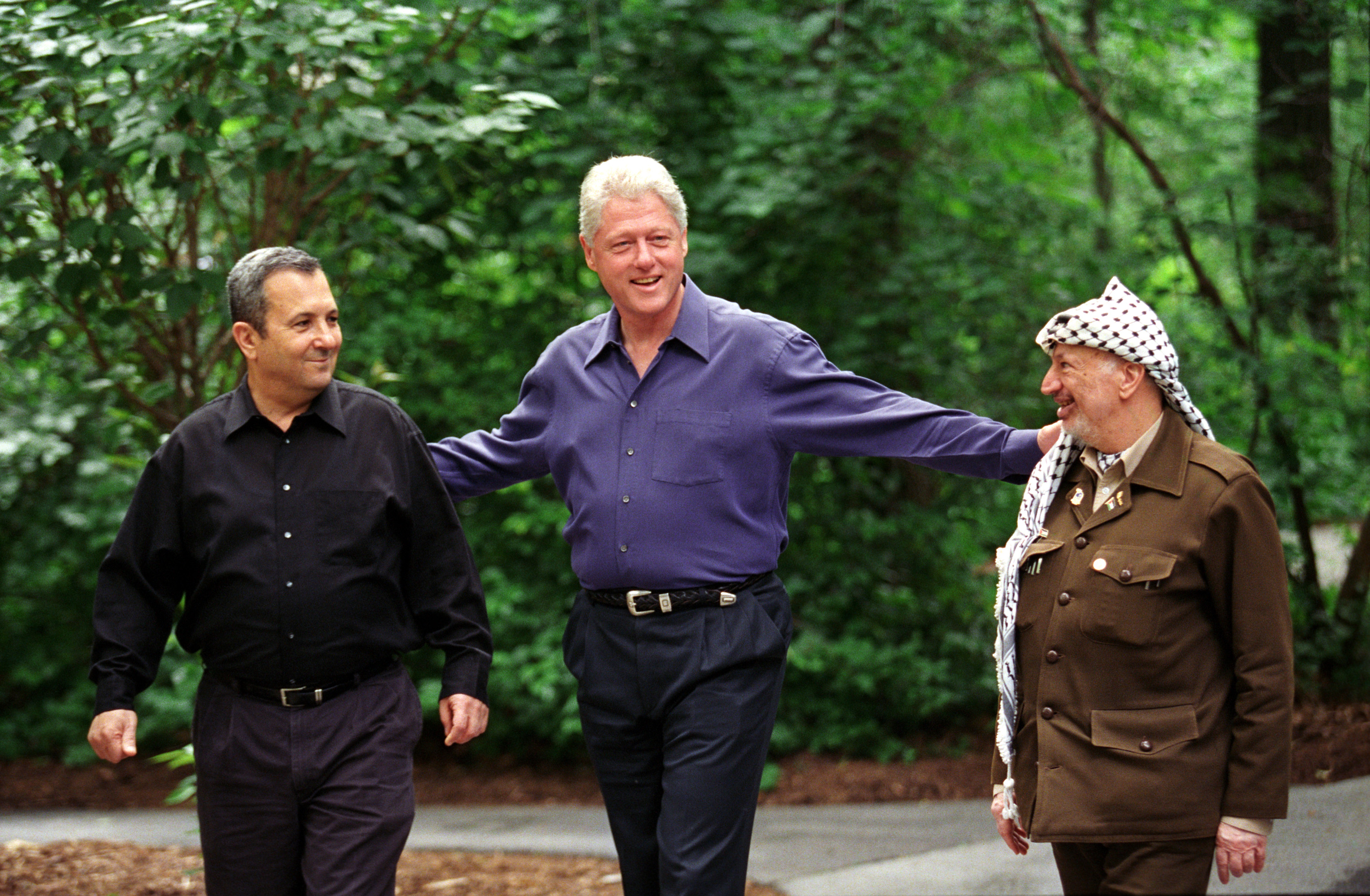
Arafat with President Bill Clinton and Prime Minister Ehud Barak in Camp David, 2000

This is a list of international trips made by Palestinian leader Yasser Arafat. Arafat was permanently based in Kuwait until the end of 1964.

== Summary ==
The number of visits per country where Yasser Arafat traveled are:

- One visit to Austria, Bahrain, Belgium, Bulgaria, Canada, Denmark, Iran, Ireland, Italy, the Netherlands, North Yemen, Poland, South Africa, Sudan, Switzerland, Tunisia, Turkey, Ukraine, the United Arab Emirates and the United Arab Republic
- Two visits to Czechoslovakia, East Germany, France, Hungary, Kazakhstan, Oman, Pakistan, Sweden and Yugoslavia
- Three visits to Germany, Greece, India, Iraq, Morocco, Spain, Syria and the United Kingdom
- Four visits to Libya, North Korea, Romania, Indonesia
- Five visits to Algeria, China, Egypt, and Vietnam
- Six visits to Japan and Saudi Arabia
- Seven visits to the Soviet Union/Russia and the United States

== 1960s ==
| Date | Location | Purpose | Ref. |
|---|---|---|---|
| 1962 | Algeria | | |
| July 1968 | Soviet Union | | |

== 1970s ==
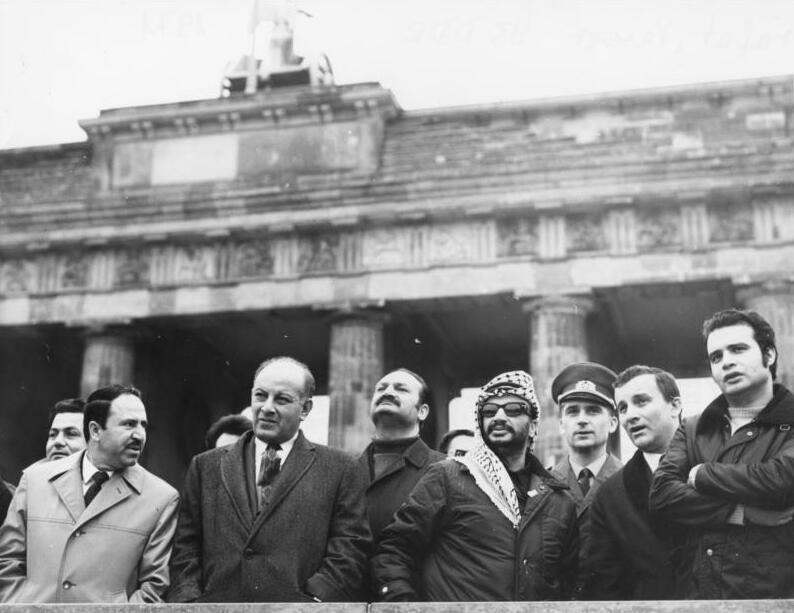
Arafat visiting the Brandenburg Gate, 1971

| Date | Location | Purpose | Ref. |
|---|---|---|---|
| 1 October 1970 | United Arab Republic | Attended the funeral of Gamal Abdel Nasser | |
| 1971 | East Germany | | |
| 19 January 1973 | Algeria Algiers | | |
| 11 November 1974 | United States New York | | |
| 1 November 1976 | Morocco Rabat | | |
| Spring 1978 | Romania Bucharest | Met with President Nicolae Ceaușescu | |
| 17 February 1979 | Iran Tehran | | |
| 28 March 1979 | Iraq Baghdad | He attended an Arab League meeting to discuss the peace treaty between Cairo and Tel Aviv | |
| 8 July 1979 | Austria Vienna | Met with Chancellor Bruno Kreisky and German chancellor Willy Brandt | |
| September 1979 | Spain | | |

== 1980s ==
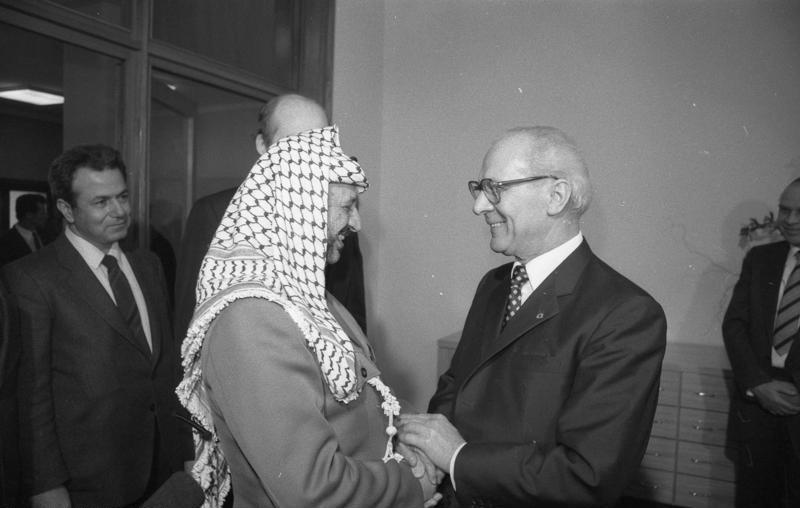
Arafat with East German leader Erich Honecker, 1982

| Date | Location | Purpose | Ref. |
|---|---|---|---|
| 28–29 March 1980 | India | | |
| 8 May 1980 | Yugoslavia | Attended the funeral of Josip Broz Tito | |
| 10 July 1981 | Yugoslavia | | |
| 7–10 October 1981 | China | | |
| 11–12 October 1981 | North Korea | | |
| 13 October 1981 | Japan | | |
| 16 October 1981 | Vietnam | | |
| 9 December 1981 | United Arab Emirates Abu Dhabi | Held talks with Austrian chancellor Bruno Kreisky | |
| 15–18 December 1981 | Greece | | |
| December 1981 | Romania | | |
| 2 February 1982 | Hungary | | |
| 9 March 1982 | East Germany | | |
| May 1982 | India | | 3-Day Visit |
| 24 May 1982 | Pakistan | | |
| 2 September 1982 | Greece | | |
| 16 September 1982 | Italy | Met President Sandro Pertini | |
| 15 October 1982 | Morocco | | |
| 27 October 1982 | Algeria | | |
| 15 November 1982 | Soviet Union | Leonid Brezhnev funeral | |
| 28 December 1982 | Spain Mallorca | Met Chancellor Bruno Kreisky | |
| 19 February 1983 | Algeria | | |
| 14 April 1983 | Sweden | Met Prime Minister Olof Palme | |
| 1983 | Bulgaria | | |
| 1983 | Czechoslovakia | | |
| 1983 | Hungary | | |
| 21 April 1983 | Romania Bucharest | Met President Nicolae Ceaușescu | |
| 26 June 1983 | Czechoslovakia Prague | | |
| 1 September 1983 | Switzerland Geneva | Addressed the U.N. conference on Palestine | |
| 23 December 1983 | Egypt | Held talks with President Hosni Mubarak in the wake of the Battle of Tripoli | |
| December 1983 | North Yemen | | |
| 31 December 1983 | Tunisia | Convene the Palestinian National Council | |
| 6 May 1984 | China | Held talks with high-ranking officials | |
| 7 May 1984 | North Korea | | |
| 25 July 1984 | Indonesia | Met with President Soeharto | |
| 29 July 1984 | Iraq | | |
| February 1985 | Romania Bucharest | Met with President Nicolae Ceaușescu | |
| 14 July 1986 | Sudan | | |
| 20 January 1988 | Greece | Met Prime Minister Andreas Papandreou | |
| 26 April 1988 | Syria | Met President Hafez al-Assad | |
| 1 September 1988 | Libya | Attend celebrations marking the 19th anniversary of the coup | |
| 13 September 1988 | France Strasbourg | Addressed the European Parliament | |
| 17 September 1988 | Libya | | |
| 6 December 1988 | Sweden | | |
| 10 April 1989 | Poland | Held talks with senior officials | |
| 3–4 May 1989 | France Paris | Met President François Mitterrand | |
| 25–26 June 1989 | North Korea | | |
| 28 June 1989 | Vietnam | | |
| 1–4 October 1989 | Japan | | |
| 4–5 October 1989 | China | | |

== 1990s ==
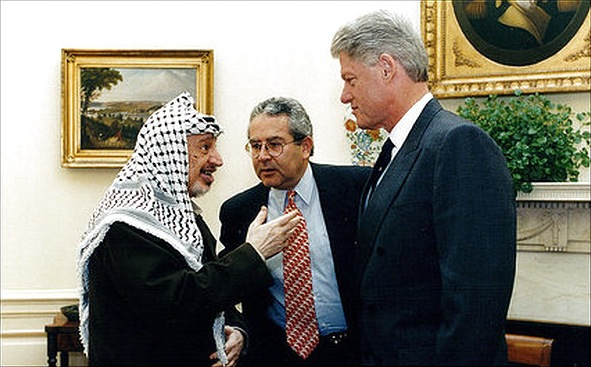
Arafat with President Bill Clinton in the White House, 1998

| Date | Location | Purpose | Ref. |
|---|---|---|---|
| 28–30 May 1990 | Iraq Baghdad | Emergency Arab Summit Conference | |
| 4 August 1990 | Iraq Baghdad | | |
| 5 August 1990 | Egypt Cairo | Emergency Arab Summit Conference in response to Iraq's invasion of Kuwait | |
| 10 August 1990 | Egypt Cairo | Emergency Arab Summit Conference in response to Iraq's invasion of Kuwait | |
| December 1991 | Kazakhstan | | |
| 8 April 1992 | Libya | | |
| 1-6 September 1992 | Indonesia | Attending the 1992 Non-Aligned Summit | |
| June 1993 | North Korea | | |
| 7 December 1993 | Germany Bonn | Met Chancellor Helmut Kohl | |
| 13 September 1993 | United States Washington D.C. | Oslo Accord signing ceremony | |
| 24 September 1993 | Indonesia | Discussing the Oslo Accords with the President of Indonesia | |
| 16 December 1993 | United Kingdom London | Met Prime Minister John Major | |
| 22 January 1994 | Syria | Offered condolences on the death of Bassel al-Assad | |
| 9 February 1994 | Egypt Cairo | | |
| 2 May 1994 | Germany | | |
| 23 February 1995 | Saudi Arabia Mecca | Met King Fahd | |
| 28 May 1995 | Morocco Rabat | Met Foreign Minister Shimon Peres | |
| November 1995 | Germany Hamburg | | |
| 25–27 December 1995 | Oman Muscat | | |
| 14 January 1996 | Saudi Arabia | | |
| 2–3 May 1996 | United States Washington D.C. | Met President Bill Clinton | |
| 23 May 1996 | Oman Muscat | | |
| 3–4 June 1996 | United Kingdom | Met Prime Minister John Major | |
| 19 June 1996 | Vietnam | | |
| 10–13 September 1996 | Japan | | |
| 1–2 October 1996 | United States Washington D.C. | Attended emergency White House summit with Israeli prime minister Benjamin Netanyahu | |
| 30–31 October 1996 | Spain | | |
| 20–22 November 1997 | India | | |
| December 1997 | Iran Tehran | Islamic Summit | |
| 1998 | Netherlands Amsterdam | | |
| 12 August 1998 | South Africa Cape Town | Met with senior officials and delivered a speech in Parliament | |
| 15–23 October 1998 | United States Wye River | Negotiating the Wye River Memorandum | |
| 25 October 1998 | Algeria | Met President Liamine Zéroual | |
| 5–6 April 1999 | Russia Moscow | Met President Boris Yeltsin | |
| April 1999 | Ukraine Kyiv | | |
| April 1999 | Kazakhstan | | |
| April 1999 | Japan | | |
| 3 May 1999 | Denmark | | |
| 9 September 1999 | Libya | | |
| October 1999 | Japan | | |
| 15 October 1999 | Vietnam | | |
| November 1999 | Russia Moscow | | |

== 2000s ==
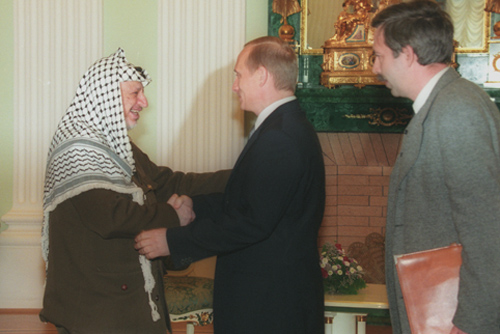
President Vladimir Putin with Yasser Arafat, 2000

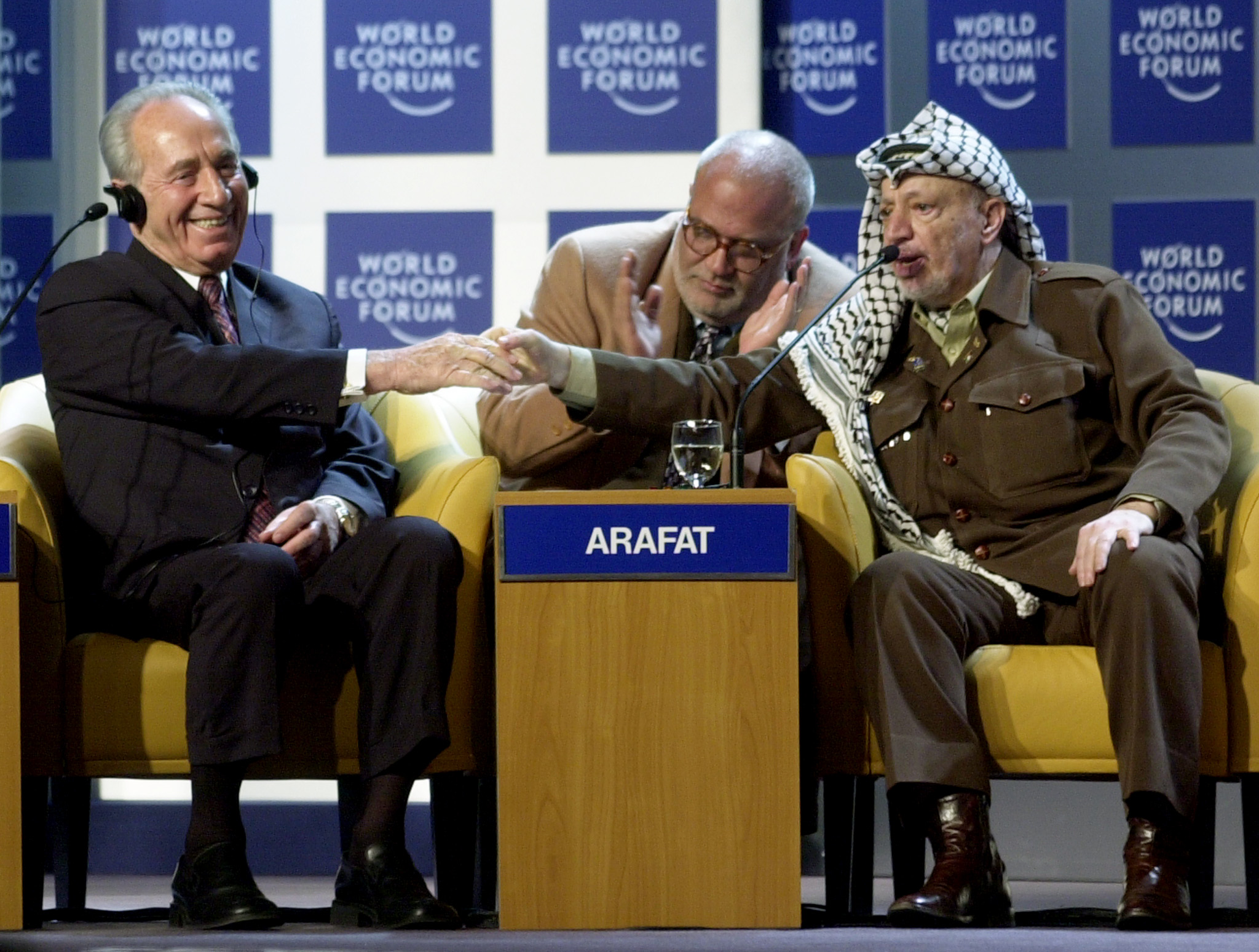
Arafat with Minister of Regional Cooperation Shimon Peres at the World Economic Forum annual meeting, 2001

| Date | Location | Purpose | Ref. |
|---|---|---|---|
| 13 June 2000 | Syria | Attended the funeral of Hafez al-Assad | |
| 11–24 July 2000 | United States | Camp David Summit | |
| August 2000 | China | | |
| 5 August 2000 | Turkey | Working visit | |
| 11 August 2000 | Russia Moscow | Met President Vladimir Putin | |
| 16 August 2000 | Indonesia | Meeting with President Abdurrahman Wahid | |
| 17–18 August 2000 | Japan | Held talks on the outcome of Camp David | |
| 10 November 2000 | Canada Ottawa | Met Prime Minister Jean Chrétien | |
| 24 November 2000 | Russia Moscow | Met President Vladimir Putin | |
| 2 January 2001 | United States Washington D.C. | Met President Bill Clinton | |
| 20 March 2001 | Saudi Arabia Jeddah | Met King Fahd and Crown Prince Abdullah | |
| 29 May 2001 | Russia Moscow | Met President Vladimir Putin | |
| 22 July 2001 | Saudi Arabia | Met King Fahd | |
| July 2001 | Saudi Arabia Jeddah | Offered condolences on the death of Prince Fahd bin Salman Al Saud | |
| 23 August 2001 | Pakistan | | |
| 24 ِ August 2001 | China | Working visit | |
| 25 August 2001 | Vietnam | Working visit | |
| 2 September 2001 | Saudi Arabia Jeddah | Met King Fahd and Crown Prince Abdullah | |
| 9 October 2001 | Bahrain Manama | Met Emir Hamad bin Isa Al Khalifa | |
| 14 October 2001 | United Kingdom London | Met Prime Minister Tony Blair | |
| 15 October 2001 | Ireland | Met with the Taoiseach Bertie Ahern | |
| 5 November 2001 | Belgium Brussels | Met Israeli foreign minister Shimon Peres | |
| 25 November 2001 | Egypt | Met Hosni Mubarak | |
