= Palestine–Soviet Union relations =

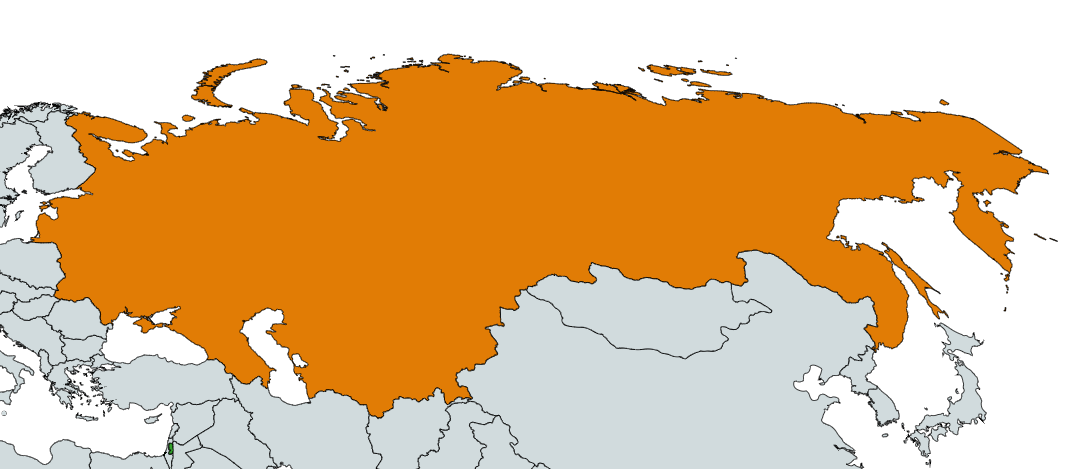

- Palestine: Soviet Union

Diplomatic mission
- PLO Embassy to the Soviet Union: Soviet Embassy to Palestine

Bilateral relations between Palestine and the Soviet Union were formally established in 1974, and were terminated in 1991 with the dissolution of the Soviet Union.

== History ==
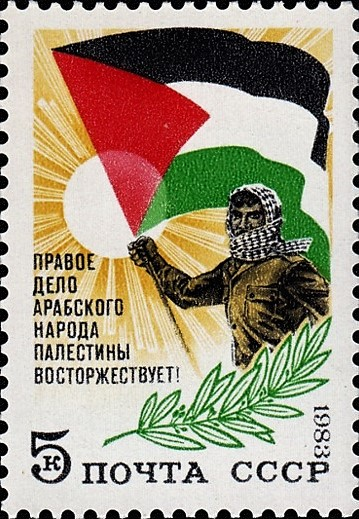
Soviet postage stamp from 1983 reading "THE RIGHTEOUS CAUSE OF THE ARAB PEOPLE OF PALESTINE WILL TRIUMPH!"

=== British Mandate period ===
The Communist Party of Palestine was founded in 1919, and was admitted to the Third Communist International (Comitern) soon after. It was strongly advised to "support the national freedom of the Arab population against the British-Zionist occupation." The party, however, was split between Arab and Jewish factions, and had little to no political influence. The Soviet Union provided no assistance to the party.

Following the Second World War, the Soviet Union continued its support of national liberation movements, including those in the Middle East. Both the Soviet Union and communist parties in the Middle East were against a partition of Palestine, instead advocating for a unified Arab-Jewish state.

This attitude was temporarily reversed in 1947 as a result of the Second World War's traumatic impact on the integrity and autonomy of the international Jewish population, particularly in the USSR and Europe. Zionism grew in popularity alongside the rapid increase of Jewish political and representative influence in Europe. Aware of the political consequences of opposing such sentiments, the Soviet Union opted to support the creation of a Jewish state and voted in favor of the United Nations Partition Plan for Palestine. This decision was received poorly by international socialist circles and Arab populations in the region. Seeking to balance environmental political sentiments with the USSR's own ideological direction, the USSR also called for the creation of an Arab-Palestinian state and, in a "strange alliance" with the Vatican, the internationalization of Jerusalem. Joseph Stalin, leader of the Soviet Union at the time, personally expressed his support for establishing an independent Jewish state in the region only if its motive was to create a unified, anti-imperialist state that opposed colonialism, particularly from the west.

=== Arab–Israeli wars (1948–1967) ===
After the First Arab-Israeli War in 1948, the Soviet Union began to see Palestinians primarily as refugees. On May 15, 1958, a joint Soviet-UAR press release said that:

The two governments examined the question of the rights of Palestinian Arabs and of their expulsion from their homes. They also examined the question of the violation of human rights, and the threats to peace and security in that area which this entails.

The Soviets continued to mention Palestinian rights to their lost land and property after 1949, but lacking any mention of Palestinian self-determination. As Israel shifted further towards the West, Soviet support shifted to Arab states and nationalist movements, including Palestinian groups. Israel hoped to make arrangements to be with both the US and NATO. Several moves by the Soviet Union and Eastern Bloc resulted in a series of murders and arrests, making Israel's position increasingly pro-western and anti-communist.

A joint Soviet-Algerian press release on May 6, 1964, called for attention to the "lawful and inalienable rights of Palestinian Arabs." The same phrase was repeated by Nikita Khrushchev on his visit to Egypt a few weeks later.

The Soviet reaction to the Palestinian liberation movement was initially cautious, especially with the Palestine Liberation Organization (PLO) and other Fatah organizations. The Soviets condemned their use of terrorism, saying that their moves created the "perception that the Arab partisans are only fanatical terrorists."

The Soviet Union had, according to a Palestinian journalist, secret contacts with several Palestinian leaders as early as May 1964, and had active cooperation with a number of Palestinian social organizations by 1965. These organizations would receive Soviet aid, especially in the form of scholarships for study in the Soviet Union.

Soviet relations began to improve with Palestine following the 1967 Arab-Israeli war, with the increasing political importance of Palestinian resistance. In July 1969, the Soviets decided to recognize Palestinians as a nationality, rather than just Arab inhabitants of Palestine. This included the consequent right to Palestinian self-determination, although it seemed "difficult for them to define."

=== Bilateral relations (1974–1991) ===
Official bilateral relations first began with the PLO, when, with permission of the United States, they opened an embassy in Moscow in 1974. The PLO was recognized as the sole legitimate representative of Palestine that same year. The Soviets emphasized the issue of Palestine as central in an Israeli-Arab settlement, most likely to discredit the progress of the US.

The Soviets sought for a two-state solution including both Palestine and Israel, rather than the PLO's idea of a democratic state in all of Palestine. The Soviets believed that the two-state solution was the only realistic solution, considering the American's commitment to the survival of Israel.

The 1982 Israeli invasion of Lebanon triggered a lack of unity among the PLO. The Marxist organizations in the PLO did not always support the Soviet's opinions, most notably the DFLP and the PLFP. Those groups rejected the idea of negotiations with the Soviet Union in the conflict. The Soviets were more inclined to support Yasser Arafat's Fatah due to its strength and relations to Moscow.

The support for Palestine began to wane in 1985 with Mikhail Gorbachev's "new thinking" of Soviet foreign policy. The first and most obvious steps in this direction occurred during Arafat's visit to Moscow in April 1988. Despite pressure from radical Palestinian leaders like George Habash, the Soviets were reluctant to recognize a Palestinian state in a November 1988 Palestinian National Council (PNC) session. This won the praise of both the US State Department and the Israeli government, saying that the Soviets helped "to prevent this new entity from joining the UN or the World Health Organization in 1989."

In September 1990, a PLO executive member, Abdullah Hourani, expressed concerns that the Soviet Union was attempting to "please the Zionist government and obtain American money." This was followed with him saying that the Soviets were no longer a friend in liberation, including other Arab world countries. Palestinians still enjoyed the support of some Soviet media and public opinion, but Soviet relations for Palestine had been overshadowed in favor of relations with Israel.

The Soviets terminated their relations with Palestine as a result of the dissolution of the Union. The Soviet embassy to Palestine became the Russian embassy to Palestine, as Soviet relations were succeeded by the Russian Federation.

== See also ==
- Foreign relations of the State of Palestine
- Foreign relations of the Soviet Union
- Palestine–Russia relations
- Israel–Soviet Union relations
