= 1988 Arab League summit =

Meeting of Arab regional organization

Arab League Summit
- Host country: Algeria
- Date: June 1988
- Cities: Algiers
- Chair: Chadli Benjedid

The 1988 Arab League summit held in June in Algiers, Algeria was the fifteenth Arab League Summit (the twelfth summit in 1981 was divided into two sessions, with the second session being held in 1982). The conference which has been held since 1964 had as focus, the topic of the First Intifada, an uprising by the Palestinians against Israeli occupation and the consequent upswing in Israeli-Palestinian violence.

The Arab states resolved to support the intifada financially. Other things decided in the conference were their concerns over Iran-Iraq war and displeasure with the United States over its bias in policy over the Arab-Israeli conflict.
