= March 1982 Palestinian general strike =

General strike by Palestinians in 1982

- Part of Israeli–Palestinian conflict
- Date: 11 March 1982 – 30 March 1982
- Location: Occupied Palestinian Territories, Israel
- Methods: Strike action, general strike, protest, stone throwing

Parties
Palestinian citizens National Guidance Committee; Palestinian Liberation Organisation; Democratic Front for the Liberation of Palestine	Government of Israel; Israeli Civil Administration; Israel Defense Forces; Israeli settlers

Lead figures
Ibrahim Tawil; Bassam Shakaa; Karim Khalaf	Menachem Begin; Ariel Sharon; Menahem Milson

Casualties and losses
5 dead	1 dead

The March 1982 Palestinian general strike was a general strike and wave of protests in Palestine and Israel in March 1982, in opposition to the forced dismissals of Palestinian city councils and mayors.

On 11 March 1982, the Israeli government banned the National Guidance Committee, a Palestinian leadership body in the occupied territories led by mayors elected in 1976. On 18 March, the Israeli government ordered the city council of Al-Bireh, a city in the West Bank, forcibly disbanded and its mayor dismissed, claiming that the council supported the Palestine Liberation Organization and had refused to cooperate with the Israeli Civil Administration. Two more Palestinian mayors, Bassam Shakaa of Nablus and Karim Khalaf of Ramallah were forcibly dismissed a week later. In response, a general strike and widespread protests broke out across the Palestinian Territories, with some protests being held in Israel in solidarity, and additional protest being held to mark Land Day. The Israeli government attempted to forcibly suppress the general strike, including through use of tear gas, rubber bullets, and live ammunition, as well as increased censorship of the press, imposition of curfews, and forcing shopkeepers to open their shops. The strike was also marked by an increase in Israeli settler violence. At least five Palestinians were killed over the course of the general strike, as well as one Israeli soldier.

The strike was a key moment in a wave of Palestinian unrest between late 1981 and mid 1982, at that point the largest outbreak of Palestinian unrest since Israel captured the Palestinian territories during the Six-Day War in 1967, with some Palestinians referring to it as a "Spring Uprising" or as the "Intifada of 1982." Palestinian nationalists in the occupied territories, who supported the PLO but largely acted independently of the PLO's central leadership (then based in Lebanon), contended that the Israeli government aimed to suppress Palestinian nationalism and undermine local democracy as part of a move towards annexation of the Palestinian Territories. The Israeli government, led by Likud Prime Minister Menachem Begin and Minister of Defence Ariel Sharon, argued that the Palestinian mayors were political extremists who played key organising roles within the PLO, including terrorism, and that peace between Palestine and Israel would not be possible as long as the PLO continued to dominate Palestinian politics. The Israeli disbandments and response to the strike were widely condemned internationally, and resulted in the Israeli government nearly losing a vote of no-confidence in the Knesset.

By the end of 1982, following the 1982 Israeli invasion of Lebanon, almost all of the elected Palestinian city councils had been disbanded, the National Guidance Committee had been definitively dismantled, and the PLO had been expelled out of Lebanon. In the longer term, however, the Israeli government's actions failed to effectively suppess the Palestinian nationalist movement, leading to continued tensions throughout the 1980s that culminated in the outbreak of the First Intifada in 1987.

== Background ==
By 1982, the PLO was based in Lebanon, and had become a major participant in the Lebanese Civil War.

In 1976, the Israeli government, then led by the Israeli Labor Party, allowed local elections to be held throughout the West Bank, under the assumption that conservative, pro-Jordanian candidates would win. Instead, the 1976 West Bank local elections saw major victories by candidates linked to the Palestine Liberation Organization (PLO), bringing a cohort of younger, more nationalist, and more outspoken figures to the forefront of Palestinian politics. These mayors and councillors would subsequently become the leading figures in the National Guidance Committee, formed in 1978 as a coalition of nationalist leadership figures (including labour unionists, student council leaders, and other local groups) to coordinate their activities in the occupied territories. The election results shocked the Israeli government, who subsequently expelled the mayors of Hebron and Halhul, and tried to expel the Mayor of Nablus, in 1979 and announced that it would indefinitely block further local elections from being held in Palestine, claiming that further elections would "cause damage to the peace process." Tensions surrounding Palestinian mayors were amplified when Israeli settlers attempted to murder several of the mayors in June 1980.

Also adding to the tensions were suspicions among Palestinians that the Israeli government wished to undermine the independence of Palestinian city councils and local Palestinian institutions, and extend its control over the Palestinian population and land. One key factor in these suspicions was Israeli support for the creation and arming of the Palestinian Village Leagues, associations based on primarily rural traditional societal structures that Israel saw as more amenable to Israeli interests. Most Palestinians, however, considered the Village Leagues to be inauthentic and collaborators. In November 1981, the head of the Village League in Ramallah, Yusuf Khatib, and his son, were assassinated by Palestinian militants in an attack claimed by the PLO. On 12 March 1982, shots were fired by Palestinian militants at the home of a Village League leader in Beitunia.

Also contributing to tensions was the significant increase in Israeli settlers in Palestine following the election of the Menachem Begin-led government in the late 1970s, who took a more active role in encouraging settlement. As well, following the Egypt–Israel peace treaty in the late-1970s, Israel gradually withdrew its occupation of the Sinai Peninsula, including dismantling its settlements in the Sinai, a withdrawal that was due to be complete by late April 1982 under the Camp David Accords and that was opposed by many settlers in the West Bank and Gaza. In early March 1982, some settlers blockaded roads in the West Bank in protest over the withdrawal. Israeli Minister of Defence Ariel Sharon, however, pledged that West Bank settlements would not be dismantled, saying that "we would never agree to their removal. Half a million Israelis would stream into the region to stop it."

In November and December 1981, a significant wave of protests broke out across Palestine following the Israeli government's announcement that it would re-organise the body overseeing the occupation of the Palestinian Territories from the Israeli Military Governorate into the Israeli Civil Administration, a nominally civilian-led department of the Israeli Ministry of Defence. The Civil Administration was to be led by Israeli academic Menahem Milson, one of the main proponents of the Village Leagues and an advocate for active intervention by the Israeli government in Palestinian politics to cultivate anti-nationalist Palestinian leadership. The re-organisation was viewed as a cosmetic change at best, and at worst as a prelude to annexation.

Late February and early March 1982 also saw a small outbreak of protests following the Civil Administration's decision to forcibly close Birzeit University for two months after a group of students attacked an Israeli official visiting the campus to try and enforce Israeli Military Order No. 854, which gave the Civil Administration greater control over Palestinian universities. Early 1982 also saw rumours of war between Israel and Lebanon, as well as a significant general strike by the Golan Heights Druze protesting against Israeli annexation of the Golan Heights.

The first two months of 1982, however, also brought some hopes of peace, with the United States attempting to restart the Palestinian autonomy talks, the PLO accepting the Saudi-proposed Fahd Plan for peace, and two moderate Palestinian mayors, Elias Freij of Bethlehem and Rashad al-Shawwa of Gaza City, making statements calling for the PLO to officially recognise the State of Israel.

== Events ==
=== Banning of the National Guidance Committee ===
On 11 March 1982, the Civil Administration banned the Palestinian National Guidance Committee.

=== Forced disbanding of the Al-Bireh city council ===
On 18 March 1982, the Israeli Civil Administration ordered the elected city council of Al-Bireh, a Palestinian city in the central West Bank, to be immediately disbanded and Al-Bireh mayor Ibrahim Tawil immediately removed from his post. In their place, the Israeli Civil Administration announced that it would install a committee of Israelis led by a former Israeli military officer. The order, signed by Civil Administration head Menahem Milson, justified itself by accusing the city council and mayor of refusing to cooperate with the Civil Administration. Minister of Defence Ariel Sharon claimed the city council had "preferred an extraneous political consideration to the well-being of their city and its inhabitants," accusing the council of having "cut off all contact with the civil administration whose main function is to make possible normal life." The order marked the first time in the Israeli occupation that Israel moved to completely dismantle an elected Palestinian city council.

The order was met with widespread shock in Al-Bireh. After being escorted by soldiers out of the Al-Bireh city hall, Tawil met the press and accused Israel of attempting to impose the Civil Administration on Palestine and described the order as "a revenge action against the council of El Bireh because they refused on principle to meet with Milson," saying that he would not recognise the order as valid. Protests gathered outside the city hall and soon spread through the city, with several protestors being arrested after throwing stones at an Israeli military bus.

=== General strike ===
As news of the order spread through Palestine, protests began to break out across the country, including general strikes in Al-Bireh, Bethlehem, and Ramallah. Mayor of Nablus Bassam Shakaa announced that the Nablus municipality would go on a three-day strike and would not cooperate with the Civil Administration.

On 19 March, the general strikes spread to the entirety of the West Bank. The Israeli military moved to suppress the protests, confiscating the editions of three Palestinian newspapers published in East Jerusalem before they could be distributed, claiming that the newspapers had not presented their articles to the Israeli Military Censor for approval before publishing.

On Saturday 20 March, Israeli soldiers surrounded the Nablus city hall to prevent a demonstration called for by Shakaa and ordered a curfew over the Cave of the Patriarchs after a clash between protestors and settlers from Kiryat Arba. In Al-Bireh that day, Israeli soldiers used tear gas to forcibly disperse a woman's protest outside the city hall and later opened fire with live ammunition on a protest in the city's main square after the protestors threw stones, injuring two protestors and killing one, a 17-year-old named Ibrahim Ali Darwish. The body of another 17-year-old Palestinian, Mohammed Abdullah Youssef Suhweil, was also discovered in the Israeli settlement of Shilo, with one settler being arrested for murder, and several local Palestinians claiming that the settlers had been kidnapping and beating Palestinian youth.

On 21 March, the Israeli military ordered Damiyah Bridge and Allenby Bridge, the main crossing points between the West Bank and Jordan, closed. Israeli forces also imposed blockades on the cities of Nablus, Ramallah, and Al-Bireh, not allowing anyone in or out of the cities during daylight hours, and imposed a curfew on the refugees camps Askar Camp and Balata Camp. That day, five Palestinians were injured after being shot by Israeli soldiers, and two Israeli soldiers were injured by thrown stones.

On 22 March, a second Palestinian youth protestor was shot and killed by Israeli forces in the Deir 'Ammar Camp and three others wounded, with the Israeli military saying that they had been throwing stones at Israeli soldiers. Israeli forces also attempted to prevent shopkeepers in several Palestinian cities from joining the strike by visiting the shopkeepers' homes in the early morning and forcibly escorting them to open their shops. The general strike, originally intended to last for three days, was extended.

By 23 March, the protests had spread to the Gaza Strip, with a general strike being declared in Rafah. Three Palestinians were killed on 24 March, bringing the death toll to five, and at least nine injured. One was killed by an Israeli settler in Bani Na'im, one killed in Jenin after trying to stab an Israeli police officer, and one being shot by Israeli forces trying to disperse a demonstration in Khan Yunis. The stabbed Israeli police officer was seriously injured. Several hundred Palestinians were arrested by Israeli forces that day.

=== Knesset no-confidence motions ===
The disbandments and the Israeli government's response to the general strike as well as its response to the simultaneously ongoing 1982 Golan Heights Druze general strike almost caused a political crisis in Israel. The centre-left Labor Alignment, far-left Hadash, and centrist Shinui parties all proposed no confidence motions in the government led by Prime Minister Menachem Begin and the right-wing Likud party. During the heated five-hour debate in the Knesset, Labor leader Shimon Peres accused Begin of trying to create a "Palestinian ghetto" and accused Minister of Defence Ariel Sharon of "incitement and demagogy." Sharon stated that it was "not possible to implement any plan, our autonomy plan or any other plan as long as the PLO rules on the West Bank," saying that "this is the struggle for Eretz Israel" and accusing the Labor Party of the "responsibility for the rise to power of the PLO." The vote of no-confidence resulted in a draw, with 58 MKs voting in favour and 58 voting against. As the votes in favour did not win a majority, the motion failed.

Motion of no-confidence
Ballot →	23 March 1982
Result →	Motion failed ✗
Votes in favour	58 / 120
Against	58 / 120
Abstentions	4 / 120

Begin had initially declared that he would resign if the no-confidence vote resulted in a draw, and convened an emergency meeting of the cabinet following the vote. During the cabinet meeting, Minister of Welfare and Social Affairs and Tami leader Aharon Abuhatzira spoke against Begin's resignation, and the minor coalition parties Agudat Yisrael and the National Religious Party both stated that they might be willing to seek a coalition with Labor to prevent early elections. Begin ultimately chose to remain as Prime Minister after the Israeli cabinet voted 12 to 6 for him to continue. He afterwards told the press that he expected an early general election "within a year."

=== Further mayoral expulsions and protests ===
On 25 March, the Israeli Civil Administration ordered Mayor of Nablus Bassam Shakaa and Mayor of Ramallah Karim Khalaf immediately expelled from their positions and replaced with Israeli officials, accusing them of being "extreme and uncompromising" and of "general agitation, nonrecognition of the Israeli civil administration, and repeated attempts to disrupt public order." Shakaa and Khalaf were notified of the order early in the morning, when Israeli soldiers visited their homes to wake them up and told them to sign a document recognising the dismissal, which Shakaa and Khalaf refused to do. When Khalaf and Shakaa spoke to the press afterwards, having been blocked from entering their offices by Israeli soldiers, Khalaf called the forced dismissal an "arbitrary action," claiming it was "another step toward annexing the West Bank and Gaza Strip," while Shakaa accused the soldiers of having called him "half a human," mocking him over the loss of his legs in the June 1980 West Bank bombings.

The additional expulsions inflamed the general strike. That day saw an Israeli soldier being killed and three wounded in the Gaza Strip when grenades were thrown at their vehicle, the first Israeli death since the beginning of the general strike. Responsibility for the grenade attack was claimed by the Democratic Front for the Liberation of Palestine, who stated it had been carried out "in response to the actions being carried out by the Israeli aggressors inside occupied Palestine." Follow the grenade attack, the Israel Defence Forces deployed elite paratrooper units to patrol the Palestinian Territories.

One Palestinian was injured on 26 March in Halhul, after Israeli soldiers fired warning shots to disperse a demonstration. Israeli soldiers also moved to confiscate several Palestinian newspapers and forced residents of Bethlehem in the middle of the night to dismantle barricades that had been built by protestors. That day, Civil Administration head Milson called a press conference to defend the Israeli government's actions, where he stated that Israel could not allow the PLO to have control over Palestinian politics, additionally claiming that the 1976 West Bank local elections had been undemocratic and that the PLO controlled at least 10 city councils across the West Bank.

On 27 March, one Israeli soldier was injured in Nablus as protestors and Israeli forces clashed, with several dozen protestors being arrested. In East Jerusalem that day, 50 shopkeepers were arrested after refusing Israeli orders to open their shops. Palestinians also claimed that the Israeli military had carried out a mass arrest of all men in the Ein Beit al-Ma' refugee camp that night.

The next day, one Palestinian was injured in Hebron when a settler whose car had been hit by stones fired at a demonstration blocking the road. Palestinians claimed that 35 Palestinian Christians were arrested in Beit Sahour that day and forced to spit on a Palestinian flag, when a protest after church services clashed with Israeli forces, claims that the Israeli military denied. As well, three members of the Nablus city council were arrested that day. The Israeli cabinet also released a statement that day after holding a special meeting to discuss the ongoing protests, stating that it would "continue undaunted" its Palestinian policy, saying that it would "ensure peace and give all possible help to Arab residents of Judaea, Samaria and Gaza who keep the low and maintain the peace. No acts of violence or breaches of the peace, of any kind whatsoever, will be tolerated."

On 29 March, four Palestinians were injured in Ya'bad while clashing with Israeli soldiers when a group of Civil Administration staff attempted to visit the village.

=== Land Day ===
As the protests continued, they coincided with Land Day, the annual day of protests held by Palestinians to mark the anniversary of a significant wave of protests that broke out in 1976 over a move by the Israeli government to confiscate Palestinian land. In preparation for Land Day, the Israeli military ordered its soldiers to be on higher alert. A demonstration that day was also by Al Fajr journalists in protest against Israeli censorship, resulting in 15 of the journalists being arrested after they refused to voluntarily disperse.

Land Day protests also saw widespread participation by Arab citizens of Israel, despite most councils of Arab towns inside Israel choosing not to join a general strike over fears that their participation would worsen tensions. One demonstration in Jaljulia developed into a serious clash with Israeli police, resulting in at least five protestors and six police officers being injured. In Nazareth, the mayor's wife and office director were arrested.

Following the Land Day protests, the wave of protests largely subsided. According to Milt Freudenheim of The New York Times, the atmosphere in the West Bank "largely reverted from open defiance to sullen resentment. Israeli paratroopers and border police patrolled major towns and prevented young Palestinians from staging mass demonstrations. However, terrorists booby-trapped the car of a Palestinian official who has cooperated with Israeli authorities."

== Reactions ==
=== In Palestine ===
Mayor of Nablus Bassam Shakaa, who had been forcibly dismissed on 25 March, claimed that "no one respects" the Israeli occupation administration, saying that "they want the land and they don't want the people." Azmi Shu'aibi, a councillor in the dismissed Al-Bireh city council, claimed in an interview with the Middle East Research and Information Project that "the Likud government considered that the military government had failed in the campaign to quicken the annexation of the occupied territories, because the military bureaucracy was not efficient or equipped to pursue certain technical matters such as land confiscation, settlements, forced emigration and all that this entails," while criticising the Palestinian nationalist movement for its response to the events, saying that "there were no united efforts. Instead, there were many individual efforts to deal with the crisis situation. Second, when the confrontation took place, the national movement did not work on a comprehensive mobilization against the Civil Administration. The resistance was handled in a top-heavy manner. The logical conclusion to total refusal of the Civil Administration was civil disobedience, but the national movement was not able to escalate its resistance to this level, as happened in the Golan."

Deputy Mayor of Ramallah Reverend Audeh Rantisi stated that "This control by force and fear cannot continue. The people will not cooperate with any Israeli committees that try to run the government." Mayor of Hebron Mustafa Natshe claimed that "the occupation authorities choose the worst in every respect," adding that "the settlers come - they are the worst of Israel, so they push the Arabs to be more extremist. The type of settlers in the area are the worst, so nobody in the city can speak with them. They give a bad face to the Jews. Who didn't know the other Jews in Israel, they would think these are the Jews." Mayor of Bethlehem Elias Freij stated that "What took place during the past three weeks was not on orders from the P.L.O. People see things and are fed up," although he subsequently largely declined to join other Palestinian city councils in an extended strike.

An anonymous Palestinian interviewed by the Australian Associated Press claimed that "whenever a leader or spokesman emerges the Israeli authority clamps down," adding that Palestinian commercial strikes "really only hurts us because the Jewish settlers here do not shop in our town, but it is one of our few means of protest — we are not armed." Ellen Cantarow of The Village Voice wrote that the Palestinians she talked to in the months after the protests "besiege me with stories from last spring - deaths, curfews, woundings, mass midnight round-ups of all the men in entire village," saying that they " were as angry as they were bereaved," and quoting a Palestinian peasant from Sa'ir as exclaiming "They are doing these things to make us leave the country. But we shall die here! We shall never leave our country, our village. Never!" An interfaith delegation organised by the American Friends Service Committee that toured the West Bank and interviewed Palestinians following the events reported that "we asked if they thought the violence associated with the stoning of Israeli jeeps, soldiers and others, the setting of roadblocks, etc., was justified, in their minds. While no one openly advocated such measures, it seemed clear that most felt that this was an inevitable expression of the frustration of Palestinians living under the occupation. As one elder gentleman put it graphically, taking a water glass in his hand and saying, 'If you fill water to the top of the glass and then keep pouring, the water is bound to overflow.' The Palestinians with whom we met and many of the Israelis as well believe that the incidents of the last month will be repeated in perhaps an even more intensified form in the weeks ahead... One of the ironies and perhaps most serious consequences of this shift to the Civil Administration and the resulting ousting of the mayors was articulated to us by a well-known Palestinian intellectual. He noted that the ostensible purpose of the Civil Administration in coordination with the Village Leagues was to·develop a more moderate Palestinian leadership. Ironically, it has been the elected Mayors of the West Bank who have been among the most moderating influences on the PLO, The removal of these mayors, all of whom can be considered among the more moderate of Palestinian spokesmen, has the opposite effect of that which is stated by the Civil Administration. Namely, rather than developing a more moderate Palestinian leadership, the most moderate voices are being removed from the scene, thereby encouraging the more radical voices among the Palestinians."

=== In Israel ===
Minister of Defence Ariel Sharon described the events as a "power struggle with the Palestine Liberation Organization," a sentiment echoed by Israeli Civil Administration head Menahem Milson, who called it "perhaps the most significant battle since 1948." In an interview with British newspaper The Guardian, Milson further claimed that "pro-PLO municipalities have to use all sorts of repression and intimidation" to convince the Palestinian population to boycott the Civil Administration, saying that he was prepared to forcibly disband more Palestinian councils "if necessary" and that "the situation is like a car going downhill without brakes: we ought to stop it in order to save the car and all the people in it, Jews and Arabs. We're going to do it by putting it into first gear. There's going to be a lot of screeching, a lot of noise, and some of the gears may get broken, but we'll save the car." Prime Minister Menachem Begin echoed Sharon's claim that the Labor Party had "invited" the PLO into power and denounced protests within Israel against the government's Palestinian policies, asking "What are we coming to? To what terrible denial of the bases of Judaism and Zionism and the faith for which our sons fought and died?"

Central Command commander General Ori Orr defended the miltiary's measures against the unrest, stating that "blocking towns with road blocks was a collective punishment, but riots were also a collective act and people who threw stones now realized that this caused them discomfort." Zvi Elpeleg of Tel Aviv University, a former military governor of the occupied territories, urged the Israeli government to take further actions, stated that, "since 1967, Israeli leaders believed that the more you gave the Arabs, the less political they got. We were going to be the enlightened conqueror. But instead, we created a political vacuum on the West Bank that was filled by the PLO. It wasn't a plan, it was just a stupid mistake."

Israeli Labor Party General Secretary Haim Bar-Lev accused the Israeli government of governing the Palestinian Territories "based on force," saying that "as long as the government is interested in annexing the West Bank, it can expect such deterioration." Labor MK Abba Eban stated that "I can't think of anything more grotesque, to use a weak word, than a government which professes to aspire to full autonomy for the Palestinians on a national scale canceling the limited municipal autonomy that already exists and then denouncing those who brought that limited autonomy into existence." Eban also called for the Israeli government to publish the list of books that it had banned in the West Bank, which he claimed included George Orwell's Nineteen Eighty-Four and Alan Moorehead's books on the search for the source of the Nile, and called for the establishment of a parliamentary committee to oversee the government's Palestinian policy.

Binyamin Ben-Eliezer, the former military governor of the West Bank, warned that Palestinians saw the Israeli government's moves as "a step toward annexation" and stated that he did not believe the PLO had incited the protests. A Peace Now demonstration in Tel Aviv against the disbandments saw attendance of 15 000, with some clashes with the police after the police seized a Palestinian flag that had been unfurled by some of the demonstrators. The Jerusalem Post published an editorial warning of a "spiral of repression," saying that "to talk about the need to resume negotiations on Palestine autonomy, while young boys in the West Bank are wounded, and in one case killed by Israeli soldiers, as if there were no other ways to control stone-throwing crowds, is sheer self-delusion."

On 28 March, the Israel Broadcasting Authority (IBA) broadcast an interview with Shakaa and Khalaf after the IBA's staff threatened to go on strike if the interview was not shown. In response, the Israeli cabinet condemned the IBA, with Cabinet Secretary Arye Naor accusing the IBA of "incitement against the State." IBA director Tommy Lapid defended the initial decision to block the broadcasting of the interview: "The BBC did not invite Goebbels to make Nazi propaganda to the British people; this is the same situation. Shakaa and other PLO leaders in the West Bank make use of our TV for PLO propaganda to Arabs, including Israel's Arab population, to incite them to disobedience. I don't think this is the task of the IBA." The IBA would subsequently institute a formal policy against broadcasting interviews with Palestinian nationalists.

=== Internationally ===
American White House Press Secretary Larry Speakes stated that "we deplore the loss of life over there, and we are hopeful that all parties will show restraint." Spokesperson for the United States Department of State Dean E. Fischer stated that the United States was "increasingly concerned" over the "heightened level of tension, demonstrations and especially the use of lethal force against demonstrators." A second statement by Fischer stated that the United States "always regarded the Israeli decision to permit municipal elections as a progressive and helpful policy. Consistent with this position we regret — as we have made clear previously — the removal of elected municipal officials on the West Bank."

Arab governments largely condemned the disbandments, although took few concrete actions. Egyptian Minister of Foreign Affairs Kamal Hassan Ali stated that the Israeli response was "an obstacle in the way of possible Palestinian participation in the autonomy elections." Government of Kuwait spokesperson Abdel Aziz Hussein stated that the disbandments "constitutes an escalation of the suppression" and called for "practical steps to halt the atrocities of Israel." The Turkish Ministry of Foreign Affairs released a statement calling for Israel to reverse the disbandments "immediately." King Hussein of Jordan claimed that the United States was losing its influence over Israel, saying that Israel was "now much more bellicose than in the past. The attitudes of extremism seem to have hardened: they do not seem to have any more compassion or understanding." King Hussein also claimed that there was a risk of growing Islamic fundamentalism paralleling the Israel hardening, particularly if nationalist movements failed to secure Palestinian self-determination, saying that "America must realise that her interests in this region are in jeopardy. Do they want to see this entire area erupt with devastating effects on world peace? Is the current instability that is leading us in this direction really in Western interests?"

The ten heads of government of the European Economic Community issued a joint statement expressing "deep concern" and "particularly denounced the repression imposed on the Palestinian population." French Secretary for the Presidency Pierre Bérégovoy released a statement warning against "unilateral measures imposed an any state or people" and called for all parties involved "to respect democratic freedoms so as to halt the chain of violence and repression." The British Foreign Office released a statement saying that "we deplore the dismissal by the Israeli military authorities of the democratically elected mayors" and called for "an end to the violence which can only harm the prospects for a settlement." Some controversy was sparked when Israeli authorities blocked British Foreign Secretary Peter Carington, 6th Baron Carrington from arranging a meeting between one of his aides and the dismissed mayors in early April, saying that the mayors no longer held any official positions and were under house arrest.

Australian Minister for Foreign Affairs Tony Street stated that "recent events have not helped what we regard as the solution to the Palestinian problem." In Canada, a dinner for federal MPs organised by the Canada-Israel Committee saw debates between MPs over the disbandment of the Palestinian city councils, with former Minister of Foreign Affairs Flora MacDonald calling it "a step which has discouraged friends of Israel, true friends of Israel, because we see this not only as a step away from the Camp David road, but a step that threatens all the gains so far made."

The National Association of Arab-Americans accused Israel of "a total disregard of the most basic human rights of the Palestinians," saying that "we greatly fear that the terrible Israeli repression is gong to completely drive the Christian presence from the Holy Land." French newspaper Le Monde published a front-page editorial warning that Israel's response to the general strike might harm the peace process with Egypt. Australian newspaper The Canberra Times published an editorial asking "whether the current Israeli severity is actually meant to make negotiations impossible." The Australian Jewish News, on the other hand, wrote that "constant pressures and aggravation against Israel are forgotten," additionally claiming that the PLO was reacting to a loss of influence due to the rise of the Village Leagues and that it and the Arab governments that supported it wished "to sabotage Israel's endeavours" towards peace.

=== United Nations ===
In late-March, the United Nations Security Council convened to debate the situation in Palestine, with a group of Arab diplomats presenting a draft motion condemning Israel and calling for it to rescind the city council disbandments and for sanctions to be placed if it did not. Permanent Representative of Jordan to the United Nations Hazem Nuseibeh accused Israel of "wonton, inhuman and indiscriminate use of fire arms." In response, Permanent Representative of Israel to the United Nations Yehuda Zvi Blum accused the Palestinian Liberation Organisation and Jordan of "conspiring to destroy" the "framework for the peaceful coexistence between Jew and Arab" that Israel was creating. Voting on the motion was delayed as Security Council diplomats attempted to redraft the motion towards a consensus.

United States Ambassador to the United Nations Jeane Kirkpatrick, then serving as Presidenct of the Security Council, refused to meet Palestinian Ambassador to the United Nations Zuhdi Labib Terzi during the debates, although he was able to address the Security Council.

On 2 April, the vote on the motion was held. The final draft contained six provisions, including denouncing the Israeli response to the protests and to the ongoing general strike in the Golan Heights, calling for Israel to rescind the disbandment, and to apply the Geneva Conventions to the Palestinian Territories. Thirteen of the fifteen countries represented on the Security Council voted in favour, with Zaire abstaining, and the United States voting against, using its veto power.

S/14917
Ballot →	2 April 1982
Result →	Motion failed ✗
Votes in favour: • People's Republic of China; • French Republic; • Co-operative Republic of Guyana; • Republic of Ireland; • State of Japan; • Hashemite Kingdom of Jordan; • Republic of Panama; • Polish People's Republic; • Kingdom of Spain; • Togolese Republic; • Republic of Uganda; • Union of Soviet Socialist Republics; • United Kingdom of Great Britain and Northern Ireland	13 / 15
Against (Note: The five permanent members of the United Nations Security Council possessing veto power were China, France, the Soviet Union, the United Kingdom, and the United States.): • United States of America	1 / 15
Abstention: • Republic of Zaire	1 / 15

Later in April, the United Nations General Assembly approved resolution A/RES/ES-7/4, condemning Israel for the disbandments and for its policies towards Palestine. Eighty-six countries voted in favour, with twenty voting against, thirty-six abstaining, and fifteen not present for the vote.

In its October 1982 report, the United Nations Special Committee to Investigate Israeli Practices Affecting the Human Rights of the Palestinian People wrote that the "civilian population in these territories has been under military occupation for nearly 15 years, in the course of which respect for their human rights has eroded steadily," citing the disbandments. In the report, the Special Committee wrote that "citizens of towns of which mayors and municipal councils had been dismissed were subject to increased harassment in the form of raiding houses, arrests, being summoned to the Israeli authorities on a regular basis and requiring an exceeding number of licences to perform normal municipal duties... A new phenomenon was the increased activity of members of "village leagues" who harassed opponents of the league system and carried out duties against the wishes of the local inhabitants such as connecting the local electricity system to the Israeli grid." The Special Committee also noted that Joseph Algazy of the Israeli League for Human and Civil Rights personally witnessed Shakaa's dismissal, saying that "upon the request of Mr. Shaka'a to confirm the dismissal in writing, the soldier delivering the order told him that it was an oral order. Members of dissolved municipal councils have been subjected to harassment in the form of being repeatedly summoned to the office of the local Military Governor, where they are kept waiting for an entire day, after which they are instructed to report again on the following day. Another form of interference with municipal developments is the freezing of local projects by the military authorities. He stated that mayors, journalists, trade unionists and members of student unions were constantly subjected to infringements pertaining to their basic human rights, for example, freedom of expression and freedom of movement." The report also noted that "Jewish settlers joined in with Israeli troops to quell the violent disturbances."

== Analysis ==
=== Contemporary assessments ===
According to William Claiborne of the Washington Post: "coupled with the deportation in 1980 of two other pro-PLO mayors and the imposition of "town arrest" travel restrictions on several other outspokenly nationalistic Arab leaders, the recent actions have stripped the West Bank of most of the leaders elected six years ago in what Israel then hailed as the first truly free elections Palestinians had ever enjoyed." Claiborne further stated that it was surprising that "the Israeli campaign was begun at a time of relative calm in the West Bank - a calm that has been shattered." Arthur Hagopian of The Canberra Times warned that the relative calm that returned following the end of the strike was "deceptive, for beyond every shop window larks the shadow of an Israeli police man, truncheon in hand, helmet thrown back," and that Palestinian "seething discontent" had "by no means run its course." Hagopian also warned that "neither side seems so far to have heard of the word 'compromise.'" Geoffrey Godsell of The Christian Science Monitor argued that "Israel's timing has been astute. It knows Egypt's hands are tied because the Egyptian government will do nothing likely to give the Israelis a pretext for not completing the withdrawal from Sinai. It knows that 1982 is a congressional-election year in the US, which can only add to the inhibitions against effective pressure by the Reagan administration. It knows, too, that European protest is in effect a bark without a bite."

John Drysdale of The Straits Times called the violence that erupted during the strike "ominious [sic?] in the extreme." According to Drysdale, Israeli government operated on the assumptions that the Palestinian mayors were being threatened by the PLO into a radical nationalist stance, that the Palestinian Village Leagues more accurately represented the majority views of Palestinians, that radicalised Palestinians feared a loss of influence if partial autonomy was granted to the Palestinian Territories under the Camp David Accords, and that peace in the Palestinian Territories would have to include both Palestinians and Israeli settlers. According to James MacManus of The Guardian, the Israeli government aimed to "undercut the radical, pro-PLO mayors who dominated West Bank politics and foster a moderate alternative" and that the Israeli Civil Administration under Milson had a programme of "exploiting the levers of patronage, the granting or witholding [sic?] of funds and favours, to paralyse the municipalities, and to nurture the network of village leagues." Trudy Rubin of The New York Times wrote that the disbandments "confirms the end of what Israelis once proudly called a 'liberal' occupation policy. It also undermines a long-standing United States hope that the mayors might serve as intermediaries between Israel and the Palestine Liberation Organization in future peace moves. Though small-town men, the West Bank mayors elected in 1976 were much more than mere administrators. They were the only democratically elected Palestinian officials anywhere. Those elections, more honest than the voting under Jordanian rule before 1967, were the showpiece of the policy devised by the late Moshe Dayan to allow West Bankers to live relatively normal lives and limit Israeli interference to security matters... Israeli officials hope that ousting the mayors will help cut West Bank links with the P.L.O. and reconcile the population to Israeli rule."

Christopher Hitchens wrote in The Spectator wrote that settler extremism could no longer be considered a fringe element within Israeli politics and that Israel would be facing increasing international scepticism of its treatment of Palestinians, also saying that "you can easily meet Palestinians who coexist or even cooperate with the occupation. You cannot find anybody who actually supports it. If there was a real moderate alternative, the last 15 years of trying would have discovered it." According to British researcher Helena Cobban, "the vast majority of West Bank Palestinians now consider that Israeli policy toward them consists of two prongs: Official administrative measures against land ownership and local institutions seek to curtail all prospects of finding an independent local livelihood; The daily actions of the settlers meanwhile aim at terrorizing West Bankers to leave their ancestral homes and villages." Joseph C. Harsch of The Christian Science Monitor wrote that "the basis for self-rule by the Arabs has been largely demolished since the appointment of Milson last November. The prospect of liberation for the Arabs has been taken from them. They feel that they have been abandoned by the outside world and betrayed by the Americans. The Camp David prospect of 'full autonomy' has been replaced by the prospect of their lands and their persons being forced into an extension of the state of Israel."

David K. Shipler of The New York Times stated that the Israeli government's response to the strike revealed "some new dynamics of Begin policy," which "carried implications for Israel's near future," namely that Begin was "deeply unsatisfied with his strength in the Knesset and wants more authority and leverage" and was "also not satisfied with his strength in the West Bank." Amos Perlmutter of the American University wrote in 1983 that "Sharon's growing popularity among the changing Israeli electorate proved crucial for the politically beleaguered Begin in the 1981 elections. In a close election, Sharon turned out to be a critical electoral asset and was rewarded - in spite of much hue and cry from the Labor Party - with the defense ministry. From the beginning, it was obvious that Sharon would be the blunt instrument of Begin's policies, the man who did the dirty work and, if necessary, the villain for any actions that backfired."

=== Historical assessments ===
In 1986, University of North Texas historian Emile Sahliyeh wrote that the pro-Jordanian elite that had dominated Palestinian politics in the 1960s lost most of their influence in the 1970s with the ascent of the PLO, whose members were younger, more educated, more urban, and more strongly nationalist. As a result, Sahliyeh wrote, Israeli policies became significantly more restrictive through the late-1970s and early 1980s, adopting an "iron fist" policy of suppressing Palestinian nationalism, while increasing censorship of Palestinian newspapers, regularly closing Palestinian universities that were hotbeds of nationalist sentiment, blocking approval and funding for Palestinian municipal projects, and eventually disbanding nationalist Palestinian councils. Ultimately, according to Sahliyeh, "although Israel's policy of creating a rural-based altemative [sic?] Palestinian leadership had failed, it nevertheless undermined the political power of the West Bank nationalist elite." Amal Jamal of Tel Aviv University wrote in 2005 that the outlawing of the National Guidance Committee and the disbandments "gave further evidence of Israel's intent to inhibit any Palestinian initiative aimed at consolidating a local leadership that swore allegiance to the PLO. Political activity on a national level was thus crippled, and a massive process of deinstitutionalisation ensued that influenced all aspects of Palestinian life. Any civil, cultural, or unionist activity on the regional level that might have national political implications was either put under severe control or emptied of content."

In 1995, Rex Brynen of McGill University wrote that, as a result of the loss of influence over city councils and its bases in Lebanon in 1982, the PLO turned towards grassroots organising as the 1980s continued, resulting in "the level of popular organisation grew dramatically in the form of student, trade union, and women's organizations. Such organisation (and the diffuse local leaderships they spawned) proved far more resistant to Israeli countermeasures than the earlier reliance on a relatively small number of public nationalist figures," and which would ultimately "provide much of the organisational underpining for the Intifada." Eitan Alimi of the Hebrew University of Jerusalem wrote in 2003 that the disbandments "practically demolished the most important factor that acted as a buffer between the population and the occupier... Israeli attempts to substitute the mayors for the Village Leagues and later on for other notable figures were to no avail. By then, the vacuum created was soon to be occupied by grassroots activists who lent support to the population, expanding their organizational network to meet their daily needs."

In 2009, Mark Tessler of the University of Michigan argued that, although Begin's government stated that its actions against the Palestinian mayors was "designed to correct an error of the previous Labor government in permitting these individuals to be elected in the first place," the actions were primarily motivated by "the growing resistance to occupation" in the territories. According to Neve Gordon of Queen Mary University of London, by 1982, "it had become apparent that in order to contain the oppositional social forces that had been awakened and were rapidly gaining ground, Israel had to change the way it managed the population," saying that the Israeli government shifted to placing an emphasis on sovereign power to suppress Palestinian nationalism, that it fostered the Village Leagues to replace Palestinian nationalist leadership, and that it banned Palestinian political organisations and disbanded the elected city councils "to prevent the development of institutions that could serve as a basis for an independent Palestinian state."

Don Peretz of Binghamton University wrote in 1990 that, by March 1982, "bloody clashes with the authorities were frequent, and civil unrest was greater than in any period since the occupation had begun," adding that "following dismissal of Arab mayors, the army imposed a new series of restrictions. The Civil Administration began to reject requests for licenses and permits required to operate municipal services. When municipal employees struck, they were ordered to report for work or be dismissed. Censorship was tightened on the Arabic press in East Jerusalem, and when the pro-PLO dailies al-Faj'r and al-Sha'b rejected the new regulations, they were banned in the territories. They continued to be sold in Jerusalem, which was under Israeli law and not subject to military authorities. New restrictions were also imposed on trade unions; their members were harassed by repeated military interrogations, and several union leaders were arrested," and that "for the first time since the occupation began, there was widespread public criticism within Israel of the tactics used by the military to deal with Palestinian resistance." Asher Kaufman of the University of Notre Dame wrote in 2024 that "by March 1982, the Occupied Territories had witnessed unprecedented violence and civil unrest not seen since 1967... Milson’s proposition for “how to make peace with the Palestinians” turned out, in practice, to be a catalyst for making war with them. As if to highlight the fact that crushing the PLO and constructing Jewish settlements went in tandem, on April 25, 1982 (the very day the Sinai withdrawal was completed), the government approved the establishment of settlements as a “private initiative,” precedentially enabling individual Jews to purchase privately owned land—revising the previous practice of only building on supposed “state land.”"

== Aftermath ==
The first half of 1982 would continue to be a violent period in the Israeli–Palestinian conflict and Arab–Israeli conflict. In mid-April, an Israeli reservist would kill two Palestinians in a shooting at the Dome of the Rock, sparking a further wave of unrest. According to Neve Gordon of Queen Mary University of London, "confrontations between Israel and the occupied Palestinians reached a high point in the spring of 1982. All protests were confronted with extensive force, and scores of schools were shut down for weeks on end, both in order to prevent social unrest and as a means of collective punishment. During 1982, the Israeli military killed an estimated 31 Palestinians and wounded 365 more, most of them at protests, in what was subsequently called the “spring uprising.” Although during the First Intifada there were periods in which more Palestinians were killed in a single day, such levels of violence had not been seen in the OT since the 1971 excursion into Gaza. Simultaneously, Israel was less prone to restrict punishment to those who carried out the transgressive acts, and began extending it to those around them, using collective punishment more pervasively. The military's response seemed, from Israel's point of view, to be effective because for a short while it managed to contain the population."

In early June 1982, Palestinian militant group the Abu Nidal Organization attempted to assassinate Israeli ambassador to the United Kingdom Shlomo Argov. Israel would subsequently invade Lebanon, aiming to end the Palestinian insurgency in South Lebanon and install a pro-Israel government in Lebanon, beginning the 1982 Lebanon War and sparking further unrest inside the occupied territories. Ze'ev Schiff of Haaretz wrote in 1982 that the invasion of Lebanon was in part motivated "by the belief that quiet on the West Bank cannot be achieved merely by dismissing Shakaa and Khalef (both permanently maimed two years ago in car-bombing assassination attempts and both ousted from office last spring by Begin's West Bank civilian Governor Menahem Milson), but rather by the destruction of the PLO in Lebanon." Lebanese-American scholar Fouad Ajami wrote in 1982 that the invasion took place in a context "where discernible risks appeared in store [to the Israeli government]: the imminent return of Egypt into inter-Arab politics, the growing influence of Saudi Arabia in the U.S. scheme of things, the possibility that the fight over the West Bank would lead to an open breach with the United States, and the assertiveness of the young on the West Bank," saying that "the Lebanese sideshow leads back to where the real fight of Palestinian nationalism has raged for some time: the West Bank and Gaza." Roger Friedland and Richard Hecht wrote in 2000 that the expulsion of the mayors and the invasion of Lebanon "were of a piece... Israel's war in Lebanon was really a war for the West Bank. It was a war Israel and the PLO both lost." Asher Kaufman of the University of Notre Dame wrote in 2024 that "while no direct causal connection should be drawn between Milson’s views and the government’s plans in Lebanon, it is hard not to infer that Milson’s plans and actions concerning the PLO and the West Bank, on the one hand, and the government’s military designs in Lebanon, on theother, were mutually complementary."

The Israeli government would continue to forcibly disband Palestinian city councils and their mayors over the course of 1982. On 30 April, the Israeli government ordered the dismissal of Anabta Mayor Wahid Hamdallah, citing alleged security violations. On 15 June, it ordered the disbanding of the Nablus and Dura city councils, accusing the councils of supporting the PLO. On 6 July, Mayor of Jenin Shawki Mahmoud, citing a refusal to meet with Civil Administration head Menahem Milson. On 9 July, Mayor of Gaza City Rashad al-Shawwa. Al-Shawwa, widely considered a moderate, and the Gaza City council had refused to work in the city hall since the general strike, working from home instead in a symbolic protest, and had refused to sign an order from the Israeli military forbidding them from making political statements. On 14 July, Mayor of Deir Dibwan Rashid Hijazi, the eighth Palestinian mayor to be forcibly dismissed in five months, with Israeli officials claiming that Hijazi had led a work slowdown since the general strike. In late July, Mayor of Qalqilya Amin Nasser and the city council, after the council refused to stop its strike against the disbandments.

The administrative functions of the disbanded city councils would be placed in the hands of military-appointed Israeli administrators for the next three-and-a-half years. The Village Leagues failed to gain traction and were ultimately defunct by mid 1984. It would take until December 1985 for the Civil Administration to appoint a Palestinian to a mayoral position, naming Nablus Chamber of Commerce chairman Zafer al-Masri as Mayor of Nablus. Masri, however, was assassinated by the hardline Popular Front for the Liberation of Palestine after only two months in office.

== See also ==
- Timeline of strikes in 1982
- List of strikes in Palestine
