= November 1979 Palestinian protests =

1979 Palestinian protests against Israel

The November 1979 Palestinian protests were a wave of protests across the occupied Palestinian territories following the Israeli government's decision to arrest and deport Mayor of Nablus Bassam Shakaa. The decision to arrest Shakaa had been taken after Israeli newspaper Haaretz published a report on a private conversation between Shakaa and Israeli Coordinator of Government Activities in the Territories Danny Matt during which it claimed that Shakaa had made comments supporting the 1978 Coastal road massacre. After significant unrest among Palestinians, including the resignation of the mayors of all Palestinians, and the publication of a full transcript of the conversation, in which it was revealed that Shakaa had neither supported nor condemned the massacre, but had instead stated that attacks were a consequence of discontent with the Israeli occupation, the Israeli government reversed its decision and released Shakaa from custody.

== Background ==
Nablus is one of the largest cities in the Palestinian West Bank. In the 1976 West Bank local elections, Bassam Shakaa was elected Mayor of Nablus. Shakaa, who was in his late forties in 1979, was a Palestinian nationalist, with links to the Palestinian Liberation Organisation, and was considered a radical in Palestinian politics. According to David K. Shipler of The New York Times, Shakaa was "among the most politically active [of Palestinian mayors], attending every possible meeting and raising his voice on every conceivable issue." By July 1979, the Israeli government had banned Shakaa from travelling abroad, and the Israeli Military Governorate began considering charging Shakaa with sedition for his role in organising Palestinian protests against the illegal settlement of Elon Moreh that had been establish near Nablus in June 1979.

== Events ==
=== Haaretz report ===
In early November 1979, Israeli newspaper Haaretz published a report detailing a private conversation between Mayor of Nablus Bassam Shakaa and Israeli Coordinator of Government Activities in the Territories Danny Matt. According to the report, Shakaa had justified and expressed his support for the 1978 Coastal road massacre, when a group of Fatah militants had hijacked a bus and murdered 36 Israeli civilians, during the conversation.

Israeli Minister of Defence Ezer Weizman learned of the report for the first time later that day during a session of the Knesset. According to William Claiborne of The Washington Post, the report "swept the Knesset floor just as Defense Minister Ezer Weizman, who had not read the account, entered the chamber. Weizman, facing a torrent of criticism from rightest members, impulsively announced that the government would 'take action' against Shaka."

Maariv, another Israeli newspaper, subsequently published a full transcript of the conversation. According to the transcript, Matt had repeatedly questioned Shakaa whether he supported terrorism. In response, Shakaa had neither explicitly supported nor explicitly condemned Palestinian political violence, instead stating that "Operations like these, if they occur, are only a reaction to other acts," that "the Israeli state injures the rights of the Palestinian people, and its policy is policy of force, and it is unlikely that this will not bring about reactions of this type," and that "there are also liable to be terrorist operations by isolated individuals due to the present situation. This is the reality in which we live."

=== Arrest and protests ===
Following publication of the Haaretz report, Shakaa's wife quickly lodged a case with the Supreme Court of Israel to block any potential deportation orders against Shakaa. On 8 November, the Supreme Court issued a temporary injunction blocking Shakaa's deportation. The injunction called for Israeli Minister of Defence Ezer Weizman to offer an official explanation for why Shakaa should be deported.

Three days later, the Israeli military governor of the West Bank summoned Shakaa to his office for a meeting at 8 in the morning. At the meeting, the governor informed Shakaa that he would deported. After informing Shakaa, the Israeli military arrested Shakaa, allowing him to make a phone call to his family before imprisoning him in Ramla Prison. The arrest immediately sparked protests among residents of Nablus, with a general strike breaking out through the city and the entirety of the city council of Nablus resigning en masse.

Protests against Shakaa's arrest soon spread throughout Palestine, including strikes, demonstrations, sit-ins, student strikes, and commercial strikes. Most of the protests were non-violent, with stone throwing at Israeli soldiers reported in a minority of protests. General strikes were also called in Ramallah and Hebron, with the Hebron Chamber of Commerce ending the general strike in its city on 19 November.

The arrest also quickly provoked widespread consternation among other Palestinian mayors. On 12 November, mayors in the Gaza Strip held an emergency meeting, issuing a joint statement saying that "we are asking the Israel government and particularly Defense Minister Weizman who is known as a reasonable man not to lend his hand to a general revolt in the entire occupied land," and proposing that Gaza City mayor Rashad al-Shawwa lead an emergency delegation to meet with Weizman. The next day, as Shawaa led the meeting, including the mayors of Khan Yunis, Bethlehem, and Hebron, Palestinian mayors and city councillors across the occupied territories began announcing their resignations in protest against Shakaa's arrest. After the meeting failed to secure Shakaa's release, all remaining Palestinian mayors and city councillors announced their resignations. The Israeli Military Governorate refused to accept the resignations.

Protests by Palestinians, including those against Shakaa's arrest, were considered illegal under the Israeli occupation regulations. As a result, the Israeli military significantly increased its deployment of soldiers in the West Bank and attempted to disperse some of the protests. When the resigning Palestinian announced their intention to hold a hunger strike in front of the offices of the International Committee of the Red Cross in Gaza City, the Israeli military established roadblocks to prevent Palestinians from travelling into the city. Some of the West Bank mayors who had intended to join the demonstration instead held a demonstration at the Red Cross office in Al-Bireh.

On 12 November, Shakaa announced that he would be launching a hunger strike in protest over his arrest. Shakaa ended his hunger strike at the end of November, due to dangerously low levels of blood sugar. An additional general strike was held in East Jerusalem in protest against the deportation on 27 November. Continuing protests through late November coincided with the 32nd anniversary of approval of the United Nations Partition Plan for Palestine, leading to a spike in protests, including one in Qalqilya which clashed with Israeli forces.

=== Continuing court case ===
Following his arrest, Shakaa, represented by Israeli lawyer Felicia Langer, lodged a further case with the Supreme Court of Israel. On 12 November, the Supreme Court ruled that his arrest did not violate the temporary injunction it had placed against a deportation order. On 14 November, the Security Cabinet of Israel announced that it would order Shakaa deported from the Palestinian territories.

On 22 November, the Supreme Court Supreme Court of Israel ruled that it did not immediately have the power to judge on the deportation order and that he must first be judged by a military tribunal, which represented a lower level of appeal in the Israeli judiciary system. In its judgment, the Supreme Court further ruled that the Fourth Geneva Convention did not take precedence over the Defence (Emergency) Regulations, regulations that had been introduced by the British Empire in Mandatory Palestine in 1945. The Supreme Court also ruled against releasing Shakaa from Ramla Prison.

On 25 November, the military tribunal was formed to hear Shakaa's case. If the military tribunal upheld the deportation order, he would have three days to appeal back to the Supreme Court. On 27 November, the military tribunal postponed the hearing on Shakaa's case.

=== Shakaa's release ===
On 5 December 1979, the Israeli military unexpectedly announced that it would release Shakaa and cancel the order to deport him, allowing him to resume his functions as Mayor of Nablus immediately. Israeli military governor of the West Bank Binyamin Ben-Eliezer stated that the decision to release Shakaa had been taken due to "the needs of the city of Nablus and Mr. Shaka's family," adding that he had "made it clear to Mr. Shaka to limit himself to his functions as mayor and to act within the framework of the law."

When Shakaa was released from prison, he was greeted by crowds of supporters in Nablus. He had lost 26 pounds as a result of his hunger strike. Upon his release, he stated that "The decision to arrest and deport me was a mistake by the Israeli authorities. They now understand I have done nothing wrong," adding that "It was the first time in the history of the military government that a private conversation was disclosed to the press within 15 minutes. This is a plan against all the mayors in the occupied territories who are against their plans of occupation." Following his release, all the Palestinian mayors who had resigned held a joint meeting in Beit Hanina, announcing that they would withdraw their resignations and releasing a statement calling for the establishment of an independent Palestinian state led by the PLO, an end to the Camp David Accords, and the withdrawal of all Israeli settlements from the occuied territories.

== Reactions ==
=== In Israel ===
Prime Minister Menachem Begin defended the deportation, saying that it was "based on local regulations, enforced in Judaea and Samaria since 1945," and accused Shakaa of "acting for the murderous PLO which is bent on the destruction of Israel and is using genocidal methods through repeated attacks against civilians, men, women and children." Minister of Internal Affairs Yosef Burg described Shakaa as "a master of incitement," and that "if someone has an active role with the PLO we cannot forego security." Ya'akov Nehoshtan, Deputy chief of mission to the Embassy of Israel, Washington, D.C., stated that Shakaa "has consistently been at the head of those elements attempting to create an atmosphere in which [terrorist] attacks will continue to be perpetrated," and that by "taking the lead in organizing strikes, demonstrations and disruptions of the public order, the Mayor has consistently exploited his position as an elected official to guide his followers in the direction of violence."

Israeli Minister of Defence Ezer Weizman unexpectedly announced on 15 November that he intended to abolish the position of Coordinator of Government Activities in the Territories. According to Gil Sedan of the Jewish Telegraphic Agency, "Weizman was clearly angered over the Shaka incident which, he believes, could have been avoided." Later in November, Weizman stated in a televised interview that "If I’d been asked a week ago whether [the arrest] was the outcome I wanted, I would have said no. But in this case I was obliged to put the political background aside and decide what was best for Israel’s security and what my response must be as defence minister," adding that he had previously "made it clear to [Shakaa] that we can’t put up with this sort of thing." Following Shakaa's release, Weizman expressed "delight" at the release, saying that the decision to arrest him had been taken by the Israeli military, not the Israeli government.

Some controversy was sparked after Israel Broadcasting Authority director Yosef Lapid blocked news presenter Haim Yavin from airing an interview with Shakaa during the affair. Felicia Langer received death threats for serving as Shakaa's defence lawyer during the court cases.

The far-right Gush Emunim movement condemned Shakaa's release, saying that there was "no limit to the capitulation of the government to the Palestine Liberation Organization." Leaders of the settler Shomron Regional Council announced their intention to form "self-defence" committees in response to the protests and the concurring unrest over the Elon Moreh settlement.

=== In Palestine ===
Mayor of Bethlehem Elias Freij, widely considered to be a moderate in Palestinian politics, stated that "I know Mr Shaka, the Mayor of Nablus, and I know that he is personally opposed to the killing of innocent people on either side of the Israel-Arab conflict," and called for the Israeli government to allow Shakaa "to appear on television to express his true views and to release him pending the court hearing which will determine his future." Mayor of Halhul Mohammed Milhim stated that "they think they will stop the flow of nationalism, but our people have been very quick to respond. We are standing as one man. We are all Bassam Shaka." Deputy Mayor of Nablus Zafer al-Masri claimed that Matt had been "baiting" Shakaa, saying that it was "unfair, to stand against him and decide to deport him while asking him to speak freely."

Journalist Ghassan Bishara of Al Fajr stated that "Israel has already expelled at least 1,156 individuals from the West Bank and Gaza over the past 12 years. Most were deported under the same accusation made against Shaka; that is, agitation and open opposition to Israel's occupation of Palestinian and Arab land. But self-determination and national independence are principles too powerful to be shelved because of any such attempts at intimidation."

Mayor of Bethlehem Elias Freij described the decision to release Shakaa as "wise and courageous." Gaza City Mayor Rashad al-Shawwa, who had been known to have tense relations with mayors in the West Bank, stated following Shakaa's release that the affair "has brought together the West Bank and Gaza Strip, which the Israels have tried to divide since 1967."

=== Internationally ===
According to William Claiborne of The Washington Post, the arrest of Shakaa "seemed to baffle a world audience conditioned by the Camp David Peace Accords to expect conciliation and moderation. The world seemed to be asking, in collective astonishment: How can Israel expect to negotiate with people they seem so bent on humiliating?" According to Time Magazine, the arrest drew "wide international criticism of Israel and confused the Middle East peace process with Egypt."

President of Egypt Anwar Sadat stated that the Israeli government's actions "do not contribute to the creation of an atmosphere of confidence." Libyan Ambassador to the United Nations Mansour Rashid El-Kikhia described the arrest as a "violation of Mayor Shaka's human rights and those of the people who elected him," claiming that it "represents one link in a chain of illegal measures to intimidate the community leaders in the occupied Palestinian territories." Spokesperson for the United States Department of State Hodding Carter III stated that "deportation is clearly a step that has deep psychological impact on other West Bank leaders and on the population there," and called for "all parties to avoid actions that will make negotiations more difficult." Following Shakaa's release, American special representative in the Palestinian autonomy talks Sol Linowitz described the release as "a positive development."

== Analysis ==
William Claiborne of The Washington Post described the Israeli government's arrest of Shakaa as part of a "recent turn toward a tougher policy in the occupied West Bank and Gaza strip," linking it to the government's equally recent announcements that it intended to triple the settler population of the West Bank and that it intended to assert its sovereignty in the occupied territories. According to Claiborne, the arrest as well as the government's reaction to the Elon Moreh case was a "textbook example of coalition pressure politics at work in this volatile, issue-oriented society," with Prime Minister Menachem Begin needing to appease the most right-wing factions of his own party as well as the National Religious Party.

According to David K. Shipler of The New York Times, Shakaa "has been propelled to a pedestal among Palestinians on the occupied West Bank during the last month" as result of the arrest.

The mayors' decision to jointly resign initially caused controversy within the exiled PLO leadership, with Fatah leaders privately urging the mayors not to resign out of fear of overplaying their hand, and more radical factions of the PLO leadership urging the mayors to resign. According to American journalist Trudy Rubin, the affairs "strengthens the hands of the mayors who are basically in line with the most radical wing of the P.L.O. Unity has proved itself to be such a valuable tool that there might have to be compromises between Fatah and the more radical groups."

== Aftermath ==
In June 1980, Shakaa would be seriously injured in a series of car bombings carried out by the Jewish Underground against West Bank mayors, losing both of his legs. In January 1982, outgoing Israeli Coordinator of Government Activities in the Territories Danny Matt called for Shakaa to be expelled, saying that he was "actually the commander of the occupied territories for the PLO," a charge that Shakaa denied, saying that "this is not the first time Matt has talked about me." Three months later, during the March 1982 Palestinian general strike caused by the Israeli government's forced disbandment of the Al-Bireh city council, the Israeli government dismissed Shakaa from his position as Mayor of Nablus, accusing him of "general agitation, nonrecognition of the Israeli civil administration and repeated attempts to disrupt public order," and of "working to make Nablus the center of nationalist activity [in the West Bank]."
