= November–December 1981 Palestinian protests =

Palestinian wave of protests

The November–December 1981 Palestinian protests were a wave of protests and unrest across the Occupied Palestinian Territories in late 1981 over moves by the Israeli government to impose an Israeli civilian administration on the territories. A wave of widespread protests first broke out in the West Bank in November 1981, followed by a two-week general strike in the Gaza Strip in December.

== Background ==
Israel established the Israeli Military Governorate after capturing the West Bank and Gaza Strip during the Six-Day War in 1967.

In early October 1981, newly appointed Israeli Minister of Defence Ariel Sharon received approval from the Israeli cabinet to re-organise the way that the Israeli Military Governorate administered the occupation of the West Bank. Sharon's re-organisation plan called for the parts of the Military Governorate that dealt with day-to-day affairs to be staffed by Israeli civilians appointed by the Israeli government instead of soldiers, with the military retaining ultimate control. The Israeli government described the plan as a move to liberalise the occupation policy and as part of a gradual shift towards Palestinian autonomy in the Palestinian Territories, with Cabinet Secretary Arye Naor describing the plan as a "confidence-building measure."

Sharon's plan, however, was met with widespread scepticism in the West Bank, being widely regarded as a mere cosmetic change. Deputy Mayor of Nablus Zafer al-Masri stated that "It doesn't matter if the occupier is in uniform or a suit He is still on my land." Scepticism also stemmed from the Israeli government having made a number of attempts in the last few years to reduce the influence and power of local Palestinian city councils, after the 1976 West Bank local elections saw significant victories by younger, more nationalist and Palestine Liberation Organization-linked candidates. Initial speculation that the re-organisation might allow West Bank leaders who had been exiled by Israel to return did not come to fruition. As well, scepticism was fueled by the Israeli government's continued support of Israeli settlement in Palestine. Also in early October 1981, the World Zionist Organization announced plans to build at least 12 new settlements in the West Bank, with WZO settlement director Matityahu Drobles calling for at least 120 000 additional settlers by 1985.

In late-October 1981, the Israeli government announced that it would appoint Menahem Milson, an Arabic literature professor at the Hebrew University of Jerusalem, as the head of the re-organised West Bank administration. Milson had previously served as an advisor to the Military Governorate, where he had encouraged support of conservative, pro-Jordan factions within Palestinian politics that he believed to be more amenable to Israeli interests. As an advisor, Milson had also taken part in creating the Palestinian Village Leagues, based on more traditional societal structures, as an alternate Palestinian power to the PLO.

Also complicating the situation were ongoing international peace negotiations over the Arab–Israeli conflict, including the ongoing Camp David Accords peace negotiations between Egypt and Israel and the Fahd Plan, presented by Saudi Crown Prince Fahd of Saudi Arabia in 1981. The negotiations led to the Palestinian autonomy talks between 1979 and 1982. In mid-October, former American President Jimmy Carter stated that Israeli Prime Minister Menachem Begin had told him that Israel was prepared to accept a Palestinian autonomy plan proposed by American diplomat Sol Linowitz as part of the talks, however, Israeli officials downplayed Carter's statement. By mid-November 1981, Begin stated that "we have made all the concessions we can possibly make and still protect our national interests," warning that the Israeli government was only prepared to accept limited self-rule for the Palestinian Territories.

== Events ==
=== Outbreak of West Bank protests ===
Following the formal appointment of Milson as West Bank administrator on 1 November, protests broke out across the West Bank opposing the re-organisation.

The appointment and outbreak of protests coincided with a murder attempt on Israeli settler David Kopulsky, during which Kopulsky was injured after being stabbed in the back and subsequently shot two children when he attempted to shoot the assailant. In response, the Israeli military placed a curfew on Hebron and demolished the houses of two Palestinians that it arrested for the stabbing. The demolitions, carried out under the Defence (Emergency) Regulations left over from British rule, further raised fears that the re-organisation was just a cosmetic change, with Mayor of Hebron Mustafa Natche saying that the Military Governate had not responded to his requests to end Israeli settlement in Hebron. The Israeli government stated that it "will continuue this policy of liberalisation," but only "directed at law-abiding citizens, not at murderers."

The protests grew as they coincided with the 64th Balfour Day on 2 November, the annual mourning of the British government's Balfour Declaration in 1917, as Britain conquered the Palestinian region from the Ottoman Empire in World War I. That day, a number of strikes were held across the West Bank, and some demonstrations clashed with Israeli military forces, throwing stones and in one incident in Beit Sahour, a Molotov cocktail. That day, the Israeli government also approved three new settlements in the Gaza Strip. The next day, the Israel Broadcasting Authority that it would stop referring to the West Bank as the "West Bank," using the term "Judea and Samaria" instead.

=== Birzeit University closure ===
On 4 November, the Israeli military ordered Birzeit University, one of the most influential Palestinian universities and a frequent centre of nationalist protests, closed until January and ordered all students and staff to immediately evacuate the campus grounds. The Israeli military also arrested the university's president, Gabi Baramki, along with the rest of the administration and the entirely of the student union council. On 5 December, the Supreme Court of Israel ruled that the closure order was legal after the university administration appealed.

The forced closure of the university inflamed the protests. On 8 November, the Israeli military dispersed three separate protests in Ramallah protesting against the forced closure of the university, summoning Mayor of Ramallah Karim Khalaf for questioning after he allowed one of the demonstrations to take place in the Ramallah city hall. Also on 8 November, three university students in Nablus were fined by the Israeli authorities on charges of having incited demonstrations.

The closure of Birzeit University also sparked controversy within Israel, with a group of activists and academics forming the Solidarity Committee for Birzeit University. On 7 November, a group of 100 Israeli students and professors from the Hebrew University of Jerusalem and Tel Aviv University snuck past the Israeli military cordon surrounding the university to hold a sit-down protest inside the campus calling for its re-opening. On 29 November, 49 Israelis were arrested after sneaking into the West Bank city of Ramallah to take part in a joint Israeli-Palestinian protest organised by the committee. The Israeli military had attempted to prevent the protest from being held by sealing off the city and by preventing non-settler Jews from travelling through the surrounding area. The Israeli military made the arrests after forcibly dispersing the protest using tear gas.

=== Continuing West Bank protests and Israeli crackdown ===
On 10 November, the Israeli military carried out a wave of mass arrests across the West Bank in an attempt to suppress the protests. As part of the wave, the military ordered Jerusalem-based and PLO-linked newspaper Al Fajr closed for 10 days and arrested . The military also surrounded the town of Beit Sahour and Bethlehem University, sealing them off and threatening to order the university closed if its administration did not prevent its student from taking part in demonstrations. The military also welded shut the doors of several shops had been closed in a commercial strike as part of the protests.

On 11 November, demonstrations were held in six different cities across the West Bank, with stones being thrown at Israeli military cars in some cities and one gasoline firebomb being thrown in Dura. One 15-year-old Palestinian, Mohammed Abdel Jarrar, was shot and injured by Israeli soldiers at a demonstration outside a girls' school in Jenin. The Israeli military stated that Jarrar had incited the demonstration of the school's pupils and had run away holding a knife when Israeli soldiers fired warning shots to disperse the demonstration. That day, Israeli forces also arrested Palestinian journalist Akram Haniyah.

Over the weekend of 14–15 November, a group of An-Najah National University students began a sit-down protest and hunger strike.

On 16 November, the Israeli military demolished five houses in the West Bank in retaliation for firebombs that had been thrown at Israeli military vehicles during the protests. The military stated that three of the houses in Beit Sahour belonged to families who had teenage sons who had thrown Molotov cocktails. The other two houses were in Al Jib and in Ramallah, with the Israeli military not giving a specific reason for the demolitions.

=== Assassination of Yusuf Khatib ===
On 17 November, Ramallah Region Village Association head Yusuf Khatib and his son were ambushed by a group of Palestinian militants, with Khatib being severely wounded by gunfire and his son being immediately killed. The Ramallah Region Village Association was one of the Palestinian Village Leagues that collaborated with the Israeli authorities. Khatib would die of his injuries at the Hadassah Medical Center on 23 November. The Palestinian Liberation Organisation claimed responsibility for the assassination.

Following the assassination, the Military Governorate announced that it was considered plans to distribute weapons to the Palestinian Village Leagues.

=== Gaza general strike ===
December 1981 Gaza general strike
- Date: 2 December 1981 – 16 December 1981
- Location: Gaza Strip, Occupied Palestinian Territories
- Methods: Strike action, general strike, protest, stone throwing

Parties
Gazans	Israel Defense Forces; Israeli Military Governorate

Lead figures
Rashad al-Shawwa	Yosef Luntz

Casualties
- Death: 1 Palestinian youth
- Injuries: 3+ Palestinians; 1+ Israeli soldiers
- Arrested: 4000 Palestinians

In late-November 1981, the Israeli government announced that it intended to impose a civilian occupation administration on the Gaza Strip in the same way as on the West Bank, to be led by General Yosef Luntz, the military administrator of the Gaza Strip occupation.

In response, a general strike was launched in Gaza City on 2 December 1981. In calling the strike, Gaza City mayor Rashad al-Shawwa described the Israeli move as "a continuation of Israeli occupation under the disguise of a civil administration," saying that "the Israeli grip is getting stronger and stronger on the Gaza Strip and we feel that the Israeli authorities are blacking out any news about Gaza. We want to do something to make the world see and understand that we are not happy, that we are against occupation." The general strike involved closure of all schools, shops, and factories within Gaza, and soon spread to other parts of the Gaza Strip.

Although originally planned to last only two days, by 5 December, local leaders in Gaza decided to extend the strike. In response, the Israeli occupation authority moved to dissuade shopkeepers from joining the strike by welding shut the doors to their shops and destroying the locks, forbidding shopkeepers whose doors had been welded from reopening for a 50-day period with the threat of legal punishment.

On 7 December, a youth protest in Rafah in support of the strike developed into a clash with a patrol of Israeli soldiers sent to disperse the protest. After the demonstrations began throwing stones at the soldiers, the soldiers opened fire, killing one protestor and injuring three others. The killed protestor was 16-year-old Mahmud Abu Nahla. An additional 400 Rafah youth were arrested by Israeli forces. One Israeli soldier was injured.

On 8 December, the Gaza City council announced that it would hold a press conference for foreign reporters to explain the decision to go on strike. In response, the Israeli military announced that it would be banning reporters from entering the Gaza Strip. That day, Israeli forces claimed to have welded shut the doors to 170 shops in Gaza and to have the confiscated the identity cards of the shopkeepers. In the West Bank that day, a 24-hour general strike was held in the city of Nablus in solidarity with the Gaza general strike. A sit-down protest in support of the strike was also held in front of the Bethlehem city hall. On 9 December, Israeli forces raided the Ramallah Women's Training Centre, run by UNRWA, after students of the Centre held a demonstration in support of the Gaza strike, arresting 200 of the students.

The funeral for Mahmud Abu Nahla was held on the morning 9 December, with Israeli authorities only allowing the immediate family to take part and imposing a curfew on Rafah.

According to the Jordan News Agency, by 11 December, at least 4000 Palestinians had been arrested by Israeli forces without being charged since the beginning of the strike, with around 2500 of those having been formally charged and at least 1000 still in detention without being charged. According to the New Zealand Press Association, by 14 December, around 1000 shopkeepers in the Gaza Strip had had their identity cards confiscated and were facing prosecution in front of an Israeli military tribunal for their participation in the strike.

On 16 December, Gaza City mayor al-Shawwa declared an end to the general strike.

== Reactions ==
=== In Palestine ===
Mayor of Bethlehem Elias Freij stated that the Israeli government had "promised the Army wouldn't go into schools and would end roadblocks and collective punishment. What is this? It is worse than ever now." Mayor of Beit Sahour Hanna Al-Atrash accused the Israeli government of "collective punishment."

=== In Israel ===
Following the outbreak of the protests, Israeli Minister of Defence Ariel Sharon stated that "the new policy does not mean a more lenient approach, but the opposite. We shall treat the peaceful population more gently but the terrorists will be treated more harshly." Sharon also stated that Palestinian youth who threw stones at Israeli soldiers would be considered terrorists under the new policy.

Labour Alignment MK Victor Shem-Tov criticised the government's crackdown, saying that "collective punishment will cause a further deterioration of the situation in the administrated areas. It will tarnish Israel’s image and not improve its security," while Labour Alignment MK Yossi Sarid accused the government of "brutality." On 18 November, Hadash MK Charlie Biton was thrown out of the Knesset after comparing Sharon to Adolf Hitler for Sharon's response to the protests.

Major General Danny Matt resigned as Coordinator of Government Activities in the Occupied Palestinian Territories, saying that the new policy rendered his role redundant.

=== Internationally ===
The Egyptian Ministry of Foreign Affairs stated that the Israeli responses to the protests and the Gazan general strike "harm the trust and cast doubts" on Israeli intentions in peace negotiations.

Committee on the Exercise of the Inalienable Rights of the Palestinian People chair Massamba Sarré stated that "the situation in the occupied territories remains extremely tense and explosive, and the acts which have been committed there in violation of General Assembly and Security Council resolutions will continue to exacerbate tensions in the region and to endanger international peace and security."

== Aftermath ==
Following the Sabra and Shatila massacre in September 1982, Menahem Milson resigned as West Bank administrator in protest over the Israeli government's initial refusal to launch an inquiry into the massacre.

== See also ==
- List of strikes in Palestine
- Timeline of strikes in 1981
- Golan Heights Law
