= 1976 West Bank local elections =

1976 local elections in the West Bank

Local elections were held in the West Bank on 12 April 1976, on the order of Israeli military authorities and under the 1955 Jordanian municipal elections law. About 63,000 voters cast their ballot, a voter turnout of 72%. The result was a victory for supporters of the Palestine Liberation Organization.

== Background ==
The holding of elections was the idea of Shimon Peres, who hoped to establish moderate local leadership in the West Bank that would accept his idea of autonomy. Prior to the elections, he estimated that Palestinian nationalist candidates would win around one third of city councils and would have minimal success in winning mayoral positions. He also believed that the Land Day unrest that had swept through the Palestinian territories in March 1976 had represented only the actions of youth provoked by the PLO, and not the beliefs of a majority of adult Palestinians, and that Palestinian women would represent a more conservative voter bloc than Palestinian men. Peres pledged that the Israeli government would allow nationalist politicians to take office if they won and that candidates in the election would be allowed to campaign freely on municipal topics.

According to Ala Alazzeh of Birzeit University, "Israeli security was estimating that the pro-PLO nationalists would win the election but the government went on with the election based on the opinion of the Prime Minister’s advisor on Arab affairs. He was an Orientalist scholar who insisted that ‘tradition would win out and that the interests of the Hamula [family clan] is still more powerful than modern politics.’"

== Electoral system ==
The elections were held under an amended version of the 1955 Jordanian electoral law, which granted the right to vote to all Palestinians over the age of 21, the law having previously restricted the franchise to male property owners. The changes in the franchise were opposed by Jordan, citing the Fourth Geneva Convention, which stated that an occupying power should maintain the status quo in any occupied territories", although the PLO supported the reform.

Candidates were prohibited from holding public campaign rallies and from using explicitly nationalist campaign slogans.

== Campaign ==
=== Candidates ===
A total of 538 candidates presented themselves for a total of 205 seats. 60% of the candidates were between 30 and 50 years-old, with 30% over 50 and 10% under 30.

=== Events ===
Prior to the elections, Hebron mayor Muhammad Ali Ja'abari and Nablus mayor Ma'zoz Masri announced their intentions not to retire from politics. However, as both mayors were conservatives and incumbents, the Israeli government tried to pressure them into reversing their decisions and running to keep their offices.

According to Israeli researcher Moshe Maoz, during the election campaign "whereas the pro-Jordanian conservative candidates half-heartedly organised themselves along their traditional and fragmented hamula lines, the pro-PLO nationalists systemically and enthusiastically prepared their campaigns with well-organised public-oriented slogans."

Some controversy was caused in late March when the Israeli government announced the deportation of two prominent Palestinians from the West Bank: Ahmed Hamzi Natshi, a surgeon from Hebron, and Abdul-Azziz Haj-Ahmed, a dentist from al-Bireh. Both were ordered deported on accusations of having helped organised recent unrest in the occupied territories and both had planned to run as leftist nationalist candidates for mayor in the April elections in their respective cities, with Natshi in particular being seen as having a good chance at winning.

== Results ==
According to Ian Lustick "the nationalists won overwhelmingly in Hebron and Beit Jala, and obtained strong majorities in Nablus, Ramallah, Al-Bireh, Tulkarm, Beit Sahour, and Jericho. The greatest upset was in Hebron, where the pro-Hashemite Jabaris were displaced by young professionals in the national bloc. Only in Bethlehem did the incumbent non-PNF mayor, Elias Freij, keep his post. But even he observed that the new mayors and council members represented a better educated, younger, and more outspoken group of politicians. Several of the newly-elected nationalists did not hesitate to express their overt support for the PLO."

The elections saw a change in demographic of the elected politicians; 67% were under 50 compared to 40% in the 1972 elections. The proportion of white-collar workers also increased from 20% to 40%. Fourteen of the 24 elected mayors were new to office.

City	Elected mayor
Beit Jala	Bshara Daoud
Beit Sahour	Hanna Atrash
Bethlehem	Elias Freij
al-Bireh	Ibrahim Taweel
Gaza	Rashad al-Shawa
Halhul	Mohammed Milhim
Hebron	Fahd Qawasmi
Jenin	Ahmed Camal A Sadi
Jericho	Abdul Aziz Swaiti
Nablus	Bassam Shakaa
Qalqilya	Amin Nasser
Ramallah	Karim Khalaf
Tulkarm	Hilmi Hanoun
Source: Lukacs, JTA, ARIJ

== Reactions ==
=== In Israel ===
The election results shocked the Israeli government. Peres's initial statement, the night of the results, was that "This is not a day of mourning for Israel. I see it as a national challenge with which we will now have to grapple," however, he warned the newly elected candidates against using their position to speak on the Israeli-Palestinian conflict. Minister of Welfare Zevulun Hammer, on the other hand, claimed that the election "proves that if we return the West Bank to Jordan or so‐called moderates, it will pass immediately —in a matter of hours—into the hands of the P.L.O." Infighting over the election would soon develop within the cabinet, with other ministers, particularly Minister of Foreign Affairs Yigal Allon, accusing Peres of having failed to predict the nationalist victory and accusing Peres of sabotaging plans to gradually cultivate a pro-Israeli local leadership in the West Bank.

=== In Palestine ===
Elected Mayor of Ramallah Karim Khalaf said of the results, "Could the message be more clear? The vote shows the whole world that the West Bankers are Palestinians who want to establish their own national entity and put an end to the Israeli occupation."

== Aftermath ==
The election of nationalist mayors and city councils in 1976 would become a significant flashpoint in the Israeli-Palestinian conflict in the late 1970s and early 1980s. According to historian Wendy Pearlman, the elected mayors and the subsequently-formed National Guidance Committee, which grouped together a wide range of prominent Palestinian figures, would play leading roles in organising mass demonstrations in the Occupied Territories in the late 1970s and early 1980s, which was met with increased Israeli suppression of Palestinian nationalism and attempts to foster alternative, non-PLO-linked Palestinian leadership, such as the Palestinian Village Leagues. According to Israeli researcher Moshe Maoz, the results were "crystal clear to all parties concerned that municipal office had become by now tightly interwoven with the politicisation of West Bank life."

A significant wave of protests broke out across Palestine in November 1979 after the Israeli government attempted to remove Mayor of Nablus Bassam Shakaa from his position. In May 1980, following a Fatah attack that killed six yeshiva students, the Israeli government arrested and deported Mayor of Halhul Mohammed Milhim and Mayor of Hebron Fahd Qawasmi for being members of the PLO Executive Committee. The two mayors were not implicated in the attack. In June 1980, extremists Israeli settlers attempted to assassinate three of the mayors, resulting in Shakaa losing both his legs and Mayor of Ramallah Karim Khalaf losing one leg. Later that year, the Israeli government announced that it would indefinitely block further local elections from being held in Palestine, claiming that further elections would "cause damage to the peace process."

In March 1982, the Israeli government ordered the city council of Al-Bireh immediately disbanded and mayor Ibrahim Tawil removed from his post, accusing them of refusing to cooperate with the Israeli Civil Administration. A week later, the government ordered Mayor of Nablus Bassam Shakaa and Mayor of Ramallah Karim Khalaf immediately expelled from their positions, accusing them of "general agitation, nonrecognition of the Israeli civil administration, and repeated attempts to disrupt public order." The expulsions of the three mayors triggered one of the largest outbreaks of Palestinian unrest since the start of the Israeli occupation in 1967.

More elected Palestinian mayors and city councils would be expelled later in 1982. On 30 April, the Israeli government ordered the dismissal of Anabta Mayor Wahid Hamdallah, citing alleged security violations. On 15 June, it ordered the disbanding of the Nablus and Dura city councils, accusing the councils of supporting the PLO. On 6 July, Mayor of Jenin Shawki Mahmoud, citing a refusal to meet with Civil Administration head Menahem Milson. On 9 July, Mayor of Gaza City Rashad al-Shawwa. Al-Shawwa, widely considered a moderate, and the Gaza City council had refused to work in the city hall since the general strike, working from home instead in a symbolic protest, and had refused to sign an order from the Israeli military forbidding them from making political statements. On 14 July, Mayor of Deir Dibwan Rashid Hijazi, the eighth Palestinian mayor to be forcibly dismissed in five months, with Israeli officials claiming that Hijazi had led a work slowdown since the general strike.
