= National Guidance Committee =

The National Guidance Committee (also known as the National Steering Committee; Arabic: لجنة التوجيه الوطني) was a Palestinian nationalist organisation. Initially formed in 1978 following the Camp David Accords between Egypt and Israel, the National Guidance Committee reunited elected munipical leaders with the leaders of local organisations (particularly labour unions, women's committees, and youth groups) in the occupied Palestinian territories. Working under a non-violent framework, the members of committee aimed to serve as a coordinating body for local leadership of Palestinians. The Committee ultimately dissolved after it was banned by the Israeli government in 1982.

== History ==
=== Formation ===
The National Guidance Committee was initially formed in late 1978, following a large Palestinian rally in East Jerusalem opposing the newly-signed Camp David Accords between Egypt and Israel. Local Palestinian leaders opposed the Accords on the ground that it did not guarantee the self-determination of the Palestinian people, that it would determine the status of the occupied territories without involving any Palestinians in negotiations, and that it treated the West Bank and the Gaza Strip as potentially separate issues. The local leaders also distruted the intentions of the Israeli government, then led by Menachem Begin's Likud (who openly opposed the establishment of an independent Palestinian state), and were equally opposed to Palestine being governed by Jordan. After the rally, leaders of elected Palestinian city councils, labour unions, women's committees, youth groups, and the local branches of nationalist groups agreed to form a coalition to coordinate their activities and be a leadership body for Palestinians in the occupied territories. The Committee was intended to act as a non-underground, non-violent political organisation. The initial proposal for the Committee came from Palestinian communists.

Head of the Engineers' Association Ibrahim Dakkak served as secretary-general of the organization. A number of elected mayors served on the Committee: Mayor of Nablus Bassam Shakaa, Mayor of Tulkarem Hilmi Hanoun, Mayor of Ramallah Karim Khalaf, Mayor of Jericho Abdul Aziz Swaiti, Mayor of Al-Bireh Ibrahim Tawil, Mayor of Anabta Wahid Hamdallah, Mayor of Halhul Mohammed Milhim, and Mayor of Hebron Fahd Qawasmi. The members of the Committee also included journalists Akram Haniyah, Mamoun Alsayed, and Bashir Barghouti, as well as a number of labour union and civil society representatives, including head of the Palestine Red Crescent Society Haidar Abdel-Shafi, In'aash al-Usra head Samiha Khalil, the head of the Supreme Islamic Council, and the head of the Birzeit University student council. The committee's headquarters were in the Federation of Professional Unions in Jerusalem.

=== Activity ===
Following the Committee's establishment, it quickly acquired widespread legitimacy among Palestinians. The Committee has been described as "the highest authority of the Palestinian people inside Palestine" at that time (as opposed to Palestinians in exile) and as "one of the first major expressions of indigenous Palestinian leadership" during the 1970s following Israeli occupation and the Camp David process. Scholar Salim Tamari described the National Guidance Committee thus: "The NGC...became the rallying coalition for Palestinians inside the oPt occupied Palestinian territories] resisting the occupation.

Tamari has noted the left-leaning stance of the NGC in contrast to Fatah and "pro-Jordanian figures in the West Bank."

=== Relationship to the PLO ===
Despite proclaiming allegiance to the PLO and at times coordinating its activities with the PLO, relations between the Committee and the PLO central leadership were at times tense. According to Roger Friedland & Richard Hecht, "the Palestinians at home wanted to make their own decisions, for which they expected PLO endorsement abroad. The National Guidance Committee insisted that it, not the PLO outside, be the one to disburse funds from outside. Fatah expected local Palestinians to take their marching orders from outside. Despite considerable political and financial pressure, the National Guidance Committee countermanded Arafat's instruction; it criticised his diplomatic coordination with Jordan, it demanded that the Arab states' funds go directly to their people inside the territories and not be used to engorge Fatah and Jordanian patronage further. When Arafat tried to appoint Mayor Elias Freij to the National Guidance Committee, the membership beat him back."

Scholar Michael R. Fischbach has argued that the committee acted as "a major bridge between local Palestinian activities in the territories and the Palestinian Liberation Organization (PLO) in exile." Fischbach also argues that "the establishment of the committee was an indication of the growing importance of the Occupied Territories in the wider PLO strategic thinking, as well as of its new generation of leaders."

=== Decline and banning ===
The Israeli government moved to repress the Committee, and to promote the rural, clan-based Palestinian Village Leagues instead, while also encouraging the growth of the fundamentalist Muslim Brotherhood. In May 1980, mayors Qawasmi and Milhim were arrested and deported. In August 1980, the three journalists on the Committee were arrested, and kept under administrative detention (including some periods of solitary confinment) for two years. On 11 March 1982, the Israeli government announced that it had banned the Committee. In the following weeks, most of the elected mayors and city councils would be disbanded by the Israeli authorities, and most of the remaining members of the Committee placed under administrative arrest.

A lesser factor in the decline of the Committee between 1980 and 1982 was infighting. Nationalist hardliners argued that the Committee was failing to stand up to Israeli repression, communists argued that the Committee was failing to foster decentralised local leadership, Fatah supporters argued that the others were undermining the unity and status of the PLO and were failing to appreciate Arafat's growing pragmatism, and pro-Jordanian supporters argued that the others were too left-wing and were undermining Palestinian unity.

Another lesser factor in the decline of the Committee between 1980 and 1982 was attacks by extremist Israeli settlers. In June 1980, members of the Jewish Underground carried out the June 1980 West Bank bombings, severely injuring Shakaa and Khalaf, as well as several other bombs that failed to hit their targets, including one that instead injured several in a Palestinian school and one that was spotted and defused before Tawil entered his car. According to Yehuda Litani of Haaretz, "Committee members feared for their lives, and were convinced that the Underground's activities had the backing of the Israeli authorities."

== Assessments ==
Roger Friedland & Richard Hecht have argued that, "the Palestinians had chosen leaders who repudated the PLO's political program, who were willing to accept a territorial compromise, who accepted a small Palestinian state as a final solution. But these leaders were unwilling to renounce the PLO, unwilling to disregard the rights of their kin in the diaspora. If they had not themselves lost their homes to the Israelis, there were few who did not have refugees among their families and friends. Israeli would repeatedly expel Palestinians nationalists who supported partition and a Palestinian state."

== Aftermath ==
Some commentators have argued that the National Guidance Committee acted as an inspiration for the First Intifada in 1987. According to scholar Salim Tamari, "the guiding framework of civil resistance embodied by the Palestinian National Front and the NGC were critical to the mass mobilization of the First Intifada." The banning of the Committee in 1982 also helped create the conditions for the First Intifada, notably by encouraging the emergence of underground, decentralised leaderships groups in Palestine. According to Rex Brynen of McGill University, following the decline of the nationalist municipal leadership, "the level of popular organization grew dramatically in the form of student, trade union, and women's organizations. Such organization (and the diffuse local leaderships they spawned) proved far more resistant to Israeli countermeasures than the earlier reliance on a relatively small number of public nationalist figures. In terms of elite types, this form of organization also provided new mechanisms for participation and upward political mobility, both in urban centers and in rural areas and the camps, and would provide much of the organizational underpinning for the intifada."

== See also ==
- Israeli Occupation of the West Bank
- Arab Thought Forum
- Ibrahim Dakkak
- First Intifada
