= Timeline of strikes in 1982 =

Strikes in 1982

In 1982, a number of labour strikes, labour disputes, and other industrial actions occurred.

== Background ==
A labour strike is a work stoppage caused by the mass refusal of employees to work. It is usually a response to employee grievances, such as low pay or poor working conditions. Strikes can also occur to demonstrate solidarity with workers in other workplaces or pressure governments to change policies.

== Timeline ==
=== Continuing strikes from 1981 ===
- 1980-82 Ashtabula nurses' strike, 570-day strike by nurses at the Ashtabula General Hospital on Ohio, United States, one of the longest nurses' strikes in American history.
- 1980-82 Costa Rica Institute of Technology strikes, series of strikes by students at the Costa Rica Institute of Technology demanding better access to scholarships and democratisation of the institution.
- 1981-82 Holy Rosary Hospital strike, 23-day strike at the Holy Rosary Hospital in Oregon.
- 1981-82 Standard Fruit strike, 37-day strike by Standard Fruit Company banana pickers.

=== January ===
- Great Bombay textile strike
- 1982 Texaco strike, 7-month strike by Texaco refinery workers.

=== February ===
- 1982 Catavi mine strike, strike by miners at the Catavi mine in Bolivia for wage increases.
- 1982 Edmonton transit strike
- 1982 Golan Heights Druze general strike, 5-month general strike by members of the Druze community in Israel in the Golan Heights protesting the Israeli annexation of the Golan Heights and following the arrests of four leaders of the community on charges of incitement against Israel.

=== March ===
- 1982 Long Island Jewish Medical Center strike, 27-day strike by Long Island Jewish Medical Center staff over the Medical Centre's refusal to recognise the National Union of Hospital and Health Care Employees as the nurses' union.
- March 1982 West Bank general strike, general strike in the West Bank following the Israeli occupation government's dismissal of elected Palestinian nationalist mayors in the West Bank.

=== April ===
- One-day general strike across 15 Muslim-majority countries called by King Khalid of Saudi Arabia after an Israeli army reservist killed two in an attack on the Dome of the Rock.
- 1982 Buenos Aires Herald strike, 5-day strike by Buenos Aires Herald distributors.
- 1982–84 French auto strikes fr strikes led by immigrant workers in the automobile industry in France against low salaries and discrimination.

=== May ===
- 1982 NHS strike, by healthcare workers in the United Kingdom, with significant sympathy strikes by miners in Wales.
- 1982 Northwest Airlines strike, 26-day strike by Northwest Airlines machinists.
- 1982 PSEG strike, 38-day strike by electrical workers at the Public Service Enterprise Group in the United States, represented by the International Brotherhood of Electrical Workers.

=== June ===
- 1982 garment workers' strike, organised by the International Ladies Garment Workers Union in Chinatown, Manhattan.
- 1982 Greek bank strike, 6-week bank strike in Greece, the longest in 15 years.
- 1982 IBP strike, by IBP, Inc. workers, represented by the United Food and Commercial Workers, in the United States against a four-year wage freeze.
- 1982 Olympic Airlines strike, by Olympic Airlines flight attendants in Greece.

=== July ===
- 1982 British Rail strike, 2-week strike by British Rail staff.
- 1982 Denver bus strike, 26-day strike by bus drivers in Denver, represented by the Amalgamated Transit Union.

=== August ===
- 1982 animators' strike, 2-month strike by animators in Los Angeles, the United States, over runaway productions.
- 1982 Capri boatmen's strike, strike by boatmen in Capri, Italy, demanding to receive a share of increases in ticket prices.
- 1982 demonstrations in Poland
- 1982 Queensland general strike, general strike in Queensland, Australia, demanding a 38-hour working week.

=== September ===
- 1982 Arab citizens of Israel general strike, general strike by Arab citizens of Israel following the Sabra and Shatila massacre.
- 1982 Detroit teachers' strike
- 1982 NFL strike, 57-day strike by NFL athletes in the United States demanding establishment of a wage scale based on percentage of gross revenues.
- 1982 Jewish strike in Rome, strike by the Jewish community in Rome in protest against a visit by PLO leader Yasser Arafat to Rome where he was met by Italian president Sandro Pertini and Pope John Paul II.
- 1982 Teaneck teachers' strike, 19-day strike by teachers in Teaneck, New Jersey.

=== October ===
- 1982-83 Caterpillar strike, 206-day strike by Caterpillar Inc. workers in the United States, represented by the United Auto Workers, one of the longest strikes in UAW history.
- 1982 Ecuador general strike, general strike in Ecuador in protest of flour and gasoline prices.
- 1982 New York legal aid strike, 9-week strike by legal aid lawyers in New York City over wages and the firing of a lawyer in Brooklyn.

=== November ===
- 1982 Chrysler Canada strike, one-month strike by Chrysler Canada workers, represented by the United Auto Workers.

=== December ===
- 1982 Bethlehem University strike, by students at Bethlehem University in the West Bank following the Israeli military's move to deport eight British and American teachers who refused to sign pledges saying they would not "give any services directly or indirectly which will help or support the so-called Palestine Liberation Organization or any other hostile organization."
- 1982 Fulton Fish Market strike, 2-week strike by workers of the Fulton Fish Market in New York City, represented by the United Seafood Workers.
- 1982 Israel public sector strike, over cost-of-living.

== See also ==
- Early 1980s recession
