= 1980–81 West Bank teachers strike =

The 1980–81 West Bank teachers strike was a three-month strike by state school teachers in the Palestinian West Bank from December 1980 to March 1981.

== History ==
Over 7000 Palestinian state school teachers in the West Bank paid by the Israeli Military Governorate went on strike in mid-December 1980. The teachers' demands included: a 100% pay raise, further pay raises to be linked to a cost of living index, and an end to the Israeli policy that blocked any promotions for the teachers. The teachers also called for West Bank schools to have access to better equipment and education specialists.

Palestinians were generally forbidden to strike under the Israeli occupation regulations. Military Governor of the West Bank Binyamin Ben-Eliezer responded to the strike by issuing an Israeli Military Order declaring the strike illegal. The order failed to convince the teachers to stop striking. As the strike continued, it Mayor of Nablus Bassam Shakaa played a major role in assisting the teachers. In early March 1981, a widespread one-day commercial strike was held throughout West Bank cities, including Nablus, Hebron, Bethlehem, Ramallah, and East Jerusalem, organised by the National Guidance Committee in support of the teachers. The Israeli military attempted to break the sympathy strike by breaking open the locks of shops that closed for the strike and forcing shopkeepers to open. The Israeli military also moved to disperse demonstrations helds by students in March in support of the strike using tear gas.

In mid-March 1981, a deal was reached between the teachers and Ben-Eliezer to end the strike. The deal included immediate 5% pay raises, an additional adjustment of salaries to a cost of living index, and end to the promotions freeze. In total, the deal represented a pay raise of around 75% for Palestinian teachers.

Several prominent organisers of the strike faced harassment from Israeli officials following the conclusion of the strike, including over twenty of the teachers being fired by the Military Governorate without cause. When the average grade for Palestinian students taking the Tawjihi university entrance exam in 1981 was lower than it had been in previous years, the Israeli government publicly blamed the teachers' strike.

== Reactions ==
The Jordanian government, which still claimed sovereignty over the West Bank at the time, issued a statement opposing the strike. According to Mark Heller, the Jordanian government's declaration led to "a barely submerged clash between Jordan and the PLO over handling of the issue."

== Analysis ==
According to the United States House Committee on Foreign Affairs, the teachers' strike was one of three major strikes in territories occupied by Israel in 1981, the other two being a three-week doctors' strike in the Gaza Strip in September and a general strike by the Golan Heights Druze in December.

According to Israeli academic and former Military Intelligence Directorate head Shlomo Gazit, the strike "reflected a new trend in political activity on the West Bank. It was the first attempt to organise and strengthen the labour unions - which should have been apolitical bodies, but which included thousands of state workers - and turn them into an institutional power base for resistance to the occupation."
