= June 1980 West Bank bombings =

June 1980 bombings in the West Bank

The June 1980 West Bank bombings were a series of bombings carried out by Israeli settlers against Palestinian mayors of West Bank cities on 2 June 1980. Three car bombs were detonated, severely wounding the mayors of Nablus and Ramallah.

== Background and prelude ==
=== Background ===
Following the Six-Day War in 1967, the state of Israel began an occupation of the Palestinian West Bank. As part of the occupation, the Israeli government encouraged the establishment of Israeli settlements in the West Bank, in contravention of international law. In 1976, municipal elections were held throughout the West Bank, with the Israeli occupation authority hoping to calm unrest. However, Palestinian nationalist supporters of the Palestine Liberation Organization (PLO) won most contests.

=== Prelude ===
On 2 May 1980, the 1980 Hebron attack occurred, where a group of yeshiva students in their early-20s were ambushed by Fatah militants as they returned from a prayer service at the Cave of the Patriarchs. Six were killed and twenty injured, in what was one of the worst attacks in the West Bank since the start of the Israeli occupation in 1967. Following the attack, the Israeli occupation authority would expel two Palestinian nationalist city mayors in the West Bank, Fahd Qawasmeh of Hebron and Mohammed Milhim of Halhul, and would exile them from Palestine, accusing them of having incited the attack. The United Nations Security Council would unanimously pass a resolution condemning the expulsions as illegal, with only the United States abstaining. The attack and the subsequent expulsions significantly raised tensions in the West Bank.

== History ==
=== Bombings ===
On 2 June 1980, a series of car bombs exploded simultaneously in the West Bank. Mayor of Nablus Bassam Shakaa and Mayor of Ramallah Karim Khalaf were both seriously injured by the bombs, with Khalaf losing a leg and Shakaa losing both of his legs. Another bomb targeted an Arab school in Hebron, wounding seven. After the Israeli occupation authority ordered that the cars of all West Banks mayors be inspected, an Israeli Druze police officer named Suleiman Hirbawi was permanently blinded attempting to defuse a fourth bomb targeting the mayor of Al-Bireh.

=== Investigations ===
On 5 June, an aide to far-right rabbi and politician Meir Kahane was detained by Israeli police for questioning over the bombings. That same day, at the 100th anniversary conference of the World ORT, Israeli Prime Minister Menachem Begin stated that Israeli should not be pressed to find the perpetrators of the bombings quickly, saying that it might take time.

In August 1980, American newspaper The Washington Star would publish an article claiming that Begin had attempted to obstruct the investigation into the bombings. The Shin Bet director denied that the allegations, as did Begin himself. Attorney General of Israel Yitzhak Zamir would subsequently open an investigation into the author of the article, an Israeli journalist, for violation of Israeli military censorship laws. Ratz MK Shulamit Aloni also alleged that the Israeli government interfered with the investigations, telling American journalist Robert I. Friedman that a list of potential suspects linked to far-right movements uncovered by Israeli journalist Danny Rubinstein had been given to the government, "but the government never wanted to do anything about it."

Former deputy mayor of the Israeli settlement Kiryat Arba Zeev Friedman and the settlement's former security chief Moshe Rosenthal were arrested in early 1983 on charges of destroying evidence linked to the bombings. In 1982, explosives had been discovered wrapped in newspapers from the date of the attack and concealed in Kiryat Arba, and Friedman and Rosenthal had destroyed the explosives instead of submitting them to the Israeli police. Friedman argued that he done so to protect the reputation of the settlement, not to tamper with evidence.

=== Trials ===
In June 1984, two Israel Defense Forces officers were arrested in connection with the bombings. Major Shlomo Livyatan was charged with having planted car bombs and Captain Aharon Gilla was charged with having led the mayor of Al-Bireh to the car that he knew had been rigged. Gilla claimed that he was unaware that a bomb had been planted, and claimed that he would not have entered the garage where the car was with Hirbawi if he had known there was a bomb. Hirbawi claimed that Gilla had not in fact entered the garage with him and had instead remained in a jeep outside.

Israeli police named two other suspects in the case, Yossi Indore and Ira Rappaport. Indore, a settler from Ofra, was suspected of being on the run within Israel, while Rappaport, an American-Israeli settler, was known to be in the United States at the time the arrest warrant was issued. Rappaport had been born in Flatbush, New York City, and had previously been involved in the American civil rights movement. He immigrated permanently to Israel in 1971, and was recruited into the Jewish Underground by Yehuda Etzion, his brother-in-law. In December 1986, Rappaport voluntarily surrendered to Israeli police at Ben Gurion Airport. He was subsequently convicted for involvement in the bombings on charges of aggravated assault and belonging to a terrorist organisation, and sentenced to 30 months incarceration. After being sentenced, Rappaport stated that imprisonment was "what's called suffering for the love of Israel" and justified the bombings as necessary for law and order, saying that they "led without a doubt to a very, very peaceful time for the next year and a half."

== Reactions ==
=== In Israel ===
Israeli Prime Minister Menachem Begin described the bombings as "crimes of the worst kind." Begin, however, rejected calls to disarm the fundamentalist pro-settler Gush Emunim movement. Mayor of Jerusalem Teddy Kollek accused Begin of "philosophically" supporting the bombings, saying that "although the government is very much opposed to this, you have their philosophical support, therefore you cannot divorce it from the actions." In response, Likud chair Avraham Sharir accused Kollek of slandering Begin and of providing aid to the PLO.

National Religious Party politician and rabbi Haim Drukman expressed support for the bombings, a move that was criticised by fellow NRP MK David Glass. In 1984, Minister of Science Yuval Ne'eman described the bombings as "an illegal act," but also "an assault on individual persons who were, at the time, responsible for incitement," adding that "the fact is that after they were attacked - which, by the way, didn't cause death - we never again heard of the National Guidance Committee."

Labour Alignment MK Yossi Sarid stated that the bombings "blasted to smithereens any illusion that Israel could maintain its control of the administered territories indefinitely."

=== In Palestine ===
In response to the bombings, a general strike was declared throughout the West Bank. Israeli forces moved to prevent the strike, ordering shops in the West Bank to remain open under threat of imprisonment and dispersing gathering protests, including one outside the hospital where Shakaa was being treated. Three Palestinian youth who had attempted to remove a roadblock were injured by the Israeli forces.

Mayor of Bethlehem Elias Freij and the rest of the city council resigned in protest against the bombings, as did the Gaza City council and Mayor of Gaza City Rashad al-Shawwa.

=== Internationally ===
World Zionist Organization president Arieh Dulzin called for the perpetrators of the bombings to be "found and punished severely," and stated that Israelis and Jews would not celebrate attacks against Palestinians, unlike Palestinians responding to attacks against Israelis. Bertram Gold of the American Jewish Committee condemned the attack and stated that "the tragic cycle of violence will truly be broken only when the PLO and its supporters in the Arab world renounce terrorism, and the neighboring Arab states come forward to negotiate genuine peace with Israel."

On 5 June, the United Nations Security Council unanimously passed a motion condemning the bombings as "assassination attempts" and accused Israel of failing "to provide adequate protection to the civilian population in the occupied territories." The United States abstained from voting on the motion. In response, the Israeli government accused the Security Council of wanting Israel to withdraw from the West Bank and of failing to condemn terrorist attacks on Israelis. The same day as the government released its response, it also approved plans to expand eight Israeli settlements in the West Bank.

Following the general strike in the West Bank, United States Secretary of State Edmund Muskie called for "maximum restraint," saying that "terrorism is unacceptable for any reason by any party" and that "this is a time for cooling down of emotions and for reason to prevail over passion."

== Aftermath ==
In late July 1980, the Israeli occupation government banned further meetings of the National Guidance Committee and announced that further municipal elections in the West Bank would be indefinitely postponed, claiming that elections "would cause damage to the peace process." The next local elections in the West Bank would be held in 2004, under the Palestinian Authority.

Khalaf would undergo medical treatment in the United States, returning to Ramallah for the first time since the bombings in December 1980, vowing to "increase my efforts to establish a Palestinian state headed by the PLO." Shakaa would undergo medical treatment in Jordan, after refusing an offer by the Israeli government to be treated in Israel. He would return to Nablus in January 1981.

Ira Rappaport was pardoned by Israeli president Chaim Herzog and released from prison in 1988. As of August 2023, Rappaport was still involved in Israeli settler activism. Yossi Indore was never arrested, being sheltered by settlers until the Israeli authorities lost interest in pursuing him. His son, Yehiel Indore, was arrested by Israeli police in 2023 after the fatal shooting of a Palestinian 19-year-old.

== See also ==
- Jewish terrorism
- Israeli settler violence
- Zionist political violence
