= Salman Natour =

Israeli-Druze writer

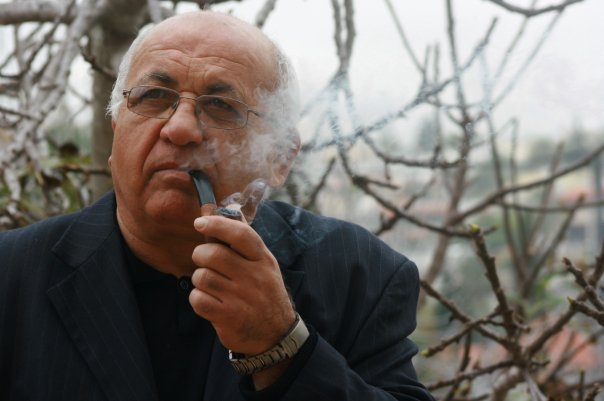

Salman Natour (Arabic: سلمان ناطور; 1949-2016) was a Druze Israeli writer and novelist, Born in Daliyat al-Karmel south of Haifa in 1949, and graduated in his hometown's high school then attained higher education in Jerusalem then in Haifa.

He was an editor for the cultural section of Al-Ittihad newspaper.

Natour published about 30 books among which was one book in Hebrew, a number in Arabic, and four books for children.

He died on February 15, 2016, following a heart attack.
