= Fahd Qawasmi =

Palestinian businessman, agriculture engineer and politician (1934–1994)

Mayor of Hebron
- In office 28 March 1976 – 1 May 1980
- Preceded by: Mohammed Ali Jabari
- Succeeded by: Mustafa Natsheh

Personal details
- Born: Fahd Dawoud Muhammad Qawasmi; 13 April 1934 Hebron, Mandatory Palestine
- Died: 29 December 1984 (aged 50) Amman, Jordan
- Cause of death: Assassination
- Resting place: Umm Al Hiran cemetery, Amman, Jordan
- Education: University of Cairo
- Occupation: Teacher; Agricultural engineer

Fahd Qawasmi (1934–1984) was a Palestinian agricultural engineer and a member of the executive committee of the Palestine Liberation Organization (PLO). He was the mayor of Hebron between 1976 and 1980. During his tenure he was among the most significant mayors of Palestine along with Hilmi Hanoun, mayor of Tulkarm, and Karim Khalaf, mayor of Ramallah. Qawasmi was expelled by the Israeli government from Palestine due to the killing of six yeshiva students during the attack on settlers by Palestinians in Beit Hadassah, Hebron, in 1980. He was assassinated by the Fatah opponent groups in Amman, Jordan, on 29 December 1984.

== Early life and education ==
Qawasmi was born in Hebron on 13 April 1934. He hailed from a politically active and wealthy family. Fayez Qawasmi, founder of Palestine Polytechnic University, was his brother. Following the Nakba in 1948 the family settled in Cairo, Egypt.

Qawasmi graduated from Cairo University obtaining a degree in agricultural engineering. He also received a Master of Science in agricultural engineering from the same university. The family returned to Hebron after Qawasmi completed his studies.

== Career and activities ==
Following his graduation Qawasmi worked as a teacher at the UNRWA schools in Jerusalem and Ramallah. Then he was employed as an agricultural engineer in the West Bank. He was also owner of a hotel in Hebron, Park Hotel. He allowed the Jewish settlers to organize a Passover Seder at the hotel in 1968 marking their return to the West Bank.

Qawasmi became the mayor of Hebron on 28 March 1976 when he was elected to the post on the list of the nationalist bloc. He was the first elected mayor of Hebron. He succeeded the Hebron's long-term mayor Mohammed Ali Jabari. Qawasmi met with the members of the Israeli peace movement and the Labor Party at his home during his mayorship.

Following the permission of the Israeli Prime Minister Menachem Begin the Jewish settler families moved to the Beit Hadassah enclave in Hebron. It was protested by Qawasmi. The Palestinians attacked the enclave and six yeshiva students were killed in 1980. Immediately after this incident Qawasmi was deported from Hebron to Lebanon on 2 May 1980. Qawasmi's tenure as mayor of Hebron ended on 1 May 1980, and Mustafa Natsheh succeeded him in the post. Rajab Al Tamimi, the judge of the Islamic court in Hebron, and Mohammed Hassan Milhim, mayor of Halhul, were also deported from the region during the same period.

Qawasmi lived in Lebanon for a while. Then Qawasmi and his family settled in Jordan and lived in the Jebel Hussein district of Amman. He thought that Israel would allow him to return to Hebron. However, after the formation of the Labor-Likud government in September 1984, his hope for returning to the city disappeared, and he became a member of the executive committee of the PLO in November 1984. He was among the independent members of the committee. Qawasmi was named as the head of the PLO's Occupied Palestinian Territory Affairs department.

=== Views ===
Qawasmi had a moderate approach towards the Israeli–Palestinian conflict and argued that any solution to this conflict and the establishment of a Palestinian state required the continuation of the Israeli state. However, like the majority of the Palestinian leaders in the West Bank he did not support the negotiations with Israel separately from the PLO which he regarded as the only representative of the Palestinian people. He announced his support for the PLO as the sole representative of the Palestinians immediately after his election as the mayor of Hebron in 1976.

== Death and burial ==
Qawasmi was murdered outside his house in Amman on 29 December 1984. The Black September Organization claimed responsibility after the incident, and Yasser Arafat argued that he was killed by the Syrians. A PLO investigation concluded that he was assassinated by Abu Khaled Al Amleh, a Fatah dissident.

His family asked permission to bury him in Hebron, but the Israeli government did not accept it. A funeral service for Qawasmi was held in Amman on 31 December 1984. He was buried there in Umm Al Hiran cemetery. The Palestinians organized a symbolic funeral ceremony for Qawasmi in Hebron on 1 January 1985. The Israeli troops stopped their march and attacked them.

A Jordanian military court sentenced four Palestinians to death on 21 January 1987 for the assassination of Qawasmi. Earlier six other Palestinians had been sentenced to life in prison for his murder. Nayef Khalil Al Bay who was one of the assassins was hanged in Jordan on 29 January 1987.

== See also ==
- Neopatriarchy
