= 1982 Golan Heights Druze general strike =

General strike by the Golan Heights Druze in 1982

Great Strike
- Date: 15 February 1982 – 21 July 1982
- Location: Golan Heights

Parties
Syrian Druze community in Golan Heights	Government of Israel; Israel Defense Forces

Lead figures
	Ariel Sharon; Amir Drori

The 1982 Golan Heights Druze general strike, also known as the Great Strike, was a 5-month general strike by members of the Druze community in the Golan Heights protesting the Israeli annexation of the Golan Heights.

== Background ==
The Golan Heights is a geographic area in southwestern Syria. The Druze are an ethnoreligious community with a strong presence in the Golan Heights, the north of Israel, the south of Lebanon, and the south of Syria. The Heights have been continuously militarily occupied by Israel since Israel's victory over an Arab coalition that included Syria in the 1967 Six-Day War. Following its occupation, the Israeli government pursued the depopulation of the Heights, with over 90% of the Syrian population fleeing or being expelled by the end of 1967, with a small population of Druze remaining in five villages in the north of the Heights. One of those villages was subsequently destroyed by the military in the early 1970s. In the 1970s, Israeli settlements began to be established in the Heights. Israeli settlements were granted water from Lake Ram, the most important source of water in the north of the Heights and seized by the Israeli government in 1967, in greater quantities and at cheaper prices than the remaining Druze population. The Israeli occupation and annexation has been repeatedly condemned by the United Nations and the international community.

A general strike is a form of strike action in which a wide, multi-sector coalition of workers and groups engage in mass refusal to work and take part in other economic activities.

== History ==
=== Prelude ===
On 14 December 1981, after fourteen years of administering the occupation of the Heights through a military administration, the Israeli government enacted the Golan Heights Law, formally annexing the area. The annexation was internationally condemned, with United Nations Security Council Resolution 497 declared the annexation "null and void and without international legal effect."

On 17 December, the Druze community launched a 3-day general strike in protest against the annexation. Later in December, the Israeli Ministry of Interior stated that the Golan Heights Druze would not be immediately forced to carry Israeli ID cards, with director general Haim Kubersky stating that the annexation would be done "gradually and reasonably."

Discontent over the annexation continued after the end of the strike, with Druze leaders writing to Israeli Prime Minister Menachem Begin that the Druze were "first of all Syrian Arabs," and warning that they "do not intend to act against the state's security, but we will resist if you force us to be Israeli citizens."

=== General strike outbreak ===
In mid-February 1982, four leaders of the Druze community in the Golan Heights who had organised protests against the annexation were arrested by the Israeli military in a midnight raid ordered by Israeli Minister of Defence Ariel Sharon. All four were charged with incitement against the State of Israel. These four were Kamal Kanj Abu Salah, Sulieman Abu Salah and his son, and Mahmoud Safadi. Kamal Kanj Abu Salah was a former member of the Syrian Parliament and had previously been arrested in 1972 on charges of being a Syrian spy.

In response to the arrests, the Druze community in the Heights declared an indefinite general strike, beginning on 14 February. As part of the general strike, shops and schools within the Golan Heights shut, people refused to pay taxes, participate in Israeli land surveys, and Druze workers refused to report to work in the Israeli settlements inside the Golan Heights. In Mas'ade, all members of the city council save for one resigned.

=== Israeli blockade ===
On the night of 25 February, the Israeli military Northern Command under Amir Drori announced that it would be blockading the four main population centres of the Druze in the Golan Heights. These were the towns of Buq'ata, Ein Qiniyye, Majdal Shams, and Mas'ade. After protests broke out in the towns, as well as in the Syrian town of Quneitra and in the Palestinian West Bank, against the blockade, the Israeli military further announced that it would be enforcing a curfew over the four towns.

The blockade included a ban on media from entering and reporting on the towns. In mid-March, the Israeli military claimed that the International Committee of the Red Cross had congratulated it on its handling of the blockade, a claim that the Red Cross denied. The Red Cross further stated that the Israeli military had prevented its representatives from choosing which people in the towns it interviewed. Villagers who attempted to break the blockade to harvest crops were arrested, and the Israeli military restricted a number of goods from being imported into the territory, including milk and baby food.

According to a 2020 paper from Brunel University London and the University of Birmingham, during the strike, "Electricity and water were cut, while crops and livestock either were deliberately destroyed or perished. Villagers responded with mass demonstrations and curfew violations to harvest crops. Moreover, they seized the opportunity to collectivise and ‘strike-in-reverse’ by creating new agricultural cooperatives, distributing food among the community, sharing work and even completing a major sewer project." The Druze used consensus democracy based on religious structures to direct the strike, with five different general meetings gathering over 2000 community members being held over the strike's course. According to Bassel Rizqallah, the Druze "agreed that should the harvest day arrive with the strike still going on, the harvest of the season would be distributed to all people. Furthermore, a scheme of providing services for free for the people were also agreed, in which everyone with a profession (from barbers to doctors) would provide his or her services without charge. This created a high level of social solidarity that intersected with national and political solidarity, strengthening the steadfastness of the Jawlani resistance and prolonging the strike. It effectively turned the Druze villages of the occupied Syrian Jawlan into a commune rebelling over the economic as well as the political control of the occupation."

In late-March, the Israeli government announced that it would be ending the blockade at the beginning of April and that the Druze would not be forced to accept Israeli I.D. cards. However, the government also stated that Druze who refused to accept Israeli I.D. cards would be barred from receiving services such as drivers licences and post. In response, Druze leaders stated that they intended to continue the strike.

On 2 April, instead of lifting the blockade as publicly announced, the Israeli military imposed further restrictions on the Druze villages. The intensification included deployment of 15 000 soldiers to the villages as well as the destruction of several homes and infrastructure. Later that day, Sharon claimed that a third of the Golan Heights Druze had been issued I.D. cards. Many of the Druze who had received I.D. cards denied having voluntarily applied for them, alleging that the Israeli military had forced them to accept the cards and had forcibly confiscated documents proving Syrian citizenship.

The largest single demonstration during the strike was held on 17 April, to mark Evacuation Day, with 6000 people participating.

In early-May, Israeli Druze author Salman Natour was arrested by the Israeli military and ordered confined to the village of Daliyat al-Karmel for six months. Natour had served as secretary of the Committee for Solidarity with the Golan, and had helped smuggle information about the siege out of the besieged villages. Later in May, the Israeli Supreme Court refused to lift his confinement so that he could testify to the United Nations Commission on Human Rights about the Golan Heights. Another prominent figure of the Committee for Solidarity with the Golan was Palestinian historian Emile Touma.

=== Resolution ===
By the beginning of June 1982, the Israeli military had abandoned the blockade, leading to the Druze community in the Heights scaling back the intensity of the strike. That month, Israel invaded Lebanon with the goal of expelling the Palestine Liberation Organization from southern Lebanon, beginning the 1982 Lebanon War. The outbreak of the war, as well as the imposition of an additional tax on the Druze to pay for the war, led to internal debates within the Golan Heights Druze communuity on how to proceed with the strike, with fears being raised the Israeli government would no longer be willing to negotiate at all. On 21 July 1982, Druze leaders in the Golan Heights met in the town of Majdal Shams and agreed to end the strike. The Israeli government pledged not to enforce conscription on the Golan Heights Druze as well as to allow the Golan Heights Druze a certain level of autonomy.

== Reactions ==
Israeli authorities claimed that the strike had been incited by Syria. Mordechai Tzipori, Israeli Minister of Communications, stated at the beginning of the strike that the Israeli government should facilitate the voluntary departure of any Druze who didn't wish to become Israelis into Syria-controlled territory.

The Settlers' Association promoting Israeli settlement in the Heights condemned the strike, calling for Jews in Israel to deny the Druze services and jobs.

Haim Cohn, who had served on the Supreme Court of Israel until his retirement in 1981, condemned the Israeli repression of the strikes at an Association for Civil Rights in Israel press conference, saying that "this is barbaric law." In response to Cohn's accusations, the Israeli military released a statement saying that it had been acting "with patience, tolerance and considerable restraint" and that emergency regulations were "a legitimate and integral part of the Israeli law." Minister of Internal Affairs Yosef Burg described Cohn's accusations as "vicious." Cohn received support from Labour Alignment MKs Yossi Sarid, who called for Israeli soldiers to disobey illegal orders, and Uzi Baram, who called for a special session of the Knesset over the repression.

== Aftermath ==
According to Israeli historian Ahron Bregman, the general strike "became a major event in the occupied Golan's history as it led to great social changes: Golani women were empowered, as they played an active role at the front line during confrontations with the army and the police, leading to a dramatic increase of Golani girls finishing secondary school after 1982; and while only one woman went to university prior to the strike, dozens of women studied in universities in Israel and abroad in subsequent years." The general strike would also have a strong impact on Palestinians inside the Palestinian territories occupied by Israel, serving as a model of non-violent resistance that Palestinians would attempt to replicate in the First Intifada.

The outbreak of the 1982 Lebanon War would have a significant impact on the wider Druze community in the Levant. The Lebanese Druze largely sided against the Israeli-backed Lebanese Forces, while Israeli Druze saw significant internal debates over the war. In July 1982, Israeli Druze leaders wrote an open letter to Israeli President Yitzhak Navon asking him to restrain the Phalangists, a far-right Christian Lebanese paramilitary and Israeli ally in the war, from pillaging Druze villages in Lebanon. Israeli Druze would hold a number of protests later in 1982 against the Israeli alliance with the Phalangists, with politician Zeidan Atashi stating that "if the Druze in Israel are expected to be brothers to the Jews in the IDF, the IDF cannot give arms to the Phalange forces to use it against us." According to R. Scott Kennedy of the Resource Center for Nonviolence, "Israeli officials, anticipating the invasion of Lebanon, felt pressure to diffuse the crisis in the Golan because they knew Israeli Druze soldiers and Lebanese Druze were certain to be involved."

Kamal Kanj Abu Salah died in September 1983. His funeral procession, held in Majdal Shams, saw thousands of Golan Heights Druze participate, with thousands more Syrian Druze elsewhere in Syria holding demonstrations in mourning. The funeral also saw speeches by Lebanese Druze leader Walid Jumblatt and Palestine National Council figure Khaled al-Fahoum.

As of October 2024, the Israeli occupation of the Golan Heights is still in place, and Israeli settlement in the Heights continues. In 2019, the United States became the first country to formally recognise the Golan Heights as Israeli territory. Israeli officials lobbied the United States into recognizing "Israeli sovereignty" over the territory.

== Commemorations ==
Demonstrations commemorating the strike have been held annually in Majdal Shams on 14 February. In some years, demonstrations by Druze on the non-occupied side of the ceasefire line in the Heights have held concurrent demonstrations.

In 1987, 13 Golan Heights Druze were arrested during that year's annual demonstration after the demonstration clashed with Israeli forces, injuring 5 Israeli police officers. The demonstration that year was also marked by the unveiling of a statue of Sultan al-Atrash, who led the Great Syrian Revolt against the French in the 1920s. In the 1988 annual demonstration, 25 Golan Heights Druze were arrested, with at least 33 injured, after Israeli police fired tear gas and rubber bullets. 4 police officers were injured by stone throwing. In the 1996 annual demonstration, Druze leaders claimed that Israeli settlements in the Golan Heights were "the root of all evil."
