= Hilmi Hanoun =

Palestinian businessman, journalist and politician (1913–2001)

Mayor of Tulkarm
- In office 27 October 1963 – 1998

Personal details
- Born: Hilmi Yusuf Hanoun; 1913 Jaffa, Ottoman Empire
- Died: 29 July 2001 (aged 87–88)
- Party: Palestinian National Party (until 1956)
- Education: American University of Beirut

Hilmi Hanoun (Arabic: حلمي حنون; 1913–2001) was a Palestinian businessman, journalist and politician. He served as the mayor of Tulkarem between 1963 and 1998.

== Early life and education ==
Born in Jaffa in 1913 Hanoun hailed from a landowning family based in Tulkarm. His mother, Asya, was the sister of Yousef Haikal and was a graduate of the English Girls' School in Jaffa. His father was Yusuf Hanoun. He had three siblings: Rushdi, Rasha and Awni. The family left Jaffa in the early period of World War I and settled in Tulkarm in November 1914.

He graduated from the American University of Beirut in 1934 obtaining a degree in commerce.

== Career and activities ==
Following his graduation Hanoun was involved in the citrus marketing business and became a member of the Jaffa Chamber of Commerce. He cofounded a newspaper entitled Ash Shaab in Jaffa in 1947 and was its editor-in-chief. He settled in Tulkarem after the Nakba in 1948. He joined the Palestinian National Party and left the party in 1956. He was elected to the Tulkarem City Council in 1961.

Hanoun was elected as the mayor of Tulkarem on 27 October 1963. He was also elected as a member of the first Palestinian National Council in 1964. He was again elected as the mayor of Tulkarem on 23 April 1972 and in 1976. He remained in office until his resignation in 1998.

Hanoun was the chairman of the board of Al Fajr newspaper based in Jerusalem. He was one of the founders of the Red Crescent Hospital and Az Zakat Committee in Tulkarem. He also served as a board member of the Palestinian Housing Council. He actively took part in the establishment of the National Guidance Committee in November 1978. He was arrested by the Israeli authorities and was put under house arrest between 1980 and 1982.

=== Views ===
Hanoun was one of the early individuals at the beginning of the 1970s who regarded the Palestine Liberation Organization (PLO) as the sole and official representative of the Palestinians wherever they were living. He did not support the Jordanian authority over the independence of Palestine.

After the introduction of the autonomy plans suggested by the Israeli Defense Minister Ariel Sharon in 1981 Hanoun argued that these plans should be first accepted by the PLO and that Israel was trying to create a local leadership among the Palestinians excluding the PLO. Unlike other leading Palestinian figures Hanoun did not accept the meeting invitation of the Israeli Defense Minister Yitzhak Rabin to improve the conditions of the West Bank and Gaza Strip residents in June 1988. Hanoun opposed the Oslo Accords like other mayors in Palestine who protested them through many demonstrations.

== Public image ==
During his tenure Hanoun was one of the most significant Palestinian mayors along with Karim Khalaf, mayor of Ramallah, and Fahd Qawasmi, mayor of Hebron. The Tulkarm residents described Hanoun as an honest person stating "there is no dust on him." He enjoyed support of all factions within the PLO. The Israeli government had also a positive view of him and did not attempt to replace him with its own appointee.

== Death ==
Hanoun died on 29 July 2001.
