= Sol Linowitz =

American lawyer (1913–2005)

6th United States Ambassador to the Organization of American States
- In office 1966–1969
- Preceded by: Ellsworth Bunker
- Succeeded by: Joseph J. Jova

Personal details
- Born: December 7, 1913 Trenton, New Jersey, U.S.
- Died: March 18, 2005 (aged 91)
- Education: Hamilton College; Cornell University

Sol Myron Linowitz (December 7, 1913 – March 18, 2005) was an American diplomat, lawyer, and businessman.

== Early life ==
Linowitz was born to a Jewish family in Trenton, New Jersey. He was a graduate of Trenton Central High School, Hamilton College class of 1935 and Cornell Law School class of 1938, where he served as a trustee.

== Career ==
In the 1960s, Linowitz served as the chair of the Xerox Corporation.

Linowitz helped negotiate the return of the Panama Canal to Panama under the direction of President Jimmy Carter. In 1964, Linowitz joined David Rockefeller to launch the International Executive Service Corps, which was established to help bring about prosperity and stability in developing nations through the growth of private enterprise. Besides being a career diplomat, lawyer, and one time chairman of Xerox, he wrote two books, The Making of a Public Man: A Memoir, and The Betrayed Profession.

From 1974 to 1978, Linowitz was head of the Federal City Council, a group of business, civic, education, and other leaders interested in economic development in Washington, D.C.

On November 6, 1979, the Carter administration announced Linowitz would replace Robert S. Strauss as Special Representative for Middle East Peace Negotiations (the Palestinian autonomy talks). On December 4, the Senate Foreign Relations Committee approved his appointment.

In 1983, he received the Golden Plate Award of the American Academy of Achievement.

He was awarded the Presidential Medal of Freedom in 1998 by President Bill Clinton.

Business positions
Preceded by Harold S. Kuhns	Chairman of Xerox Corporation; April 18, 1961–1966	Succeeded by Joseph C. Wilson
