= Bassam Shakaa =

Palestinian mayor

Mayor of Nablus
- In office 1976–1982

Personal details
- Born: 1930 Nablus, Mandatory Palestine
- Died: July 2019 (aged 88–89) Nablus, Palestine

Bassam Shakaa (Arabic: بسّام الشكعة, romanized: Bassām al-Shak’ā) (1930 – 22 July 2019) was mayor of Nablus from 1976 to 1982.

== Early life ==
Bassam Shakaa was a member of a distinguished family in Nablus.

He became a member of the Jordanian regional branch of the Ba'ath Party in the early 1950s and as a consequence was wanted by Jordanian authorities, forcing him to flee to Syria. He was one of the fierce critics of Syria's independence from the United Arab Republic and after being jailed by the Syrian authorities following his resignation from the Ba'ath Party because of the 1966 split within the Ba'ath movement. Following his release, he moved to Egypt until amnesty from the Jordanian government when he moved back to his hometown of Nablus.

== Mayor of Nablus ==
In the 1976 West Bank local elections, the first municipal elections under universal suffrage allowed by the Israeli government to take place in the occupied Palestinian territories, Shakaa was mayor of Nablus. Shakaa had been a Palestine Liberation Organisation supporter and outspoken critic of the Camp David accords. He was also a member at this time of the National Guidance Committee.

In November 1979, the Israeli government arrested Shakaa and ordered him deported from the occupied territories. The arrest was justified on the basis of an article published in an Israeli newspaper several days earlier reporting on a private conversation held between Shakaa and Coordinator of Government Activities in the Territories Danny Matt during which Shakaa allegedly expressed support for the Coastal road massacre. The arrest sparked widespread protests throughout Palestine, including every other Palestinian mayor announcing their intention to resign in protest. After a full transcript of the conversation was leaked to the press, showing that Shakaa had stated neither support nor condemnation of the Coastal road massacre despite repeatedly being questioned by Matt (instead stating that the attack was part of a cycle of violence and further attacks were likely to happen), the Israeli government cancelled the deportation order and allowed Shakaa to resume his duties as mayor.

On June 2, 1980, he was the victim of a car bombing by members of the Jewish Underground. They also planted bombs in the cars of Ibrahim Tawil, mayor of El-Bireh, and Karim Khalaf, mayor of Ramallah. Khalaf lost one leg, while Shakaa had to have both legs amputated. Moshe Zer, one of the first Israeli settlers in the northern West Bank, led the Jewish Underground "hit team" that tried to assassinate Shakaa. Zer was convicted of causing grievous injury and belonging to a terror group, but was sentenced to only four months in prison, the time he was in jail awaiting trial, because of the state of his health and the fact that he was badly injured in an attempt of a Palestinian to murder him.

In November 1980, Shakaa would visit the Scottish city of Dundee to mark an agreement designating Dundee and Nablus as sister cities.

In a March 1981 article, Israeli newspaper Haaretz reported that the Israeli military was "harassing, interrogating and threatening anyone who gives a lift to Bassam Shaqa. It also exerts a variety of pressures on anyone meeting with the mayor," including one incident where "a military vehicle had been parked outside the Shaqa family's home all night. The soldiers had asked to see the identity papers of all those visiting and had written them down." In August 1981, Shakaa and several other Palestinian mayors would condemn the 1981 Vienna synagogue attack perpetrated by the Palestinian Abu Nidal Organization.

In the spring of 1982, the Israeli government ordered the Mayor of Al-Bireh dismissed and the city council, sparking the largest outbreak of Palestinian unrest since the start of the Israeli occupation in 1967. During the unrest, the Israeli administration removed Shakaa as mayor, accusing him of "general agitation, nonrecognition of the Israeli civil administration and repeated attempts to disrupt public order" and of "working to make Nablus the center of nationalist activity [in the West Bank]," The Israeli government would subsequently dismiss most other elected Palestinian mayors and city councils, and would install an army officer in Shakaa's place, who would run Nablus for the following three-and-a-half years.

== Later life ==
Following his mayorship, Shakaa remained a strong supporter of the Palestine Liberation Organization (PLO) and continued to be politically active within Palestinian politics.

In November 1983, he and Palestine Red Crescent Society director Haidar Abdel-Shafi were invited to a meeting with British Minister of State for Foreign Affairs Richard Luce, Baron Luce in Jerusalem. Both were blocked from attending the meeting by the Israeli Border Police. Ahead of the 1984 Israeli legislative election, Shakaa joined twenty-four other prominent West Bank figures in signing an open letter endorsing the far-left Hadash party.

In 1986, the Israeli government would appoint head of the Nablus Chamber of Commerce Zafer al-Masri as Mayor of Nablus, replacing the appointed Israeli military officer. Two months after his appointment, al-Masri would be assassinated by the PFLP. Shakaa described the assassination as "very, very sad," but stated that it was "not personal."

The Oslo Accords were a blow to the resistance Shakaa and his contemporaries put up against Israeli governance during their time in mayorship and he was as outspoken against Oslo and the Palestinian Authority (PA) as he was against the agreement reached at Camp David in 1978. He remained a supporter of resistance, both violent and non-violent, against Israeli occupation and maintained his anti-normalization position, opposing negotiations.

In 1999, the Palestinian Authority put him under house arrest following "The 20 Declaration", which was signed by 20 anti-PA figures, criticizing the line the PA was going down and calling for an end to the Oslo Accords. In September 2011, Shakaa signed a petition of several Palestinian figures criticizing PA president Mahmoud Abbas' move to seek recognition of a Palestinian state based on 1967 borders at the United Nations as a distraction from the resistance that the Palestinian people must carry out. Shakaa was President of the pan-Arabist Party in Palestine (al-Tayyar al-Arabi al-Qawmi fi Falasteen). Former Nablus mayor Ghassan Shakaa and former Dutch member of parliament Arjan El Fassed are his nephews.

Shakaa died on 22 July 2019 in Nablus, aged 89.
