= Palestinian autonomy talks =

Outgrowth of the 1979 Egypt–Israel peace treaty

The Palestinian autonomy talks were an outgrowth of the Egypt–Israel peace treaty and were designed to lead to a resolution of the Palestinian nationalism in the West Bank and Gaza Strip. According to The Framework for Peace in the Middle East, one part of the 1978 Camp David Accords, Egypt and Israel were to agree within one year on elections for a Palestinian “self-governing authority.” The idea was directly related to Israeli Prime Minister Menachem Begin’s idea of Palestinian autonomy.

President Jimmy Carter appointed Robert S. Strauss as his envoy to the autonomy talks. Neither the Palestine Liberation Organization (PLO) nor any other Palestinian organization were directly involved in the talks.

The talks began on May 25, 1979 in Beersheva, Israel. The second round was held in Alexandria, Egypt on June 11–12, 1979. The third round of talks were held at Herzliya, Israel on June 25–26, 1979, followed by talks in Alexandria (July 5–6) and Haifa (August 5–6). The delegations were led by Prime Minister Mustafa Khalil (Egypt), Minister of the Interior Yosef Burg (Israel), and Ambassador James Leonard (United States). Egypt said it did not speak for the Palestinians but rather sought Palestinian elections for a council that would represent the Palestinians.

Delegates met on January 31-February 1, 1980 in Herzliya and in the Netherlands on February 27–28, 1980.

On May 8, 1980, Egyptian president Anwar Sadat unilaterally suspended the negotiations. In July 1980, the talks resumed but Egypt again suspended them. By this time, the U.S. mediator was Sol Linowitz, who had replaced Strauss in late 1979. By the end of the Carter administration. Linowitz claimed that 80% of the issues had been resolved. Wat T. Cluverius IV, who worked on Linowitz's team, later explained that while the hardest issues had not been resolved, "We had done an awful lot of the clearing of the underbrush for a serious negotiation over the toughest issues--the West Bank and Jerusalem. So there was something handed to the incoming Reagan administration."

The United States tried to re-launch the autonomy talks in 1982 but that effort was sidetracked by the outbreak of the 1982 Lebanon War. In January 1982, Secretary of State Alexander Haig traveled to the region to try to revive the talks; he did not succeed. The final blow to the Autonomy talks came on August 16, 1982, when, at the height of the siege of Beirut, the Egyptian government suspended negotiations in pending Israel's withdrawal from Lebanon.

The talks did not achieve a direct breakthrough but some of the ideas – a five-year interim period with delayed negotiations on the final status of the West Bank and Gaza Strip – were incorporated into the Oslo Accords.
