= Zafer al-Masri =

Israeli-Appointed Mayor in Palestine

Mayor of Nablus
- In office January 1986 – March 1986

Personal details
- Born: 1940
- Died: 2 March 1986 (aged 45–46) Nablus, West Bank
- Profession: Businessman

Zafer al-Masri (Arabic: ظافر المصري; 1940 – 2 March 1986) was the Israel-appointed Mayor of Nablus, for a brief period of two months (January to March 1986). He had taken office in January 1986 as mayor in Nablus, the largest Arab town in the West Bank to replace an Israeli army officer who had served as an Israeli-appointed administrator for Nablus for the previous four years (1982-1986) after the removal of Bassam Shakaa the former elected Arab mayor of Nablus in 1982 for the latter's pro-PLO positions.

== Life ==
In 1982, most Palestinian-elected mayors including Shakaa had been removed by the Menachem Begin administration. With Shimon Peres as new Israeli premier, the Israeli authorities considered Nablus as a test and were said to be planning to install other Arab mayors in Ramallah, El Bireh and Hebron. Peres had said on many occasions that it would be advantageous to Israel and the Arab Palestinian populace in the administered territories to have Palestinians administer their municipal affairs.

Prior to his appointment as mayor, until December 1985, Zafer al-Masri headed the Nablus Chamber of Commerce. His appointment as Nablus mayor by Israel had been approved by Jordan and by the relatively moderate elements of the Palestine Liberation Organization (PLO) after some 18 months of indirect contacts between Israel and Jordan. Al-Masri rejected the Israeli autonomy proposals and focused on improving conditions in Nablus. He reduced the price of electricity and begun work on extending the grid. All former employees, who had been on strike since Bassam Shakaa’s removal, were re-instated and long delayed building permits were approved. His murder was viewed as a serious setback for moderate elements seeking to involve Palestinians along with Jordan in peace talks with Israel.

Al-Masri came from a prominent Palestinian family which has been active in Jordanian political life and in Arab states of the Persian Gulf. His brother, Hikmat al-Masri, was the Deputy Speaker of the Jordanian Parliament and his other brother Sabih al-Masri is a billionaire and chairman of the Jordan-based Arab Bank. His cousin, Taher al-Masri, was Jordan's Foreign Minister. Another cousin, the billionaire Munib al-Masri, is reportedly the wealthiest person in Palestine.

== Assassination ==
Zafer al-Masri was assassinated on 2 March 1986 only two months after he took his office. A Palestinian moderate, he had close ties with Jordan. Al-Masri was shot to death by Mu'ayyad Abdul Samad as he stepped from his car near the Nablus City Hall. Al-Masri was shot several times in the heart. He was taken to Rashadiye Hospital and died on the operating table. Almost 50,000 Palestinians took part in his funeral on 3 March 1986.

It is widely believed he was killed by Abdul Samad by the orders of the Popular Front for the Liberation of Palestine (PFLP). PFLP had accused him of "collaboration with Israel". Abdul Samad was arrested and indicted for the murder receiving life imprisonment for his act. Although another group, the Fatah – Revolutionary Council, a Palestinian splinter group led by Abu Nidal, also claimed responsibility initially for the attack, this latter claim has been refuted with responsibility of PFLP clearly established.

Al-Masri was the third Palestinian mayor or ex-mayor to fall victim to an assassin in little more than two years. Fahed Kawasme, the former mayor of Hebron, had been gunned down in Amman, Jordan on 30 December 1984. He had lived there since being deported by Israel in 1980 for pro-PLO activities. On 4 September 1984, Mayor Abdul Mahmoud Kishta of Rafa, in the Gaza Strip, was fatally wounded by bullets from a passing car on a street in Rafa.

== See also ==
- List of mayors of Nablus
