= Mohammed Milhim =

Palestinian politician (1929–2021)

Mohammed Hassan Milhim
- محمد حسن ملحم

Mayor of Halhul
- In office 1976–2005

Personal details
- Born: September 4, 1929
- Died: July 17, 2021 (aged 91)
- Education: Certificate in English Literature
- Alma mater: Lebanese University
- Occupation: Politician

Mohammed Hassan Milhim (Arabic: محمد حسن ملحم; 4 September 1929 – 17 July 2021) was a Palestinian politician, who served as mayor of Halhul. He graduated from the Lebanese University with a certificate in English literature in 1974. He was elected mayor of Halhul in 1976. In 1980 he was exiled from the West Bank for being a member of the PLO Executive Committee and was allowed back 12 years later. He served as Yasser Arafat's consultant and several roles in the Palestinian Ministry of Education.
