= Elias Freij =

Palestinian politician (1918–1998)

Minister of Tourism and Antiquities
- In office 5 July 1994 – May 1997
- President: Yasser Arafat
- Preceded by: Office established
- Succeeded by: Mitri Abu Aita

Mayor of Bethlehem
- In office May 1972 – May 1997
- Preceded by: Elias Bandak
- Succeeded by: Hanna Nasser

Personal details
- Born: Elias Mitri Freij; 1918 Bethlehem, Mandatory Palestine
- Died: 29 March 1998 (aged 79–80) Amman, Jordan
- Party: Independent

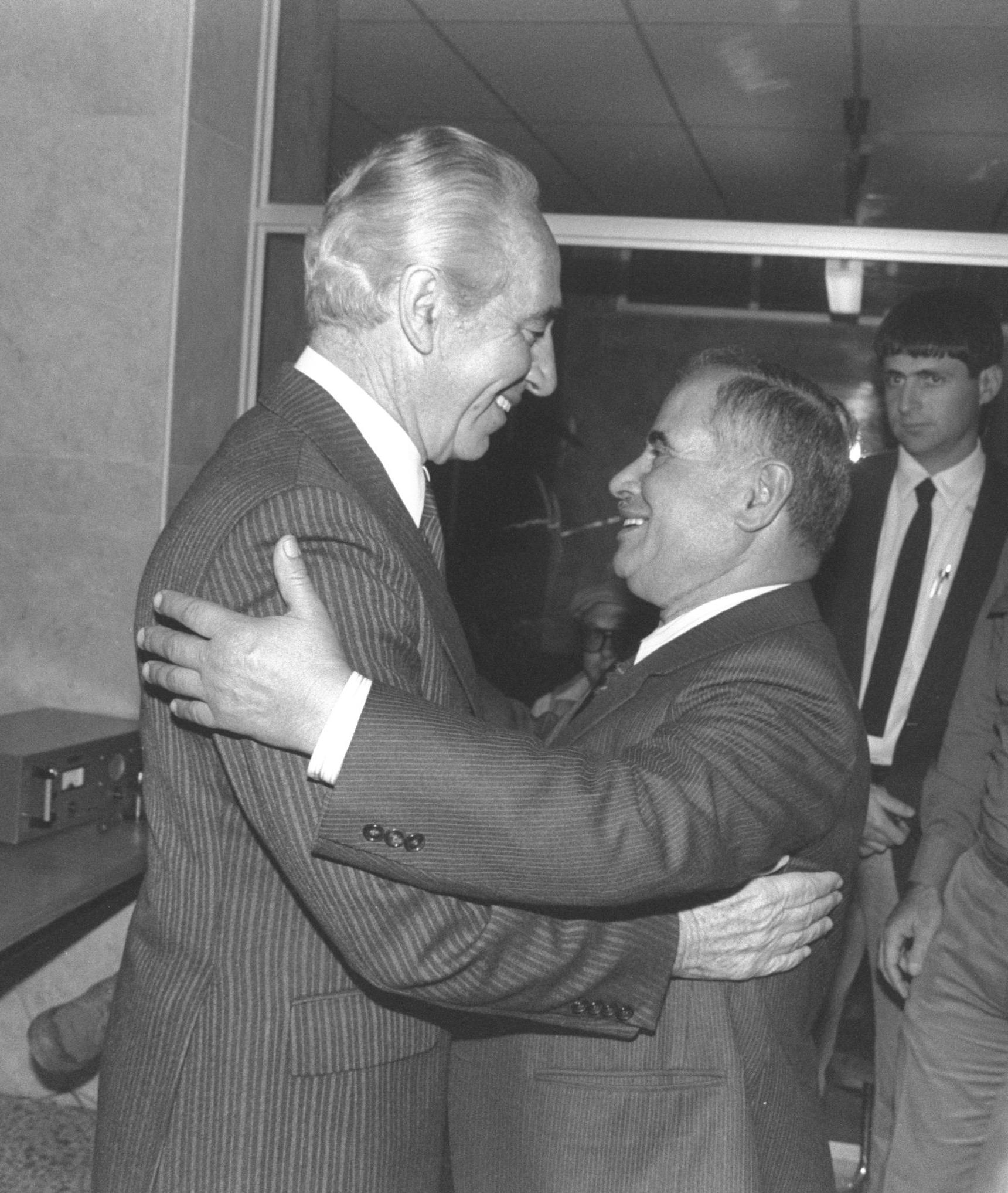
Bethlehem mayor Elias Freij greeting the Israeli prime minister Shimon Peres in Bethlehem, 1984

Elias Mitri Freij (Arabic: الياس فريج; 1918 – 29 March 1998) was a Palestinian politician. He was the mayor of Bethlehem from 1972 to 1997.

Freij was born in 1918 in Bethlehem to a Palestinian Christian family which could trace its residence in Bethlehem back 500 years. He graduated from the British-run Bishop Gobat school in Jerusalem in 1940. In the early 1950s, he headed the local branch of the Holy Land Mission, an American Presbyterian-backed charity. As the owner of a string of shops selling olivewood and mother-of-pearl souvenirs, he was appointed to Bethlehem town council under Jordanian rule in 1960. He remained on the council when Israel occupied the West Bank in the 1967 war, which had been previously occupied by Jordan in the aftermath of 1948 Arab–Israeli War.

He was named and has been set up as a mayor in May 1972 by actual elected and winner Ibrahim Salim Abu-Hmud with 1181 votes, in the second place Ayyoub Musallam with 1007 votes and Elias Freij in third place with 998 votes, in 1976 he was elected. Israel then banned all further municipal elections and Freij remained in office until he stepped down on health grounds in May 1997. He was the only elected Palestinian mayor not deposed by the Israeli military authorities for pro-Palestine Liberation Organization (PLO) leanings. He was also the only non-PLO mayor to remain in office after the Palestinian National Authority was established. Despite his independence from the PLO, he was part of the PLO delegation to the Madrid Conference of 1991 and was a close confidant of Yassir Arafat.

During his long period in office he made use of his international contacts to gain financial support for infrastructure projects, including construction of schools, administration buildings and water supply projects. In his time, Bethlehem became a twin city with Athens in Greece, Córdoba in Spain and Assisi in Italy.

Freij was an influential local figure, becoming Chairman of Bethlehem University's Board of Trustees and President of the Chamber of Commerce.

He travelled abroad frequently, and was a member of the Palestinian negotiation team to the Madrid Conference of 1991 and was appointed in 1994 as the Minister of Tourism and Antiquities in the Palestinian National Authority, a post he held until 1997. He died on 29 March 1998 in Amman, Jordan.

Political offices
Preceded by Elias Bandak	Mayor of Bethlehem; 1972–1997	Succeeded by Hanna Nasser
New office	Minister of Tourism and Antiquities; 1994–1997	Succeeded by Mitri Abu Aita
