= Karim Khalaf =

Palestinian politician

- كريم خلف

Mayor of Ramallah
- In office 1972–1982

Personal details
- Born: 1937 Ramallah, Mandatory Palestine
- Died: March 30, 1985 (aged 49–50) Ramallah, West Bank, Palestine
- Spouse: Teresa Campisi (m. 1965)
- Children: 2
- Education: Cairo University
- Occupation: Attorney

Karim Hanna Khalaf (Arabic: كريم حنا خلف, 1937 – March 30, 1985) was a Palestinian attorney and politician who served as the mayor of Ramallah from 1972 to 1982.

== Early life and career ==
Khalaf was born into a wealthy Palestinian Christian family from Ramallah. His father, Hanna Khalaf, was a businessman who immigrated to the United States in 1921 and worked there for several years before ultimately returning to Ramallah.

Khalaf attended Cairo University in Egypt, where he received a degree from the School of Law. In 1972, he was elected Mayor of Ramallah, having previously served as the city's District Attorney. Khalaf adopted largely moderate stances concerning Israel; he supported a policy of non-cooperation with the military occupation of the West Bank, but was among the first Palestinian public officials to advocate a two-state solution. In his early years as mayor, Khalaf was reluctant to deal with Yasser Arafat and the Palestine Liberation Organization. However, when he faced re-election in 1976, a split had begun to form between "pro-PLO" and "anti-PLO" politicians in the Palestinian municipalities. At this time, Khalaf began coordinating contacts with the PLO and promoting the group. This change in attitude allowed Khalaf to win a second term; in a year when many officials in the West Bank were voted out of office for not adequately backing Arafat and his aims. He won a third term in 1980. Khalaf was one of the most significant Palestinian mayors along with Hilmi Hanoun, mayor of Tulkarm, and Fahd Qawasmeh, mayor of Hebron.

Khalaf married Teresa Campisi, who was born in Cairo to Italian parents, in 1965. They had two daughters together.

== Assassination attempt ==
In early 1980, a group of Israeli yeshiva students were killed in Hebron by Palestinian militants. The Jewish Underground, an Israeli militant group, compiled a report suggesting that Khalaf and a handful of other prominent Palestinian officials had ordered the killings. In May, the group planted car bombs in vehicles belonging to several prominent Palestinian officials, including Khalaf's Cadillac sedan. The bombs seriously injured Bassam Shaka'a, the then-mayor of Nablus, and Khalaf. Both were hospitalized in critical condition, and the incident resulted in Shaka'a losing both of his legs. Khalaf lost his right foot in the attack, and used a prosthesis and walking cane for the remainder of his life. Israel's internal security service, Shin Bet, began an investigation into the bombings, but the Jewish Underground was not discovered as the culprit for several years. Members involved were sentenced to prison terms of varying lengths. No verifiable evidence was ever found linking Khalaf to the Hebron attack, and it is generally accepted that he was not involved.

== Removal from office and death ==
In March 1982, the Israeli government removed Khalaf from his mayoral post for refusing to cooperate with their administration of the West Bank.

Khalaf died of a heart attack in 1985.

== See also ==
- Palestinian Christians

== Sources ==
- "The Road to Emmaus", by James M. Wall, The Christian Century
- Brief biography
