= Shadia Abu Ghazaleh =

Palestinian political activist (1949–1968)

- شادية أبو غزالة
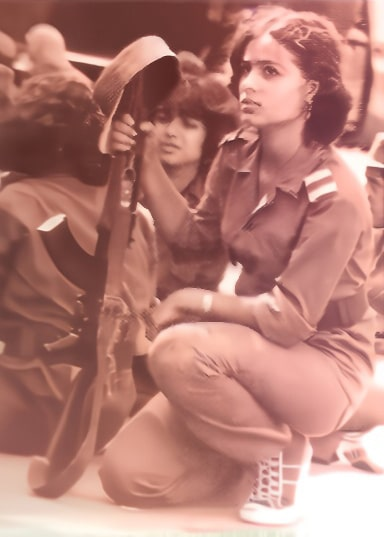
- Abu Ghazaleh, pictured c. 1968
- Born: 8 January 1949; Nablus, Jordanian-occupied West Bank
- Died: 28 November 1968 (aged 19); Nablus, Israeli-occupied West Bank
- Cause of death: Accidental detonation of an improvised explosive device
- Education: An-Najah National University
- Political party: Popular Front for the Liberation of Palestine
- Other political affiliations: Arab Nationalist Movement
- Opponent: Israel Defense Forces

Shadia Abu Ghazaleh (Arabic: شادية أبو غزالة; 8 January 1949 – 28 November 1968) was a Palestinian militant. After completing her studies, she joined the Popular Front for the Liberation of Palestine (PFLP) and was one of the first women to participate in the Palestinian fedayeen opposing the Israeli occupation of the West Bank. She was killed in an accident while preparing a bomb in her home in Nablus. She has been regarded as a martyr in Palestine and a terrorist in Israel.

== Biography ==
Shadia Abu Ghazaleh was born on 8 January 1949, in the Palestinian city of Nablus, in the Jordanian-occupied West Bank. She was educated at the Fatimid School for Girls in Nablus, and later at the Al-Aishiyah School. While she was still in school, in the early 1960s, she joined the Arab Nationalist Movement (ANM).

Upon graduating from school, in 1966, she moved to Cairo in the United Arab Republic (modern-day Egypt) where she studied sociology and psychology at Ain Shams University for a year. Following the Israeli occupation of the West Bank in 1967, she returned to Palestine, despite her family's attempts to dissuade her. She moved back to Nablus where she completed her education at An-Najah National University.

She joined the nascent Popular Front for the Liberation of Palestine (PFLP), which had been founded in 1967 by former members of the ANM. She quickly rose through the ranks to become one of the leading figures in the organisation. She was one of the first women to participate in the Palestinian fedayeen in the occupied West Bank. She organised and led women's units, and took part in a number of military operations against the occupation. By participating directly in armed action, she broke from traditional Palestinian gender roles which restricted women to the role of caregiver.

Abu Ghazaleh was killed on 28 November 1968 while preparing a bomb in her home. She planned to use the bomb to blow up a building in the Israeli city of Tel Aviv. She died when the bomb detonated accidentally.

== Legacy ==
As the first Palestinian woman to be killed while resisting the Israeli occupation, Abu Ghazaleh is widely considered a martyr by the Palestinian nationalist movement. She has also been described as a terrorist in Israeli sources.

Abu Ghazaleh has frequently been cited as an example of women's participation in armed struggle against Israel; she has been listed alongside other Palestinian militant women, including Dalal Mughrabi and Leila Khaled. Khaled herself even adopted Abu Ghazaleh's name as her nom de guerre. A portrait of Abu Ghazaleh is kept in the offices of the South African socialist organisation Abahlali baseMjondolo, alongside the portraits of several other revolutionary figures.

In early 2014, a new secondary school for Palestinian girls was named after Abu Ghazaleh; the Israeli organisations Arutz Sheva and Palestinian Media Watch claimed it to be a promotion of terrorism by the Palestinian authorities. One Palestinian student at the school held Abu Ghazaleh to be a "model of the wonderful Palestinian fighter" and said that they "follow her path in this school". In December 2023, the school was the site of a massacre reportedly carried out by the Israel Defense Forces (IDF) during the Israeli invasion of the Gaza Strip.

== Bibliography ==
- Aadnesgaard, Helen (2023). The Third Force of Ubuhlalism: Living Politics, Living Learning and Futurity (MA). Utrecht University. OCLC 1405299198.
- Abusalama, Shahd (2016). "Women Revolt: Between Media Resistance and the Reinforcement of Oppressive Gender Structures". Kohl: A Journal for Body and Gender Research. 2 (2): 200–211. doi:10.36583/2016020212. OCLC 954275171.
- Aghabekian, Varsen (2019). "Demanding a bigger role: Palestinian women in politics and decision making". Medicine, Conflict and Survival. 35 (3): 241–264. doi:10.1080/13623699.2019.1679948. ISSN 1362-3699. PMID 31680548.
- Alsaafin, Linah (17 April 2014). "The role of Palestinian women in resistance". openDemocracy. ISSN 1476-5888. OCLC 456819048.
- Hawari, Yara (28 July 2019). "The Political Marginalization of Palestinian Women in the West Bank". Al-Shabaka, The Palestinian Policy Network.
- Khalili, Laleh (2007). Heroes and Martyrs of Palestine: The Politics of National Commemoration. Cambridge University Press. ISBN 978-0-521-86512-8.
- Omar, Abdullah (March 2022). "Shadia Abu Ghazaleh 1949–1968". The Women who Made Palestinian History (PDF). London: Middle East Monitor. pp. 21–22.
- Pappe, Ilan; Mansour, Johnny (2022). "Abu Gazaleh, Shadia (1949–1968)". Historical Dictionary of Palestine. Rowman & Littlefield. p. 31. ISBN 9781538119860.
- Toubi, Asmaa (2019). "فلسطينيات خالدات في الذاكرة" [Unforgettable Palestinian Women]. Wafa (in Arabic). Archived from the original on 18 December 2019.
- Williamson, Bill (2024). Lifeworlds and Change in Palestinian Education: Liberating Learning. Routledge. doi:10.4324/9781032709529. ISBN 9781032709529.
- Zaanin, Mohamed (26 December 2023). "Classroom massacre: Survivors say Israel executed innocents in Gaza school". Al Jazeera. ISSN 1319-0253.
- "Abu Ghazaleh, Shadia (1949-1968)". Palestinian Personalities. Palestinian Academic Society for the Study of International Affairs. 2018. OCLC 45394970.
