= Hani al-Hindi =

Hani al-Hindi (1927–2016) was a Syrian politician and activist. He co-founded the Arab Nationalist Movement with George Habash and served in the cabinet of Salah al-Din al-Bitar in 1963.

== Early life ==
Hindi was born in Damascus to a prominent family from the city. His father, Colonel Mahmoud al-Hindi, had served as an officer in the Sharifian army during the 1916 Great Arab Revolt against Ottoman rule in the region, and in the Iraqi Army. Hindi's father was dismissed as a result of his participation in the failed revolt in Iraq by Rashid Ali al-Gaylani in 1941. Hindi himself enlisted in the Arab Salvation Army during the 1948 Arab-Israeli War in Palestine. At the time he was enrolled at the American University in Beirut (AUB). It was during the war that Hindi grew resentful at the abject performance of Arab armies against the Israelis, which he blamed principally on Arab disunity and collusion with the Zionists and the British government, which had controlled Palestine between 1917 and 1947. It was at the AUB where Hindi met fellow student George Habash. The latter's family was expelled from Palestine during the war and both men's experiences in that conflict left them resentful.

Intent on avenging Arab losses during the 1948 war, Hindi helped form a secretive militant group called the Phalanges of the Arab Sacrifice (Al-Kata'ib al-Fida' al-Arabi) in 1949 with other Syrian activists and exiled members of the Socialist Party of Egypt. Led by Tawfiq al-Hakim, the group offered military training and carried out a number of attacks against British and American targets in Damascus and Beirut.

== Arab Nationalist Movement ==
=== Early years ===
In 1949, Hindi also joined The Firmest Bond student society in the AUB, initially editing its newspaper, and by 1950 becoming its virtual head, along with Habash. Hindi left BAS in the spring of 1950, disillusioned by its random violent methods and preferring to develop a broader military campaign against the Israelis from across Arab borders. Hindi took particular inspiration from the Haganah, the chief Zionist paramilitary organization that later became the Israeli Army, and the Muslim Brotherhood's secret apparatus, impressed by the groups' organizational skills and discipline. Before leaving BAS, he approached Michel Aflaq, leader of the Ba'ath Party, to turn BAS into the party's armed wing, but was turned down. When BAS's Young Egypt members unsuccessfully attempted to assassinate Syrian strongman Adib al-Shishakli and prominent socialist leader Akram al-Hawrani in 1950, Hindi was briefly detained by the authorities, although he had no involvement in the plots.

Through their leadership positions in the student society, Hindi and Habash befriended other members of the grouping, including Wadie Haddad, Muhsin Ibrahim and Ahmad Al-Khatib, from Palestine, Lebanon and Kuwait, respectively. The five associates formed the founding core of the Arab Nationalist Movement (ANM), which was established in 1951-52 after their student society federated with numerous other Arab nationalist student groups from Syria, Lebanon and Jordan. The ANM's chief goals were the liberation of Palestine, ending Western imperialist influence in the Arab world, and Arab unification.

The ANM's weekly paper Al-Ra'i was shut down in Jordan in 1951, although Hindi reopened it from Damascus in January 1955. By then, the movement had grown little, having much of its potential membership sapped by other nationalist parties, namely the Ba'ath and al-Hawrani's Arab Socialist Party, which merged in the mid-1950s. Only between 1956 and 1957 did the ANM's membership increase significantly, particularly among teachers and students at Palestinian refugee camps, and to an extent the Jordanian middle class. The ANM established a military around that time under Hindi's leadership and in cooperation with the Syrian intelligence chief Abd al-Hamid Sarraj. Hindi facilitated the military training of volunteers at Palestinian-Syrian army camp in Harasta. The faction participated in the 1958 Lebanese conflict, fighting alongside Arab nationalists in Tyre and Tripoli.

=== Alliance with Nasser ===
The ANM dissolved its branches in Syria and Gaza Strip in line with the single-party system established by Gamal Abdel Nasser's United Arab Republic (UAR), but kept it other branch offices open. While the ANM did not establish relations with Nasser during the UAR period, following Syria's secession from the union in 1961, the ANM cultivated ties with the Egyptian president, who became their patron. Hindi fled to Lebanon after the secessionist coup, where he and Habash worked to rebuild the organization. Hindi visited Nasser in Cairo in 1962 and became a crucial link between Nasser and Syria's new rulers, with whom Hindi had familial ties. He conducted low-key mediation between the two sides and was rewarded by Nasser's deputy Abdel Hakim Amer with a pledge of military assistance. Ties between Syria and Egypt did not improve and the ANM was involved in the failed March 1962 coup against the Syrian government, although only to a small extent.

The ANM also had minor involvement in the successful 1963 Syrian coup d'etat by a Ba'athist-Nasserist alliance that toppled President Nazim al-Qudsi. The ANM was awarded with two seats on the National Council of the Revolutionary Command (NCRC), one of which was occupied by Hindi, who served the post of communications minister. The NCRC was the transitional government put in place following the coup. Syria and Egypt entered into reunification talks soon after the coup, but the agreement was cancelled in April following purges against Nasserists in the military, prompting Nasserist ministers, including Hindi, to resign.

On 19 July, the ANM collaborated with Nasserist officer Jassem Alwan to topple the Ba'athist government, although its regular members had little knowledge or involvement in the plan. Hindi was in regular contact with Alwan and his co-conspitators and acted as their emissary with Nasser and Egyptian intelligence. The coup attempt was violently put down, and the participants arrested or executed. Hindi fled Syria for Lebanon and the ANM's power in Syria deteriorated.

In 1964, the ANM held a National Conference in Beirut that gathered representatives of the movement throughout the Arab world. By then, the ANM had several branches across the region with growing membership, largely because of the group's association with Nasser. The movement's relationship with Nasser's government was discussed at the conference, with some members led by Muhsin Ibrahim of Lebanon advocating the ANM's complete submergence into the wider Nasserist movement, while Hindi led the skeptics in the ANM who felt Nasserism had been much weakened by the Syrian secession. A compromise was reached where the ANM would ultimately maintain its existing organs and organization with Hindi, Muhsin and younger leaders such as Nayef Hawatmeh all made part of the ten-member ANM National Command. In addition, Hindi, Habash and Ibrahim were elected to serve as tripartite general secretariat of the ANM. Following their election, Hindi and his colleagues proposed that Nasser head a pan-Arab organization consisting of all Arab nationalist groupings in the Arab world, in which the ANM would merge, but Nasser turned them down.

The ANM's activities were largely paralyzed in 1966 due to inter-organizational tensions between Hindi and Habash's faction which sought to limit unilateral military action against Israel without Arab backing, the far left faction led by Hawatmeh and Ibrahim, and the faction that pushed for immediate attacks against Israel. Following the decisive defeat of Egypt and Syria in the June 1967 Six-Day War, the ANM's credibility among Palestinians was dealt a blow. Hindi and Habash subsequently increased their efforts to establish a strong a military wing.

== Bibliography ==
- Cobban, H. (1984). The Palestinian Liberation Organisation: People, Power and Politics. Cambridge University Press. p. 140. ISBN 9780521272162. "Hindi."
- Hasso, Frances Susan (2005). Resistance, Repression, And Gender Politics in Occupied Palestine And Jordan. Syracuse University Press. ISBN 9780815630876.
- Sayigh, Y. (1997). Armed Struggle and the Search for State : The Palestinian National Movement, 1949-1993: The Palestinian National Movement, 1949-1993. Clarendon Press. ISBN 9780191513541.
