= Ibrahim Dakkak =

Palestinian politician

- Born: 1929; Jerusalem
- Died: 2016 (aged 86–87)
- Education: American University in Cairo
- Occupations: Civil engineer, Activist
- Years active: 1959-2016
- Organization(s): Palestinian National Steering Committee, Engineers Association in the West Bank, Higher Council of Education, Arab Thought Forum, Palestinian National Initiative, Birzeit University
- Known for: Reconstruction of the al-Aqsa Mosque, Co-founding the Palestinian National Liberation Front
- Notable work: Supervision of Tira College for Girls and Jordanian Shobak School construction

Ibrahim Dakkak (1929-2016) was a Palestinian civil engineer and activist. He is remembered as a leading figure in Jerusalem public life, particularly after the onset of Israeli occupation of the West Bank.

Among his most notable legacies are the reconstruction of the Al-Aqsa Mosque after it was burned in 1969 and his leadership in the development of key Palestinian educational and intellectual institutions as well as unions and political organizations.

== Early life and education ==
Dakkak was born in Jerusalem in 1929. He attended kuttab schools at the elementary level followed by the Islamic School. He earned his diploma from the Rawdat al-Ma‘arif al-Wataniyya School. In between high school and university he worked for the Jerusalem Post Office.

Following the Nakba, Dakkak went to Cairo to complete his studies. He graduated from the American University in Cairo with degrees in science and mathematics in 1952. While there he was also part of the Union of Palestinian Students.

He then worked as a teacher in Kuwait but was expelled with a number of other political activists. In 1959, he moved to Istanbul University (Robert College) to study civil engineering.

== Career ==
Dakkak returned to Jerusalem, then under Jordanian occupation, and began working for Ittihad Enterprises Company. He supervised the construction of Tira College for Girls in the city of Ramallah and then an agricultural school in Shawbak. He then founded his own company with a partner that worked on a number of other projects, including in Jericho, Ramallah, Azariyya, and Jerusalem.

Following the onset of Israeli occupation, Dakkak became more involved in organized politics as part of resistance. He worked with the Engineers Association, the Union of Pharmacists, and the Bar Association and also joined the Higher Islamic Council of Jerusalem.

He was placed in charge of architectural reconstruction of the al-Aqsa Mosque after a fundamentalist tourist set fire to it in 1969.

He was an active part of the Palestinian National Liberation Front. He also served as secretary of the Palestinian National Steering Committee (also known as the Palestinian National Guidance Committee) in the occupied territories. The committee included mayors and a spectra of the Palestinian national movement and arose specifically in the wake of the Camp David Accords between Israel and Egypt. It was headquartered at the Federation of Professional Unions in Jerusalem.

Dakkak headed the Engineers Association in the West Bank for 19 years, from 1978 until 1986. He contributed to the formation of a number of leading Palestinian civil society organizations such as the Higher Council of Education and the Arab Thought Forum, which he chaired from 1978 to 1992. He also edited the Forum's journal, Development Affairs, launched in 1987.

He was active politically during both the First Intifada and Second Intifada. In 2002, he worked on the launch of the Palestinian National Initiative with Mustafa Barghouti, Haidar Abdel-Shafi, and Edward Said. Dakkak also served as the deputy head of the Palestinian Economic Policy Research Institute. He chaired the Board of Trustees of Birzeit University first in 1973 and then from 2003 to 2006. He was founding director of Makassed Charitable Association Hospital in Jerusalem.

== Views ==
In addition to his general activism against occupation and in support of Palestinian rights, Dakkak has been characterized as a "radical socialist."

== Awards ==
Birzeit University awarded Dakkak an honorary doctorate degree in Social Development in May 2012.

He was also awarded the Medal of Merit and Distinction by Palestinian President Mahmoud Abbas.

In 2016, the publication Jerusalem Quarterly created "the Ibrahim Dakkak Award for Outstanding Essay on Jerusalem" in his honor.
