= Mustafa Barghouti =

Palestinian physician and politician (born 1954)

- مصطفى البرغوثي
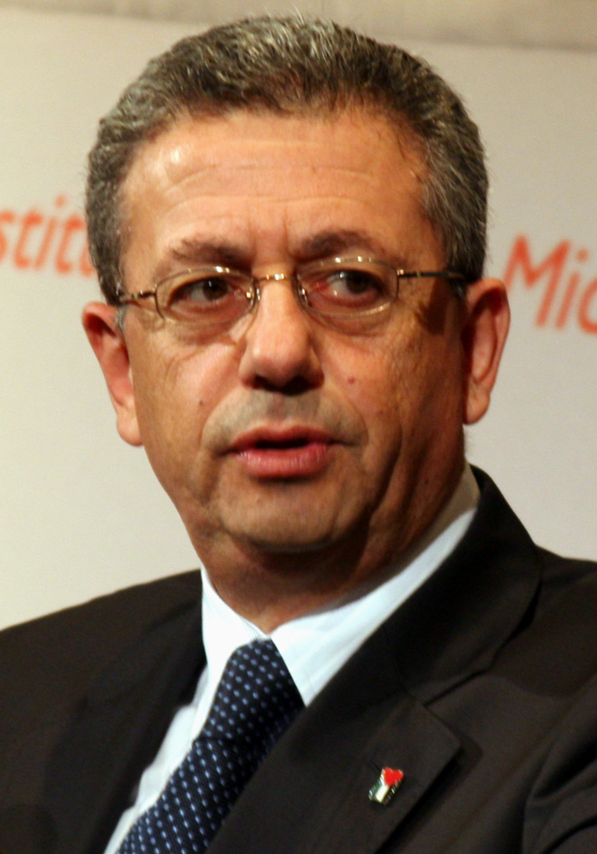
- Barghouti in 2007

Minister of Information
- In office 17 March 2007 – 14 June 2007
- Prime Minister: Ismail Haniyeh
- Preceded by: Yousef Rizqa
- Succeeded by: Riyad al-Maliki

Member of the Palestinian Legislative Council
- Incumbent
- Assumed office 18 February 2006

Secretary General of the Palestinian National Initiative
- Incumbent
- Assumed office 17 June 2002
- Preceded by: Position established

Personal details
- Born: 1 January 1954 (age 72) Jerusalem, Jordanian-administered West Bank, Palestine
- Party: Palestinian National Initiative (co-founder)
- Other political affiliations: Palestinian People's Party (until 2002)
- Spouse: Rita Giacaman
- Children: 1
- Education: Peoples' Friendship University of Russia; Kuban State Medical University; Stanford University
- Profession: Politician, physician, activist

Mustafa Barghouti (Arabic: مصطفى البرغوثي, pronounced [musˤtˤaˌfaː‿l.barˈɣuːθiː]; born 1 January 1954) is a Palestinian physician, activist, and politician who serves as General Secretary of the Palestinian National Initiative (PNI), also known as al-Mubadara, and head of the Palestinian Medical Relief Society.

He has been a member of the Palestinian Legislative Council since 2006 and is also a member of the Palestine Liberation Organization (PLO) Central Council.

In 2007, Barghouti was Minister of Information in the Palestinian unity government. He is an advocate of the use of non-violence and civil disobedience to confront Israel's illegal occupation of the West Bank, Gaza Strip, and East Jerusalem.

== Early life and education ==
Mustafa Barghouti was born 1 January 1954 in Jerusalem. His family is from what is today Bani Zeid, a municipality of over 6,000, founded in 1966 when the villages of Deir Ghassaneh and Beit Rima merged during Jordanian rule. He grew up in Ramallah and his father was the municipal engineer for the nearby village of Al-Bireh. Barghouti has said that his family "has always been very political, very active," noting that under the Mandate, his grandfather and great-uncle "were jailed by the British." He has said that he "grew up surrounded by internationalist, progressive literature," and has described his family's politics as always being "shaped by opposition to social injustice, rather than by nationalism." His father, he has noted, "used to speak to us of his Jewish comrades in Tiberias or Acre."

He has said that he was "reshaped" by the Six-Day War. "I felt a huge amount of responsibility. My childhood ended then. We were now under occupation. It was the beginning of a life mission: how do we become free? The feeling of injustice was very strong. Though still a child, I felt the whole world sitting on my shoulders…. Some gave in to defeatism—Nasser had it wrong, it was better to adopt a pro-American stance—but our position was: no, we have to resist, but in a stronger, better way. I've never felt I was fighting for the liberation of the Palestinian people on purely nationalistic grounds, one people against another. It was a fight against oppression, against occupation."

Barghouti has said that he was "very active" as a student activist in the West Bank. In 1971, he went to Moscow to study medicine and spent seven years there completing his medical training.

== Career ==
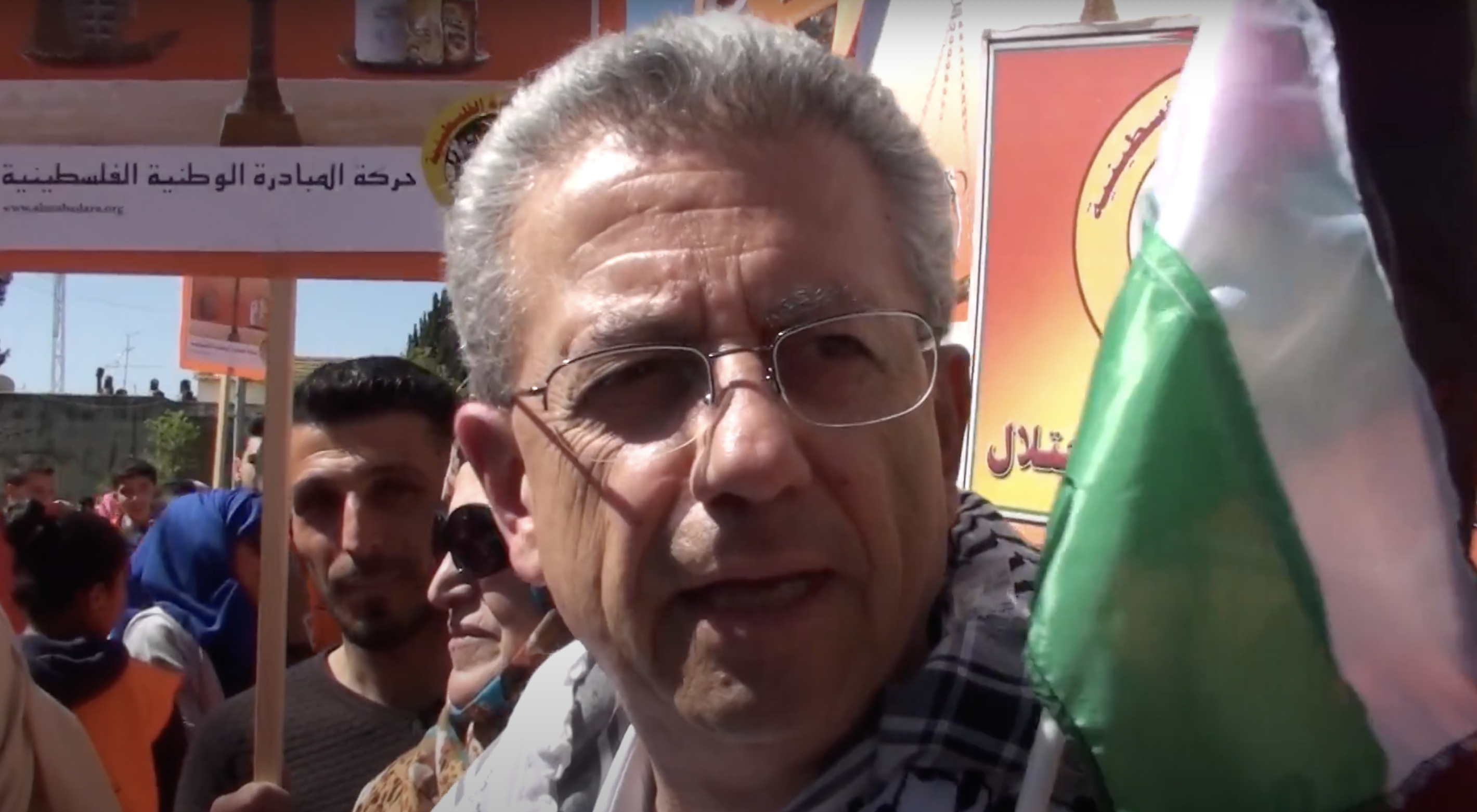
Barghouti at a 2016 protest in Ramallah, occupied West Bank

Returning home in 1978, Barghouti specialized in internal medicine and cardiology at Maqased Hospital in Jerusalem. At that time he was active in the Palestinian Communist Party. After the signing of the Camp David Accords, Barghouti said that he and his comrades "realized...that we couldn't rely on Egypt, Syria or any other country, that we could expect nothing from outside. We would have to be self-reliant, self-organized. Resistance would have to mean defying the Occupation, defying the Israeli rules."

While he was at Maqased, he and "five or six" medical colleagues founded Medical Relief (MR), a volunteer organization that has developed into "a whole network of primary health-care centres, mobile clinics and outreach programmes." By 1986, "there were MR committees all over the Occupied Territories, including Gaza." During this time, Barghouti pursued further studies in Jerusalem, then received an MSc. in Business Administration and Management from Stanford University.

Barghouti served as Secretary-General of the Palestinian People's Party (formerly the Communist Party) and represented it in the Palestinian National Council, the legislative body of the PLO, until his resignation from the PPP in 2002. He stood for election in the 1996 PLC elections, running as a candidate in the Ramallah district, but lost out narrowly after a recount.

Barghouti, at an event in Brisbane, Australia in 2013, providing an example of the impact of the Palestinian Medical Relief Society's work in the occupied Palestinian territories (minute 2:06 to 4:51).

Barghouti is the President of the Palestinian Medical Relief Society, an NGO that provides health and community services to people in the Occupied Territories. He is also the Director of the Health Development Information and Policy Institute, an independent Ramallah-based think-tank that engages in policy research and planning for the Palestinian health-care system in the West Bank and Gaza Strip. Additionally, he was one of the founders, in October 2001, of Grassroots International Protection for the Palestinian People, a program that seeks to protect Palestinians, including those engaged in nonviolent protest, by arranging for international civilian witnesses to be present at potentially violent encounters between Palestinians and settlers or members of the IDF.

Barghouti was nominated for a Nobel Peace Prize in 2010 by Mairead Maguire, who had won the prize in 1976.

=== Madrid Conference of 1991 ===
In 1991, Barghouti was a delegate to the Madrid Conference, which was held with the aim of ending the Israeli–Palestinian conflict and the First Intifada.

At Madrid, he has said, "we sought to consolidate Palestinian unity—it was crucial that Israel should not succeed in erecting a wall between internal and external representatives." Barghouti has complained that "Oslo was decided behind the back of the Palestinian delegation to Madrid, and by extension, behind the back of the Palestinian people." He has described the Oslo negotiations as "a technical and political disaster," complaining that while "the Madrid team had been well briefed and had 600 experts at its disposal, the PLO's Oslo negotiations were conducted by amateurs." Israel, he has said, took "gross advantage of the naïvety of the Palestinian negotiators," but the result was "so disastrous, so unjust, that even the signatories couldn't make it stick....This is why democracy is so important in these cases: because it renders the negotiators accountable to the people, answerable for every document they sign."

Barghouti said that after 1993, he and his colleagues "were conducting a struggle on two fronts," against the Israeli Occupation and against the Palestinian Authority. "Not only were our leaders completely inept at negotiating with Israel, but they were rapidly transforming themselves into a gigantic security apparatus…consuming 34 per cent of the budget." The PA, he has complained, "has functioned along the same lines as the totalitarian Arab governments that gave it refuge," trying "to control every aspect of life."

=== 1996 Injury During Medical Duties ===
In 1996, Barghouti, was shot by an Israeli sniper while providing medical assistance to injured civilians in the West Bank as part of his role in the Palestinian Medical Relief Society (PMRS). He credits this incident to deepening his commitment to nonviolent resistance and human rights advocacy.

=== Palestinian National Initiative ===
Barghouti, at an event in Brisbane, Australia in 2013, explaining the strategy of the Palestinian National Initiative (minute 5:13 to 6:11)

In June 2002, Barghouti, Haidar Abdel-Shafi, Ibrahim Dakkak and Edward Said established the Palestinian National Initiative (PNI), al-Mubadara al-Wataniyya al-Filistiniyya, an attempt to build a reformist, inclusive alternative to both the established Palestine Liberation Organization and to Islamic militant groups such as Hamas. Barghouti currently serves as the PNI's general secretary.

Barghouti has explained that the PNI's "origins lie in the uprising of September 2000." When the Second Intifada broke out, "we were in the streets arguing that this was the Independence Intifada—whereas Hamas called it the Al-Aqsa Intifada." The leaders of the PPP, he charged, "didn't understand the importance of this distinction, this affirmation of secularity." Accordingly, Barghouti decided that the time was ripe "to found an alternative democratic opposition without the Party," and to that end he "got in touch with Abd al-Shafi, Ibrahim Dakkak and Edward Said, who became a very close friend during his last years." Barghouti's goal was to bring about "a renaissance of the Palestinian movement, on a footing that the outside world could understand." The PNI's manifesto, issued in October 2000, presented "a secular programme for a non-violent, non-militarized Intifada, signed by 10,000 supporters." The organization, however, was not officially established until June 2002, "at the time of the Israeli re-invasion."

PNI opposes the Israeli Occupation, calls for a sovereign Palestinian state, and supports the Palestinian right of return. Among the PNI's stated objectives are the establishment of a united Palestinian leadership, the promotion of democracy in the Occupied Territories, and the strengthening of contacts between Palestinians. It describes itself as focusing on the release of prisoners and detainees in Israeli jails, mobilizing Palestinians in the Occupied Territories and abroad, empowering civil-society organizations, and building international support for the Palestinian cause. The group's ultimate goal is to establish an independent Palestinian state that is secure, democratic, free, and governed according to the rule of law.

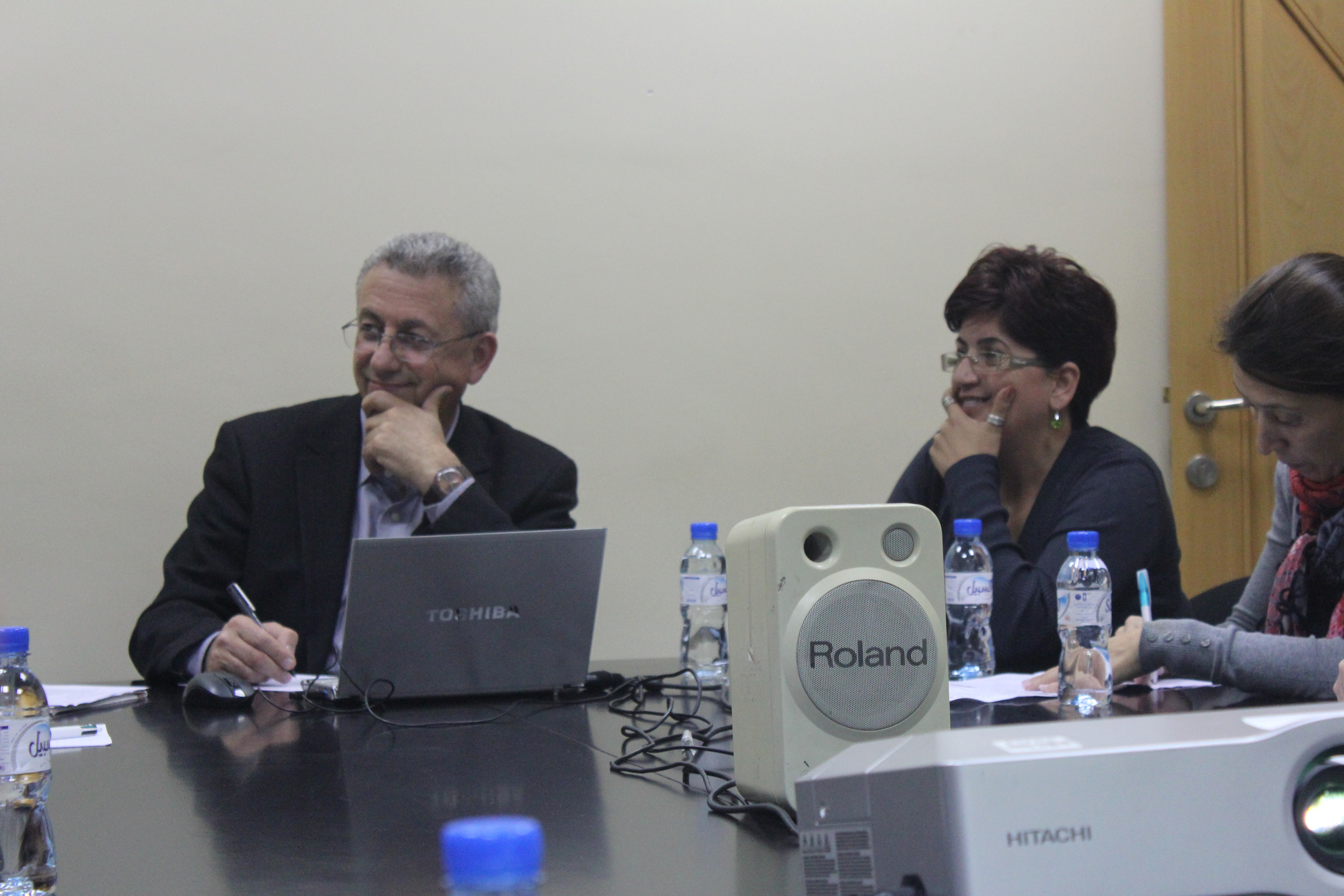
Mustafa Barghouti participating in a meeting in November, 2014

Barghouti describes the PNI as "a democratic coalition" that is open to the whole range of secular left-wing individuals and groups—unions, the women's movement, civil-society organizations. He claims that it seeks "to become an umbrella for various movements." According to Barghouti, the PNI's "one uncompromising rule" is that it "will only accept groups that are completely independent, both from Hamas and other fundamentalist movements, and from the Authority." It has "worked with a variety of Israeli groups—Women in Black, Gush Shalom, Yesh Gvul, Ta'ayush—demonstrating against the invasion of Iraq or against the apartheid Wall." Its strategy, Barghouti has said, "is to try to link popular struggle against the Occupation with action on the ground designed to help people stay where they are—for if they stay, Israel has failed; whereas if they go, it's we who are defeated." It is important to the PNI both to provide "direct assistance" to Palestinians and to resists "the fundamentalists", Barghouti has said.

On 3 January 2003, Barghouti was arrested following an international press conference in East Jerusalem, on charges of disturbing the peace and entering the city illegally. During his detention, Barghouti was interrogated and suffered a broken knee, which, according to his account, was inflicted by blows from a rifle butt; he also reported that he received head injuries. He was released several days later. Barghouti was also detained on 3 January 2006 while campaigning in the Arab quarter of East Jerusalem and was taken for questioning to a local police station. A statement on his behalf read: "Dr Barghuthi was meeting with ordinary Jerusalemites near Damascus Gate, discussing their needs and the situation of Palestinians in east Jerusalem, when he was approached by six undercover Israeli security agents, arrested, and taken to the Russian Compound jail where he remains under detention."

In a 2012 interview, Barghouti emphasized that the PNI is committed to nonviolence, which "works better because it allows everybody, and not just a small group of people, to participate. It works better because it does not allow the Israelis to claim that they are victims in this conflict. It reveals and exposes them as they are in reality: the oppressors, the occupiers, and the creators of an apartheid system."

Barghouti, at an event in Brisbane, Australia in 2013, expressing his view that the freedom of Palestinians is tied with the freedom of Israelis (minute 11:16 to 12:58).

At a March 2013 press conference occasioned by US President Barack Obama's visit to the Occupied Territories, Barghouti, noting that Obama's stated goal was "to listen", protested that "We Palestinians have been listening for too long. This passivity on Obama's part is unacceptable and dangerous at a time when the two state solution is under risk." Barghouti also lamented that Obama would not be going to Hebron, "where the geographical segregation system is very clear", and said that, given comments made by Obama in his famous Cairo speech, he had hoped that Obama would at least "issue severe condemnations against Israeli violence against Palestinians in nonviolent resistance protests" and "praise Palestinian nonviolence as we have stuck with that end." Barghouti was also disappointed that Obama, having visited the graves of Yitzhak Rabin and Theodor Herzl, would not be visiting Arafat's grave, and that he would be visiting the Eretz Israel Museum, which "contains stolen Palestinian artifacts".

=== 2005 PNA presidential election ===
Barghouti announced on 29 November 2004 that he would be a candidate in the 9 January 2005 election to choose a successor to the just-deceased Yasser Arafat as President of the Palestinian National Authority. Barghouti was endorsed by his fellow PNI co-founder Dr. Haidar Abdel-Shafi. He became Mahmoud Abbas's main challenger after his cousin Marwan Barghouti, who was in jail for leading an uprising, withdrew from the race. Barghouti, who was "widely seen as an outsider", campaigned on a platform of change and major PA reforms. "People are fed up with the system, they are fed up with corruption, they are fed up with favouritism, and people want change," he said at a campaign rally. He called for Israel's withdrawal from the Gaza Strip, West Bank, and East Jerusalem, the release of Palestinian prisoners, and the establishment of a sovereign Palestinian state.

He did not enjoy the backing of any major political party, however, and ended up losing to Abbas, receiving 19.8% of the vote. Conceding defeat, he said, "I feel very happy, and very proud," and said he would win "next time". Referring to his role as head of the PNI, he said: "We are now the second most important political force in Palestine, ahead of Hamas. This is very, very important."

His campaign, he said, encountered several obstacles, including use of the PA's resources in favor of Abbas. He also claimed that, while campaigning, he was "harassed by Israeli soldiers on seven occasions" and arrested twice; meanwhile, Arab TV stations "backed the Fatah candidate." Still, Barghouti argued, "we managed to bring together a solid democratic coalition" consisting of "independent unions, workers' committees, eminent figures of the democratic left such as Abd al-Shafi, moderate Islamists including Abd al-Sattar Qasim, and many groupings from Palestinian civil society."

=== 2009 Daily Show interview ===
Barghouti appeared on The Daily Show in October 2009 with fellow activist Anna Baltzer, telling Jon Stewart: "We are struggling for liberty. We are struggling for freedom. We are struggling for justice. It is Palestinians who have been subjected to the longest [ongoing military] occupation in [modern history] and a system of subjugation that is totally unjust."

=== 2012 tear-gas incident ===
Barghouti claimed that at the annual Land Day protest in Bethlehem in 2012, he was struck in the head by a canister of tear gas shot by Israeli forces. "I was hit with a tear-gas bomb on the side of my head and my back," Dr. Barghouti told a reporter from his hospital bed. "My scalp is injured, my right ear has problems, and they are checking to see if I have any spinal injury."

=== Gaza war ===
Following the October 7 attacks and the beginning of Israel's assault on Gaza, Barghouti reiterated his opposition to attacks on civilians, saying that "I am against any killing of any civilian, whether Palestinian or Israeli. And we're sorry for all those people who were killed, Palestinians and Israelis." In addition to condemning the attacks on civilians on October 7, Barghouti also condemned threats made by Hamas to harm hostages and advocated for a ceasefire and exchange of prisoners, which he claimed that Hamas was willing to pursue.

The war in Gaza resulted in a humanitarian catastrophe, and the Palestinian Medical Relief Society, which Barghouti runs, has been active in the Gaza Strip, providing critical medical care. Barghouti has argued that Israel has been committing genocide in the Gaza Strip, stating that "The ultimate goal of Israel is ethnic cleansing," like the ethnic cleansing of Palestinians in during the 1948 Nakba. Barghouti has also placed blame on the United States for its diplomatic and military support to Israel: "What we see is a shameful position from the side of the United States of America, which is providing full support to Israel to continue these massacres in Gaza." He argued that, "Without American political and military support, Israel would not have been able to continue its ruthless occupation and apartheid against Palestinians or to commit the genocide in Gaza."

In 2024, Barghouti said that he continues to believe in a peaceful political resolution to the conflict, where Palestinians are guaranteed national rights and Israel ends what Barghouti describes as its system of apartheid, occupation, and oppression. He argued that, "Apartheid, which Israel is conducting, and the system of racial discrimination will not provide solutions. Only a system where we are all equal — we and the Israelis — have equal rights, only then can [we] really have true peace and justice." In October 2024, in honor of President Jimmy Carter's 100th birthday, Barghouti authored an opinion piece in which he praised Carter for his "legacy of moral courage and clarity" and for his 2006 book, Palestine: Peace Not Apartheid. He wrote that, "As we celebrate and reflect on Carter’s life and legacy, let us amplify his call for the U.S. to be a genuine force for peace and justice around the world. Let us recognize, as Carter wanted, that peace in our Holy Land will only come when the rights and dignity of Palestinians are acknowledged and respected. Only then will we truly be able to honor his legacy and the values he stood for so bravely."

== Views ==
Barghouti, at an event in Brisbane, Australia in 2013, describing an instance of non-violent, organized action that he helped organize in al-Walaja, a village in the occupied West Bank (minute 0:05 to 1:25).

Barghouti has criticized the PLO and Palestinian Authority for corruption. He supports non-violent resistance as the most effective means of overcoming Israeli occupation. According to a Reuters report, Barghouti "supports peace with Israel based on two states with a Palestinian state in all territory occupied by Israel in the 1967 Middle East war, a capital in Arab East Jerusalem and rights for refugees." He has indicated that recognition of a right of return is a must, but that this could likely be implemented in a way mutually acceptable to both sides.

In a December 2008 article, Barghouti condemned the ongoing Israeli "state terror," in which, he charged, over "290 people have been murdered." He said it was "time to expose the myths that they [the Israelis] have created." For example, he rejected the claim that Israel had "ended the occupation of the Gaza Strip in 2005," accusing it of intensifying its "military aggression," carrying out "frequent raids and targeted assassinations," and imposing "a comprehensive siege on the Strip," forcing Gazans to live "on the edge of starvation and without the most basic necessities of human life" and causing "a humanitarian catastrophe."

Writing about the Nakba in May 2013, Barghouti called on Israel "to recognize its responsibility for this crime, as a first step towards accountability and a just solution to this conflict." He accused Israel of "living in a state of denial," noting that its "textbooks don't recognize the rights of the Palestinian people or the Nakba." He rejected "Israel's traditional narrative and founding myth," which, he argued, is belied by the reality of "horrific massacres by Zionist militias...where even women, children, and elderly Palestinians were not spared." And he said that the Nakba "is not just a tragic moment in history" but "has been an ongoing process from that time against all of the Palestinian people."

Barghouti has said that there are two possible just solutions to the Israeli–Palestinian conflict: "an independent Palestinian state" covering, at the very least, all the area within the 1967 frontiers, and with its capital in East Jerusalem, and with all settlements dismantled, or "a single democratic state," no longer exclusively Jewish, "in which all citizens are equal." He complains that Israel "has sought to trap the Palestinians into a corner of the chessboard where there's no longer any choice. If we agree on a two-state solution, we are offered bantustans. And if we say that in those conditions, we'd prefer a single, bi-national state, then we are accused of wanting to destroy Israel."

In a 2012 interview, Barghouti said he was convinced the peace process was "dead" as a result of settlement expansion and a lack of political will. In a March 2013 interview, he said that the peace process was "frozen with no prospects of peace on the horizon," with "an unprecedented increase in Israeli settlements and land takeover throttling the idea of a Palestinian state." He also lamented "the intolerable economic situation," the "internal division between Fatah and Hamas," and "the humiliation that Palestinians are experiencing at the hands of settlers and also in encounters with Israelis inside Israel." Yet he said that he was given "great hope" by "the growing movement amongst people for non-violent resistance".

=== Boycott issue ===
Barghouti discusses his views on Boycott, Divestment, and Sanctions (BDS), non-violent resistance, and apartheid in 2016 during a protest in Ramallah

Barghouti claimed in 2005 that the PNI did not support a boycott of Israel, while adding that it did call for sanctions against Israel, including "suspension of the EU–Israel accords...; stopping all military co-operation with Israel...; a halt to investment in Israel; [and] cutting off cultural relations at government level." In 2012, the PNI's website reported that the group had "recently launched a new campaign, aiming to boycott Israeli products in West Bank supermarkets." Barghouti had led a group of protesters at a supermarket in the Atira district of in Ramallah, and said that "Shopkeepers are being great. We are convincing them to take away Israeli products and put Palestinian goods [in their place]."

In a 2012 interview, Barghouti affirmed his support for a multi-prong strategy to end the Israeli occupation of the West Bank. "Popular resistance," he said, "is a successful formula because it works both in the case of two states or one. In my opinion, the strategic choice before us is made up of four elements: the escalation of popular resistance, the BDS campaign, revamping all domestic and Palestinian economic policies to focus them on reinforcing the people's steadfastness instead of drowning them in debts, taxes and consumerism, rejecting the distinction between Areas A, B and C, and fourthly, national unity."

== Personal life ==
Barghouti is married to Rita Giacaman, professor of public health at the Institute of Community and Public Health at Birzeit University. His daughter, Dia Barghouti, is a doctoral candidate at the University of London.

In January 2024, during an interview, TalkTV broadcaster Julia Hartley-Brewer yelled at Barghouti and suggested that he was uncomfortable listening to women speak, leading to over 17,000 complaints to British Office of Communications (Ofcom). The incident was the most complained-about United Kingdom program in 2024. In response to the incident, during an interview with Nigeria Info, Barghouti addressed Hartley's accusation by pointing to his long history of defending women's rights and accusing Hartley-Brewer of racism. Barghouti explained that, "all that she had to do was Google me, or look at [who my wife is], to realize how silly her accusation was. Because, ... all my life, I have been one of the biggest advocates ... for women's rights in Palestine and in the Arab World. ... My wife is [one of] the most published researchers in Palestine. She's a community leader, she founded the community health department in Birzeit University, she's a professor ... and my daughter is a strong advocate of women's rights." He added, "I mean, how could [Hartley-Brewer] say that I can not listen to women when I have all these people with me?"

Barghouti is a distant cousin of Marwan Barghouti, the former Secretary General of Fatah in the West Bank and proponent of the peace process who, in 2002, was imprisoned by Israel for his alleged role in deadly attacks.

Political offices
Preceded by Yousef Rizqa	Minister of Information; 2007	Succeeded by Riyad al-Maliki
Party political offices
New political party	Secretary General of the Palestinian National Initiative; 2002–present	Incumbent
