= Arab Thought Forum =

Palestinian civil society organization

The Arab Thought Forum (Arabic: ملتقى الفكر العربي; also known as Al-Multaqa) was a Palestinian civil society organization active in the fields of politics, development, and the arts.

== Background ==
Arab Thought Forum was founded in Jerusalem in 1977 and was closely affiliated with the National Guidance Committee; it was also generally considered supportive of the PLO.

The Forum aimed to "resist relations of dependence imposed by Israel on the Palestinian economy." It also sponsored one of the first literature festivals in the West Bank. In later years, its areas of focus have been described as including "the future of Jerusalem, democratization and nation building, and development."

Leading figures in the original formation of the Forum included Mahdi Abd al Hadi and Ibrahim Dakkak. Haydar Abd Al Shafi was another prominent member.
