= Rita Giacaman =

- ريتا جقمان
- Born: 1950 (age 75–76); Bethlehem
- Education: University of California, San Francisco (PharmD); University of Essex (MPhil)
- Employer: Birzeit University
- Spouse: Mustafa Barghouti
- Children: 1

Rita H. Giacaman (Arabic: ريتا جقمان; born 1950) is an Emeritus Professor of public health at Birzeit University's Institute of Community and Public Health (ICPH). Since the 1970s, she has studied Palestinian public health under Israeli occupation, women's health and mental health. She has received a number of accolades for her work, including an honorary doctorates from the London School of Economics and King's College London.

== Early life and education ==
Giacaman was born to a Christian family in Bethlehem. She graduated with a PharmD in Clinical Health from the University of California, San Francisco in 1977 and a Master of Philosophy (MPhil) in Sociology/Social Policy from the University of Essex in 1984.

== Career ==
After completing her PharmD, Giacaman briefly worked as a clinician and tutor at the Presbyterian Hospital Medical Centre in San Francisco before returning to the West Bank in 1978, where she became Assistant Professor in the Department of Biology at Birzeit University. That year, an informal Palestinian public health research collective, of which Giacaman was a "driving force", was founded. Traveling around the West Bank, Giacaman and her colleagues sought to investigate the "social, political and material conditions [that] determine health and life expectancy". This collective became an official university department in 1982 and was upgraded in 1998 to the Institute of Community and Public Health (ICPH).

Giacaman's book Life and health in three Palestinian villages was published in 1988.

After her MPhil, Giacaman was a founding member of Birzeit's Community Health Department, becoming its Director in 1988, and Program of Women’s Studies.

Amid the Second Intifada, the ICPH found young Palestinians' quality of life was the lowest in the world, which Giacaman described as a "social disorder", saying "We know that exposure to violent incidents and persistent harassment has a major impact on health… anxiety, disturbing emotions, insecurity, harassment – all of these have a negative effect on people throughout their lives and cause illness".

Giacaman was awarded an honorary PhD from the London School of Economics in 2011.

In 2019, Giacaman was awarded an honorary Doctor of Science from King's College London. She was also the Society for Research on Adolescence's 2018 International Fellowship Program (IFP) recipient.

Birzeit University recognised Giacaman with a Lifetime Achievement and Excellence Award in 2026.

== Personal life ==
Giacaman is married to Mustafa Barghouti. Their daughter is Dia Barghouti.

== Select publication ==
=== Books ===
- Life and Health in Three Palestinian Villages (1988)
- Geriatrics in Perspective: A Review of Geriatric Services in the West Bank (1991) with Kate Lock and Hala Salem
- Psychosocial/Mental Health Care in the Occupied Palestinian Territories: the Embryonic System (2004)
