= Haidar Abdel-Shafi =

Palestinian activist (1919–2007)

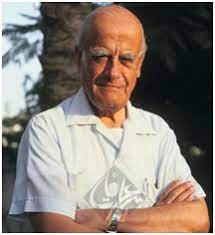

Member of the Palestinian Legislative Council for Gaza Governorate
- In office 7 March 1996 – 30 March 1998

Head of the Palestinian Delegation to the Madrid Conference
- In office 30 October 1991 – 1 November 1991

Personal details
- Born: 10 June 1919 Gaza City, British-administered Palestine
- Died: 25 September 2007 (aged 88) Gaza City, Palestine
- Party: Arab Nationalist Movement
- Spouse: Hoda Khalidi
- Education: American University of Beirut College of Medicine
- Occupation: Physician, community leader, political leader

Haidar Abdel-Shafi (Heidar Abdul-Shafi) (Arabic: حيدر عبد الشافي 10 June 1919 – 25 September 2007) was a Palestinian physician, community leader and political leader. He was the head of the Palestinian delegation to the Madrid Conference of 1991 and served in the Palestinian Legislative Council for Gaza Governorate from 1996 to 1998.

== Background ==
Abdel-Shafi was born in Gaza, one of six children of Sheikh Muheiddin Abdel-Shafi, head of the Higher Islamic Council Waqf and custodian of the holy places in Gaza and Hebron (from 1925 to 1927). He attended primary school in Gaza; secondary education as a boarder at the Arab College in Jerusalem and graduated in 1936. He graduated in 1943 from the American University of Beirut College of Medicine in Beirut. At the university, he joined George Habash's Arab Nationalist Movement dedicated to Arab nationalism and the "liberation of Palestine".

== Political and community service career ==
=== Pre-1948 ===
Abdel-Shafi worked at the British Mandate of Palestine's Municipal Hospital in Jaffa. In 1944-1945 he joined the Desert Army of the British Jordanian Army, then part of a new British Ninth Army intended to open a second front - which never materialized - in the Balkans. Spent the war instead in various locations in Palestine: Al-Azraq, Ashona, Jericho, Gaza, and resigned his commission at the war's end. He returned to Gaza and entered private medical practice. He then co-founded a branch of the Palestine Medical Society in 1945, and participated in the first Palestine Medical Congress in 1946.

In 1947 and during the Arab-Israeli clashes following the UN partition plan, he provided medical support for the Palestinian fighters. During the 1948 Arab–Israeli War, he ran a clinic in Gaza to serve the refugees who flooded into Gaza in large numbers. During this period he worked closely with the Quakers, who provided humanitarian relief for the refugees until UNRWA was established in 1951.

=== 1948–1967 ===
In 1951 he began his studying medicine at Miami Valley Hospital in Dayton, Ohio. He returned to Gaza in 1954, by which time it was under Egyptian rule. He worked as a surgeon at the Tal Zahur Hospital. In 1956, as the Gaza Strip came under the control of Israel, a municipal council with Abdel-Shafi as one of its ten (10) members was installed.

In 1957 Dr. Abdel-Shafi married Hoda Khalidi, from a prominent Jerusalemite family. 1948. Dr. Abdel-Shafi was appointed as Head of medical services in the Gaza Strip from 1957 until 1960. During this period, he became a strong admirer and personal friend of Gamal Abdel Nasser. In 1960, he returned to his private medical practice.

He held a two-year term as chairman of the first Palestinian Legislative Council in Gaza beginning in 1962. He was also a delegate to the first all-Palestinian conference (Palestinian National Council) which convened in Jerusalem in 1964 and helped establish the Palestine Liberation Organization (PLO). He served as a member of the first PLO-Executive Committee (1964–1965). By 1966 he was a leading PLO figure in the Gaza Strip.

=== 1967–1991 ===
In June 1967, Israel controlled Gaza after the Six-Day War. During and shortly after the war, Dr. Abdel-Shafi volunteered at al-Shifa Hospital in Gaza. He was later temporarily detained by Israel, suspected of support for the military activities of George Habash's new guerilla faction, the Popular Front for the Liberation of Palestine (PFLP), an offshoot of the Arab Nationalist Movement. Abdel-Shafi denied membership, but expressed his sympathy for the group's goals.

Upon his release, he refused all co-operation with Israel's plans to tie Gaza to Israel through the development of a common infrastructure. Moshe Dayan expelled him for three months to the isolated Sinai village of Nekhl in 1969. Deported again on September 12, 1970, this time to Lebanon for two months, along with five other prominent members of the Gazan leadership, in retaliation for a PFLP hijacking.

He was the founder and director of the Palestinian Red Crescent Society in the Gaza Strip in 1972, his own rallying organisation for Palestinian improvement. He was attacked by Islamists, who, in 1981 burned down his clinic. He was also a founding member in the late 1970s of the National Guidance Committee of Palestine.

During the First Intifada in May 1988 he was one of three Palestinians (the others were Saeb Erekat and Hanan Ashrawi) to participate in Nightline's Town Hall meeting from Jerusalem. It was the first time that Palestinians and high ranking PLO members had directly addressed Israeli and Western audiences.

=== The Madrid Conference and after ===
In 1991, he led the Palestinian delegation to the Madrid Peace Conference and subsequently led the Palestinian negotiation team for 22 months in the Washington talks (1992–93). He broke with the Palestinian negotiating team over the Oslo peace agreement over the question of the Israeli settlements. He was one of the first to predict that the Oslo process would collapse because it failed to tackle the issue of settlements.

In 1996, he was elected to the Palestinian Legislative Council (PLC) with the highest number of votes as member for Gaza. He took up leadership of the PLC's political committee. He resigned as a deputy in the PLC in late 1997 to protest what he described at the time as the failure to deal with corruption in the Palestinian Authority. Two years later he initiated unity talks for all factions in Gaza. Following the outbreak of the second Intifada, he urged the Palestinian Authority (PA) to organize the Intifada rather than distance itself from it, and to widen its democratic base by forming a government of national unity.

He co-founded the Palestinian National Initiative in 2002 along with Edward Said, Mustafa Barghouti and Ibrahim Dakkak as a national platform for combining the struggle for national liberation and the return of refugees with the values of national unity, democracy and social justice.

On April 8, 2007, he was presented with the Palestinian Star of Honor by President Mahmoud Abbas largely for his role as founding member and President of the Palestinian National Initiative.

He died from cancer in Gaza aged 88. His funeral rally was attended by various political factions in Gaza in a rare show of unity. He is survived by his wife, four children (Hind, Khaled, Tareq, Salah) and seven grandchildren.
