= Hamed al-Jubouri =

Iraqi politician and diplomat (1932–2017)

Hamed Alwan Al-Jubouri
- حامد علوان الجبوري
- Born: March, 1932; Hillah, Babylon Governorate, Kingdom of Iraq
- Died: December 18, 2017 (aged 85); London, United Kingdom
- Education: American University of Beirut
- Occupations: Minister of Information and Culture, Minister of Youth and Sports, Foreign Minister and Diplomat
- Years active: 1948-1993
- Known for: One of the founders of the Arab Nationalist Movement
- Political party: Ba'ath Party (1948-1966), Arab Nationalist Movement (1951-1970), Iraqi Ba'ath Party (1966-1993)

Hamed Alwan Al-Jubouri (March 1932 – 18 December 2017) was an Iraqi politician, foreign minister and diplomat. He is considered to be one of the main founders of the Arab Nationalist Movement.

== Early life ==
Al-Jubouri was born in an area near the city of Hillah in Babylon Governorate in Iraq in March 1932. He finished high school in Baghdad in 1948, then traveled to Lebanon to study at the American University of Beirut and studied political science. In that same year, he had joined the Ba'ath Party, until he left after the 1949 Syrian Coup. In 1951, he founded the Arab Nationalist Movement with George Habash. Al-Jubouri graduated on 1952 and returned a year later to Iraq.

== Political career ==
After returning to Iraq, Al-Jubouri continued as a founding member of the Arab Nationalist Movement. In December 1958, he was arrested for the first time under the regime of Abdul-Karim Qasim on charges related to conspiring against the authority. During his time in prison, he met with many leaders of the Ba'ath Party, this time led by Ahmed Hassan al-Bakr. Al-Jubouri was released from prison in August 1961, until returning there again, where he remained there until mid-1962.

In July 1967, he met with Saddam Hussein for the first time and participated in the orchestration of the 14 July Revolution that brought the Ba'ath Party to power.

On 31 July 1968, he was appointed as the Minister of Presidential Affairs, and Director of the Office of President Ahmed Hassan Bakr, and in 1969, he became Minister of Information and Culture until 1971, and then Minister of Youth and Sports until 1972. On mid-1973, he returned again as Minister of Information and Culture until mid-June 1974, during which time he was elected President of the General Union of Iraqi Youth.

On 1975, he became Minister of State, where he was tasked until 1977 with coordinating between the central authority and the institutions of the autonomous region of the Kurdistan Region of Iraq, then in the same year he served as Minister of State in charge of managing the office of the "Secretary" of the Deputy Chairman of the Revolutionary Command Council, then he was appointed Minister of State for Foreign Affairs and remained in his position until September 1984, when he was relieved by a presidential decree by President Saddam Hussein.

On 1986, he was appointed Iraq's ambassador to Switzerland until 1989, then Iraq's permanent representative to the Arab League and Iraq's ambassador to Tunisia and the Palestine Liberation Organization.

During his ministerial tenure, he served as the acting minister of foreign affairs, interior, health, housing, labor, education, and scientific research, and the head of the office of the presidency of the Iraqi Republic.

== Defection and later life ==
On 1 August 1993, Al-Jubouri announced his defection from Saddam Hussein's government at a press conference held in London. Iraqis loyal to Saddam Hussein's government accused him of stealing and embezzling embassy funds and expenses before defecting.

Al-Jubouri recorded several TV episodes of the program "Witness to the Age", which is shown on the Al-Jazeera channel and presented by the Egyptian journalist Ahmed Mansour. Al-Jubouri talked about the situation of the Iraqi state and the way the country was run during those stages when he was occupying part of the power.

== Death ==
Al-Jubouri died on 18 December 2017 in London.
