= Mahdi Abdul Hadi =

Palestinian lawyer and political scientist (born 1944)

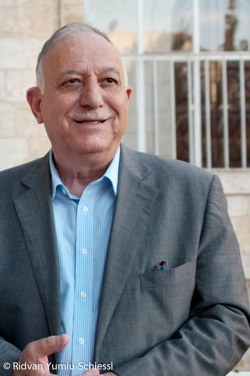
Mahdi Abdul Hadi

Mahdi Abdul Hadi (22 March 1944- 15 January 2025) was a political scientist, historian, columnist, author, founder and member of various Palestinian, Arab and international institutions. He founded and heads the Palestinian Academic Society for the Study of International Affairs.

Abdul Hadi was born in Nablus but has spent most of his life in Jerusalem. He holds a Ph.D. from the School of Peace Studies at the University of Bradford in the United Kingdom. He has devoted most of his life to academic research and dialogue, as well as the publication of this research with the aim of providing a deep understanding of Palestinian issues, past and present – the land, the people, their rights and their leadership – to interested audiences. He has founded and co-founded forums and institutes. For example, he co-founded the Al-Fajr Palestinian daily newspaper in 1972 as well as the Palestinian Council for Higher Education (1977–1980).

== Family ==
Abdul Hadi's family roots can be traced back to the seventh century when – according to one theory – the Abdul Hadi family, then an Arab tribe from Yemen, came to Jerusalem. Later, the family used to govern the area of Nablus and Acre and was widely known as landlords. Until today they own large areas of property around Nablus and Jenin. During the Ottoman rule over Palestine, members of the Abdul Hadi family were not only active in government positions but also in opposition movements.

== Early life ==
Abdul Hadi was born in Nablus on 22 March 1944 and spent most of his early childhood in Jaffa, where his father, Fouad Abdul Hadi, was a landlord in Mandatory Palestine (the Arabian Triangle – Khidara). During the 1948 Arab-Israeli War, the family became refugees in Lebanon. Together with his two brothers, Abdul Hadi and Salameh, Mahdi Abdul Hadi joined the Jesuit St. Joseph School in Junieh, Beirut. He was taught in Beirut upon the family's return to Nablus in 1950, under Jordanian rule, where his father worked as a judge in the district court, which had by then become part of the Jordanian Ministry of Justice.

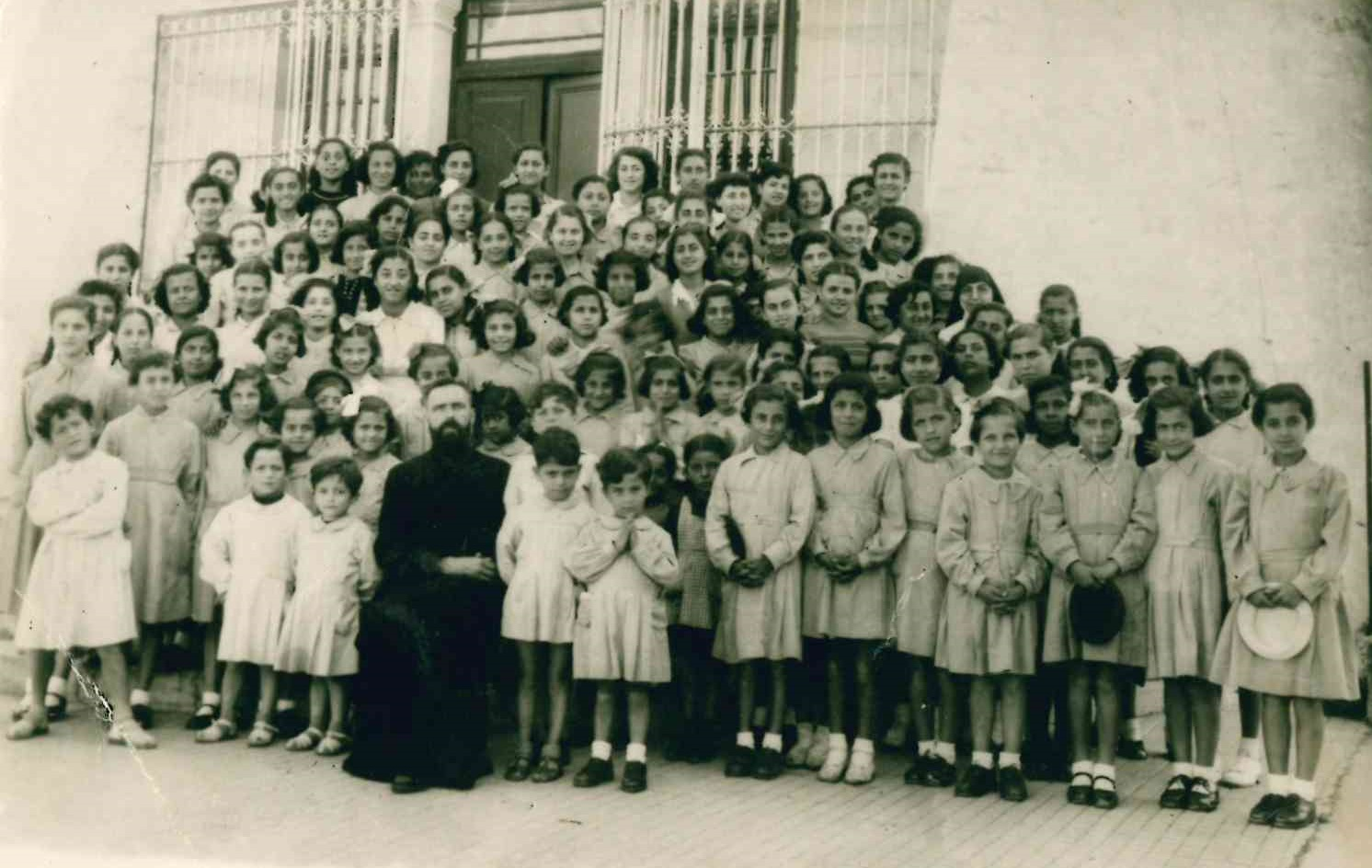
The Abdul Hadi Brothers as Refugees at the Jounieh Jesuit School, Beirut (1949)

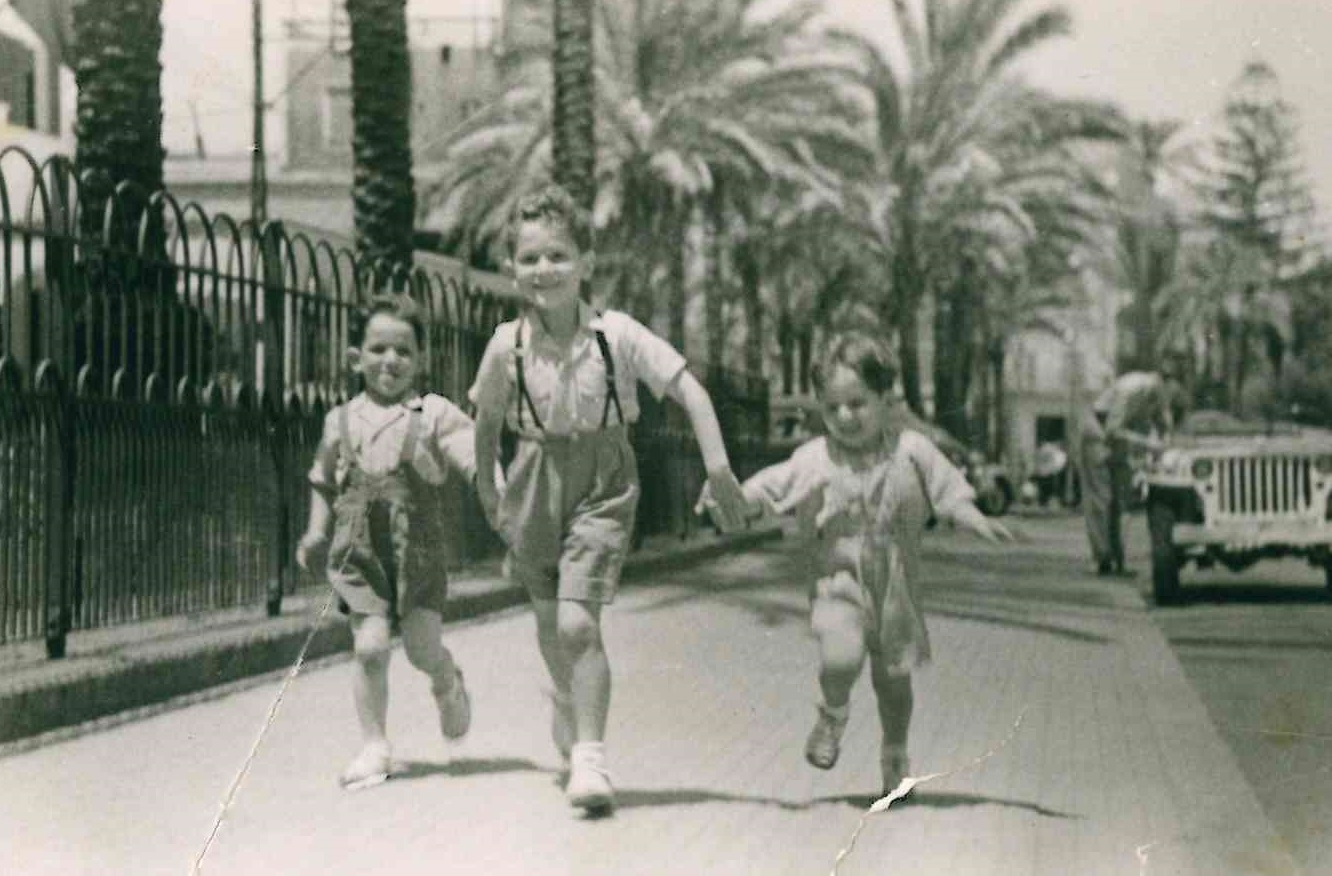
The three Abdul-Hadi Brothers in Beirut (12 July 1949)

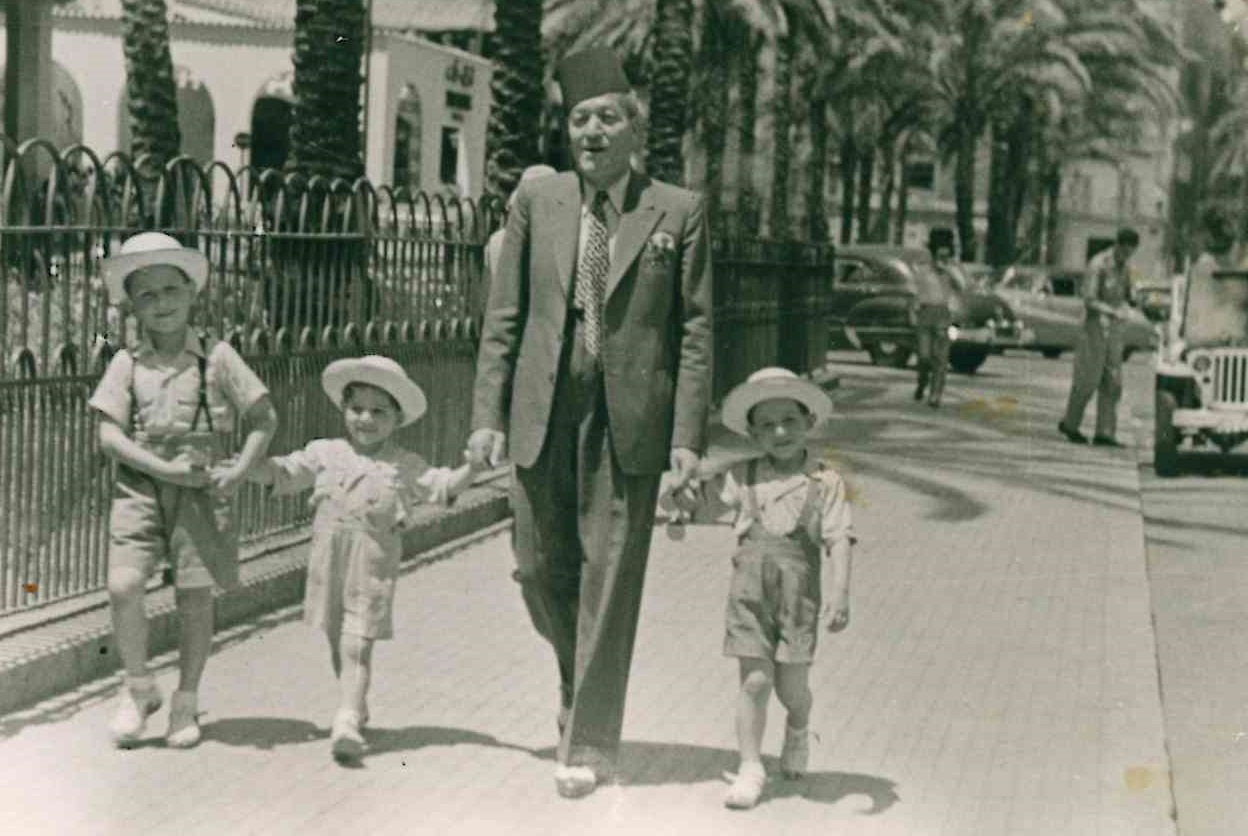
The Abdul-Hadi Brothers (Abed, Salameh, Mahdi) with their Father, Fouad Abdul-Hadi, Beirut, June 1949

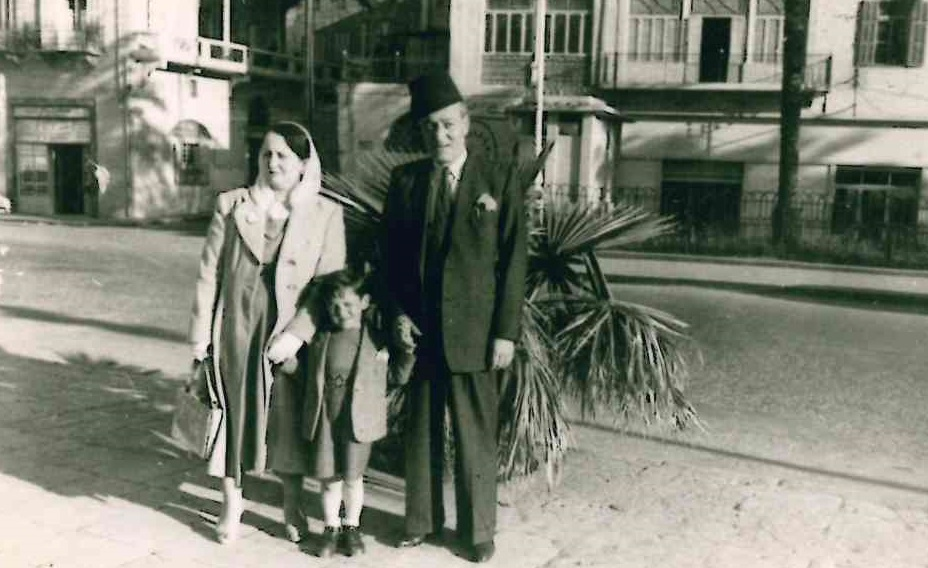
Dr Mahdi Abdul Hadi with his parents Fouad Abdul Hadi and Shahira Nabulsi in Beirut 1949-05-15

== Education ==
In the following decade, Abdul Hadi received his primary and secondary education at various institutions in the West Bank, such as the national Najah School (1950–1952), Ahliya School (1952–1955), the Ibn Rushd School in Hebron (1955–1957), the German Schneller School in Bethlehem (1958), the Friends Boys School in Ramallah (1959–1960), the Khalil Sakakani School in Jerusalem (1961–1962) and the Rashidiya School (1962–1963). He completed his secondary education (Tawjihi) in Cairo, Egypt, at the National Educational School Zamalek in Cairo (1964).

Afterwards, he enrolled at a law school in Damascus, Syria, which he completed with a bachelor's degree in Law (1965–1970). During the time of his studies, he worked as a clerk in the district court in Jerusalem under the judges Tayseer Kan’an and Fahad Abu al-Atham until Jerusalem was occupied by the Israeli army during the Six-Day War in June 1967. Subsequently, he joined the general strike by Arab lawyers protesting against the Israeli occupation.

== Career ==
After studying law at Damascus University, he started his career as a lawyer continuing the family tradition. However, he moved into the realm of mass media and established, along with Yousef Nasri Naser and Jamil Hamad, Al-Fajr (the dawn) newspaper (1972). He worked as an editor for Al-Fajr and published a number of articles and editorials under an alias. After the kidnapping of Naser in 1972, Abdul Hadi published his first book, The Question of Palestine and Peaceful Solutions, which focused on debates, initiatives and ideas on a settlement of the conflict between the Israelis and Palestinians in the period of 1934 to 1974, which was published in Lebanon.

In 1977, Abdul Hadi founded the Arab Thought Forum, a Palestinian think-tank, which brought together a range of intellectuals, academics and politicians. Within the forum the group developed the idea of the National Guidance Committee and later also established it. Abdul Hadi was elected its President and functioned as such until 1980. In 1977 Abdul Hadi co-founded the Council for Higher Education in the West Bank and served as its elected Secretary General until 1980.

In 1981, he decided to continue his higher education and enrolled at the School of Peace Studies at Bradford University in the United Kingdom, from where he obtained his Ph.D. in 1984 focusing his dissertation on Palestinian-Jordanian relations during the period from 1921 until 1951. In order to even further broaden his grasp of global issues, he continued his education at the Harvard Center of International Affairs, where he stayed as a fellow for one year (1984–1985).

After becoming a special adviser of the Jordanian-Palestinian Joint Committee in Amman, Jordan, Abdul Hadi accepted the post of special adviser to the Ministry of Occupied Land Affairs (1985–1986). He used his post to publish a booklet on the affairs of the occupied territories for the Jordanian community. With the Jordanian deportation of the Palestine Liberation Organization (PLO) figure, Abu Jihad, and the continued crisis between the Jordanians and the Palestinians, among other reasons, Abdul Hadi resigned and returned to Jerusalem.

== Academics ==
Abdul Hadi participated in conferences, among them the Salzburg Seminar for Divided Cities - Berlin, Jerusalem, and Belfast in February 1987.

The same year, together with a group of Palestinian intellectuals and academics, Abdul Hadi founded the Palestinian Academic Society for the Study of International Affairs (PASSIA) in 1987, to provide a forum for the free debate and analysis of a plurality of local and foreign perspectives. PASSIA is involved in four main areas. As part of its Research and Publication Programme, PASSIA has published over 120 different studies on a diversity of subjects relevant to the Palestine question and the Palestinians, in addition to its annual diary. Another component is the Dialogue Programme, providing a venue for the presentation and discussion of a range of issues and viewpoints on matters of concern to Palestinians, with a focus on topical political events, interfaith issues and the question of Jerusalem. A third pillar of the work undertaken by PASSIA is its Training and Education Programme, which provides a platform for Palestinian practitioners and professionals to deepen their knowledge and expertise in specific areas of international affairs and institutional/personal capacity building.

Furthermore, Abdul Hadi has been involved in projects throughout the region and worldwide. In 1990, he established the Black Sea University Institute in Bucharest and was active as an external lecturer at Israeli and international universities, among them the Royal College of Defence Studies in Great Britain (1992–1997). His teachings focused on the Palestinian narrative and the Israeli-Palestinian conflict.

Together with Faisal Husseini, he co-founded the Jerusalem National Committee in 1992 which later became the Jerusalem Arab Council (1993), as Abdul Hadi functioned at the Orient House under Faisal Husseini’s leadership. Also, in 1995, he co-founded the EuroMeSCo Network and, together with Hedra Abdul Shafi and others, created the Palestinian Council for Peace and Justice. In 2000, he was part of the founders of the Arab Team for Muslim and Christian Dialogue in Beirut and one year later became a member of the Arab Thought Forum of Prince Hassan bin Talal in Jordan (2001).

In 2006, he was honored by King Albert II of Belgium with the title Commander of the Order of the Crown. Since 2009, Abdul Hadi has also been active as a member of the Board of Trustees of the Yasser Arafat Foundation and has contributed to statements, meetings and dialogues to end the Palestinian disengagement (since 2008). In 2011, he contributed to establishing the Arab Society for Development in Jerusalem. Furthermore, he was a member of the Palestinian independent personality team which worked towards Palestinian reconciliation and in 201, Abdul Hadi witnessed the official signing of the Cairo reconciliation document, or Palestinian Prisoners' Document as it is also known.

== Publications ==
Abdul Hadi has published articles, monographs, and essays and edited publications, including 100 Years of Palestinian History, A 20th Century Chronology (2001).

Some other publications include the following:

- Palestine: Social Impact of the Islamist-Secularist Struggle, Carnegie Endowment, September 2006.
- Sub-Regional Cooperation: The Case of the Middle East - A View from Palestine. Unpublished conference paper presented at a EuroMeSCO Working Group. Cairo: April 1999.
- Dialogue on Palestinian State-Building and Identity - PASSIA Meetings 1995–1998. Jerusalem: PASSIA, January 1999.
- Oslo: The Conflict, the Mediators and the Breakthrough. Conference paper presented at the Jeffrey Z. Rubin Memorial Conference of the Program on Negotiations, Harvard University. Massachusetts: October 1996.
- "Palestinian Security Concerns," in: Common Security in the Middle East, Research Group on European Affairs, conference paper, 1996.
- "The Future of Jerusalem - A Palestinian Perspective," in: Shu'un Tanmawiyyeh, Vol. 5, Nos. 2 & 3, Winter 1995/1996.
- Israeli Settlements in Occupied Jerusalem and the West Bank 1967–1977. Jerusalem: Arab Thought Forum, 1978.
- The Palestine Question and Peaceful Solutions 1934–1974. Saidun: Al-Assriya Publishing House, 1974
