= Madrid Conference of 1991 =

Israeli-Palestinian peace conference

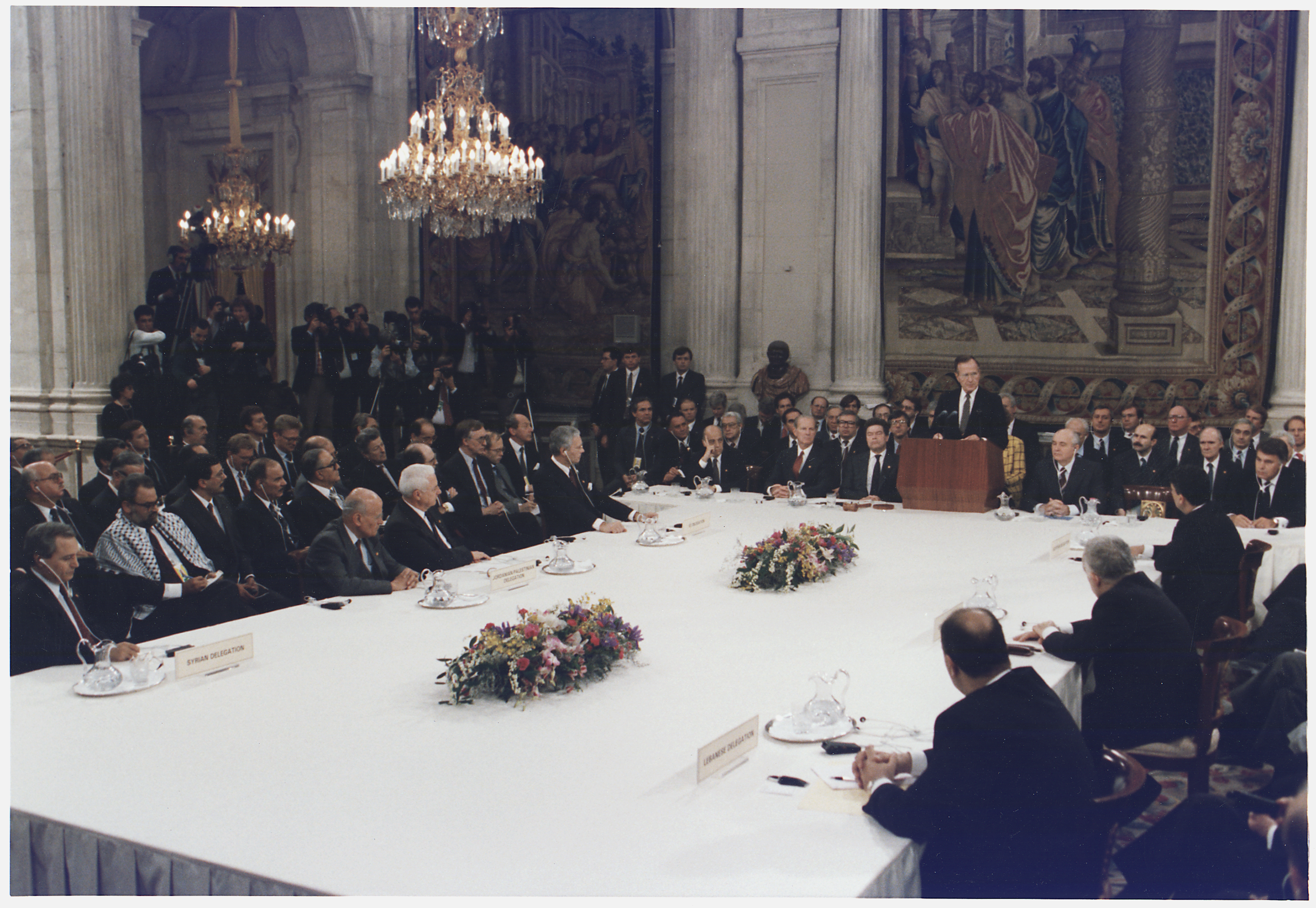
President George H. W. Bush addresses the Middle East Peace Conference at the Royal Palace in Madrid, Spain.

The Madrid Conference of 1991 was a peace conference, held from 30 October to 1 November 1991 in Madrid, hosted by Spain and co-sponsored by the Soviet Union and the United States. It was an attempt by the international community to revive the Israeli–Palestinian peace process through negotiations, involving Israel and the Palestinians as well as Arab countries, including Jordan, Lebanon, Syria, and Egypt.

On 3 November, the conference was followed by bilateral negotiations between Israel and respectively the joint Jordanian-Palestinian delegation, Lebanon and Syria. Subsequent bilateral meetings took place in Washington starting 9 December 1991. On 28 January 1992, multilateral negotiations about regional cooperation were started in Moscow, attended by Israel, the Jordanian-Palestinian delegation and the international community, but without Lebanon and Syria.

== Background ==
As early as 22 May 1989, U.S. Secretary of State James Baker stated to an AIPAC audience that Israel should abandon its expansionist policies; this remark was taken by many as a signal that the pro-Israel Reagan years were over. After the Gulf War on 6 March 1991, President George H. W. Bush addressed Congress in a speech often cited as the Bush administration's principal policy statement on the new order in the Middle East following the expulsion of Iraqi forces from Kuwait. In addition to maintaining a permanent U.S. naval presence in the Gulf, providing funds for Middle East development, and instituting safeguards against the spread of unconventional weapons, Michael Oren notes "The centerpiece of his program, however, was the achievement of an Arab-Israeli treaty based on the territory-for-peace principle and the fulfillment of Palestinian rights."

== Preparations ==
As a first step, Bush announced his intention to reconvene the international peace conference in Madrid. The Bush administration believed there was a window of opportunity to use the political capital generated by the U.S. victory in the Gulf War to revitalize the Arab-Israeli peace process. This peace initiative focused on convening a multi-party international conference that would then break into separate, bilateral and multilateral negotiating tracks. U.S. secretary of state James Baker made eight diplomatic visits to the region to get support for the conference. A framework of objectives was formulated and the U.S., together with the Soviet Union, extended a letter of invitation, dated 30 October 1991 to Israel, Syria, Lebanon, Jordan, and the Palestinians.

=== Loan guarantees and the settlements issue ===
Although "check-book diplomacy" had been used in the past to move the peace process, as at the Camp David Accords, President Bush and Secretary Baker felt the coalition victory and increased U.S. prestige would itself induce a new Arab-Israeli dialogue, but also because their diplomatic initiative focused on process and procedure rather than on specific agreements and concessions. From Washington's perspective, economic inducements would not be necessary, but in May, these entered the process with Israeli prime minister Yitzhak Shamir's request for $11 billion in U.S. loan guarantees, to help absorb immigrants on humanitarian grounds. This request however, added a new dimension to U.S. diplomacy and sparked a political showdown between Shamir's Likud government and the Bush administration.

Secretary Baker made frequent shuttle trips to the region between March and October 1991 in an attempt to find a procedural formula acceptable to all sides. He did not have an easy time finding the right formula to convene the conference, particularly on the issue of Palestinian representation. In light of Shamir's pro-settlement policy, Palestinians and many Arab governments viewed the request for Israeli loan guarantees as a test of America's credibility as mediator. In addition to Arab opposition, the Bush administration had its own problems with the request, because there was residual ill-will following Israel's refusal to verify whether the previous (October 1990) $400 million loan guarantee was used for settlement expansion; the administration did not see populating settlements as a humanitarian issue.

Throughout the run-up to the Madrid conference, Israel's loan guarantee request remained a sore point. By early September 1991, the Administration asked Congress for a 120-day delay on the loan guarantees. This postponement was seen as a way to get to Madrid, to buy time, and to soften the domestic debate. If a settlement freeze could not be obtained from Israel, Bush and Baker wanted the issue off the agenda. "[The United States] must do everything we can to give peace a chance," Bush said in requesting the delay from Congress. Israeli leaders opposed linking the loans to the political process; Shamir and the pro-Israel lobby in Washington decided to push forward with their request despite Bush's opposition. Israel and its supporters in Washington began a campaign to support the loan request, but Bush, with a 70 percent job approval rating, would not back down. By mid-September, U.S.–Israel relations were tense; pro-Israel groups challenged the president and lobbied against the delay. Shamir had originally believed he could outflank Bush and Baker and turn to U.S. public opinion and the pro-Israel lobby. However, the U.S. Jewish community – though visibly mobilized on this issue – was not united in taking on the Administration, and Shamir soon backed away from a direct confrontation. With Bush's approval ratings high, and his unambiguous show of determination and will, he gained congressional support for the delay; following that, the diplomatic pieces soon fell into place and the parties convened in Madrid at the end of October.

== Conference ==
The Palestinian team was part of a joint Palestinian-Jordanian delegation and consisted of Palestinians from the West Bank and Gaza. It was formally without overt PLO associates like Saeb Erekat and Haidar Abdel-Shafi, the head of the delegation, because of Israeli objections. Before the conference, Israel had threatened not to come if PLO representatives, or someone from outside the Gaza Strip and the West Bank, or someone from East Jerusalem would be part of the Palestinian delegation. The delegation was in constant communication with the PLO leadership in Tunis. Over Israeli objections, the PLO dispatched an unofficial "advisory delegation", headed by Faisal Husseini, to act as a liaison. During the conference, PLO figures were present backstage to instruct the Palestinian delegation.

The purpose of the conference was to serve as an opening forum for the participants and had no power to impose solutions or veto agreements. It inaugurated negotiations on both bilateral and multilateral tracks that also involved the international community. The Syrian and Lebanese negotiators agreed on a common strategy.

It was the last conference held with both the Soviet Union and U.S. present; the Soviet Union collapsed later that year in December.

== Following bilateral and multilateral negotiations ==
The Madrid Conference was followed by two parallel tracks of negotiations. The bilateral track was aimed at achieving peace treaties between Israel and its three neighbor states Jordan, Lebanon and Syria as well as with the Palestinians. The multilateral track was about the shared regional issues water, environment, arms control, refugees and economic development.

=== Bilateral negotiations ===
Four separate sets of bilateral negotiations started on 3 November 1991, right after the formal conference ended. Twelve meetings in Washington followed. The first one on 9 December 1991; the last one on 24 January 1994, four months after the conclusion of the Oslo I Accord.

The bilateral Israeli-Palestinian negotiations did not go well under the Shamir government. The Madrid negotiations were later upstaged and eventually replaced by, initially secret, negotiations following the 1992 Israeli election, during which Rabin and Labor pledged to end Shamir's settlement policy and reformulate national priorities.

=== Multilateral negotiations ===
The multilateral negotiations were scheduled two weeks after the opening of the conference, but the first meeting in Moscow took place only on 28–29 January 1992. The meetings were held in five separate forums each focusing on a major issue – water, environment, arms control, refugees or economic development. The European Union took part in the meetings.

The meetings took place between September 1992 and November 1993. The first round took place in May 1992. Israel boycotted the groups on refugees and economic development because Palestinians from outside the West Bank and Gaza were present. Syria and Lebanon refused to take part in multilateral meetings as long as there was no concrete progress on the bilateral level.

Formal talks in the multilateral track, which had been frozen for several years, resumed on 31 January 2000, with a meeting of the Steering Committee in Moscow, to be followed by meetings of the working groups. After this round, however, the formal talks were stalled.

==== Arms Control and Regional Security ====
The Arms Control and Regional Security (ACRS) working group was one of the multilateral tracks established under the Madrid Conference framework to address broader regional issues beyond bilateral peace talks. Designed to foster dialogue and mutual recognition between Israel and the wider Arab world, ACRS reflected a growing interest in regional arms control and nonproliferation.

Early in the ACRS process, Egypt pushed to place Israel’s nuclear policy on the agenda, arguing that genuine progress in regional security required addressing Israel’s undeclared nuclear capability. Israel rejected this, maintaining that such discussions could only follow advances in regional peace and confidence-building measures. This disagreement led to an impasse, and by early 1995, the ACRS track had stalled.

== Impact of the Madrid Peace Conference ==
In the negotiations leading to Madrid, Israel made revocation of UN Resolution 3379 a condition of its participation in the conference; this was accomplished shortly thereafter, with the passage of Resolution 46/86, on 16 December 1991. Israel also cites, as a major benefit of the conference and the peace process, the greatly increased number of countries which recognize and have some degree of diplomatic relations with it – nearly doubling – in particular citing the major powers of China and India and some even in the Arab world, like Oman, Qatar, Tunisia, Morocco and Mauritania, along with the decline of the Arab boycott and economic relations with some of the Arab countries.

In The Palestine-Israel Conflict: A Basic Introduction, Gregory Harms and Todd Ferry argue that 'the symbolic significance of the Madrid conference far outweighed its accomplishments, which were thin indeed.' Nevertheless, an example had been made and a future model had been laid down, as the Madrid conference represents the first time all these countries had been gathered "face-to-face".

At the end of the Madrid conference all participating countries appeared hopeful that the conference had resulted in a future road-map for reconciliation. The closing remarks presented below illustrate this hopeful sentiment:

Israeli Prime Minister Yitzhak Shamir, 1 November 1991
"With an open heart, we call on the Arab leaders to take the courageous step and respond to our outstretched hand in peace"

Head of the Palestinian Delegation, Haydar Abd al-Shafi, 1 November 1991
"To the cosponsors and to the international community that seeks the achievement of a just peace in the Middle East, you have given us a fair hearing. You cared enough to listen and for that we thank you. Thank you."

The bilateral Israeli–Palestinian negotiations eventually led to the exchange of letters and the subsequent signing of the Oslo I Accord, on the lawn of the White House on 13 September 1993. The Israel–Jordan negotiations that emanated from the Madrid conference, led to a peace treaty in 1994. The Israeli–Syrian negotiations included series of follow-on meetings, which according to some reports, came quite close, but failed to result in a peace treaty.

== See also ==
- UN General Assembly Resolution 43/176
- List of Soviet Union–United States summits (1943 to 1991)
- List of Middle East peace proposals
