= United Nations General Assembly Resolution 43/177 =

United Nations General Assembly resolution adopted in 1988

The United Nations General Assembly Resolution 43/177 of 15 December 1988 was a resolution in which the United Nations General Assembly acknowledged the proclamation of the State of Palestine and the use of the designation "Palestine", referring to the PLO in the UN. Further, the Assembly affirmed the need for sovereignty by the Palestinian people over their territory occupied in 1967 by Israel. The resolution is titled "43/177. Question of Palestine".

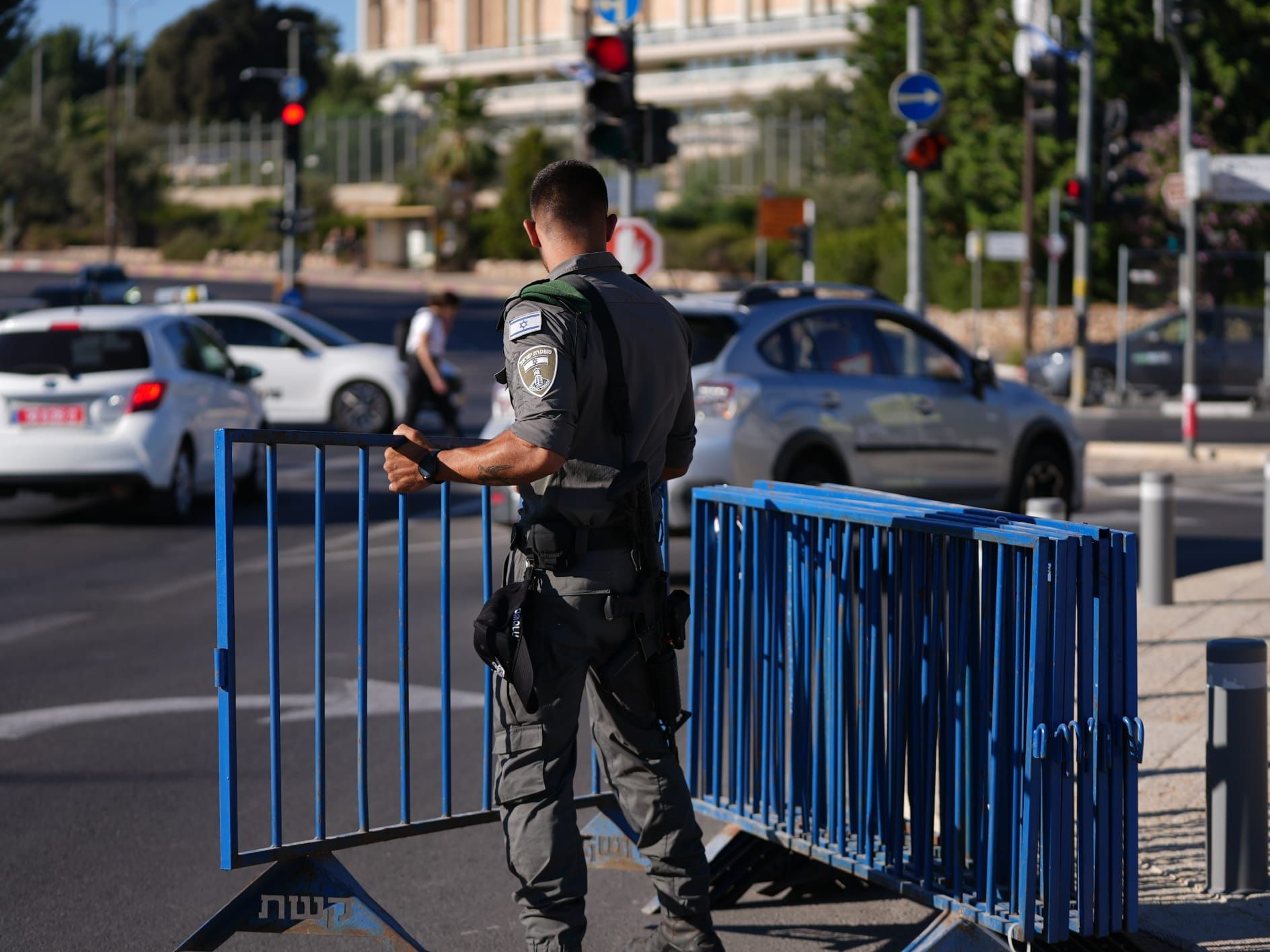
Border police in Jerusalem

The resolution recalls Resolution 181, which called for the establishment of both an Arab and a Jewish state. It also expresses a connection between the proclamation of the State of Palestine, Resolution 181 and the rights of the Palestinians.

In effect, this was the International recognition of the State of Palestine, although still occupied and not yet admitted as member of the UN. Shortly after the resolution, about 100 states had officially recognized Palestine, many via the UN.

In the same meeting Resolution 43/176 was adopted, in which was called on an International Peace Conference and principles were affirmed for the achievement of comprehensive peace. Only Israel and the United States opposed a Peace Conference, while insisting on bilateral negotiations instead. The resolutions 43/176 and 43/177 were broadly supported by NGO's all over the world.

== Text of Resolution 43/177 ==
The General Assembly,

Having considered the item entitled "Question of Palestine",

Recalling its resolution 181 (II) of 29 November 1947, in which, inter alia, it called for the establishment of an Arab State and a Jewish State in Palestine,

Mindful of the special responsibility of the United Nations to achieve a just solution to the question of Palestine,

Aware of the proclamation of the State of Palestine by the Palestine National Council in line with General Assembly resolution 181 (II) and in exercise of the inalienable rights of the Palestinian people,

Affirming the urgent need to achieve a just and comprehensive settlement in the Middle East which, inter alia, provides for peaceful coexistence for all States in the region,

Recalling its resolution 3237 (XXIX) of 22 November 1974 on the observer status for the Palestine Liberation Organization and subsequent relevant resolutions,

1. Acknowledges the proclamation of the State of Palestine by the Palestine National Council on 15 November 1988;

2. Affirms the need to enable the Palestinian people to exercise their sovereignty over their territory occupied since 1967;

3. Decides that, effective as of 15 December 1988, the designation "Palestine" should be used in place of the designation "Palestine Liberation Organization" in the United Nations system, without prejudice to the observer status and functions of the Palestine Liberation Organization within the United Nations system, in conformity with relevant United Nations resolutions and practice;

4. Requests the Secretary-General to take the necessary action to implement the present resolution.

== Votes ==
The resolution was adopted with 104 votes in favour and 36 abstentions. Israel and the United States were the only states that voted against the resolution.

== Background ==
The UN held meetings on "the question of Palestine" from 13 to 15 December 1988. The meetings were moved to Geneva, after the US refused to grant Yasser Arafat a visa. The US were strongly blamed for that. On 13 December, Arafat held a speech at the General Assembly. In a press conference on 14 December, he emphasized the PLO's endorsement of Resolution 181 as the basis for Palestinian independence and Resolutions 242 and 338 as the basis for negotiations with Israel within the framework of an international conference. Arafat also affirmed the PLO's position, that Israel has the right to exist in peace and security and the absolute renouncement of all forms of terrorism. On 15 December, the resolutions 43/175, 43/176 and 43/177 were adopted.

The political developments passed parallel with and were strongly influenced by the First Intifada, which began in December 1987.

== See also ==
- United Nations General Assembly resolution 67/19
