= United Nations General Assembly Resolution 43/176 =

The United Nations General Assembly Resolution 43/176 of 15 December 1988 was a resolution in which the General Assembly called for the convening of an International Peace Conference on the Middle East, under the auspices of the United Nations. The resolution is titled "43/176. Question of Palestine". The peace conference was proposed in the framework of international politics. The international community supported the International Peace Conference, with only Israel and the United States opposing it. Israel and US insisted on bilateral negotiations instead.

The resolution affirms principles for the achievement of comprehensive peace: withdrawal of Israel from the occupied Palestinian territories, including Jerusalem, and from the other occupied Arab territories; security of all States in the region, including those named in resolution 181, within secure and internationally recognized boundaries; execution of Resolution 194; dismantling of the Israeli settlements; and free access to Holy Places.

In the same meeting Resolution 43/177 was adopted, in which the proclamation of the State of Palestine was acknowledged and the occupied Palestinian territories were called territories over which the Palestinian people should exercise sovereignty. The resolutions 43/176 and 43/177 were broadly supported by NGO's all over the world.

Flag of Israel

Flag of Palestine

== Background ==
The UN held meetings on "the question of Palestine" from 13 to 15 December 1988. On 13 December, Yasser Arafat, chairman of the Palestine Liberation Organization, held a speech at the General Assembly. A month earlier he had declared the State of Palestine. An accompanying Political Communiqué urged an International Peace Conference. The Political Communiqué, in which the PLO affirmed its commitment to the UN and its resolutions and reaffirmed its rejection of terrorism in all its forms, drew much positive international attention. The Political Communiqué also included a proposal to place the occupied Palestinian territories temporarily under supervision of the UN, as noted in paragraph 4 of the resolution.

In a press conference on 14 December, Arafat emphasized the PLO's endorsement of Resolution 181 as the basis for Palestinian independence and Resolutions 242 and 338 as the basis for negotiations with Israel within the framework of an international conference. Arafat also affirmed the PLO's position, that Israel has the right to exist in peace and security and the absolute renouncement of all forms of terrorism.

Resolution 43/176 refers to Arafat's 13 December speech.

== Key elements of the resolution ==
Besides the call for an international peace conference, paragraph 3 affirms principles for the achievement of comprehensive peace:

- withdrawal of Israel from the occupied Palestinian territories, including Jerusalem, and from the other occupied Arab territories (that is the Golan Heights)
- security of all States in the region, including those named in resolution 181 (that is Israel and Palestine), within secure and internationally recognized boundaries
- execution of Resolution 194
- dismantling the Israeli settlements
- free access to Holy Places

== Text of Resolution 43/176 ==
The General Assembly,

Having considered the reports of the Secretary-General,

Having noted with appreciation the statement made on 13 December 1988 by the Chairman of the Palestine Liberation Organization,

Stressing that achieving peace in the Middle East would constitute a significant contribution to international peace and security,

Aware of the overwhelming support for the convening of the International Peace Conference on the Middle East,

Noting with appreciation the endeavours of the Secretary-General to achieve the convening of the Conference,

Welcoming the outcome of the nineteenth Extraordinary Session of the Palestine National Council as a positive contribution towards a peaceful settlement of the conflict in the region,

Aware of the ongoing uprising (intifadah) of the Palestinian people since 9 December 1987, aimed at ending Israeli occupation of Palestinian territory occupied since 1967,

1. Affirms the urgent need to achieve a just and comprehensive settlement of the Arab-Israeli conflict, the core of which is the question of Palestine;

2. Calls for the convening of the International Peace Conference on the Middle East, under the auspices of the United Nations, with the participation of all parties to the conflict, including the Palestine Liberation Organization, on an equal footing, and the five permanent members of the Security Council, based on Security Council resolutions 242 (1967) of 22 November 1967 and 338 (1973) of 22 October 1973 and the legitimate national rights of the Palestinian people, primarily the right to self-determination;

3. Affirms the following principles for the achievement of comprehensive peace:

(a) The withdrawal of Israel from the Palestinian territory occupied since 1967, including Jerusalem, and from the other occupied Arab territories;

(b) Guaranteeing arrangements for security of all States in the region, including those named in resolution 181 (II) of 29 November 1947, within secure and internationally recognized boundaries;

(c) Resolving the problem of the Palestine refugees in conformity with General Assembly resolution 194 (III) of 11 December 1948, and subsequent relevant resolutions;

(d) Dismantling the Israeli settlements in the territories occupied since 1967;

(e) Guaranteeing freedom of access to Holy Places, religious buildings and sites;

4. Notes the expressed desire and endeavours to place the Palestinian territory occupied since 1967, including Jerusalem, under the supervision of the United Nations for a limited period, as part of the peace process;

5. Requests the Security Council to consider measures needed to convene the International Peace Conference on the Middle East, including the establishment of a preparatory committee, and to consider guarantees for security measures agreed upon by the Conference for all States in the region;

6. Requests the Secretary-General to continue his efforts with the parties concerned, and in consultation with the Security Council, to facilitate the convening of the Conference, and to submit progress reports on developments in this matter.

== Votes ==
The resolution was adopted with 138 votes in favour and 2 abstentions. Israel and the United States were the only states that voted against the resolution.

== Israel's objections ==
Israel especially objected to paragraph 3, which affirms the principle of ending Israel's occupation, complete withdrawal and application of Resolution 194 regarding the Palestinian refugees. Israel also objected to the participation in the International Conference of the PLO, which was not acknowledged by Israel as the representative of the Palestinians, at the time. Israel argued that the conference would substitute, rather than support direct negotiations.
