= Johnny Mansour =

Israeli historian (born 1960)

Johnny Mansour جوني منصور
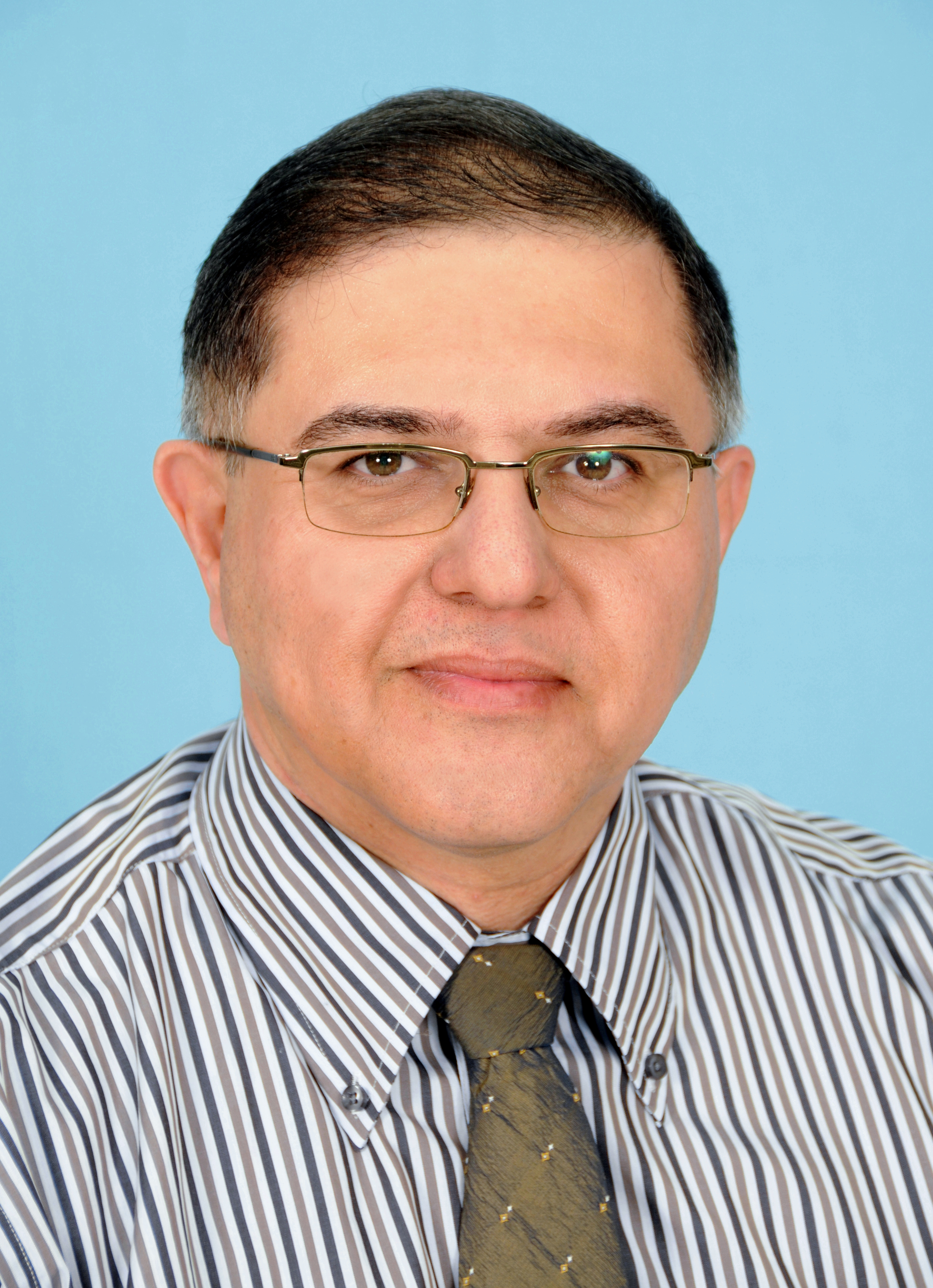

Historian

Personal details
- Born: 25 December 1960 (age 65) Haifa

Johnny Mansour (Arabic: جوني منصور; born December 25, 1960, Haifa, Israel) is an Israeli academic, author and historian at the Department of History Studies at the Academic College in Beit Berl. He specializes in the contemporary history of the Middle East and Israel, the Israeli-Palestinian conflict, and the history of Haifa.

== Career ==
Mansour was born in Haifa, Israel, in 1960. He studied Islam and Middle East history at Haifa University.

He completed his PhD at the University of Saint Petersburg (Saint Petersburg) in 1998 on the Medieval Muslim and Christian manuscripts in the 10th century. His research is focused on four areas: Islam and Middle Eastern history, Arab Christians in Palestine and the Middle East, the Arab-Israel conflict and Palestinian cities, with an emphasis on the city of Haifa.

He is a lecturer in History of the Middle East, and has publishes several books and research on the topic.

== Published research, articles ==
=== Books ===
- Mansour, J. (2018). Aqeeli Agha (The Biography of Aqeeli Agha El-Hassi).
- Mansour, J. (2018). Religiousness in The Israeli Educational Curriculum.
- Mansour, J. (2017). The Balfour Declaration Centennial (1917–2017).
- Mansour, J. (2016). The Land Day.
- Mansour, J. (2015). co-author of the photography book 'Contra el Olvido: Memoria Fotográfica de Palestina antes de la Nakba, 1889-1948' with Sandra Barrilaro, Teresa Aranguren, Bichara Khader and prologue by Pedro Martínez Montávez. Bilingual book in Arabic and Spanish from Ediciones del Oriente y del Mediterráneo
- Mansour, J. (2015). Haifa: A Word that has Become a City (Pictorial History).
- Mansour, J. (2014). Israel and the Settlement Project: Constant and Changing Policies of Governments, Parties and Public Opinion (1967–2013).
- Mansour, J. (2012). Arab Christians in Israel: Facts, Figures and Trends. (in English)
- Mansour, J. (2010). Lexicon of Israeli and Zionist Personalities and Terms.
- Mansour, J. (2009). The Social-Economic Changes of the Palestinian Cities During the British Mandate.
- Mansour, J. (2007). Jews and Arabs in Haifa During the British Mandate in Palestine (1920–1948), with Daphna Sharfman and Eli Nachmias. (English).
- Mansour, J. (2007). Al-Miftah (the Key Lexicon). Beir Zeit Uni.
- Mansour, J. (2007). Haifa Arab Tours.
- Mansour, J. (2005). The Israeli Settlements.
- Mansour, J (ed.) (2005). We Are More Strong than any Storm. (Articles dedicated for Elias Chacour).
- Mansour, J. (2004). Between Two States.
- Mansour, J. (2008). The Hijaz Railway: The History & Development of Daraa – Haifa Railway.
- Mansour, J & Mansour H. (2007). Reineh: History, Memory & Reality.
- Mansour, J. (1989). Haifa Arab Streets. New edition 1999.
- Mansour, J. (1998). Arab Government and Society in The Middle Ages.
- Mansour, J. (1998). Feasts and Seasons in the Arab Culture.
- Mansour, J. (1993). The Historical Guide of the Twentieth Century Events & the Jewish Modern History.
- Mansour, J & Bahou I. (1991). The Modern History of the Middle East.
- Mansour, J & Bahou I. (1990). Names & Terms in The Arab and Middle East History.
- Mansour, J. (ed.) (1990). Fifty Years for the Hajjar Bishop Memory.
- Mansour, J & Faour Y. (1989). Arab History in the Middle Ages.
- Mansour, J & Faour Y. (1989). The Ancient Civilization.
- Mansour, J. (1989). The Canaanites.
- Mansour, J. (1985). A New Vision of the Life and Deeds of Bishop Gregorios Hajjar. New edition 2013.

=== Articles ===
Selective articles in English & Other Languages:

- “Die Arabische Kultural Seinigendes Element in den Ortskirchen” in Harald Suermann(ed.), ZwischenHalbmond Und Davidstern- Christliche Theologie in Palastina heute. Herder, Freiburg, 2001. pp. 175–190.
- "International Political Changes & their Influence on Christian Arabs in the Middle East", in Al-Liqa Journal, Vol.24, Aug. 2005, pp. 91–105. (Jerusalem).
- "The Hijaz – Palestine Railway and the Development of Haifa", in Jerusalem Quarterly (28), 2006, pp. 5–21.
- "Le Chemin de Fer Du Hedjaz au debut 20 siecle", in Revue d'etudesPalestiniennes, 2006 (99). pp. 76–87. (Paris).
- "L'emergence du Movement SportifPalestinien sous le Mandat", in Kenneth Brown(ed.). Haifa EtatsD'Esprit States of Mind. Albiana, Paris 2010.
- "Historicizing Climate: Haifawis and Haifo’im Remembering the Winter of 1950" with Dan Rabinowitz in Mahmoud Yazbak&Yfaat Weiss(eds.). Haifa Before & After 1948, Narratives Of A Mixed City. Institute for Historical Justice and Reconciliation(The Hague), Dordrecht, The Netherlands, 2011.
- "Acre and Haifa: Sisters on Two Sides of a Single Bay", in Jadal (Mada al-Carmel Research Institute Journal), Issue 18, Oct. 2013.
- "The Arabic Language in a Struggle", in Academia. edu. (2015).
- "Secrets of Espionage Hidden in Family Papers: Charles Boutagy and the Nili Network During World War 1", in Jerusalem Quarterly, Issue. 66, 2016.

=== Papers presented ===
- "Haifa in Biographies from The Mandate Time", in Haifa in Arabic, Haifa in Hebrew conference in Haifa University organized by The Van Leer Jerusalem Institute, in May, 2015.
- "Abdallah Mukhlis: His Life and Role in Exposing Arab and Islamic Heritage in Palestine", in Arab Heritage conference held in Al – Qasimi Academic College, March 2015.
- Political Voices from Palestine in The First Arab National Conference in Paris 1913(The 100 years anniversary 2013).
- Water Mills in Galilee and their Role in Social Changes in the Late Nineteenth Century. Agriculture in Bilad al- Sham from the Byzantine time to the end of The Ottoman Empire Conference, Jordan University, 2013.
- The Strategic Situation in the Middle East Till 2015. (2007), Amman, Middle East Studies Center.
- The Security System of Israel after the Second Lebanese War. (2007), Amman, The New Jordanian Studies Center.
- The Teaching System of Minorities During Conflicts. (2006), Maccedonia & Kosovo Step by Step Center.
- Palestinian Churches after 1948(1998), Catholic Church in Hampelstadt(London).
- Media & Human Dignity in the Holy Land(1995), Mexico: World Association for Christian Communication(WACC).
- Media & Education in Israel During the Peace Process(1995), Mexico: WACC.
- The Christian Local Press & Media(1993), Cyprus: The Middle East Council of Churches.
