= Ahmad Muhammad Al-Khatib =

Kuwaiti doctor and politician (1927–2022)

Member of the National Assembly of Kuwait
- In office October 20, 1992 – October 7, 1996
- In office March 9, 1985 – July 3, 1986
- In office February 10, 1971 – August 29, 1976
- In office January 29, 1963 – December 28, 1965 (Note: On December 7, 1965, a group of eight opposition deputies, including al-Khatib, submitted a resignation letter protesting the passage of laws they viewed as unconstitutional. Their resignations were accepted on December 28, 1965.)

Personal details
- Born: 1927 Kuwait City, Sheikhdom of Kuwait
- Died: 6 March 2022 (aged 94–95) Kuwait City, Kuwait
- Party: Arab Nationalist Movement; Kuwait Democratic Forum
- Education: American University of Beirut
- Occupation: Doctor

Ahmad Muhammad Al-Khatib (Arabic: أحمد محمد الخطيب; 1927 – 6 March 2022) was a Kuwaiti politician. A founder of the Arab Nationalist Movement and the Kuwait Democratic Forum, he served in the National Assembly from 1963 to 1965, 1971 to 1976, and 1985 to 1996. He died in Kuwait City on 6 March 2022, at the age of 95.
