= Arab Nationalist Movement =

Arab Nationalist Movement حركة القوميين العرب
- Abbreviation: ANM, MAN
- General Secretary: George Habash
- Founders: George Habash; Hani al-Hindi; Wadie Haddad; Ahmad Muhammad Al-Khatib; Hamed al-Jubouri
- Founded: 1951 or 1954
- Dissolved: 1970
- Succeeded by: Arab Socialist Action Party (Right-wing faction); Nearly a dozen rival parties
- Ideology: Arab nationalism; Arab socialism (from 1961); Pan-Arabism; Nasserism (from 1965); Secularism; Progressivism; Anti-Zionism; Factions: Marxism; Marxism-Leninism (from 1967)
- Political position: Right-wing; Faction: Left-wing
- Colors: Black White Green; Red (Pan-Arab colors)

Party flag

The Arab Nationalist Movement (Arabic: حركة القوميين العرب, romanized: Ḥarakat al-Qawmiyyīn al-ʿArab), also known as the Movement of Arab Nationalists and the Harakiyyin (حركيين, Ḥarakiyyīn), was a pan-Arab nationalist organization influential in much of the Arab world, particularly within the Palestinian movement. It was first established in the 1950s by George Habash with the primary focus on Arab unity.

== Origins and ideology ==
The Arab Nationalist Movement had its origins in a student group led by George Habash at the American University of Beirut, which emerged in the 1950s. Because Habash thought that the reclaiming of Palestine was a community effort, the dissemination of a united Arab identity was critical for collective action following the establishment of the new State of Israel in 1948. In 1948, Habash, along with other students, namely, Hani al-Hindi, Wadie Haddad, Ahmad al-Khatib, Saleh Shibel, Hamed al-Juburi, and other scholars united due to their similar ideologies and partook in a student political movement which later expanded into what was known as the Al-Kata'ib al-fida' al-'Arabi in 1949.

The main focus was Arab unity, avenging the loss of Palestine, and anti-colonialism toward the British. They soon realized it was not working as they had assumed. Around 1951, they proceeded to launch a political movement instead which developed into the Arab Nationalist Movement (ANM). The ANM was influenced strongly by events that occurred in the timeframe of 1961–1973 in the Middle East, especially the breakup of the United Arab Republic (UAR) in 1961, the 1967 Six-Day War and the 1973 Arab–Israeli War. Among its primary political competitors in the mid-twentieth century was the Ba'ath Party.

The ANM was based strongly on the influence of the Arab nationalist ideology of Constantin Zureiq who was known as the father of Arab nationalism and advocated for secularism. This ideology placed emphasis on the formation of a nationally conscious intellectual elite which would play a vanguard role in a revolution of Arab consciousness, leading to Arab unity and social progress. This Arab nationalist approach meant an uncompromising hostility to Western imperialism in general and to Israel in particular, as the movement took a leading role in the formation of anti-Zionist doctrine. Ideologically, the ANM committed to socialism and secularism, later emphasizing Marxism. Gamal Abdel Nasser was the main advocate of a socialist ideology within the ANM, where he promoted the idea of “recovering Palestine.”

Marxist ideology arose within the movement later, as it was initially viewed negatively due to its association with Soviet support for the partition of Palestine. It was only in 1951, after a few years of reading and learning about the unification movement and revolution, that the ideology diffused and was implemented into the ANM.

The group formed branches in various Arab states, and adopted the name Arab Nationalist Movement in 1958. Some political divergence arose within the movement. Many, especially in Syria and Iraq, became close to local Nasserist movements, and indeed turned into the main pillar of Nasserism in some parts of the Levant. However, another faction moved towards Marxism, including Habash and Nayef Hawatmeh, which brought them into conflict with Gamal Abdel Nasser and increasingly led them to place a heavier emphasis on socialism than pan-Arab nationalism. In addition, the differing systems of government in the Arab countries forced the ANM branch organizations to adapt to local conditions, and it became increasingly difficult to find common ground. This subsequently resulted in a failure in the revolutionary process of the Arab Nationalist Movement.

== Decline and disintegration ==
The break-up of the United Arab Republic contributed to the internal fracturing of the ANM. Their failure was also propelled by the defeat of Egypt in the 1967 Six-Day War, which had led to the discrediting of Nasserism, and forced the ANM to play down its uniting, pan-Arab creed. The final blow to the ANM had come in 1967–69, after a series of conferences. Nasserism was denounced by Arab Nationalists due to failure of the Nasser revolution to aid in the unity and regain of Palestinian territory, which was the ANM's main goals since the beginning. The failure of the ANM resulted in the creation of other parties, also created by Habash such as the PFLP which later became a strong force for Palestinian liberation and Arab unity.

== Bahrain ==
The Bahraini ANM cadres initially joined the Popular Front for the Liberation of the Occupied Arabian Gulf. In 1974 the Bahraini sector of PFLOAG was converted into the Popular Front for the Liberation of Bahrain. Today the Popular Front has given birth to National Democratic Action Society, a prominent secular opposition party in country.

== Egypt ==
In Egypt, an ANM branch was formed after fifteen ANM members arrived in Cairo after being expelled from the American University of Beirut in the year 1955. The influence of the ANM started being particularly important especially with the emergence of Egyptian president Nasser in the mid-1950s. His opposition to the 1955 Baghdad Pact, his anti-Western stance, his decision to nationalize the Suez Canal and the subsequent tripartite invasion of Egypt in October 1956 made Gamal Abdel Nasser become a very popular figure in the pan-Arab movement. This pushed the ANM to shape its policy and strategy in order to merge into Nasser's Egyptian branch of the Arab Socialist Union. By the 1950s, Nasser's self-proclaimed leadership over the Arab nationalist movement put Egypt as the Arab nation ready to unite with its fellow Arabs.

Arab nationalism became the predominant radical, on the whole anti-Western, ideology in the country, which was by nature the most important Arab state and served as a bridge between the Western and the Arab worlds in the 1950s. Nasser played a crucial role in the spreading of nationalist ideas shared by the ANM, as he led a nationalistic attack against Western military alliances in 1955, starting to mobilize Arab public sentiment.

His contribution was so influential, that when Egypt was defeated at the end of the Six-Day War, the consequences on the pan-Arab sentiment were dramatic. By the time the Egyptian troops withdrew in December 1967, this debilitating war had alienated many Egyptians from the ideal of Arab nationalism, cementing an isolationist impulse not to get mired in the quicksand of Arab politics.

== Iraq ==
Similar events led to the growth of the ANM in Iraq. In the aftermath of the overthrow of Abdul-Karim Qasim in 1963, the Iraqi branch of the Ba'ath Party had established a government which collapsed in disorder and was replaced in November that year by a more broadly-based pan-Arab government under Abdul Salam Arif. The ANM again played a major role in Iraqi politics, close to the Nasserist elements in Arif's government. After the Nasserists lost influence and withdrew from the government in July 1964, the ANM continued to collaborate with them and in September that year attempted a coup. In 1964, the ANM merged into the Iraqi Arab Socialist Union.

== Jordan ==
In Jordan, the ANM influenced the political landscape and led to the foundation of nationalistic organizations in the country in the 1950s and 1960s. In fact, George Habash and his group of activists allegedly absorbed other groups with similar ideologies in Lebanon, Syria, and also Jordan. During the years up to 1956, Haddad left Beirut to spread Arab nationalist ideas in Jordan, where Palestinians teamed up with Jordanians to give birth to the Jordanian National Movement (JNM). Ideas of Arab nationalism easily spread in Jordan, especially as means to channel strong sentiments against the Hashemites' government. The JNM presented its ideals as the “new”, opposite to the “old” Hashemite-Western national structure, calling for Arab nationalism and raising awareness among the population calling them to action. Jordanian and Palestinian people cooperated in the Movement, in order for it to become a large umbrella for opposition activities, especially after Jordan united with the West Bank in 1950.

Many branches of nationalistic and anti-imperial movements in the Middle East developed in Jordan during the 1950s, namely the JNM, the Communist Party, the Ba'ath Party, the National Front, the Movement of Arab Nationalists, and the National Socialist Party (NSP). Moreover, Mahmud al-Mu'ayta and Shahir Abu Shahut established the Free Officers’ Movement within the Arab Legion, composed of young Arab officers aligning themselves ideologically with the Ba'ath Party. This movement took some important aspects of the ANM political ideology, such as the rejection of any compromise with Israel and the belief in an act of revenge laying in Arab unity.

Between 1951 and 1953, Habash and Haddad set up a medical clinic in Amman and started treating refugees and the poor of the city for free. At the same time, they launched literacy campaigns, with doctors, teachers and students speaking in political clubs around Jordan to spread their message.

Following the influence of the ANM, in July 1954, The National Socialist Party (NSP) was founded, composed of moderate leftist, mostly Jordanian, politicians.

This newly active and animated political debate in Jordan posed a threat to the political leadership, especially because of the opposition movements' connections with Nasser's ideology and with other organizations in Arab states, such as the ANM.

== Kuwait ==
In Kuwait the ANM branch was reconstituted as the Progressive Democrats, a political party still in existence.

== Lebanon ==
In Lebanon the Hawatmeh wing (which had in majority in the Lebanon branch) reconstituted itself as the Organization of Lebanese Socialists in 1968, and in later merged with Socialist Lebanon to form the Communist Action Organization in Lebanon, which was active during the Lebanese Civil War and in the Hezbollah-led resistance to Israel's occupation of the Lebanese south (1982–2000). The Habash loyalists formed the Arab Socialist Action Party – Lebanon.

== Oman ==
In 1964 the ANM branch in Oman participated in the formation of the Dhofar Liberation Front (DLF). The ANM as a whole supported the Dhofar Rebellion. NLFD later transformed into the Popular Front for the Liberation of the Occupied Arabian Gulf (PFLOAG), later the Popular Front for the Liberation of Oman (PFLO). This group led an insurgency in Dhofar for several years in the 1960s and early 1970s, driving government forces from large swaths of territory. It was eventually defeated in the early 1970s by Sultan Qaboos, backed by British and Iranian forces. After resistance inside Oman was broken in 1975, the group remained as a minor military and political force based in the sympathetic neighboring state of South Yemen, which had backed the Dhofar rebellion, until the 1980s.

== Palestine ==
=== Popular Front for the Liberation of Palestine ===
The Marxist–Leninist elements in the ANM reconstituted its Palestinian branch in the mid-1960s as the Palestinian National Liberation Front. In December 1967 NFLP unified with two other Palestinian factions, Heroes of Return (abtal al-awda) and Ahmed Jibril's Palestinian Liberation Front (PLF). Together they formed the Popular Front for the Liberation of Palestine (PFLP), under Habash's leadership.

=== Democratic Front for the Liberation of Palestine ===
In early 1968, a Maoist faction headed by Hawatmeh broke away from PFLP to form the Democratic Front for the Liberation of Palestine (DFLP, initially PDFLP).

The PFLP and DFLP subsequently both spawned a number of breakaway factions, such as the PFLP-GC, the PLF and the FIDA. Many of these groups were active as a leftist hardline opposition within the Palestine Liberation Organization (PLO), and most participated in the Rejectionist Front of 1974.

=== Current situation ===
Even though the PFLP and DFLP remain very active in Palestinian politics and both have played a military role in the Second Intifada, their political support is rather reduced, especially within the occupied territories. Partly, this is related to the decline of the Arab left in general, a trend related to changes in Arab political culture but also to the fall of the Soviet Union. But in addition to that, the specific circumstances of the occupied territories have led to dual pressure from the radical Islamist opposition of Hamas, on the one hand, and the patronage resources available to Fatah through its control of the Palestinian Authority on the other.

== Saudi Arabia ==
The Saudi branch gave birth to the Arab Socialist Action Party – Arabian Peninsula, a Marxist-Nationalist faction aligned with the PFLP.

== Syria ==
In 1962 the Syrian branch, until then a small group of intellectuals almost all of whom were Palestinian, reacted to the break-up of the United Arab Republic by establishing a mass-movement calling for immediate re-unification with Egypt. Membership quickly surged to several thousand, and the leadership participated in the first Ba'athist-led government established after the coup of 8 March 1963, though on a non-party basis. The Ba'ath Party and its allied officers almost immediately after the March coup began purging Nasserists from power, with dismissals, transfers and arrests during the spring of 1963; the ANM was viewed as one of the most serious threats, because of its numerical force and ideological appeal to the Ba'athist constituency. The Ba'ath-ANM tensions culminated in a Nasserist coup attempt led by Jassem Alwan that was struck down in July, 1963, after which Nasserism and the ANM in particular was a spent force in Syria.

The ANM entered the Arab Socialist Union, but both the Hawatmeh and Habash loyalists later reconstituted themselves as independent parties, and the ASU itself splintered repeatedly during the Syrian 1960s and early 1970s.

== Yemen ==
In South Yemen the local ANM branch was instrumental in forming the National Liberation Front which would later become the Yemeni Socialist Party (YSP), the leading political party in the People's Democratic Republic of Yemen. In North Yemen, the members of ANM broke away from the mother organization in June 1968, forming the Revolutionary Democratic Party of Yemen (which would eventually merge into the YSP).

After the reuniting of the two Yemens in 1990, the YSP became the major opposition party in the Republic of Yemen.

== Sources ==
- Aruri, Naseer H. Jordan, a Study in Political Development (1921-1965). The Hague: Martinus Nijhoff, 1972.
- Bobal, R. Thomas. “‘A Puppet, Even Though He Probably Doesn’t Know So’: Racial Identity and the Eisenhower Administration's Encounter with Gamal Abdel Nasser and the Arab Nationalist Movement.” The International History Review 35, no. 5 (October 2013): 943–74. doi:10.1080/07075332.2013.836117.
- Demichelis, Marco, and Paolo Maggiolini. The Struggle to Define a Nation : Rethinking Religious Nationalism in the Contemporary Islamic World. Piscataway, Nj: Gorgias Press, 2017.
- Patai, Raphael. “Nationalism in Jordan.” Current History 36, no. 210 (1959): 77–80.
- Refugees, United Nations High Commissioner for. “Refworld | Jordan: The ‘Arab National Movement’ and Treatment of Its Members by Authorities (January 1999 - March 2006).” Refworld, April 3, 2006. https://www.refworld.org/docid/45f1475b38.html.
- Reich, Bernard. Political Leaders of the Contemporary Middle East and North Africa: A Biographical Dictionary. Google Books. Greenwood Publishing Group, 1990. https://books.google.com/books?id=3D5FulN2WqQC&q=nasser+and+habash.&pg=PA214
