= Palestinian National Liberation Front =

Palestinian Armed Group

- جبهة التحرير الوطني الفلسطيني
- Leader: Hassan Sabarini
- Dates active: 1968–1972
- Ideology: Palestinian nationalism Anti-Zionism
- Size: ~500 Fedayeen

Palestinian National Liberation Front (in Arabic: جبهة التحرير الوطني الفلسطيني) was a Palestinian political and military organization, based amongst Palestinian refugees in Syria. That fought for the liberation of Palestine (Gaza Strip and West Bank), under occupation by the State of Israel. The group existed 1968-1972.

== History ==
Establistment:

The PNLF was founded and organized in 1968 it had approximately 500 fedayeen. They were led by a Palestinian nationalist politician Hassan Sabarini, a leading member of the Palestinian National Council, the legislative body of the Palestine Liberation Organization (PLO).

1968–1972:

The PNLF carried out attacks against Israeli armed forces in Palestinian and Israeli territory. They used guerrilla tactics against the Israel Defense Forces, Sabotage, and targeted assassination of prominent members of Israeli society. During the 1968–1970 War of Attrition. The Fedayeen of the Palestinian National Liberation Front assisted the Egyptians. The Egyptian military hoped to retake the lost territory with heavy artillery attacks, at sea, and the sinking of an Israeli warship, using fighter aircraft that had recently been acquired by the Soviets. Gamal Abdel Nasser hoped to expel the Israeli troops militarily or with international support. The conflict ended in 1970, with both sides declaring victory in the conflict.

Dissolution:

After the war. The PNLF war against Zionism and imperialism ceased to exist in 1972. Most of its former members joined Yasser Arafat's Fatah guerrilla forces.

== Sources ==
- al-watan data report
