= 1992 Palestinian prisoners' hunger strike =

1992 Palestinian hunger strike

- Part of Israeli–Palestinian conflict
- Date: 27 September 1992 – 11 October 1992
- Location: Palestine
- Methods: Hunger strike, protest

The 1992 Palestinian prisoners' hunger strike was a widespread hunger strike undertaken by Palestinians in Israeli custody in the autumn of 1992. One Palestinian prisoner died as a result of the hunger strike, while several Palestinian were killed and several hundred injured by Israeli forces in demonstrations in support of the prisoners.

== Background ==
Following the First Intifada, a mass wave of strikes and civil disobedience in Palestine protesting against Israeli occupation from 1987 to 1991, the Israeli–Palestinian peace process took a significant step forward with the beginning of the Oslo Accords negotiations. The 1992 Israeli legislative election in June 1992 represented another potential move towawrds calming tensions, with the more moderate Israeli Labor Party winning the elections and replacing the hardline Likud-led government. However, tensions in the Israeli–Palestinian conflict remained high through 1992, with a number of significant events occurring, such as the murder of Helena Rapp, the 1992 An-Najah National University standoff, and the French Hill attacks. By the autumn of 1992, progress on the Oslo Accords negotiation appeared to have significantly slowed.

== Events ==
=== Hunger strike ===
On 27 September 1992, a group of Palestinians in Israeli custody announced that they would be launching a hunger strike in protest against the conditions of their detention. Among their complaints were excessive lengths of time in solitary confinement, detention in underground cells, not enough rations and medical care, as well as overly limited family visiting rights. The hunger strike soon spread across all Israeli prisons, with up to 10 000 Palestinian prisoners taking part.

A wave of protests and strikes subsequently broke out across Palestine in support of the hunger strikers, frequently developing into clashes with Israeli forces, with Israeli soldiers trying to forcibly disperse the protests and protesting Palestinians throwing stones at the soldiers. On 1 October, one Palestinian youth was shot and killed by Israeli forces during a protest. The next day, a 15-year-old Palestinian was shot and killed in Hebron after throwing stones at Israeli soldiers.

On 7 October, over 90 Palestinians were injured in support demonstrations, mostly from rubber bullet impacts and tear gas inhalation. One Israeli was injured after being stabbed in the Old City of Jerusalem that day. A group of students at Birzeit University also launched a hunger strike in support of the prisoners. On 10 October, 62 Palestinians were injured by Israeli forces during protests. One 23-year-old Palestinian named Amit Ahmed Hamayel was shot and killed in Beita, Nablus after throwing stones at an Israeli patrol.

On 11 October, negotiators announced that a preliminary deal to end the hunger strike and address some of the prisoners' concerns had been reached, subject to a review by an Israeli government committee. Most Palestinian prisoners subsequently temporarily ended their participation in the hunger strike, as the preliminary deal was reviewed.

=== Continuing protests ===
Some protests continued through Palestine in the days immediately after the end of the hungers strike. On 13 October, two 15-year-old Palestinians were shot and killed by Israeli forces in the Nuseirat refugee camp, and a third in Salfit, as protests clashed with the Israeli military. Despite the deal, prisoners in the Nafha Prison were reported to still be on hunger strike that day.

On 14 October, 26-year-old prisoner Hussein Nimr Assad died of a heart attack in the Shikma Prison due to the effects of his participation in the hunger strike. The same day, a Palestinian teenager was shot and killed by Israeli forces after a protest developed into clashes, and an Israeli farmer was stabbed and killed by Palestinians in Prazon. The day after Assad's death, a one-day general strike was held across the West Bank. On 17 October, his funeral was held in the Jabel Mukaber district of East Jerusalem. The funeral developed into a nationalist demonstration, with multiple rival Palestinian factions taking part in a show of unity. Israeli forces did not interfere with the funeral.

=== Implementation of prisoners' demands ===
In mid-November, Israeli Minister of Internal Security Moshe Shahal announced that some of the prisoners' demands would be implemented. These included increasing the time of family visits from 30 to 45 minutes, allowing prisoners to have radios and televisions inside their cells, and removing asbestos from cell ceilings. Routine strip-searching of prisoners would also be ended. Shahal, however, stated that the demands te reduce the number of prisoners held in each cell as well as to allow the prisoners to celebrate Palestinian national holidays would not be implemented, nor would the demand that prisoners be allowed to receive gifts from their families.

== Reactions ==
=== In Palestine ===
PLO spokesperson Faisal Husseini stated that "people in the street do not weigh up all the promising words - they look to the real changes. And the changes in the prisons are not for the better; in reality, they are for the worse, with more solitary confinements and more brutal interrogations."

=== In Israel ===
The Israeli government claimed that the hunger strike was unrelated to conditions in Israeli prisons, but was instead aimed at putting pressure on Israel during the peace negotiations. Minister of Internal Security Moshe Shahal stated that he recognised that "most families have somebody who was in prison or is in prison," but warned that the hunger strike organisers were "trying to sabotage the peace process by using this issue as a pretext." Prime Minister of Israel Yitzhak Rabin stated that he had ordered the Israeli military to "act with all that is possible within the law to prevent the disturbances, whether by curfews, closures or military activities," and stated that "Palestinians must understand that the solution of the problem is around the negotiation table and not in the streets and alleys of the towns and refugee camps in the territories."

=== Internationally ===
United Nations Committee on the Exercise of the Inalienable Rights of the Palestinian People chair Kéba Birane Cissé stated that the committee had "repeatedly drawn attention to the inhuman conditions of detention of Palestinians in Israeli prisons, including beatings and torture during interrogation, in violation of the Geneva Convention relative to the Protection of Civilian Persons in Time of War, and international human rights standards," and condemned both "that the Israeli authorities have so far refused to address the legitimate grievances of the prisoners, treating them as a security problem, rather than as a human rights issue" and "that support demonstrations have been suppressed with live ammunition and rubber bullets."

== Analysis ==
According to Al Jazeera in 2017, the 1992 hunger strike is "considered one of the most successful hunger strikes in Palestinian history," saying that it resulted in "major achievements, such as shutting down the isolation section of Ramle prison, stopping strip searches, increasing family visitation time and allowing cooking slates into the cells."

In 1992, The Economist described Rabin's handling of the hunger strike as "more delicate" than his handling of the First Intifada, which he had called to be repressed with "force, might, and beatings." The Economist, however, described the ongoing peace negotiations as "painfully slow," noting that it may be impacted by the upcoming 1992 United States presidential election. David Landau of the Jewish Telegraphic Agency, attributed the hunger strike and general rise in tensions to "a sense of frustration over lack of progress in the first round of Israeli-Palestinian peace talks in Washington since the Rabin government came to power."

Following the death of Hamas leader Yahya Sinwar in 2024, during the Gaza war, Lebanese communist Nabih Awadah, who had been imprisoned in the same prison as Sinwar in the early-1990s, claimed that Sinwar had played a key role in organising the hunger strike.

== Aftermath ==
Tensions in the Israeli-Palestinian conflict would remain high through late 1992, despite ongoing peace negotiations. Between 12 and 18 October, three Israelis were killed by Palestinian militants, eight Palestinians were killed by Israeli forces, and four Palestinians were killed as suspected collaborators by Palestinian militants, the deadliest week since Rabin's term as Prime Minister began in June. On 25 October, Israeli sergeant Shmuel Gersh was killed outside of the Cave of the Patriarchs in a Hamas Al-Qassam Brigades attack. In response, several hundred Israeli settlers in Jerusalem held a demonstration that clashed with Israeli police after it attempted to storm the hotel where Rabin was greeting the visiting Prime Minister of Portugal. The same day, a large protest occurred at an Israeli checkpoint in the Gaza Strip, with Gazans working in Israel protesting against the increasing length of time it took to pass the checkpoint.

In 1993, the Oslo I Accord was signed by PLO chair Yasser Arafat and Israeli Prime Minister Yitzhak Rabin. As Oslo Accords negotiations continued through the mid-1990s, another major hunger strike by Palestinians in Israeli custody would occur in 1995, the 1995 Palestinian prisoners' hunger strike, demanding release of all detained Palestinians.

== See also ==
- List of strikes in Palestine
