= Timeline of strikes in 1995 =

Strikes in 1995

In 1995, a number of labour strikes, labour disputes, and other industrial actions occurred.

== Background ==
A labour strike is a work stoppage caused by the mass refusal of employees to work. This can include wildcat strikes, which are done without union authorisation, and slowdown strikes, where workers reduce their productivity while still carrying out minimal working duties. It is usually a response to employee grievances, such as low pay or poor working conditions. Strikes can also occur to demonstrate solidarity with workers in other workplaces or pressure governments to change policies.

== Timeline ==
=== Continuing strikes from 1994 ===
- 1994–95 Bridgestone strike, 10-month strike by Bridgestone workers in the United States, represented by the United Rubber Workers.
- 1991–1998 Caterpillar labor dispute, including strikes by Caterpillar Inc. workers in the United States.
- 1991 Frontier strike, over 6-years long strike by workers at the New Frontier Hotel and Casino, represented by the Culinary Workers Union, one of the longest strikes in American history.
- 1994–95 Major League Baseball strike, 7-month strike by Major League Baseball players in Canada and the United States, represented by the Major League Baseball Players Association.
- 1994–95 New Zealand teachers' strike, series of strikes by primary school teachers in Aotearoa New Zealand for pay parity with secondary school teachers.
- 1994–95 Turkish public sector strikes, series of strikes by public sector workers in Turkey over wages.

=== January ===
- 1995 Cypriot referees' strike, 1-week strike by football referees in Cyprus against violence in the sport.
- 1995 Filipino prisoners' hunger strike, 41-day hunger strike by political prisoners in the Philippines.

=== February ===
- 1995 German metalworkers' strike, first metalworkers' strike in Germany in 11 years.

=== March ===
- 1995 Air Inter strike, strike by Air Inter workers in France.
- 1995 Bolshoi strike, strike by Bolshoi Ballet dancers in Russia.
- 1995 Canadian rail strike
- 1995 Kuwait oil workers' strike
- 1995 Renault strike, strike by Renault autoworkers in France.

=== May ===
- 1995 Brazilian oil workers' strike, 31-day strike by Petrobras oil workers in Brazil.
- 1995 Danish nurses' strike, 3-week strike by nurses.
- 1995 Oregon public sector strike
- 1995 Spanish doctors' strike, over wages.

=== June ===
- 1995 Beth Hatefutsoth strike, strike by Nahum Goldmann Museum of the Jewish Diaspora workers in Israel after an 8% pay cut.
- 1995 Indian telecom strike, against privatisation.
- 1995 La Scala strikes, series of strikes at the Teatro alla Scala in Italy.
- 1995 Palestinian prisoners' hunger strike, hunger strike by Palestinians imprisoned by Israel demanding the release of political prisoners.

=== July ===
- 1995 Costa Rican teachers' strike, 5-week strike by teachers in Costa Rica over pensions.
- Detroit newspaper strike of 1995–1997, over unfair labour practices.
- 1995 PT Great River strike, strike by PT Great River Industries garment workers in Indonesia.

=== September ===
- Liverpool dockers' dispute, 850-day dispute in Liverpool in the United Kingdom.
- 1995 Ugandan medical strike, strike by doctors and nurses in Uganda over wages.

=== October ===
- 1995 Boeing strike, 2-month strike by Boeing machinists in the United States.
- 1995 JJ Foods strike, strike by JJ Food Service workers in the United Kingdom over wages and working conditions.
- 1995 University of Manitoba Faculty Association strike in Manitoba, Canada (23 days)
- Weipa Dispute, in Australia.

=== November ===
- 1995 strikes in France, series of strikes against the economic policies of French prime minister Alain Juppé.
- 1995 Full Sutton Prison strike, strike by prisoners at HM Prison Full Sutton in the United Kingdom against the earned privileges scheme.

=== December ===
- 1995 New Zealand air traffic controllers' strike

== List of lockouts in 1995 ==
- 1995 NBA lockout
- 1994–95 NHL lockout
