= Palestinians in Israeli custody =

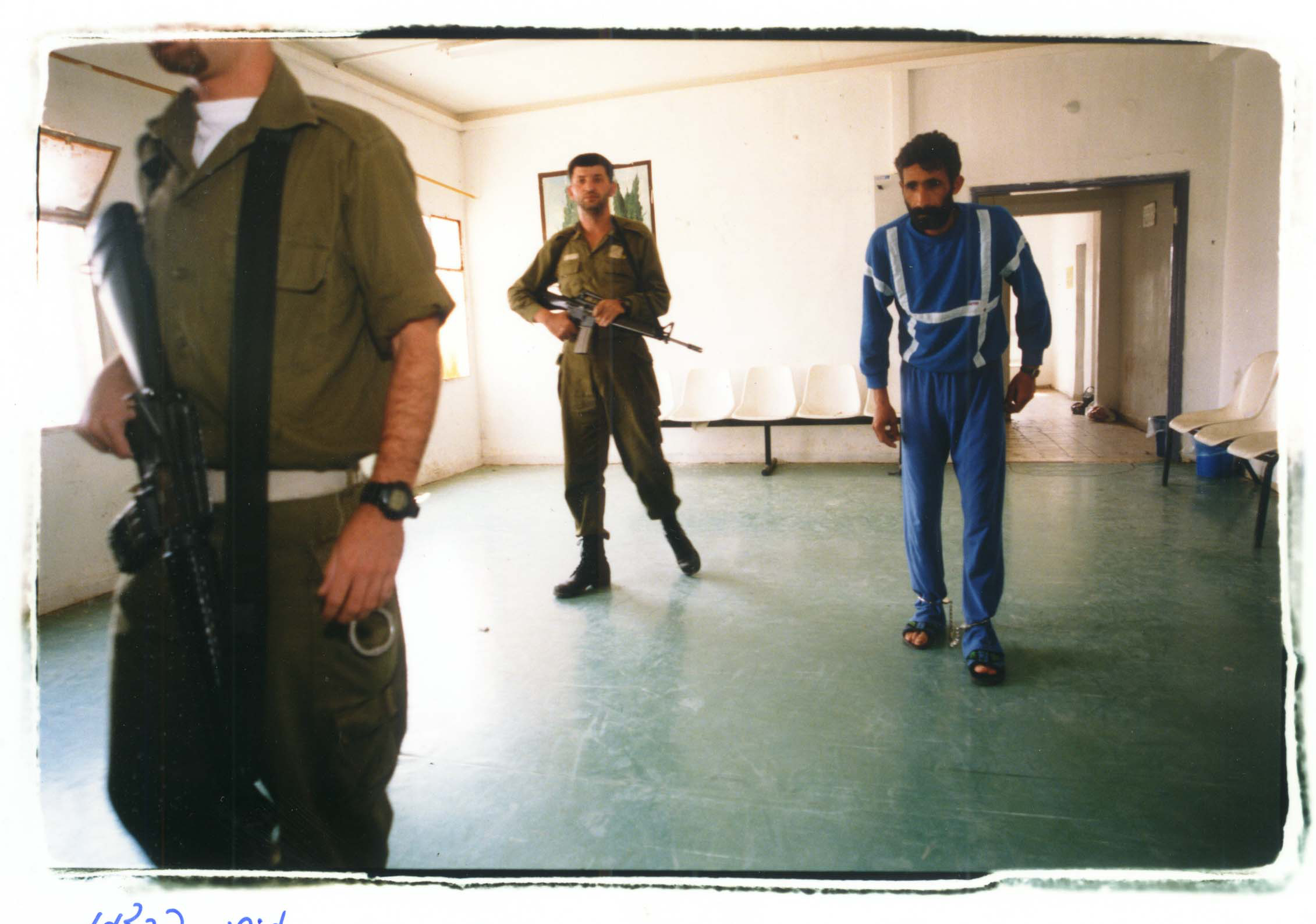
Palestinian in Israeli custody, 2010

The future of Palestinians detained by Israel in the context of the Israeli–Palestinian conflict is considered central to progress in the Israeli–Palestinian peace process. Cases of prison sentences include the charges of "terrorism" or being a member of an "illegal terrorist organization", such as Hamas or, prior to the Oslo Accords, the Palestine Liberation Organization; but, according to some accounts, also the charge of political activism, such as raising a Palestinian flag.

In April 2022, there were 4,450 Palestinian security prisoners in Israeli prisons – including 160 children, 32 women, and over 1,000 "administrative detainees" (indefinitely incarcerated without charge). According to B'tselem, since the outbreak of the Gaza war on 7 October 2023, Palestinian prisoners with Israeli citizenship have been stripped of many of their rights. The organization reported institutionalized abuse of detainees, characterizing the prisons as "torture camps".

In December 2011, 4,772 Palestinian security prisoners were serving terms in Israeli prisons. Out of those, 552 were sentenced to life terms. By July 2024, there were 9,623 Palestinians incarcerated by Israel, 4,781 in administrative detention, for alleged security reasons.

== Overview ==
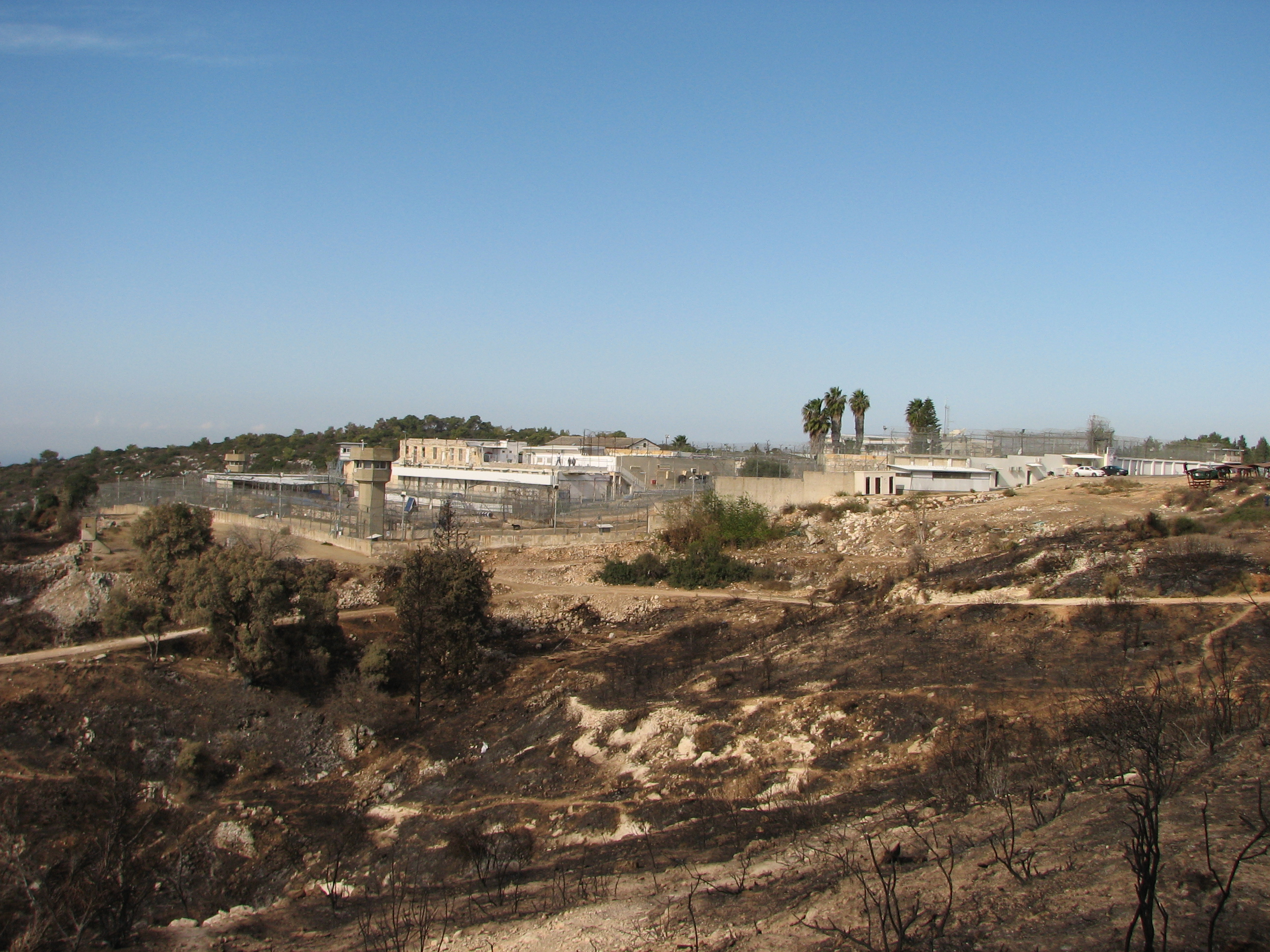
Damon prison, located at the depopulated Palestinian village of Khirbat Al-Dumun

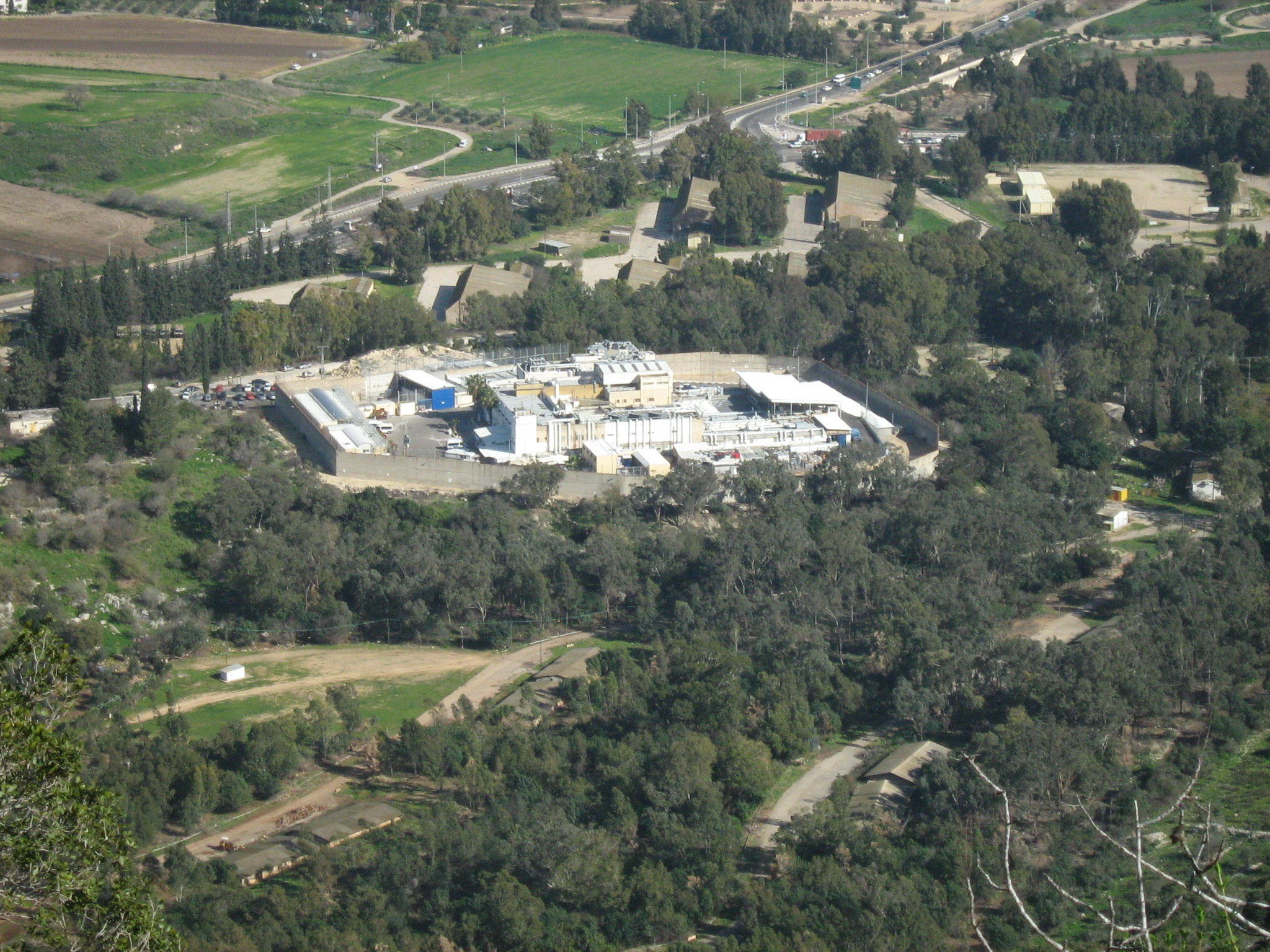
Jalame Prison (Kishon Detention Center), located at the depopulated Palestinian village of Al-Jalama, Haifa

The Israeli military court system for the occupied territories, modeled partially on the British military court system set up in 1937, was established in 1967, and had been called the institutional centerpiece of the occupation, and within it West Bank Palestinians are treated as "foreign civilians".

The measures it applies, combining elements of colonial administration and martial law, cover not only incidents involving recourse to violence but many other activities, non-violent protests, political and cultural statements and the way Palestinians are allowed to move or associate with each other.

Some of the problematic facets of the system Palestinian prisoners are subject to are, according to sociology professor Lisa Hajjar, prolonged detention of suspects incommunicado, impeding a client's access to his lawyer, the routine use of coercion under interrogation to obtain confessions and the introduction of "secret evidence".

Hundreds of thousands of Palestinians have been put on trial since 1967. According to Saree Makdisi, the cumulative total of Palestinians imprisoned by Israel reached 650,000 in 2005. Of these, according to Tamar Pelleg-Sryck (2011), tens of thousands have been subjected to administrative detention. The incarceration rate was the highest in the world during the First Intifada (1987–1992) – and their conviction rates varied from 90 to 95%, being for the most part secured by plea bargains in 97% of cases. According to Red Cross statistics, in the first two decades of the occupation, from 1967 to 1987, one in three Palestinians, about 500,000, were detained by Israeli forces, and on any given day the courts would be crammed with "children in handcuffs, women pleading with soldiers, anxious people thronging lawyers for information." After the Oslo Accords, courts in Palestinian towns were withdrawn to Area C, causing greater difficulty for lawyers and family of the defendant to get access to the tribunals because of the permit system.

The specific practice of administrative detention was initially introduced by the British to subdue Palestinians, but was then increasingly applied to cope with behavior by Jewish political activists and suspected members of Jewish paramilitary organizations, an extension vigorously opposed by Jewish settlers at the time and one which Jewish lawyers in July 1936 argued should be repealed. Dov Yosef likewise argued in 1948 that the practice abolished the writ of habeas corpus and had led to the improper incarceration by the British of numerous Jewish activists. The state of Israel, on securing independence however, retained this body of regulations on the new state's statute book. Article 111 of the Defence (Emergency) Regulations allowed for military commanders to arrest and detain anyone, without public reasons given or the laying of formal charges or trial, for periods of up to one year, though a provision exists for indefinitely extending any person detained under the order. The Fourth Geneva Convention permits detentions, and on these precedents the IDF promulgated its Article 87 of the Order Concerning Security Instructions, and applied it to cases where the rules of evidence of Israeli courts would not allow the suspect to be convicted. Examples of the practice took place early in the occupation. Taisir al-Arouri, a Bir Zeit University professor of Mathematics, was arrested on the night of 21 April 1974 and released on 18 January 1978, after being imprisoned for 45 months without trial or the filing of charges, only after Amnesty International issued a public protest.

In 1978, Michael Goldstein called the detention system "an aberration of criminal justice", but temporary in nature and dictated by an ongoing war situation. He credited Israel with refraining from making it part of their judicial, as opposed to military, system. In a five-month period of the First Intifada alone, Israel put 1,900 Palestinians under an administrative detention order. For the decade from 2000 to 2009 it was estimated that at any one time anywhere between 600 and 1,000 Palestinians were subjected annually to administrative detention. Amnesty International stated that in 2017 Israeli authorities continue to adopt administrative detention rather than criminal prosecution to detain "hundreds of Palestinians, including children, civil society leaders and NGO workers, without charge or trial under renewable orders, based on information withheld from detainees and their lawyers", and that administrative detainees numbered 441.

Notable Palestinians who have been recently subjected to the process include Khalida Jarrar and Ahmad Qatamesh, both of whom are regarded by Amnesty International as prisoners of conscience.

== Number of prisoners ==
According to the Palestinian Centre for Human Rights, from the Six-Day War (1967) to the First Intifada (1988), over 600,000 Palestinians were held in Israeli jails for a week or more. Rory McCarthy, The Guardian's Jerusalem correspondent, estimated that one-fifth of the population has at one time been imprisoned since 1967. On 11 December 2012, the office of then-Prime Minister Salam Fayyad stated that since 1967, 800,000 Palestinians, or roughly 20% of the total population and 40% of the male population, had been imprisoned by Israel at one point in time. About 100,000 had been held in administrative detention. According to Palestinian estimates, 70% of Palestinian families have had one or more family members sentenced to jail terms in Israeli prisons as a result of activities against the occupation.

According to B'Tselem, there was a decline, starting in 1998, in the number of Palestinians held in administrative detention. Less than 20 were held from 1999 to October 2001. However, with the start of the Second Intifada (2000), and particularly after Operation Defensive Shield (2002), the numbers steadily rose. According to the Fédération Internationale des ligues des Droits de l'Homme (FIDH), from the beginning of the Second Intifada to April 2003, more than 28,000 Palestinians were incarcerated. In April 2003 alone there were more than 5,500 arrests.

In 2007, the number of Palestinians under administrative detention averaged about 830 per month, including women and minors under the age of 18. By March 2008, more than 8,400 Palestinians were held by Israeli civilian and military authorities, of which 5,148 were serving sentences, 2,167 were facing legal proceedings and 790 under administrative detention, often without charge or knowledge of the suspicions against them. In 2010, the Palestinian Central Bureau of Statistics reported that there were over 7,000 Palestinians in Israeli jails, of them 264 under administrative detention. Most of the prisoners are held at Ofer Prison in the West Bank and Megiddo and Ketziot prisons in Israel.

In April 2008, Adalah, the Legal Center for Arab Minority Rights in Israel, stated that 11,000 Palestinians were in prison and detention in Israel, including 98 women, 345 minors, 50 members of the Palestinian Legislative Council, and 3 ministers of the Palestinian National Authority. Of these 11,000 Palestinian prisoners, 8,456 were from the West Bank, 762 from the Gaza Strip, and 694 from within Israel itself (including 552 from Jerusalem). In October 2008, Haaretz reported that 600 Palestinians were being held in administrative detention in Israel, including "about 15 minors who do not know even know why they are being detained."

In May 2020, there were 4,236 Palestinian security prisoners in Israeli prisons, including 352 held in administrative detention, meaning incarceration without charge.

In April 2022, there were 4,450 Palestinian security prisoners in Israeli prisons – including 160 children, 32 women, and 530 "administrative detainees" (incarcerated without charge).

Since the 2023 Hamas-led attack on Israel, Israel has revoked work permits for residents of Gaza. Since then, between 4,000 and 5,000 Palestinians working in Israel who were attempting to flee have gone missing, having been detained by the Israeli government. Released Palestinians have recalled being blindfolded with their hands and feet tied and later being beaten by Israeli forces, who withheld food, water, and medical supplies.

In November 2025, the Physicians for Human Rights–Israel, an Israeli human rights organization, reported that at least 98 Palestinians died in custody since October 2023, with 52 dying under military custody and 46 dying in the Israel Prison Service custody.

=== Minors ===
In 2000–2009, 6,700 Palestinians between the ages of 12 and 18 were arrested by the Israeli authorities, according to Defence for Children International's Palestine Section (DCI/PS). In 2009, a total of 423 were being held in Israeli detention and interrogation centers and prisons. In April 2010 the number dropped to 280. DCI/PS states that these detentions stand in contravention of international law. Up to August 2013, 193 minors were imprisoned, and according to The Economist, "nearly all" were "brought to court in leg shackles and handcuffs."

According to data from the Israel Prison Service, as cited in United Nations reports for the years 2011, 2012, and 2013, Israeli authorities have transferred Palestinian children from the occupied West Bank to detention facilities located within Israel proper. Such transfers have been cited as inconsistent with article 76 of the Fourth Geneva Convention relative to the Protection of Civilian Persons in Time of War. Available information indicates that this practice has continued through to 2023, with an estimated annual number of affected children ranging between approximately four hundred and six hundred.

Al Jazeera reported that between 2000 and 2023, 12,000 children have been detained by Israeli forces. In 2023, at least 880 Palestinian children have been detained by the IDF.

In February 2025, Israeli authorities detained Mohammed Zaher Ibrahim, a 15-year-old boy, during a nighttime raid on his family's home in the West Bank. He was accused of stone-throwing, allegations his family denied. Reports during his pre-trial detention indicated that he endured harsh conditions, including significant weight loss, a skin infection, limited medical care, and restricted family contact. His case attracted international attention, with over 100 U.S.-based civil rights, human rights, and faith organizations expressing concern over his treatment and calling for his release. Ibrahim was released in November 2025 following a plea agreement.

One of these children is Muhammad Ibrahim. He is set to be tried by an Israeli military court. Since he is only 16 years old, has been subjected to torture, and has had no contact with his parents for the past eight to nine months, these circumstances should be recognized as part of Israel's human rights violations. It is also important to note that if convicted, he could face up to 20 years in prison.

=== Public figures ===
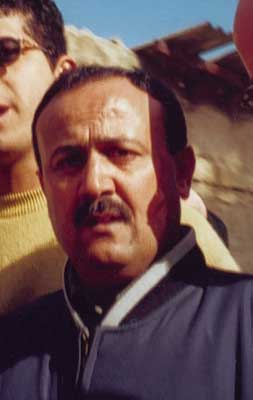
Marwan Barghouti, a leader of the al-Aqsa Martyrs Brigades militia, convicted by Israeli court on five counts of murder and sentenced to five life sentences and forty years in prison.

There are several Palestinian leaders and politicians held in Israeli jails, including 47 Hamas members of the Palestinian Legislative Council, in addition to some ministers and the mayors and municipal council members of various towns and cities in the West Bank.

Marwan Barghouti a leader of the al-Aqsa Martyrs Brigades militia and al-Mustaqbal political party, was arrested and tried by an Israeli civilian court for attacks carried out by the Al-Aqsa Martyrs' Brigades. He was convicted on 20 May 2004 on five counts of murder and sentenced to five life sentences and forty years.

Ahmad Sa'adat, secretary-general of the Popular Front for the Liberation of Palestine (PFLP) is currently imprisoned by Israel. In 2002, he was tried, convicted and imprisoned in Jericho by the Palestinian National Authority, for his role in the assassination of Israeli Tourism Minister Rehavam Zeevi on 17 October 2001 by the PFLP. The Palestinian Supreme Court later declared his imprisonment unconstitutional. His imprisonment by the PNA, rather than extradition to Israel as required by the Oslo Accords, was negotiated between the PNA, Israel, the United States, and the United Kingdom. Under the terms of the agreement, the imprisonment was to be monitored by US and UK observers. On 14 March 2006, after both the American and British monitors, as well as the Palestinian guards of the Jericho jail abandoned their posts, Israeli forces surrounded the prison in Jericho and took Sa'adat, who has since been under administrative detention.

In 2005, three members of Nablus's municipal council including the mayor Adly Yaish, Qalqilya mayor Wajih Qawas, Beita mayor Arab Shurafa, and two members of the Bani Zeid municipal council – all members of Hamas were arrested.

== Payments by Palestinian Authority ==
In 2003, Palestinian law mandated a monthly salary of $250 to Palestinian security detainees imprisoned in Israel for up to five years, with a higher payment to those serving a longer term. Those who served a life sentence were paid $1,000 per month. In January 2011, Prime Minister Salam Fayyad enacted an amendment to increase these payments by 300%.

In March 2009, an extra $190 was added to these payments to prisoners affiliated with Palestine Liberation Organization factions in Israeli prisons. Each PLO-affiliated prisoner receives $238 per month, along with an extra $71 if they're married and $12 for each child.

As of May 2011, the Palestinian Authority spent $4.5 million per month paying Palestinian prisoners in Israeli jails, including prisoners convicted of murdering civilians, and $6.5 million to the families of suicide bombers. The salaries, funded by the PA, are given to Fatah, Hamas, and Islamic Jihad prisoners. These payments comprise 6% of the PA's budget. Hamas member Abdullah Barghouti, who was sentenced to 67 life terms for perpetrating the killings of 67 Israelis, receives NIS 4,000. In addition, prisoners who have been imprisoned for over 30 years receive NIS 12,000 ($3,000) per month.

In November 2011, ahead of the Eid Al-Adha holiday, the Palestinian Authority paid Palestinian prisoners 550 NIS (about $140), as well as 50 NIS (about $12) to purchase sweets during the holiday.

== Prisoner exchanges and releases ==
Israel has released Palestinians in prisoner exchange agreements concluded with various Palestinian militia factions. In 1985, Israel released 1,150 prisoners, including Sheikh Ahmed Yassin, in exchange for three Israeli POWs being held by Ahmed Jibril. The 1995 Interim Agreement on the West Bank and the Gaza Strip called for the release of Palestinian detainees in stages, as part of a series of "confidence-building measures". Upon the Israeli withdrawal from populated Palestinian centers in 1995, many Palestinians in military jails were transferred to jails inside Israel, which some Palestinian activists said was a breach of articles 49 and 76 of the Geneva Convention, prohibiting deportations. The 1998 Wye River Memorandum specified that Israel was to release 750 Palestinian prisoners, some 250 of which were released by the time of the Sharm el-Sheikh Memorandum in 1999. Wye 2 reduced the number of those to be released from 500 to 350, and these were freed by mid-October 1999. Israeli released 26 security prisoners at the beginning of Ramadan, half of whom had a few months left to serve. An additional seven prisoners from East Jerusalem were released the next day after protests from the Palestinian Authority, which had expected more. In 2000, another 18 prisoners were released as a goodwill gesture in March and June.

At the Sharm el-Sheikh Summit on 8 February 2005, Israel pledged to release another 900 Palestinian prisoners of the 7,500 being held at the time. By the spring of 2005, 500 of those were released, but after Qassam rocket attacks on Sderot on 5 May, Ariel Sharon withheld the release of the remaining 400, citing the need for the Palestinian Authority to rein in militants.

On 25 August 2008, Israel released 198 prisoners in a "goodwill gesture" to encourage diplomatic relations and support Fatah leader Mahmoud Abbas.

On 15 December 2008, Israel released 224 Palestinian prisoners from Ofer Prison in the West Bank, 18 of them released to the Gaza Strip.

In 2011, the Israeli government released 1,027 Palestinian prisoners in exchange for Gilad Shalit, an Israeli soldier held by Palestinian militants in the Gaza Strip for more than five years. Hamas leader Ahmed Jabari was quoted in the Saudi Arabian newspaper Al-Hayat as confirming that the prisoners released as part of the deal were collectively responsible for the killing of 569 Israeli civilians. The agreement was the largest prisoner exchange agreement in Israeli history and the highest price Israel has ever paid for a single soldier. Gilad Shalit was also the first captured Israeli soldier to be released alive in 26 years.

In October 2012, according to data compiled by the Israeli daily Yedioth Ahronoth, dozens of the prisoners released in the Gilad Shalit exchange had resumed terror activity. Many had joined the leadership of Hamas, others had developed weapons and fired rockets, some had recruited members to terrorist cells in the West Bank. Former prisoners in the West Bank have also engaged in violent activity, and Israel arrested 40 of them for rioting, throwing Molotov cocktails, funneling money to terrorism, and other acts. One cell in Hebron planted a bomb in Jerusalem and plotted to kidnap an Israeli soldier. However, a senior defense official stated that cooperation between Israeli security forces and Palestinian Authority was effective in tracking the individuals and preventing further attacks.

In August 2013, the Israeli Cabinet agreed on a four-stage process by which 104 Palestinian prisoners would be released as part of a "confidence-building" measure aimed at boosting renewed Israeli-Palestinian peace negotiations. All of the prisoners slated for release were convicted for terrorism against Israel before the signing of the Oslo Accords in September 1993; most were either directly involved in the murder of Israelis and many were serving life sentences.

In December 2013, Israel freed another 26 Palestinian prisoners under the peace talks brokered by US Secretary of State John Kerry.

During the 2023 Gaza war ceasefire, in exchange for the 240 hostages taken during the October 7 attacks, Israel propositioned to release 300 prisoners, most of them women and children. Over two-thirds of these prisoners had not been formally convicted of any crime or charged with any crime. As of 28 November, 150 prisoners have been released. Israel then banned large gatherings in the West Bank. Since the start of the 2023 Gaza war ceasefire, Israel detained 168 Palestinians, more than it has released.

== Breach of international law ==
=== "Terrorists" versus "prisoners of war" ===
In July 2003, the International Federation for Human Rights (FIDH) reported that "Israel does not recognize Palestinian prisoners as having the status of prisoners of war." The prisoners are instead treated as politically motivated criminals or terrorists, and either charged with terrorist offences, violent crimes, or administratively detained without charge.

It has been argued by pro-Palestinian supporters that according to the Geneva Conventions, Palestinians who are members of armed resistance organizations should be entitled to prisoner of war status and not called terrorists.

The position of the Geneva Conventions with regard to Palestinians detained for armed activity against Israeli forces is not entirely clear. Additional Protocol I – which applies during armed conflicts against alien occupations (Article 1(4) ) – would give lawful combatant status (and therefore prisoner of war status if captured) to fighters who do not wear uniforms or have a distinctive mark due to the nature of the conflict, so long as they carry arms openly during military engagements (see Article 44(3) ). However, this protocol has not been ratified by Israel.

The Third Geneva Convention of 1949, which Israel has ratified, provides more limited protection, giving prisoner of war status to fighters in organised resistance movements fulfill conditions laid out in Article 4(2), including "being commanded by a person responsible for his subordinates" and "having a fixed distinctive sign recognizable at a distance", with Article 4(6) protecting inhabitants of non-occupied territory who spontaneously resist the enemy in some circumstances.

=== Deportation of prisoners ===
Until the early 1990s, Palestinian prisoners were held in detention facilities in the West Bank and the Gaza Strip. Since then, most of them are deported to prisons and detention centres on Israeli territory This was described as a violation of the Fourth Geneva Convention, which states that detained persons have the right to remain in occupied territory in all stages of detention, including serving of sentences if convicted. On 28 March 2010, the Supreme Court of Israel rejected a petition by the human rights group Yesh Din seeking to halt the practice of detention inside Israel.

=== Administrative detention ===
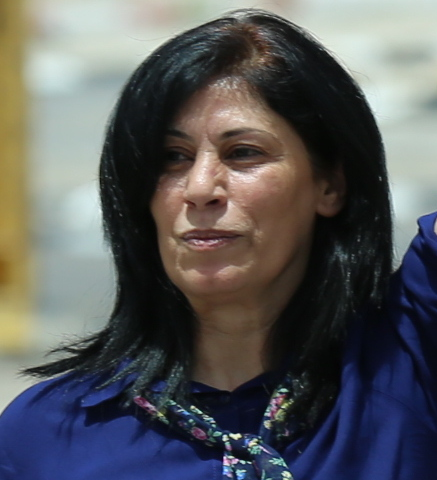
Khalida Jarrar, a Palestinian politician who was held in administrative detention.

Israel has imprisoned Palestinians for prolonged periods without charging them or putting them on trial. Israel has said that detention without trial is a necessary security measure used to avoid exposing confidential information in trials. The European Union has criticized the policy. Within the West Bank, any local army commander can issue an administrative detention order, and the order can be appealed at the local military court, or, if denied there, at the Supreme Court. However, the Supreme Court almost never intervenes.

The first use of an administrative detention order in the West Bank following the Six-Day War was on 3 September 1967. Over 100 people were detained during the first year of the occupation. The detainees were held for up to a year or deported. In 1974 there was a crack down on Palestinian nationalist organizations which led to 200 people being detained, some of whom were held without trial for five years. In 1978 Amnesty International launched an appeal against the use of administrative detention which led to a change in procedures. The number detained fell from 30 cases in 1978 to only one in 1981. He was released in March 1982 having been held for seven years. The use of administrative detention orders resumed in August 1985 with over 100 detained in two weeks.

Some notable examples include:

- On 20 March 2010, Moatasem Nazzal, a 16-year-old Palestinian was arrested at his home in Qalandiya refugee camp without explanation and remained imprisoned until 26 December 2010.
- On 17 December 2011, Israel arrested Khader Adnan for "activities that threaten regional security". While Adnan was a member of the Palestinian Islamic Jihad, Israel did not accuse Adnan of direct involvement in any attacks by the group. Israeli officials did not charge him with any crime. After Adnan went on a hunger strike, the Israeli justice ministry announced that he would be released. This announcement reportedly cancelled a judicial review of the Israeli practice to hold prisoners without trial.
- On 21 November 2015, Palestinian journalist Muhammad al-Qiq was put on administrative detention, allegedly for "terror activity". His case gained notoriety as he went on a hunger strike to protest his detention. He was released on 19 May 2016 after enduring a 94-day hunger strike and without having been charged with any crime.
- On 15 June 2016, Bilal Kayed was placed under administrative detention after being released from a 15-year-long prison sentence. Kayed went on a hunger strike and eventually reached a deal with Israeli authorities to be released at the end of the six months.
- On 3 April 2017, a 16-year-old boy Nour Issa was placed under administrative detention for four months (subsequently extended to seven) on charges of "incitement on Facebook".

As of January 2012, 309 Palestinians were held without criminal charges, according to B'Tselem:

- 16 Palestinians have been held without charge for 2–4.5 years
- 88 have been held for 1–2 years
- 80 have been held for 6 months-1 year

In July 2012 the number had decreased to 250. According to the Israel Prison Service figures for December 2012, 178 Palestinians were being held in administrative detention (without charge or trial). According B'Tselem that number had risen to 352 in May 2020.

As of August 2022, more than 700 persons were held in administrative detention, all of them Palestinian including 7 Israeli citizens. According to the Israeli rights group HaMoked, as of 2023, there are over 1,000 detainees, the highest figure since 2003.

On 2 May 2023, Khader Adnan died following an 87-day hunger strike while in administrative detention for the 12th time.

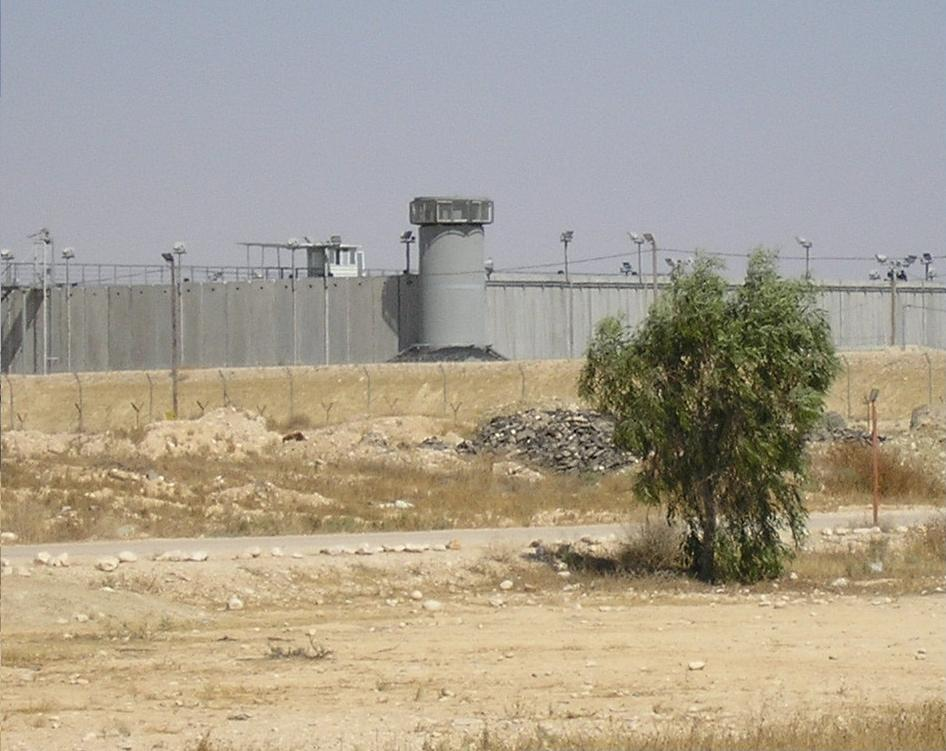
The Israeli detention center of Ktzi'ot, in the Neguev desert, 2007

In August 2023, 1,264 Palestinians were held in administrative detention in Israel, without charge or trial, the highest number in three decades. After the start of the Gaza war, the number of Palestinians held in administrative detention rose from 1,319 to 2,070 between 1 October 2023 and 1 November 2023. The number of prisoners in administrative detention continued to increase to 3,291 in January 2024.

== Human rights abuses ==
=== Physical torture ===
Until 1999, "moderate physical pressure" was permitted in the interrogation of suspects by the Israeli Shin Bet, as outlined in the Landau Commission report of 1987. B'Tselem drew up a list of alleged interrogation methods that includes: "depriving the interrogee of sleep for a number of days by binding him or her in painful positions; playing loud music; covering their head with a filthy sack; exposing the interrogee to extreme heat and cold; tying them to a low chair, tilting forward; tightly cuffing the interrogee's hands; having the interrogee stand, hands tied and drawn upwards; having the interrogee lie on his back on a high stool with his body arched backwards; forcing the interrogee to crouch on his toes with his hands tied behind him; violent shaking of the detainee, the interrogator grasping and shaking him; using threats and curses, and feeding him poor-quality and insufficient amounts of food."

In 1997, the United Nations Committee Against Torture stated that such methods constituted torture and were in breach of the United Nations Convention against Torture and Other Cruel, Inhuman or Degrading Treatment or Punishment, a convention ratified by Israel in 1991. In September 1999, Israel's High Court ruled that the Israeli Security Agency (ISA) does not have legal authority to use physical means of interrogation that are not "reasonable and fair" and cause the detainee to suffer. While the court noted that a reasonable interrogation is likely to cause discomfort and put pressure on the detainee, this is lawful only if "it is a 'side effect' inherent to the interrogation," and not aimed at tiring out or "breaking" the detainee as an end in itself.

Uri Davis wrote that the ruling of 1999 came after 50 years of silence "in the face of systematic torture practiced in Israeli jails and detention centers against Palestinian prisoners and detainees, as well as other prisoners." However, Davis also notes that after the Supreme Court ruling, the Public Committee Against Torture in Israel found that "torture has, in most cases, ceased."

In 2000, an official Israeli report acknowledged torture of detainees during the First Intifada. The report said that the leadership of Shin Bet knew about the torture but did nothing to stop it. Human rights organisations claim some detainees died or were left paralysed.

A 2023 report by Save the Children found widespread use of physical, emotional, and sexual abuse against Palestinian children in Israeli military detention. The report found that among detained children, 86% were beaten, 69% were strip searched, 60% spent time in solitary confinement, 68% were denied any healthcare, and 58% were denied visits or communication with family.

Amnesty International reported the use of torture against Palestinian prisoners during the Gaza war, with at least four prisoners dying in Israeli custody since the war began.

Al Jazeera reported in February 2026 that Israel had transferred 54 Palestinian bodies and human remains to families in Gaza via the International Committee of the Red Cross, without any identifying information. Some of the bodies were mutilated and displayed evidence of torture, the report said.

In November 2026, the Palestinian Prisoners Media Office reported that female Palestinian prisoners at Israel's Damon Prison were forced to remove their hijabs for photographs, and that some were beaten after refusing to comply.

=== Curtailing of visitation rights ===
In 2007, Israel prevented families from Gaza to visit their relatives after the capture of the Israeli soldier Gilad Shalit. The restrictions increased after armed groups in Gaza kidnapped the bodies of two Israeli soldiers killed during the 2014 Gaza conflict.

=== Using Crocodiles to Guard Palestinian Inmates ===
Israeli Environment Minister Edith Silman has changed the classification of crocodiles from "wild animal" to "cultivated wild animal," a decision that might enable their use for security measures. Itamar Ben-Governor, the far-right Minister of National Security, has suggested employing crocodiles in moats surrounding Israeli prisons. One example is the Ketziot prison in southern Israel, which primarily holds Palestinian security detainees.

== Education programs ==
In 1967, Palestinian prisoners were initially denied pencils and paper. In the wake of prisoner protests, access was granted to pens, pencils, paper, books, newspapers and monitored radio broadcasting. Libraries were established in every prison, and literacy and language courses were organized. Young prisoners were offered classes to prepare for the General Secondary Examination. Thousands of Palestinian prisoners have learned Hebrew in Israeli prisons.

In the 1980s, according to Maya Rosenfeld, the option of armed resistance was completely blocked and prisons became a "sanctuary". Her research among Palestinian refugees in the Dheisheh camp in Bethlehem found that the politicization process of young men from the camp underwent a qualitative transformation during their period of imprisonment, which she attributes to the internal organization practices of Palestinian prisoners and the central role of studies and education.

Eventually, Palestinian prisoners were allowed to take online courses from the Open University of Israel and to complete academic degrees. Under the program, education for the prisoners was free, with prison authorities paying their university tuition. In 2009, there were 250 Palestinian prisoners studying at Israel's Open University.

In June 2011, Prime Minister Benjamin Netanyahu announced, in response to a halt in the peace talks, that Palestinian prisoners would no longer be granted the right to pursue academic degrees in prison. In late 2012, three prisoners appealed the decision the Israeli Supreme Court, which rejected their appeal. In their ruling, the judges stated that the right to free university education does not apply to those convicted of terror offenses. The ruling did, however, call on prison authorities to be "considerate" in deciding the cases of prisoners already in the midst of academic programs.

== Hunger strikes ==
In September 1992, Palestinian prisoners went on a hunger strike for 15 days. In 1995, Palestinians in Israeli custody conducted an 18-day hunger strike. By 1998, there were nine hunger strikes conducted by Palestinian prisoners in different prisons in Israel. On 1 May 2000, almost 1,000 of the 1,650 Palestinian prisoners being held in Israeli prisons at the time participated in a month-long hunger strike, in protest against "arbitrary treatment by prison officials, substandard prison conditions, prohibitions on family visits, use of solitary confinement, poor medical care, and Israel's refusal to release all the categories of prisoners specified in its agreements with the Palestine Liberation Organization (PLO)." Mass demonstrations in solidarity with the prisoners erupted throughout the areas of Palestinian self-rule in the days following, culminating in a mass protest on 15 May (the anniversary of the Nakba) and ending on 18 May, with 7 Palestinians killed and 1,000 injured. In addition, 60 Israelis were also wounded. The hunger strike was ended on 31 May after Israeli prison authorities promised to review the complaints and ease restrictions on visitations. A report by the Israeli government released in June 2001 on conditions in the Shatta prison noted that the living conditions were "particularly harsh" in the wing where prisoners from the Occupied Palestinian Territories were held, and concluded that the exposed tents and filthy bathrooms in which prisoners were housed and bathed were unfit for human use.

In February 2017, Mohammed al-Qiq, a Palestinian journalist in an Israeli prison threatened an open hunger strike against administrative detention upon his re-arrest which the Israel Security Agency stated was for "terror activity" for the Islamist group Hamas. He was released from prison in May 2016 after a 94-day hunger strike and re-arrested in mid-January after participating in a protest on the West Bank demanding the release of bodies of Palestinian militants. Al-Qiq was one of a number of prominent Palestinian hunger strikers in 2016, who included the Balboul brothers who went without food for 77 and 79 days, Malik al-Qadi for 68 days, Bilal Kayid for 71 days.

=== 2012 mass hunger strikes ===
Following his arrest on 17 December 2011, Khader Adnan, alleged by Israel to be a leader of the Palestinian Islamic Jihad, began a hunger strike in protest at what he claims were the violent circumstances of his arrest. Hundreds of Palestinians in Israeli prisons reportedly joined Adnan in his hunger strike as an act of solidarity. In April 2012, he was released after fasting for 66 days.

In February 2012, approximately 1,800 Palestinian prisoners held in Israeli prisons began a mass hunger strike in protest at the practice of administrative detention. Israel holds about 4,500 Palestinian prisoners, of which about 310 are being held in administrative detention, without the right to a trial. Four of the hunger strikers spent over two months without food. The demands of the hunger strikers included the right to family visits for prisoners from Gaza, the end of the use of extended solitary confinement and the release of those held under the administrative detention laws. Demonstrations in support of the prisoners were held in Nazareth, Umm al-Fahm, Kfar Kanna and Haifa.

On 7 May 2012, the Israeli Supreme Court rejected the appeals on human rights grounds of two of the prisoners, Tha'er Halahlah and Bilal Diab. A few days later, United Nations Secretary-General Ban Ki-moon and the International Committee of the Red Cross both expressed concern about the condition of the hunger strikers.

On 14 May, it was announced that the prisoners had agreed to end their hunger strike, having reached a deal with the Israeli authorities, brokered by Egypt and Jordan and following a formal request from Mahmoud Abbas. Under the deal, Israel agreed to limit administrative detention to six months, except in cases where new evidence against a suspect had emerged, to increase access to family visits and to return prisoners in solitary confinement to normal cells. There was also an agreement to open further discussions on improving prison conditions and representatives of the hunger strikers agreed not to engage in militant activity, including recruitment, within prisons. Hanan Ashrawi of the Palestinian National Council stated the hunger strikers had "truly demonstrated that non-violent resistance is an essential tool in our struggle for freedom".

=== Detention of Hisham Abu Hawash ===
In August 2021, Hisham Abu Hawash, a 40-year-old construction worker and father of five from Dura, began a hunger strike in protest of his detention, as he had been held without charges or evidence against him since October 2020. An alleged member of Islamic Jihad, Abu Hawash had previously been arrested and plead guilty to terrorism offences. Israel justified his detention on the grounds that doing so was necessary in foiling potential attacks and to avoid outing intelligence sources. Abu Hawash denies being a member of Islamic Jihad. Thousands campaigned for his release on social media, and the West Bank and Gaza saw protests in the form of street rallies.

In January 2022, his lawyer, Jawad Boulos, announced that the detainee had agreed to end the 141-day strike, which was believed to be the longest hunger strike held by a Palestinian prisoner since Samer Issawi's hunger strike in 2013 after a compromise was reached between Israeli and Palestinian Authority (PA) officials to have him released him on 26 February 2022, when the second renewable six-month term of his detention would end. Palestinian officials agreed they'd ensure Abu Hawash would not be involved in any terrorist activities. The deal was mediated by Egyptian officials. During his hunger strike, Abu Hawash had also refused medical care. A medical team from the International Committee of the Red Cross visited the prisoner in early January and warned that he was in critical condition and could face irreversible health consequences or even death. He is to remain in the hospital until his release.

== Political and social activism ==
According to Yezid Sayigh, an "inadvertent consequence" of Israel's internal security measures was to contribute to the social mobilization of Palestinian society. Due to a large number of students and youth in prison from the mid-1970s to early 1980s, the prison population "tended to be young, educated, and familiar with the tactics of civil disobedience and unarmed protest." In prison, they were exposed to political indoctrination and instruction in security and organization from veteran guerillas. Prisoners organized themselves according to political affiliation and initiated educational programs, making the prisons "unsurpassed 'cadre schools'". Upon their release, they became leaders of students movements in Palestinian universities and colleges. An Israeli investigation among Palestinian prisoners in the early stages of the First Intifada found that their political mobilization was not so much ideologically based, as it was a function of repeated humiliations at the hands of Israeli forces.

=== Palestinian Prisoners' Document ===
Five Palestinian prisoners being held in Israeli jails, affiliated with Fatah, Hamas, Islamic Jihad, the Popular Front for the Liberation of Palestine (PFLP), and the Democratic Front for the Liberation of Palestine (DFLP), authored the Palestinian Prisoners' Document in 2006. The document outlined 18 points on the basis of which negotiations with Israel should proceed.

=== Palestinian Prisoners Club ===
The Palestinian Prisoners Club is an independent, non-governmental, Palestinian organization which was established in 1993 with around 1,600 members of former Palestinian prisoners who were at least a year in an Israeli jail. The purpose of the club is to assist and support the thousands of Palestinian prisoners in Israeli jails. The club operates in variety of ways, ranging from legal aid, political action for the release of the prisoners, to aid to the families of prisoners. Abdulal al-Anani is the president of the club, and Abdullah Zghari is the club's executive director. However, since at least 2011, Qadura Fares has been consistently referred to as the "head" of the Palestinian Prisoners Club, so it is unclear exactly what position Fares actually holds.

=== Mohammed Abu Sakha ===
In March 2016, Amnesty International launched a campaign to free a Palestinian circus trainer Mohammed Abu Sakha, who was held without a charge or trial since his arrest in December 2015. Shin Bet claimed that the reason for the detention is that Sakha is a member of a terrorist organisation. The main purposes of the campaign were to put pressure on Israel and to highlight the cases of over 600 other prisoners in similar situation. The call was answered with protests being held around the world.

Sakha was eventually released on 30 August 2017, after being held for almost two years.

=== Bushra al-Tawil ===
Bushra al-Tawil is a Palestinian journalist, former Palestinian prisoner and prisoners' rights activist from Ramallah who has frequently been held under administrative detention without charge by Israel. She is the spokesperson for the Aneen Al-Qaid Media Network, a local news agency specialized in covering news about the Palestinian detainees, and political prisoners.

Al-Tawil was arrested in 2011 at the age of 18 by Israeli authorities and sentenced to 16 months in prison but freed five months later as part of the Gilad Shalit prisoner exchange. On 1 July 2014 she was rearrested and had her former sentence reimposed by a military court, she served the remainder eleven months in prison. She was released in May 2015. On 1 November 2017 she was again arrested and on 7 November ordered to administrative detention, incarceration without trial or charge. She spent eight months in prison. On 11 December 2019, she was again arrested again, after Israeli soldiers raided the Umm Al-Sharayet neighbourhood in al-Bireh. The arrest came less than a week after the release of her father, who had been held in administrative detention for two years. She was sentenced to administrative detention on 16 December, for which she was held in the Hasharon prison in northern Israel. She was most recently arrested on 22 March 2022, in Nablus.

== See also ==
- Camp 1391
- Arrest and detention of Palestinian minors by Israel
- Sde Teiman detention camp
- Ktzi'ot Prison
- Lebanese prisoners in Israel
- Ofer Prison
- Revolving door policy (Palestinian Authority)
- Mass detentions in the Gaza war
- Palestinian citizens of Israel
- Palestinian political violence
- Irgun and Lehi internment in Africa

== Sources ==
- Amnesty International (Summer 1978). "Amnesty International Administrative Detention in Israel/Occupied Territories". Middle East Journal. 32 (3): 337–339. JSTOR 4325772.
- "Urgent Action: Administrative Detention Renewed" (PDF). Amnesty International. 2018a.
- "Israel and Occupied Palestinian Territories" (PDF). Amnesty International Report 2017/18: The State of the World's Human Rights. Amnesty International. 2018b. pp. 207–211. ISBN 978-0-86210-499-3.
- Ehrenreich, Ben (2016). The Way to the Spring: Life and Death in Palestine. Granta Books. ISBN 978-1-783-78312-0.
- Falk, Richard (Winter 2002). "Azmi Bishara, the Right of Resistance, and the Palestinian Ordeal". Journal of Palestine Studies. 31 (2): 19–33. doi:10.1525/jps.2002.31.2.19. JSTOR 10.1525/jps.2002.31.2.19.
- Hajjar, Lisa (2005). Courting Conflict: The Israeli Military Court System in the West Bank and Gaza. University of California Press. ISBN 978-0-520-24194-7.
- Hoffnung, Menachem; Weinshall–Margel, Keren (2010). "Judicial Rejection as Substantial Relief: The Israeli Supreme Court and the "War on Terror"". In Volcansek, Mary L.; Stack, John F. (eds.). Courts and Terrorism: Nine Nations Balance Rights and Security. Cambridge University Press. pp. 150–167. ISBN 978-1-139-49537-0.
- Goldstein, Michael (Winter 1978). "Israeli Security Measures in the Occupied Territories: Administrative Detention". Middle East Journal. 32 (1): 35–44. JSTOR 4325711.
- Makdisi, Saree (2010). Palestine Inside Out: An Everyday Occupation. W. W. Norton & Company. ISBN 978-0-393-06996-9. Archived from the original on 3 March 2023.
- Pelleg-Sryck, Tamar (2011). "The Mysteries of Administrative Detention". In Baker, Abeer; Matar, Anat (eds.). Threat: Palestinian Political Prisoners in Israel. Pluto Press. pp. 123–135. ISBN 978-0-745-33021-1.
- Playfair, Emma (Fall 1988). "Israel's Security Needs in the West Bank, Real and Contrived". Arab Studies Quarterly. 10 (4): 406–423. JSTOR 41857980.
- Punamäki, Raija-Leena (Summer 1988). "Experiences of Torture, Means of Coping, and Level of Symptoms among PalestinianPolitical Prisoners". Journal of Palestine Studies. 17 (4): 81–96. doi:10.2307/2537292. JSTOR 2537292.
