= May 2023 Gaza–Israel clashes =

2023 Israeli military operation

- Part of the Gaza–Israel conflict
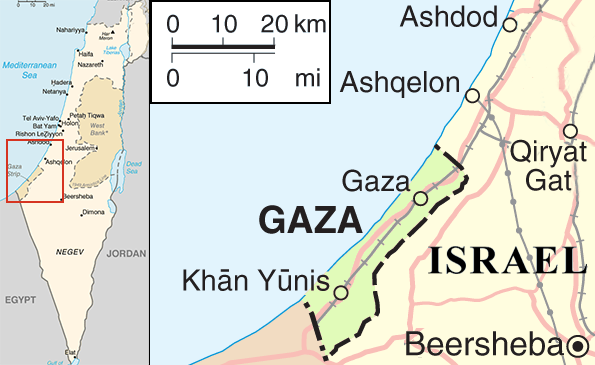
Date	9–13 May 2023 (4 days)
Location	Gaza Strip; Israel
Result	Ceasefire as of 13 May at 10 p.m. (19:00 GMT).

Involved parties
Israel	Palestinian Islamic Jihad Popular Front for the Liberation of Palestine

Commanders and leaders
(Israel) Benjamin Netanyahu; (Israel) Yoav Gallant; (Israel) Herzi Halevi; (Israel) Ronen Bar	(Palestinian Islamic Jihad) Ziyad al-Nakhalah; (Palestinian Islamic Jihad) Akram al-Ajouri

Casualties and losses
Total killed: 1 civilian Total wounded: 32	Total killed: 33; Civilians: 14 (4 by friendly fire according to Israel); Total wounded: 147+ Detained: 35 Displaced: 800+
- 1 Palestinian worker in Israel killed

The clashes between Israel and Palestinian Islamic Jihad in May 2023 started on 2 May 2023 when Khader Adnan, a former Palestinian Islamic Jihad (PIJ) spokesman, died in an Israeli prison following an 87-day hunger strike protesting his continual administrative detention and PIJ militants fired around 102 rockets towards southern Israel, injuring seven individuals in Sderot. On 9 May 2023, Israel conducted a series of airstrikes on the Gaza Strip, called Operation Shield and Arrow (Hebrew: מבצע מגן וחץ) that lasted until 13 May.

Israel responded to the rocket attacks on 9 May with the targeted assassination of three leaders of the PIJ movement, an attack that also killed 10 civilians. Subsequently, on the same day, Israel killed two Palestinians in an airstrike against a vehicle in Khan Yunis, and six more in airstrikes on 10 May. In retaliation, militants launched a barrage of rockets into Israel, totaling over 938 as per the Israel Defense Forces (IDF), under the banner of Operation Revenge of the Free (Arabic: عملية ثأر الأحرار). The Popular Front for the Liberation of Palestine (PFLP) accounted for four of the fatalities on 10 May. On 11 May, Israeli airstrikes killed two more PIJ commanders, and at least 26 in prior raids. The exchange of rockets and airstrikes persisted on 12 May amidst ongoing efforts to broker a ceasefire. On this day, another senior PIJ leader along with his aide were killed, bringing the total death toll to 34 Palestinians (inclusive of one in Israel) and one Israeli. On the following day, Israel and Islamic Jihad agreed to a ceasefire.

== Background ==
On 2 May 2023, Khader Adnan, a former PIJ spokesman, died in an Israeli prison after an 87-day hunger strike against his repeated administrative detentions. In response, later that same day, militants from the Palestinian Islamic Jihad organization launched approximately 102 rockets towards Sderot, communities in the Gaza periphery, and southern Israel. In one of these attacks, seven people in Sderot were injured.

For a week, Israel refrained from responding to the rocket fire from the Gaza Strip until 9 May when the operation commenced, breaking a ceasefire that had previously been agreed to between Israel and Palestinian groups on 3 May following a smaller flare-up in violence after the death of Adnan.

According to Al-Nakhalah after the ceasefire Israeli military pledged to stop assassinating commanders.

== Bombing ==
Forty military aircraft carried out a surprise bombing in violation of a ceasefire that had been implemented to quell the exchange of fire across the border. The bombing commenced at 2 am local time on 9 May 2023 and lasted for approximately two hours. Witnesses reported that the attack targeted a top-floor apartment in Gaza City and a house in Rafah. The Palestinian health ministry confirmed the deaths of 13 individuals as a result of the bombing. Among the casualties were three commanders, their wives, several children, and other bystanders. Additionally, 20 people sustained injuries during the airstrikes.

The Russian consulate in Ramallah issued a report stating that a Russian citizen, who worked as a dentist and resided locally, was among those killed. The dentist's wife and son also lost their lives. Later on, in Khan Yunis, two Palestinians were killed in an airstrike targeting a vehicle. This incident occurred several hours after the initial bombing.

The Israeli Home Front Command instructed residents within 40 km (25 mi) of Gaza to stay near bomb shelters as a reprisal was expected.

== Return rocket fire and ensuing violence ==
Palestinian militants responded to the bombing by launching hundreds of rockets into Israel, over 938 according to the IDF, in what Palestinian militants called Operation Revenge of the Free. On 11 May, two more PIJ commanders were killed during airstrikes, while the death toll from the previous raids increased to at least 26. Four members of the PFLP were identified among those killed in the 10 May airstrikes. On 12 May, PIJ militants fired rockets toward Jerusalem for the first time during the conflict. As a result, ceasefire talks were paused.

On 13 May, a Palestinian worker was killed and another injured by rocket shrapnel in Negev. Late that day, a ceasefire between Israel and PIJ was arranged through the auspices of the government of Egypt, which negotiated with both parties. Reports about the details of the ceasefire conditions are so far contradictory.

== Reactions ==
Ismail Haniyeh, the head of Hamas, denounced the airstrikes and said, "Assassinating the leadership in a treacherous operation will not bring security to the occupier, but instead greater resistance." Hamas spokesman Hazem Qassem issued a warning, claiming that Israel "bears responsibility for the repercussions of this escalation."

The United Nations has called for moderation and a restart of talks aimed at achieving a durable peace as part of the international community's concern. Israeli authorities have suspended the entry and departure of people and commodities from Gaza through two crossing points until further notice.

On 13 May, hundreds of peace activists joined two anti-war demonstrations in Tel Aviv and Haifa to protest against Israel's actions in Gaza, holding up Palestinian flags and banners in Arabic, English and Hebrew that read, "Stop the war on Gaza", "Our hearts are with Gaza", "No democracy with the occupation", "Palestinian lives matter" and "No to the aggression on Gaza."

On 13 June, Amnesty International said the Israeli airstrikes and Palestinian rocket fire could amount to war crimes, saying that the airstrikes were carried out "without military necessity" and amounted to "a form of collective punishment against the civilian population" and the rocket fire "indiscriminate".

== Commander assassinations ==
The Israeli's stated objective of the operation was a targeted campaign against senior members of the Islamic Jihad in Gaza who posed a significant threat to security stability. Throughout the operation, six senior Palestinian Islamic Jihad figures were killed in targeted strikes, including Jihad Shaker al-Ghannam, Iyad Al-Husni, Ahmad Abu Daqqa, Khalil Bathini and Tariq Ezzdine.

== Ceasefire ==
Israel and Islamic Jihad agreed to a ceasefire mediated by Egypt on 13 May 2023.

== See also ==
- Outline of the Gaza war
- Timeline of the Israeli–Palestinian conflict in 2023
- Casualties of Israeli attacks on the Gaza Strip
- Palestinian rocket attacks on Israel
