= Hana Shalabi =

Palestinian activist

- هناء شلبي
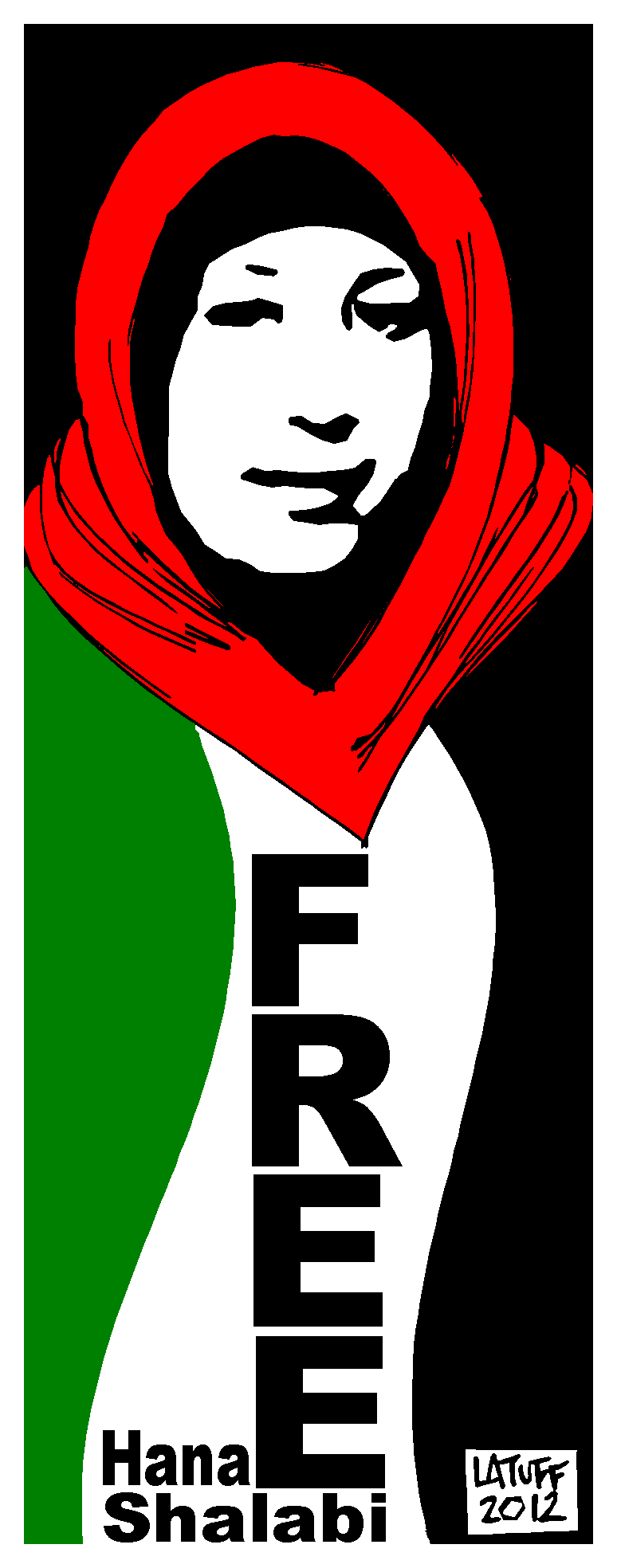
- Born: 2 July 1983 (age 43)

Hana Shalabi (Arabic: هناء يحيى شلبي; born 2 July 1982) is a Palestinian prisoner in Israel, held in administrative detention.

On 16 February 2012, the Israeli military arrested Shalabi at her home in Jenin, in the Palestinian administered territories of the West Bank. The BBC stated she was "reportedly a supporter of Islamic Jihad", however, her father denied she was a member of the organisation. The Israeli prison authority said she was taken into custody for unspecified terror activity. To protest against being held without charge, she began her hunger strike. She ended her hunger 43-day hunger strike on 29 March after a deal with Israel in which she is to be deported to the Gaza Strip and stay there for three years.

Many protests were held within the Palestinian territories in solidarity with Shalabi, and her arrest was condemned by the Palestinian leadership. Shalabi had also been detained previously in 2009 and released two years later in October, 2011 during the Gilad Shalit prisoner exchange between Israel and Hamas.

== Life ==
Shalabi is from the village of Burqin near Jenin in the northern West Bank, although her family originates from Haifa. Her brother was killed by the Israeli Army in 2005.

In September 2009, she was arrested by Israeli authorities. No charges were brought against her. She remained in continuous detention for 25 months before being released in the prisoner swap deal between Hamas and Israel in October 2011. After her release Shalabi planned on studying nursing at al-Rawda College in Nablus.

She is reportedly a supporter of the Palestinian Islamic Jihad (PIJ), an organization that violently opposes the existence of Israel, and which Israel considers to be a terrorist organization, and is designated as a "Foreign Terrorist Organization" by the United States Department of State. Hana Shalabi's father denies that she is active in the organization.

== Arrest and hunger strike ==
On 16 February 2012, Israeli forces arrested Hana Shalabi from her home in Jenin. During the raid, Israeli soldiers assaulted her and ransacked their home, according to Hana's father. Upon detention, Shalabi said she was subjected to an embarrassing body search by a male soldier.

Shalabi was issued a six-month administrative detention order on 23 February. She was neither charged with a crime, nor given a trial. An Israeli Army spokesman commented that Shalabi was "a global jihad-affiliated operative" that "posed a threat to the area" and that she assaulted the soldiers who arrested her. Shalabi immediately began a hunger strike to protest her arrest and detention. Her father, Yahya, stated Shalabi was emulating prisoner Khader Adnan, who ended his 66-day hunger strike on 21 February 2012. She is one of five Palestinians to have been rearrested after being released in the Hamas-Israel prisoner swap. During the first week of her arrest, Shalabi said she was beaten, abused, blindfolded and placed in solitary confinement, according to her attorney.

In March, Shalabi said she was approached by an officer who asked her to remove her clothes so he could search her. Shalabi said "When I refused, he called other officers who tied me up and started beating me."

On 20 March, Physicians for Human Rights-Israel (PHR-IL) stated Shalabi was in "immediate risk of death." PHR Executive Director Ran Cohen said she had lost 14 kilograms (31 lbs) since the hunger strike began and that she was in massive pain. The PHR-Israel along with other human rights groups have questioned the "adequacy and timeliness" of her treatment by the Israeli prison authorities concerning her health conditions. The Israeli Prison Service has stated Shalabi is currently receiving treatment at the prison clinic, but the PHR has called for her to be transferred to a hospital. Via her lawyer Jawad Bolous, Shalabi stated "It's true our lives are very precious, but our freedom is even more precious and more powerful than their cells."

== Protests against her detention ==
Palestinian protesters held a large demonstration march that began at al-Bireh and ended near the Muqata'ah in Ramallah. Another demonstration was held on March 29, in Gaza, calling for her release. Demonstrations for Shalabi were also reported in Ramallah.

Palestinian Prime Minister Salam Fayyad said Shalabi is "fighting for her dignity." The Minister of Prisoner Affairs for the Palestinian National Authority condemned Israel's treatment of Shalabi while the head of the Palestinian Prisoners' Society Qadura Fares beckoned the international community to help end her administrative detention.

The human rights organization Amnesty International demanded Israel either prosecute or release Shalabi, citing her "risk of death."

== Exile deal ==
Shalabi ended her hunger strike in a deal that would see her exiled to the Gaza Strip for three years in return for the termination of her administrative detention. According to Ma'an News Agency, the deal did not involve the Palestinian National Authority and was between Shalabi and Israel. Her lawyer Jawad Bolous confirmed the deal. The PIJ was also uninvolved with spokesperson Daud Shihab claiming it was unaware of the arrangements and that it opposed exile as a general policy. Qadura Fares of the Palestinian Prisoners' Society stated the group was against deportation but the decision was ultimately with Shalabi.

Amnesty International said the deal could amount to forcible deportation, which is contrary to the Geneva Conventions.

== See also ==
- Khader Adnan
- Abdulhadi Alkhawaja
- Maikel Nabil Sanad
- Bobby Sands, of the 1981 Irish hunger strike
- Muhammad al-Qieq
