= Revolving door (disambiguation) =

A revolving door is a type of building entrance.

Revolving door(s) may also refer to:

- Revolving Door (advertisement), a negative television commercial made for the 1988 US presidential campaign
- "Revolving Door" (Crazy Town song), from The Gift of Game, 2001
- "Revolving Door" (Tate McRae song), from So Close to What, 2025
- The Revolving Door, a 1968 documentary film
- The Revolving Doors, a 1988 Canadian-French French-language drama film
- Revolving door (politics), the cycling of employees between an industry and government agencies that influence that industry, notably the U.S. Congress
- Recidivism, any recurring contact of a person with the criminal justice system
- "Revolving Doors" (song), by British alternative band Gorillaz from The Fall, 2011
- Revolving Doors (charity), a charitable organisation in the United Kingdom
- "Revolving Doors", a storyline in the science fiction comedy webtoon series Live with Yourself!

== See also ==
- Pulk/Pull Revolving Doors, a 2001 song by Radiohead from Amnesiac
- Revolving door policy (Palestinian Authority), alleged by Great Britain, Israel, and the US to be a policy of the Palestinian National Authority
