= List of strikes in Palestine =

Throughout the history of Palestine, a number of strikes, labour disputes, student strikes, hunger strikes, and other industrial actions have occurred.

== Background ==
A labour strike is a work stoppage caused by the mass refusal of employees to work. This can include wildcat strikes, which are done without union authorisation, and slowdown strikes, where workers reduce their productivity while still carrying out minimal working duties. It is usually a response to employee grievances, such as low pay or poor working conditions. Strikes can also occur to demonstrate solidarity with workers in other workplaces or pressure governments to change policies.

== 20th century ==
=== 1930s ===
- 1933 Palestine riots
- Arab general strike, in 1936, part of the 1936–1939 Arab revolt in Palestine.

=== 1940s ===
- 1946 Palestine general strike
- 1947 Jerusalem riots

=== 1960s ===
- February 1969 Palestinian youth protests, series of protests including strikes and school strikes, led by youth in Palestine following a riot by schoolgirls in the Gaza Strip that clashed with Israeli troops.

=== 1970s ===
- August 1971 Gaza general strike, general strike in the Gaza Strip against Israeli bulldozing of homes in Gaza.
- First annual general strike in Palestine to mark Land Day in March 1976.
- 1976 Israeli VAT protests, protests including strikes in Israel against introduction of value added tax and in Palestine against imposition of the tax in the Occupied Palestinian Territories.

=== 1980s ===
- March 1980 West Bank general strike, in protest against the Israeli government's move to allow Israeli settlement in the city of Hebron.
- June 1980 West Bank general strike, in protest against a Jewish Underground bombing that injured Mayor of Nablus Bassam Shakaa and Mayor Ramallah Karim Khalaf.
- 1980–81 West Bank teachers strike, by Israeli-employed Palestinian teachers in the West Bank demanding pay raises to match their salaries with the salaries of teachers in Israel.
- 1981 Birzeit University strike, strike by students at Birzeit University in the West Bank in protest against Israeli forces' harassment of students.
- December 1981 Gaza general strike, general strike in the Gaza Strip in response to Israeli plans to re-organise the Military Governorate overseeing the occupation.
- March 1982 West Bank general strike, general strike in the West Bank following the Israeli occupation government's dismissal of elected Palestinian nationalist mayors in the West Bank.
- One-day general strike in April 1982 across 15 Muslim-majority countries called by King Khalid of Saudi Arabia after an Israeli army reservist killed two in an attack on the Dome of the Rock.
- 1982 Bethlehem University strike, by students at Bethlehem University in the West Bank following the Israeli military's move to deport eight British and American teachers who refused to sign pledges saying they would not "give any services directly or indirectly which will help or support the so-called Palestine Liberation Organization or any other hostile organization."
- 1984 Palestinian prisoners' hunger strike, 10-day hunger strike by Palestinians imprisoned by Israel in Al-Junaid Prison in Nablus over prison conditions.
- 1986 Birzeit University strike, 2-month strike by Birzeit University faculty over wage cuts.
- December 1986 West Bank general strike, general strike in the West Bank after two Birzeit University students were killed by Israeli forces while protesting a roadblock on campus.
- February 1987 Palestinian unrest, including strikes, after Israeli soldiers used live ammunition to disperse a demonstration held at the Balata Camp.
- First Intifada, including strikes, against the Israeli occupation of Palestine.
- Beit Sahour tax strike, tax strike by Beit Sahour residents in 1988 and 1989, part of the First Intifada.

=== 1990s ===
- 1992 Palestinian prisoners' hunger strike, hunger strike by Palestinians imprisoned by Israel demanding improved prison conditions.
- 1995 Palestinian prisoners' hunger strike, hunger strike by Palestinians imprisoned by Israel demanding the release of political prisoners.
- March 1997 Palestinian general strike, general strike in Palestine over the Israeli government's approval of settlements on Jabal Abu Ghneim.
- 1997 Palestinian teachers' strike, 3-week strike over wages.

== 21st century ==
=== 2000s ===
- 2006 Palestinian teachers' strike, 2-month strike by teachers over unpaid wages.
- 2007 Gaza medical strike, strike by medical workers in the Gaza Strip following the Hamas takeover of the Gaza Strip.

=== 2010s ===
- 2011–2012 Palestinian protests, including strikes.
- 2013–14 UNRWA strike, over 2-month strike by UNRWA staff over wages.
- 2014 Zarfati Garage strike, strike by Palestinian workers at the Zarfati Garage in the Israeli settlement of Mishor Adumim over the right to unionise.
- 2017 Palestinian prisoners' hunger strike

=== 2020s ===
- 2023 Palestinian teachers strike;

== See also ==
- Economy of the State of Palestine
