= 1946 Palestine general strike =

1946 strike by Palestinians

The 1946 Palestine general strike was a general strike in Mandatory Palestine, then under British rule, in April 1946.

== Strike ==
On 9 April 1946, 500 postal workers in Tel Aviv and Jaffa walked out on strike. The striking workers were joined by other post workers elsewhere in Palestine the next day, and later that week, by railway workers, the first general rail-post strike in the history of Mandatory Palestine. Other civil servants in Palestine would also join the strike, bringing total participation to 23 000 workers. The colonial officials attempted to use soldiers to replace the striking workers.

Chief Secretary of the Mandate John Valentine Wistar Shaw met with the strike leaders for the first time on 18 April. The strike ended on 24 April, with an agreement to raise wages for junior employees and a war bonus being issued to the workers.

== Reactions ==
The strike was widely supported by communists in Mandatory Palestine. The Kol HaAm and Al-Ittihad newspapers both published articles urging on the strike. Writing for Socialist Appeal, Trotskyist Tony Cliff claimed that the strike disproved "the fable which imperialism, Zionism and the reactionary Arab leadership try to bolster up that unity of the Arab and Jewish masses is impossible to achieve."

The strike received international support from the International Association of Railway Employees and the World Federation of Trade Unions.

Judah Leon Magnes described the strike as "complete unity and solidarity between the thousands of striking Arab and Jewish government officers," saying that it was "but one example of what can come about if the declared sincere policy of the government will be Arab-Jewish cooperation." In mid-May 1946, speaking in the British House of Lords, Edward Grigg, 1st Baron Altrincham argued that Britain needed to "take heed of the warning which has been given" by the strike, saying that it was "the one thing which has entirely united British, Arabs and Jews, who acted together without any difficulty to establish their rights in this respect."

== See also ==
- 1946 in Mandatory Palestine
- List of strikes in Palestine
