= Muhammad al-Qiq =

Palestinian journalist

- محمد القيق
- Born: 21 April 1982 (age 44); Palestine
- Education: Master's degree in Contemporary Arab Studies, Birzeit University
- Occupations: Journalist, writer
- Television: Correspondent at Almajd TV Network
- Spouse: Fayha Shalash (journalist)
- Children: 2

Muhammad al-Qiq or Mohammed al-Qeeq (Arabic: محمد القيق) is a Palestinian journalist, correspondent and reporter for Saudi News Agency Almajd TV Network. Al-Qiq received international attention in 2015 when he began a hunger strike in protest of him being incarcerated under Israeli administrative detention (internment without trial or charge). He was released on May 19, 2016, after enduring a 94-day hunger strike.

Al-Qiq was detained again on January 16, 2017, and subsequently began a new hunger strike, ending in his release after 32 days.

Al-Qiq lives in Abu Qash in the Ramallah District in Palestine. He has a master's degree in Contemporary Arab Studies from Birzeit University.

== Arrest ==
At 2:00 am on 21 November 2015, al-Qiq was arrested at his home in Ramallah. The Israeli Security Agency Shin Bet said al-Qiq was arrested for "terror activity" for the Islamist group Hamas.

B'Tselem reported that the classified intelligence evidence viewed by the Israeli Supreme Court was judged significant and that the court therefore deemed the detention justified. Unusually, the Court's decision contained details of the reasons for Al-Qiq's detention; "Involvement in recent military activity, in the operations of Kutla Islamiya in Bir Zeit University, and military contact with operatives in the Gaza Strip." According to Amnesty, the stated reason for Al-Qiq's detention was "incitement," of working with media associated with Hamas and of being a "threat."

== Previous Arrests and Detentions ==
In 2003, Al-Qiq was imprisoned for a month; in 2004, he was imprisoned for 13 months for "Hamas-related activities"; and in 2008, he was "sentenced to 16 months on charges linked to his activities on the student council at the West Bank's Birzeit University."

== Hunger strike ==
On 17 December 2015, an administrative detention order was issued against him. Shortly after his arrest, al-Qiq launched a hunger strike in protest. Prison guards at HaEmek Medical Center hospital in Afula tied him to his bed, forcibly examined and treated him, and put an intravenous line in his arm to administer salts and minerals against his will.

=== Collapse ===
On 15 January 2016, al-Qiq collapsed and was transferred to an intensive care unit and forcibly treated again.

=== "Free or dead" ===
In an interview with Al Jazeera English on 1 February 2016, al-Qiq's wife, Fayha Shalash, said that her husband had signed a document refusing any medical treatment, even if he loses consciousness. "His decision is very clear: either free or dead, not in between," Shalash said.

Starting 10 January 2016, the hospital forcibly fed al-Qiq for four consecutive days. He was strapped to his bed, unable to get up for any reason, and fed intravenously.

=== Lost significant hearing ===
On 2 February 2016 it was reported that al-Qiq had lost significant hearing, though he was still conscious and refused any medical treatment.

=== Lost ability to speak ===
On 6 February 2016 (74th consecutive day) it was reported that al-Qiq has lost his ability to speak due to his frail health, and that he only communicates in writing. He has said he will continue his hunger strike until "martyrdom or freedom".

=== High Court "suspends" detention order ===
On Thursday 4 February, Israel's High Court of Justice "suspended" the detention order after al-Qiq's health deteriorated. Its conditions stipulated that al-Qiq must remain in hospital, and must seek permission from the Israeli authorities should he wish to receive treatment at another hospital. According to al-Qiq's lawyer, Jawad Boulus, the High Court said that the authorities would re-arrest al-Qiq should his health improve, and resume the detention order against him. The journalist vowed to continue his hunger strike until he is released or dead.

=== Refuses Israeli offer to be released in May ===
On Sunday 7 February 2016, al-Qiq refused an Israeli offer to be released in May. While still gravely ill and at risk of death, the hunger striker is insisting on an immediate end to his administrative detention. Pointing out an apparent inconsistency in the reasons given by Israel for detaining al-Qiq and the offer of release on 1 May, Amnesty International asked "If al-Qiq was detained for real and imperative reasons of security, how can the authorities know he will no longer pose a threat as of 1 May?"

=== High Court compromise proposal ===
On Monday, 15 February, Israeli High Court of Justice proposed the solution to transfer al-Qiq to Makassed Hospital in East Jerusalem. Justice Elyakim Rubinstein has denied al-Qiq's lawyer to transfer him to a hospital in Ramallah from the hospital in Afula where he is currently hospitalised.

== Political and diplomatic ==
The Chairman of the Committee for Detainees and Ex-detainees, Issa Qaraqe, said al-Qiq's health condition has deteriorated severely, and that he is in need of intensive care. He called on the international community to intervene and pressure Israel to release him, saying Al-Qiq insists on going free before he ends his hunger-strike.

== Humanitarian ==
In a statement issued on Tuesday 2 February 2016, the United Nations Coordinator for Humanitarian Assistance and Development Aid, Robert Piper, reiterated "the United Nations' long-standing position that all administrative detainees – Palestinian or Israeli – should be charged or released without delay".

On 8 February 2016, Amnesty International expressed further concern that al-Qiq is at imminent risk of death and remains effectively detained without charge or trial.

== Israeli public opinion ==
There are voices among Israeli public that call for government to stop practice of administrative detentions and either release such prisoners or put him on trial. The protests against the police and al-Qiq detention are being organized by Israeli Arab journalists and members of Knesset.

== Professional ==
On 14 January 2016, the International Federation of Journalists and its affiliate the Palestinian Journalists Syndicate expressed deep concern over al-Qiq's health and demanded his immediate release.

== See also ==
- Hana Shalabi
- Abdullah Barghouti
- Khader Adnan
