= Khader Adnan =

Palestinian political activist and prisoner (1978–2023)

- خضر عدنان
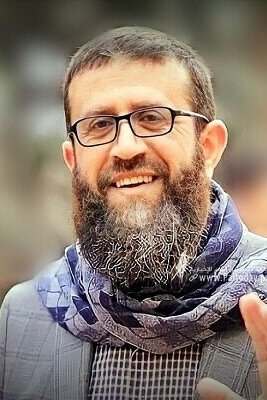
- Born: Khader Adnan Mohammad Musa; 24 March 1978; Arraba, Jenin, Israeli-occupied West Bank
- Died: 2 May 2023 (aged 45); Ayalon Prison, Ramla, Israel
- Cause of death: Starvation by hunger strike
- Organization: Palestinian Islamic Jihad (Until 2008)
- Known for: Hunger strikes against his administrative detention by Israel
- Children: 9

Khader Adnan Mohammad Musa (Arabic: خضر عدنان محمد موسى, romanized: Khaḍr ʿAdnān Muḥammad Mūsā; 24 March 1978 – 2 May 2023) was a Palestinian activist and prisoner in Israel who died after an 87-day hunger strike in protest of his detention without trial. By the time of his death, he had been arrested 12 times by Israel. He became prominent as a figure after a 66-day hunger strike in 2011 that led to a mass hunger strike among Palestinian prisoners and his ultimate release.

In the early 2000s, Adnan was a spokesman for the Palestinian Islamic Jihad (PIJ), a group that militantly opposes Israel, and Adnan was convicted for his role with the group. In 2012, his wife claimed that he had not been involved with PIJ for four years, and never had any role in militant activities.

In December 2011, Adnan was arrested and held under administrative detention, and the following day, to protest the conditions of his arrest, Israel's policy of administrative detention and its treatment of Palestinians under Israeli occupation, went on a hunger strike. Whilst mass hunger strikes had previously been carried out by groups of Palestinian prisoners, Adnan became the first to go on an individual hunger strike. According to Adnan, an International Committee of the Red Cross visit was canceled after Israeli officers insisted on being present and that Adnan remain tied to his bed. On 21 February 2012, Israel agreed to release Adnan on 17 April 2012, and he agreed to immediately end his hunger strike at 66 days, then the longest in Palestinian history.

Adnan was detained for the final time on 5 February 2023, and immediately began what was to become his longest hunger strike. Israeli journalist Amira Hass wrote that his intent was "to expose the basic injustice in Israel’s military justice system and its casual denial of basic freedoms". He died in prison on 2 May, having spent approximately eight cumulative years in Israeli detention.

== Early life and family ==
Khader Adnan was from Arraba, near Jenin in the West Bank, where he owned a bakery and produce store. A baker by trade, he held an undergraduate degree in mathematics from Birzeit University. In 1996, as a student, he became involved with the Islamic Jihad Movement in Palestine (PIJ), eventually serving as a spokesman for the group.

Adnan married his wife Randa Adnan in 2005, by which time he had been detained five times for his affiliation with PIJ. He told her before they married that, "his life was not normal, that he might be around for 15 days and then be gone again for a long time. But I always dreamt of marrying someone strong, someone who struggles in defense of his country."

Randa had given birth to two daughters and a son by 2012, and in late 2013 gave birth to triplets. As of 2021, Adnan had a total of nine children.

== Early detentions, 1999–2010 ==
Adnan was first arrested and detained by Israel in 1999, when he spent four months under Israeli administrative detention. He was arrested by the Palestinian National Authority (PNA) eight months after being released for leading a student demonstration against Lionel Jospin in 2000. At the demonstration, students threw eggs or stones at the former French Prime Minister during his visit to Birzeit to denounce his characterization of Hezbollah's military actions against the Israeli occupation as "terrorism." His first hunger strike, 10 days long, was undertaken during his detention by the PNA. He was arrested again in December 2002 by Israel and spent a year in administrative detention. Rearrested six months after his release, he was placed in solitary confinement and went on hunger strike for 28 days until the Israel Prison Service placed him with the general prison population.

In June 2005, after PIJ members were killed in a shootout with Israeli troops, Adnan "called on all Palestinian militant groups to resume fighting with Israel" and accused the governing entity, the PNA, of collaborating with Israel. In August 2005, Adnan was arrested and imprisoned by Israel for 15 months. According to Palestinian prisoners' support group Addameer, he held a 12-day hunger strike to protest his isolation in Kfar Yona in 2005. A YouTube video of a rally in 2007 shows him praising and encouraging suicide bombings: "Who among you will carry the next explosive belt? Who among you will fire the next bullets? Who among you will have his body parts blown all over?" He was held by Israel for another six months in administrative detention beginning in March 2008.

== 2011 detention and hunger strike ==
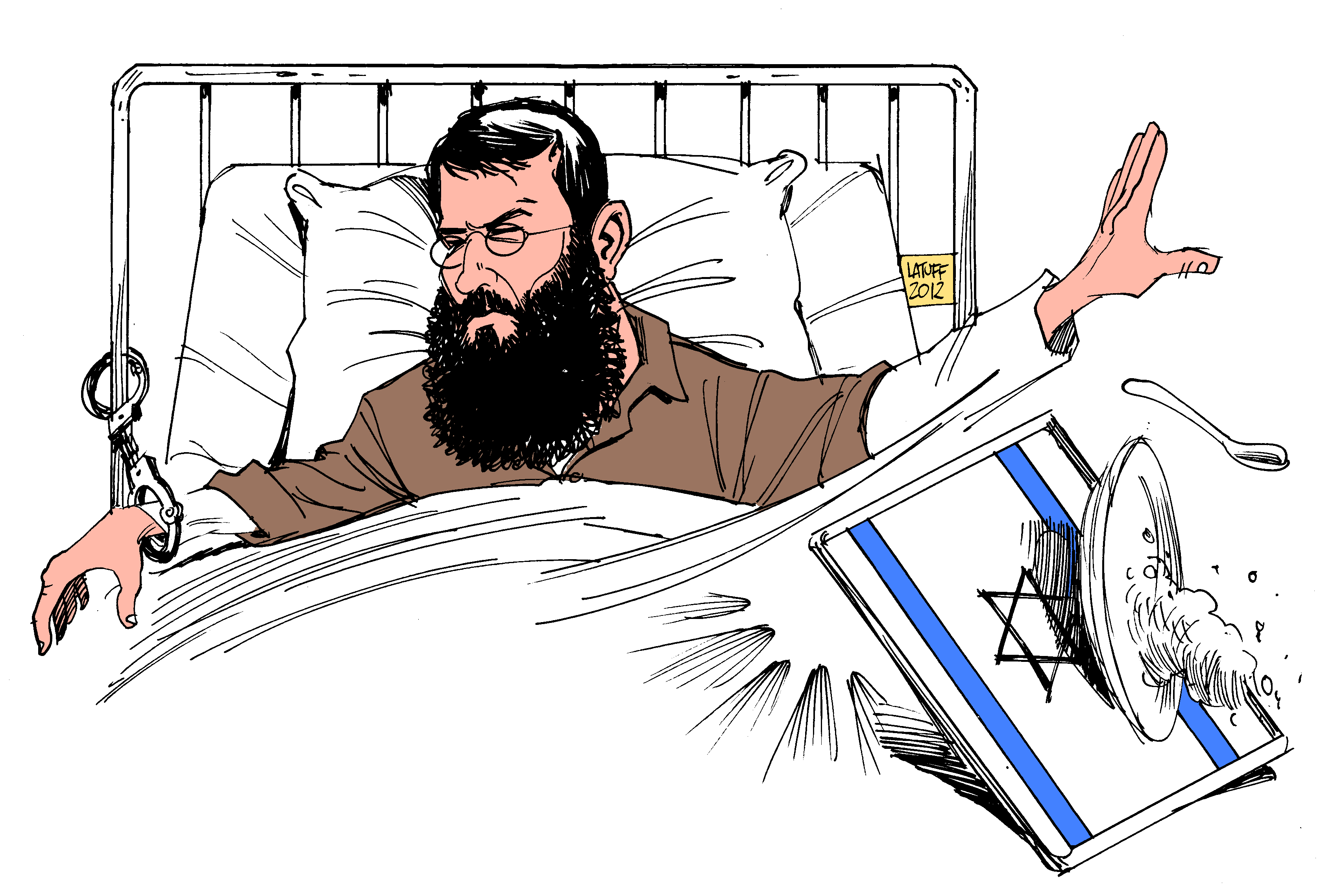
Adnan's 2011–2012 hunger strike as depicted in a 2012 cartoon by Carlos Latuff

At the time of his 2011 arrest, Adnan was no longer an active spokesman for the PIJ. Adnan had been convicted in the past by Israel for being a spokesperson for the PIJ, and media reports indicate he served as a PIJ spokesman. In 2012, Gulf News said he had served as a spokesman for the group since 2000, while The Guardian said he had acted as a spokesman for the PIJ in the past.

By this point, Adnan had been detained roughly 10 times since—seven times by Israel (including his last detention), and two or three times by the PNA. Addameer said Adnan had spent a total of six years in prison since 1999. Between his periods of incarceration Adnan continued to run his bakery in Arraba.

At the time of his detention, Adnan was studying for a master's degree in economics at Birzeit University. He also operated a bakery in Qabatya and a produce store in his hometown of Arraba in the West Bank. He was arrested by the Israeli Army on 17 December 2011 from their home in Arraba in the middle of the night. The next day, he began a hunger strike that ended 66 days later on 21 February 2012. In a letter he gave to his lawyers for public release, Adnan explained why he was on hunger strike:

The Israeli occupation has gone to extremes against our people, especially prisoners. I have been humiliated, beaten, and harassed by interrogators for no reason, and thus I swore to God I would fight the policy of administrative detention to which I and hundreds of my fellow prisoners fell prey … The only thing I can do is offer my soul to God, as I believe righteousness and justice will eventually triumph over tyranny and oppression. I hereby assert that I am confronting the occupiers not for my own sake as an individual, but for the sake of thousands of prisoners who are being deprived of their simplest human rights while the world and international community look on. It is time the international community and the UN support prisoners and force the State of Israel to respect international human rights and stop treating prisoners as if they were not humans.

Adnan was interrogated for 18 days following his arrest; he told his lawyers that during this time Israeli soldiers made sexual innuendos about his wife, mocked his Islamic faith, beat him, tied him to a chair in painful positions, ripped hair from his beard and wiped dirt on his face. Israeli authorities ignored these allegations. According to his wife and lawyers, Adnan's mistreatment continued and included lengthy periods of solitary confinement, multiple strip searches, and continuous abusive interrogation.

Adnan had "officially" been under administrative detention since 10 January 2012, a term that was set to last until 8 May at which point his detention could be renewed if the Israeli authorities deem it necessary. As of 31 December 2011, there were 307 Palestinians in administrative detention, including 21 members of the Palestinian Legislative Council, the parliament of the Palestinian Authority. Under the administrative detention procedure, the Israeli military can hold detainees for renewable six-month periods without charge if it deems them to be security threats. The decision to detain an individual is based on the evidence presented to military judges, but not the defendant or his lawyers, and is subject to judicial review.

Adnan had not been formally charged with any crime; Israel claimed that he was arrested "for activities that threaten regional security." BBC, CNN and Al Jazeera reported that Adnan was believed to be a leader of the PIJ in the West Bank. Bikya Masr reported he was a "senior leader of the Islamic Jihad organization" and according to Al-Ahram, He was a "leading figure in Islamic Jihad."

It is not known if Adnan was directly involved in attacks on Israelis; he had never been charged as such by Israel. His wife Randa denied Adnan had any leadership role in the PIJ, or any role in militant activities, and said he was a member of a Palestinian reconciliation committee. She told Yedioth Ahronoth in 2011 that, "It's true that he was the Islamic Jihad's spokesman during the intifada, but over the past four years he had nothing to do with it … He hadn't talked to anyone from the Islamic Jihad. He left that activity altogether."

Adnan was transferred to a hospital on 30 December but refused treatment from Israeli doctors. After meeting Adnan in the hospital, the organization Physicians for Human Rights – Israel, expressed "grave concern" and about his situation, which its doctors described as "critical." About 50 days into his hunger strike his wife was permitted to visit him, and stated he appeared emaciated and dirty and was shackled to his hospital bed.

=== Demonstrations and solidarity strikes ===
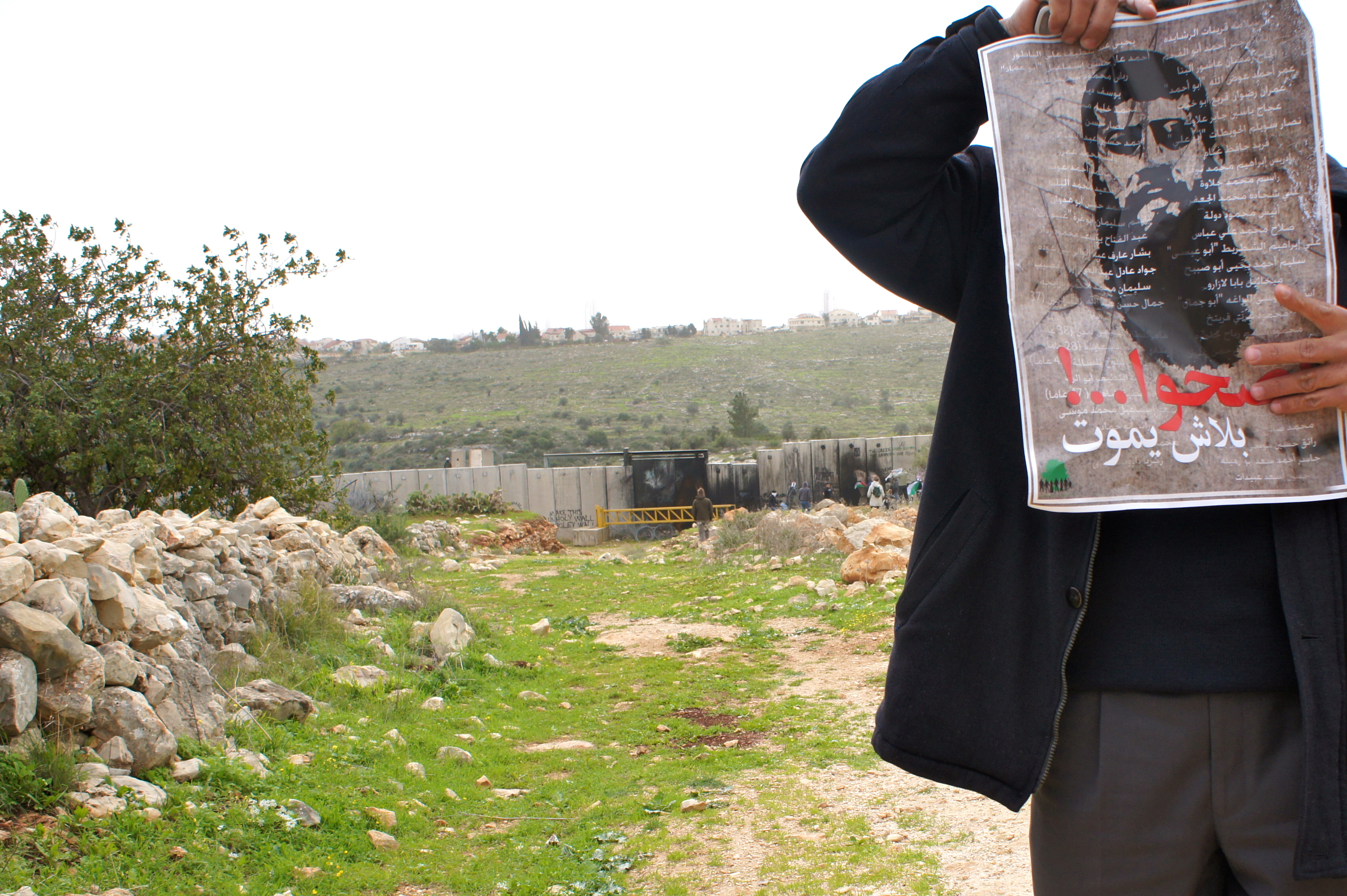
Demonstration in support of Adnan in Ni'lin on 17 February 2012. There have been several demonstrations supporting Adnan's hunger strike throughout the West Bank.

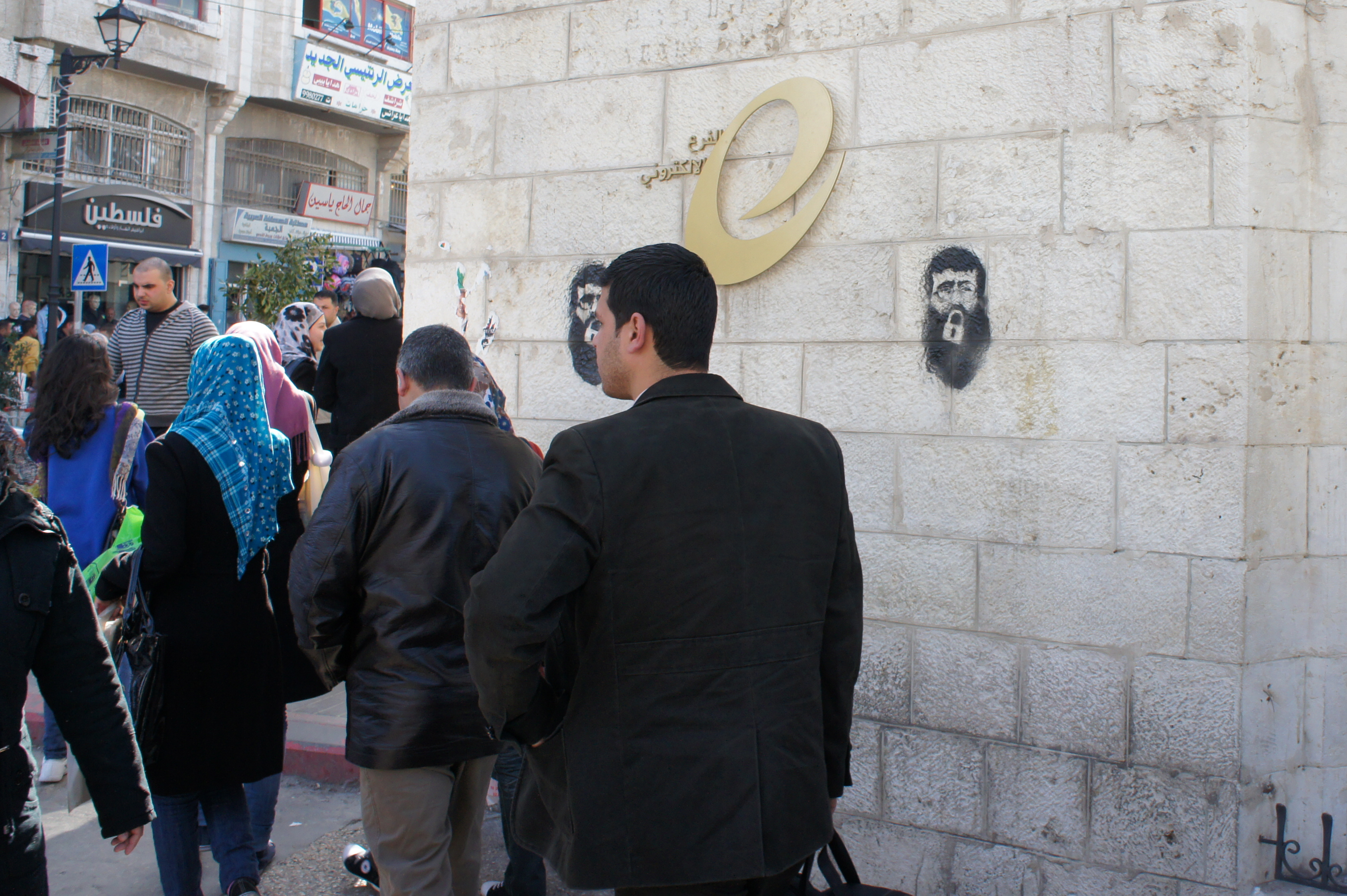
Graffiti stencils of Khader Adnan on a wall by Al-Manara Square in Ramallah

Adnan's 2012 hunger strike prompted demonstrations in the West Bank and the Gaza Strip, and hundreds of Palestinian prisoners joined the hunger strike in solidarity. Adnan's father Musa Adnan started an open-ended hunger strike on 6 February the same year, telling Ma'an News Agency it would "enable him to support his son and understand his pain." His hometown of Arraba was at the center of demonstrations, with solidarity protesters camping outside his house, with Palestinian and foreign officials visiting to enquire about Adnan's health conditions. Around 50–60 Palestinians protested outside the Church of the Nativity in Bethlehem to show solidarity with Adnan on 8 February.

On 11 February 2012 hundreds of Palestinians staged a demonstration at the Ofer Prison where Adnan was being held. The Israeli Army dispersed the protesters using rubber bullets and tear gas, injuring 16. At a separate demonstration in Beit Ummar near Hebron two Israelis and two Palestinians were arrested by Israel. Dozens of students from Birzeit University that gathered outside Ofer Prison on 13 February demanding Adnan's release were dispersed by Israeli security forces resulting in the injury of 23 people. On 15 February, supporters began an open hunger strike at a sit-in in front of the International Committee of the Red Cross in Gaza City.

On 16 February 2012, the 61st day of Adnan's hunger strike, thousands of demonstrators protested throughout the Palestinian territories. About 1,000 mostly young Palestinians protested outside of Ofer Prison before being dispersed and in Hebron, hundreds of supporters held a sit-in holding posters reading "No to administrative arbitrary detention." That same day, Palestinians observed a 10-hour hunger strike in solidarity.

Around 5,000 protesters demonstrated in Gaza City on 17 February 2012 chanting "We are all Khader Adnan," with the PIJ, Hamas and Fatah factions all participating. In Jenin, meanwhile, hundreds of Palestinians partook in a solidarity protest.

=== International media attention, appeal and release ===
Adnan's case first drew international media attention when AFP ran a report was 44 days into his hunger strike. A week and a half after that, the Associated Press also ran a story, followed by CNN shortly afterwards.

On 9 February, CNN reported that in response to criticism from human rights groups, the Israeli Prison Authority stated Adnan's case was being handled "strictly according to the law … with special attention being given to his humanitarian situation." The prison service also stated that Adnan agreed to take potassium pills and does not want to die.

Randa Adnan appealed to Egyptian authorities to help release her husband stating "Hope is now in Egypt to release Adnan. There's talk about Egyptian efforts to do so and I hope it's true. Egypt had an active role in the last prisoner exchange deal between Hamas and Israel – it is our older sister and we hope it intervenes." The Palestinian Ministry of Prisoners' Affairs confirmed that Egypt was intervening with Israel to release Adnan. She had also said that Adnan will not backtrack on his decision, and that, "When I married him I knew I should expect anything. I am proud of him whether he is under the ground or above it."

Almost two months into his hunger strike, it was reported that Adnan agreed to have electrolytes, vitamins, glucose, and salts added to the water he was drinking. His doctors noted that, "A fast in excess of 70 days does not permit survival. Infusion of liquids, adjustment of salts, and the addition of glucose and vitamin cannot prevent certain death due to such a protracted hunger strike."

The Military Court of Appeals rejected his first appeal against detention in a session convened at a hospital in Safed where he was being held on 13 February 2012.

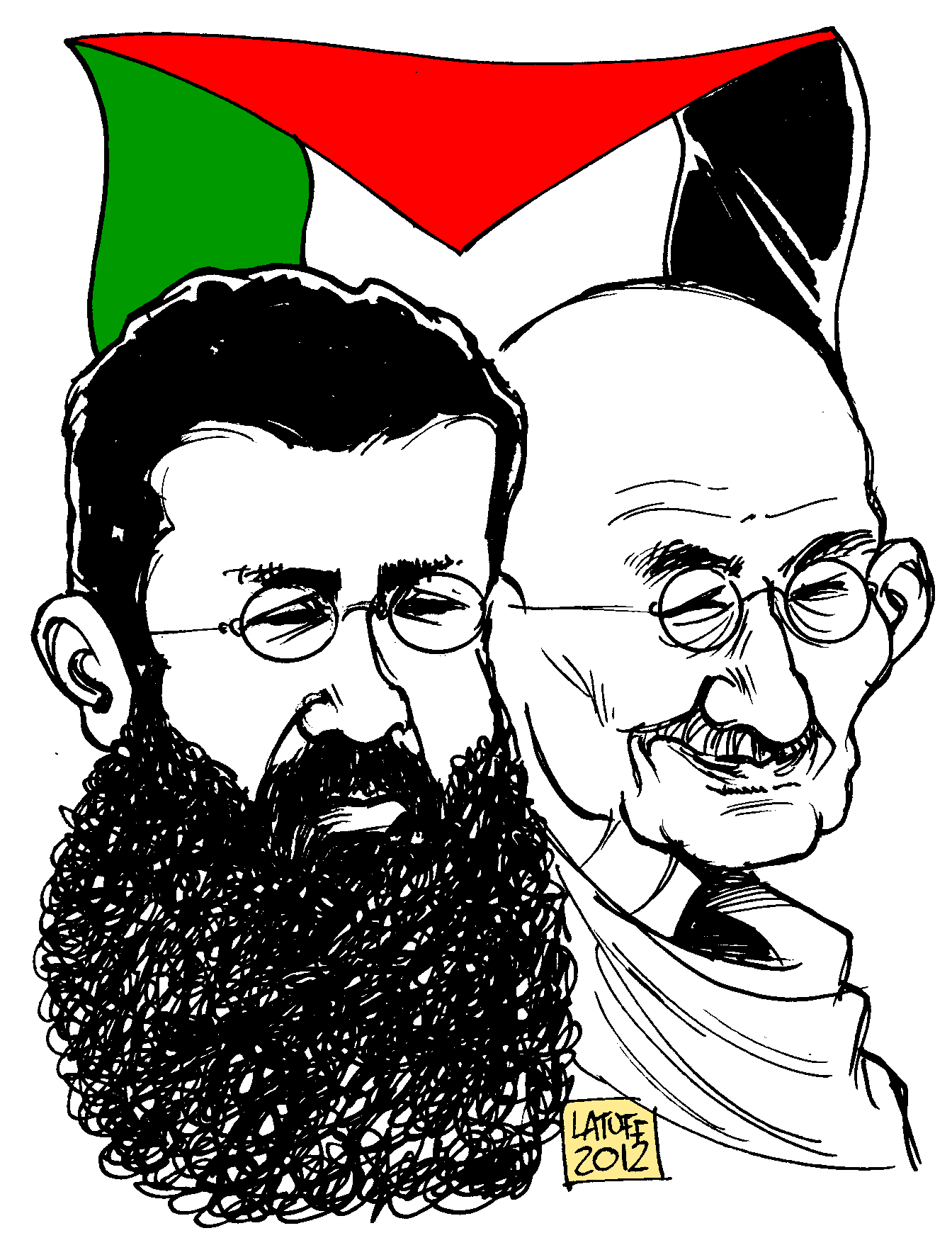
2012 Carlos Latuff sketch showing Khader Adnan alongside Mahatma Gandhi against the backdrop of the Palestinian flag, inked after Adnan went viral as a "Palestinian Gandhi"

On 16 February, Adnan's lawyers petitioned the Supreme Court of Israel to release him, citing that Adnan was in "immediate danger of death." Lawyer Mahmoud Kassandra stated "This is the last chance. The medical report says he could die at any minute. We hope this will succeed but I am not optimistic." Following a visit to Adnan by Rebecca Ziv from Physicians for Human Rights – Israel, she said of his situation:

He has lost 30kg and weighs 60kg. He suffers from stomach aches, vomiting, sometimes with blood, and headaches … His general condition is pale and very weak, his tongue is smooth, he has slight bleeding from the gums, dry skin, loss of hair, and significant muscular atrophy. His pulse is weak, blood pressure 100/75. He is permanently connected to a heart monitor.

On 20 February, in a media coup for Palestinian online activists, former Obama official Anne-Marie Slaughter and Roseanne Barr condemned Adnan's detention on Twitter, and Adnan's plight began trending.

Peter Hart, the activism director for Fairness and Accuracy in Reporting (FAIR), authored a comment criticizing the corporate media's silence on this "Palestinian Gandhi", while activists targeted Nicholas Kristof for his silence despite writing a 2010 New York Times opinion piece calling for a "Gandhi" in the Palestinian context.

On 21 February, the Supreme Court moved forward an emergency hearing for Adnan after initially scheduling it for 23 February, citing concern for his health. Moments before the hearing was convened, it was announced that a deal had been reached between Adnan's lawyers and the Israeli prosecution lawyers whereby Adnan would stop his hunger strike in exchange for his 4-month detention being counted from the day of his arrest and a promise not to renew his administrative detention barring the presentation of any new evidence.

=== Human rights and international response ===
Adnan's hunger strike drew critical scrutiny of Israel's practice of administrative detention by a number of human rights groups, international bodies and Palestinian leaders and protesters. He has garnered a large following on Facebook and Twitter. Several of Adnan's supporters argue his case has not received proper coverage in the international and Israeli media.

Addameer, a Palestinian prisoners' support group expressed "utmost concern about the health" of Adnan, holding Israel accountable for his life. The head of the Palestinian Prisoners' Society Qadura Fares condemned the Israeli military court's refusal of Adnan's appeal.

Human Rights Watch stated Israel must "immediately end its unlawful administrative detention" of Adnan and "charge or release him." Spokeswoman Sarah Leah Whitson said "Israel should end, today, before it's too late, its almost two-month-long refusal to inform Adnan of any criminal charge or evidence against him." Amnesty International condemned Israel's policy of administrative detention, and the Israeli human rights group B'tselem sent an urgent request to Israeli Minister of Intelligence, Dan Meridor, to either immediately release or try Adnan to "prevent a needless tragedy to him and his family."

Richard Falk, the UN Special Rapporteur on Palestinian human rights, criticized "authority figures, from the UN Secretary General on down," who he said expressed empathy for Gilad Shalit, while being "notably silent in the much more compelling ordeal being experienced before our eyes in the form of Mr Adnan's captivity, seemingly unto death."

==== Political response ====
The Palestinian National Authority condemned his arrest and demanded his immediate release. In response to Israel's refusal of Adnan's appeal, Minister of Prisoners' Affairs Issa Qaraqe stated the decision showed "utter disregard for Adnan's life, effectively condemning him to die." He praised Adnan for "taking a stand" against the use of administrative detention. At a rally on 16 February, Qaraqe said, "Khader Adnan has become a national symbol, an Arab symbol and an international symbol for his defence of the dignity of free men throughout the entire world."

Palestinian lawmaker Mustafa Barghouti, who was injured after being shot in the foot with a rubber bullet by Israeli security forces during a solidarity protest, called for an international campaign demanding Adnan's release. Palestinian Islamic Jihad leaders Sheikh Nafez Azzam, Dawood Shihab, Khader Habib and Ahmad Mudallal participated in the open hunger strike that began on 15 February saying it was the "least we can do for this legendary symbol."

At a Friday sermon at the Great Mosque of Gaza, PIJ leader Nafez Azzam stated Adnan was "not fighting for a personal cause, but for the defence of thousands of prisoners." Furthermore, he accused Arab and Western countries of ignoring Adnan's case saying "Shame on the nations of hundreds of millions (of Muslims) for the fact that Khader Adnan is still in prison." Gaza-based Prime Minister Ismail Haniyeh, declared at a rally in Gaza that same day that, "The Palestinian people, with all its components and its factions, will never abandon the hero prisoners, especially those who lead this hunger strike battle."

On 18 February, it was reported that in meetings with officials from China, Russia, the United Kingdom and the European Union, President Mahmoud Abbas and PLO negotiator Saeb Erekat pressed for Adnan's release.

United Nations Special Coordinator for the Middle East peace process Robert Serry instructed Israel "to do everything in its power to preserve the health of the prisoner and resolve this case while abiding by all legal obligations under international law." On 18 February, European Union head Catherine Ashton called on Israel to preserve Adnan's health and reiterated the EU's concern over "the extensive use by Israel of administrative detention without formal charge."

== Further detentions and hunger strikes, 2014–2021 ==
In spite of the agreement to end his first hunger strike (see above), Adnan was arrested again on 8 July 2014, at the beginning of the 2014 Israel–Gaza conflict, and has been held in detention ever since, beginning his second hunger strike on 5 May 2015. The government of Israel was seemingly determined to break Adnan's hunger strike using force-feeding techniques similar to those used by the USA in its Guantanamo Bay prison camp. Israeli Minister of Public Security Gilad Erdan was quoted as saying "Security prisoners are interested in turning hunger strikes into a new kind of suicide attack that would threaten the State of Israel. We cannot allow anyone to threaten us and we will not allow prisoners to die in our prisons." However, the Israeli Medical Society and various human rights groups were deploring this planned course of action by Israel, with the Medical Society issuing orders to Israeli doctors to not participate in any planned forced feedings except under certain limited circumstances not applicable to Adnan at this point in time.

Adnan was again detained without charge in 2015 and again started a hunger strike on 4 May that lasted 56 days until Israel agreed to release him in July. He was arrested again in 2017 and again immediately began a hunger strike that lasted 58 days. Arrested once more in 2021 after being detained at an Israeli checkpoint, and he again went on hunger strike in protest, this strike lasting 25 days.

== 2023 detention and hunger strike ==
Adnan was arrested, for the final time, on 5 February 2023, following which he began the hunger strike that lasted 87 days until his death. Physicians for Human Rights Israel said that, in the lead up to his death, their medic had visited Adnan and raised his "life-threatening condition and the need for immediate hospital transfer". At his third military court appeal, the military judge ruled that there was no evidence of urgency in Adnan's medical condition.

== Death ==
Adnan died in prison on 2 May 2023, following an 87-day hunger strike at the age of 45. Adnan was the first Palestinian prisoner to die from a hunger strike since 1992.

=== Reaction ===
Following his death, various media outlets called Adnan a political prisoner.

The Israeli rights group B'Tselem described his hunger strike as "a form of non-violent protest against his arrest and the injustices of the occupation. The fact that a person whose life was in danger remained in prison despite repeated requests to transfer him to a hospital reflects the absolute disregard Israel held for his life." Addameer released a statement from the Palestinian Human Rights Organizations Council (PHROC) calling Adnan's death a killing and his fate as a political prisoner a call to the international community "to realize its moral and legal responsibilities towards the Palestinian people, especially Palestinian political prisoners captive within illegal occupation prisons".

The United Nations Deputy Spokesman for the Secretary General called for a thorough investigation and said the Secretary General "reiterates his call on Israel to end the practice of administrative detention. All those held in administrative detention should be promptly charged and tried in a court of law or released without delay".

Adnan's wife called for violence to be avoided, in accordance with her husband's peaceful protests. She said: "Not a drop of blood was spilled during the prisoner's previous hunger strikes, and today we say with the rise of the martyr and his accomplishment of what he wished for, we do not want a drop of blood to be spilled." In other reported comments, she stated: "We don't want anyone to respond to the martyrdom. We don't want someone to launch rockets and then (Israel) strikes Gaza."

==== Conflict escalation ====
Despite his wife's pleas, militants in Gaza fired over twenty rockets at Israel and clashes between Palestinians and Israeli armed forces erupted in the West Bank as news of Adnan's death spread and a general strike was called for in the occupied territories. In response to the rocket firings, Israeli fighter jets struck targets in Gaza on 9 May, leading to at least thirteen deaths.

== See also ==
- Muhammad al-Qiq
- Bobby Sands, of the 1981 Irish hunger strike
- Hana Shalabi
- Maikel Nabil Sanad
