= JJ Foodservice (company) =

British food wholesaler

JJ Food Service
- Founded: December 23, 1988; 37 years ago in London, United Kingdom
- Founder: Mustafa Kiamil
- Fate: Active
- Headquarters: London, UK
- Area served: United Kingdom
- Products: Food; Oils; Desserts; Potato products; Rice; Fish; Seafood; Bakery; Herbs and spices; Cleaning products
- Revenue: £243.4m (2025)
- Net income: £11.4m (2025)
- Website: jjfoodservice.com

JJ Foodservice (founded as JJ Fast Food Distribution Limited) is a UK-based foodservice wholesaler and distributor. The company supplies food, beverages, packaging, and cleaning products to restaurants and household consumers. The business is open to both trade and the public.

== History ==
JJ Foodservice was founded in 1988 by entrepreneur Mustafa Kiamil, who opened the company's first warehouse in Hornsey, North London. The company's roots can be traced to 1982 when Kiamil started a burger bar named Jenny's Burgers, which expanded into a chain. To support the chain, Kiamil established a catering delivery business, which soon began supplying other independent restaurants.

JJ Foodservice self-funded its growth and owns its buildings, vehicles, and equipment outright. Growth came through a combination of branch expansion, investment in proprietary technology, and strategic acquisitions. In 2024, it acquired London-based Gatelands Supplies to target the Asian restaurant sector.

The company has donated free meals to hospitals and care homes.

JJ Foodservice launched its own-brand web shop featuring 40+ premium brands and 500+ products in September 2022. In the year ending March 2022, more than a third of total sales (36%) came from own-brand products which represented a 20% increase year on year.

In 2024 during the inflationary wave, JJ Foodservice launched its Mix & Save program for restaurants with key brands including P&G Professional, Britvic and Coca-Cola.

== Operations ==
In the financial year ended 31 March 2025, the company reported turnover of £243,411,300 and net income of £11,423,564. The company has over 800 employees and owns 12 branches as of 2024.

JJ has invested in digital services and automation. In 2009, it launched online ordering, and by 2025, self-service kiosks were rolled out in all branches. 75% of sales are generated online.

To address driver shortages, the Group encourages more women to become HGV drivers. It has also recruited from Poland. The company equips its truck drivers with devices to track vehicle location, delivery completion, and stock distribution.

=== Own-brand products ===
JJ Foodservice has over 600 products out of 4000 total SKUs in its own-label range, including award-winning foods and drinks. Categories include oils, desserts, potato products, rice, fish, seafood, bakery, herbs and spices, and sustainable packaging. JJ Foodservice won across five categories at the CCM Chefs' Own-Brand Awards 2025/6. At the 2024 The Grocer New Product Awards, JJ's olive oil won and in 2025, their crunchy chips won. In 2026, JJ Foodservice won awards for three of its own-brand products in the Guild of Fine Food's Great Taste Awards.

=== Awards ===
In 2025, JJ won National Wholesaler of the Year in The Grocer's Gold Awards which recognized its introduction of "new and innovative own brand products". In January 2026, it launched a specialist Japanese product range for restaurants,caterers and takeaway operators including sushigrade salmon and other premium fish products such as black cod, yellowfin tuna and yellowtail kingfish, intended for use in sushi and Japanese cuisine. In 2026, JJ once again won National Wholesaler of the Year in The Grocer's Gold Awards.
