= 1992 An-Najah National University standoff =

- Part of the First Intifada and Israeli–Palestinian conflict
- Date: 14 July 1992 – 17 July 1992
- Location: An-Najah National University, West Bank, Palestine

Parties
An-Najah National University students	Israel Defense Forces

Number
~3,000	~300

The 1992 An-Najah National University standoff was a four-day standoff between An-Najah National University students and Israel Defence Forces soldiers in July 1992.

== Background ==
Following the First Intifada, a mass wave of strikes and civil disobedience in Palestine protesting against Israeli occupation from 1987 to 1991, the Israeli–Palestinian peace process took a significant step forward with the beginning of the Oslo Accords negotiations. The 1992 Israeli legislative election in June 1992 represented another potential move towawrds calming tensions, with the more moderate Israeli Labor Party winning the elections and replacing the hardline Likud-led government.

An-Najah National University is a public university in Nablus, in the northern Palestinian West Bank, and is one of the largest universities in Palestine. During the First Intifada, the university was ordered shut by the Israeli military.

== Events ==
In mid-July 1992, the An-Najah National University student union elections were due to be held after twice being postponed. The election, whose campaign was heated, saw two main factions competing: a leftist-nationalist bloc (associated with the Palestinian Liberation Organisation) and a more conservative Islamist bloc (associated with Hamas). As well, the United States Secretary of State James Baker was due to make an official visit to Israel later that month.

On 14 July, the day of the election, the Israeli military received reports that six fugitives associated with Fatah's Black Panthers had entered the An-Najah campus grounds. The IDF subsequently deployed soldiers to the campus and began stopping and searching students. After students complained, the IDF deployed additional soldiers to surround the university campus, saying that they would not let anyone leave without first being searched and interrogated. The IDF further declared the university grounds a "closed military area," where military censorship rules on journalists applied. A curfew was also imposed on the city of Nablus, as well as four adjacent refugee camps with roadblocks set up across the city.

In response, students barricaded themselves inside university buildings, demanding that they be allowed to leave freely and that Israel not interfere with their elections, even after the Israeli military stated that it would not allow food or water to be brought into the university. The student union elections resulted in a significant victory for the leftist-nationalist bloc.

On 16 July, a widespread commercial strike was held across Palestine in solidarity with the students. A demonstration by residents that was held outside the campus saw one Palestinian seriously wounded when Israeli soldiers opened fire using live ammunition after the demonstrators threw stones at the soldiers. One hundred prominent Palestinian figures also announced that they would be launching a hunger strike in support. The PLO sent representatives to try and negotiate an end to the standoff, including Faisal Husseini and Saeb Erekat. Israeli Major General Daniel Rothschild also took part in negotiations. Negotiations were done through the third party International Red Cross and Red Crescent Movement.

On 17 July, as Israeli forces prepared plans to storm the campus, negotiators announced that they had reached a deal to end the standoff. The terms of deal including allowing the six fugitives to pass into exile in Jordan and withdrawal of Israeli soldiers from the university campus. The fugitives were subsequently escorted into Jordan across the Allenby Bridge by the Red Cross.

== Reactions ==
=== In Palestine ===
PLO spokesperson Faisal Husseini stated that the PLO believed that "Mr. Rabin wanted to find a solution," saying that while the PLO opposed the policy of exile, "we might have to do something we do not normally do, and in this instance, such a solution will save lives, and we support it."

Palestinian Ambassador to the United Nations Nasser al-Qudwa stated that the Israeli military had been "intimidating and harassing everyone on campus" during the student union election, describing the standoff as a siege that was "endangering the lives of many Palestinians." Prominent Palestinian philosopher Sari Nusseibeh stated that "it is not acceptable for the army to be putting a siege on an entire university campus."

=== In Israel ===
Prime Minister of Israel Yitzhak Rabin stated that he was "very sorry about the combination of circumstances. I did not decide to hold student council elections at A-Najah University. I do not know who determined this, or why." Deputy Minister of Defence Mordechai Gur stated that "the lesson learned here is that there is a desire to come to understandings and a desire to solve problems through understanding." Israeli Chief of the General Staff Ehud Barak stated that the Israeli military aimed to capture the fugitives not kill them, saying that "using force is an option, not an obesssion for us."

MK Rehavam Ze'evi of the far-right Moledet party accused the Israeli government of "surrendering to terrorists."

=== Internationally ===
United Nations Committee on the Exercise of the Inalienable Rights of the Palestinian People chair Kéba Birane Cissé stated that he was "gravely concerned at the increasing imposition of harsh collective punishment against the population." The Arab League condemned the stanadoff, calling it "part of a series of acts of aggression committed against Palestinian institutions and establishments and against Palestinians." Spokesperson for the United States Department of State Richard A. Boucher stated that the American government was "urging people to resolve this peacefully, and we're urging them to exercise maximum restraint."

Human Rights Watch stated that while election of a Labour government in Israel after the 1992 Israeli legislative election "has not changed this general picture" of human rights abuses during the Israeli-Palestinian conflict, its handling of the standoff was one of "a number of encouraging gestures during its first weeks in office," noting that "for the first time since 1988, all six Palestinian universities were permitted to function."

== Analysis ==
Daniel Williams of the Los Angeles Times as "a test of the efforts of new Prime Minister Yitzhak Rabin to improve the atmosphere and content of relations with the Palestinians. In addition, it put to trial the willingness and ability of moderate Palestinian leaders to convince their followers that negotiations--even of this limited kind--can work."

Gil Sedan of the Jewish Telegraphic Agency described the standoff as an example of how the Palestinian community was "more deeply divided than ever" after the First Intifada, pointing to both the growing rivalry between the more moderate Fatah and the upsurgent conservative Islamist Hamas and the growing disconnect between the PLO leadership and the "local leadership of the refugee camps, the city streets and the trade unions."

== Aftermath ==
On 17 July 1992, a patrol of the Israeli-backed South Lebanon Army militia was ambushed by the Democratic Front for the Liberation of Palestine in the Israeli-occupied zone of southern Lebanon, resulting in one SLA and DFLP death each. The DFLP claimed that the ambush was carried out in retaliation for the university standoff.
