= Revolving door policy (Palestinian Authority) =

Alleged policy of the Palestinian National Authority

The revolving door policy (Hebrew: 'מדיניות הדלת המסתובבת של הרשות' or 'מדיניות הדלת המסתובבת של הרש"פ') is the name for an alleged policy of the Palestinian Authority (PA). Under this policy, the PA would arrest terror suspects in order to appease the international community and Israel, but then either release them, facilitate their escape, or move them to very comfortable conditions. The term was used by the Israeli, British, and United States governments.

== Background ==
After the 1994 Oslo Accords, the Israel Defense Forces (IDF) withdrew from parts of the West Bank, ceding control to the newly constructed Palestinian Authority (PA) as the 'roadmap for peace' stipulated. PA control areas had those accused of giving Israel information about terrorist activity killed and, in general, the withdrawal caused Israel to lose its intelligence gathering capabilities concerning attacks originating from the West Bank.

The agreements of the Oslo Accords included that the Israeli and PA intelligence apparatuses would collaborate with each other and the PA was supposed to take over intelligence gathering in the areas under their control and report planned attacks to Israel. However, the PA was reluctant to give the Israelis information about pending attacks. Israeli security forces continued to gather intelligence regarding pending terrorist attacks originating from PA control. They passed this information to PA intelligence, requesting that the PA intercept the attackers. The PA would frequently ignore the information, and at times, pass the information to the terrorists.

The PA also agreed to arrest members of Hamas and Islamic Jihad.

== Policy ==
Despite the PA's reluctance to arrest suspected terrorists or report their plans to the Israeli security forces, they faced pressure from the international community and Israel to comply with their collaboration agreements. From this was born the policy in which in order to appease the international community and Israel, the PA would arrest the suspected terrorists, but then either release them, facilitate their escape, or move them to very comfortable conditions.

== Example of policy's application ==
In December 2007, two members of Islamic Jihad drove up to three Israeli hikers and shot at them, killing two of them. Immediately thereafter, the perpetrators turned themselves into the intelligence apparatus of the Palestinian Authority because they feared being arrested by the IDF. In January 2008, the two were sentenced to 15 years in prison by a PA court. In March 2008, Ynet reported that the two were given furloughs by the PA, but when the Israeli government found out about the furloughs, the PA asked them to return to prison. There were reports that one of the prisoners did not return from the furlough.

== Notable perspectives and usage ==
The term was used by the Israeli, British, and United States governments.

== See also ==
- Revolving door syndrome
- Pay-for-slay
