= 1995 Palestinian prisoners' hunger strike =

1995 hunger strike by Palestinian prisoners

- Part of Israeli–Palestinian conflict
- Date: 17 June 1995 – 6 July 1995
- Location: Occupied Palestinian territories
- Methods: Hunger strike, protest

The 1995 Palestinian prisoners' hunger strike was an 18-day hunger strike by Palestinians in Israeli custody from 17 June to 6 July 1995.

== Background ==
In 1993, a significant breakthrough in the Israeli–Palestinian peace process occurred with the signing of the Oslo I Accord and launching of the Oslo Accords peace talks. As part of the Accords, a significant number of Palestinians in Israeli custody were released by the Israeli government. However, more Palestinians would be arrested and detained between 1993 and 1995. On 5 June 1995, the Palestinian Authority reported that 3200 Palestinians had been arrested by Israeli forces in the West Bank since the beginning of the year. The peace negotiations also proved to be complicated, particularly as the conflict in Lebanon continued, with Hezbollah launching strikes into Israel in June 1995, Israeli settlement in Palestine continued to expand, and a number of movements within Israel opposed the Oslo Accords.

== History ==
On 17 June 1995, 700 Palestinians being detained by Israel in Jneid Prison, in Nablus, launched a hunger strike demanding that Israel release all Palestinians being held in Israel detention. The hunger strike quickly spread to other Israeli prison with significant numbers of Palestinians. In response to the strike, Palestinian President Yasser Arafat issued a statement in which he stated that the "issue has to be put at the top of the Israeli government's agenda" and that the PLO asked "for what has been agreed upon to be implemented."

On 20 June, a demonstration in support of the striking prisoners was held in Gaza in front of the offices of the International Committee of the Red Cross, with demonstrators wearing chains in a symbol of protest. On 21 June, Arafat led a 24-hour fast in solidarity with the prisoners. On 22 June, 4 Palestianians were injured after the Israeli military forcibly dispersed a demonstration in support of the prisoners in Ramallah.

On 24 June, protests in the West Bank developed into clashes with Israeli troops, with at least 15 Palestinians being injured. Protests and clashes widened the next day, resulting in two Palestinian students from An-Najah National University being shot dead by Israeli forces in Nablus, and 50 others being injured. Later that day, after talks with Arafat, Israeli Minister of Foreign Affairs Shimon Peres announced that 10 women prisoners would be released imminently and Minister of Police Moshe Shahal stated that the Israeli government would attempt to release prisoners "without blood on their hands" who had completed most of their sentences. Widespread demonstrations continued on 26 June, with a general strike being declared throughout the West Bank. Also that day, the Israel Prison Service attempted to break up a strike among the Palestinian prisoners in Beersheba Prison, resulting in six prisoners being hospitalised after prison officers threw tear gas into cells.

On 28 June, PLO politician Faisal Husseini announced that he would be joining the strike, saying in a statement that "I am one of the people who pushed this peace process forward and I have the feeling that what I did and my partnership in the peace process is causing suffering of Palestinians in the prison." On 30 June, Palestinian Authority Minister of Planning Nabil Shaath held a meeting with Israeli officials over prisoner release, without any agreement being reached. The next day, Israeli forces clashed with protestors in the Palestinian Territories supporting prisoner release, resulting in 150 Palestinians being injured and one being killed.

On 4 July, negotiators for the Oslo Accords announced that the accords would include a gradual release of Palestinian prisoners, supervised by the Israeli government. On 5 July, a women's march was held in Ramallah calling for the release of the prisoners.

On 6 July, the prisoners agreed to end the hunger strike.

== Reactions ==
Israeli Prime Minister Yitzhak Rabin described the hunger strike as "the most sensitive moment" in Israeli-Palestinian relations since the signing of the Oslo I Accord.

== Aftermath ==
In November 1995, Israeli Prime Minister Yitzhak Rabin was assassinated by Israeli ultranationalist Yigal Amir, who opposed the Oslo Accords process.

== See also ==
- List of strikes in Palestine
