= Conquest of Palestine =

Conquest of Palestine may refer to one of the following:

- Bar Kokhba Revolt - Roman conquest of rebellious Judea and renaming it to Palaestina in 135/6
- Sasanian conquest and occupation of Jerusalem - Persian conquest and occupation of Byzantine Palaestina Prima and Palaestina Secunda provinces from 614 until 617/628
- Muslim conquest of the Levant - campaign of Arab Muslim armies to conquer and occupy Syria, Transjordan and Palestine in mid-7th century
- First Crusade - resulting in conquest and occupation of Islamic districts of Filastin and al-Urdun in Greater Syria province and consequent establishment of the Kingdom of Jerusalem
- Mongol invasions of the Levant - resulting in short-term invasion and occupation of Mamluk Palestine in 1260
- Ottoman–Mamluk War (1516–17) - resulting in Ottoman conquest, occupation and annexation of the Levant, including Palestine
- Jordanian annexation of the West Bank - capturing and unilaterally annexing parts of the former Mandatory Palestine in 1948/9
- Israeli Military Governorate - Israeli military occupation of West Bank, Gaza Strip and Golan Heights following Six Day War from 1967 to 1982
