= Palestinian Village Leagues =

West Bank Palestinian organization (1978–1984)

- Harakat al-Rawabet al-Filistiniyya
- Leader: Mustafa Dodin
- Founded: 1978; 48 years ago
- Dissolved: 1984; 42 years ago
- Country: Palestine
- Ideology: Clan interests Pro-Jordanianism; Conservatism
- Status: Dissolved

The Palestinian Village Leagues (Harakat al-Rawabet al-Filistiniyya) were a group of rural leadership organisations in the Palestinian West Bank active between 1978 and 1984. Based on clan structures, the Village Leagues were created and armed with Israeli support as part a framework in which the Israeli government believed it could undermine the influence of the more urban, nationalist, and left-wing Palestine Liberation Organization. Widely considered among the Palestinian population as inauthentic and as collaborators, the Village Leagues were ultimately dissolved less than a decade after their creation.

== History ==
=== Creation ===Israel established the Israeli Military Governorate after capturing the West Bank during the Six-Day War in 1967. In 1976, the Israeli government allowed city councils across the occupied West Bank to hold elections. The result was an overwhelming victory for nationalist candidates, most of whom were younger, more educated, and less pro-Jordan than the previous Palestinian political establishment, and most of whom were supportive of the PLO. The results shocked the Israeli government, who had a policy of not recognising or negotiating with the PLO and who had hoped that the elections would result in victories for more moderate and less nationalist candidates. These mayors would subsequently play a leading role in the formation of the National Guidance Committee, a progressive and nationalist leadership coalition that aimed to coordinate opposition to the Israeli occupation.

Following the elections, Menahem Milson, a professor of Arabic literature at the Hebrew University of Jerusalem and who had previously served as a paratrooper under Ariel Sharon, was named as the new chief Advisor on Arab Affairs to the Military Governorate. As advisor, Menahem and his assistant, Yigal Carmon, argued for a significant change in the way that the Israeli government administered the occupation. Milson believed that the Governorate needed to end its policy of minimising the visibility of the occupation in day-to-day Palestinian life, to take a more active role in internal Palestinian politics, to cultivate pro-Israeli Palestinians as leaders, and to turn the Governorate's focus away from urban areas, which were the strongholds of nationalist sentiment. Instead, Milson believed that the Governorate should turn towards rural Palestine, which he and other Israeli Orientalists believed was still primarily structured according to centuries-old conservative clan norms, norms that were opposed to the PLO's modern nationalism, that were predisposed towards clientelism, and that the Israeli government could subsequently exploit.

In a 1986 article in Commentary, Milson explained his reasoning that "instead of assuming that the Palestinians in the territories could not or should not play a role in the political process, the new policy assumed that they could and should; instead of the requirement that the IMG remain 'neutral,' the IMG would actively attempt to curtail PLO influence and simultaneously encourage those Palestinians who openly recognized Israel," saying that he had "a clear political goal to this policy: to develop conditions conducive to the emergence of Palestinian leaders ready for peace negotiations." In 2016, Carmon explained that they wished to promote "moderate elements who understood that terrorism endangered the Palestinians themselves," and that "although we were well aware that these elements were not dominant and that the positions they espoused were not largely shared by the urban elite that for years had constituted the leading sector of Palestinian society, we also knew that most members of the non-urban population - the silent majority - were prepared to accept this approach if assured of an Israeli commitment to it."

The next year, the right-wing Likud party would win the Israeli legislative elections and would form government for the first time under Prime Minister Menachem Begin. Begin's term as Prime Minister would bring about a number of significant changes to Israeli policies towards Palestine, including massively expanding Israeli settlements and enacting increasingly strict measures to try and forcibly suppress Palestinian nationalism. According to Salim Tamari of Birzeit University, the Likud government wished to "overturn what it saw as Labor's legacy of appeasing Palestinian nationalist forces, evident in the emergence of pro-PLO forces in the 1976 municipal elections and the toleration of the Jerusalem-based Palestinian nationalist press."

As a result of the changes in Israeli policy, Mustafa Dodin, a Palestinian-born former minister in the Government of Jordan who had moved back into the West Bank in 1975, came out of retirement to try and take on a leading role in Palestinian politics. Dodin was politically pro-Jordan and anti-PLO, having backed the Jordanian monarchy during Black September in 1970 and consitently having advocated for the Jordanian option, believing that an independent Palestinian state was not viable. He proposed the creation the Palestinian Village Leagues as rural-based leadership organisation based on clan structures that could serve as a counterweight to PLO influence in the West Bank and could lead towards peace negotiations with Israel. The Military Governorate approved Dodin's proposal in 1978 via Israeli Military Order No. 752, with Village Leagues being formed in seven different West Bank regions, and offered him Israeli support.

In 1981, Begin named decorated former military commander Ariel Sharon as Minister of Defence, giving him responsibility for the occupation. As Minister of Defence, Sharon quickly moved to re-organise the Military Governorate into the Israeli Civil Administration, naming Milson as its head. Together, Sharon and Milson moved to expand the role of the Village Leagues. In 1982, the seven Village Leagues were officially affiliated together with the creation of the Federation of Village Leagues.

=== Activities and positions ===
The Village Leagues officially declared their purpose to be "the resolution of local disputes among villagers in the most efficient and least costly methods" as well as the development of "rural cooperatives and social and charitable societies which will work for the benefit of all villagers." The Leagues took on a number of municipal government functions, including issuing drivers' licences and travel permits, policing functions, as well as undertaking municipal development projects. They also ran their own newspaper, al-Mira'aa. As well, the Leagues held several "Yes to Peace" rallies, co-organised with the Civil Administration. They were funded via subsidies from the Israeli government as well as collecting their own taxes from Palestinians.

In a January 1983 interview with Leeora Bush of the Zionist Federation of Australia, Dodin stated that the priorities of the Village Leagues were: preventing the emigration of Palestinians from the Occupied Territories, improving Palestinian-Israeli relations, opposing communism and terrorism, and establishing democracy. In the interview, Dodin claimed that "before 1977, an Arab would be killed for talking to a Jew, but now Arabs and Jews are friends and soon terror will be no threat at all here." In a June 1983 interview with The Australian Jewish News, Dodin stated that "we are suffering under the occupation," but that the occupation could only be ended "by negotiation. No Arab country will fight Israel. The PLO was stupid to try to build an army." Dodin further stated that "We are too small for a state of our own. The solution must be a federation with Jordan." In August 1983, Dodin indicated that the Village Leagues supported the Reagan peace plan.

Bishara Qumssiyeh, the head of the Bethlehem Village League, supported Israeli demolition of Palestinian property in response to disturbances, saying that "our city of Bethlehem lives on tourism. If parents allow their children to attack tourist buses, they deserve more than having their houses blown up."

=== Conflict between the Village Leagues and Palestinian nationalists ===
In November 1981, the head of the Village League in Ramallah, Yusuf Khatib, and his son were ambushed by a group of Palestinian militants who opened fire on their car, with his son being immediately killed and Khatib dying of his injuries a few days later. The PLO claimed responsibility for the assassination. Khatib's funeral was attended by a range of Israeli and Village League officials, with both Dodin and Milson given eulogies.

According to scholar Hillel Cohen, the establishment of the Village Leagues "enraged the PLO. Members of the Leagues were under constant PLO surveillance; they were harassed, and sometimes attacked, by local activists... Their names and activities were reported to the PLO and to Jordan, which also opposed them." In March 1982, Mayor of Tarqumiyah Kamal Fatafta, a Village Leagues member, was injured when his car was booby-trapped with an explosive device.

The Village Leagues targeted Palestinians who opposed them when they could, including arresting a Birzeit University professor in March 1982 and forcing opponents out of their homes at night. According to American researcher Mark Tessler, the leaders of the Village Leagues "frequently flaunted their new-found influence and used their administrative power to settle scores with their enemies." According to Geoffrey Aronson, "League officials made a practice of using their newly-acquired power to grant favours as well as settle personal and political scores... Vocal opponents in Hebron had their windows smashed. In Bethlehem, they met with physical abuse." In July 1982, six Palestinian youth were injured in a clash with Village League members, where the youth threw stones and the Village Leagues members responded with gunfire. In August 1984, five members of the Village Leagues, including the head of the Bethlehem branch, Bishara Qumssiyeh, were convicted by an Israeli military court of arson and attempting to kill prominent nationalists.

=== Israeli support ===
The Israeli government offered the Village Leagues significant support, including both financial, administrative, and legal support. Financially, the Israeli government gave the Village Leagues tens of millions of Israeli new shekels per year. Administratively and legally, the Israeli government pressured rural Palestinian politicians to join the Leagues, restricted funding and approval for development projects in Palestine not run by the Leagues, refused to grant travel permits to Palestinians unless those permits were approved by the Leagues, and subsidised the purchases of essential materials by League supporters. Development projects built by the Leagues were frequently built to be dependent on the Israeli electric and water grids. The Israeli government also provided weapons and military training to the Village Leagues, particularly following Yusuf Khatib's assassination in 1981. According to Geoffrey Aronson, "the raison d'être of the Leagues was to complement other aspects of Israeli policy. Their dependence upon Israel for political support, funds, and later physical protection was a deliberate element of government policy. If the mayors were instruments of the PLO, as Israel claimed, the Leagues would advance Israeli influence."

The Israeli government's support for the Village Leagues was part of a wider strategy in the late 1970s and 1980s in which it aimed to degrade the influence of the PLO and secular nationalist ideals within Palestinian society by promoting traditional clan (hamula) structures and fundamentalist religious institutions. In that strategy, the Israeli government simultaneously moved to repress pro-nationalist structures, including banning the National Guidance Committee and increasing censorship of Palestinian newspapers. In March 1982, the Israeli government forcibly disbanded the elected city council of Al-Bireh, provoking a significant wave of protests in Palestine, in the wake of which the government moved to disband more Palestinian city councils and to dismiss Palestinians mayors seen as pro-PLO. In June 1982, Israel invaded Lebanon, aiming to end the Palestinian insurgency in South Lebanon and install a pro-Israel government. The Israeli government would also step up its restrictions on Palestinian universities, seen as nationalist hotspots, including arrests of student leaders and forced closures, such as with Birzeit University, which was forcibly closed fourteen times between 1979 and 1988.

By late June 1982, Milson was claiming that the PLO and its supporters were "confused, disorganized and have no place to go." Sharon proclaimed that the Village Leagues were "the most important turning point in Judea and Samaria in the last fifteen years."

=== Decline ===
The Military Governorate's efforts to convince or pressure notable Palestinian figures in the occupied territories to join the Village Leagues largely failed and the Village Leagues were met with widespread hostility among the Palestinian population. At its peak, the largest and most influential of the Leagues, the Hebron Village League, had around 500 members. According to American researcher Mark Tessler, the Village Leagues "tended to attract elements from the social and political margins of Palestinian society, individuals who not only were viewed as collaborators and quislings by most other Palestinians but, in some cases at least, were deemed to be social misfits." American Consul General in Jerusalem from 1980 to 1982 Brandon Grove has stated that those few Palestinians that the Village Leagues did manage to recruit were "a mediocre lot, whose experience had little to do with skills in governing, and whose backgrounds were often shady."

Other factors that undermined the Village Leagues included nepotism and corruption, such as the appointment of Dodin's son as head of agriculture in the Hebron region (despite his having been previously convicted of embezzlement in Jordan), or Yusuf Khatib's involvement in forging documents for fraudulent land sales. The Village Leagues were also undermined by their inability to oppose the increasing pace of Israeli settlement, including the seizure of land in Dodin's own village of Dura. As well, the move to arm the Village Leagues in 1981 was very poorly-received among Palestinians and led to a spike in the Leagues' campaigns against their opponents. According to Geoffrey Aronson, "Israeli reports from Ramallah spoke of a reign of terror by armed League members. Ramallah residents, particularly women, spoke of nighttime harassment at roadblocks set up by the League members, who had been granted police powers by the military government. One young woman explained that she felt more threatened at roadblocks manned by the ill-trained Village League than by those of the IDF."

Following the March 1982 moves against the elected Palestinian city councils, hightened unrest in the occupied territories continued, spiking signifanctly again in mid-April with the 1982 Dome of the Rock shooting and again in June with the Isaeli invasion of Lebanon. Despite Milson and Sharon's public confidence, unease among Israeli occupation officials began to grow. In May, 25 senior staffers of the Civil Administration signed an open letter accusing Milson of undermining the previous work of the Israeli government. Israeli general Binyamin Ben-Eliezer also sparked controversy when he publicly described the Village Leagues as "Quislings." Sharon responded to Ben-Eliezer's remark by saying that "I am ready to accept an Arab calling another Arab a Quisling, but when a Jew calls an Arab who is willing to fight terrorist organisations a Quisling, this is a grave phenomenon, whereby we are destroying ourselves."

In September 1982, Menahem Milson resigned as head of the Civil Administration, citing the Sabra and Shatila massacre, committed by Israeli-backed paramilitaries in Lebanon. Sharon too would resign as Minister of Defence in autumn 1982, after the Kahan Commission found that he bore "personal responsibility" for the massacre. Milson was replaced by Brigadier General Shlomo Ilya, an intelligence officer who had lost a hand in combat during the 1967 Six-Day War, while Sharon was replaced by fellow Likud politician Moshe Arens. Ilya and Arens initially defended the viability of the Village Leagues, with Ilya stating that they were "very young and are making all the mistakes a young political organization makes" and that "slowly and gradually we are extending the number of people who identify with the Village Leagues and the number of villages that cooperate." However, the Civil Administration under their leadership began to distance itself from the Village Leagues. Ilya recommended that the Village Leagues be restricted to local development bodies, and not bodies that aimed to be representative of the Palestinian population.

Conflicts between the Civil Administration and the Village Leagues also began to bubble following Milson and Sharon's resignations. In late 1982, the Village Leagues began agitating for the Civil Administration to grant them a role international politics and peace negotiations. In March 1983, the Village Leagues publicly accused the Civil Administration of interfering in its affairs, after the Civil Administration demanded the resignation of a high-ranking member of the Leagues. In September 1983, Dodin resigned as head of the Federation of Village Leagues, following arguments between Dodin and the Civil Administration where Dodin requested greater autonomy in how the Leagues spent Israeli funding they received, as well as arguments within the Leagues over a longstanding personal grudge between Dodin and Jordanian Prime Minister Mudar Badran.

On 10 March 1984, the Federation of Village Leagues were formally dissolved. In June 1984, the leader of the Bethlehem Village League was arrested for attempting to murder the Mayor of Bethlehem. Following the arrest, the Israeli military moved to disarm the Village Leagues. By the end of the year, the individual Village Leagues had effectively ceased to exist. A small number of Village League leaders would continue to be offered some level of Israeli protection until the breakout of the First Intifada in late 1987.

== Reception ==
The Village Leagues were widely disliked by the Palestinian population, with both moderate and hardline nationalists accusing them of being collaborators. Mayor of Hebron Mustafa Natche called the Leagues a "big propaganda ploy." Mayor of Bethlehem Elias Freij stated that "the Village Leagues play the role of collaborators. I don't deal with them. I never allow them into my house, I don't talk to them. I have no respect for them." Dodin rejected the accusations of collaboration, pledging that "if Minister Sharon asks me for sovereignty even on one meter of the West Bank, I will refuse him with all my might," and saying that he was loyal to Jordan and only negotiated with Israel as a short-term measure to gain development aid.

The Government of Jordan, who still officially claimed sovereignty over the West Bank until 1988, initially ignored the Village Leagues. That policy later turned into opposition, with the government declaring in March 1982 that it would prosecute any Palestinians who joined the Leagues for treason. The penalty for treason was capital punishment. Sharon reacted to the Jordanian government's announcement by saying that it "places Jordan in the same ranks as terrorist organisations," and began confiscating property in the West Bank that was still owned by Jordan.

Mort Dolinsky of the Israeli government's press office stated that "I disagree with 80 per cent of what Dodin says, but I know that he's not going to throw bombs at us. If we don't support him, the PLO will be back in full force in two years." Milson and Sharon's policies within the West Bank were broadly popular with the Israeli public, with one The Jerusalem Post poll finding over 75% support among Jewish Israelis, including two-thirds of Labor Party supporters.

American junior diplomat in Israel Daniel C. Kurtzer sent a memo to United States Secretary of State George Shultz warning that the Village Leagues were likely to fail, calling for the American government to end its policy of refusing to negotiate directly with the PLO instead. In his 1983 book The Fateful Triangle, American intellectual Noam Chomsky described Dodin as "the least popular personality in the West Bank" and accused Milson and Sharon of initiating "the most brutal period of repression in the West Bank."

== Analysis ==
=== Contemporary assessments ===
A 1983 report by the United States Department of State described the Village Leagues as a "rural-based quasi-political organisation," to whom the Israeli government wished to "transfer patronage and authority from elected and established Palestinian nationalist leaders whom Israel objects to as being supporters of the Palestine Liberation Organization." The report further stated that "Israel is likely to continue its efforts to contain and reshape the politics of the West Bank and Gaza through the acquisition of land for settlement, official subsidization of population growth in existing settlements and political support for the Village Leagues."

John Drysdale of The Straits Times argued in 1982 that the Israeli government was operating on several assumptions: that the Palestinian mayors were being threatened by the PLO into a radical nationalist stance, that the Village Leagues more accurately represented the majority views of Palestinians, that radicalised nationalist Palestinians feared a loss of influence if partial autonomy was granted to the Palestinian Territories under the Camp David Accords negotiated with Egypt, and that a peaceful semi-autonomous Palestinian territory would have to include both Palestinians and Israeli settlers. In a 1983 interview with Al HaMishmar, former spokesperson of the Military Governorate Zvi Bar'el claimed that "when Prof Milson arrived in the West Bank as a consultant he considered himself the standard bearer of the anti-Dayanist policy. He argued that Dayan, with his non-intervention policy, had in effect created the PLO... [Milson's policy] destroyed the political infrastructure which he considered PLO-dominated, ruled out any dialogue with it and now boasts of doing away with the PLO in the territories."

Yehuda Litani of Haaretz argued in 1981 that the Israeli government was overlooking the changes in education and social norms in rural Palestinian areas since the early 20th century, as well as the fact that the ratio of rural to urban Palestinians held as prisoners in Israeli prisons was roughly similar to the overall population balance. Litani also argued that the Jewish Agency for Israel had tried to encourage the growth of similarly structured peasants' leagues during the late 1930s, following the 1936–1939 Arab revolt in Palestine, an initiative that also failed. In 1983, Salim Tamari of Birzeit University argued that "it became increasingly difficult for Israel to rule its subject Palestinian population through the direct apparatus of the Military Government after the Likud claimed Jewish sovereignty of the area in 1980-81," saying that "the absence of a surrogate power base for Israeli rule became an obstacle, not only for the implementation of the Accords but also for the mediation of Israel's control over a progressively more unyielding civilian population." Tamari also compared the Village Leagues to the Jewish Agency's attempts to fund alternatives to the Arab Higher Committee, saying that Israel has had a long-running "notion of mobilising the conservative peasantry against its own urban-based nationalist movement."

According to Trudy Rubin of The Christian Science Monitor in 1982, aside from Dodin, "most of the league leaders are unknown and minor figures." Charles D. Smith of San Diego State University argued that opinion polling reflected widespread support for the PLO among Palestinians, saying that "if a West Bank leadership independent of the P.L.O. does emerge, it will still reflect nationalistic hopes for a state without Israeli settlers."

=== Historical assessements ===
There is widespread agreement among commentators that the Village Leagues failed. In 1988, Don Peretz of Binghamton University described the Israeli government's strategy in regards to the Village Leagues as based on the "exploitation of traditional city-country tensions," but that "the Village Leagues were extremely unpopular, and the Milson/Sharon strategy never paid off." Middle East analyst Geoffrey Aronson wrote in 1990 that Sharon's policies did not "understand or respect the political realities of the society toward which they were directed... Sharon, unlike Dayan, was not interested in fashioning a relationship with an indigenous and popular leadership. Rather, he was intent upon its emasculation." Israeli scholar Neve Gordon argued in 2008 that "the underlying assumptions that informed the Leagues’ creation were simplistic and did not take into account the changes that Palestinian society had undergone following Israel’s occupation" and that the Israeli government ultimately failed to "suppress the nationalist spirit that was mounting among the occupied population." In 2011, American historian Wendy Pearlman described the Village Leagues as "an attempt to formalise [Israel's] network of Palestinian collaborators as an alternative leadership in the rural West Bank. That scheme was met with public disdain and collapsed."

In 2024, Dalal Iriqat of the Arab American University compared the Village Leagues to the Nashashibi family's collaboration with the British Empire during British rule in Palestine, arguing that Israeli policies towards Palestine have followed in "the legacy of the British mandate, with Palestinian self-determination always curtailed by the exercise of military orders and executive power."

Some commentators have also listed the Village Leagues as a factor contributing to the outbreak of the First Intifada in 1987. In 1986, University of North Texas historian Emile Sahliyeh wrote that "although Israel's policy of creating a rural-based alternative Palestinian leadership had failed, it nevertheless undermined the political power of the West Bank nationalist elite." In 1995, Rex Brynen of McGill University argued that the partially successful undermining of the PLO's influence led to a significant increased in more decentralised nationalist leaderships, such as "student, trade union, and women's organizations," which were ultimately more resilient against Israeli suppression and which would "provide much of the organisational underpining for the Intifada."

In a 1985 article in Foreign Policy, former American diplomat Robert G. Neumann warned that the Begin government's efforts to create alternative leadership "may have caused irreperable damage" to hopes of Palestinian moderates emerging, saying that although the Leagues had been scrapped, "no Palestinian today, however moderate, will accept any kind of appointment, be it as a negotiator or as a mayor or local functionary on the West Bank, without PLO approval. And even if individuals could be found, and by some miracle kept alive, they would repreent nobody. Any agreement bearing their signatures would be worthless." Yoav Karny of Israeli newspaper Globes wrote in 2023 that the Village Leagues linked to an Israeli "concept that Islamism is preferable to Arab nationalism," comparing them to the South African Bantustans and saying that the concept "guided Israeli policy for decades, and brought upon us the disaster of October 7."

In 1986, Milson accused the Civil Administration of having "discarded" his approach, accusing both the Israeli Labor Party and Likud of preferring "to focus on anti-terrorism rather than to engage in a larger struggle against the PLO's political influence." In 2016, Yigal Carmon, who had served as an advisor to the Israeli Civil Administration under Menahem, denied that the purpose of creating the Village Leagues was to divide and rule, and claimed that "neither the PLO nor the Arab states nor any of the other hostile elements had been able to overcome them - the Israeli government alone was responsible for their demise, without ever once having discussed the concept, its significance or its prospects."

== Aftermath ==
Milson and Carmon would continue to cooperate, later leading and co-founding the Middle East Media Research Institute, and would continue to comment on the Israeli-Palestinian conflict. Ilya's term as head of the Israeli Civil Administration would prove short, resigning in early 1984 due to a corruption scandal. Sharon would continue to be a prominent figure in Israeli politics, holding other ministerial positions from 1984 to 1992 and again from 1996 to 1999, eventually serving as Prime Minister between 2001 and 2006. In 2020, Dodin's granddaughter, Reema Dodin, would be named deputy director of the White House Office of Legislative Affairs under the Biden administration.

The Israelis hoped that the Village Leagues would diminish nationalist sentiment and influence in Palestine, but they were ultimately unsuccessful. Tensions in the Israeli-Palestinian conflict would continue to rise throughout the 1980s, culminating in the eruption of the First Intifada, a mass wave of strikes and civil disobedience, in 1987. While the Israelis initially responded to the First Intifada with harsh measures, they began direct negotiations with the PLO in the early 1990s, resulting in the Oslo Accords. The 1990s would also mark the rise to prominence of Hamas, a conservative Islamist and nationalist movement, in Palestine and increasing violence in the Israeli-Palestinian conflict. Hamas emerged from the Muslim Brotherhood's network in Palestine, which had also received Israeli support as an alternative to the PLO during the 1970s and early 1980s.

== Legacy ==
=== Influence on future Palestinian leadership structures ===
Motasem Abuzaid of the University of Oxford has argued that "the League experiment significantly influenced later governance models under the Oslo Accords in the 1990s, shaping the collaborative dynamics that underpinned the Palestinian Authority," citing in particular "the transitional phase with no clear final framework and the reliance on local leaders to manage Palestinian affairs under overarching Israeli control. The PA, like the Leagues, was granted limited authority over civil affairs but remained subject to Israeli oversight in security and land management." Israeli civil rights activist Israel Shahak argued in 1997 that "This is the meaning of the Oslo Accord as Israel perceives it: the PLO, or rather a part of Fatah with an absolute loyalty to Yasser Arafat is intended to fulfil the role which the notables performed under Dayan and Village Leagues, under Sharon, but more efficiently." Mark B. Taylor of the Fafo Foundation argued in 2006 that Arafat's leadership of the PA during the 1990s included the "retribalization of Palestinian politics," saying that Arafat's unquestioned nationalist credentials allowed him to more successfully create a Village Leagues-like bureaucracy than the Israeli government in the early 1980s. American-Palestinian writer Ramzy Baroud wrote in 2013 that "history is laden with failed Israeli experiments aimed at destroying the Palestinian national project from within," and accused the Palestinian Authority under Mahmoud Abbas of being "a revamped version of the Village Leagues and their clan-like political apparatus."

During the Gaza war, that began in 2023, some Israeli commentators have proposed creating a clan-based power structure in the Gaza Strip following the war, to replace the Hamas-controlled institutions without involving the Palestinian Authority or other nationalist groups, prompting comparisons to the Village Leagues. Yaniv Voller of the University of Kent argued that "the failure of the Village Leagues may have had much to do with Israeli reluctance to continue the policy as with the unpopularity of the system," claiming that post-war institutions "will only be able to cope with clans’ potential criminal activity through securing their participation in the institutions designed by civilian authorities." Justin Ling of Foreign Policy, however, has argued that "such a plan is likely to fail for the same reason the original incarnation did: because local government cannot be imposed on a population by an occupying power." When news emerged in June 2025 that the Israeli government had been arming the anti-Hamas Popular Forces in Gaza, Israeli writer Yossi Melman compared them to the Village Leagues, describing them as "a mercenary militia similar to the ones established by colonial regimes."

=== In popular culture ===
In 2023, Israeli production company Maagalot Productions released a documentary titled The Village Leagues, telling the story of former Azzun Village League leader Tahsin Mansour.

== See also ==
- Palestinian Emirates Plan
- Israel and state-sponsored terrorism
