= Yigal Carmon =

Israeli intelligence officer and MEMRI co-founder

- יגאל כרמון
- Born: 1946 (age 79–80); Romania
- Military career
- Allegiance: Israel
- Branch: Israel Defense Forces
- Service years: 1968–1988
- Rank: Colonel
- Units: Intelligence Corps
- Other work: Co-founder and president of MEMRI
- Education: Hebrew University of Jerusalem

Yigal Carmon (Hebrew: יגאל כרמון; born 1946) is the president and co-founder of MEMRI, an organization which monitors and translates Arabic and Persian publications, radio and TV broadcasts, and religious sermons into many languages and circulates them over the Internet.

Carmon was a colonel at Aman, the Israeli military intelligence service, and later counter-terrorism advisor to Israeli prime ministers Yitzhak Rabin and Yitzhak Shamir.

== Early life and education ==
Yigal Carmon was born in Romania in 1946 and immigrated to Israel with his family at age four. He grew up in Hadera. In high school, he began to study Arabic, and eventually achieved native-level fluency. At age 18, he had his conscription to the Israel Defense Forces deferred so he could study as part of the Atuda program. After earning a degree in Orientalism from the Hebrew University of Jerusalem, he joined the IDF in 1968 and served in the Intelligence Corps until 1988, reaching the rank of Colonel.

== Career ==
From 1977 to 1981, he served as an adviser on Arab affairs to the Civil Administration in the West Bank and Gaza Strip. When Menahem Milson was appointed to serve as head of the Civil Administration, Carmon was appointed his deputy. During his term as advisor, Carmon helped Milson create the Palestinian Village Leagues as a short-lived, rural and clan based alternative to the Palestine Liberation Organization. Carmon was appointed acting head of the Civil Administration 26 September 1982 after Milson's 22 September resignation. He served in that position until Shlomo Ilya became the Administration's head 29 November.

In 1988, Carmon was appointed adviser on counterterrorism for Prime Minister Yitzhak Shamir. Following the fall of the Shamir government in 1992, he served for a year as Prime Minister Yitzhak Rabin's counterterrorism adviser before resigning in 1993 due to his opposition to the Oslo Accords. From 1991 to 1992 he was also a part of the Israeli delegation to peace negotiations with Syria in Washington.

In 1998, Carmon founded MEMRI.

Carmon has also testified before the US Congress and European parliaments.

== Views ==
=== On reporting "difficult realities" ===
According to Ruthie Blum, writing in the Jerusalem Post, Carmon and MEMRI's translations of material appearing in the Arabic and Persian media, "have been received with a combination of angst and ambivalence on the part of the press and politicians who don't like what they're seeing."

Carmon relates that his experience of portraying difficult realities in the Arab-Muslim world: "In 1994-5, before MEMRI was formally established, I taped TV broadcasts of [Palestinian Authority chairman] Arafat calling for jihad. The reaction to that tape was: 'Kill the messenger'...And I protested by saying, 'But it's not me [calling for jihad]; it's him [Arafat].' To which they replied, 'That doesn't matter.'. Then one day, I asked a very senior journalist with whom I was friendly, 'Why are you criticizing our work? We're merely revealing the truth.' His reply is one I'll never forget: 'There is no such thing as truth,' he said. 'Every news item must be judged by the question of whom it serves. And you are serving the enemies of peace.' Horrified, I retorted, "And you're the one who's considered the reliable journalist, while I'm seen as biased?' So he said, 'If you want to play naive, do it with someone else, not with me. You know I'm right.' 'No,' I said. 'I do not know that you're right. There is such a thing as truth, and it is impartial'

=== On the English version of Al-Jazeera TV ===
"If they copy the Arabic version...into English, then they will be committing suicide. Because the whole world will see what role Al Jazeera is playing in making the Muslim world extreme....[On the other hand, if the two channels were to take different stances on global issues, the organization would be] 'speak[ing] from two sides of its mouth'."

== Criticism ==
Journalist Brian Whitaker in 2002 accused Carmon of presenting false testimony to Congress when he allegedly misrepresented a Gallup poll. Responding to his charge of having an agenda, Carmon wrote "You are right: we do have an agenda. As an institute of research, we want MEMRI to present translations to people who wish to be informed on the ideas circulating in the Middle East. We aim to reflect reality. If knowledge of this reality should benefit one side or another, then so be it."

Regarding Whitaker's criticism of Carmon's "political background", Carmon responded that:

"You continually refer to my supposed "political background" as if I had something to hide, and I wonder if I am your real target here. As a civil servant and adviser on counter-terrorism to both Yitzhak Shamir and Yitzhak Rabin, prime ministers from opposing camps, my role was not a political appointment. If your complaint is that I am Israeli, then please say so."

Carmon also questioned Whitaker's own biases, stating that:

I note your website is "Al-Bab" ("The Gateway" in Arabic). Would I be justified in concluding that you are not, in fact, completely neutral about the Middle East, even though you are Middle East editor of a national newspaper? I wonder how you would judge an editor whose website was called "Ha-Sha-ar" ("The Gateway" in Hebrew)?

Responding to Carmon, Whitaker in the final rejoinder responded, and asked why Carmon had omitted why one of the Arab poet’s identity as a Palestinian had been omitted:

You appear to think this is a trivial matter, but it goes to the heart of Memri's credibility. On any self-respecting newspaper, a reporter who messed about with other people's words like that would be in serious trouble. Again, with your translation of al-Watan's poem, you offer no explanation as to why the only word omitted, between the title and the last line, was the word that identified the poet as a Palestinian rather than an Arab-American.

You say the poet's identity was not the point, but in the context it was clearly relevant.

Once again, I must return to the deeply troubling question of the Gallup poll - which you shrug off with a facetious suggestion about spending $90 on the report.

The fact is that you gave evidence to Congress claiming that Gallup had found "a large majority of the Arab world" who believed the September 11 attacks "were the work of the United States government itself and/or a Jewish conspiracy". What you said is untrue, and Gallup has confirmed that. I trust you will now apologise to Congress for your false testimony. Finally, in the light of your most recent remarks about me personally, I will make clear now that your nationality and religion do not bother me in the slightest. What does concern me is your political agenda, and the deceitful way you go about promoting it.

== Published works ==
- A Pessimist's View of the Peace Process
- Osama vs. Bush on Osama bin Laden and the 2004 US Election
- Madrid Bluff? 11 March 2004 Madrid bombings NOT al Qaeda
