= Palestinian Emirates Plan =

Proposal to divide Palestine into city-states

The Palestinian Emirates Plan is a political proposal that envisions dividing the Palestinian territories – specifically the West Bank and Gaza Strip – into a series of autonomous, city-based entities governed by local clan or municipal leadership, rather than establishing a single centralized Palestinian state. Each city, such as Hebron, Nablus, or Gaza, would function as an independent emirate, managing its own internal affairs including security and economy, while rural areas would be integrated into alternative administrative arrangements, often in coordination with Israel. The plan reflects the notion that governance rooted in traditional tribal or communal structures may offer a more stable alternative to centralized national models, particularly in the context of prolonged political fragmentation, failed peace efforts, and declining trust in existing Palestinian leadership.

== History ==
The Palestinian Emirates Plan emerged in the context of decades of failed peace efforts and growing fragmentation in Palestinian governance. Following the Oslo Accords (1993–95), the Palestinian Authority (PA) was established to administer the West Bank and Gaza. However, the PA has faced persistent challenges, including internal political divisions, most notably the Hamas takeover of Gaza in 2007, corruption, and the absence of a final-status agreement with Israel. Parallel to these developments, traditional clan-based structures have retained influence, particularly in areas like Hebron, where large families often operate independently of the PA. Earlier Israeli efforts to empower clan leaders, such as the promotion of the Village Leagues in the 1980s over the elected city councils and the National Guidance Committee, failed amid widespread Palestinian opposition and loyalty to the national project led by the Palestine Liberation Organization (PLO).

The emirates concept was later popularized by Israeli scholar Mordechai Kedar, who has advocated an “eight-state solution” since 2012. Kedar’s plan is based on the premise that Middle Eastern society is organized primarily along tribal and clan lines, and that Western-style nation-states have failed in the region when they encompass multiple rival groups. He points to the relative stability of Gulf emirates ruled by single families (e.g. Kuwait, Qatar, the UAE) in contrast to the internal strife in multi-ethnic states like Syria, Iraq, Lebanon, Libya, or Yemen. Accordingly, the plan envisions breaking Palestinian society into city-based emirates governed by local clans, each exercising self-rule over a city and its surrounding area. Proposed emirates include the Gaza Strip, as well as major West Bank population centers such as Jenin, Nablus, Ramallah, Jericho, Tulkarm, Qalqilya, and the Arab parts of Hebron, all locales where traditional clan leadership remains influential. Under this framework, each emirate would manage its own affairs – from security to economy – potentially coordinating through a council, while Israel would retain overall security control between these enclaves. The plan rejects the idea of a unified Palestinian national government, arguing that a loose federation of city-emirates aligns better with historical tribal identities and could produce more stable governance.

== The Emirate of Hebron Initiative (2025) ==
In July 2025, five prominent sheikhs from Hebron, led by Sheikh Wadee’ al-Jaabari, proposed forming an independent “Emirate of Hebron” separate from the Palestinian Authority (PA). In a letter to Israeli Economy Minister Nir Barkat, they expressed their desire to normalize relations with Israel and join the Abraham Accords. The letter recognized Israel as the Jewish nation-state and called on Israel to recognize the emirate as the legitimate representative of Hebron’s Arab population. The sheikhs described this arrangement as a replacement for the Oslo Accords, which they claimed brought only “damage, death, and economic disaster.”

The proposal included practical steps: a pledge to reject terrorism, halt incitement, and promote coexistence. They requested thousands of Israeli work permits for Hebron residents and proposed a joint industrial zone. Sheikh Jaabari cited the October 7, 2023 Hamas attacks as proof that the dream of a Palestinian state was no longer realistic. He argued that local clan leadership offers a more stable alternative, positioning Hebron as a potential success story akin to Dubai. The initiative highlighted Hebron’s strong clan-based social structure, claiming legitimacy as “authentic leadership” in contrast to the corrupt and ineffective PA. The sheikhs accused both the PA and Hamas of failing their people and voiced hope that Israeli and international backing could help Hebron thrive.

== Reactions and controversy ==
The "Hebron emirate proposal" triggered strong backlash among Palestinians and across the Arab world. The Palestinian Authority (PA) initially remained silent, possibly hoping to minimize attention, while unofficial responses were scathing. A statement from Hebron families, circulated through Fatah channels, likened the plan to Israel’s failed Village Leagues and condemned it as a betrayal of the national cause. A faction of the Ja’abari clan publicly disavowed Sheikh Wadee’ al-Jaabari, reaffirming support for a Palestinian state with Jerusalem as its capital. Hamas also denounced the move as normalization with the occupation.

Arab media broadly echoed these criticisms, portraying the plan as an Israeli attempt to divide Palestinians. Outlets such as Middle East Eye reported widespread local rejection of the idea. Analysts warned of parallels to similar efforts in Gaza, where suspected collaborators faced violent reprisals.

== Analysis and implications ==
The Palestinian Emirates Plan, particularly the Hebron initiative, has sparked debate over Palestinian identity, the future of the two-state solution, and Israel's conflict strategy. Supporters argue that it offers a pragmatic alternative to stalled diplomacy and a fractured Palestinian leadership. They believe empowering local clans could enhance stability, citing Israel’s ongoing control over much of the West Bank and the Hebron sheikhs’ pledge to reject violence as potential models for coexistence. Some also view this localized approach as complementary to the Abraham Accords.

Critics, however, see the plan as a threat to Palestinian national unity, accusing it of fragmenting the population into city-states under Israeli dominance. They warn it undermines decades of struggle for self-determination and risks internal conflict, with clan rivalries potentially erupting into violence. The plan is seen as bypassing key issues such as borders, refugees, and Jerusalem, effectively entrenching occupation. It has received little international support outside of select Israeli and American right-wing circles, with the global consensus still favoring a negotiated two-state solution. The plan has been compared by critics to the South African Bantustans, in which the "emirates" would be nominally autonomous but completely controlled by Israel.
