= Israeli Civil Administration =

Governing body in the West Bank

Civil Administration המנהל האזרחי Ha-Minhal ha-ʿEzraḥi الإدارة المدنية الإسرائيلية
- 1981–1994 (direct governance role) 1994–present (indirect governance role)
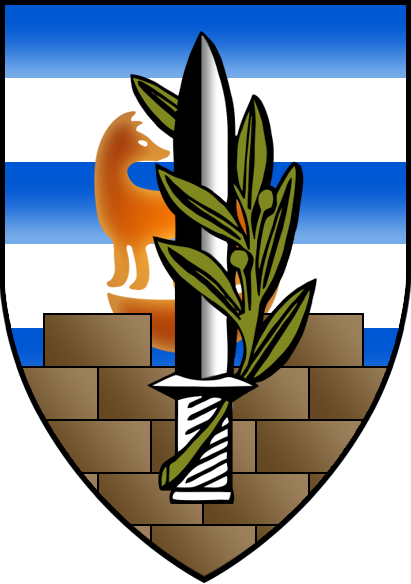
- Coat of arms

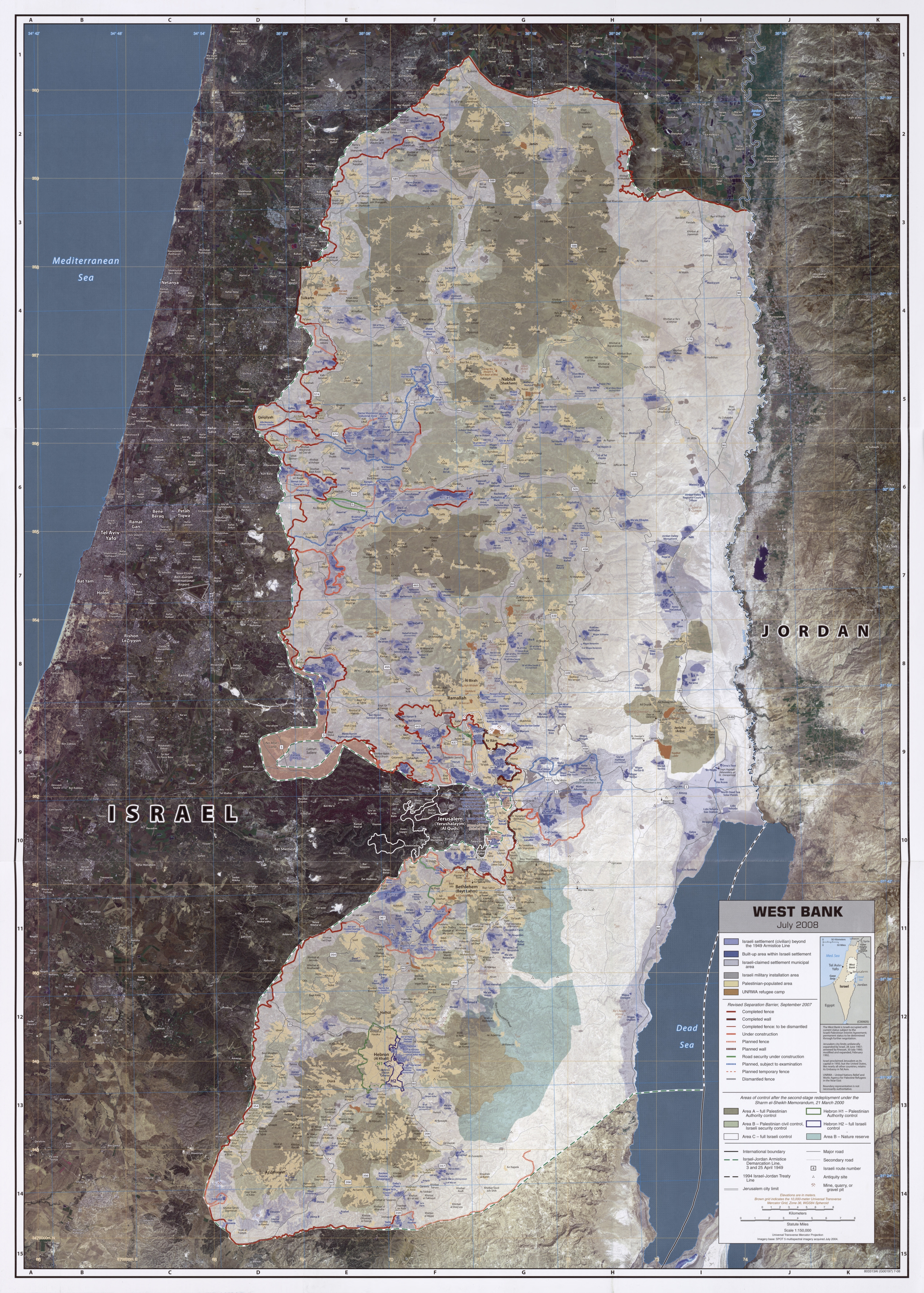
- Map of the West Bank that is under authority of the Civil Administration. Israel ended exercise of political authority over the Gaza Strip in 2005.
- Capital: Beit El
- Common languages: Hebrew (state language, language of Jewish population), Arabic (language of Arab population)
- Government: Military-related governance
- Head of the Civil Administration
- History
  - Israeli Military Order Number 947: 1981
  - Oslo Accords: 1994 (end of direct governance role)
- Currency: Israeli shekel (NIS)
Preceded by	Succeeded by
Israeli Military Governorate	Palestinian National Authority

The Civil Administration (Hebrew: המנהל האזרחי, ha-Minhal ha-ʿEzraḥi; Arabic: الإدارة المدنية الإسرائيلية) is the Israeli governing body that operates in the West Bank. It was established by the government of Israel in 1981, in order to carry out practical bureaucratic functions within the territories captured by Israel in 1967. While formally separate, it was subordinate to the Israeli military.

The Civil Administration is subordinate to a larger entity known as the Coordinator of Government Activities in the Territories, which is a unit in the Defense Ministry of Israel. Among its functions are coordination with the Palestinian Authority. After 2002, the distinction set forth in the Oslo Accords restricting Israeli military operations in area A was de facto terminated.

== Formation, background and nature ==
The creation of a civil administration for the West Bank and Gaza Strip was incorporated within the Camp David Accords, signed by Egypt and Israel in 1978. The Civil Administration intended to exchange the military government Israel had established in 1967. The Camp David Accords did not include the Palestine Liberation Organization (PLO) in the talks over issues of the Palestinian-claimed territories.

A modification which preceded the actual creation of the body was a change in the "chain of command", consolidating power within the military.

The nature of this body was defined in Military Order No. 947, by the 1981 military government of the West Bank and Gaza:

"We hereby establish a Civil Administration in the region [West Bank]. The Civil Administration shall run all regional civil matters, correspondingly to this [Military] decree, for the wellbeing and for the sake of [local] population, and with the purpose of providing and operating the public services, considering the need to maintain a proper governance and public order".

After the creation of the Civil Administration, civil affairs were not separated with the military. While all the civil branches came under the control of the Civil Administration and did not have to report to the military, in practice, the Civil Administration was subordinate to the military and the Shin Bet. At the managerial level, most of the staffers were Israelis. The internal security service Shin Bet was also deeply involved behind the scenes. Thomas Friedman describes it as a "euphemism for military administration", and it was deeply suspected by Palestinians, who led waves of protests against it. Twenty-five West Bank mayors called for its abolition; the Israeli military arrested the rioters and suppressed the protests.

The military's role extended to appointments, licenses and permits, and legislative powers. The Civil Administration was used as a front to dispense patronage among the occupied population. There was an attempt to create Village Leagues by Menachem Milson in 1978, who later became the head of the Civil Administration. The Village Leagues consisted of "a coalition of rural thugs...who had no standing in the community". The Palestinians saw the Leagues as a collection of collaborators and traitors. Political factions and the PLO were outlawed by the Israeli military, with a conscious policy of "divide and rule". This policy of co-optation was combined with "Iron Fist" operations of the then Defense Minister, Ariel Sharon.

=== Later developments ===
Through the implementation of the Oslo Accords agreed upon by Israel and the PLO, the Civil Administration transferred some of its governance capacities to the Palestinian National Authority in 1994. Since 1994, the Civil Administration has largely focused on matters involving the issuing of movement permits. Upon the implementation of Israel's unilateral disengagement plan from the Gaza Strip in 2005, the Civil Administration has exercised authority exclusively in the West Bank.

== Activities ==
The Israel Defense Forces description of the mandate of the Civil Administration purports that "the unit acts as a source of information integrating human quality and technological progress which coordinates activities of government bureaus, the IDF, and security establishments opposite the Palestinians through the application of government policies in factors pertaining to civilians. Additionally, the "MATPASH" Unit promotes humanitarian issues, infrastructure projects, and economical projects."

The Civil Administration is practically a "counterpart" of the Interior Ministry of Israel, and operates with its nine Israeli – District Coordination Offices (DCO), operating in the West Bank. The Civil Administration is responsible for all administrative aspects of the local population within Area C of the West Bank, and is responsible for coordinating with the Palestinian Authority, which has full administrative authority in Area A, and limited authority in Area B, as per the Oslo Accords. After 2002, with Operation Defensive Shield, the agreement in the Oslo Accords disallowing Israeli military operations in Area A was effectively abolished by the latter. The only part of the West Bank which the IDF does not enter is the Palestinian Presidential compound, the Mukataa inside Ramallah. As a working rule, the Palestinian security forces are left to operate by day, and Israeli raids take place in this area during the night. Among other things, it is responsible for the entrance permits from the West Bank to Israel, travel permits within the West Bank, and work permits (for Palestinians seeking to enter from the West Bank to Israel in order to work). It also decides on matters concerning the approval of new and already built housing units in settlements. The Civil Administration that operates as part of the Coordinator of Government Activities in the Territories (COGAT) unit receives its budget from the Israeli government.
