= Stratocracy =

Government administered by military forces

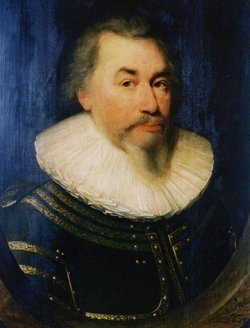
Portrait of Robert Filmer, the first person to use the term stratocracy in English.

A stratocracy is a form of government headed by military chiefs. The branches of government are administered by military forces, the government is legal under the laws of the jurisdiction at issue, and is usually carried out by military workers.

== Etymology ==
The word "stratocracy" comes from Ancient Greek στρατός (stratós) 'army' and κράτος (krátos) 'dominion, power'.

== Description of stratocracy ==
The word stratocracy first appeared in 1652 from the political theorist Robert Filmer, being preceded in 1649 by stratokratia used by Claudius Salmasius in reference to the newly declared Commonwealth of England. According to the 19th century American jurist, John Bouvier, a stratocracy is where citizens with mandatory or voluntary military service, or veterans who have been honorably discharged, have the right to elect or govern. In stratocracies the military runs the administrative, judicial, and/or legislative branches of government, as supported by the law, the constitution, and the society.

A stratocracy does not necessarily need to be autocratic or oligarchic by nature in order to preserve its right to rule. The political scientist Samuel Finer distinguished between stratocracies, where the army takes decisions and rules directly, and military regimes or dictatorships, where the army does not itself rule but instead is tasked with the primary responsibility of enforcing and defending the rule of civil leaders who set the policies of the state and control the activities of the military. Peter Lyon wrote that through history stratocracies have been relatively rare, and that in the latter half of the twentieth century there has been a noticeable increase in the number of stratocratic states due to the "rapid collapse of the West European thalassocracies".

== Notable examples of stratocracies ==
=== Historical stratocracies ===
==== Sparta ====
The Diarchy of Sparta was a stratocratic kingdom. From a young age, male Spartans were put through the agoge, necessary for full-citizenship, which was a rigorous education and training program to prepare them for war. Aristotle describes the kingship of Sparta as "a kind of unlimited and perpetual generalship" (Pol. iii. 1285a), while Isocrates refers to the Spartans as "subject to an oligarchy at home, to a kingship on campaign" (iii. 24).

==== Rome ====
One of the most notable and long-lived examples of a stratocratic state is Ancient Rome, though the stratocratic system developed over time. Following the deposition of the last Roman king Lucius Tarquinius Superbus, Rome became a republic. However, with the gradual expansion of the empire and conflicts with its rival Carthage, culminating in the Punic Wars, the Roman political and military system experienced drastic changes. Following the so-called "Marian reforms", de facto political power became concentrated under military leadership, as the loyalty of the legionaries shifted from the Senate to its generals.

Under the First Triumvirate and during the subsequent civil wars, militarism influenced the formation of the Roman Empire, the head of which was acclaimed as "Imperator", previously an honorary title for distinguished military commanders. The Roman army either approved of or acquiesced in the accession of every Roman emperor, with the Praetorian Guard having a decisive role in Imperial succession until Emperor Constantine abolished it. Militarization of the Empire increased over time and emperors were increasingly beholden to their armies and fleets, yet how active emperors were in actually commanding in the field in military campaigns varied from emperor to emperor, even from dynasty to dynasty. The vital political importance of the army persisted up until the destruction of the Eastern (Byzantine) Empire with the fall of Constantinople in 1453.

==== Goryeo ====
From 1170 to 1270, the kingdom of Goryeo was under effective military rule, with puppet kings on the throne serving mainly as figureheads. The majority of this period was spent under the rule of the Choe family, who set up a parallel system of private administrative systems from their military forces.

==== Cossacks ====
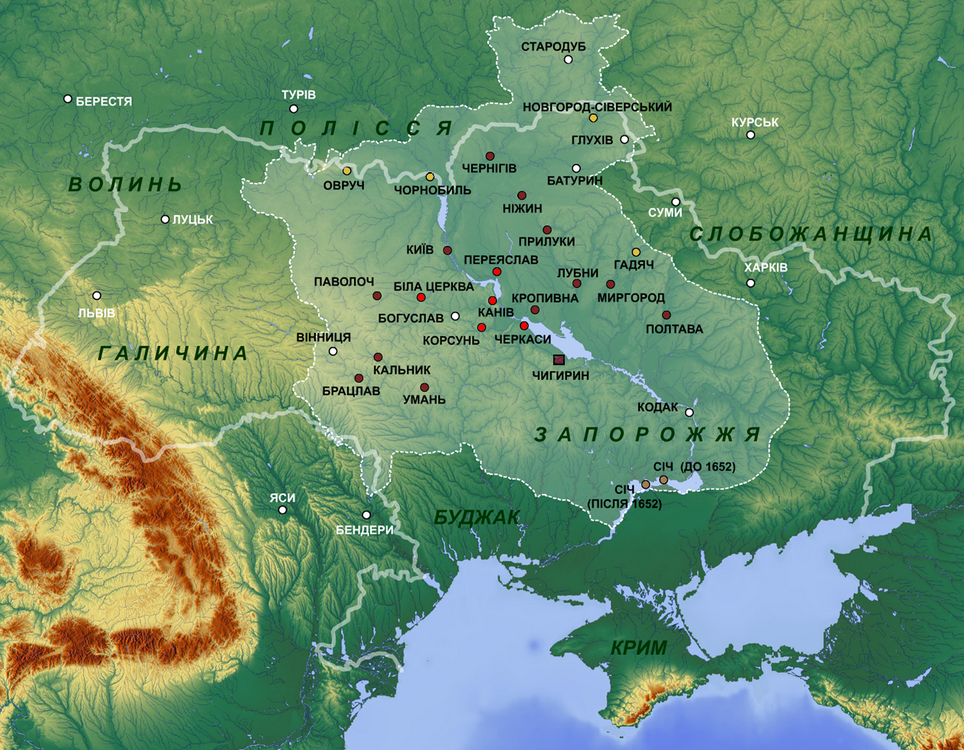
The Zaporizhian Cossack host in 1654 (against the backdrop of contemporary Ukraine)

Cossacks were predominantly East Slavic people who became known as members of democratic, semi-military and semi-naval communities, predominantly located in Ukraine and in Southern Russia. They inhabited sparsely populated areas and islands in the lower Dnieper, Don, Terek, and Ural river basins, and played an important role in the historical and cultural development of both Russia and Ukraine. The Zaporozhian Sich was a Cossack semi-autonomous polity and proto-state that existed between the 16th and 18th centuries, and existed as an independent stratocratic state as the Cossack Hetmanate for over a hundred years.

==== Military frontier of the Habsburg monarchy ====
The Military Frontier was a borderland of the Habsburg monarchy (which became the Austrian Empire and later the Austro-Hungarian Empire). The military frontier acted as the cordon sanitaire against incursions from the Ottoman Empire. Located in the southern part of Hungarian crown land, the frontier was separated from local jurisdiction and was under direct Viennese central military administration from the 1500s to 1872. Unlike the rest of the Catholic dominated territory of the empire, the frontier area had relatively freer religious laws in order to attract settlements into the area.

==== Regency of Algiers ====
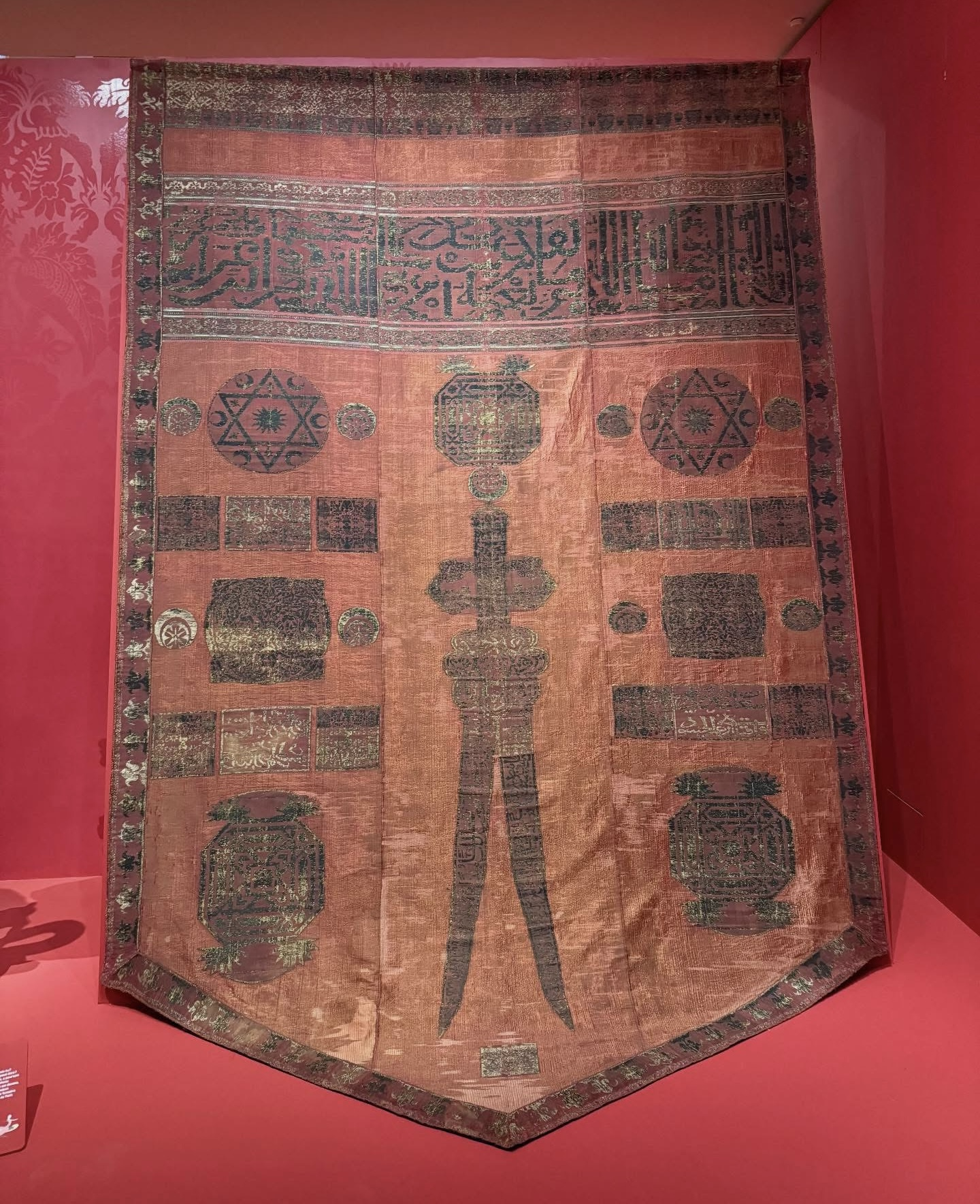
Banner of the Dey of Algiers, Victor Hugo museum, Paris.

The Regency of Algiers was one of the most prominent and long-lasting examples of a stratocracy in history. Founded by the legendary Barbarossa brothers (Aruj and Hayreddin Reis), the Regency was a semi-independent Ottoman province that functioned as a military state on the Barbary Coast of North Africa. Its ruling elite consisted of two intertwined military castes: the corsair captains' guild, known as taife reisi (privateers, often including European renegades) and the Janissaries, who formed a professional Ottoman infantry and the core of the land forces. This hybrid warrior oligarchy was hierarchical and martial, yet with republican elements of election and council deliberation. The corsairs provided the naval striking force and wealth, while the Janissaries ensured internal control and land defense. Together, they formed the ruling class, distinct from the local Arab-Berber population, though they often allied with maraboutic (religious) orders and granted significant autonomy to interior tribes.

Algiers operated with significant autonomy; a pivotal Janissary Revolution in 1659 marked the full emergence of the stratocracy. The Janissaries overthrew the system of Ottoman-appointed pashas, and power shifted to a military republic governed by the Diwan (council), a body dominated by high-ranking officers from both the Janissaries and the corsairs. The ruler, known as the Dey, was elected by the Diwan rather than appointed by the Sultan.

The Regency's economy and power rested heavily on maritime jihad (ghazi warfare) and organized piracy. Corsair fleets raided European shipping, captured slaves for ransom or labor (the Barbary slave trade peaked in the 16th–17th centuries), seized booty, and extracted tribute from weaker states. This war economy funded the state, enriched the elite, and made Algiers a feared Mediterranean power often called "the scourge of Christendom" in Europe.

=== Modern stratocracies ===
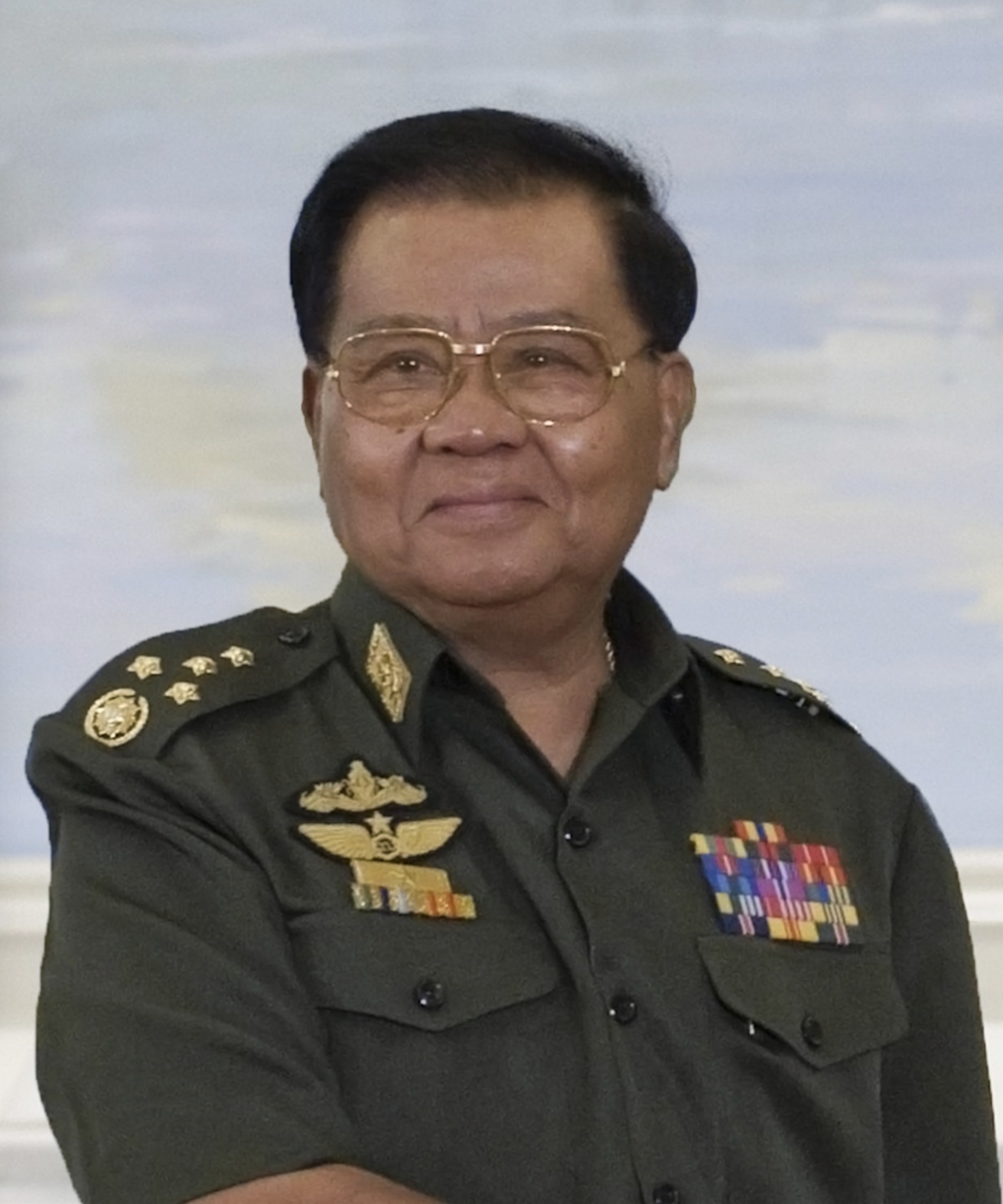
Senior General Than Shwe who was the Chairman of the State Peace and Development Council from 1992 to 2011.

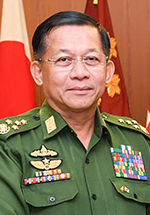
Senior General Min Aung Hlaing, who became Chairman of the State Administration Council with the 2021 Myanmar coup d'état.

The State Peace and Development Council of Myanmar (Burma), which ruled from 1997 to 2011, has been called a stratocracy, and arguably differed from most other military dictatorships in that it completely abolished the civilian constitution and legislature. A new constitution that came into effect in 2010 cemented the Tatmadaw's hold on power through mechanisms such as reserving 25% of the seats in the legislature for military personnel.

The civilian constitutional government was dissolved again in the 2021 Myanmar coup d'état, led by Min Aung Hlaing, with power being transferred back to the Tatmadaw through the State Administration Council.

== States argued to be stratocratic ==
=== United States ===
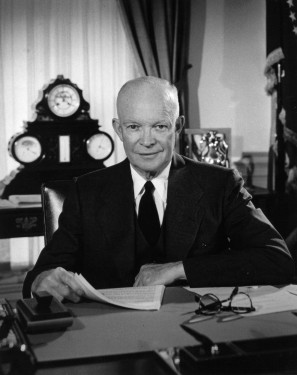
US President Dwight D. Eisenhower famously warned of a "military–industrial complex" in his farewell address.

The political scientist Harold Lasswell wrote in 1941 of his concerns that the world was moving towards "a world of 'garrison states'" with the United States of America being one of the countries moving in that direction. This was supported by the historian Richard Kohn in 1975 commenting on the US's creation of a military state during its early independence, and by the political scientist Samuel Fitch in 1985. The historian Eric Hobsbawm has used the existence and power of the military-industrial complex in the US as evidence of it being a stratocratic state. The expansion and prioritisation of the military during the administrations of Reagan and H. W. Bush have also been described as signs of stratocracy in the US. The futurist Paul Saffo and the researcher Robert Marzec have argued that the post 9/11 projection of the United States was trending towards stratocracy.

=== USSR ===
The philosopher and economist Cornelius Castoriadis wrote in his 1980 text, Facing the War, that Russia had become the primary world military power. To sustain this, in the context of the visible economic inferiority of the Soviet Union in the civilian sector, he proposed that the society may no longer be dominated by the one-party state bureaucracy of the Communist Party but by a "stratocracy", describing it as a separate and dominant military sector with expansionist designs on the world. He further argued that this meant there was no internal class dynamic that could lead to social revolution within Russian society and that change could only occur through foreign intervention. Historian Richard I. Frank agreed highlighting similarities in the development of the administrative organs and mechanisms between the USSR and Rome in late antiquity. With political scientist Timothy Luke stating that under the secretaryship of Mikhail Gorbachev the USSR was moving towards a stratocratic state.

=== African states ===
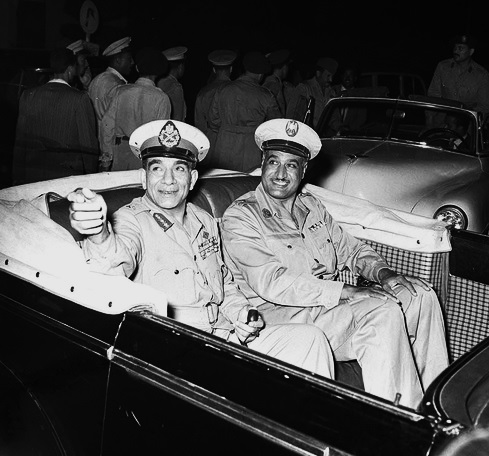
Gamal Abdel Nasser (right) and Mohamed Naguib (left) during celebrations marking the second anniversary of the 1952 revolution, July 1954

Various countries in post-colonial Africa have been described as stratocracies. The Republic of Egypt under the leadership of Nasser was described by the political theorist P. J. Vatikiotis as a stratocratic state. The recent Egyptian governments since the Arab Spring, including that of Abdel Fattah el-Sisi, have also been called stratocratic. David George commented in a 1988 paper that the military dictatorship of Idi Amin in Uganda and the apartheid regime in South Africa should be considered stratocracies. Various previous Nigerian governments have been described as stratocratic in research, including the government under Olusegun Obasanjo, and the Armed Forces Ruling Council led by Ibrahim Babangida. Under the 1978 constitution of Eswatini Sobhuza II appointed the Swazi army commander as the country's prime minister, and the second-in-command of the army as the head of the civil service board. This fusing of military and civil power continued in subsequent appointments, with many of the appointees viewing their civil roles as secondary to their military positions. Ghana under Jerry Rawlings has also been described as being stratocratic in nature. Karl Marx's term of barracks socialism was retermed by the political scientist Michel Martin in their description of socialist stratocracies in the Middle East, Latin America, and Africa, including specifically the People's Republic of Benin. Martin also believes the praetorianism of francophone African republics can be called stratocratic, including the Côte d'Ivoire and the Central African Republic.

=== Other ===
The French historian François Raguenet wrote in 1691 of the stratocracy of Oliver Cromwell in the Protectorate, and commented that he thought that William III of England was seeking to revive the stratocracy in England.

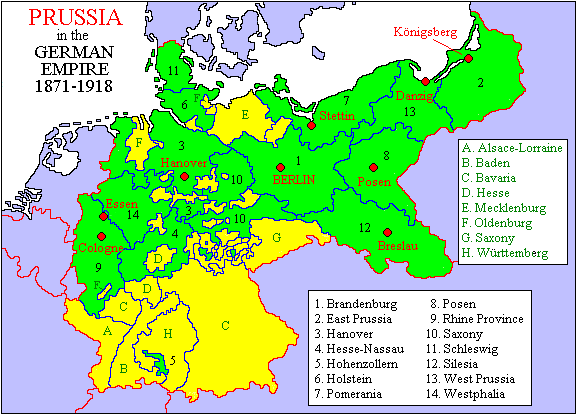
Prussia in the German Empire from 1871 to 1918

The Prussian military writer Georg Henirich von Berenhorst wrote in hindsight that ever since the reign of the soldier king, Prussia always remained "not a country with an army, but an army with a country" (a quote often misattributed to Voltaire and Honoré Gabriel Riqueti, comte de Mirabeau). It has been argued the subsequent dominance of the Kingdom of Prussia in the North German Confederation and German Empire and the expansive militarism in their administrations and policies, saw a continuance of the stratocratic Prussian government.

Historian Christina Welsch argues that Company rule in India can be understood as stratocratic, highlighting the growing power of the company armies leading up to the 1809 Madras mutiny which saw as its consequence an entrenching of military officials in Company government positions. In response to the mutiny and its consequences civil officials referred to the increased power of the military in government matters as "in effect a Stratocracy (the worst of all Governments)".

British commentators such as Richard Francis Burton described the pre-Tanzimat Ottoman Empire as a stratocratic state.

The Warlord Era of China is viewed as period of stratocratic struggles with the researcher Peng Xiuliang pointing to the actions and policies of Wang Shizhen, a general and politician of the Republic of China, as an example of the stratocratic forces within the Chinese government of the time.

Occupied Poland in World War I was put under the General-Militärgouvernementen (general military governments) of Germany and Austria-Hungary. This government was a stratocratic system where the military was responsible for the political administration of Poland.

Various military juntas of Central and South America have also been described as stratocracies.

Political scientist Samuel Finer argued that of the military regimes that existed in 1980, 16 could be considered to be stratocracies. These were Algeria under Chadli Bendjedid, Argentina, People's Republic of Benin, Burundi under Jean-Baptiste Bagaza, Chile, People's Republic of the Congo, Equatorial Guinea, Ethiopia, Libya, Mali under Moussa Traoré, Mauritania, Niger under Seyni Kountché, Rwanda under Juvénal Habyarimana, Somalia under Siad Barre, Uruguay, and the Yemen Arab Republic under Ali Abdullah Saleh.

Since 1967, the Israeli occupation of the West Bank, East Jerusalem (both taken from Jordan), Sinai Peninsula, Gaza Strip (taken from Egypt) and the Golan Heights (taken from Syria) after the Six-Day War can be argued to have been under stratocratic rule. While the West Bank and Gaza were governed by the Israeli Military Governorate and Civil Administration which was later given to the Palestinian National Authority that governs the Palestinian territories, only East Jerusalem and the Golan Heights were annexed into Israeli territory from 1980 which is still internationally unrecognized and once referred to these territories by the United Nations as occupied Arab territories. Various commentators have also described the broader State of Israel as being stratocratic including Director of the United Arab Emirates' Institute of Diplomacy Yousef Elhassan and Greek anarchist Dimitris Chatzivasileiadis.

== Fictional stratocracies ==
Stratocratic forms of government have been popular in fictional stories.

The country of Amestris in the Fullmetal Alchemist manga and anime series is a nominal parliamentary republic without elections, where parliament has been used as a façade to distract from the authoritarian regime, as the government is almost completely centralized by the military, and the majority of government positions are occupied by military personnel. In Bryan Konietzko and Michael Dante DiMartino's Avatar: The Last Airbender, the Earth Kingdom is very divided and during the Hundred Year War relies on an unofficial confederal stratocratic rule of small towns to maintain control from the Fire Nation's military, without the Earth Monarch's assistance. The five members of Greater Turkiye in the manga and anime Altair: A Record of Battles are called stratocracies, with them being based on the Ottoman Empire.

The Cardassian Union of the Star Trek universe can be described as a stratocracy, with a constitutionally and socially sanctioned, as well as a politically dominant military that nonetheless has immense totalitarian characteristics. The Galactic Empire from the original Star Wars trilogy can be described as a stratocracy. Although ruled by the Sith through its Emperor, Sheev Palpatine, known secretly as Darth Sidious, the functioning of the entire government was controlled by the military and explicitly sanctioned by its leaders. All sectors were controlled by a Moff or Grand Moff who were also high-ranking military officers. The Global Defense Initiative from the Command & Conquer franchise is another example: initially being a United Nations task force to combat the Brotherhood of Nod and research the alien substance Tiberium, later expanding to a worldwide government led by military leaders after the collapse of society due to Tiberium's devastating effects on Earth. The Turian Hierarchy of Mass Effect is another example of a fictional stratocracy, where the civilian and military populations cannot be distinguished, and the government and the military are the same, and strongly meritocratic, with designated responsibilities for everyone.

In Robert A. Heinlein's Starship Troopers, the Terran Federation was set up by a group of military veterans in Aberdeen, Scotland when governments collapsed following a world war. While national service is voluntary, earning citizenship in the Federation requires civilians to "enroll in the Federal Service of the Terran Federation for a term of not less than two years and as much longer as may be required by the needs of the Service." While Federal Service is not exclusively military service, that appears to be the dominant form. It is believed that only those willing to sacrifice their lives on the state's behalf are fit to govern. While the government is a representative democracy, the franchise is only granted to people who have completed service, mostly in the military, due to this law (active military can neither vote nor serve in political/non-military offices).

Professor of English Joseph Young has detailed how in George R. R. Martin's series A Song of Ice and Fire, all polities in Westoros are ruled by military leadership, forming stratocracies.

== See also ==
- Junta (governing body)
- Militarism
- Military government:
  - Military dictatorship
  - Military junta
  - Military occupation
- Political strongman
