= Israeli Military Governorate =

Military governance system (1967–1981/82)

Israeli Military Governorate הַמִמְשָׁל הַצֹּבְאִי Ha-Memšal Ha-Tsvaʾi
- 1967–1982
- Flag Coat of arms

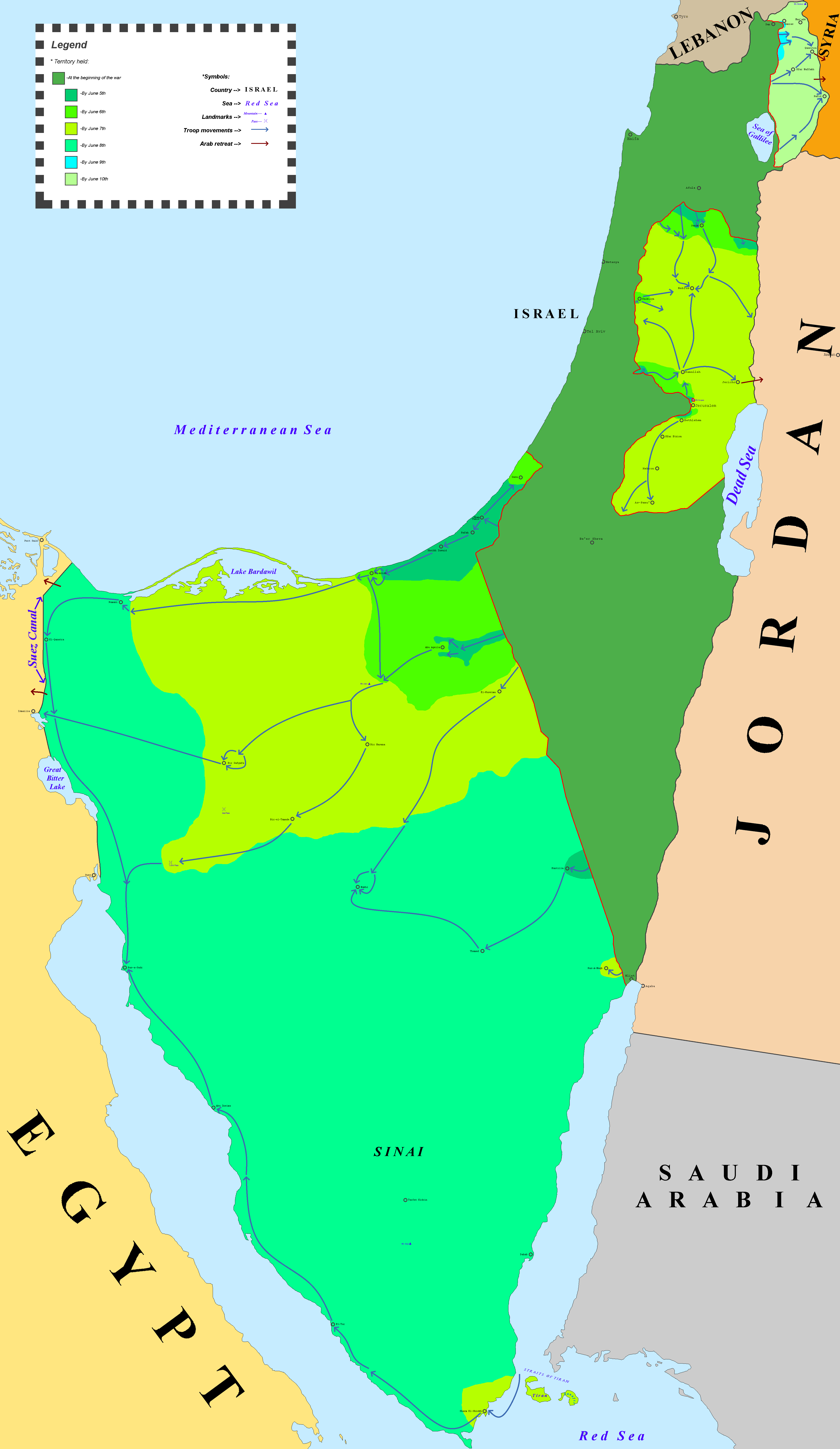
- A map of territories occupied by Israel are shown in various shades of light green were subject to Israeli Military Governorate as Occupied Arab Territories.
- Common languages: Hebrew (official), Arabic
- Government: Military government
- Commander of the Military Governorate
- History
  - End of Six-Day War: 10 June 1967
  - Implementation of Egypt–Israel peace treaty: 1982
- Currency: Israeli lira
Preceded by
| Jordanian annexation of the West Bank |
| Egyptian occupation of the Gaza Strip |
| North Sinai Governorate |
| South Sinai Governorate |
| Quneitra Governorate (Syria) |
Succeeded by
| Israeli Civil Administration |
| Northern District (Israel) |
| North Sinai Governorate |
| South Sinai Governorate |

The Israeli Military Governorate (Hebrew: הַמִמְשָׁל הַצֹּבְאִי, lit. 'The Military Rule') was a military governance system established following the Six-Day War in June 1967, in order to govern the civilian population of the West Bank, the Gaza Strip, the Sinai Peninsula and the western part of Golan Heights. The governance was based on the Fourth Geneva Convention, which provides guidelines for military rule in occupied areas. East Jerusalem was the only exception from this order, and it was added to Jerusalem municipal area as early as 1967, and extending Israeli law to the area effectively annexing it in 1980. During this period, the UN and many sources referred to the military governed areas as Occupied Arab Territories.

The Egypt–Israel peace treaty led Israel to give up the Sinai Peninsula in 1982 and transform the military rule in the Gaza Strip and the West Bank into the Israeli Civil Administration in 1981. The Western part of Golan Heights was unilaterally annexed by Israel from Syria the same year, thus abolishing the Military Governorate system entirely.

== Establishment ==
The Six-Day War began on June 5, 1967, with Israel launching surprise strikes against Egyptian air-fields in response to the mobilization of Egyptian forces on the Israeli border. A period of high tension had preceded the war. In response to PLO sabotage acts against Israeli targets, Israel raided into the Jordanian-controlled West Bank and initiated flights over Syria, which ended with aerial clashes over Syrian territory, Syrian artillery attacks against Israeli civilian settlements in the vicinity of the border followed by Israeli responses against Syrian positions in the Golan Heights and encroachments of increasing intensity and frequency into the demilitarized zones along the Syrian border, and culminating in Egypt blocking the Straits of Tiran, deploying its troops near Israel's border, and ordering the evacuation of the U.N. buffer force from the Sinai Peninsula.

Within six days, Israel had won a decisive land war. Israeli forces had taken control of the Gaza Strip and the Sinai Peninsula from Egypt, the West Bank, including East Jerusalem, from Jordan, and the Golan Heights from Syria. The resulting expansion of territory led to the establishment of a military government on those territories to run the affairs of Arab populations falling under Israeli military rule. Overall, Israel's territory grew by a factor of three, including about one million Arabs placed under Israel's direct control in the newly captured territories. Israel's strategic depth grew to at least 300 kilometers in the south, 60 kilometers in the east, and 20 kilometers of extremely rugged terrain in the north, a security asset that would prove useful in the Yom Kippur War six years later.

== Governance ==
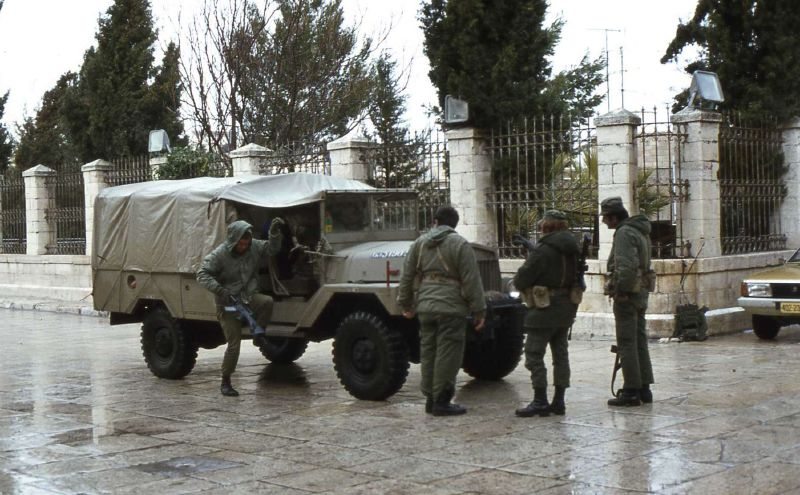
Israeli soldiers in Bethlehem (Israeli Military Governorate) in 1978.

Effectively, from June 1967, Israel has exercised military rule in subjected territories of the West Bank, Gaza Strip, Sinai Peninsula and Golan Heights, based on the Fourth Geneva Convention, which specifies international law for military rule in occupied areas. East Jerusalem was the only exception from this order, and it was effectively added to Jerusalem municipal area as early as 1967, and extending Israeli law to the area (effectively annexing it).

== Dissolution ==
The military government's authority was effectively cancelled with the Egypt–Israel peace treaty, which led it to give up the Sinai Peninsula in 1982 and rename the military rule in the Gaza Strip and the West Bank as the Israeli Civil Administration in 1981, which is run by the Israeli Ministry of Defense. The creation of a civil administration for the West Bank and Gaza Strip was included within the Camp David Accords signed by Egypt and Israel in 1978. The nature of this civil administration body was defined in Military Order No. 947, by the 1981 military government of the West Bank and Gaza. The Western part of Golan Heights was effectively annexed to Israel the same year, thus abolishing the Military Governorate system entirely.

== The West Bank ==
Even before the end of the 1967 June War, Israel invested all "powers of government, legislature, appointment and administration in relation to the region or its inhabitants" in the hands of the Military Governor. General Chaim Herzog announced on 7 June 1967, that all previously existing laws would remain in force, save in cases where they conflicted with the rights of Israel as Occupying Power to ensure security for both its forces and public order. Israel justified the retention of what it considered the Jordanian maintenance of British occupation regulations, believing them consonant with Article 64 of the Fourth Geneva Convention, which properly concern the treatment by a hostile power of the occupied population. The Jordanian position is that Israel is not heir to its laws in this regard in that they were abolished decades earlier. Called on to adjudicate between competing claims, the United Nations, in its Special Committee Report of 1970, stated that the Mandatory Defence (Emergency) Regulations of 1945, which the British themselves subsequently repealed, did not constitute a warrant for applying them to the Palestinian Territories since they were invalid, in conflicting with the protocols of the Fourth Geneva Convention. (Note: Report of the Special Committee to Investigate Israeli Practices Affecting Human Rights of the Population of the Occupied Territories, Palestine International Documents on Human Rights 1948-1972., UN General Assembly, 26 October 1970, UN Doc. A/8089, p. 19.)

The Israeli Military Governorate instituted to rule the territories was dissolved in 1982 and replaced by the Israeli Civil Administration, which is actually an arm of the Israeli army. Set up in November 1981 under military order no. 947, it has a mandate which stipulates that the function of the body is to "administer the civil affairs in the area [West Bank]... for the welfare and benefit of the population and for provision and operation of public services, considering the need to maintain proper administration and public order in the area." The creation of this new body unleashed a wave of protest in the first few months of 1982, repressing which caused more Palestinian casualties than had occurred in the preceding 15 years of occupation. From 1967 to 2014, the Israeli administration issued over 1,680 military orders regarding the West Bank. Though formally the IDF was obliged to be neutral, it was drawn into the politics of the conflict, caught between the administration of the occupied people and the defense of settlements, which were originally thought of as a military burden whose defense should be left to the settlers, but whose early militias were salaried, trained, and furnished with arms by the IDF, which now operates to defend them.

By the time of the Oslo Accords, 47% of West Bankers were refugees, and 11% of the total population dwelt in refugee camps. As part of Ariel Sharon's strategy, the Civil Administration had extended to all areas of the West Bank the Village Leagues (rawabit al-qura) originally developed only for the Hebron area in 1978. These were used to circumvent direct political representation. Elections themselves, even for union officials, had been banned in the wake of the 1976 municipal elections which turned in an overwhelming majority of nationalist candidates, and most of the mayors where eventually dismissed, with some suffering deportation. The Village Leagues by contrast were supposed to resolve disputes and promote rural development, but stoked peasant resentments against Palestinian urban centres and were manned, according to George Bisharat, with men from the lower middle class many of whom had reputations for laziness and criminal pursuits, who were harshly criticized as quislings collaborating with Israel, which furnished them with militias and Uzi machine guns that they purportedly used to intimidate civilians.

In the Accord, Palestinian authorities were given a limited zone of autonomy in a restricted number of areas. Various analysts have argued that the agreement saw Israel outmaneuvering the local Palestinian delegation, which had led the Intifada, by getting the PLO representatives abroad to relinquish demands the West Bank and Gaza opposition insisted on – an end to settlements and the formation of a Palestinian state – and thereby securing their own return. They were thus allowed to assume political and economic authority within the territories which they had never managed to achieve alone. (Note: "two contemporaneous negotiations began to take place. On the one side, in 1992-1993, the Israeli government talked to the 'winner' of the confrontation, that is to say the Palestinians from the OPT, through bilateral meetings held in the US. On the other side, in 1993, Israel decided to negotiate with the PLO, without the Palestinians from the OPT even being informed. Finally, it was far away from the OPT and was at risk of losing its control of the Palestinian population living under the Israeli occupation. Obviously, the PLO was a weaker and softer negotiator compared with the Palestinians from the OPT. With the Oslo Agreements, the PLO relinquished at least two fundamental demands: the Israeli recognition of the existence of a Palestinian state and the interruption of construction of new Israeli settlements in the OPT. In exchange for these renunciations the PLO leadership was allowed to go back to the OPT and establish the Palestinian Authority (PA), and it was given a relevant economic and political power that it would never have been able to achieve otherwise.") Thus the Palestinian Authority itself is often viewed as a Quisling regime, or Israel's proxy, since Israel remains in total control of all three zones. Peter Beinart calls it Israel's "subcontractor". (Note: "the PA is not a government; it is a government's subcontractor.") For Edward Said, Meron Benvenisti and Norman Finkelstein, the agreement merely delegated to the PLO a role as "Israel's enforcer", continuing the occupation by "remote control", lending a form of legitimacy to Israel's claims to possess "rights" in what then became in its view "disputed territories", despite the international consensus Israel was under an obligation to withdraw from all of the land it held as occupying power. In Finkelstein's reading, it ratified an extreme version of the Allon Plan. (Note: 'the "Authority" exists essentially to serve Israel's occupation and to help maintain it'.) Others speak of Israel outsourcing the occupation.

The Palestinian Authority also underwrote an agreement which absolved Israel of liability for recompense for all omissions to, or violations of, its obligations as an occupying power committed during the previous three decades of Israeli military rule. Indeed, were Israel convicted of any crime for that period, the burden of Israel paying reparations would fall on the Palestinian authorities who would be obligated to reimburse Israel. The Accords further weakened the Palestinian cause, it has been argued, because it undermined the strength of the Palestinian position by transforming negotiations into endless bargaining between unequal parties. (Note: "Why did this negotiation not lead to a sustainable peace? According to the model we have analysed in the first part of the article, confrontation should have allowed the weaker party in a conflict (i.e., the Palestinians) to strengthen itself so as to force the stronger party (i.e., the Israelis) to begin negotiating. However, the negotiation phase represented an interruption in this process of growing power balance. The Israelis succeeded in transforming the negotiations — later the Oslo Agreements — into a never-ending process of bargaining, while the Palestinians failed to create the embryo of a functioning and democratic state. The power balance started to drop off again (last downward arrow), and this led to a new confrontation in September 2000.")

In an analysis by the Israeli think tank Molad in 2017, it is noted that Israel deploys from 50% to 75% of its active IDF forces in the West Bank. The deployment consists of seven regional brigades, assisted by auxiliary combat battalions, together with Israel's Border Police, the IAF and various special units. Their function is not to counter what Israel defines as terrorism – only 20% perform that task – but to defend settlements, which require 80% of those reserves to undertake guard duty. In Hebron alone some 2,000 soldiers, an entire infantry division, together with 3 border police companies, serve in rotation to protect the settlement of from 500 to 800 Israelis established in that city. Molad's conclusion is that defending settlements has a negative impact on Israel's security. (Note: "Israel's top defense experts agree that while the settlements may have helped national security in the past, this is no longer the case. Having Israeli civilians living throughout the West Bank does not help defend the country; instead, it encumbers the security forces, is a drain on the national defense budget, and complicates the military's work by lengthening the lines of defense. Instead of concentrating on fighting terrorism against Israel, security forces have to divert considerable resources to protecting citizens who have chosen to live in the heart of Palestinian territory.")

== See also ==
- Coordinator of Government Activities in the Territories (COGAT)

== Bibliography ==
- Beinart, Peter (12 February 2014). "George Orwell and Israel's 'Democratic' Occupation of the West Bank". Haaretz.
- Bisharat, George Emile (2012). Palestinian Lawyers and Israeli Rule: Law and Disorder in the West Bank. University of Texas Press. ISBN 978-0-292-73984-0.
- Eldar, Akiva; Zertal, Idith (2007). The Lords of the Land: The Settlers and the State of Israel 1967-2004. Hachette UK. ISBN 978-0-786-74485-5.
- "A2. European Union, Internal Report on "Area C and Palestinian State Building," Brussels, January 2012 (excerpts)". Journal of Palestine Studies. 41 (3): 220–223. Spring 2012. doi:10.1525/jps.2012.xli.3.220. JSTOR 10.1525/jps.2012.xli.3.220.
- Finkelstein, Norman (2003). Image and Reality of the Israel-Palestine Conflict. Verso Books. ISBN 978-1-85984-442-7.
- Francis, Sahar (Summer 2014). "Status of Palestinian Prisoners in International Humanitarian Law". Journal of Palestine Studies. 43 (4): 39–48. doi:10.1525/jps.2014.43.4.39. ISBN 978-1-466-80054-0. JSTOR 10.1525/jps.2014.43.4.39.
- Gallo, Giorgio; Marzano, Arturo (2009). "The Dynamics of Asymmetric Conflicts: The Israeli-Palestinian Case". The Journal of Conflict Studies. 29: 1–18.
- Gazit, Shlomo (2003). Trapped Fools: Thirty Years of Israeli Policy in the Territories. Frank Cass Publisher. ISBN 978-0-714-65489-8.
- Goldstein, Michael (Winter 1978). "Israeli Security Measures in the Occupied Territories: Administrative Detention". Middle East Journal. 32 (1): 35–44. JSTOR 4325711.
- Gordis, Avishay Ben-Sasson; Levi, Yonatan (12 December 2017). Israel's National Security and West Bank Settlements (PDF). Molad.
- Handel, Ariel (2010). "Exclusionary surveillance and spatial uncertainty in the occupied Palestinian territories". In Zureik, Elia; Lyon, David; Abu-Laban, Yasmeen (eds.). Surveillance and Control in Israel/Palestine: Population, Territory and Power. Routledge. pp. 259–274. ISBN 978-1-136-93097-3.
- Kamrava, Mehran (2016). The Impossibility of Palestine: History, Geography, and the Road Ahead. Yale University Press. ISBN 978-0-300-22085-8.
- Khalidi, Rashid (2013). Brokers of Deceit: How the U.S. Has Undermined Peace in the Middle East. Beacon Press. ISBN 978-0-807-04476-6.
- Kimmerling, Baruch (2003). Politicide: Ariel Sharon's War Against the Palestinians. Verso Books. p. 16. ISBN 978-1-859-84517-2.
- Parsons, Nigel (2005). The Politics of the Palestinian Authority: From Oslo to Al-Aqsa. Routledge. ISBN 978-1-135-94523-7.
- Peri, Yoram (2006). Generals in the Cabinet Room: How the Military Shapes Israeli Policy. United States Institute of Peace Press. ISBN 978-1-929-22381-7.
- Pieterse, Jan (1984). "State Terrorism on a Global Scale: The Role of Israel". Crime and Social Justice. 21–22 (4): 58–80. JSTOR 29766230.
- Playfair, Emma (Fall 1988). "Israel's Security Needs in the West Bank, Real and Contrived". Arab Studies Quarterly. 10 (4): 406–423. JSTOR 41857980.
- Selby, Jan (2003a). "Dressing up Domination as 'Cooperation': The Case of Israeli-Palestinian Water Relations" (PDF). Review of International Studies. 29 (1): 121–138. doi:10.1017/S026021050300007X. JSTOR 20097837. S2CID 146759349.
- Stockton, Ronald R. (Summer 1990). "Intifada Deaths". Journal of Palestine Studies. 19 (4): 86–95. doi:10.2307/2537390. JSTOR 2537390.
- Swirski, Shlomo (2010). The Burden of the Israeli–Palestinian Conflict: 2010 Report (PDF). Adva Center.
