= Geoffrey Aronson =

American historian

Geoffrey Aronson is a writer and analyst, specializing in Middle East affairs. He was the director for Foundation for Middle East Peace and the editor of the bimonthly Report on Israeli Settlement in the Occupied Palestinian Territories until June 2014. His articles on a wide range of contemporary policy and strategic issues appear regularly.

== Books ==
He is the author of the following two books:

- From Sideshow to Center Stage: US Policy towards Egypt and Israel
- Palestinians, and the Occupied Territories: Creating Facts in the West Bank.
