= Taher (name) =

Taher طاهر
- Pronunciation: [tˤɑːˈher] [tˤɑːˈhɪr]
- Gender: Male

Origin
- Origin: Semitic (Arabic)
- Meaning: Pure, virtuous
- Region of origin: Arabia (Middle East)

Other names
- Alternative spelling: Tahir; Tahar
- Variant form: Tahira (female)

Taher, Tahir, Tahiru, Tahiry, Taahir, or Tahirou (Arabic: طاهر) is a masculine given name and surname of Arabic origin meaning "pure" or "virtuous". It is traditionally a given name in Muslim and Jewish communities originating from the Middle East and Africa. Notable people with the name include:

== Given name ==
=== Taahir ===
- Taahir Goedeman (born 1999), South African footballer

=== Taher ===
- Taher Abouzeid (born 1962), Egyptian politician
- Taher Ahmadzadeh (1921–2017), Iranian political activist
- Taher Tawfiq al-Ani (born 1941), Iraqi politician
- Taher al-Aqili (born 1970), Yemeni military officer and politician
- Taher Ali Baig, Indian playwright
- Taher Benkhelifa (born 1994), Algerian footballer
- Taher Elgamal (born 1955), Egyptian cryptographer
- Taher Fakhruddin (born 1968), Indian Islamic leader
- Taher Helmy, Egyptian lawyer
- Taher Shekh Al Hokamaii (born 1954), Iranian sculptor
- Taher Kaboutari (born 1985), Iranian rower
- Taher Masri (born 1942), Jordanian politician
- Taher Mohamed (born 1997), Egyptian footballer
- Taher Sabahi (born 1940), Iranian art dealer, journalist, author
- Taher Saifuddin (1888–1965), Indian Islamic religious leader
- Taher Shabbir, Indian actor
- Taher Shah, Pakistani singer-songwriter, music producer, internet personality, and businessman
- Taher Shriteh, Palestinian-American businessman and journalist
- Taher Zakaria (born 1988), Qatari footballer

=== Tahir ===
- Tahir (Indonesian businessman) (born 1952), Indonesian businessman
- Tahir ibn Abdallah (died 862), Tahirid governor of Khurasan
- Tahir Afridi (1939–2021), Pakistani fiction writer
- Tahir Akyurek (born 1959), Turkish politician
- Tahir Albakaa (born 1950), Iraqi historian
- Tahir Ali (born 1971), British politician
- Tahir Aliyev, Azerbaijani politician
- Tahir Amin (1952–2019), Pakistani political scientist
- Tahir ibn Muhammad ibn Amr (883–??), Saffarid Emir
- Tahir R. Andrabi, Pakistani-American economist
- Tahir Mehmood Ashrafi, Pakistani Islamic scholar
- Tahir Aydoğdu (born 1959), Turkish virtuoso qanun player
- Taher Badakhshi (1933–1979), Afghan cultural and political personality
- Tahir Batatina (born 1977), Kosovar football manager and military officer
- Tahir Pasha Mahmud Bey-zade, Ottoman governor
- Tahir Raj Bhasin (born 1987), Indian actor
- Tahir Ali Bhat (born 1964/65), Nepalese politician
- Tahir Pasha Bibezić (1848–1913), Ottoman general
- Tahir Bilgiç (born 1968), Australian-Turkish comedian
- Tahir Bisić (born 1981), Bosnian alpine skier
- Tahir Bizenjo, Pakistani politician
- Tahir Rafique Butt (born 1955), Pakistani Air Force officer
- Tahir Mahmood Chahal (born 1984), Pakistani politician
- Tahir Chaudhry (1965–2018), Pakistani chef and culinary expert
- Tahir Iqbal Chaudhry (born 1969), Pakistani politician
- Tahir Bashir Cheema (born 1960), Pakistani politician
- Tahir Dar (born 1975), Pakistani-Bahraini cricketer
- Tahir Dawar (1968–2018), Pakistani police officer and poet
- Tahir Demi (1919–1961), Albanian politician
- Tahir Dizdari (1900–1972), Albanian orientalist, folklorist, and scholar
- Tahir Elçi (1966–2015), Turkish lawyer
- Tahir Emra (1938–2024), Albanian painter
- Tahir Hussain Gayavi (1947–2023), Indian Islamic scholar and educator
- Tahir Allauddin Al-Qadri Al-Gillani (1932–1991), Iraqi Sufi saint
- Tahir Efendi Gjakova (1770–??), Albanian religious leader
- Tahir Aslam Gora (born 1963), Pakistani-Canadian author and activist
- Tahir Gözel (born 1972), Azerbaijani businessman
- Tahir Güleç (born 1993), German-Turkish taekwondo athlete
- Tahir Jalil Habbush (1950–2026), Iraqi intelligence official
- Tahir Hanfi (born 1955), Pakistani poet, journalist, and civil servant
- Tahir Hanley (born 1997), Saint Kitts and Nevis footballer
- Tahir Hasanov (1970–1992), Azerbaijani war hero
- Tahir Hemphill (born 1972), American multimedia artist
- Tahir ibn Husayn (died 822), Abbasid general and governor of Khorasan
- Tahir Hussain (1938–2010), Indian film producer, screenwriter, actor, and film director
- Tahir Hussain (physicist) (1923–2010), Pakistani nuclear physicist
- Tahir Hussain (politician) (born 1969), Indian politician
- Tahir Iqbal (born 1951), Pakistani politician and army officer
- Tahir Hamut Izgil (born 1969), Chinese poet, filmmaker, and author
- Tahir bin Jalaluddin (1869–1956), Indonesian-Malaysian Islamic scholar
- Tahir al-Jazairi (1852–1920), Syrian Islamic scholar and educational reformer
- Tahir Kamran, Pakistani historian
- Tahir Karapınar (born 1967), Turkish football coach and player
- Tahir Khan (Afghan cricketer) (born 1997), Afghan cricketer
- Tahir Khan (Pakistani cricketer) (born 1981), Pakistani cricketer
- Tahir Mahmood Khan (1956–2025), Pakistani politician
- Tahir Kolgjini (1903–1988), Albanian imam
- Tahir Mahmood (born 1941), Indian legal scholar and author
- Tahir Mahmood (cricketer) (born 1962), Pakistani cricketer
- Tahir Mamman (born 1954), Nigerian lawyer, professor, and academic
- Tahir Maqsood (born 1981), Pakistani cricketer
- Tahir Hussain Mashhadi (1942–2022), Pakistani politician
- Tahir Meha (1943–1981), Albanian political activist
- Tahir Mirkishili (born 1977), Azerbaijani economist and politician
- Tahir Mirza (1936–2007), Pakistani journalist
- Tahir Mohsan (born 1971), British-Pakistani businessman
- Tahir Mughal (1977–2021), Pakistani cricketer
- Tahir Muhedini, Albanian politician
- Tahir ibn Muslim (died 992), Husaynid emir of Medina
- Tahir Khan Nahar, Pakistani chief
- Tahir Naqqash (born 1959), Pakistani cricketer
- Tahir Naqvi (born 1942), Pakistani writer
- Tahir Hamid Nguilin, Chadian politician
- Tahir Nikšić (1950–2026), Bosnian actor and theatre artist
- Tahir Pasha (Egypt), Ottoman Pasha
- Tahir Pervez (born 1963), Pakistani footballer
- Tahir-ul-Qadri (born 1951), Pakistani Islamic scholar
- Tahir Qureshi (1946–2020), Pakistani environmentalist
- Tahir Rasheed (cricketer) (born 1960), Pakistani cricketer
- Tahir Rzayev (born 1950), Azerbaijani politician
- Tahir Sadiq (born 1950), Pakistani politician
- Tahir Salahov (1928–2021), Azerbaijani painter and draughtsman
- Tahir Shah (born 1966), British author, journalist, and documentary maker
- Tahir Shah (cricketer) (1959–2025), Pakistani cricketer
- Tahir Shamsi (1962–2021), Pakistani medical researcher
- Tahir Hussain Siddique, Indian politician
- Tahir Sinani (1964–2001), Kosovar activist
- Tahir Tahirov (1948–2019), Azerbaijani painter
- Tahir Muhammad Thattvi, Mughal poet and historian
- Tahir Walsh (born 1994), Antiguan sprinter
- Tahir Whitehead (born 1990), American football player
- Tahir Yahya (1916–1986), Iraqi politician
- Tahir Zahidov (born 1979), Azerbaijani wrestler
- Tahir Zamakhshari (1914–1987), Saudi poet and writer
- Tahir Zaman (born 1969), Pakistani hockey player
- Tahir Zemaj (1951–2003), Kosovar military leader

=== Tahirou ===
- Tahirou Amadou, Nigerien politician
- Tahirou Congacou (1911–1993), Beninese politician

=== Tahiru ===
- Tahiru Awudu (born 2000), Ghanaian footballer

=== Tahiry ===
- Tahiry Mosa, Malagasy politician

== Surname ==
=== Taher ===
- Abu Taher (1932–2004) Bangladeshi industrialist and politician
- Ali Jawad Al Taher (died 1996), Iraqi critic and literary scholar
- Ayman Taher (born 1966), Egyptian football player
- Bahaa Taher (1935–2022), Egyptian novelist
- Moeslim Taher (1934–1999), Indonesian education figure who founded Jayabaya University
- Nahed Taher, Saudi businesswoman
- Tareq Mubarak Taher (born 1986), Kenyan-Bahraini long-distance runner
- Tarmizi Taher (1936–2013), Indonesian politician and minister
- Yaqoub Al Taher (born 1983), Kuwaiti footballer
- Yaseinn Taher, Yemeni-American terror suspect
- Ymär Daher (1910–1999), Finnish Tatar cultural figure

=== Tahir ===
- Abdullah Tahir, Ethiopian-Yemeni politician
- Faran Tahir (born 1963), Pakistani-American film and television actor
- Imran Tahir (born 1979), South African cricketer
- Kemal Tahir (1910–1973), Turkish novelist and intellectual
- Malika Tahir (born 1976), French figure skater
- Mehmet Tahir (1864–1909), Ottoman-era publisher
- Naqaash Tahir (born 1983), English cricketer
- Sabaa Tahir, Pakistani-American author

== See also ==
- Tahira
- Tahar
- Islamic hygienical jurisprudence
- Tair (disambiguation)
