= Beer in Armenia =

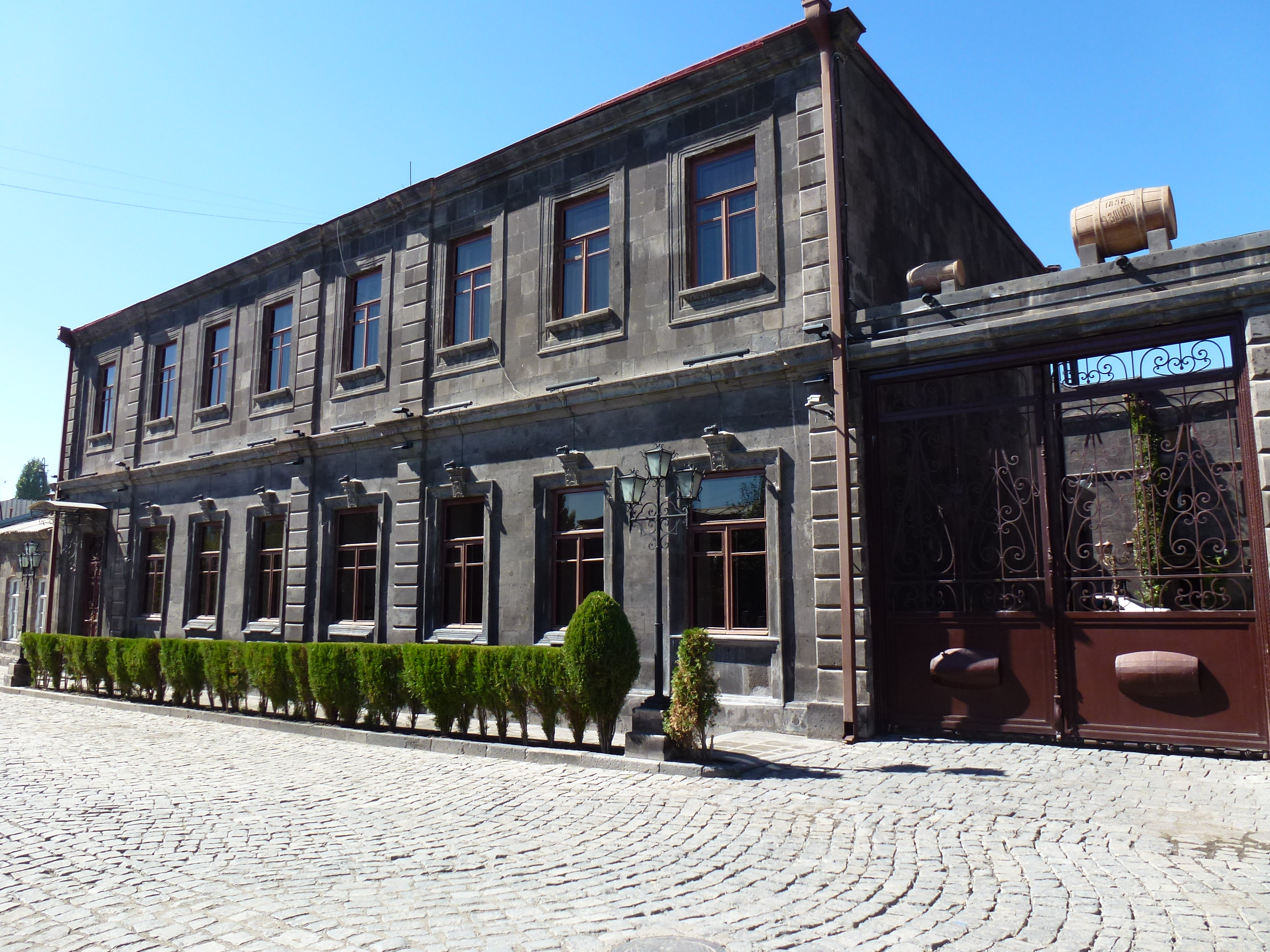
The old brewery building in Gyumri

Beer has been produced in Armenia since ancient history. In the 5th century BCE, after arriving at a village in Ancient Armenia, Xenophon wrote in the Anabasis that "There were stored wheat, barley, vegetables, and barley wine in the craters (clay pots). In upper level of vessels with the edges in the wine floated barley, and there was stuck a reed, large and small sizes and who wanted to drink, had to take a reed in his mouth and pull it through the wine. Not mixed with water, the wine was very strong, but for local people it was a very pleasant drink".

== Beer festival ==
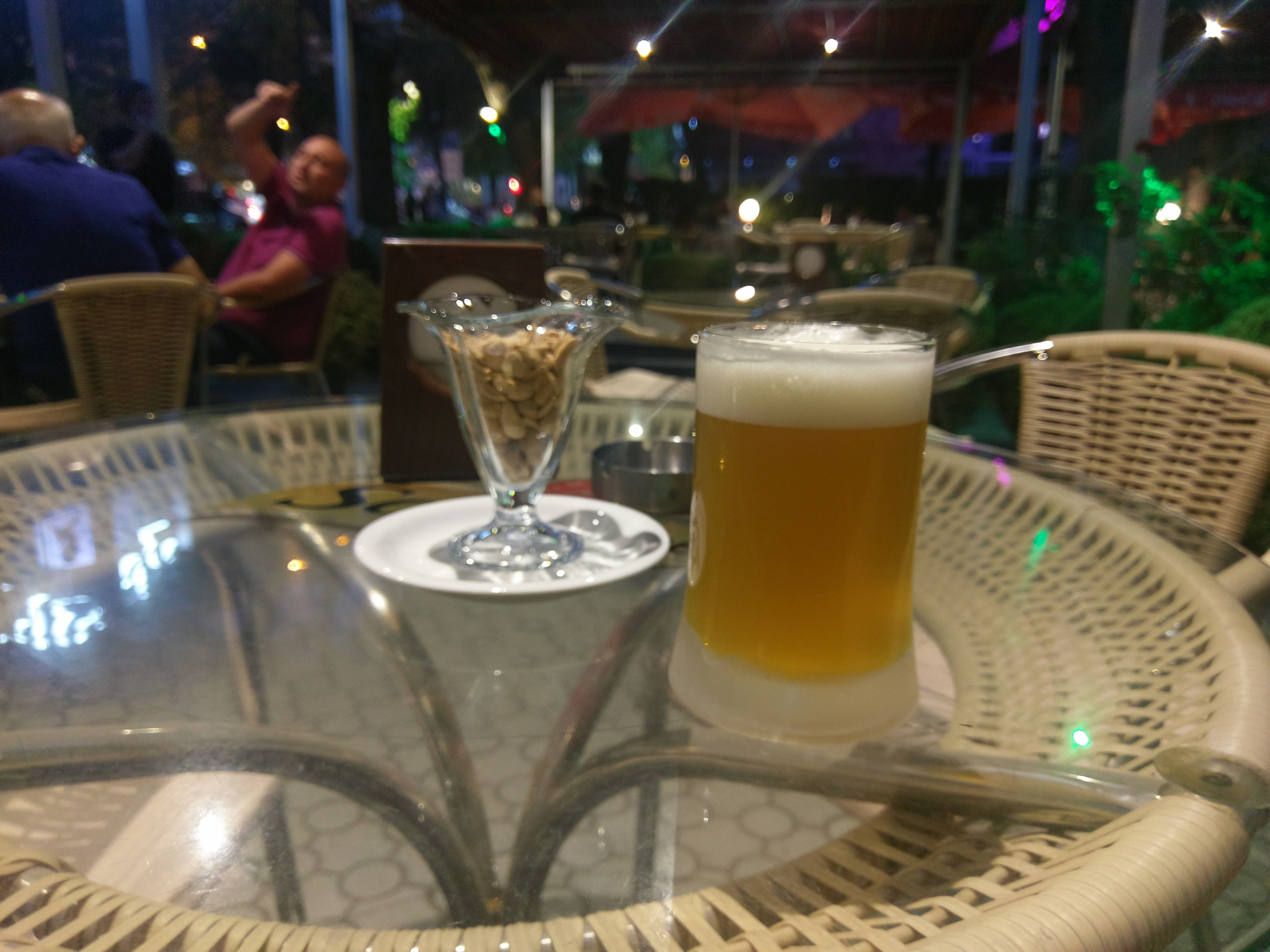
A beer garden in Yerevan

The Yerevan Beer Fest is held annually during August. It was first organized in 2014. The Swan lake situated in the park near the Yerevan Opera Theatre is the regular home of the festival. More than 10,000 visitors attended the 5th edition of the Yerevan Beer Fest in August 2018, which featured all the breweries and microbreweries in Armenia.

== Breweries ==
The first brewery in modern history of Armenia was opened in 1892 in Yerevan. Known as Zanga Brewery, the plant was located in the Hrazdan River gorge. The brewery's products were branded as Bok-Beer. However, the plant was closed during the 1920s.

As of 2023, the following seven brewing companies are operating in Armenia:

- Beer of Yerevan Brewery: operating since 1952 in Yerevan, and currently producing beer under the brands Kilikia (flagship brand), Yerevan, Hayer, Městské Pivo and 12.06.
- Dargett Craft Beer: operating since 2016 in Yerevan, and currently serving Dargett craft beer.
- Dilijan Brewery: operating since 2016 in Dilijan, Tavush Province, and currently producing beer under the brand Dilijan.
- Gyumri Beer Brewery: operating since 1970 in Gyumri, Shirak Province, and currently producing beer under the brands Gyumri (flagship brand), Ararat and Aleksandrapol.
- Hayasy Group: operating since 2007 in Voskevaz village, Aragatsotn Province, and currently producing beer under the brand Hayasy.
- Kotayk Brewery: operating since 1974 in Abovyan, Kotayk Province, and currently producing beer under the brands Kotayk (flagship brand), Erebuni and Urartu.
- Lihnitis Sevan Brewery: operating since 2007 in Sevan, Gegharkunik Province, and currently producing beer under the brand Kellers.

=== Microbreweries/Brewpubs ===
As of 2023, there are nine microbreweries/brewpubs that produce and serve draught/unfiltered beer in Armenia:

- 379 Brewing Company: Abovyan-based brewery operating since 2022.
- Alaverdi Draft Beer: operating since 1947 in Alaverdi, Lori Province, and currently serving Alaverdi unfiltered beer.
- AM Group: operating since 1998 in Tairov village, Armavir Province, and currently serving Jäger unfiltered beer and Roskvas kvass.
- Art Beer 1680: operating since 2017 in Kakavadzor village of Aragatsotn Province, and currently serving Art beer (light and dark).
- Blonder Beer House and Brewery: operating since 2000 in Yerevan, and currently serving Blonder Slovak pilsner unfiltered beer.
- Beer Academy Yerevan: operating since 2012 in Yerevan, and currently serving Academia unfiltered beer.
- Dors Brewpub: Yerevan-based brewpub.
- Tovmas Craft Beer: operating since 2016 in Yerevan, and currently serving Tovmas unfiltered beer.
- Vladimir Hakobyan Microbrewery: operating since 2017 in Dovegh village, Tavush Province, and currently serving Dovegh's unfiltered beer.

== Republic of Artsakh ==
The Republic of Artsakh had a single brewery – Central Brewpub in the capital Stepanakert.

== See also ==
- List of breweries in Armenia
- Armenian wine
- Beer and breweries by region
