= List of breweries in Armenia =

This is a list of breweries in Armenia. Beer has been produced in Armenia since ancient times.

== Breweries ==
As of July 2018, the following brewing companies are operating in Armenia:

=== Beer of Yerevan Brewery ===
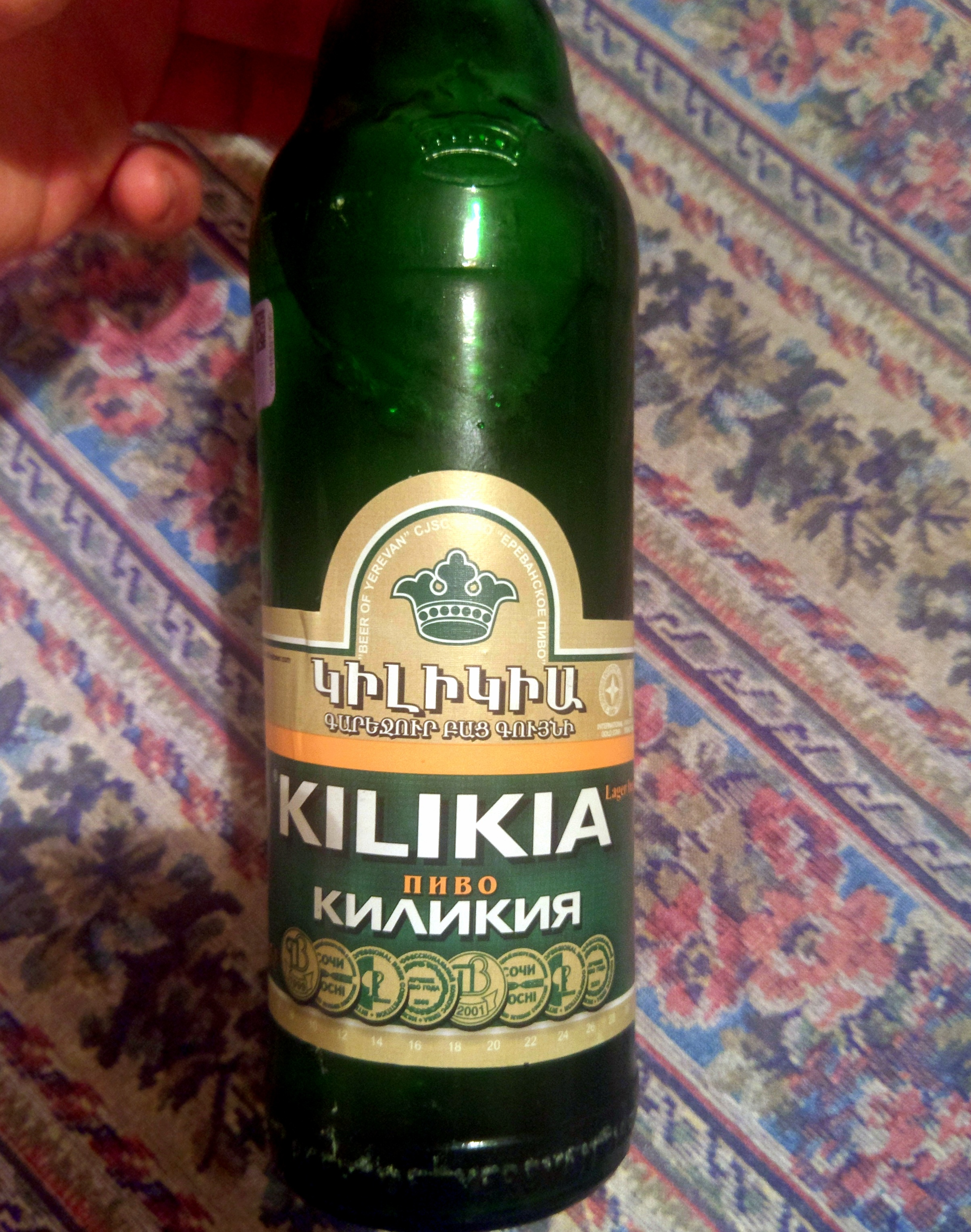
Kilikia pale lager

- Opened in 1952, it is the largest brewery in Armenia. Currently, several types of beer are produced and bottled by the brewery:
  - Kilikia Lager, pale lager, 4.8% ABV
  - Kilikia 1952, pale lager, 4.8% ABV
  - Kilikia 11, pale lager, 4.6% ABV
  - Kilikia Elitar, pale lager, 5.6% ABV
  - Kilikia Jubilee, pale lager, 5.1% ABV
  - Kilikia Light, pale lager, 4.5% ABV
  - Kilikia Youth, pale lager, 4.8% ABV
  - Kilikia Dark, Oktoberfestbier/Märzen, 12% wort extract, 4.4% ABV
  - Kilikia Tonakan/Celebratory, premium lager, 5.3% ABV
  - Yerevan Premium, pale lager, 4.8% ABV
  - Yerevan Zhigulyovskoe, pale lager, 5% ABV
  - Hayer, pilsner, 4.9% ABV
  - 12.06 Premium, pale lager, 4.8% ABV

=== Gyumri Beer Brewery ===
- Gyumri, Ararat and Aleksandrapol from the Gyumri Beer brewery, located in Gyumri. Opened in 1970, it is the second largest brewery in Armenia. However, the old brewery of Gyumri dates back to 1898. Currently, seven types of pale lager beer are produced by the brewery under the Gyumri, Ararat and Aleksandrapol labels:
  - Aleksandrapol, pale lager, 4.5% ABV
  - Ararat, bitter pale lager, 12% wort extract, 4.5% ABV
  - Gyumri Czech, pilsner, 4.5% ABV
  - Gyumri Gold, pale lager, 13% wort extract, 4.7% ABV
  - Gyumri Extra, pale lager, 7% ABV
  - Gyumri Unfiltered Beer, unfiltered pale lager, 4.7% ABV
  - Hndkadzawar, unfiltered pale lager, 4.7% ABV
  - Red Limited, dark lager, 4.1% ABV
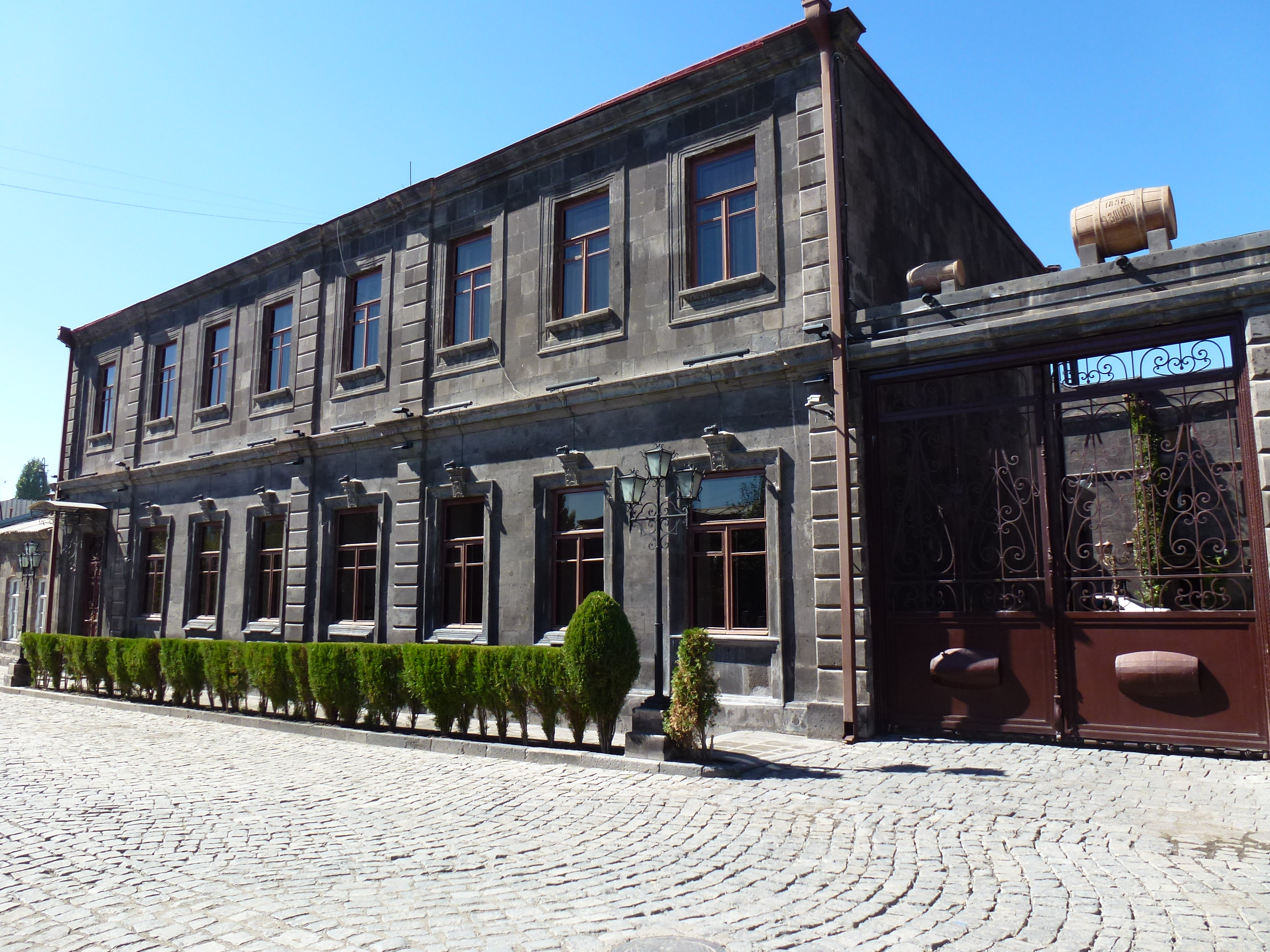
The old brewery in Gyumri opened in 1898

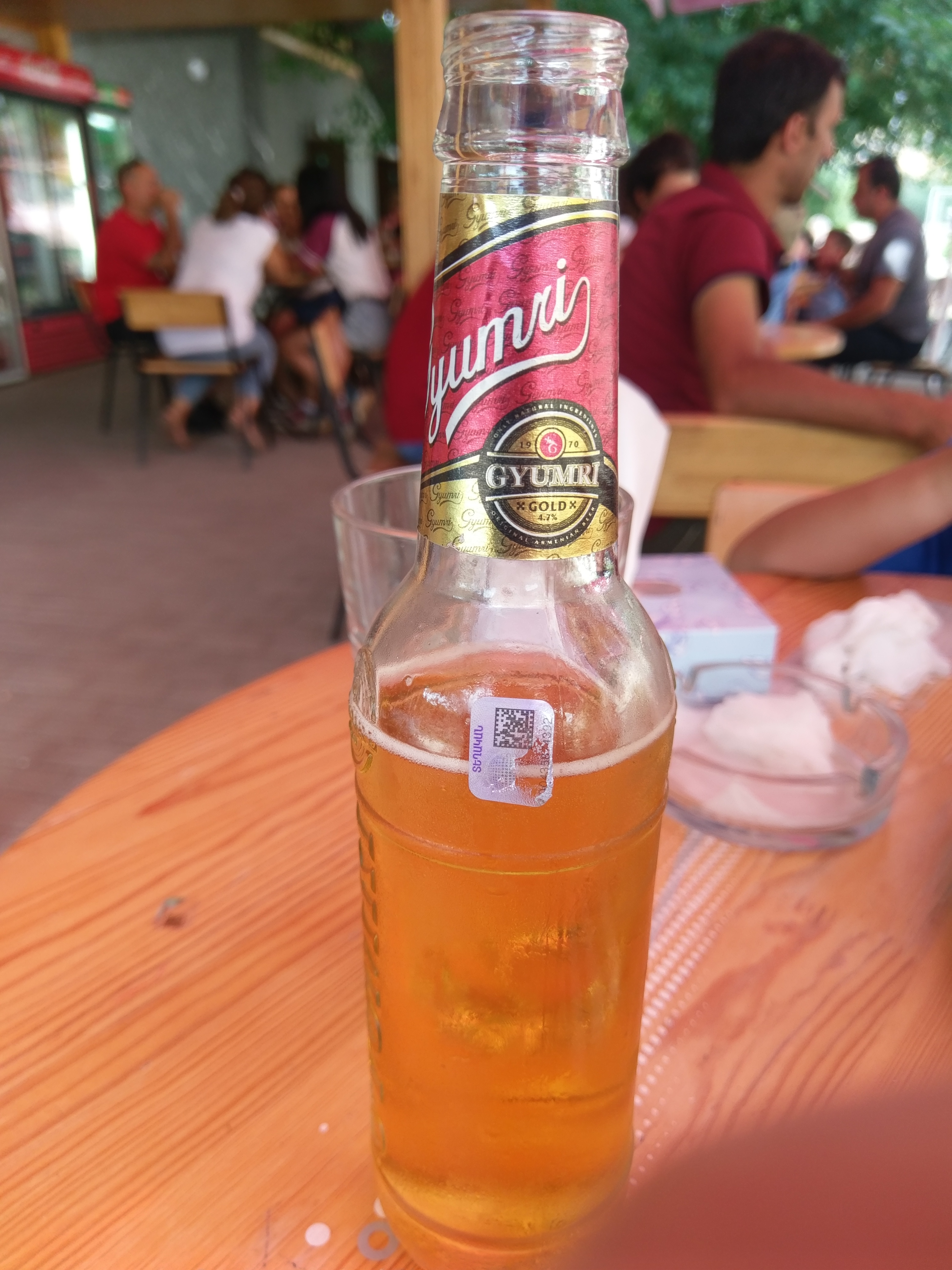
Gyumri Beer

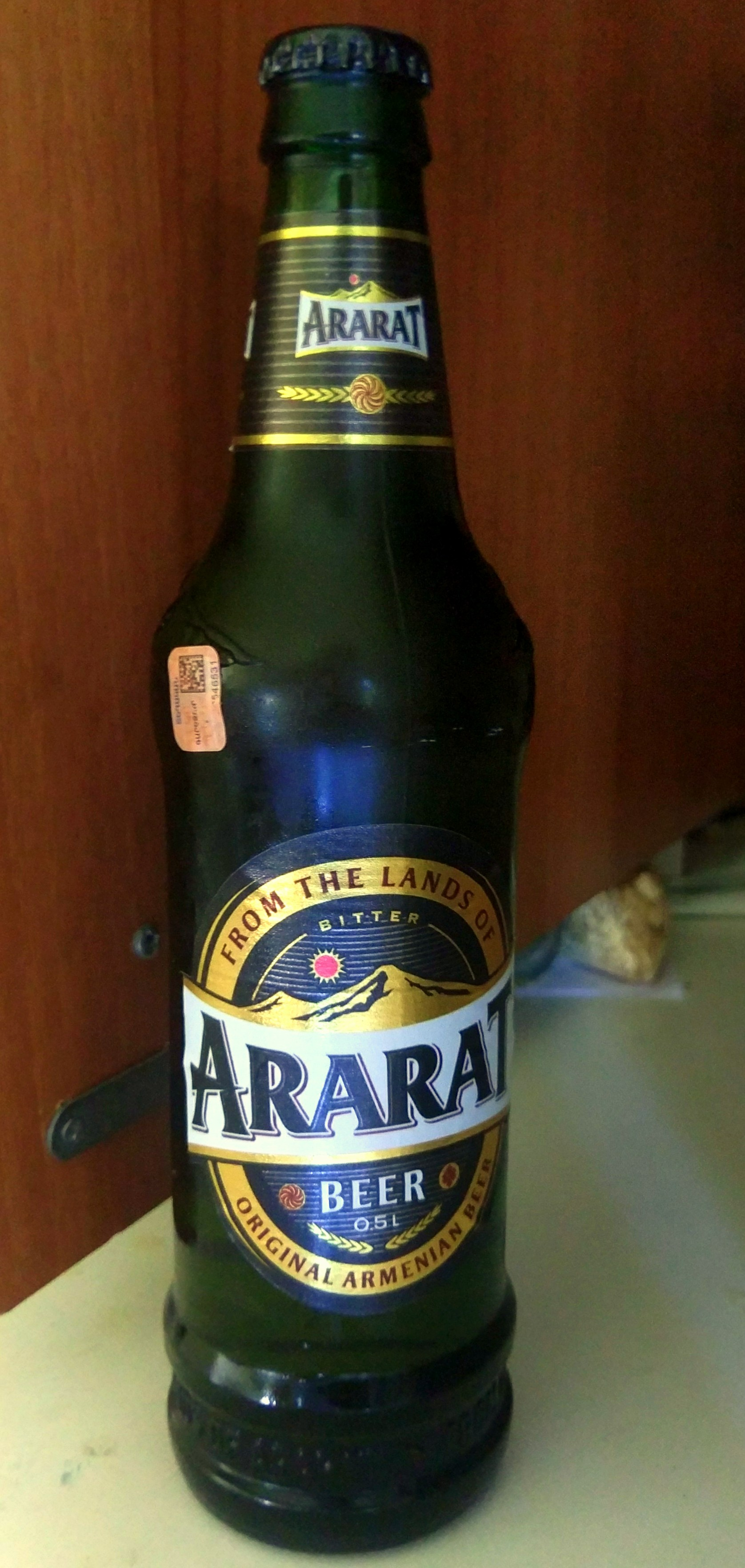
Ararat Beer

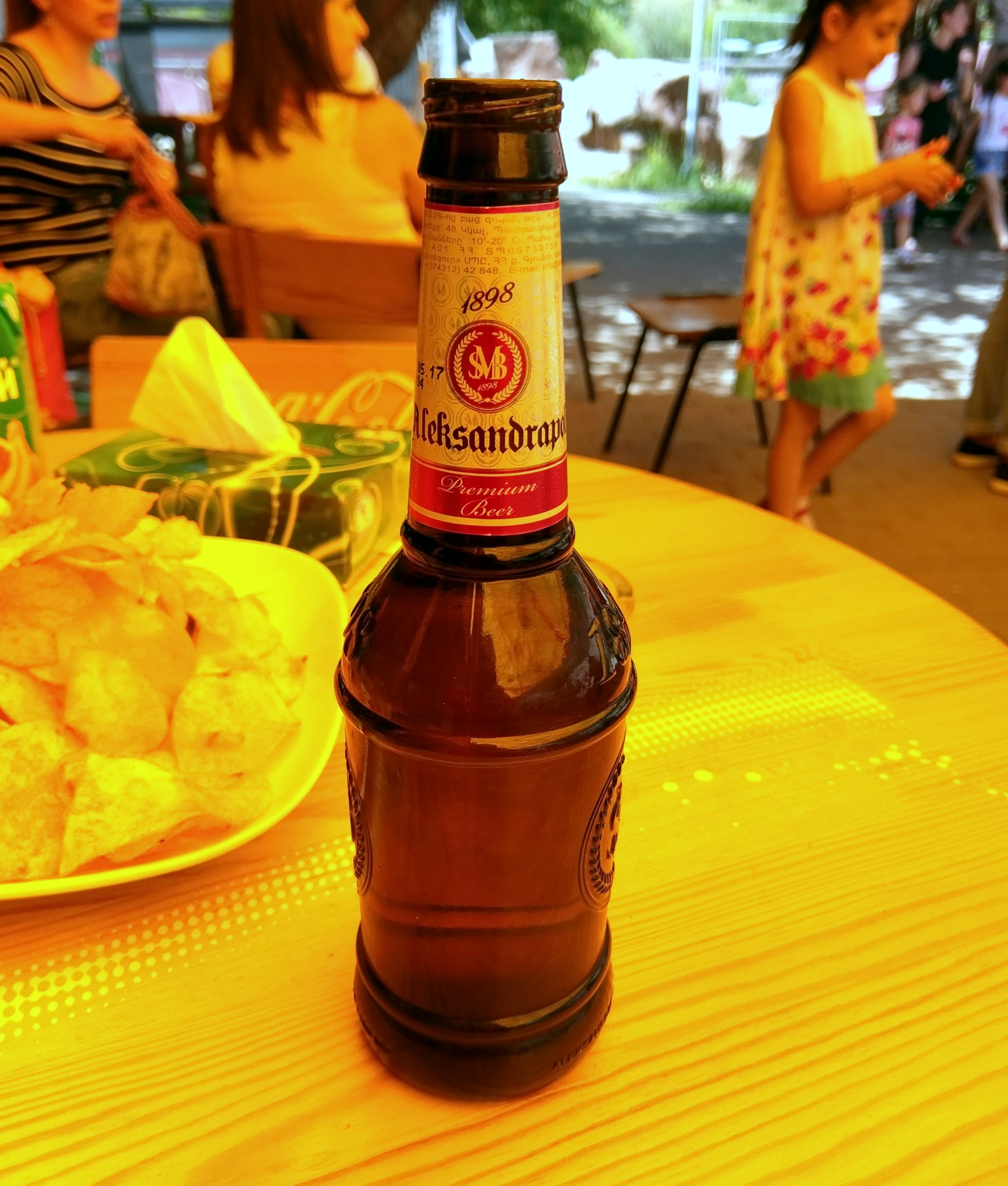
Aleksandrapol Beer

=== Kotayk Brewery ===
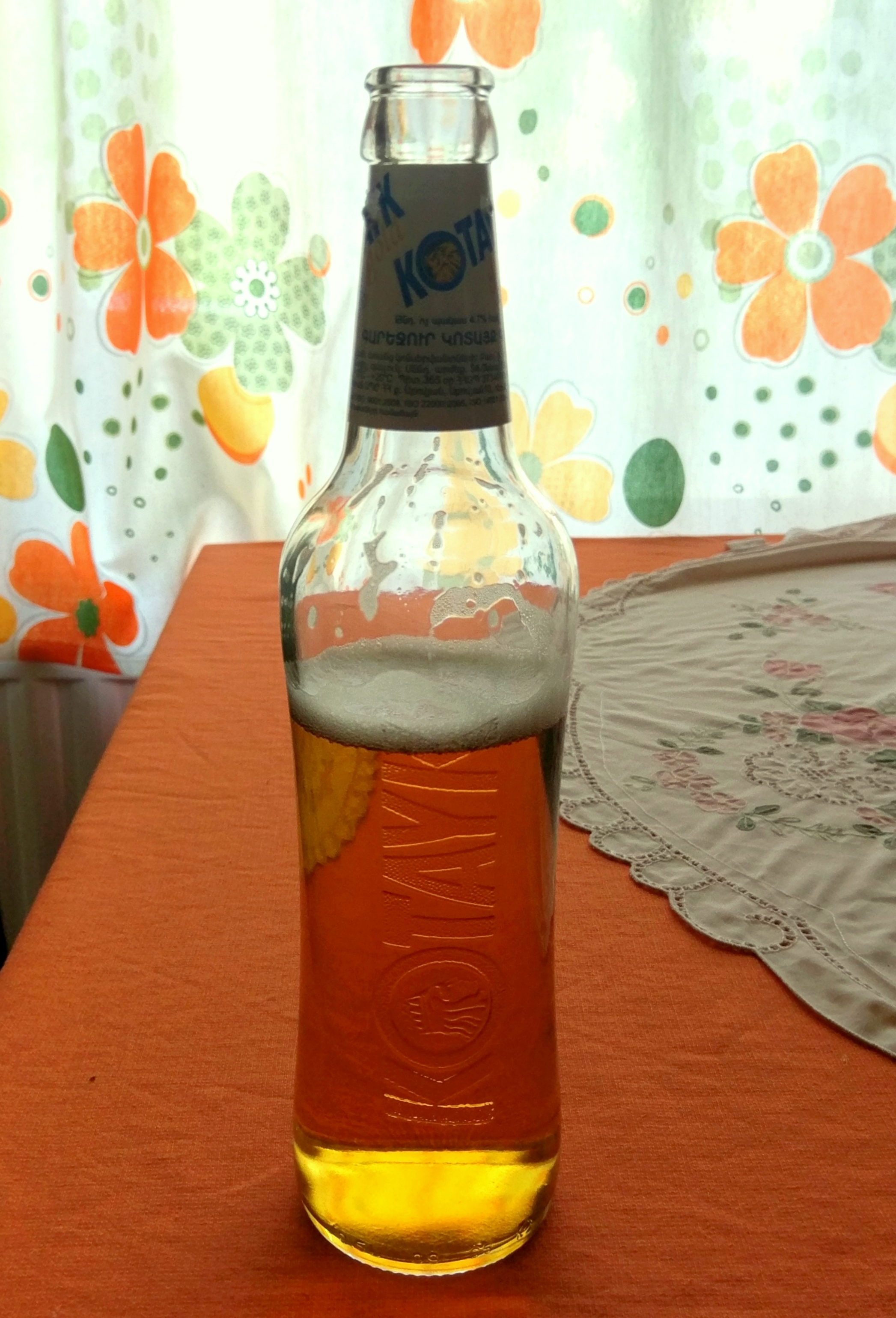
A bottle of Kotayk Gold

- Kotayk, Erebuni and Urartu from the Kotayk Brewery, located in Abovyan. Opened in 1974, it is the third largest brewery in Armenia. Currently, five types of lager beer are produced by the brewery:
  - Kotayk, pale lager, 5.2% ABV
  - Kotayk Gold, pale lager, 5.6% ABV
  - Kotayk Tshani, pale lager, 5.2% ABV
  - Erebuni, strong lager, 6.4% ABV
  - Erebuni 14, pale lager, 4.8% ABV
  - Urartu, pale lager, 4% ABV

=== Lihnitis Sevan Brewery ===
- Kellers from the Lihnitis Sevan Brewery, located in Sevan. Opened in 2007, currently one type of lager beer is produced by the brewery that is sold in bottles:
  - Kellers, pale lager, 11.5% wort extract, 4.4% ABV
- The brewery also produces three types of lager that are only available in the brewery's pub (draught beer):
  - Kellers Gold Draught, unfiltered pale lager, 11.5% wort extract, 4.4% ABV
  - Kellers Gold Filtered, pale lager, unpasteurized, 11.5% wort extract, 4.4% ABV
  - Kellers Dark Draught, dunkel, unfiltered, 13% wort extract, 4.8% ABV
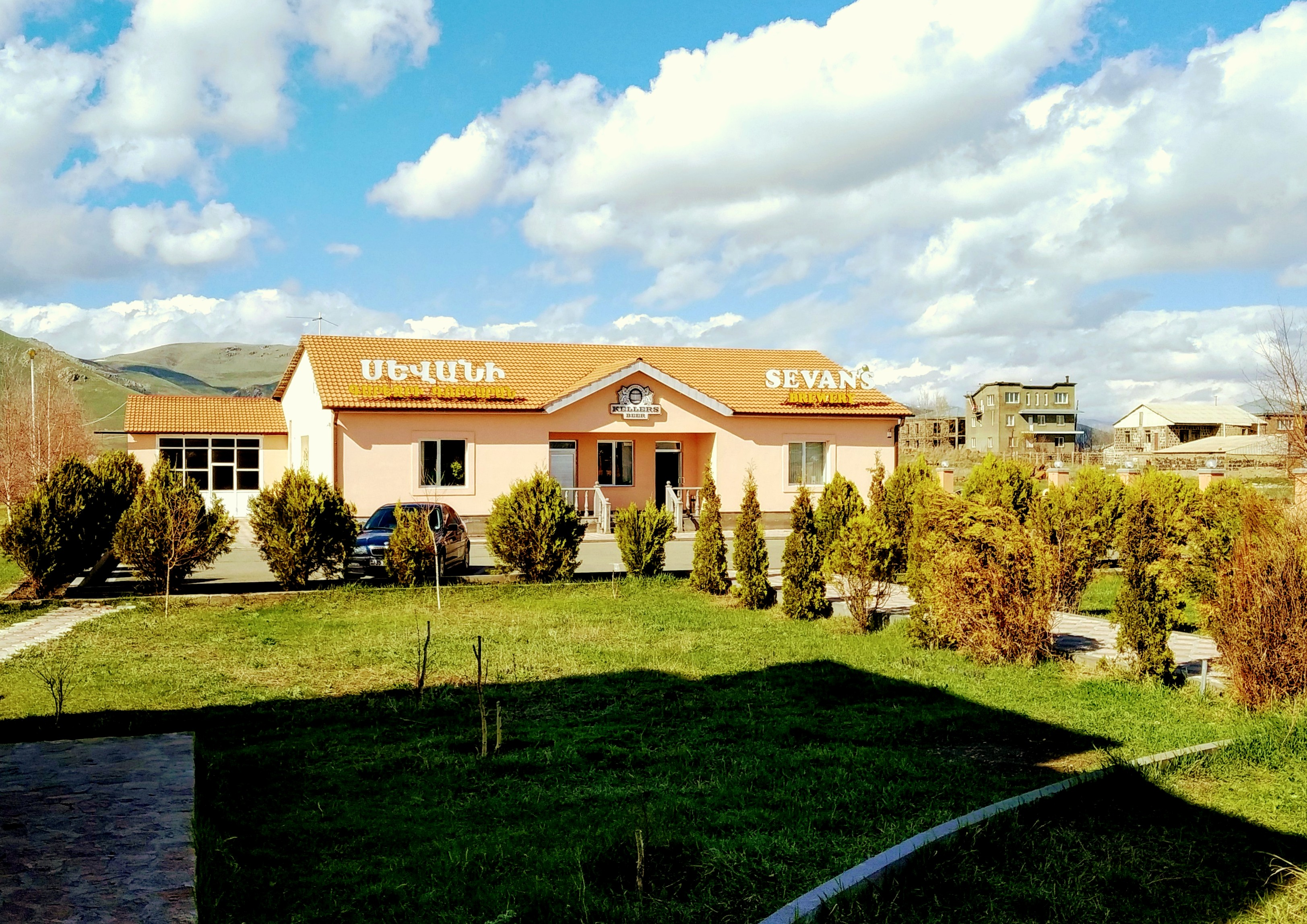
Lihnitis Sevan Brewery

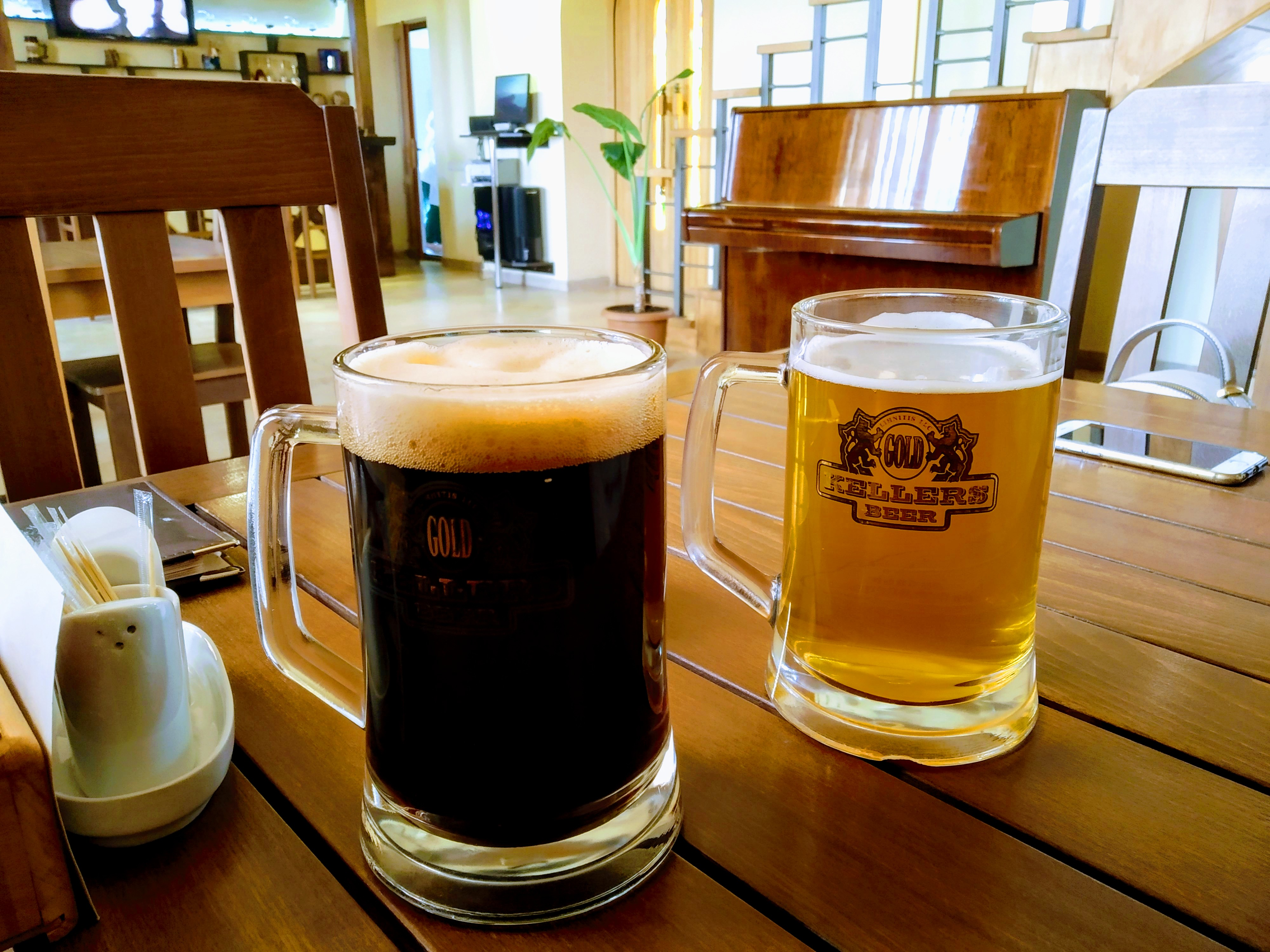
Kellers Dark Draught and Kellers Gold Draught

=== Hayasy Group ===
- Hayasy from the Hayasy Group, located in Voskevaz. Opened in 2011, currently three types of lager beer are produced and bottled by the brewery:
  - Hayasy Classic, premium lager, 4.5% ABV
  - Hayasy Black, black beer
  - Hayasy Exclusive, pale lager, 4.4% ABV

=== Dilijan Brewery ===
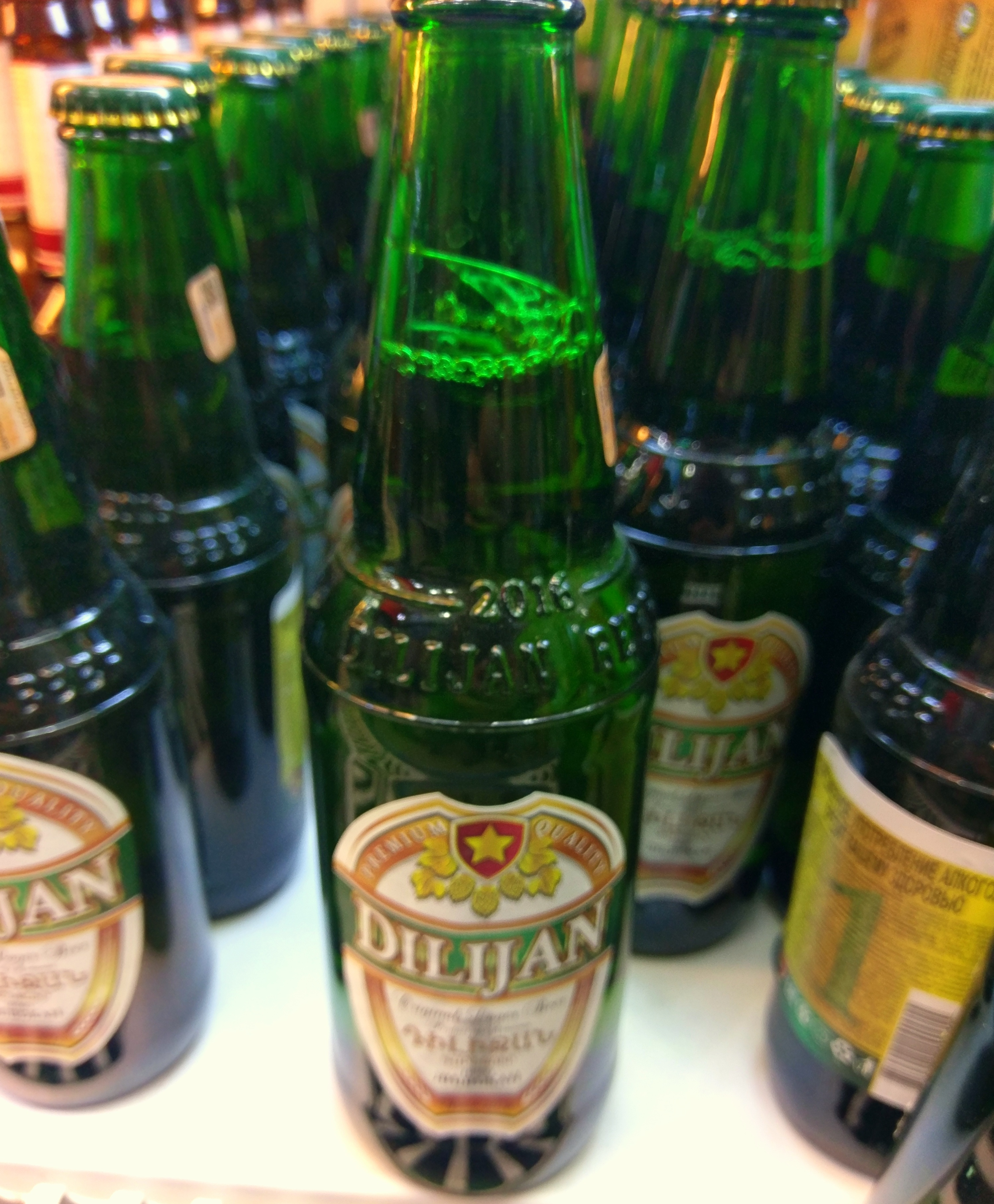
Dilijan Beer

- Dilijan from the Dilijan Brewery, located in Dilijan. Opened in 2016, the brewery currently produces:
  - Dilijan 1, non-alcoholic lager, 0% ABV
  - Dilijan 1, pale lager, 12% wort extract, 4.6% ABV
  - Dilijan 2, pale lager, 12% wort extract, 4.9% ABV
  - Dilijan 3, wheat beer, 12.5% wort extract, 4.4% ABV
  - Dilijan 4, dark lager, 13% wort extract, 5% ABV
  - Dilijan 5, pale lager, 4.7% ABV

=== Dargett Brewery ===
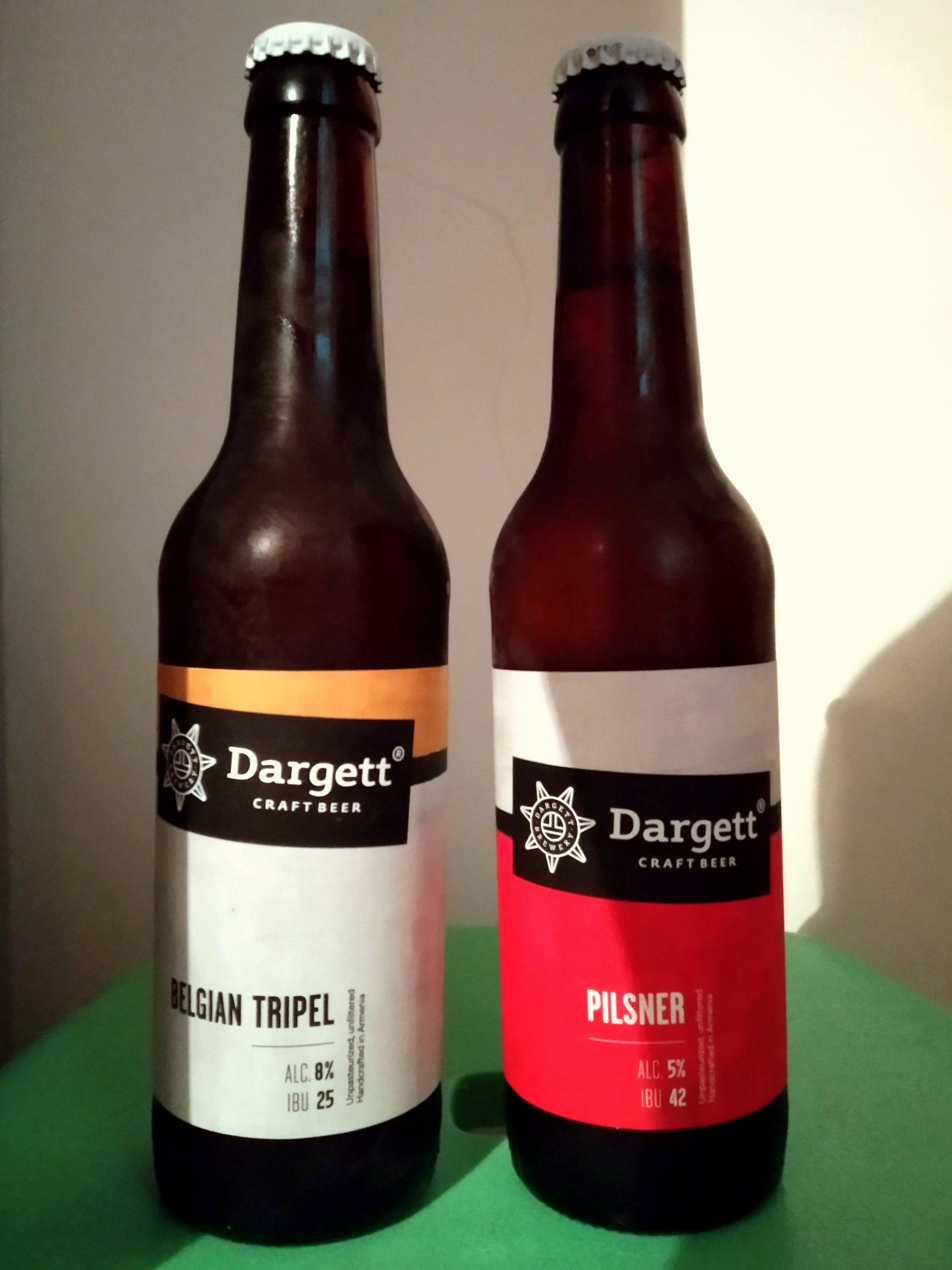
Dargett, Belgian tripel and Bohemian pilsner

- Dargett Beer from the Dargett Brewery near Abovyan. Opened in 2016 in Yerevan as a brewpub, it currently produces and serves a large variety of unfiltered beer made in the brewery opened in 2019:
  - Dargett Steppenwolf, Bavarian weizen, 20 IBU, 5% ABV
  - Dargett La Rapsodia, Bohemian pilsner, 42 IBU, 5% ABV
  - Dargett Belle De Jour, blonde ale, 20 IBU, 5% ABV
  - Dargett What The Hell, Münich light lager, 22 IBU, 5% ABV
  - Dargett Metamorphosis, Vienna lager, 22 IBU, 5.5% ABV
  - Dargett The Catcher In The Wheat, American wheat ale, 25 IBU, 4.6% ABV
  - Dargett Coney Island, American pale ale, 40 IBU, 5.5% ABV
  - Dargett Vertigo, India pale ale, 60 IBU, 7% ABV
  - Dargett Armenia Invicta, Imperial IPA, 95 IBU, 8.5% ABV
  - Dargett Milestones, black IPA, 60 IBU, 7.5% ABV
  - Dargett Uncle Raffi's, apple cider, 5.6% ABV
  - Dargett Morello, cherry ale, 18 IBU, 6% ABV
  - Dargett Prunus Armeniaca, apricot ale, 18 IBU, 6% ABV
  - Dargett Seven Sins, Belgian tripel, 25 IBU, 8% ABV
  - Dargett 1984, nitro oatmeal stout, 30 IBU, 4.8% ABV
  - Dargett Odin, Baltic porter, 30 IBU, 7% ABV
  - Dargett Woland, Russian Imperial stout, 70 IBU, 10% ABV
  - Dargett Underdog, vegetable beer, 6% ABV
  - Dargett Belgian Blanche, witbier, 18 IBU, 4.8% ABV
  - Dargett You Have To Try It, New England IPA, 35 IBU, 6.5% ABV
  - Dargett Dream #9, American red ale, 5% ABV
  - Dargett Pumpkin, pumpkin ale, 20 IBU, 5% ABV.

== Microbreweries/Brewpubs ==
As of 2019, there are six microbreweries/brewpubs that produce and serve draught beer in Armenia:

=== Alaverdi Draft Beer ===
- Alaverdi Beer from the Alaverdi Draft Beer microbrewery in Alaverdi, Lori Province. Opened in 1947, it currently serves many types of unfiltered beer in several pubs throughout Armenia.

=== AM Group ===
- Jäger Beer Armenia and Roskvas from the AM Group microbrewery in Tairov, Armavir Province. Opened in 1998, it currently serves the Jäger Armenia unfiltered beer and Roskvas kvass (Slavic and Baltic fermented beverage) in several pubs throughout Armenia.

=== Blonder Beer House and Brewery ===
- Blonder Beer from the Blonder Beer House and Brewery in Yerevan. Opened in 2000, it currently serves 3 types of the Blonder Slovak pilsner unfiltered beer produced in the complex.

=== Beer Academy Yerevan ===
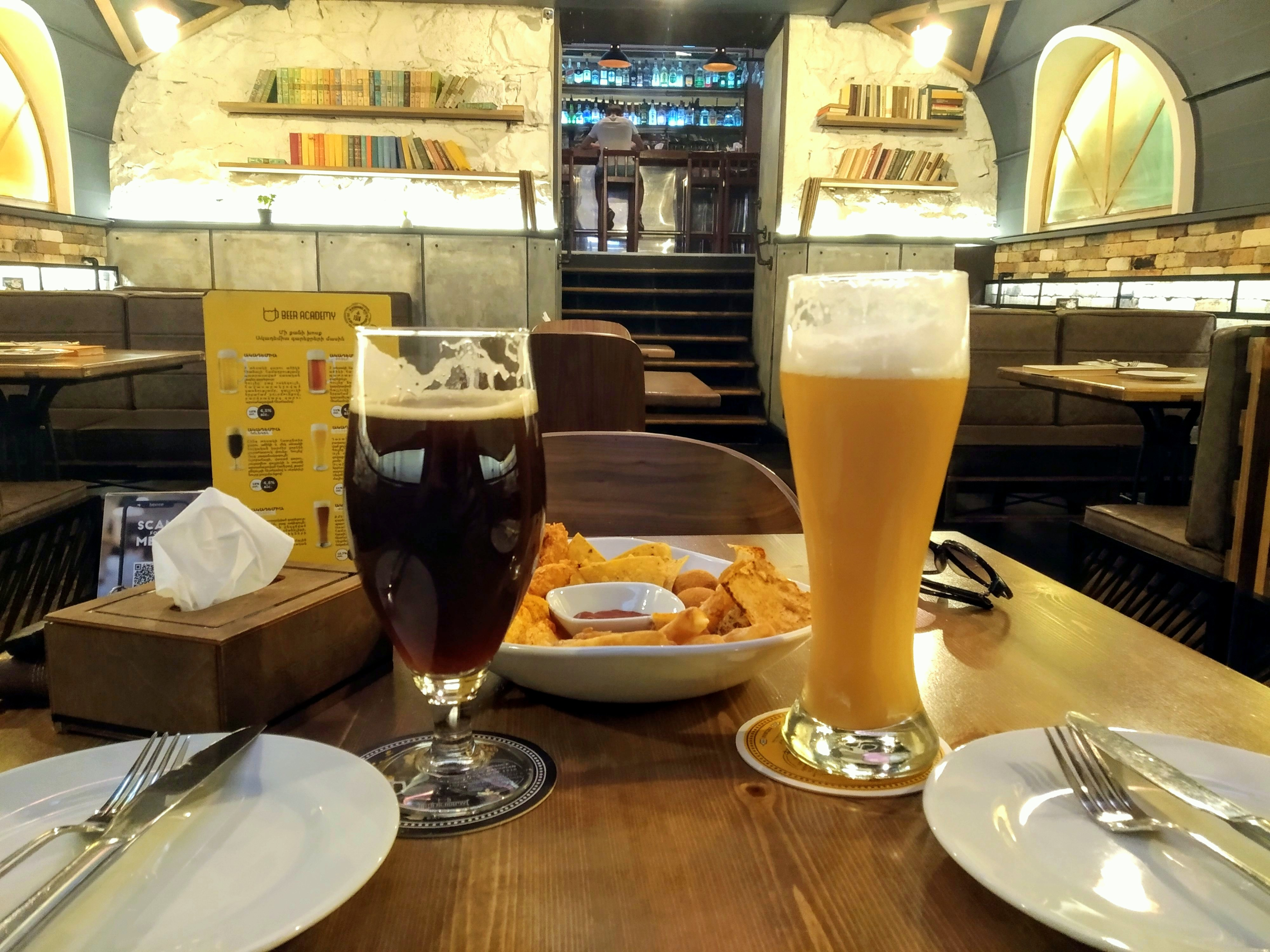
Academia Dunkel (left) and Academia Weizen (right) from Beer Academy Yerevan

- Academia Beer from the Beer Academy brewpub in Yerevan. Opened in 2012, it currently serves 7 types of unfiltered beer produced in the brewpub:
  - Academia Pils, pale lager, 12% wort extract, 4.5% ABV
  - Academia Bitter, bitter semi-dark, 11% wort extract, 4.3% ABV
  - Academia Dunkel, dunkel, 12% wort extract, 4.8% ABV
  - Academia Ginger, lager ginger beer, 12.5% wort extract, 4.7% ABV
  - Academia Hot, warm dunkel, 16.5% wort extract, 2.5% ABV
  - Academia Weizen, wheat beer, 11% wort extract, 4.3% ABV (seasonal, May to October)
  - Academia Weizen Bock, wheat beer dark, 13.7 wort extract, 7% ABV (seasonal, October to May)

=== Tovmas Craft Beer ===
- Tovmas Beer from the Tovmas Craft Beer in Yerevan. Opened in 2016, it currently produces two types of unfiltered beer:
  - Tovmas Light
  - Tovmas Dark

=== Vladimir Hakobyan Brewery ===
- Dovegh's unfiltered beer from the Vladimir Hakobyan Microbrewery, located in the Dovegh village of Tavush Province. Opened in 2017, the microbrewery currently produces:
  - Dovegh's, dark unfiltered, 5% ABV

== See also ==
- Beer in Armenia
- Beer and breweries by region
- Armenian wine
