= Mallam Oubandawaki =

Nigerien Politician

Minister of Justice (Niger)
- In office 7 September 1987 – 20 November 1987
- President: Seyni Kountché
- Preceded by: Hadj Nadjir
- Succeeded by: Abdourahamane Soli

Personal details
- Born: 1945 Tibiri (Dosso), Niger
- Died: 2004 (aged 58–59)
- Occupation: Military officer, politician
- Awards: Officer of the National Order of Niger; Knight of the Legion of Honour; Knight of the National Order of Upper Volta

Military service
- Allegiance: Niger
- Branch/service: Nigerien Armed Forces – Gendarmerie
- Years of service: 1969–1993
- Rank: High Commander of the Gendarmerie
- Unit: Gendarmerie Nationale

Mallam Oubandawaki (also spelled Malam Oubandawaki; 1945–2004) was a Nigerien military officer and politician. He served briefly as Minister of Justice of Niger in 1987 and later as High Commander of the Nigerien Gendarmerie from 1987 to 1993.

== Life ==
Mallam Oubandawaki was born in 1945 in Tibiri, Niger. He attended primary school in Tibiri and later the Lycée National in Niamey, completing his studies in 1966. Afterward, he worked for three years at the customs office and in the private sector.

In 1969, he joined the Nigerien Armed Forces through the Gendarmerie. Following basic training, he was assigned to a brigade in Birni-N’Konni. From 1972 onward, he undertook advanced military training in Tondibiah (Niger), Bouaké (Côte d'Ivoire), and at the École des officiers de la gendarmerie nationale in Melun, France. Upon returning, he became a group commander of the gendarmerie in Niamey in 1976.

In 1976, Head of State Seyni Kountché appointed him as his long-time aide-de-camp. On 7 September 1987, Kountché, then seriously ill, named Oubandawaki Minister of Justice, succeeding Hadj Nadjir. Following Kountché's death, he was replaced on 20 November 1987 by Abdourahamane Soli.

Under Kountché's successor Ali Saïbou, Oubandawaki was promoted on 23 November 1987 to High Commander of the Gendarmerie, a position he held until 7 March 1993. He also served on the national electoral commission for the 1992 constitutional referendum, the 1993 parliamentary elections, and the 1993 presidential elections.

After the transition to civilian rule in 1993, Oubandawaki became advisor to State Minister for National Reconciliation Albert Wright and to Minister of Defense Tahirou Amadou. In 1995, he briefly commanded the first Gendarmerie Legion in Niamey and published his memoirs, J’étais l’aide de camp du Président Kountché, which portrayed Kountché's rule in a positive light.

During the presidency of Ibrahim Baré Maïnassara (1996–1999), Oubandawaki served as prefect of the Diffa Department and later of the Maradi Department.

Mallam Oubandawaki died in 2004.

== Writings ==
- J’étais l’aide de camp du Président Kountché. Niamey: Nouvelle Imprimerie du Niger, 1995.

== Honors ==
- Officer of the National Order of Niger
- Knight of the Legion of Honour
- Knight of the National Order of Upper Volta
