= Douis =

Douis or Doui may refer to:

== People ==
- Gerard Douis, French archer
- Jean-François Douis, French former footballer
- Tahar Douis, Moroccan wrestler of alligators
- Yvon Douis, French former footballer

== Places ==
- Bordj Douis, town and commune in the Djelfa Province of Algeria
- Doui Thabet, town and commune in the Saïda Province of Algeria

== Other uses ==
- Doui-Menia, Arab tribe of the Moroccan-Algerian border
