= Tahar =

Tahar is a masculine given name and surname of Arabic origin. Notable people with the name include:

== Given name ==
- Tahar Allan, Algerian politician
- Tahar Ben Ammar (1889–1985), Tunisian politician
- Tahar Aziz (born 1950), Moroccan boxer
- Tahar Bekri (born 1951), Tunisian poet
- Tahar Chaïbi (1946–2014), Tunisian footballer
- Tahar Cheriaa (1927–2010), Tunisian film critic
- Tahar Djaout (1954–1993), Algerian journalist, poet, and fiction writer
- Tahar Douis, Moroccan wrestler of alligators
- Tahar ben Abdelhak Fennish, Moroccan diplomat
- Tahar Haddad (1899–1935), Tunisian author
- Tahar Hamou (born 1959), Algerian fencer
- Tahar Ben Hassen (born 1941), Tunisian boxer
- Tahar Ben Jelloun (born 1944), Moroccan poet and writer
- Tahar El Khalej (born 1968), Moroccan football player
- Tahar Haddad (1899–1935), Tunisian author, scholar and reformer
- Tahar Lachheb, Tunisian paralympic athlete
- Tahar Lamri, (born 1958), Algerian writer
- Tahar Mansouri (born 1965), Tunisian marathon runner
- Tahar El Materi (1932–2021), Tunisian businessman
- Tahar Chérif El-Ouazzani (born 1967), Algerian footballer
- Tahar Ouettar (1936–2010), Algerian writer
- Tahar Rahim (born 1981), French actor
- Tahar Sfar (1903–1942), Tunisian politician
- Tahar Tamsamani (born 1980), boxer from Morocco who participated in three Olympic tournaments
- Tahar Touati (died 2012), Algerian diplomat
- Tahar Zaouche (1904–1975), Tunisian politician
- Tahar Zbiri (1929–2024), Algerian military officer

== Surname ==
- Amor Ben Tahar (born 1969), Tunisian football player
- Arcandra Tahar (born 1970), Indonesian politician and government minister
- Aymen Tahar (born 1989), Algerian football player
- Zoulikha Tahar (born 1992), Algerian feminist, poet, slameuse and self-taught videographer

== See also ==
- Stade Tahar Zoughari, multi-use stadium in Relizane, Algeria
- Taher (name), including the name Tahir
