= 1992 deportation of Hamas members =

Deportation of Hamas members by Israel

On 16 December 1992, the Israeli government carried out a mass deportation across the Lebanese border of four hundred Palestinian prisoners suspected of membership in the upsurgent Islamist militant organisation Hamas. Triggered by the abduction and murder of an Israeli police officer, the deportation was the largest single mass deportation of Palestinians since the start of the Israeli occupation in 1967.

The mass deportation, however, rapidly sparked severe controversy, with the Lebanese government refusing to allow the deportees into Lebanon, human rights groups raising concerns over the government's attempts to circumvent the right to trial, protests breaking out among Palestinians and Arab citizens of Israel over fears that more mass deportations would come, and with ongoing peace talks between the Israeli government and the Palestinian Liberation Organisation almost collapsing. All of the deportees were ultimately allowed to return from exile by the end of 1993.

While the mass deportation was intended to eliminate Hamas as a viable security threat, it is widely considered to have ultimately backfired, becoming instead a major milestone in the rise of Hamas. The mass deportation significantly raised the profile of Hamas among Palestinians and allowed Hamas to make its first contacts with Hezbollah, who provided the deportees with significant training and material support.

== Background ==
Hamas is a Palestinian nationalist Sunni Islamist political organisation with a military wing, the Qassam Brigades. The organisation originated from the Muslim Brotherhood, which grew substantially in the Gaza Strip during the 1970s and early 1980s under the leadership of Ahmed Yassin and his Mujama al-Islamiya charity. The Brotherhood was initially supported in its growth by the Israeli government, who believed that it could become a less nationalist and more amenable alternative to the secular, leftist Palestinian Liberation Organisation in Palestinian politics.

While Yassin initially believed that the Brotherhood had to focus on Islamicising Palestinian society first before it could fight against Israel, by the mid-1980s, he increasingly turned towards violence. In 1987, during the First Intifada, Yassin re-organised the Brotherhood into Hamas, declaring that the Israeli-Palestinian conflict was a holy war between Muslims and Jews, issuing a founding charter in 1988 that contained genocidally antisemitic language, and carrying out its first attacks on Israeli soldiers in 1989. By 1990, as the First Intifada fell apart under a harsh Israeli crackdown and Palestinian infighting, Hamas had grown significantly, being increasingly seen as a viable, less corrupt, and less compromising alternative to the PLO among Palestinians and increasingly being seen as a serious threat by the Israeli government.

Following the 1992 Israeli legislative election, after which the Israeli Labor Party under Yitzhak Rabin was able to form a coalition government and pursue peace negotiations with the PLO, Hamas stepped up its attacks on Israeli targets and on Palestinians that opposed the group.

== Events ==
=== Trigger ===
On 13 December 1992, a group of Hamas militants murdered Israeli police officer Nissim Toledano. The killing sparked widespread outrage in Israel. In his speech to the Knesset announcing the discovery of the body, Israeli Prime Minister Yitzhak Rabin pledged that "Neither Ahmed Yassin, nor Ahmed Jabril, nor Yasir Arafat will move us from here — we are here to stay. We will suffer setbacks, bite our lips and carry on. Neither stones nor bullets will make us move. Terror has no chance against us," and called for the Israeli military to be "merciless" against Hamas. Minister of Internal Security Moshe Shahal pledged to "avenge the death." The far-right Moledet party called for Hamas supporters to be expelled from the Occupied Territories, while left-wing Meretz party chair Yossi Sarid called for "an iron fist against Hamas." In Toledano's hometown of Lod, there was a minor riot by Jewish Israelis targeting an Arab neighbourhood in the city, also chanting "Death to Arabs" and throwing stones at the house of Mayor of Lod Maxim Levy.

After the body was discovered, the Israeli government initiated a significant crackdown targeting Hamas, including the mass arrest of 1600 Palestinians, and imposition on a ban of travel between the Occupied Palestinian Territories and Jordan.

=== Deportation ===
On the morning of 16 December 1992, the Israeli cabinet held a meeting to discuss a mass deportation of Hamas members to Lebanon. The cabinet voted unanimously in favour of the deportations, save for Minister of Justice David Libai, who abstained.

Shortly thereafter, 418 Palestinian prisoners, mostly alleged Hamas and Palestinian Islamic Jihad members, were handcuffed, blindfolded, and put on busses, and driven towards the Israeli border with Lebanon. Strict military censorship was initially applied to the deportation, and the families of the deportees were not notified, with the goal of speeding up the deportation by carrying it out before any court appeals could be lodged. The busses were forced to stop at the town of Metula, near the Israeli-Lebanon border after news of the ongoing deportation leaked and a group of human rights activists filed a case to pause the deportation with the Supreme Court of Israel. The Supreme Court quickly held a special session, ultimately deciding with a 5 to 2 majority by the end of the day to allow the deportation to proceed. The Supreme Court also ordered the Israeli government to release a formal explanation within one month of its reasons for deporting the prisoners without granting them the right to appeal. 35 of the prisoners were removed from the bus before it continued towards Lebanon. One of those 35, Gazan journalist Taher Shriteh, was shortly afterwards released from Israeli custody entirely, with Shin Bet claiming that he had been accidentally included on the list.

The remaining 383 prisoners were subsequently offloaded at the northern edge of the Israeli-occupied South Lebanon security belt in the nighttime, being given fifty dollars each, some food provisions, and jackets.

The Government of Lebanon, however, refused to allow the alleged Hamas members to leave the Israeli security zone and enter unoccupied Lebanon. The Lebanese military was placed on high alert and deployed to block the roads between the Israeli occupied and unoccupied zones. Lebanese Prime Minister Rafic Hariri stated that he would not allow Israel to use Lebanon as a dumping ground, and claimed that "If any harm befalls any of the deportees, Israel will be responsible for it."

=== Time in exile ===
Being neither allowed to return to the Palestinian Territories or move into non-occupied Lebanese territory, the four hundred deportees rapidly found themselves stuck in the southern Lebanese desert in winter. The deportees initially made two attempts to walk back towards the Palestinian Territories, but gave up after the Israeli-allied South Lebanon Army fired at them. The Israeli military also placed landmines across the most common paths south and deployed reinforcements into the occupied security zone, including a unit of commandos.

The deportees eventually set up an encampment together in the mountains near the village of Marj al-Zuhour, naming it "Camp Jerusalem for the Return." In the encampment, the deportees organised themselves under an Islamist and "work-if-you-want-to-eat" structure, attempting to take care of basic functions like building latrines, starting fires for heat, cooking food, doing laundry, fetching water, and doing their prayers. Ten of the deportees had medical training, and some of the others had training in engineering, with over one hundred having a higher education degree. The deportees also set up a classroom, which they dubbed a university, giving lectures and holding debates with each other. As well, the deportees regularly held press conferences for international reporters visiting the camps, with Abdel Aziz al-Rantisi serving as spokesperson. Almost all of the deportees, on the other hand, had no previous experience with snow, weather conditions in the mountains were harsh, on the whole, the deportees had minimal provisions, and they faced frequent arguments between the Hamas members and the Palestinian Islamic Jihad members.

The deportees initially received some humanitarian aid from NGOs in the neighbourhood, notably the International Committee of the Red Cross, as well as from United Nations Interim Force in Lebanon troops. However, the Israeli government subsequently announced that it would ban NGOs from travelling through Israeli-held zones to deliver humanitarian aid to the deportees. The announcement came following a meeting of the cabinet in which Rabin clashed with Minister of Foreign Affairs Shimon Peres, who opposed blocking the NGOs. The cabinet ultimately voted 8 to 6 in favour of blocking the NGOs, with three ministers abstaining. The Lebanese government also moved to block the NGOs from providing aid to the deportees, and attempted to order the deportees to march south.

Unlike the NGOs, however, one group was able to defy the Lebanese and Israeli governments and provide aid to the deportees: the armed, Islamist, and violently anti-Israel paramilitary Hezbollah. Hezbollah would provide the deportees not only with basic aid, but would also use the opportunity to forge strong links between itself and the deported Hamas members as terrorists, despite the religious differences between them. Hezbollah, a stronger and more experience terrorist organisation, provided Hamas deportees with military training and education in military tactics, including education on explosives and how to do suicide bombings. Through Hezbollah, the Hamas deportees would also forge links with the Islamic Republic of Iran and its Islamic Revolutionary Guard Corps. As the time in exile stretched on, the Hamas members and Palestinian Islamic Jihad members among the deportees would also gradually reconcile and agree to cooperate in future endeavours.

=== Protests ===
The deportations sparked immediate protests in Palestine, with activists in some cities calling for general strikes. Several Palestinians in the Gaza Strip would be shot and killed by Israeli forces when some protests evolved into riots.

The deportations also sparked protests within Israel, particularly among Arab citizens of Israel, and with some protests being organised by the Peace Now movement. Arab Israelis held a one-day general strike on 22 December in protest against the deportation. Hadash MK Tawfiq Ziad was suspended for five sessions of the Knesset after a particularly heated outburst against the deportations in the Knesset, while MK Hashem Mahameed faced calls for his parliamentary immunity to be revoked after he called for Palestinians to re-launch the First Intifada. On 28 December, a group of Arab Israeli leaders attempted to deliver humanitarian aid to the deportees, but were blocked by Israeli police.

=== Political and diplomatic crises ===
The deportations sparked serious concerns about the viability of the ongoing peace negotiations between the Israeli government. The PLO leadership, under pressure from their relative distance from the First Intifada's Unified National Leadership of the Uprising, the rise of the more grassroots Hamas, growing dissatisfaction over the slow pace of the peace negotiations, as well as a significant internal financial crisis, initially announced that it would withdraw from negotiations until the Israeli government reversed the deportation.

The deportations also led to significant controversy within internal Israeli politics. By the end of January 1993, cabinet ministers were anonymously briefing the Israeli press that Rabin had forced the decision through the cabinet without allowing the cabinet to properly debate the deportation. Minister of Health Haim Ramon publicly claimed in early February 1993 that the cabinet had assumed that the Lebanese government would be too weak to prevent Israel from deporting Hamas into its borders, saying that "we did not know Lebanon is a state again. We thought of it as the Wild West."

The deportation also sparked significant infighting within the left-wing Meretz party, a member of the governing coalition, after its government ministers had supported the deportation, while the grassroots party members strongly opposed the deportation. Following the cabinet vote, Minister of Energy and prominent Meretz figure Amnon Rubinstein stated that while he had "a legal problem with the decision," his "duty is not to criticize but to choose from three major alternatives: do nothing, do this or do something worse. I decided to vote for this. It wasn't easy."

Internal Israeli arguments over the deportations were amplified by the killing of Haim Nahmani, an Israeli intelligence officer, by one of his Hamas informants in the upscale Jerusalem neighbourhood of Rehavia in early January 1993. According to Michael Parks of The Los Angeles Times, "the pressure on Shin Bet broadened from the crackdown on Hamas to a reassessment of the elite intelligence and security service itself. Was Shin Bet, Israelis asked, up to the new threats posed by members of the militant Muslim organizations?" Rabin subsequently refused to attend Nahmani's funeral.

=== Return to Palestine ===
As controversy over the mass deportation sparked, the Israeli government initially refused to consider allowing the deportees to return to the Palestinian Territories. Rabin stated in late December 1992 that "I have no pity in my heart, nor do I shed tears," and pledged that his government "will fight any manifestation of violence and terror, and it will not allow either Hamas or the Islamic Jihad to harm citizens of Israel," adding that "Israel will not let itself be bound, either by hand or foot. When it comes to our own security, and the security of our children, only we will decide what is best for us."

On 28 December 1992, however, the Israeli government announced that ten of the deportees had been wrongly deported, and would be allowed to return to the Palestinian Territories. One week later, on 3 January 1993, the Israeli government announced that eleven more of the deportees would be allowed to return, six of them for having been wrongly deported and five for health reasons.

In early February 1993, the Israeli government announced that it would let over one hundred of the deportees return from exile, in a deal brokered by the United States government. Later that month, United States Secretary of State Warren Christopher made an official visit to Israel in which he warned Rabin that the situation of the deportees was still posing a major obstacle in peace negotiations, and pressured the Israeli government to reach a deal to bring back most of the deportees by the end of the summer.

In mid-August 1993, the Israeli government announced that it had reached a deal with the deportees to allow all of them to return from exile. The return would take place over two stages, without about half returning in September 1993 and the rest in December 1993. By mid-December 1993, all the deportees had returned.

== Reactions ==
=== In Israel ===
A Yedioth Ahronoth poll taken shortly after the deportation found that 91% of Jewish Israelis supported the deportation, although 26% had concerns that it might lead to further violence. Likud MK and former Deputy Prime Minister Moshe Nissim stated that the deportation gave him "a sense of relief." David Toledano, the brother of the murdered police officer, stated that "the whole world that condemns us doesn’t think about the fact that they are killing people here, people who are not sitting in the rain crying and who will not be able to come back. Nobody thinks about that." The parents of Iris Azulai, an Israeli who had been murdered by Hamas in 1990, stated that "if the government had adopted a policy of deportation before this incident, our daughter would still be alive."

Rabin defended the deportation as humane, saying that "We did not harm anyone, we did not kill anyone, we did not damage anyone's property. Don't forget the alternatives--the death penalty, demolishing houses, mass arrests."

Only one Israeli Labor Party MK, Yael Dayan, publicly opposed the deportation, accusing her party's government of falling for an "atmosphere of hysteria."

=== In Palestine ===
Palestinian lawyer and peace negotiations advisor Ziad Abuzayyad stated that the deportation would weaken "those who support the peace process. It will give substance to the opposition's claims that we are tools of Israel in carrying out the repressive measures of the occupation." Palestinian negotiator Sari Nusseibeh warned that "this will make people extremely angry and frustrated, beyond what they already are" and accused the Israeli of trying to undermine "the standing of the [Palestinian negotiating] delegation in the community." Fatah leader in the Gaza Strip Assad Saftawi stated that deportations "will never end the violence, and it will increase the frustration Palestinians feel. It will push them to more violence, because they are losing hope."

Hamas reacted harshly to the deportation, saying that it was now in a state of "total war" against the Israeli government and pledging that they would no longer limit their attacks to just Israeli soldiers, but would instead attack "every Zionist in Palestine."

=== Internationally ===
On 18 December 1992, the United Nations Security Council unanimously and without abstentions passed Resolution 799 condemning the deportation. Secretary-General of the United Nations Boutros Boutros-Ghali called for the Israeli government to "rescind the expulsion order."

The European Economic Community called for the Israeli government to "allow the deportees to return immediately." The Australian Department of Foreign Affairs and Trade expressed "deep concern" over the deportation. Egyptian Minister of Foreign Affairs Amr Moussa stated that "the deportees must be allowed to return, whether they belong to Hamas or Fatah or any other faction," saying that the Israeli government did not have "the right to deport them collectively."

American White House Press Secretary Marlin Fitzwater called for "an end to all forms of violence" and for countries in the Middle East to "avoid reactions such as deportations that risk complicating the search for peace." The Conference of Presidents of Major American Jewish Organizations released a statement supporting the deportation, saying that "all Americans who support the cause of peace in the Middle East and reconciliation between Arab and Jew will understand the reasons for Israel’s action" and that "Hamas has declared war on Israel. Israel must defend itself." Union of American Hebrew Congregations president Alexander M. Schindler also released a statement in support of the deportation, saying that "Israel was right to act as it did — forcefully yet legally."

Amnesty International stated that it was "seriously concerned" by the deportation, saying that the Hamas members "should be charged and given a prompt and fair trial, or be released," and not unilaterally deported without a trial.

== Analysis ==
=== Contemporary assessments ===
Gil Sedan of the Jewish Telegraphic Agency wrote in late December 1992 that "there is little doubt [Hamas] has gained politically" from the deportation and that "the expulsions have only intensified the unhappiness of PLO supporters, who now see no option but to demonstrate support for their rivals." Sedan added that the boost in support for Hamas was "particularly evident in the West Bank town of Hebron, a traditional stronghold of the Islamic fundamentalist movement," with almost eighty of the deportees being from Hebron, and that "Hebron residents believe the fundamentalists have their interests at heart to a much greater degree than the PLO does. They say Hamas uses much of the money it gets from Saudi Arabia and Iran to fund schools and welfare activities, while the PLO is more interested in maintaining a bloated organizational bureaucracy." In another article for the Jewish Telegraphic Agency, Sedan wrote that the incident highlighted that Hamas was "gaining support in the administered territories in the past year as hopes faded for a quick breakthrough in the peace process," saying that " support is growing in the territories, particularly in the Gaza Strip, for the proposition that rifles should speak in the absence of gains by the PLO. Some on the left side of the Israeli political spectrum are saying that Jerusalem is learning too late that a government that rejects the PLO as a negotiating partner will find itself compelled to talk to Hamas. Moreover, there is fear that the success of the Hamas and of the competing Islamic Jihad organization may radicalize secular groups associated with the PLO."

Elie Rekhess of Tel Aviv University told The New York Times in late December 1992 that the Arab Israeli protests against the deportation were "unprecedented," saying that "the mass deportation touched on one of the most sensitive issues for any Palestinian - the fear, real or imagined, of being deported." In late January 1993, historian Abraham Rabinovich described the deportation as a "disaster for Israel" and "an acute embarrassment," saying that among Palestinians it represented a "traumatic reminder" of the 1948 Nakba "and a warning of what a future Israeli government might attempt to do."

In April 1993, Amin Saikal of the Australian National University described the deportation as "ill-considered," saying that "if the deportation was designed to stem the rising tide of the intifada and taint it with the label of 'Islamic fanaticism', and thus raise world sympathy for Israel, it has certainly backfired. It has not only further complicated Israel's international position, but also lifted Hamas's profile among the Palestinians and prompted the secularist Palestine Liberation Organisation to stand shoulder-to-shoulder with Hamas in support of the deportees."

David E. Hoffman of The Washington Post wrote in December 1993 that, "today, Hamas appears unbowed... the scattered cells of its armed guerrillas remain one of the most violent and elusive of the Palestinian rejectionist organizations in the territories, and have lately switched their targets from Israeli soldiers to Jewish settlers," adding that "the deportation appears to have done little to dim Hamas's appeal to the poverty-ridden younger generation of Palestinians born since Israel captured the West Bank and Gaza Strip in 1967" and that, instead, "the biggest setback to Hamas over the last year was Israel's mutual recognition of the secular, nationalist PLO, immediately boosting the PLO's standing among Palestinians just as it seemed to be falling apart." Ifrah Zilberman of the Hebrew University of Jerusalem warned Hoffman that "this type of organization is organic, and it has very strong powers of regeneration. It is running from the grass roots and the masses up -- not like the PLO, which is running from the top down. In time, people move ahead in Hamas, and the ability of Hamas to organize the streets has regrown. Probably today it is quite close to what it was in the past."

In October 1994, Robert Fisk of The Independent wrote that the deportees had become "the most famous Palestinian refugees in the world," saying that the deportation "almost wrecked the Washington-brokered peace talks, their exile almost - and [the deportees] noted with cynicism the qualification 'almost' - provoked the UN Security Council to vote for sanctions against Israel. But once Mr Rabin produced a timetable for their return, the Arab states went back to their peace talks. The following September, the Hamas men at Marj el-Zuhour learnt that Mr Arafat had done a secret deal with Israel. 'Betrayal,' was what their banners - cracking from flag poles in the cracked earth - said. From then on, they talked of destroying Mr Arafat." Fisk added that "the men of Marj el-Zuhour were planning their Islamic republic on the hillside, forming the political nucleus of a group which might otherwise have no political strategy."

=== Historical assessments ===
In 2011, Israeli human rights organisation B'Tselem wrote that "in deporting the Palestinians, Israel unilaterally ignored its obligation to persons under its control. Such a violation cannot be justified in light of the violent acts committed by Palestinians in 1992. It is precisely in "emergency situations" that a state's commitment to human rights is tested. Unfortunately, Israel failed this test in December 1992." B'Tselem further described the deportation as an act of "collective punishment," adding that the "decision to deport was taken hastily, based on unclear and sweeping criteria."

In 2016, David Hoffman of the Institute for National Security Studies wrote that the deportation was "intended to damage the organisational infrastructure and operational capabilities" of Hamas and the PIJ, but that it "amounted to a 'terrorism school' in which the deportees learned new highly destructive tactics that they implemented in Israel upon their return." Hoffman further wrote that the deportation had major effects on Hamas, including giving it the opportunity to make connections with Hezbollah and the Islamic Republic of Iran who provided Hamas with training and equipment (despite Hamas and Hezbollah being on different sides of the Sunni-Shia conflict), notably representing an experience that inspired Hamas to begin carrying out suicide bombings in the following years, and in significantly raising the profile of Hamas as a resistance group among Palestinians, with several of the deportees becoming prominent figures in Palestinian politics in the 21st century.

In 2020, Elad Ben-Dror of Bar-Ilan University wrote that "the goal of the mass deportation was to deal a mortal blow to Hamas," but that "media coverage and the deportees’ awareness that their deportation had created a major uproar prompted them to take advantage of their time in Marj al-Zuhur to project their movement as a significant player in the Palestinian arena." Ben-Dror added that "rather than hurting Hamas, the deportation bolstered the movement, bringing it into the center of regional and international attention. The episode also made it possible for Hamas to deepen its ties outside the Palestinian arena and its Muslim Brotherhood affiliates."

In 2025, Magnus Ranstorp of the Swedish Defence University wrote that the deportation was "a catalyst for [Hamas's] transformation into a far more capable and internationally connected movement... Instead of fragmenting the movement, Israel had inadvertently created a strategic incubator." Ranstorp stated that the exile allowed Hamas members to forge tighter links among themselves (with many Gazan and West Bank members meeting each other in person for the first time), boosted the organisation's legitimacy by turning it into a symbol of Palestinian resilience, and allowed the organisation to form a strong alliance with Hezbollah and Iran (including military training and financial subsidies).
