= Tair =

Tair may refer to:

- Tair, Egyptian princess, daughter of Ahmose I and his secondary wife, Kasmut.

Tair is derived from "altair", the Arabic word for a bird.

- Tair Airways
- Tair Carn Uchaf
- Tair (lens), a Soviet telephoto prime lens series manufactured by Zenit.

TAIR may refer to:

- The Arabidopsis Information Resource, a database on Arabidopsis thaliana genome

Tairov may refer to:

- Alexander Tairov (1885-1950), a Russia theatre director
- Tairov, a village in the Armavir Province of Armenia

== See also ==
- Taer (disambiguation)
- Tahir
