= Taer =

Taer may refer to:

- Taer (Dungeons & Dragons), a fictional monster
- Ta'er Temple, a Tibetan gompa in Qinghai, China
- Ta'er Temple (Suoyang City), a ruined Buddhist temple in Gansu, China
- Taer 2, an Iranian missile
- TAER Andalus, a former airline

== See also ==
- Tair (disambiguation)
- Taher
