= Kandine Mallam Adam =

Nigerien Politician

Minister of Justice of Niger
- In office 1993–1994
- Succeeded by: Tahirou Amadou

Personal details
- Occupation: Politician

Kandine Mallam Adam is a Nigerien politician who served as Minister of Justice (Keeper of the Seals) in the Third Republic of Niger. He held this position from 1993 to 1994 under the presidency of Mahamane Ousmane.

== Political career ==
Kandine Mallam Adam assumed office as the Minister of Justice, overseeing judicial affairs and legal policy, as part of the government formed during the Third Republic. His tenure concluded in 1994 when he was succeeded by Tahirou Amadou.

During his tenure, Amnesty International addressed several appeals to his ministry regarding allegations of torture and deaths in custody.
