= Surp Hovhannes Church of Voskevaz =

7th-12th century church in Armenia

Surp Hovhannes Church Սուրբ Յովհաննէս Եկեղեցի
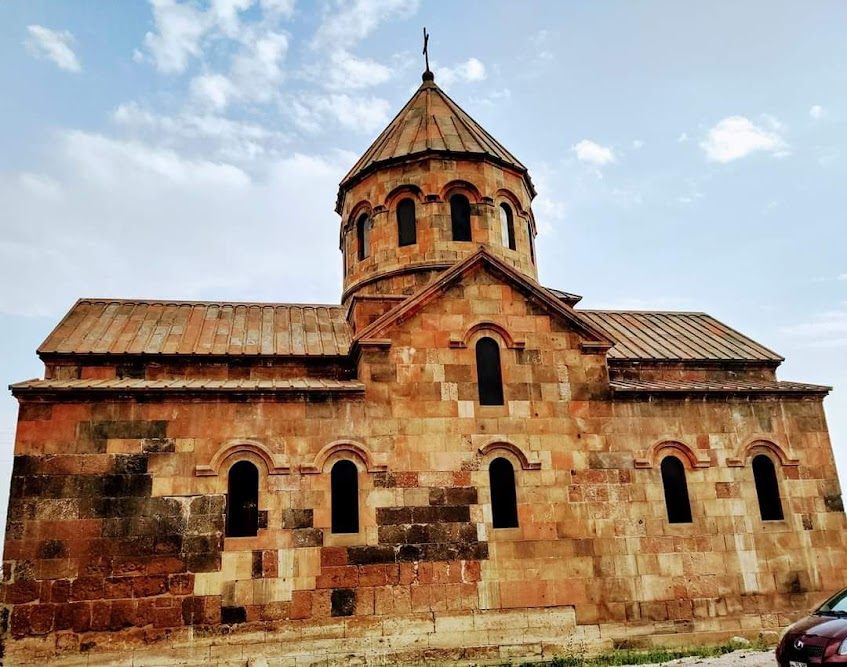
- The basilica of S. Hovhannes at Voskevaz with the dome restored

- Location within Armenia Location within Aragatsotn

Religion
- Affiliation: Armenian Apostolic Church

Location
- Location: Voskevaz village, Aragatsotn Province, Armenia
- Coordinates: 40.27328°N 44.29825°E

Architecture
- Type: Basilica
- Style: Armenian
- Completed: 7th to 12th centuries
- Dome: 1, now collapsed

Surp Hovhannes (Armenian: Սուրբ ՅովհաննԷս Եկեղեցի; meaning Saint John) or Voskevaz Church (Armenian: Ոսկեվազ եկեղեցի) is a 7th- to 12th-century basilica located in the village of Voskevaz in the Aragatsotn Province of Armenia.

== Architecture ==
The church of S. Hovhannes is a large cruciform central plan interior and rectangular exterior plan type basilica. It is missing the drum and dome that once stood above. Two portals lead into the church. Much of the church is void of any decoration.

== Renovation ==
The structure is currently (as of late 2009) being renovated and parts are being reconstructed.

== Gallery ==
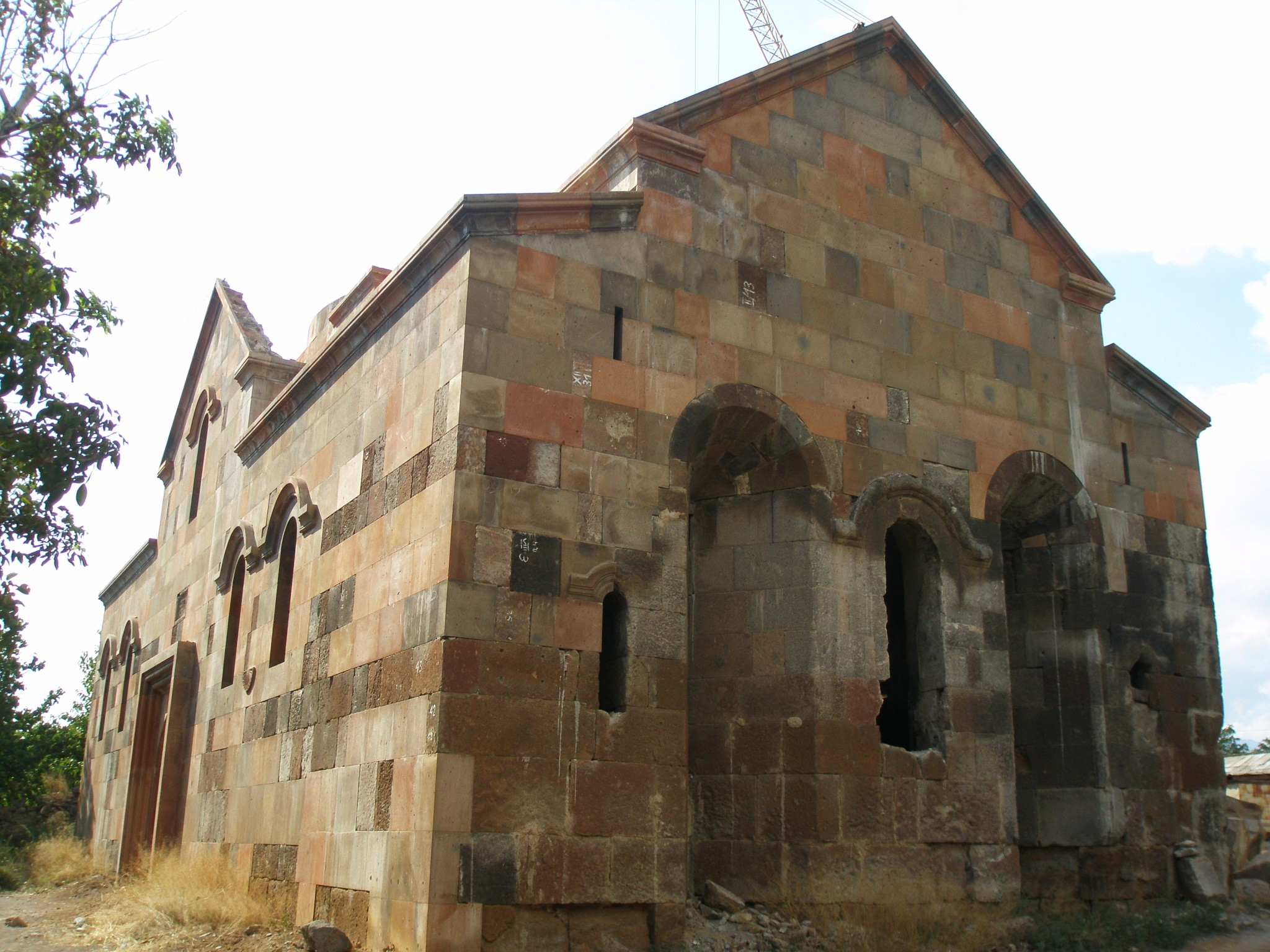
Voskevaz church from another angle.

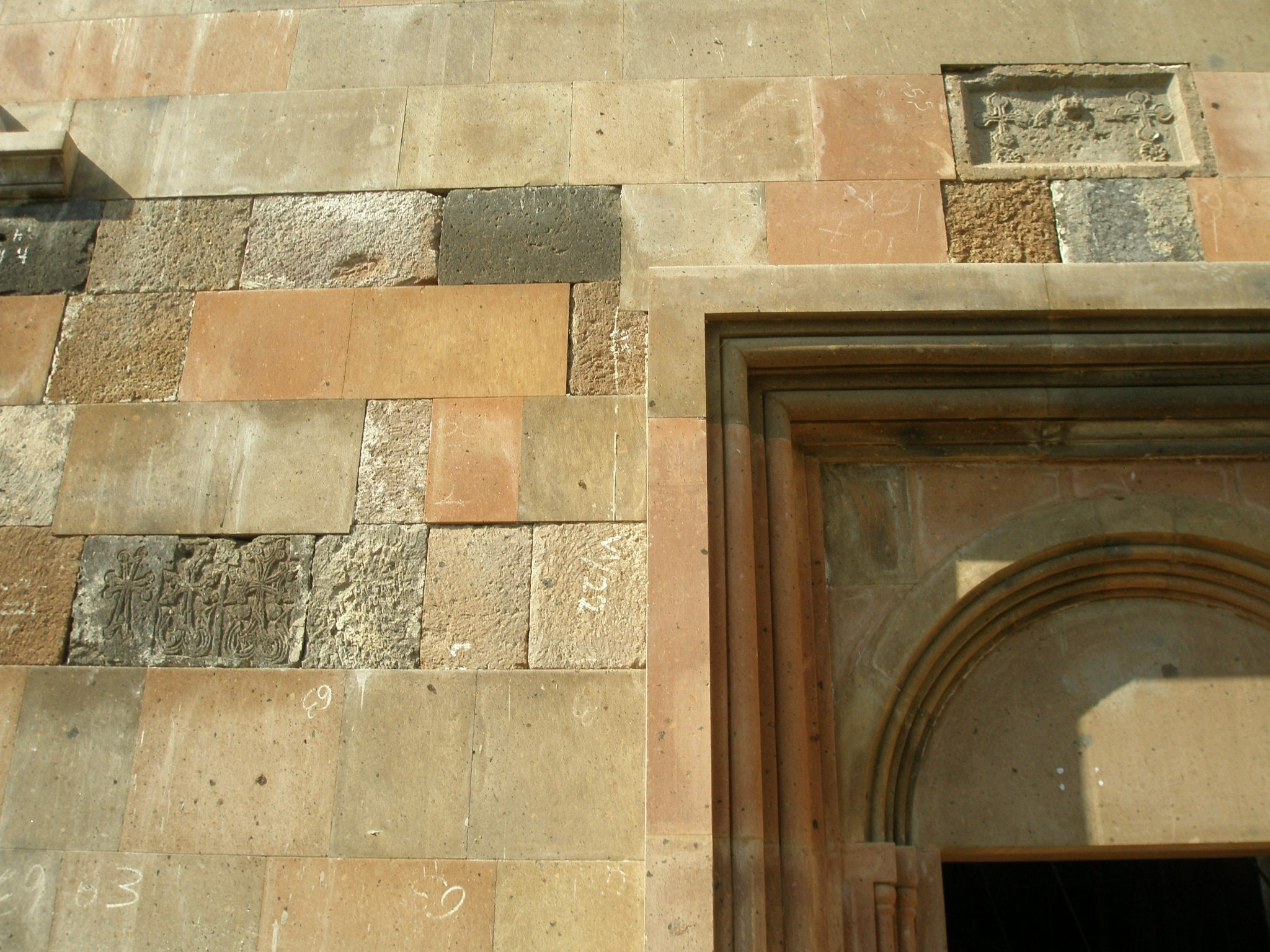
The main portal of the church.
