= Córdoba Airport =

Córdoba Airport Aeropuerto de Córdoba
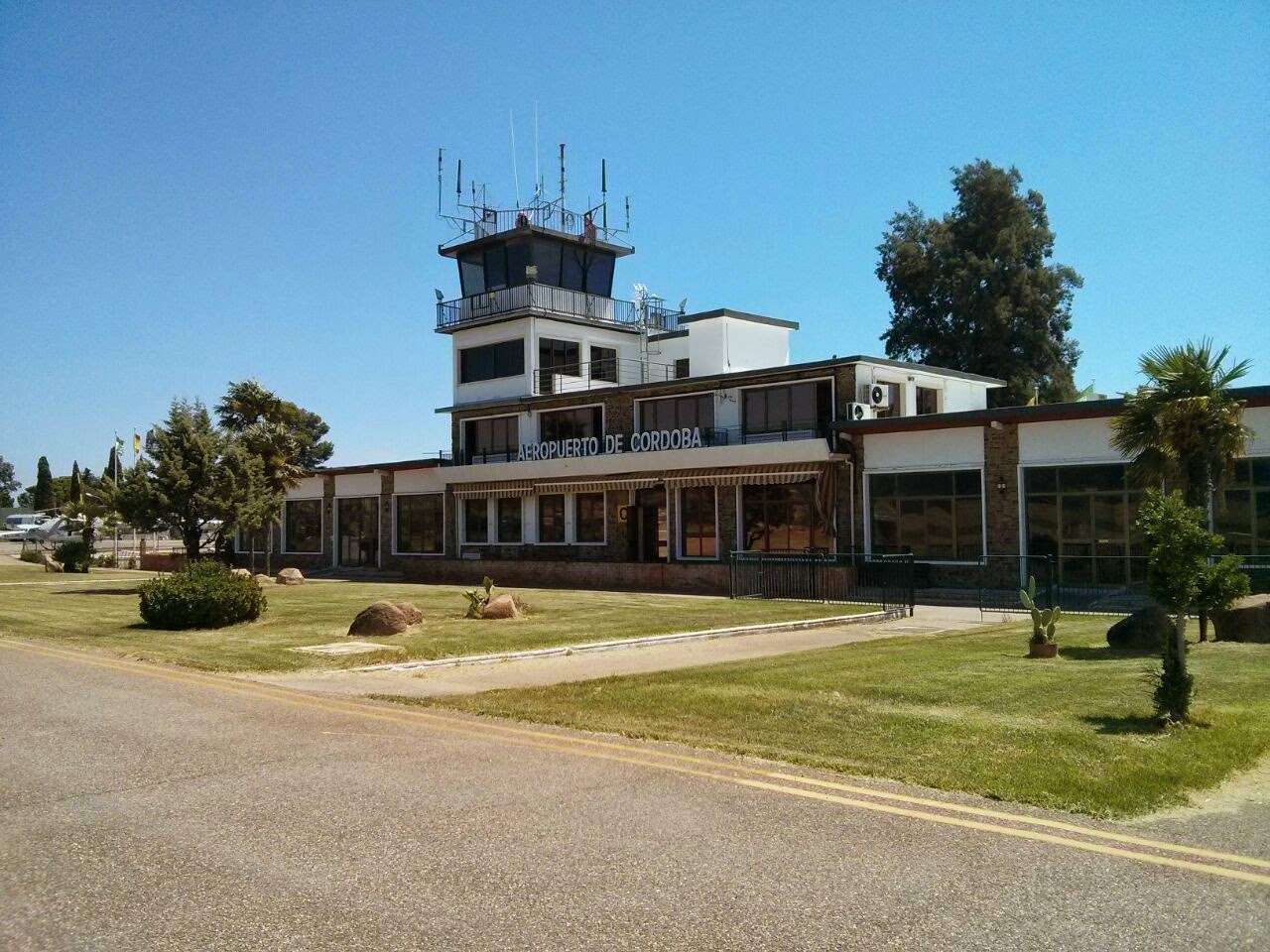
- IATA: ODB; ICAO: LEBA

Summary
- Airport type: Public
- Operator: AENA
- Location: Córdoba, Andalusia, Spain
- Elevation AMSL: 296 ft (90 m)
- Coordinates: 37°50′36″N 4°50′31″W
- Website: aena.es

Map
- Location within Spain

Runways
Direction	Length		Surface
Direction	ft	m	Surface
03/21	7,497	2,285	Asphalt

Statistics (2025)
- Passengers: 30,797
- Passenger change 24-25: ▲263.4%

Córdoba Airport (Spanish: Aeropuerto de Córdoba) (IATA: ODB, ICAO: LEBA) is an airport located 6 kilometres (3.7 mi) from the central business district of the city of Córdoba, Andalusia, Spain.

== History ==
=== Foundation and early years ===
In the late 1950s, various groups and individuals in Córdoba promoted a campaign for the construction of a commercial airport. The initiative received little interest from the Ministry of the Air Force. For this reason, the City council of Córdoba, under directives of the mayor Antonio Cruz Conde and the architect José Rebollo Dicenta, had to take charge of the funding. The project was approved by the Council of Ministers on September 14, 1956, with the understanding that, once the works were completed, the airport would be transferred to the State.

The airport was inaugurated on May 25, 1958, although the air traffic authorization did not arrive until October. On November 5, the first flight to Madrid with the Aviaco company took place, using a Heron twelve-seater four-engine plane, which would later be replaced by a DC-3. The Córdoba-Jérez line was inaugurated in 1960, although its low profitability forced the Córdoba City Council and the provincial council to pay half of the expenses to maintain it.

In 1965, as indicated by the agreement for its construction, the airport became part of the State Heritage, being attached to the Ministry of the Air. After serious economic problems, the Aviaco company stopped operating at the airport in 1967, although it returned two years later due to the subsidization of 60% of the seats by the provincial council. However, in 1980, Aviaco definitively ended its commercial lines in Córdoba. That same year, the expansion and remodeling of the terminal took place. In 1983, the Mallorcan company Air Condal began operating flights to Madrid and Palma de Mallorca, although they only operated for two years. In 1995, there was a further expansion of the runway.

=== Development since 2000 ===
For a short period, in 2008, FlySur airline operated flights from this airport to Vigo, Barcelona, and Bilbao, being the only regular lines that left from it in a long time. Currently, the airline Trabajos Aéreos Espejo offers an air taxi service to many destinations.

On July 31, 2007, the mayor of Córdoba, Rosa Aguilar, together with the deputy mayor Rafael Blanco Perea, and the deputy mayor of urban planning in the Cordovan capital, met with representatives of AENA (Aeropuertos Españoles y Navegación Aérea) with the intention of expediting the proposals to expand the aviation compound located 6 kilometers southwest of Córdoba. The agreement consisted of a new platform, a new control tower, expanding the runway to 2,050 meters long from end to end (2,285 meters usable) and 60 meters wide, and all the necessary facilities being operational within two years to house commercial flights. For this, AENA agreed to take charge of the appropriation of the surrounding land so that the work could be completed in the summer of 2009.

In mid-June 2009, over 50% of the affected homes had been demolished and the provisional control tower was completely finished and awaiting the hiring of air traffic controllers. During the month of August 2010, the runway was closed for expansion, with limited helicopter access. After the completion of the runway expansion works, the dimensions of the strip were 2,410 meters long and 300 wide. In December 2014 the Court of Auditors of the European Union recognized that money has been squandered in the expansion of several airports in Spain, and among them the Cordovan airport was listed as an example. The expansion project estimated a total of 179,000 annual travelers but in 2014 only 7,000 used it.

For summer 2024, Air Nostrum will commence seasonal flights to both Las Palmas and Palma De Mallorca on behalf of Iberia.

== Description ==
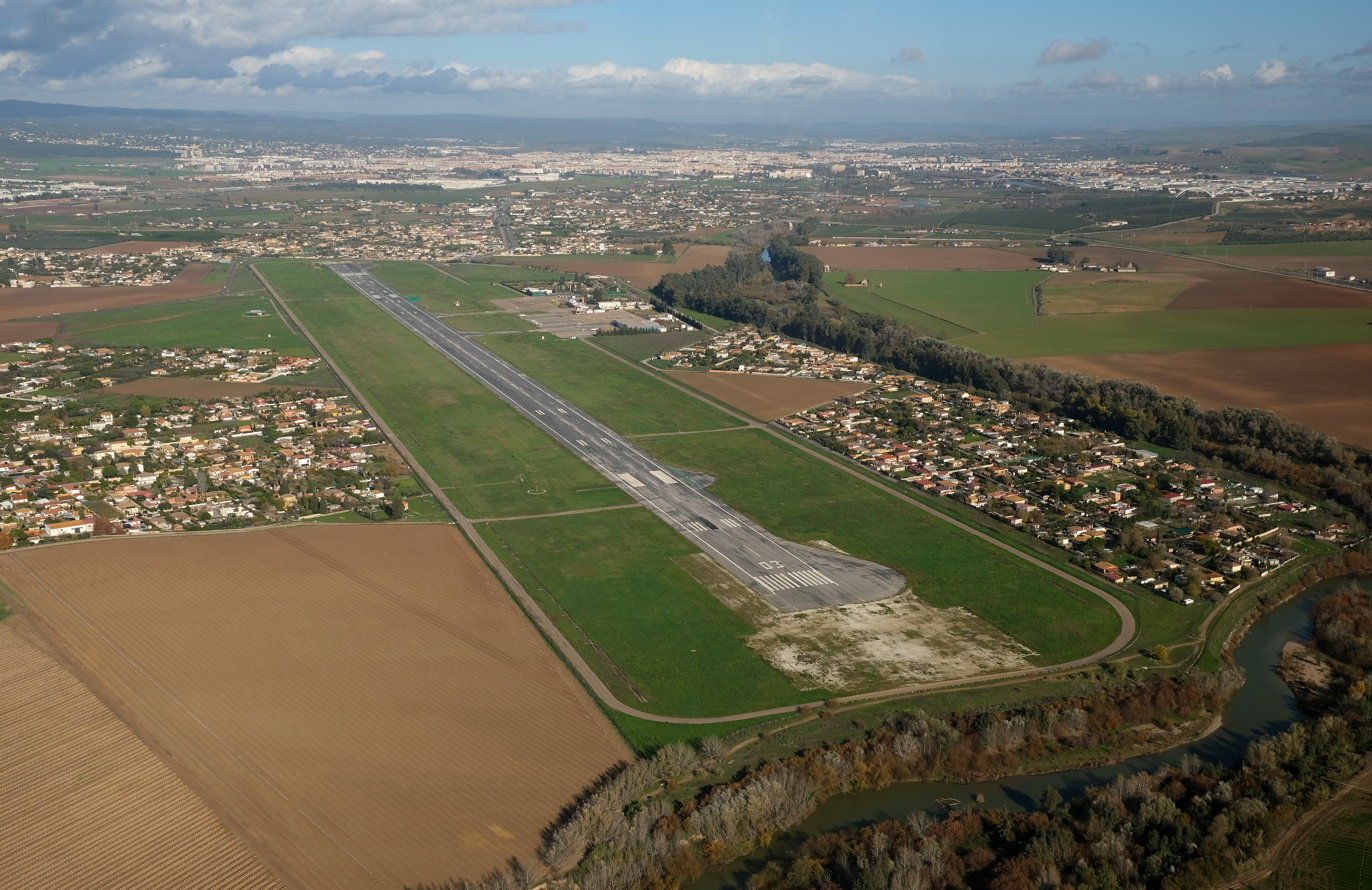
Aerial view

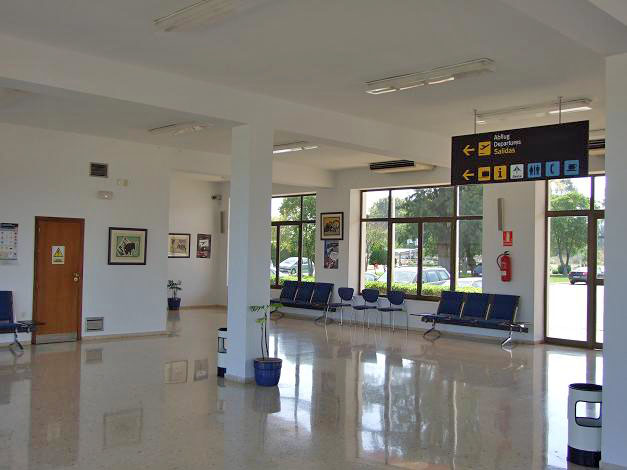
Terminal interior

The airport has two runways: RWY03 measuring 2,076m by 45 meters, and RWY21 measuring 2,241m by 45m. It also features a platform of approximately 43,000 square meters. The passenger terminal is located on the ground floor of the main building and includes the departures, arrivals, cafeteria, services, and administration offices area. The airport also has a service building and a general aviation area, which has hangars, warehouses, and offices.

Traffic at the Córdoba airport consists mainly of general aviation flights. In 2008, it managed 22,268 passengers, with a very marked seasonality in the summer months, making it one of the public airports in Spain with the lowest passenger traffic.

The airport does not have a major impact on the activity of the city of Córdoba or the province in general due to the absence of regular flights. It does have a high impact on the Reina Sofía University Hospital due to the number of transplants that are performed in this health center with organs delivered by air.

== Operations ==
The airport is open to national and international traffic from countries signing the Schengen Agreement, where the AFIS service (Aerodrome Flight Information Service) is provided. For the most part, it is used by agricultural treatment companies, organ transfers to and from the transplant center to the Reina Sofía University Hospital, military flights, passenger charter flights, aerial photographs, piloting courses, skydiving schools and other aerial work. The airport's operational hours are between 9 am and 8 pm. These hours are divided into two schedules, depending on the type of flight. For commercial flights it lists the "hours of public use". These coincide with the hours of the AFIS service, from 12:00 pm to 3:00 pm, Monday through Friday. Commercial flights do not operate in the rest of the hours, called "restricted use hours", though an extension may be requested.

== Airlines and destinations ==
The following airlines operate regular scheduled and charter flights at Córdoba Airport:

Airlines	Destinations
Binter Canarias	Gran Canaria
Volotea	Madrid (begins 4 December 2026)
Vueling	Barcelona
