= Tahira =

Tahira طاهرة
- Pronunciation: Tahera, Tahira
- Gender: Female

Origin
- Origin: Semitic (Arabic)
- Meaning: Pure, Virtuous
- Region of origin: Arabia (Middle East)

Other names
- Variant form: Taher (male)

Tahira (Arabic: طاهرة) is an Arabic name for females. There are several Semitic variations that include connotations given in Africa, Asia, and Europe. It is traditionally a given name for Muslims. It is the female variant of male name Tahir.

Tahira may refer to:

== Given name ==
- Tahira Ismael-Sansawi, Filipino politician
- Tahira Syed (born 1958), Pakistani singer
- Tahira Tahirova (1913–1991), Azerbaijani politician

== See also ==
- Tahir
- Táhirih
