= Taher Shriteh =

Palestinian journalist

Taher Shriteh is a Palestinian-American businessperson and former journalist.

== Biography ==
In 1984, he was offered admission to study a master's in mechanical engineering at the University of Wisconsin–Milwaukee, in the United States. He returned to Palestine in 1986, however, after being unable to afford the tuition fees to complete his studies. Soon after his return to Palestine, he became involved in journalism after meeting Reuters correspondent Paul Taylor. He would subsequently provide reports in events in the Gaza Strip for a number of international news agencies, including Reuters, The New York Times, the BBC, CBS, and Voice of America.

In December 1987, after the outbreak of the First Intifada, he was arrested by the Israeli military and detained for two days in solitary confinement, during which he was beaten. In October 1989, the Israeli military raided his home, seizing his reporting material and notebooks, claiming that a need to investigate whether he had been inciting demonstrations during the First Intifada. The raid caused significant controversy, both with claims that the Israeli government was attempting to suppress coverage of its actions during the Intifada and after the military began ordering the sources in Shriteh's notebooks to present themselves at the military headquarters in Gaza City.

He was arrested again in January 1991, being placed in administrative detention by Shin Bet. The Israeli government accused Shriteh of having "given aid to an enemy organization" due to his reporting on the new, upsurgent Islamic nationalist group Hamas. Shriteh claimed that he had translated popularly-circulated Hamas leaflets and passed the translations on to Reuters as part of routine journalism of current events in Gaza. Shriteh also accused the Israeli authorities of abusing him during his detention. In 1999, he wrote that:

"Most of the time I was in solitary confinement. The one by one-and-a-half yard cell was windowless, wet and cold. There were no blankets. It was January and I could not sleep in the cold. I could only use the toilet once a day, when the Shin Bet officer allowed me to. Sometimes, I was forced to sit on a baby chair with my hands and my feet cuffed and my head covered by a sack made of thick fabric. I was isolated from the outside world for 26 consecutive days. I lost track of the time and the date. I also lost 28 pounds."

During his detention, Human Rights Watch called for his release, saying that his case was "of particular interest because it sheds light on the motives of military authorities in arresting Palestinian journalists. The case also provides disturbing evidence of two other pervasive human rights violations in the West Bank and Gaza Strip: the mistreatment of detainees during interrogation, and the propensity of military judges to refuse bail to suspects in what are deemed to be security cases, regardless of the circumstances of the case." He was released on bail in March 1991, after thirty-eight days incarceration. Several days following his release, the Israeli military formally charged him with several offences, including failing to provide the military with his sources, giving the publicly listed Reuters phone number to Hamas, and illegally possessing and using a fax machine. The charges were later dropped and his bail refunded.

In December 1992, Shriteh was again arrested by the Israeli military, and considered for inclusion in the mass deportation of Hamas members to Lebanon. He was, however, instead released, with Shin Bet saying that he had been initially included in the deportation list by accident. He was subsequently arrested again in February 1993, along with cameraman Marwan al-Ghoul, while covering a protest against deportations in Gaza City, with the military accusing him of failing to leave a closed military zone. He was released after one day.

In 1995, a travel ban was imposed on Shriteh, preventing him from leaving the Gaza Strip, and his wife, who was originally from Jerusalem, was forced to regularly apply for permits to be allowed to stay with him in Gaza. In August 1998, the Israeli government announced that it would drop its international travel ban on Shriteh, although still banning him from travelling into Israel.

In 2000, he moved to the United States. In the United States he has served as the "family patriarch" of a set of businesses based in Punta Gorda, Florida, described in 2025 as "among Punta Gorda's largest private employers". They include the King of Vape chain of vape shops and real-estate development.

== Awards and recognition ==
In 1993, he was awarded the John R. Aubuchon Award by the American National Press Club Journalism Institute "for his coverage of turbulence in the Gaza Strip in the face of harassment by Israeli authorities."
