= Kakavadzor, Aragatsotn =

Kakavadzor Կաքավաձոր
- Location within Armenia Location within Aragatsotn
- Coordinates: 40°20′37″N 44°00′43″E
- Country: Armenia
- Province: Aragatsotn
- Municipality: Talin

Population (2011)
  - Total: 981
- Time zone: UTC+4
  - Summer (DST): UTC+5

Kakavadzor (Armenian: Կաքավաձոր) is a village in the Talin Municipality of the Aragatsotn Province of Armenia.
