= Assad Saftawi =

Palestinian educator and Fatah leader (1935–1993)

- Born: 14 June 1935; Al Majdal, Mandatory Palestine
- Died: 21 October 1993 (aged 58); Gaza Strip, Palestine
- Cause of death: Assassination
- Burial place: Gaza City, Palestine
- Years active: 1950s–1993
- Movement: Fatah

Assad Saftawi (1935–1993) was a Palestinian cofounder and leader of the Fatah movement who was shot to death by three masked hitmen in the Gaza Strip on 21 October 1993. The assassination remains unsolved.

== Early life and education ==
Saftawi was born in Al Majdal on 14 June 1935. His family left the city during the Nakba in 1948 and settled in Gaza. He attended the Teachers' Training College in Cairo between 1954 and 1957 and obtained a degree in teaching.

During his studies in Cairo Saftawi became a member of the Egyptian Muslim Brotherhood and met Salah Khalaf. He was part of the Gaza branch in the group which also included Khalaf, Fathi Balawi, Khalil Al Wazir, Youssef Al Najjar and Kamal Adwan. Saftawi later left the Muslim Brotherhood and was involved in the establishment of the Fatah movement along with Khalaf and Yasser Arafat.

Saftawi was expelled from Egypt due to his Brotherhood membership in 1957. He was put under house arrest by the Egyptian government in Gaza until 1967.

== Career and activities ==
Following his release from house arrest Saftawi worked as a teacher in the Gaza Strip and began to work as a head teacher in UNRWA schools in Al Shati in 1970. He was detained by Israel in 1973 for his Fatah membership and was released after five years. Later, he was arrested again several times, including his detention without formal charges for three months in 1988 during the first Intifada. He was the headmaster of an UNRWA school in Burj refuge camp.

Saftawi headed the Fatah group in the Gaza Strip. He was a candidate for the presidency of the Red Crescent in Gaza in December 1979. He lost the election against Abdel Shafe. Saftawi developed a 11-point peace proposal in 1989 which he presented in Cairo. He managed to visit the city when the Israeli government lifted the travel restrictions on him.

=== Views ===
Throughout his career in Fatah Saftawi was close to Salah Khalaf. However, Khalaf opposed his peace proposal in 1989. Saftawi was a moderate member of the Fatah and was a negotiator between the Islamic and nationalist movements of the Palestinian resistance. He openly supported a peaceful solution to the Israeli–Palestinian conflict and the peace agreement with Israel signed in Washington, D.C. on 13 September 1993.

For Saftawi majority of the people living in Gaza preferred an active resistance as a response to the Israeli occupation and therefore, became supporters of the Palestinian Islamic Jihad instead of the Muslim Brotherhood. He also argued that the Islamic resistance movements were actively supported by the Israeli authorities from the early 1970s to reduce the Palestinian people's backing of the nationalist movements.

== Assassination ==
Saftawi escaped unhurt an assassination attempt in July 1992. He was assassinated in the Gaza Strip on 21 October 1993 while picking up his 12-year-old son from a school. He succumbed to the wounds at a hospital. He was 58 years old. The perpetrators of the assassination remain unknown.

Saftawi was the third Palestinian killed who advocated the peace treaty with Israel in September 1993. The other two were Mohammed Abu Shaaban and Maher Khail.

A group led by Ahmed Jibril and sponsored by Syria claimed responsibility for the assassination of Saftawi calling to a Western news agency. Nabil Shaath, a Palestine Liberation Organization (PLO) member, reported that the murderers of Saftawi were from the PLO factions. However, Yasser Arafat claimed that he and others were killed by the Israeli agents.

After a funeral ceremony Saftawi buried in Gaza City.

== Personal life ==
Saftawi was married. His family lived in Beit Lahia. His son, Imad, was a former member of the Palestinian Islamic Jihad.
