= FlySur =

Spanish airline

FlySur (TAER Andalus)
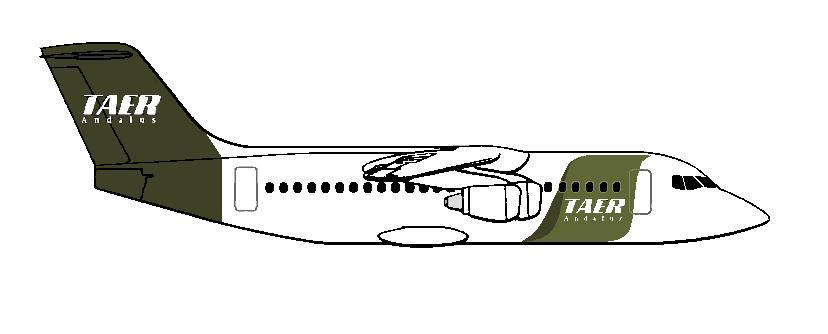
IATA	ICAO	Call sign
-	-	-
- Founded: 2007
- Ceased operations: 2008
- Operating bases: Córdoba Airport
- Fleet size: 1
- Parent company: PAN Air
- Headquarters: Córdoba, Spain
- Website: http://www.flysur.com/

FlySur was an airline based in Córdoba, Spain. Unable to overcome its financial difficulties the company ceased operations shortly after having begun.

== History ==
FlySur was initially known as TAER Andalus. The airline was created by the cargo airline PAN Air as well as private investors in 2007. TAER Andalus expected to introduce flights from Córdoba in the spring of 2008, but the airline was able to launch operations only on 4 September.

Shortly before beginning to operate in September 2008, TAER Andalus changed its name to FlySur. However, very soon the company had to face low bookings and problems at Córdoba Airport owing to adverse weather. Strong winds made landing often hazardous which forced to cancel some flights and to divert others to Seville Airport. Finally all flights were suspended after 20 October 2008. Unable to find a managing partner the company ceased operations in October 2008 and was liquidated on 26 May 2009.

== Destinations ==
- Spain
  - Barcelona (Barcelona International Airport)
  - Bilbao (Bilbao Airport)
  - Córdoba (Córdoba Airport), hub of the airline
  - Vigo (Vigo-Peinador Airport)

The projected destinations were the following:

- Morocco
  - Casablanca (Mohammed V International Airport)
- Portugal
  - Lisbon (Lisbon Airport)
- Spain
  - Ibiza (Ibiza Airport)
  - Santiago de Compostela (Santiago de Compostela Airport)
  - Tenerife (Tenerife South Airport)
  - Valencia (Valencia Airport)

== Fleet ==
The FlySur fleet included the following aircraft (as of 21 September 2008):

- 1 ATR 42-300 (operated by Top Fly)

The projected fleet was:

- 2 BAe 146-300
