= Abdourahamane Soli =

Nigerien lawyer, politician and author

- Born: Niger
- Died: 18 February 2016; Niamey
- Citizenship: Nigerien
- Education: University of Dakar
- Occupation: Lawyer Author Politician

Abdourahamane Soli (1938 – 18 February 2016) was a Nigerien born in Tahoua. He was a lawyer, politician, and author.

== Life ==
Abdourahamane Soli attended primary school in his hometown of Tahoua and secondary school in Niamey and Porto-Novo, from which he earned a baccalaureate degree. He completed his military service with the French Armed Forces in Ouidah. Between 1958 and 1962, he studied at the University of Dakar and earned a master's degree in private law. From 1962 to 1966, he pursued further legal studies at the Centre national d'études judiciaires in Bordeaux.

Soli began his career in the Nigerien civil service. A severe visual impairment did not prevent him from being present in public through numerous lectures and publications as a writer. He became Minister of Justice in 1987, during the Second Republic under President Ali Saïbou. Soli then became Attorney General of the Supreme Court. Soli is known for his achievements as a public prosecutor against the prominent French lawyer Jacques Vergès, whom President Mahamane Ousmane had hired to challenge the legality of the special constituencies in the 1995 parliamentary elections before the Supreme Court.

Soli retired as Attorney General in 1998. His focus continued to speak out publicly on legal and political issues, including opposing President Mamadou Tandja's attempt to win a third term in 2009, which was not provided for by the constitution. After Tandja's overthrow, he served as Vice President of the Transitional Constitutional Court in 2010.

Soli died in 2016 in a fire in his apartment in Niamey. Niger's first school for the blind and visually impaired, founded in 1979, was named after him.

== Works ==
- The tax god: play in three acts. 1973
- Twelve Short Stories from Niger. 1988
- The pilgrim's path

== Literature ==
- Littérature du Niger. Rencontre (in French). Vol. II: Barkiré Alidou, Marcel Inné, Hima Adamou, Djibo Mayaki, Alhassane Danté, Soli Abdourhamane, Amadou Ousmane, Albert Issa, Boubé Zoumé, Idé Adamou. L'Harmattan, Paris 2010. L’Harmattan. 2010. pp. 71–84. ISBN 978-2-296-12859-0.
