= Tahir Pervez =

Pakistani footballer (born 1963)

Personal information
- Full name: Tahir Pervez Qureshi
- Date of birth: 8 September 1963 (age 63)
- Place of birth: Rawalpindi, Pakistan
- Position: Defender

Senior career*
Years	Team	Apps	(Gls)
- WAPDA

International career
1989–1993	Pakistan	5	(0)
- * Club domestic league appearances and goals

Tahir Pervez Qureshi (Urdu: طاہر پرویز قریشی; born 8 September 1963) is a Pakistani former footballer who played as a defender. He represented the Pakistan national team from 1989 till 1993.

== Career ==
=== Club career ===
Pervez represented WAPDA at the National Football Championship. He featured at the 1991 Asian Club Championship with the team against Dhaka Mohammedan.

=== International career ===
Pervez featured at the 1990 FIFA World Cup qualification in the country's first participation in the tournament. He featured in Pakistan's second participation at the 1994 FIFA World Cup qualification in 1993, playing as a regular starter where Pakistan again ended up unsuccessful.

=== Refereeing career ===
After retirement as player, Pervez served as referee in domestic football including in the Pakistan Premier League.

== Personal life ==
Pervez's son Muhammad Abdullah has represented Pakistan at the youth level, and was top scorer at the 2025 SAFF U-17 Championship.
