= Tahar Douis =

Moroccan wrestler of alligators

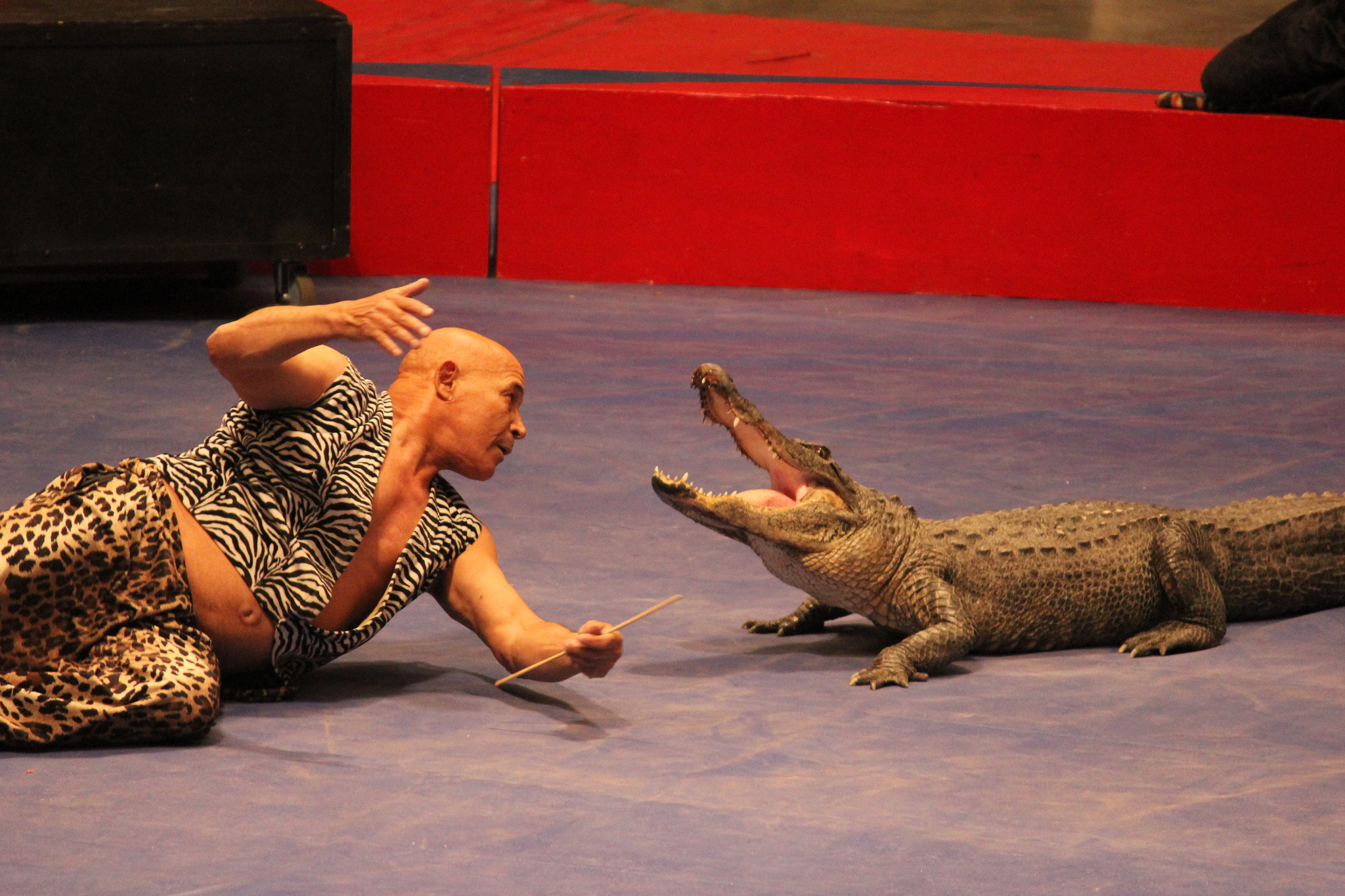
Tahar Douis performing at the Omaha Civic Auditorium with the Shrine Circus.

Tahar Douis (born 1950s) is a Moroccan wrestler of alligators known for hypnotizing them and putting his head inside their open jaws.

== Life ==
Douis was born in the 1950s in Marrakesh, left home at age 6 to join a group of street performers, and later began performing for the London-based Circus Hasani at age 16. In the 1980s he was taught by Bob Tiger, a great third-generation Seminole gator wrestler from the Florida Everglades. Previous to his career as an alligator wrestler, he was a snake charmer and circus strong man. As a strong man, he earned a Guinness World Record in the 1970s by carrying 12 men weighing a total of 1,700 pounds on his shoulders, forming the world's heaviest human pyramid. In the late 1980s his alligator show was a star attraction in the Ringling Bros. and Barnum & Bailey Circus as part of their "Safari Fantasy" themed shows. By the middle of the 1990s he was wrestling gators as part of the "Splash" show at the Riviera in Winchester, Nevada on the Las Vegas Strip.

Tahar is known by many names, including "The Moroccan Master", "The Alligator King", "Master of the Jaws of Death", and "Black Tarzan." Among the many gators he has wrestled in his career have been such scaly opponents as Jumpy, Bubba, and Suitcase. The venues he has wrestled his gators in have included the "Water Chamber of Doom."

Tahar's striking good looks and clean-shaven head have drawn comparisons to the late Yul Brynner as portrayed in the King of Siam. His broad-shouldered, muscular body has also been compared to that of a Chippendales dancer. A career wrestling gators has left several scars on his body, including one on his head from a match against the 8-foot-long (2.4 m) Jumpy, one of the meanest of Tahar's alligators who hisses like a snake.

Tahar has a warning for others regarding the extreme dangers of gator wrestling; "If your mind is not with the alligator, that's the time he can get you ... When he bites, he won't let go until he gets what he wants. Then the animal starts to twist and nothing can stop him — except death." When not on tour with his alligators, Tahar lives on a ranch in Texas with over fifty alligators, his wife and two daughters.
