= Voskevaz =

Voskevaz Ոսկեվազ
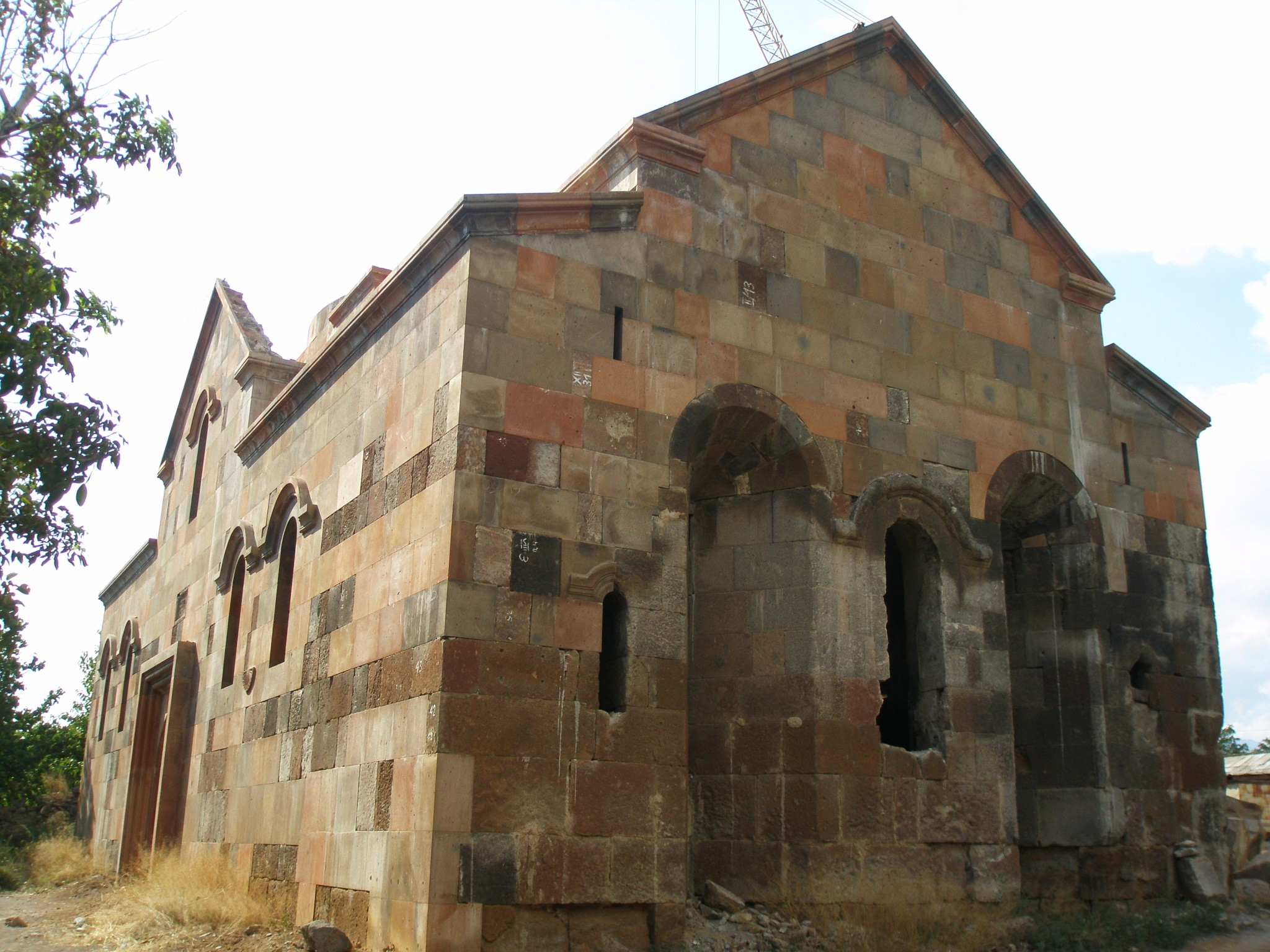
- Voskevaz Church

- Location within Armenia Location within Aragatsotn
- Coordinates: 40°16′33″N 44°17′50″E
- Country: Armenia
- Province: Aragatsotn
- Municipality: Ashtarak
- Elevation: 1,030 m (3,380 ft)

Population (2011)
  - Total: 4,168
- Time zone: UTC+4
  - Summer (DST): UTC+5

Voskevaz (Armenian: Ոսկեվազ) is a village in the Ashtarak Municipality of the Aragatsotn Province of Armenia. Not far from the center of the village is the church of Surp Hovhannes, built between the 7th and 12th centuries. The village is home to the Hayasy brewery.
