= Tahirou Amadou =

Nigerien Politician

Minister of Justice of Niger
- In office 5 October 1994 – 25 February 1995

Personal details
- Occupation: Politician

Tahirou Amadou is a Nigerien politician who served as Minister of Justice (Keeper of the Seals) under the presidency of Mahamane Ousmane during the Third Republic. He held office from 5 October 1994 to 25 February 1995.

== Career ==
Tahirou Amadou was appointed Minister of Justice following Kandine Mallam Adam, taking office on 5 October 1994 as part of the transitional government in place during the Third Republic. He served until 25 February 1995, when Ibrahim Beidou succeeded him.

== See also ==
- Ministry of Justice (Niger)
- Politics of Niger
