= Tairov =

Tairov Թաիրով
- Location within Armenia
- Coordinates: 40°09′41″N 44°25′20″E
- Country: Armenia
- Province: Armavir
- Founded: 1921

Population (2011)
  - Total: 2,377

Tairov (Armenian: Թաիրով), is a village in the Armavir Province of Armenia. Administratively it is subordinate to the community of Parakar and is located 1km east to Parakar. Tairov was founded in 1921.

== See also ==
- Armavir Province
