= Krasnogorsky Zavod =

Russian engineering company

Public Joint Stock Company «Krasnogorsky Zavod»
- Company type: PJSC
- Industry: Optical engineering, optoelectronics
- Founded: Krasnogorsk, Russia (1942)
- Headquarters: Krasnogorsk, Moscow Oblast, Russia
- Key people: Alexander Novikov (director)
- Products: Cameras, night vision devices, rangefinders, military optics
- Parent: Shvabe (Rostec)
- Website: Official page at Shvabe site

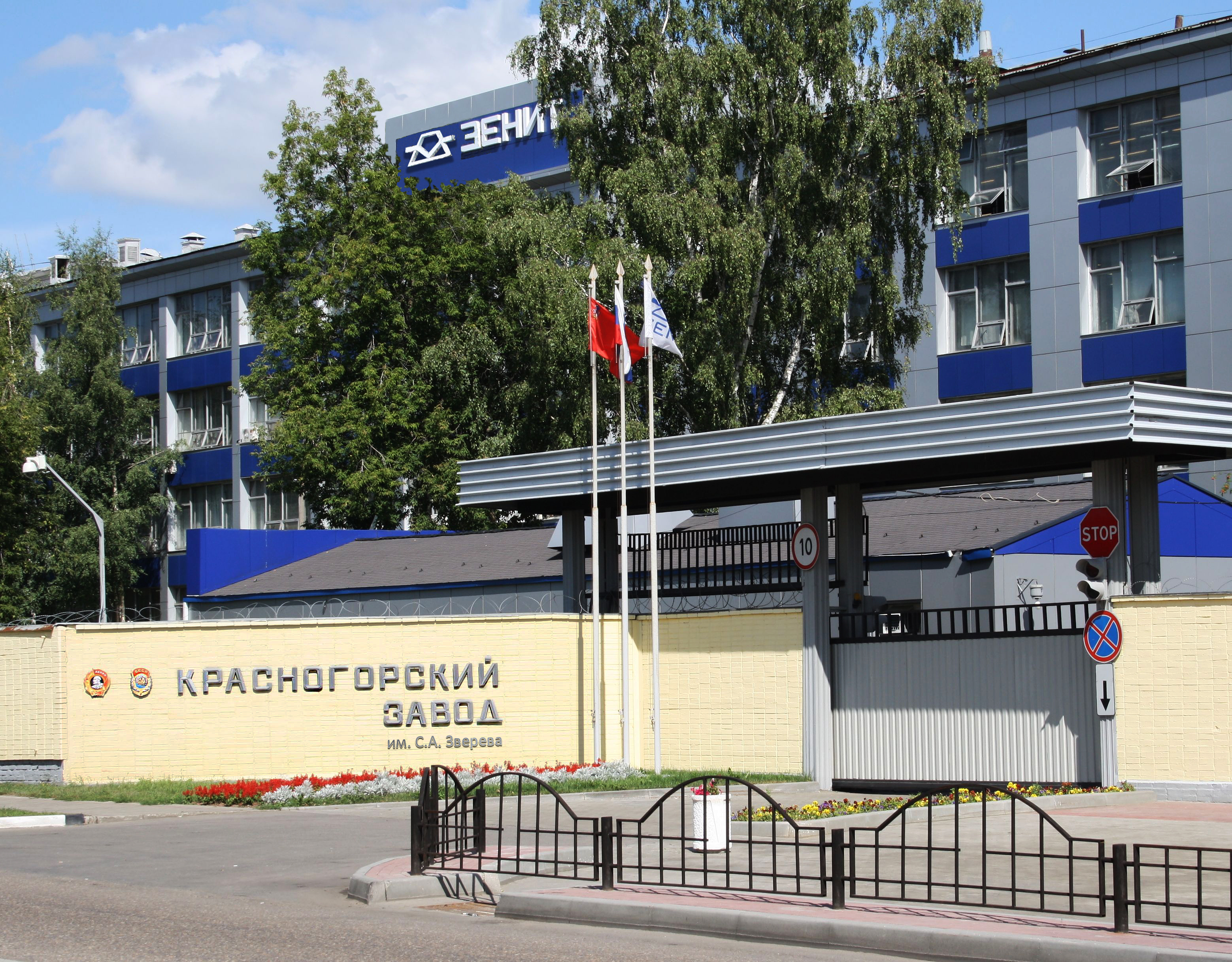
Krasnogorsky Zavod main building

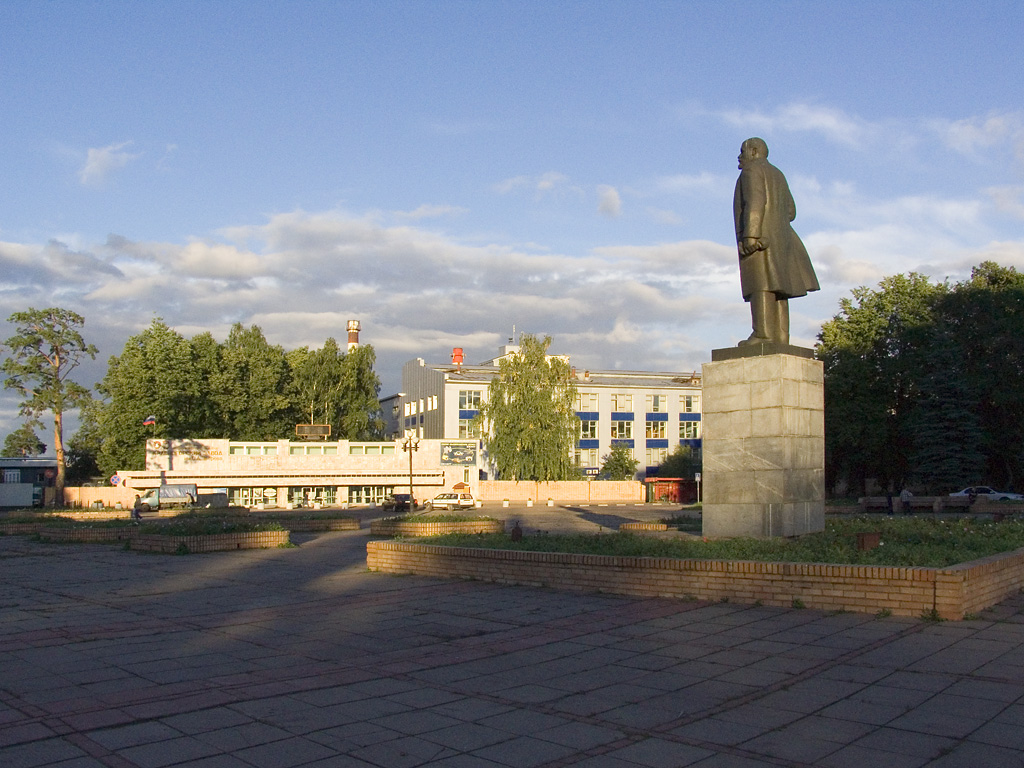
Opticians' Square in Krasnogorsk, with KMZ buildings in the background

Krasnogorsky zavod (Russian: Красногорский завод им. С. А. Зверева, lit. 'Krasnogorsk Works named after S. A. Zverev') is a Russian factory in Krasnogorsk near Moscow which specializes in optical technology. Part of Shvabe Holding (Rostec state corporation).

During the Soviet period it was called Krasnogorsk Mechanical Works (Красногорский механический завод, Krasnogorskiy Mekhanicheskiy Zavod). The abbreviation KMZ (КМЗ) is still in common use.

== Products ==
KMZ is known largely for its photographic and movie cameras of the Zorki, Zenit and Krasnogorsk series, several million of which were produced. It also has a large military optics and mechanical engineering division.

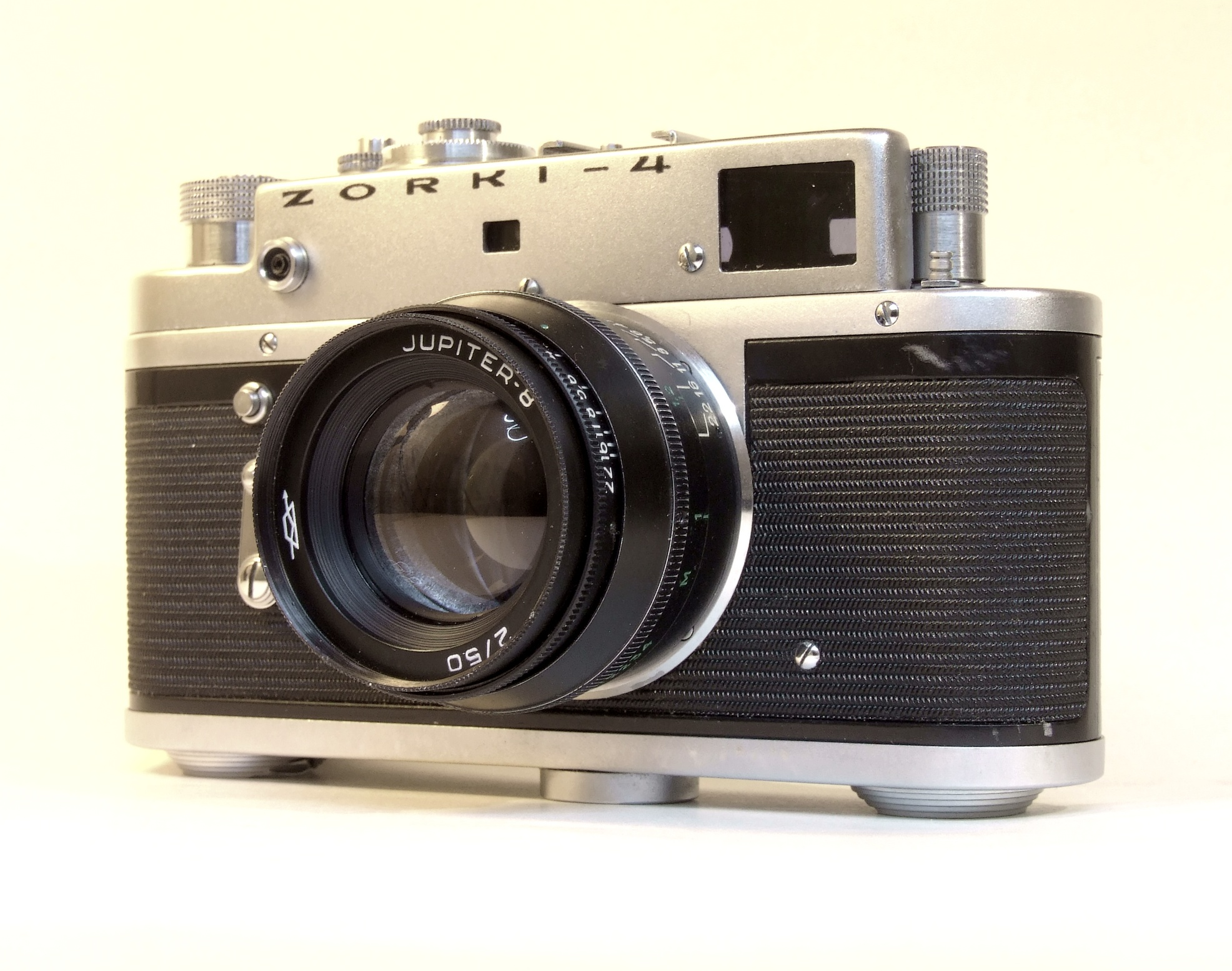
Zorki 4 rangefinder camera

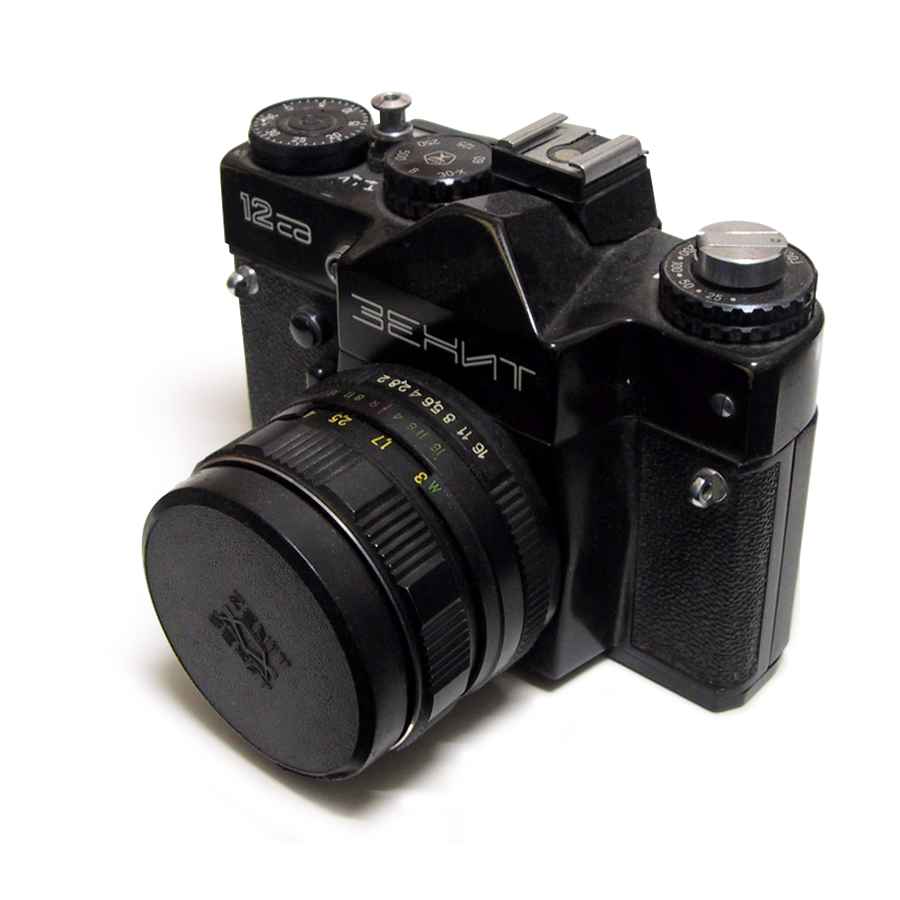
Zenit 12 SLR camera

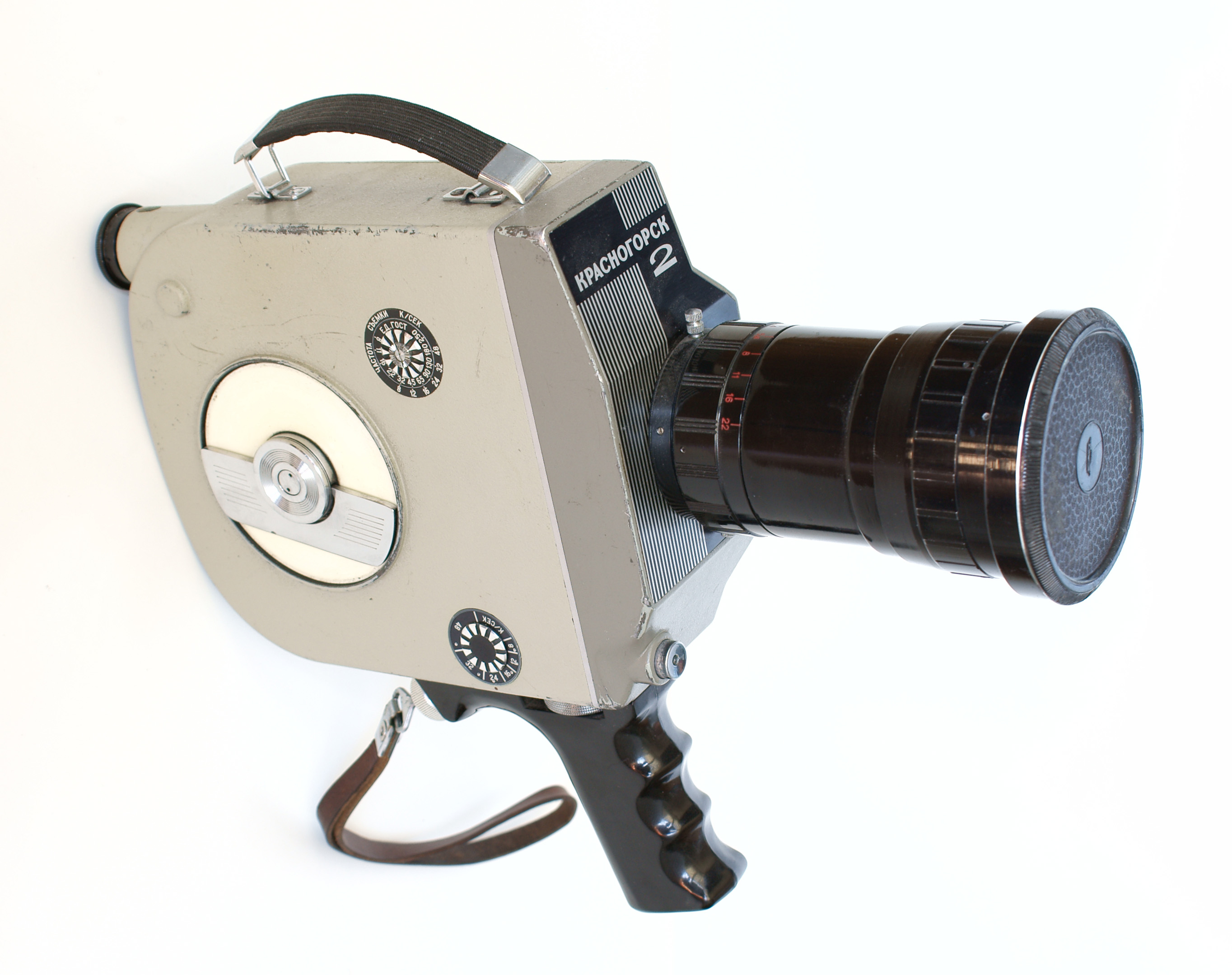
Krasnogorsk-2 movie camera

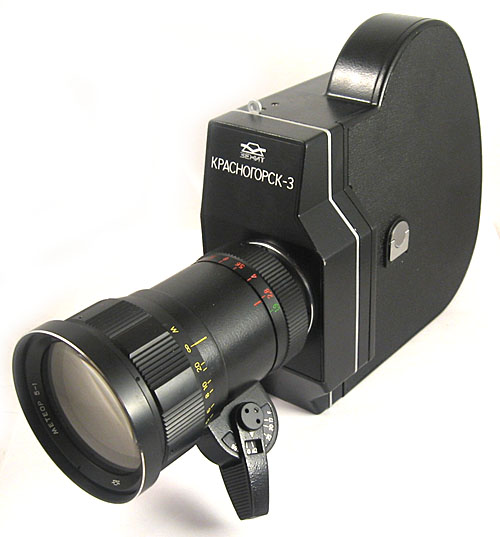
Krasnogorsk-3 movie camera

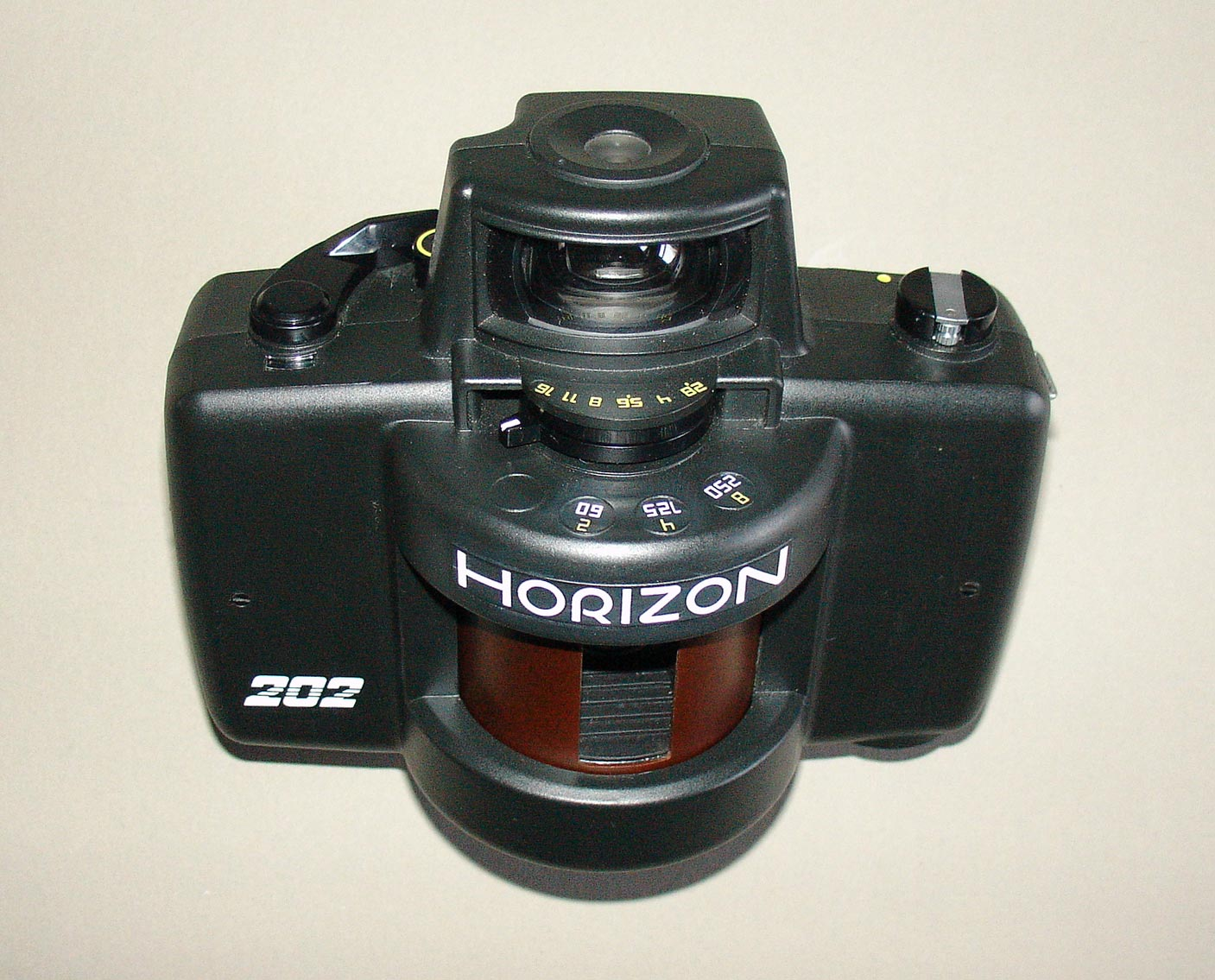
Horizon 202 panoramic camera

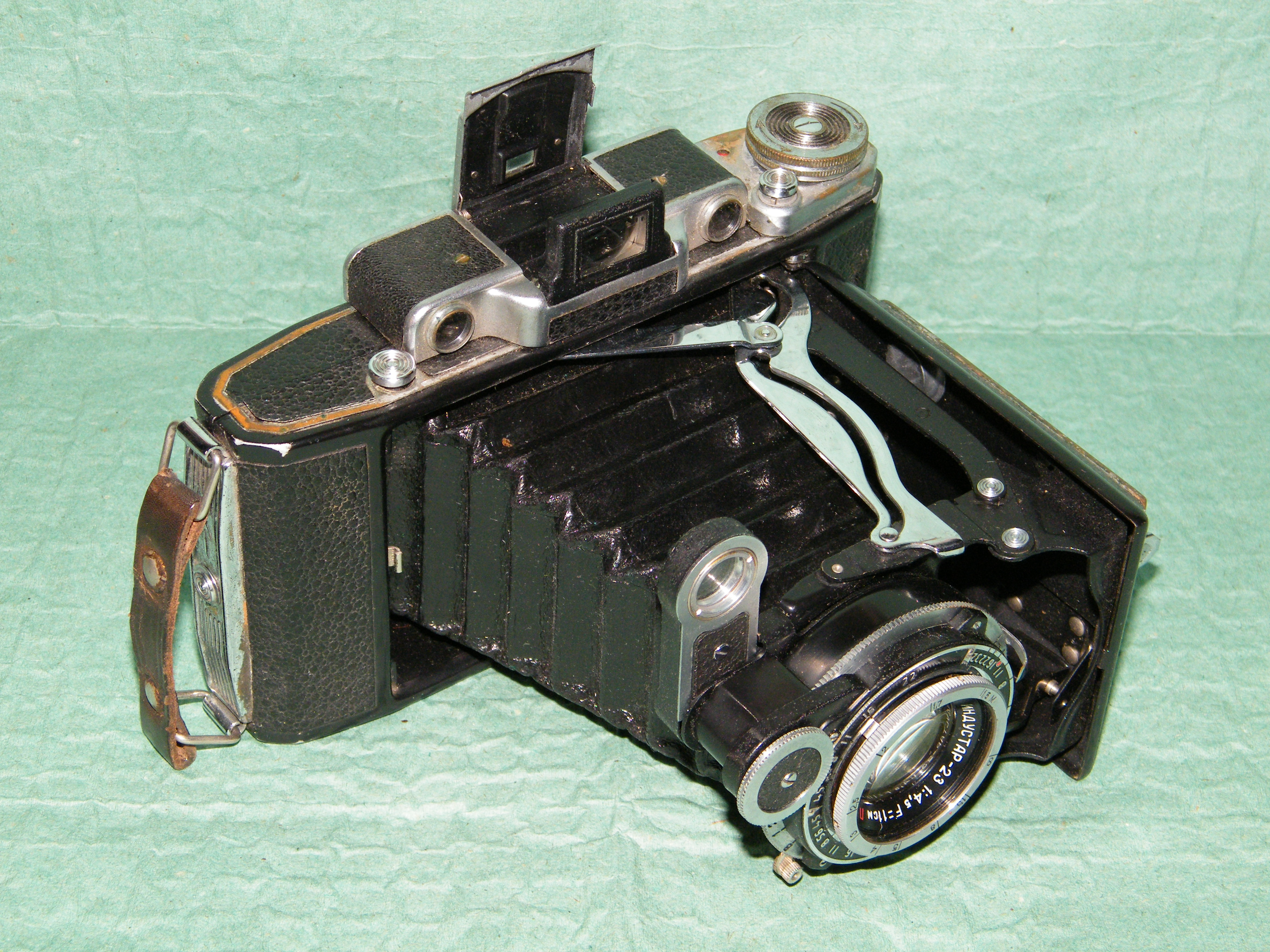
Moskva 2 camera

== History ==
=== Founding and post-war years ===
After the German invasion of the Soviet Union in World War II, the Red Army had acute need for precision optical instruments. The existing factories were either inaccessible, such as LOMO in besieged Leningrad, or overloaded with demand, such as FED which had just been evacuated from Kharkiv to Berdsk. The KMZ factory was set up in 1942 near Moscow, which by then was no longer in immediate danger from German troops, on the site of a recently evacuated mechanical plant. Initially the company took over production of scopes and binoculars as well as reconnaissance cameras.

After the end of the war, KMZ began producing photographic lenses in 1945 to the specifications of the Carl Zeiss corporation, whose factory in Jena had been overrun by the Red Army and largely carted off as war reparations.

=== 1950s and 1960s: Years of creativity ===
The mid-1950s saw the beginning of a period of heightened R&D activity at KMZ.

During this period, KMZ also produced the world's first subminiature SLR camera, the Narciss, an all-metal camera using 16mm unperforated film in special cassette, frame size 14x21mm. Narciss has a focal plane shutter, speed B,1/2,1/5,1/10,1/25,1/50,1/125,1/250 and 1/500 sec.

=== 1970s and 1980s: Catering to the domestic market ===
The pace of R&D for consumer products at KMZ substantially slowed down at the end of the 1960s. During the 1970s consumer production at KMZ shifted towards producing large numbers of individual, relatively simple models of the existing product lines.

=== Since the 1990s: Collapse and reconstruction ===
After the collapse of the Soviet Union, KMZ production was largely in disarray. Now, it is a group member of the multi-national Russian Shvabe Holding.

== Operation ==
The activities of PJSC NKMZ include

- surveillance and sighting aircraft systems;
- fire control systems for armored vehicles;
- means of space control;
- Earth remote sensing systems from space and from air carriers;
- laser rangefinders-designators, all-day surveillance systems, sights for small arms (for example, the Hyperon series);
- optical-electronic equipment, civil, scientific equipment;
- medical devices in the following areas: gynecology, proctology, ophthalmology, endoprosthetics;
- photo equipment;
- observation devices.
- scientific instrumentation: scientific and analytical equipment for conducting fundamental research, creating high technologies, new defense equipment, solving economic problems in various fields of science, technology and production;
- calculation and design of optical systems, lens engineering.

PJSC KMZ also carries out measures for the repair of military equipment, warranty and author's supervision of its condition, implements proposals in the field of military-technical cooperation of the Russian Federation with foreign states in accordance with international treaties of the Russian Federation.

== Directors ==
Since its establishment as Precision Mechanics Plant No.19:

- Dobrodomov Vladimir Mikhailovich (1927-1928)
- Titov Ignat Titovich (1928-1937)
- Gabriel Romanovich Kantar (1937-1938)
- Kizimov V.F. (1938)
- Pavel Vasilyevich Bystrov (1938)
- Uvarov Ivan Alexandrovich (1939-1940)
- Leonty Nikolaevich Rykunin (1941)
- Kotlyar Alexandr Savelyevich (1941)

Since its transformation into the State Union Plant No.393 of the NKVD of the USSR and further:

- Kolychev Vladimir Alexandrovich (1942-1946) — the first director of KMZ since its foundation.
- Skarzhinsky Dmitry Frantsevich (1946-1950)
- Solovyov Andrey Fedorovich (1950-1952)
- Egorov Nikolai Mikhailovich (1953-1965)
- Voronin Lev Alekseevich (1965-1968)
- Kreopalov Vladislav Ivanovich (1968-1973)
- Ustinov Oleg Mikhailovich (1973-1975)
- Trifonov Vilor Grigorievich (1975-1986)
- Goev Alexander Ivanovich (1986-2006)
- Zhigulich Valery Petrovich (2006-2011)
- Tarasov Alexander Petrovich (2011-2014)[16]
- Patrikeev Alexey Pavlovich (2014-2016)
- Kalyugin Vadim Stanislavovich (from January 12, 2016 to October 28, 2019)
- Novikov Alexander V. (from October 28, 2019 to October 16, 2023)
- Interim CEO Kuznetsov Evgeny A., (from October 17, 2023 to the present)

== Logo ==
Before 1949 the KMZ logo was a simple dove prism, nicknamed "tomb" by factory workers. In 1949 the logo was changed to the present form, depicting a prism with a refracted ray of light.

== Select bibliography ==
- Princelle, Jean-Loup (2004). The Authentic Guide to Russian and Soviet Cameras. Ondreville-sur-Essonne: Le Rêve. pp. esp. pp. 120–125. ISBN 2-9522521-1-4.
