= Zorki 4 =

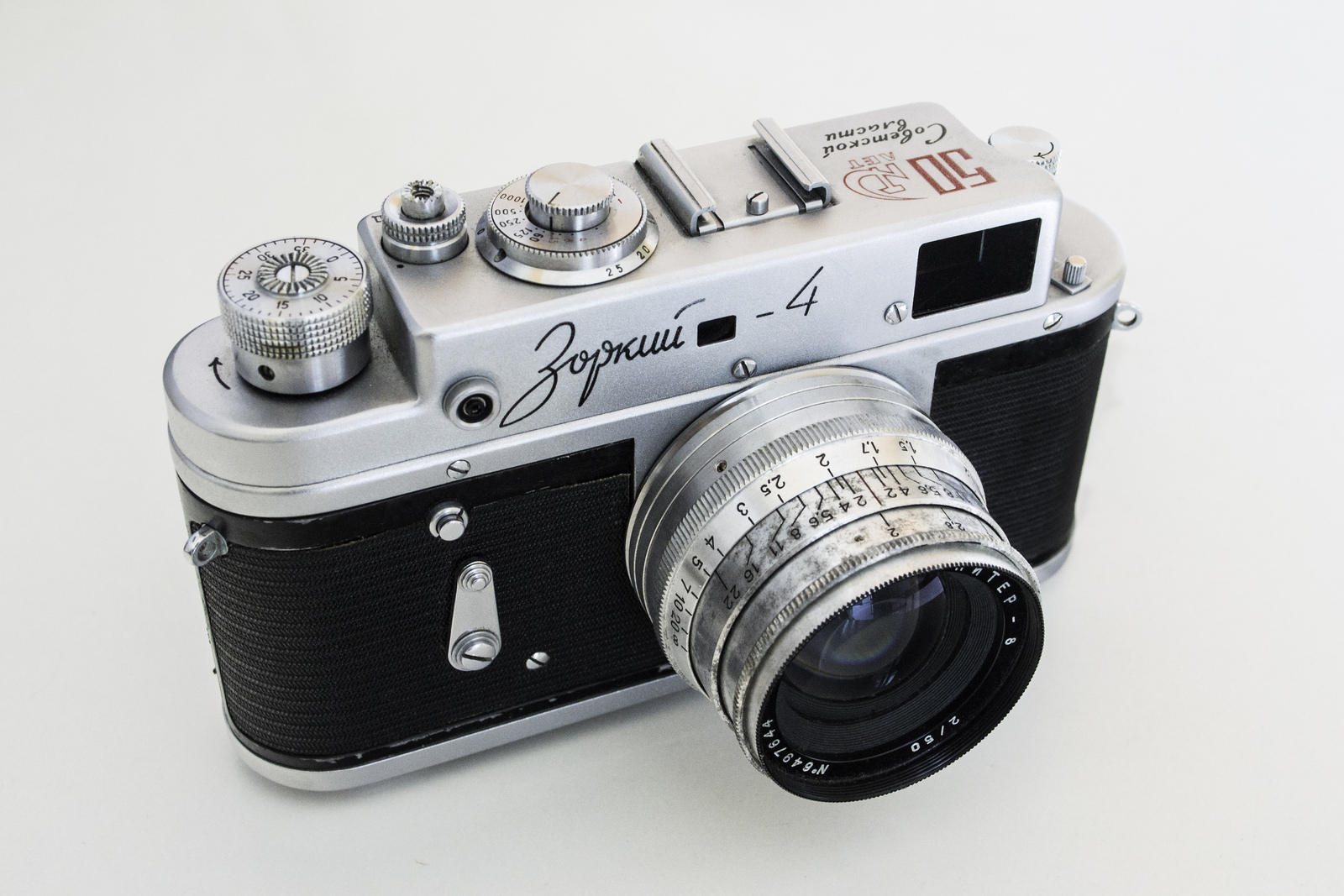

Overview
- Maker: Krasnogorskiy Zavod
- Type: 35 mm rangefinder camera

Lens
- Lens mount: 39LTM

Focusing
- Focus: Manual

Exposure/metering
- Exposure: Manual

Flash
- Flash: Flash sync 1/30s

The Zorki 4 was possibly the most popular of all Zorki cameras, with 1,715,677 cameras made by the KMZ factory in Krasnogorsk, Russia. The Zorki 4 was also the first of the Zorki cameras to be exported in large numbers to the west. It is a fully manual camera, and does not have a lightmeter. An additional lightmeter may be added by the cold shoe.

When the Zorki 4 rangefinder was introduced in 1956, its contemporaries included the Zorki S, Zorki 2S, FED 2b, Leica M3 (introduced two years before), Leica IIIg, Nikon S2, Canon VT, and Canon L1. The Zorki 4's production run outlasted all of them. When it morphed into the Zorki 4K by 1973, its contemporaries included the FED 4b, Leica M4 and M5, Nikon F2, and Canon F-1 and Canon Canonet QL 17 GIII.

The Zorki 4 is essentially a Zorki 3S with a self timer. It retained all of the features and strong points of the 3S. The early bodies have a vulcanite body covering, engraved shutter speeds, and strap lugs. Later bodies have fabric covering and the shutter speeds (1/60 and 1/30 instead of 1/50 and 1/25) are silk-screened. By the mid-1960s, the strap lugs had disappeared.

== Variants ==
The Zorki 4 came in 2 variants:

- the original, which uses a thumb wheel to advance the film and cock the shutter,
- the Zorki 4k included a wind lever for easier operation.

== Operation ==
As with other Soviet-era rangefinders, the shutter speed selector rotates when the shutter is released, and should not be changed until after the shutter has been cocked. If the shutter speed is changed without cocking the shutter first, the setting pin can be broken when the film is advanced.
