= Krasnogorsk (camera) =

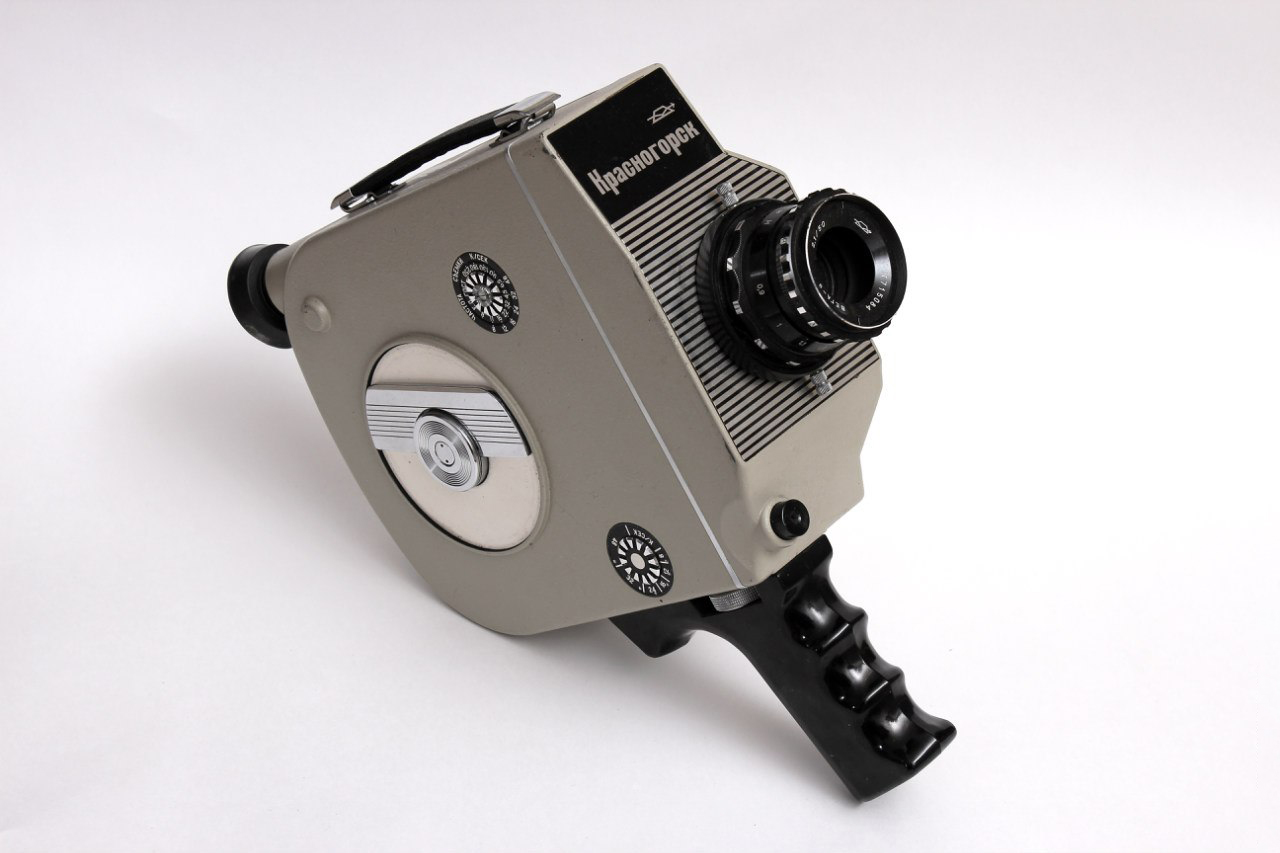

Overview
- Type: Single-lens reflex
- Released: 1966

Lens
- Lens mount: Russian bayonette mount

Sensor/medium
- Film format: 16 mm film

Shutter
- Frame rate: 8fps-48fps
- Shutter: Mechanical
- Shutter speeds: 1/20s (8fps) to 1/120 (48fps)

Krasnogorsk (Красногорск) is a series of amateur cameras, consisting of spring-wound 16mm mirror-reflex movie camera designed and manufactured in the Soviet Union by Krasnogorsk Mechanical Works (KMZ), produced between 1966 and 1993. This line of cameras originated from those designed for the Zond and Salyut space programs in the Soviet Union, but were later developed for consumer, amateur use. The cameras were popular among amateur filmmakers in Eastern Europe, and later in western film schools.

This series of cameras made use of single-lens reflex viewfinders via a mirrored shutter, allowing the operator to see the exact image being photographed without parallax distortion. Early models used film cartridges, but with the Krasnogorsk-3, the change was made to rolls of film. All of the models have built in light meters, variable frame rate, and spring-wound motors. A Krasnogorsk-4 was briefly manufactured, but was quickly discontinued in favor of its predecessor, the Krasnogorsk-3.

== Krasnogorsk ==
The Krasnogorsk (Krasnogorsk-1, or K1) was a camera developed in the Soviet Union during the 1960s. Initially developed for the Zond program of lunar spaceflight, it was later developed into an amateur movie camera. The non-consumer model had a two-lens turret and electronic motor for film advancement. The viewfinder in that model was a twin-lens reflex and created parallax.

Krasnogorsk-2
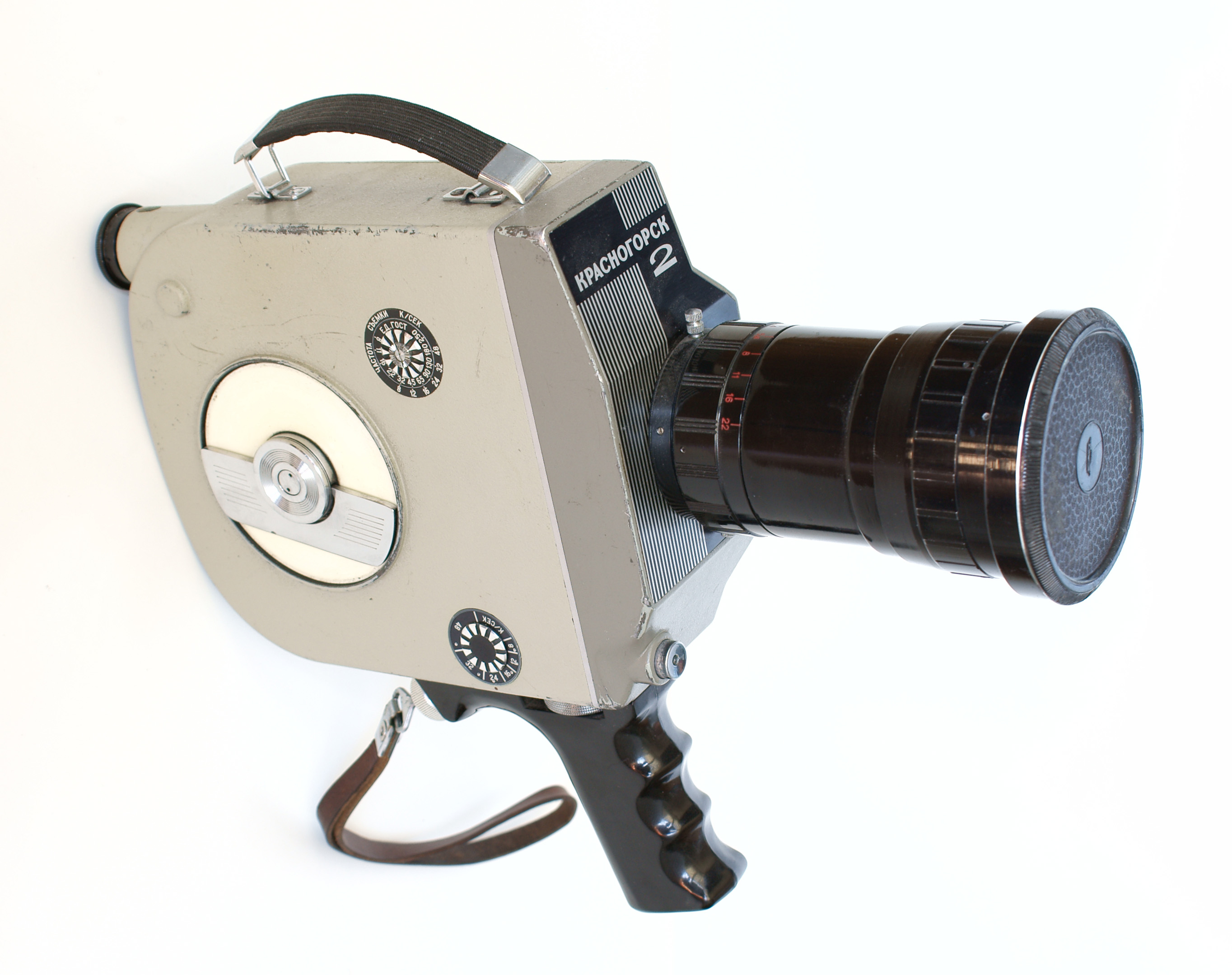

Overview
- Type: Single-lens reflex
- Released: 1966

Lens
- Lens mount: M42 lens mount or Russian bayonette mount
- Lens: Meteor-5-1 f/1.9 17–69mm (standard lens)

Sensor/medium
- Film format: 16 mm film

Shutter
- Frame rate: 8fps-48fps
- Shutter: Mechanical
- Shutter speeds: 1/19s (8fps) to 1/116 (48fps)

General
- Dimensions: 326x104x194 mm (12.8x4x7.6 in)
- Weight: 3.2 kg (7lbs) (body and lens)

Production began on the consumer camera in 1965. When it went to consumer markets in 1966, it had undergone many design changes, including a single lens mounted via a bayonet lens mount (rather than a turret system), a single-lens reflex camera viewfinder via a mirrored shutter, and a spring-wound motor. A total of 36,683 K1 cameras were made. This camera did not take rolls of 16mm, but instead used preloaded cartridges. The cartridges can be opened and reloaded. Frame rate is controlled by a variable dial that turns from 8fps to 48fps. If the dial is set below 8fps, the motor will not run. The internal light meter uses a mercury battery which is no longer manufactured.

== Krasnogorsk-2 ==
The Krasnogorsk-2 (or commonly K2) is 16mm spring-wound film camera with a mirror shutter, produced by Krasnogorsky Zavod from 1966 to 1977. It was released in the same year as the Krasnogorsk-1, and production was discontinued in 1977 when the Krasnogorsk-3 was released. Between 1966 and 1977 a total of 15,081 Krasnogorsk-2 cameras were produced.

=== Technical information ===
The film is moved by a spring drive using a single registration pin, which allows both double and single-perforated film. The camera can record up to 30 seconds of film per wind-up. This camera had an internal cassette in the magazine, which could fit 100ft (30 meters) of a 16mm film spools. This way the film could be loaded into the camera without risking light leaks. Although some K2 cameras have been modified for extended magazines and to hold roll film. The frame rate can be adjusted via a dial on the side, and can be adjusted between 8fps to 48 fps. The camera also has a single frame mode, using a flexible trigger cable at the rear side of the camera.

The camera could be attached to a tripod using a standard 3/8 "screw or to a pistol grip with a shoulder rest for handheld shooting. The camera weighs 6.7lbs (3kg) without accessories. A cable release may be connected into the back of the camera body for animation and other single-frame applications, or into the trigger on the camera's front for remote exposure of the film at frame rate speed. A mirrored butterfly two-bladed shutter opens at 150° (2 × 75°) and provides a single-lens reflex view free of parallax. The viewfinder also has a built-in lightmeter, which gives an approximate light measuring of the whole frame.

Krasnogorsk-3
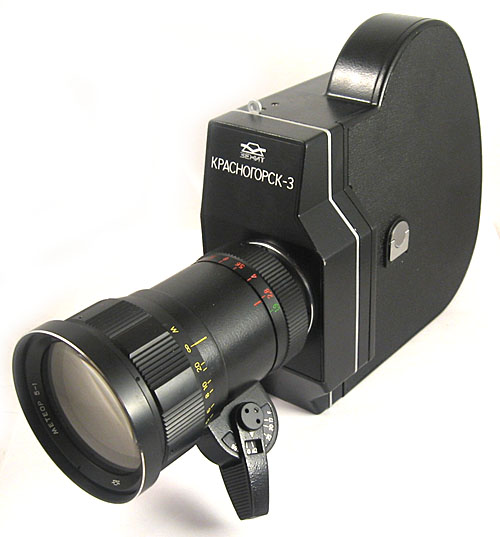

Overview
- Type: Single-lens reflex
- Released: 1971

Lens
- Lens mount: M42 lens mount or Russian bayonette mount
- Lens: Meteor-5-1 f/1.9 17–69mm (standard lens)

Sensor/medium
- Film format: 16 mm film

Shutter
- Frame rate: 8fps-48fps
- Shutter: Mechanical
- Shutter speeds: 1/20s (8fps) to 1/120 (48fps)

General
- Battery: PX640, or zinc-air battery with adapter
- Body features: 3/8 inch thread mount on bottom for tripod or pistol grip
- Dimensions: 8×7.3×3.25 in (203×185×83 mm)
- Weight: 4.5lbs (body only); 6.8lbs (with lens)

References
- http://www.k3camera.com/k3/k3tech.php

== Krasnogorsk-3 ==
The Krasnogorsk-3 (or commonly K3) is a spring-wound 16mm mirror-reflex movie camera designed and manufactured in the Soviet Union by Krasnogorsk Mechanical Works. A total of 105,435 Krasnogorsk-3 cameras were produced between 1971 and 1993. It was one of the most popular 16mm movie cameras in Eastern Europe, where it made a prominent appearance in Krzysztof Kieślowski's 1979 film Camera Buff, and was used in television production. The camera continues to be popular in the West, and has been used in film schools. Director Spike Lee shot parts of his film Get on the Bus with a Krasnogorsk-3.

A total of 27 cameras under the model designation Krasnogorsk-4 were made in 1974 and 1975.

=== Technical information ===
The Krasnogorsk-3 uses standard 100-foot (30 m) load of 16mm film (single or double-perforation), with no provision for an external magazine to extend filming. The single-lens reflex viewfinder uses a mirrored, twin-bladed butterfly shutter designed by Erich Kästner and first used in the Arriflex 35. The mirrored shutter allows the operator to see exactly what is being photographed and to avoid parallax, as would happen in a twin-lens reflex camera.

There are two different lens mounts used on the Krasnogorsk-3: the M42×1 lens mount, and a Russian bayonet mount. The stock lens is the f/1.9 17–69mm zoom lens Meteor-5-1 with a 77mm filter size. The M42 screw-mount allows for the use of widely available lenses from 35mm still cameras such as Asahi Pentax Takumar lenses. With the installation of a wider film gate, the Krasnogorsk-3 image can be widened from the standard 16 mm image to Super 16 film.

The camera has a single pulldown claw and no registration pin. At 24 frames per second, the Krasnogorsk-3 will run for about 25 seconds on a full wind. Film speed is adjustable and variable from 8 fps to 48 fps, and lower and higher frame rates are possible due to the variable knob; however, exact frame rates can be difficult to measure when outside of the standard settings. A cable release may be connected into the back of the camera body for animation and other single-frame applications, or into the trigger on the camera's front for remote exposure of the film at frame rate speed.

The PX640 battery required to power the internal light meter is no longer sold due to its mercury content. Using an alkaline replacement will not give accurate results due to the differing voltage and discharge slope of alkaline cells. However, a zinc–air battery will function properly with an appropriate adapter.
