= FED (camera) =

Soviet camera brand and manufacturer

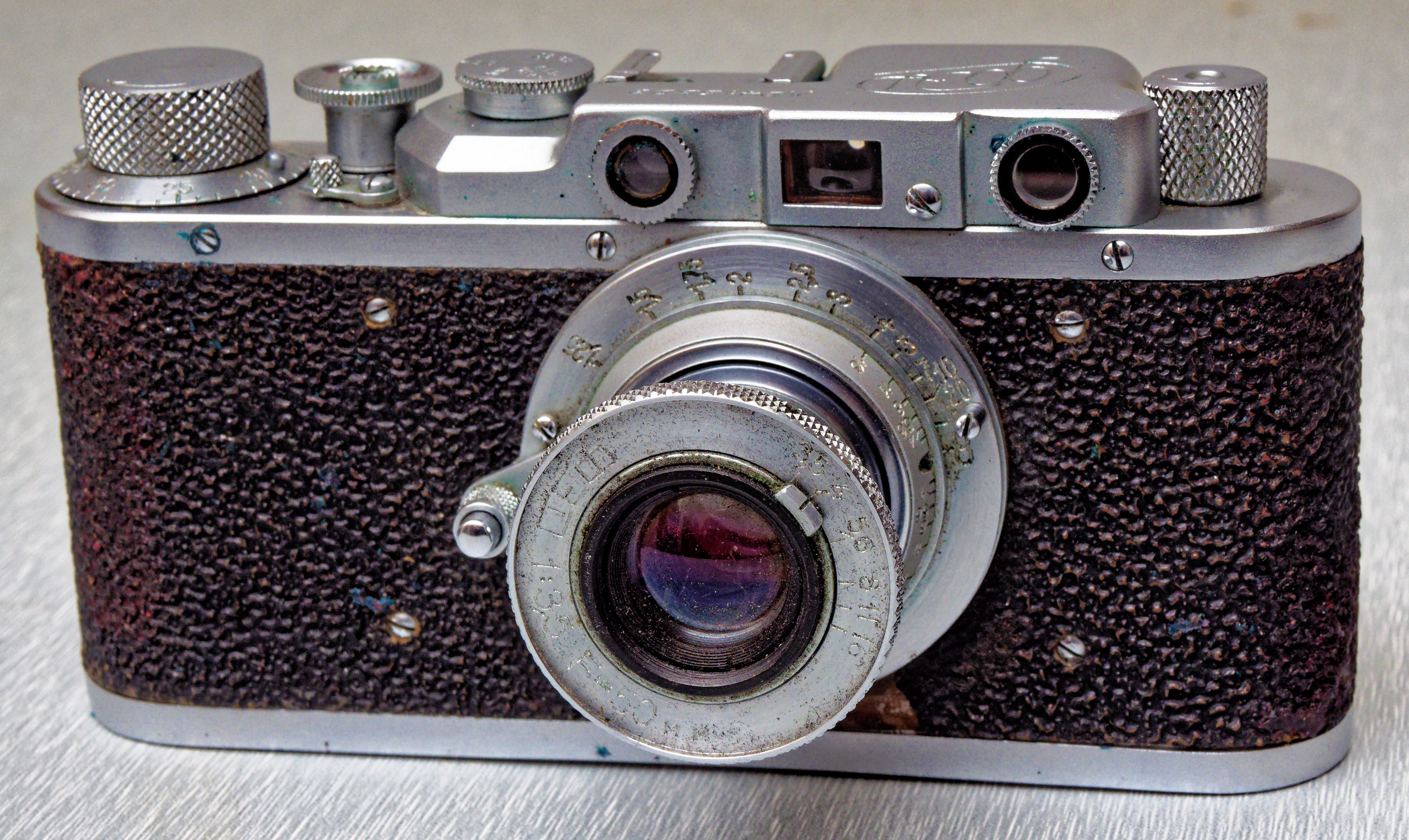
FED 1 with 50 mm f/3.5 FED lens

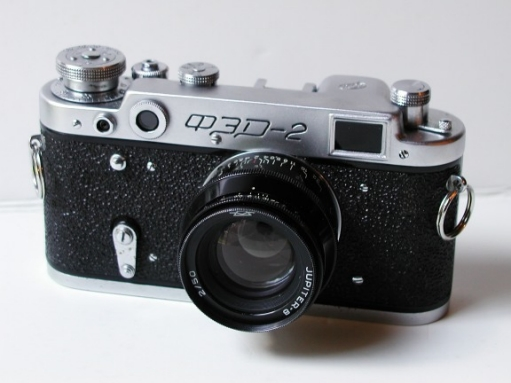
FED 2 with the Jupiter 8 Lens

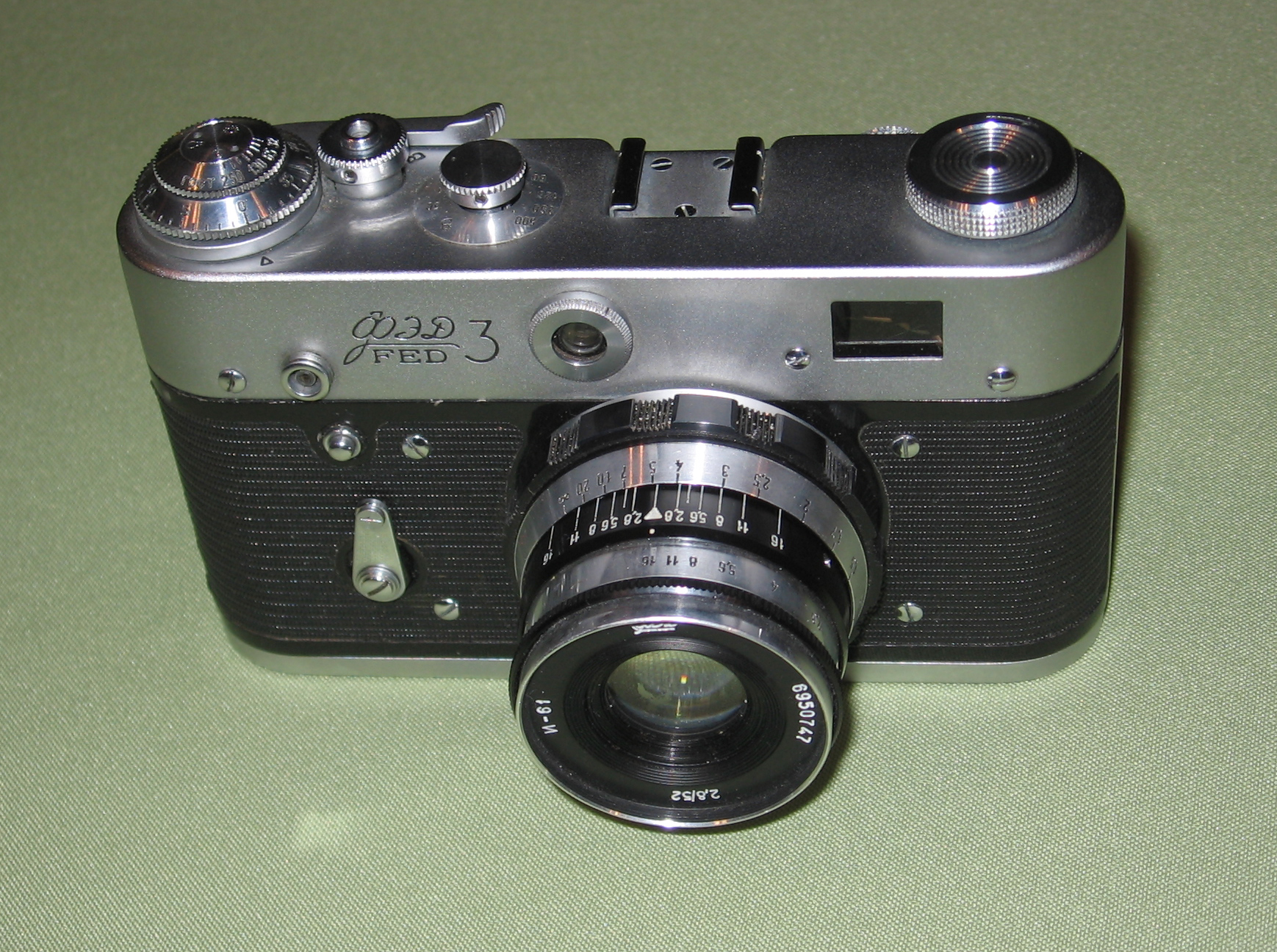
FED 3 with Industar 61 lens

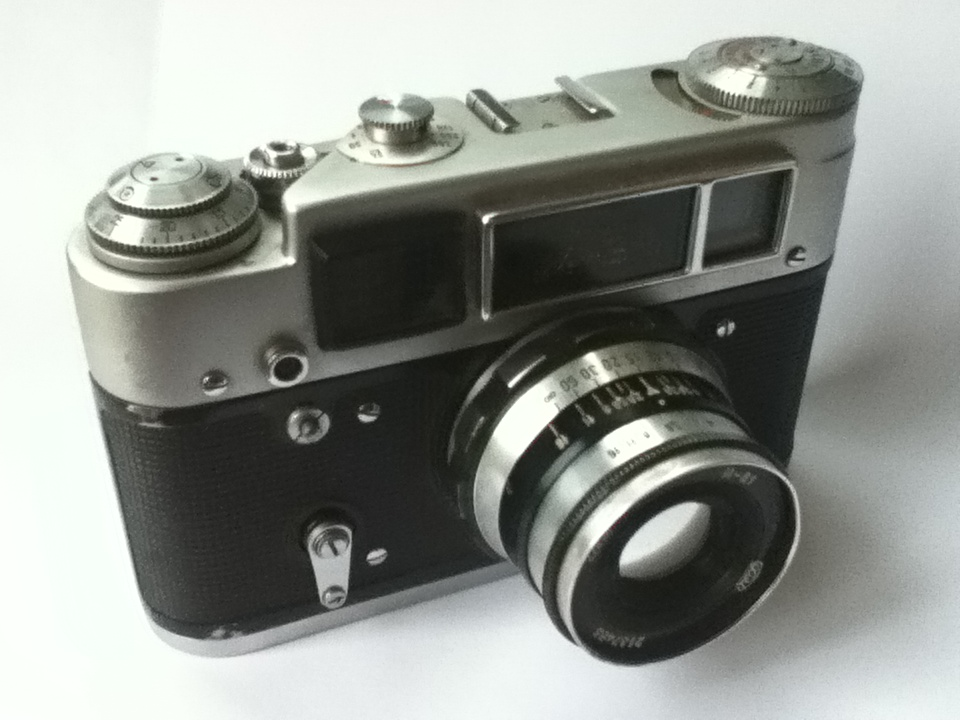
FED 4 with Industar 61 lens

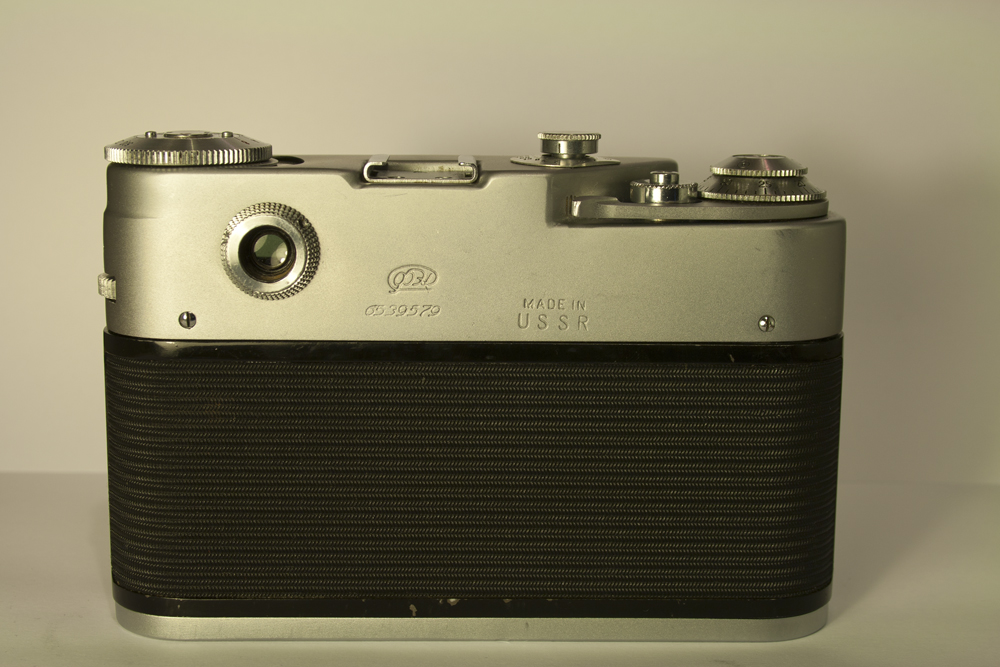
FED 4 showing the location of manufacture

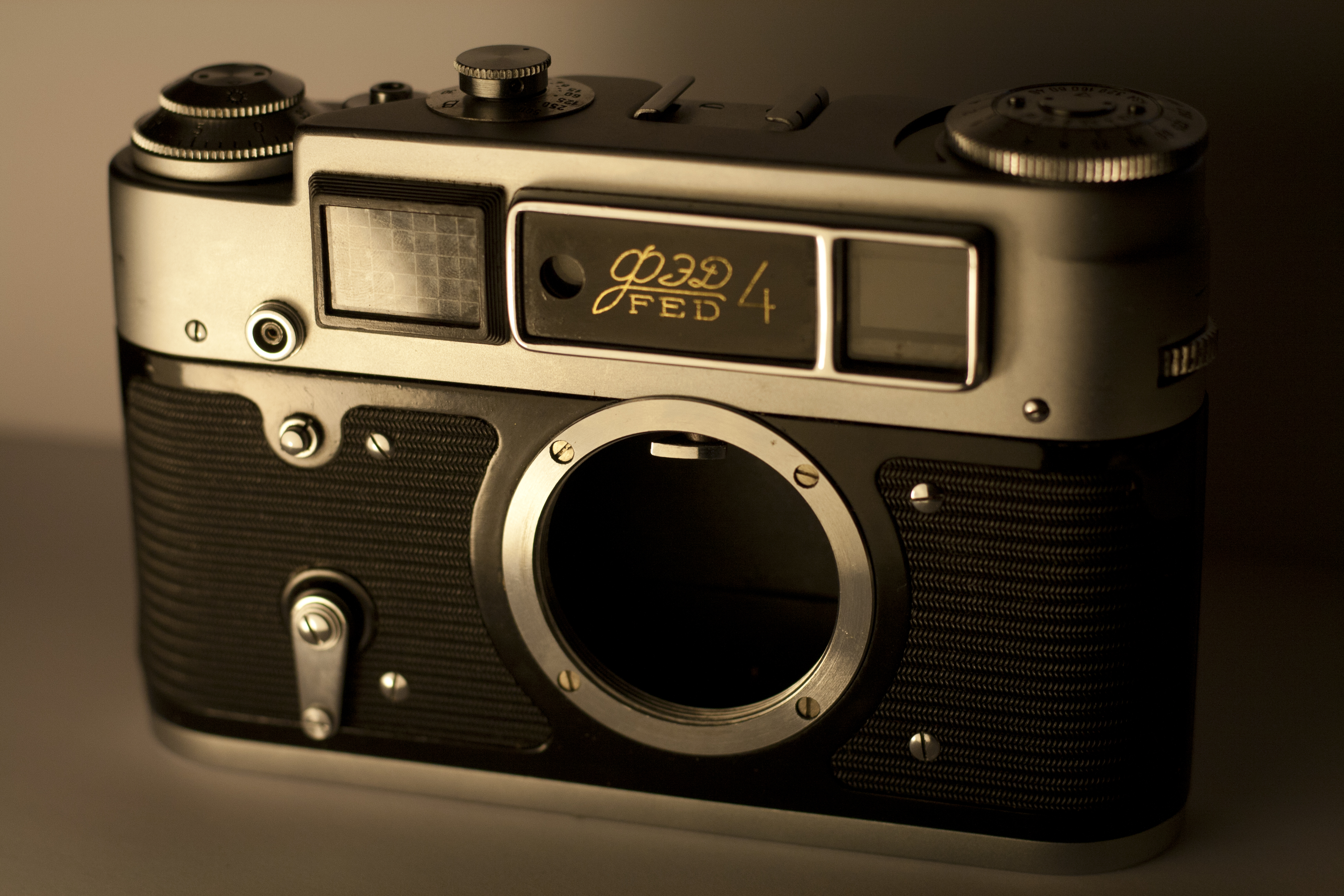
FED 4 (possibly early model, revision A) with the golden scroll print, showing its M39 mount

The FED is a Soviet rangefinder camera, mass-produced from 1934 until around 1996, and also the name of the factory that made it.

The factory emerged from the small workshops of the Children's labour commune named after Felix Edmundovich Dzerzhinsky (the acronym of which gave name to the factory and its products) in December 1927 in Kharkiv (Soviet Ukraine, now Ukraine). Initially the factory was managed by the head of the commune Anton Makarenko and produced simple electrical machinery (drills). In 1932, the new managing director of the factory, A.S. Bronevoy (Russian: А.С. Броневой), came up with the idea of producing a copy of the German Leica camera.

From 1955 FED began to innovate, combining the rangefinder with the viewfinder in the FED 2 and all its successors. The FED-3 added slow shutter speeds and on the later version FED-3 (b) the film advance was changed from a thumbwheel to a lever. The FED 4 (1964–77) added a non-coupled selenium exposure meter. The FED 5 marked the end of the FED rangefinder family and was meant as a replacement for both the FED-3 and FED-4, which were in production at the time of its introduction. There were versions of the FED-5: the original FED-5 had an exposure meter, the FED-5B was a cheaper version without meter and the later FED-5C had reflected framelines showing field of view of 50mm lens and an exposure meter. All FED-5 cameras were delivered with an Industar I-61L/D lens. Production of FED rangefinder cameras ended in the mid 1990s. Fed-5 Serial Number 545446 was made on 28 February 1994; Fed's site claims that it was in fact 1997: "Start of serial production of vertical drive for control system of tanks. Production of all types of camera has stopped. 8,647,000 cameras were manufactured since the beginning." This may be accurate as there are FED-5 cameras in existence with serial numbers up to at least 596692.

== FED 1 collector information ==
The following types are nomenclature used by collectors since no FED 1 or Fedka camera was actually marked in this way. Brief descriptions are included to help with identification.

- 1a 1934–1935 SN 31- 6000 (some sights have been done on early style, read 1a, cameras up to number 6500.
- 1b 1935–1937 SN 6000 – 55000 – Some with the NKVD engraving "Peoples Commissariat of Internal Affairs", which was the new name for Stalin's secret police.
- 1c 1937–1939 SN 55000 – 125000 – In 1937 a triangular cam-follower replaced the circular Leica-type cam follower and the speed dial was modified slightly to resemble the Leica II.
- S 1938–1941 – Identical to 1c except that 2000 cameras were produced with a faster 1/1000" shutter speed.
- V (B) 1938 – Identical to 1c except with a faster 1/1000" second shutter speed and a slow-speed dial.
- 1d 1939–1941 (August) SN 125000 – 180000 – Identifiable by the centre retaining screw being off-centre and not concealed by the lens-mount flange. In addition, in 1939 Ukraine.
- 1d 1942–1945 SN 174000 – 178000 – Around 4000 cameras manufactured in Berdsk from parts evacuated from the FED Ukraine factory before it was overrun by the Nazis.
- 1e SN 174000 – 180000 – Manufactured in Berdsk in Siberia in the first few months of 1946 after hostilities ended, using parts made before the war.
- T Engraved "Red Flag" in honour of new masters produced around SN 200000 and was fitted with a coated 50 mm f/3.5 Industar 10 lens
- 1f 1949–1953 SN 201800 – 400000 – New cursive-script Fed logo, flatter shutter button, coated lens engraved with what were then called the international f stops, f/4, f/5.6 and so on rather than the earlier f/4.5, f/6.3.
- 1949–1950 TSVVS – Two major circulating theories is that the cameras has either been manufactured at Moscow's Almaz factory or it had been ordered for manufacture by the Soviets from East Germany (possibly Zeiss, but it is also not confirmed). This camera is probably the most mysterious in nature out of all Soviet cameras. An old belief that this camera was made by FED factory is disputed by the fact that the body is wholly made out of brass and it is different dimensions physically than the FED-1 cameras. (see forum discussions at USSRPhoto.com for more detailed arguments about it between various Soviet camera experts).
- 1g 1953–1955 SN 400000 – 800000 – Shutter speeds changed to 25th, 50th,100th instead of old Leica 20th, 30th, 40th, 60th.

== FED 1 serial numbers and production numbers ==
- 1934 SN 000031 - 004000 - 4k
- 1935 SN 004001 - 016000 - 12k
- 1936 SN 016001 - 031000 - 15k
- 1937 SN 031001 - 053000 - 22k
- 1938 SN 053001 - 082000 - 29k
- 1939 SN 082001 - 116000 - 34k
- 1940 SN 116001 - 148000 - 32k
- 1941 SN 148001 - 175000 - 25k
- 1942 - 45 (World War 2) - see below
- 1946 SN 175001 - 176000 - 1k - see below
- 1947 SN 176001 - 186000 - 10k
- 1948 SN 186001 - 203000 - 13k
- 1949 SN 203001 - 221000 - 18k
- 1950 SN 221001 - 248000 - 27k
- 1951 SN 248001 - 289000 - 41k
- 1952 SN 289001 - 341000 - 53k
- 1953 SN 341001 - 424000 - 73k
- 1954 SN 424001 - 560000 - 136k
- 1955 SN 560001 - 700000 - 140k
- V (B) 1938 - 40
- S 1938 - 41 - 2k
- 1983 SN 104442 - 9377287 -150k

These serial numbers and production numbers are approximate. During World War II production was shifted to Siberia as the factory in Kharkiv was overrun by Nazi German forces. During this period and immediately after the war some serial numbers between 174000 - 180000 were used on cameras built in Berdsk in Siberia, even in the first few months of 1946.

== FED 1 lens type information ==
All pre war FED lenses had non standardized flange to film distances. Most of them require a shorter flange distance than Leica (28.8mm) and hence they can't be used on Leica screwmount camera bodies. On Leica bodies they will not focus to infinity and the rangefinder will not be accurate, resulting in unsharp images. This may be the reason for the sometimes poor reputation of FED lenses. However, properly adapted to a modern digital mirrorless camera body, that allows for accurate focusing, these lenses show an amazing image quality (provided the lenses elements are still unscratched and clean).

- 100 mm f/6.3 FED tele lens: Consists of 4 elements in two groups and was released in 1938 and produced until 1941. Official model designation: FED-36. A very sharp little lens that can be used wide open. Stopping down increases the tendency towards internal reflections, since the aperture blades are quite shiny.

- 100 mm f/5.9 1937–1938 FED prototype lens, best used at f/6.3 or smaller aperture.

- 50 mm f/3.5 collapsible FED lens: Consists of 4 elements in three groups like the Zeiss Tessar 50 mm f/3.5 (the Leitz Elmar has the aperture located behind the first element, the Zeiss Tessar has it behind the second element). The official model designation before the war was FED-10. There are actually no FED-10 lenses engraved with an "Industar-10" designation. The designation "Industar" was first used on the succeeding model, the Industar-22. The FED-10 was manufactured 1934–1946(?) and fitted to most FED 1a, 1b, 1c and 1d. Pre war lenses feature the old-style aperture scale f/3.5, 4.5, 6.3, 9, 12.5, 18 and a 50 M/M. Post war lenses feature the new-style aperture scale f/3.5, 5.6, 8, 11, 16 and a 50 MM engraving. Most post war lenses were coated except for some very early ones.

- 50 mm f/2 fast FED lens: Consists of 6 elements in 4 groups like the Leitz Summar, but the unlike the Summar it features five elements with flat surfaces, while the elements of the Summar have only curved surfaces. Official model designation: unknown. Production period 1938–1941. The optical performance is slightly weaker than that of the Leitz Summar, as it shows slight chromatic aberrations in the far corners of the image,

- 50 mm f/3.5 macro lens. A number of variants with different engravings exist, but they were all not rangefinder coupled. The official model designation was FED-19. They are based on the FED-10 design and were intended for reproduction work. Correct focussing was achieved by measuring the distance from the subject to an engraved ring on the lens barrel. These lenses feature two scales: One with the magnification ratio (M) ranging from ∞ (= 1:∞) to 2 (= 1:2). Above each magnification value one finds the corresponding distance, measured from the engraved ring to the subject. Infinity has obviously no corresponding distance value and so the distance scale starts with 105(cm) for magnification 1:20 and ends with 15(cm) for magnification 1:2.

- 28 mm f/4.5 FED wide angle lens: Released in 1938 and produced until 1941. The official model designation was FED-35. The optical design was rather complex, featuring 6 elements in 4 groups and it was faster than its contemporary competitors, the Leitz Hektor 28 mm f/6.3 and the Zeiss Tessar 28 mm f/4.5. The FED-35 shows severy vignetting wide open and a quite low contrast. Stopping down to f/6.3 and below boosts the image quality to a very respectable quality.

== FED 1 technical specifications, 1934 (or Fedka) ==
- Copy of the Leica II.
- Manufactured 1934–1955 (spec as 1934 Fedka).
- Aperture settings: f/3.5, f/4.5, f/6.3, f/9, f/12.5, f/18 Lens is screw mount 39mm Leica-type, but not standardized to the Leica 28.8mm flange distance!
- Shutter is cloth focal-plane.
- Shutter speeds: Z - 20th, 30th, 40th, 60th, 100th, 200th, 500th.
- Focusing: 1.25 M to infinity.
- Coupled range finder with a separate viewfinder.
- Film is standard 35mm.
- Loading via a removable bottom.
- Weight is approximately 630 g.

=== Notes ===
1948 or 1949 onwards Industar-10 lens with "international" f stops, f/3.5, f/4, f/5.6, f/8, f/11, f/16 1953 onwards Shutter speeds changed to 25th, 50th, 100th, 200th, 500th.
