= FED 2 =

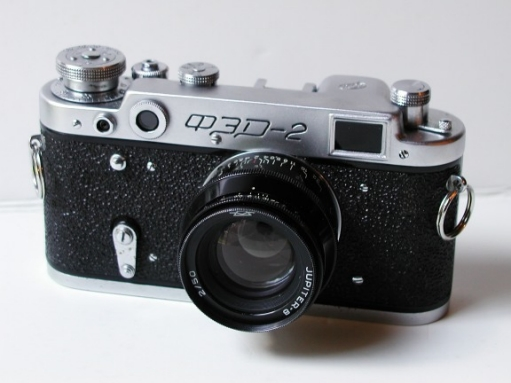

Overview
- Maker: State enterprise Kharkiv Machinery Plant "FED"
- Type: 35 mm rangefinder camera
- Production: 1955-1970

Focusing
- Focus: manual

General
- Made in: Ukrainian SSR

Chronology
- Predecessor: FED
- Successor: FED 3

The FED 2 (ФЭД-2) was a 35 mm rangefinder camera introduced in 1955 by FED. The name of FED comes from the initial of Felix Edmundovich Dzerzhinsky. It was the successor of the FED camera, a Soviet copy of the German Leica II. More than 1.6 million cameras were made between 1955 and 1970.

== Major features ==
The main difference between FED 2 and its predecessor was the combined wiewfinder and rangefinder window, allowing to focus using only one aperture. The rangefinder base increased to 67mm. The body was entirely built with metal, mostly aluminium, making the camera more durable than more recent Soviet cameras. It also had a mechanical self timer, a diopter and a detachable back that simplified loading the film. They usually came with Industar-26M or Industar-61 50mm f2/8 lens.

== Variations ==
Six variations were produced.

- FED 2a was introduced in 1955.
- FED 2b had flash sync added. The new shutter speed dial had the reference point on a center post that rotates with the dial as the shutter is fired.
- FED 2c had the flash sync port moved to the top deck from the body. It also had a mushroom-shaped film advance knob.
- FED 2d had a new set of shutter speeds, from 1/30 to 1/500, instead of the older set of 1/25 to 1/500.
- FED 2L is the only factory-designated model number; all other models are stamped FED 2 by the factory. The body is identical to the FED 2d body but the lens supplied is an Industar-61 with Lanthane glass instead of the Industar-26 used in models 2b to 2d.
- FED 2e is a FED 3b with the FED 2d shutter that does not have the slow speeds. Similar to the 3b, it does not have strap lugs but has a film-advance lever. Production ended around 1970.

== Operation ==
To load a film, two locks in the base of the camera need to be turned. The entire back and bottom can then be removed as a single unit, allowing easy access to the film chamber. Standard 35 mm film cassettes are used, with film being wound onto a removable take-up spool (the latter often becomes difficult to remove on older cameras). Winding the film cocks the shutter and forwards the frame counter simultaneously. The FED 2 has a manual frame counter located below the wind-on knob, which must be reset by hand when loading film.

== Shutter ==
The Fed 2 has a curtain shutter with speeds from B, 1/25-1/500s or 1/30-1/500, depending on the variation. After detaching the back, two screws on under the camera allow you to adjust the spring tension and change the shutter speeds, which may have become slow over time. As with similar cameras, it is important to cock the shutter before operating the shutter speed dial. Failing to do so may harm the mechanism. When firing, this dial will rotate. After re-cocking, the speed set will be indicated correctly again.

== Gallery ==
=== FED 2b ===
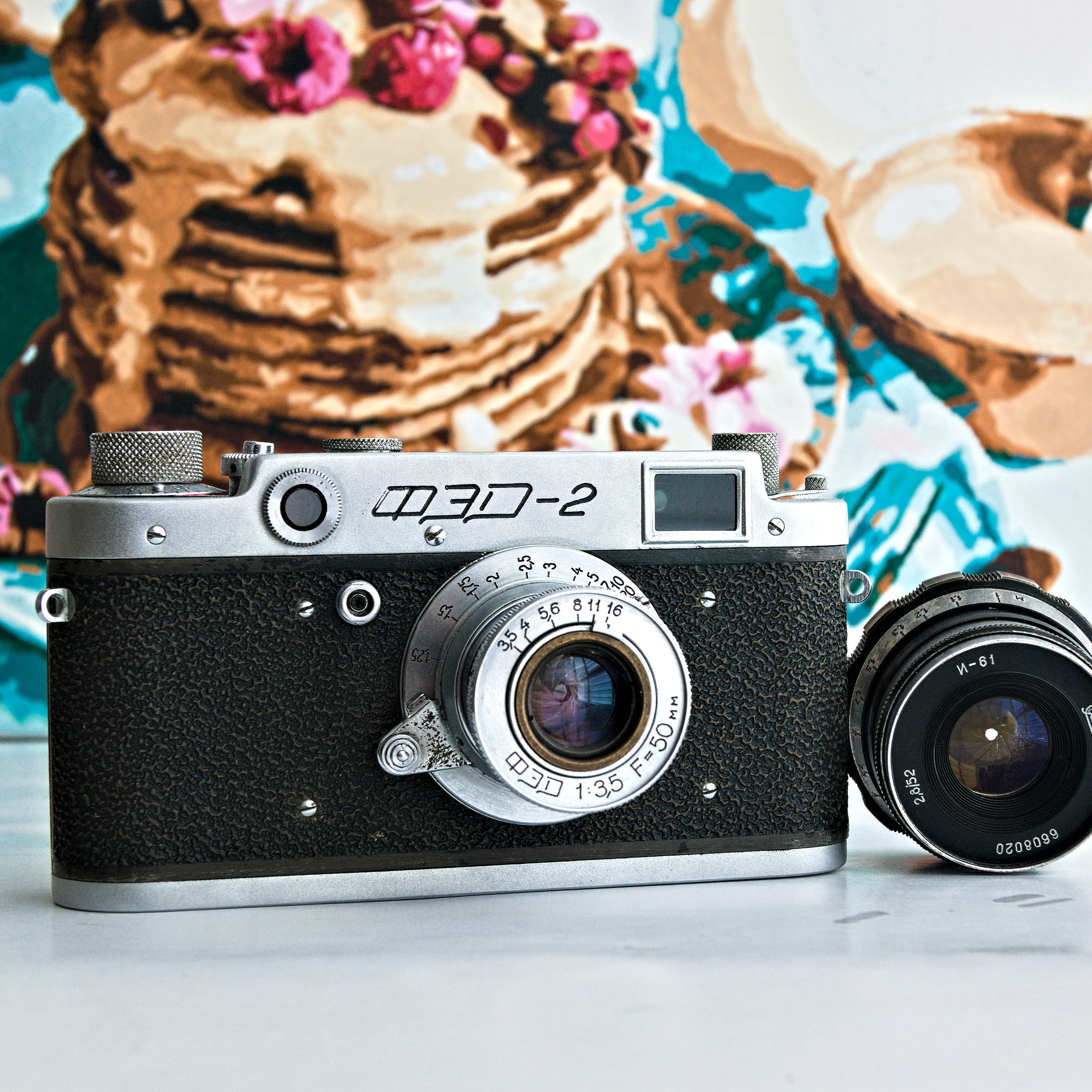
FED 2b with FED 50 mm f/3.5 lens

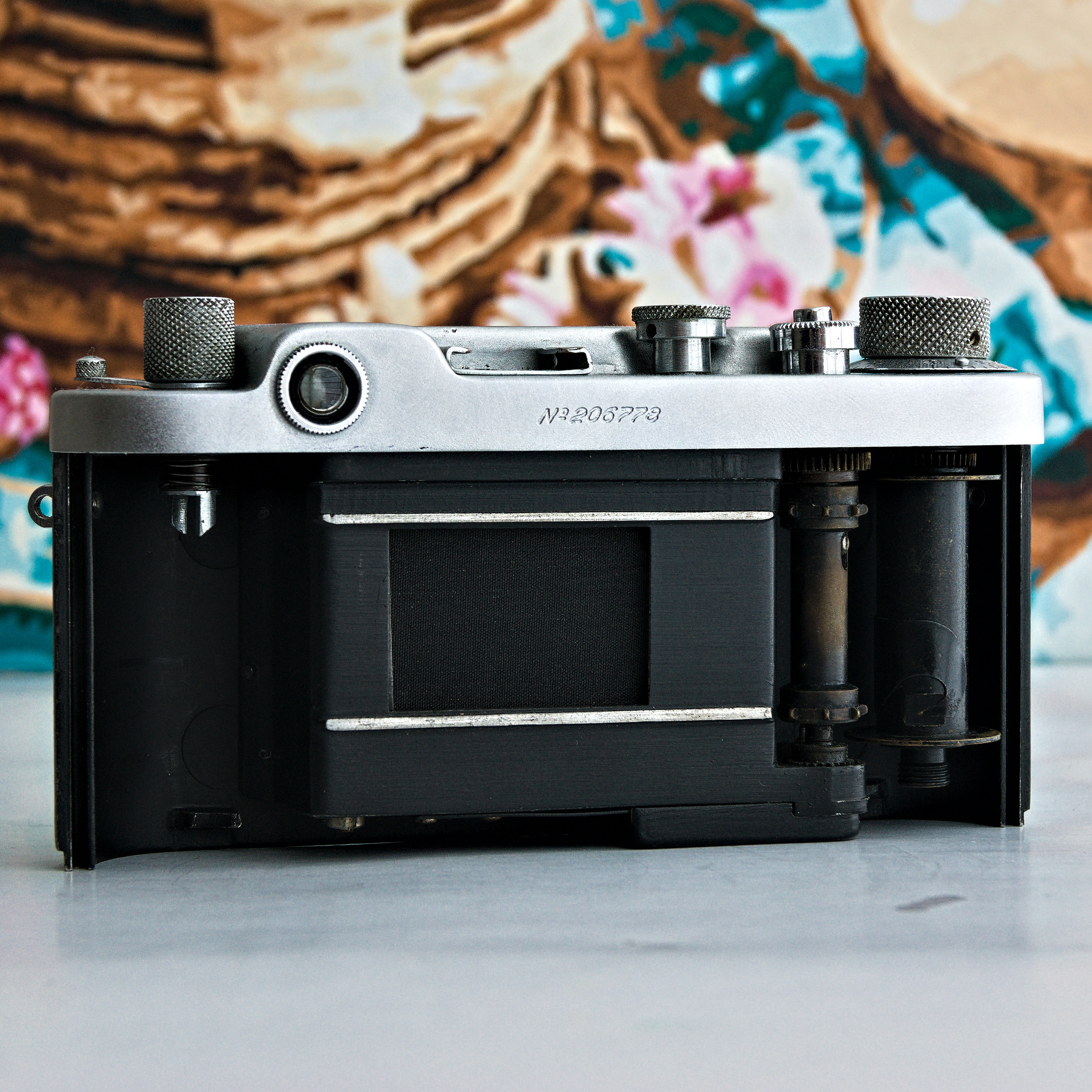
Open back

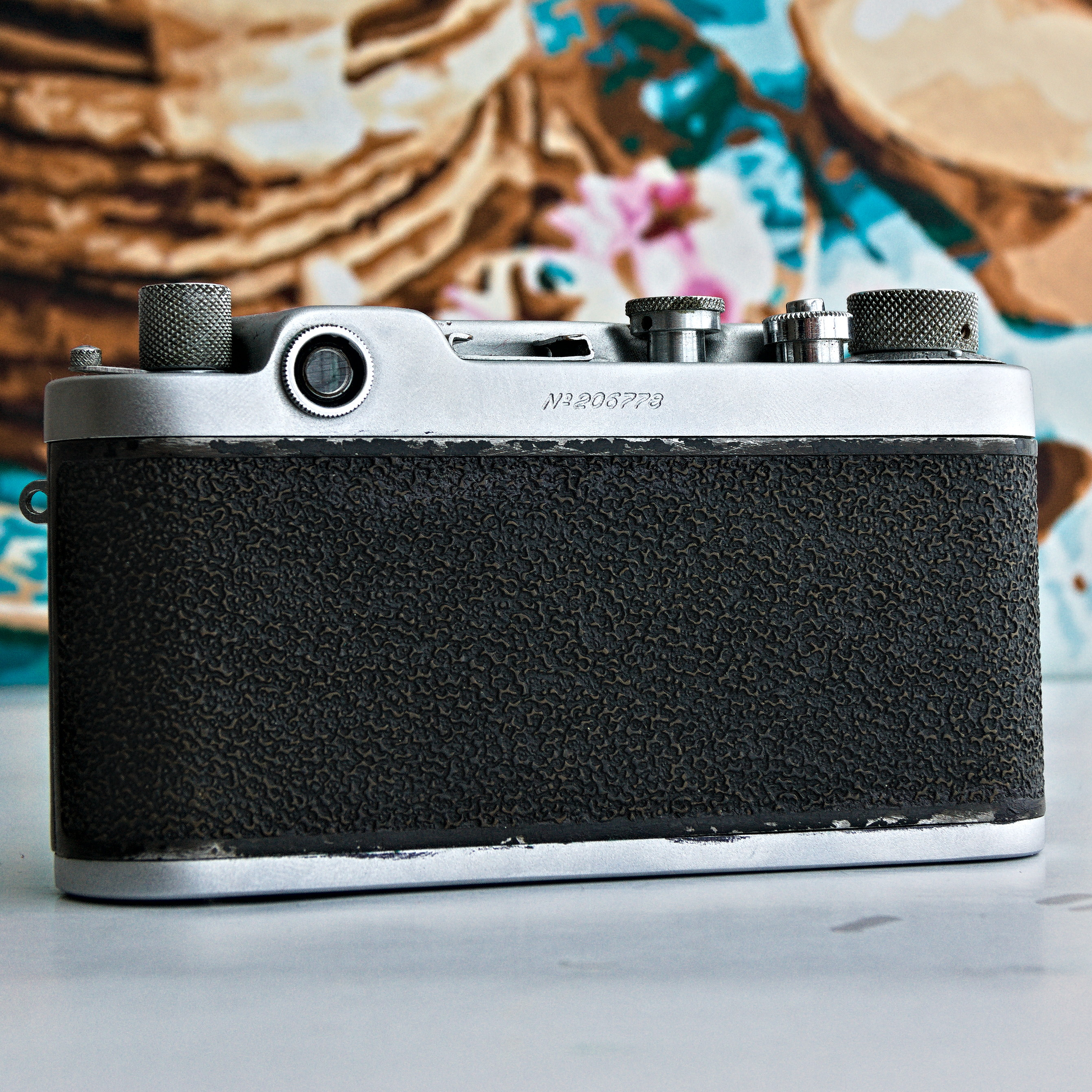
Closed back

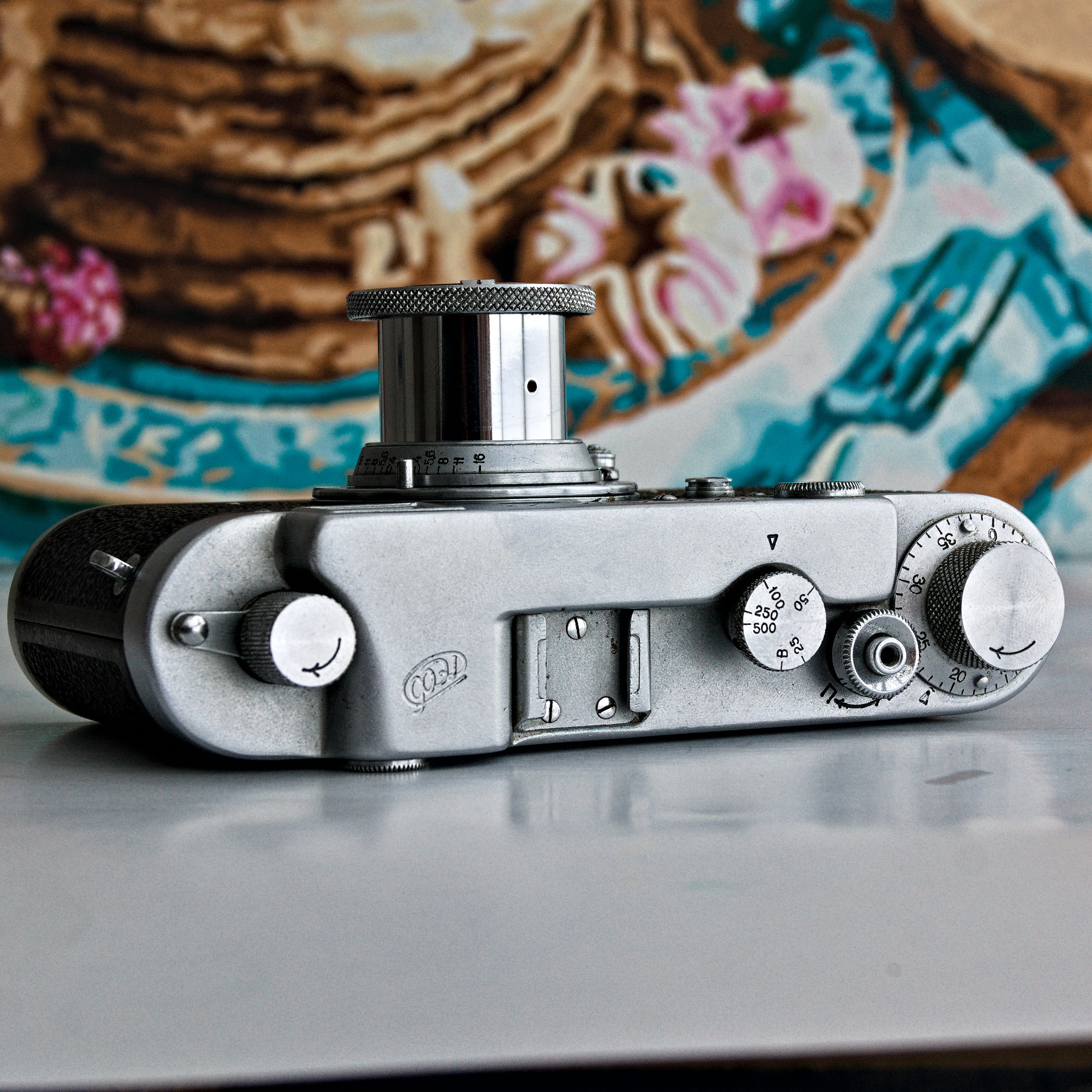
Top cover

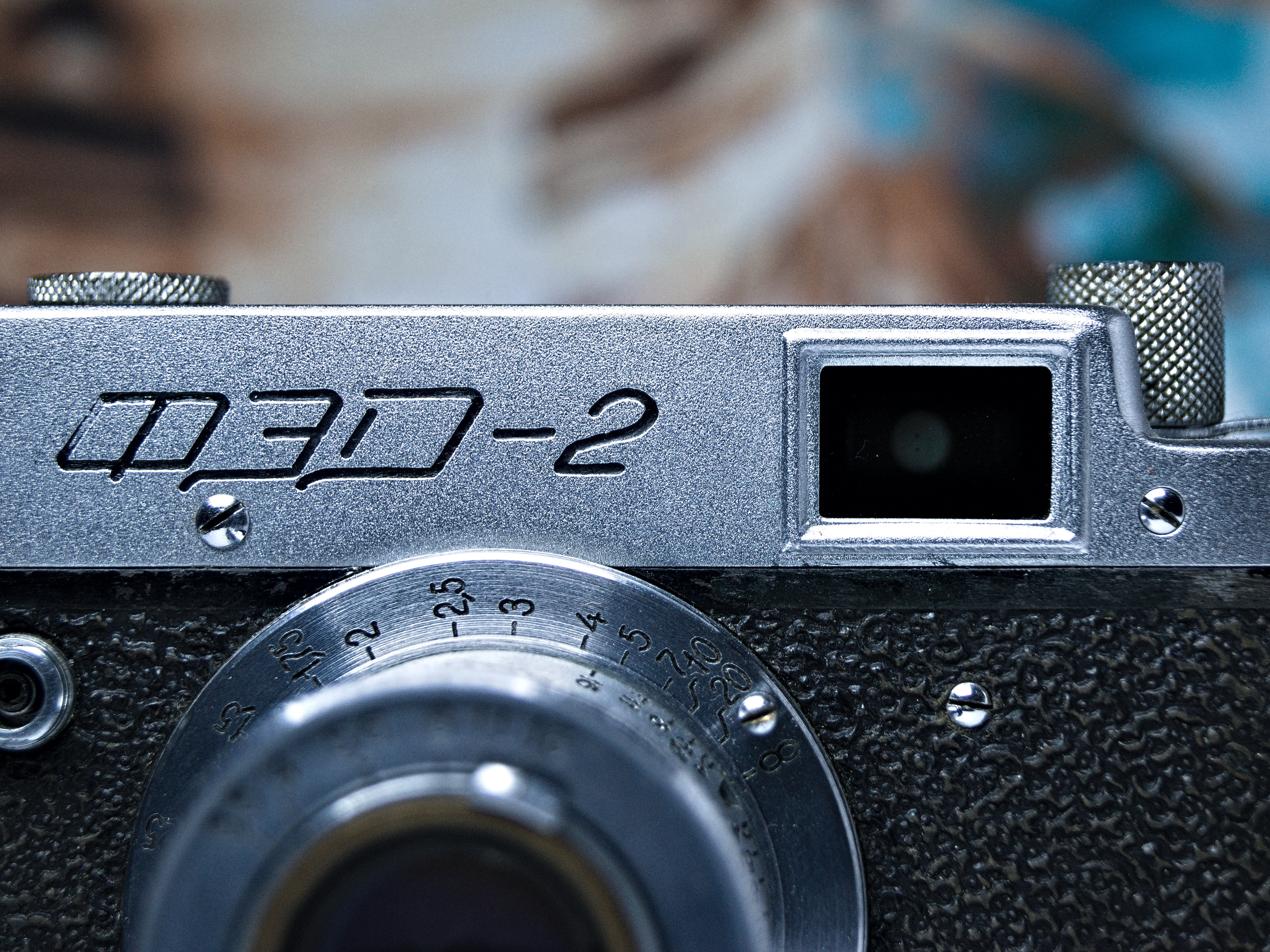
Viewfinder window

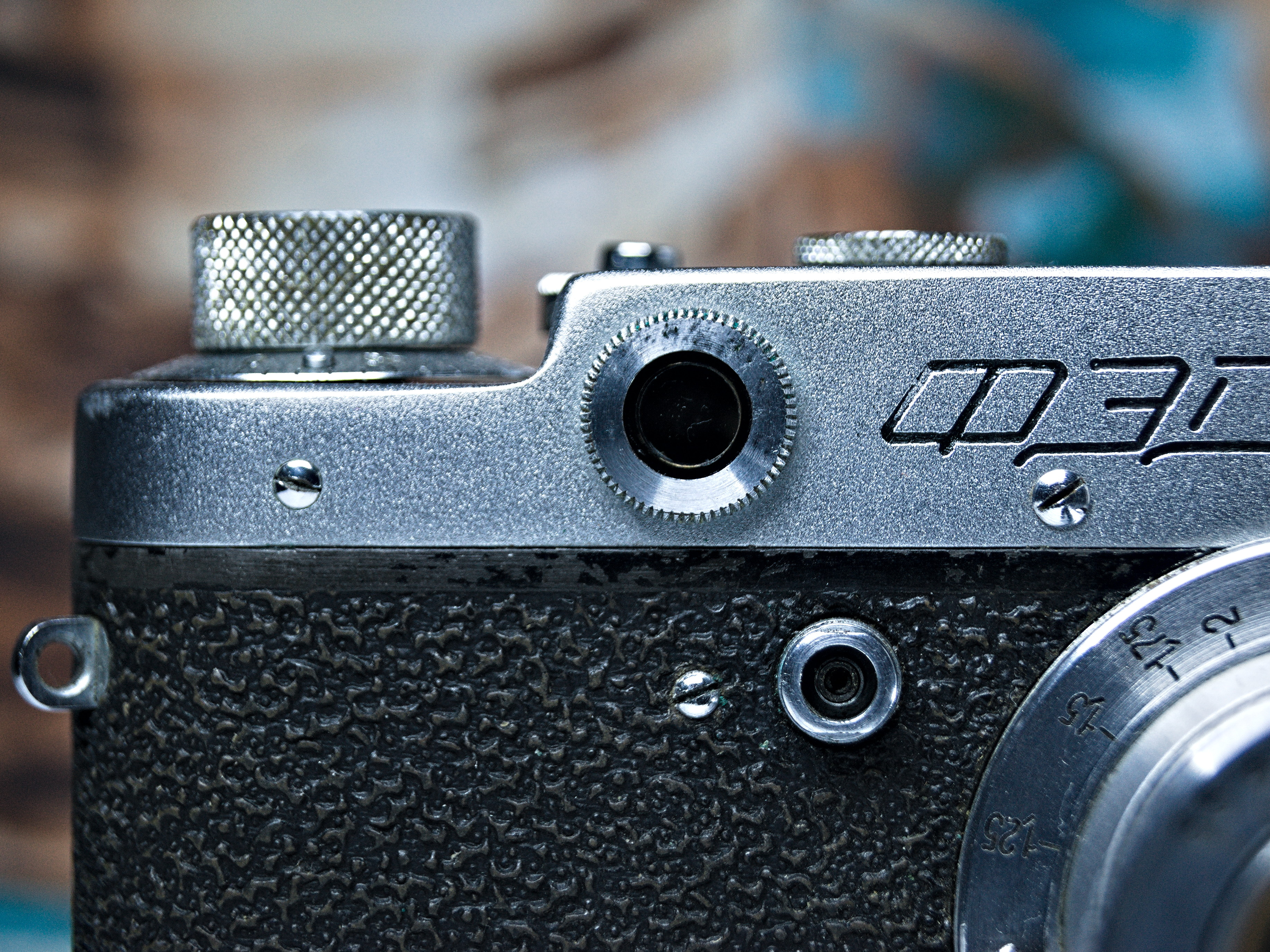
Rangefinder window and sync port

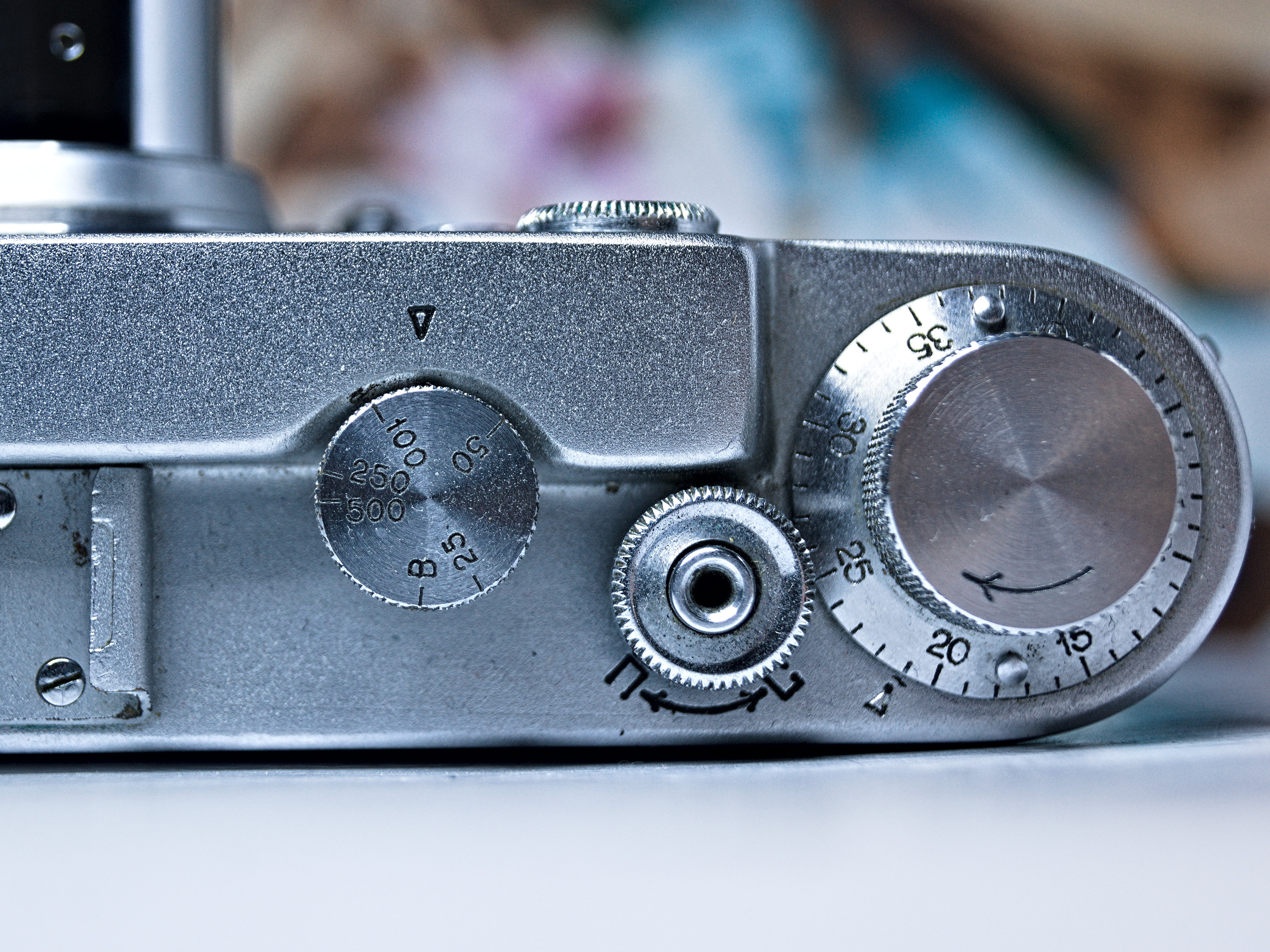
Shutter speed dial

=== FED 2d ===
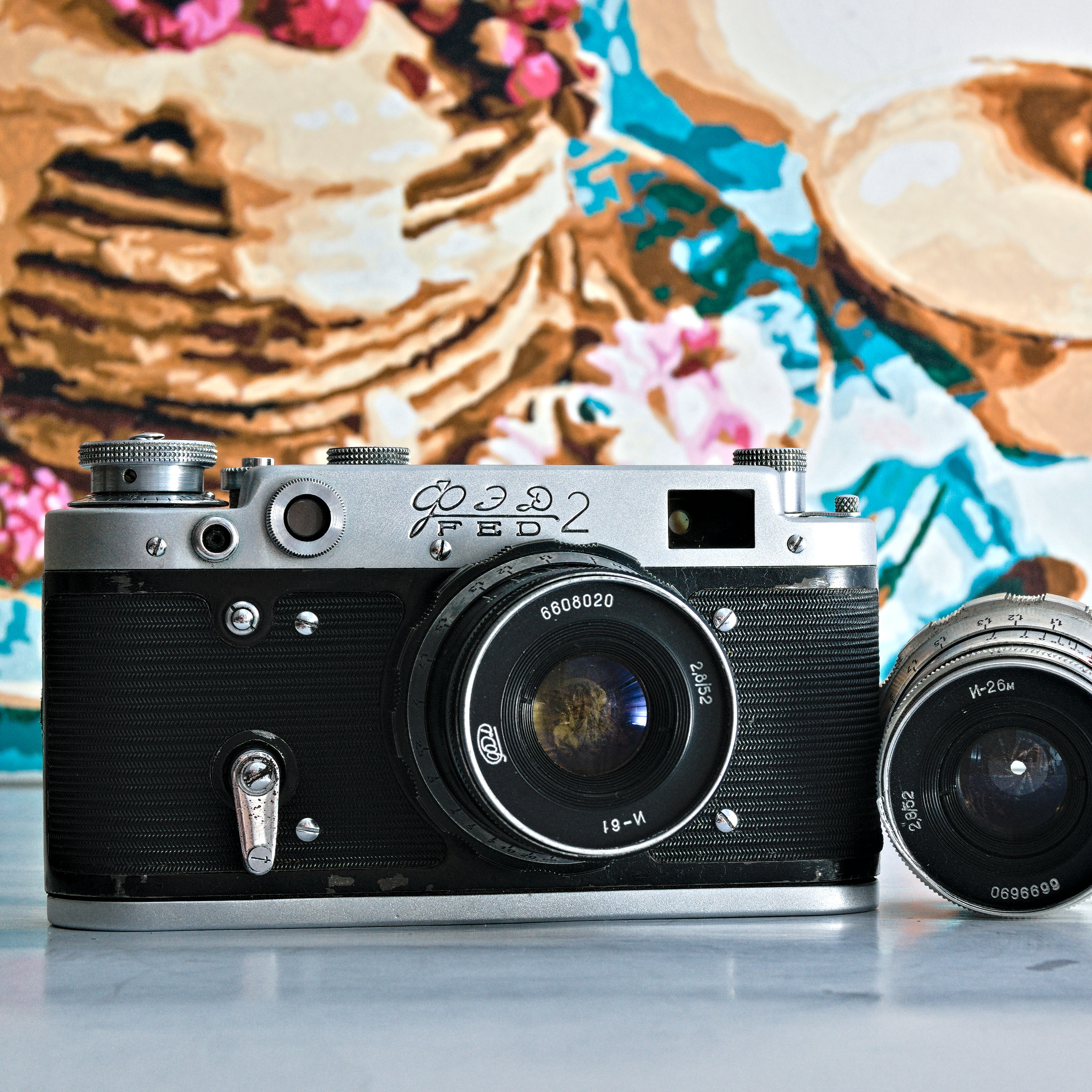
FED 2d with Industar 61

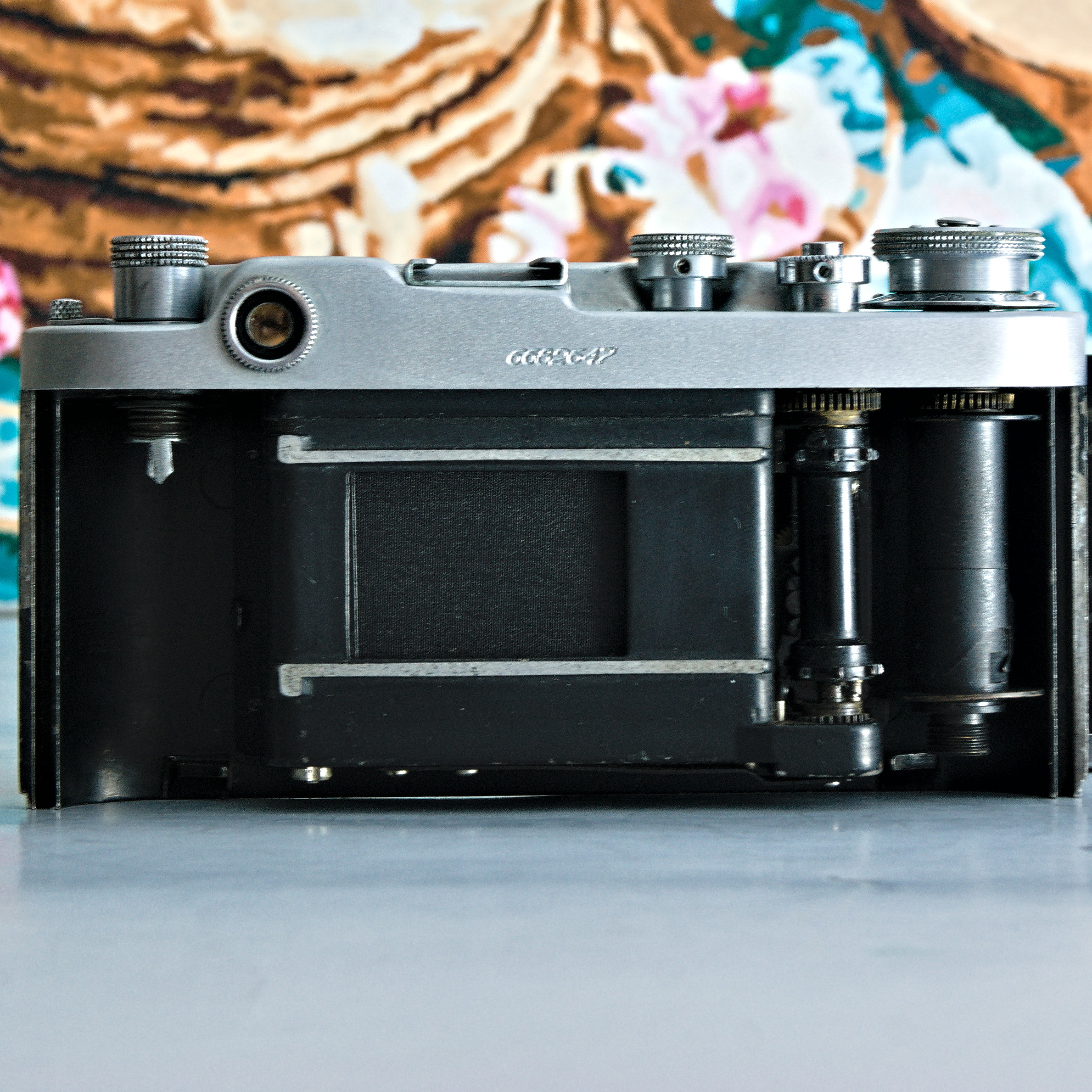
Open back

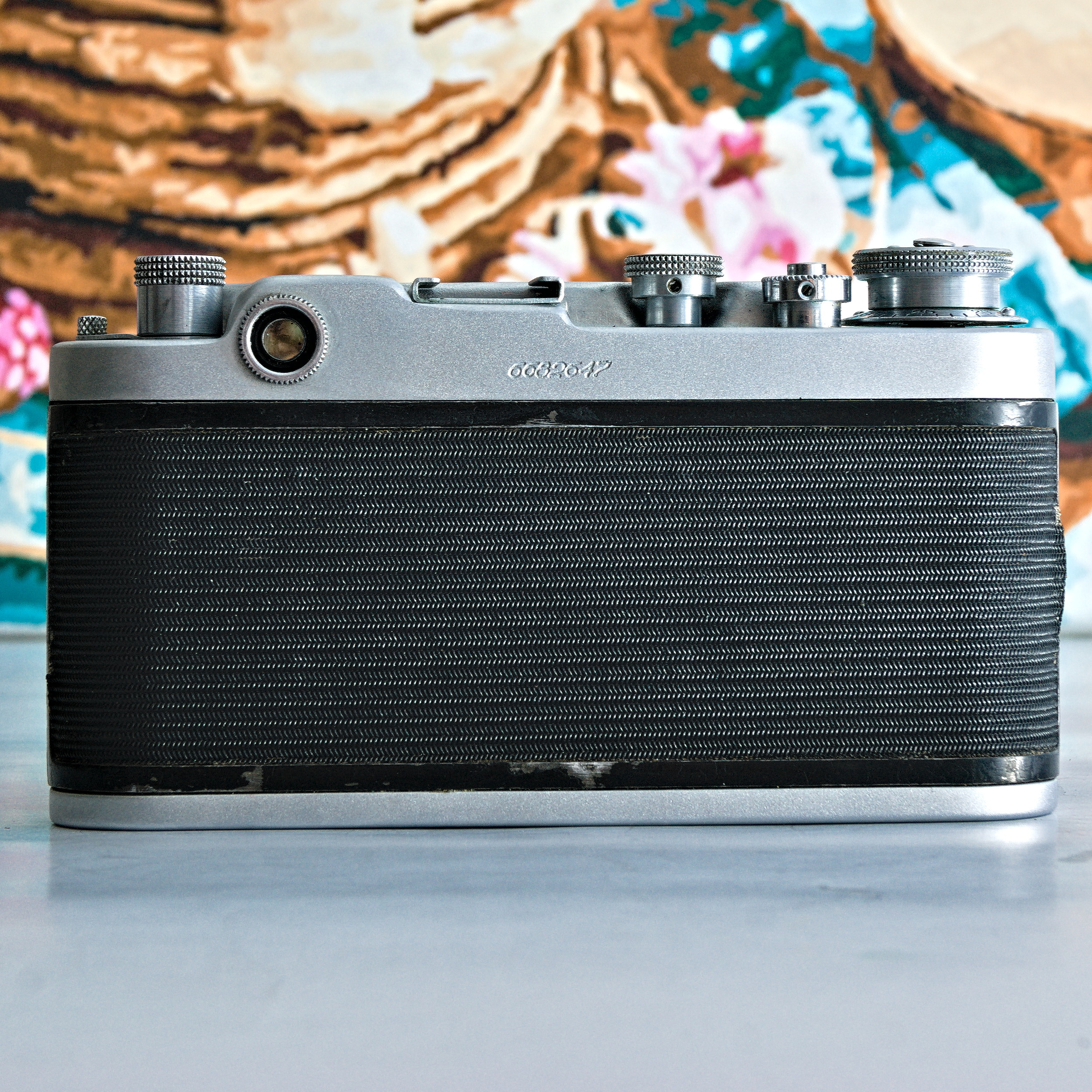
Closed back

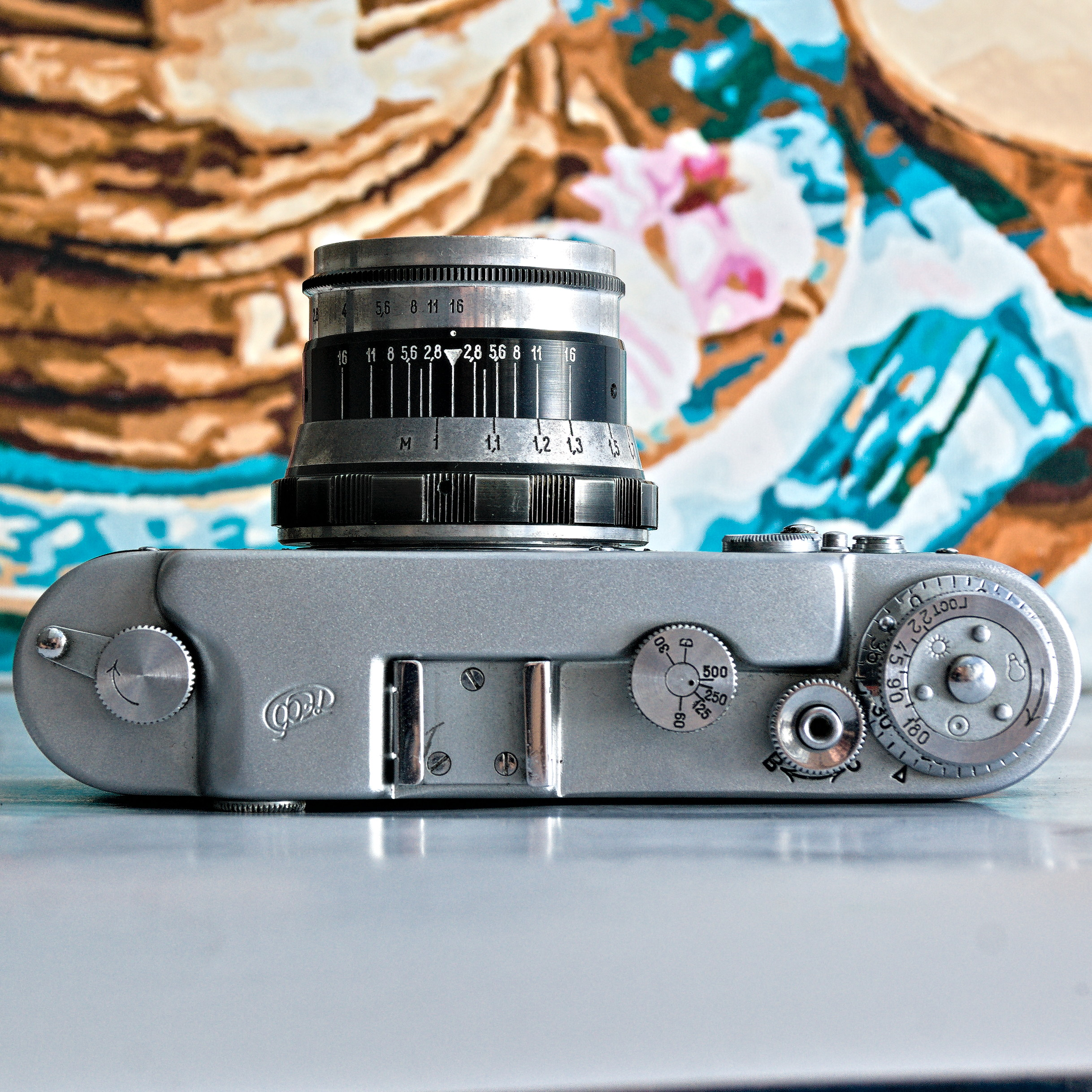
Top cover

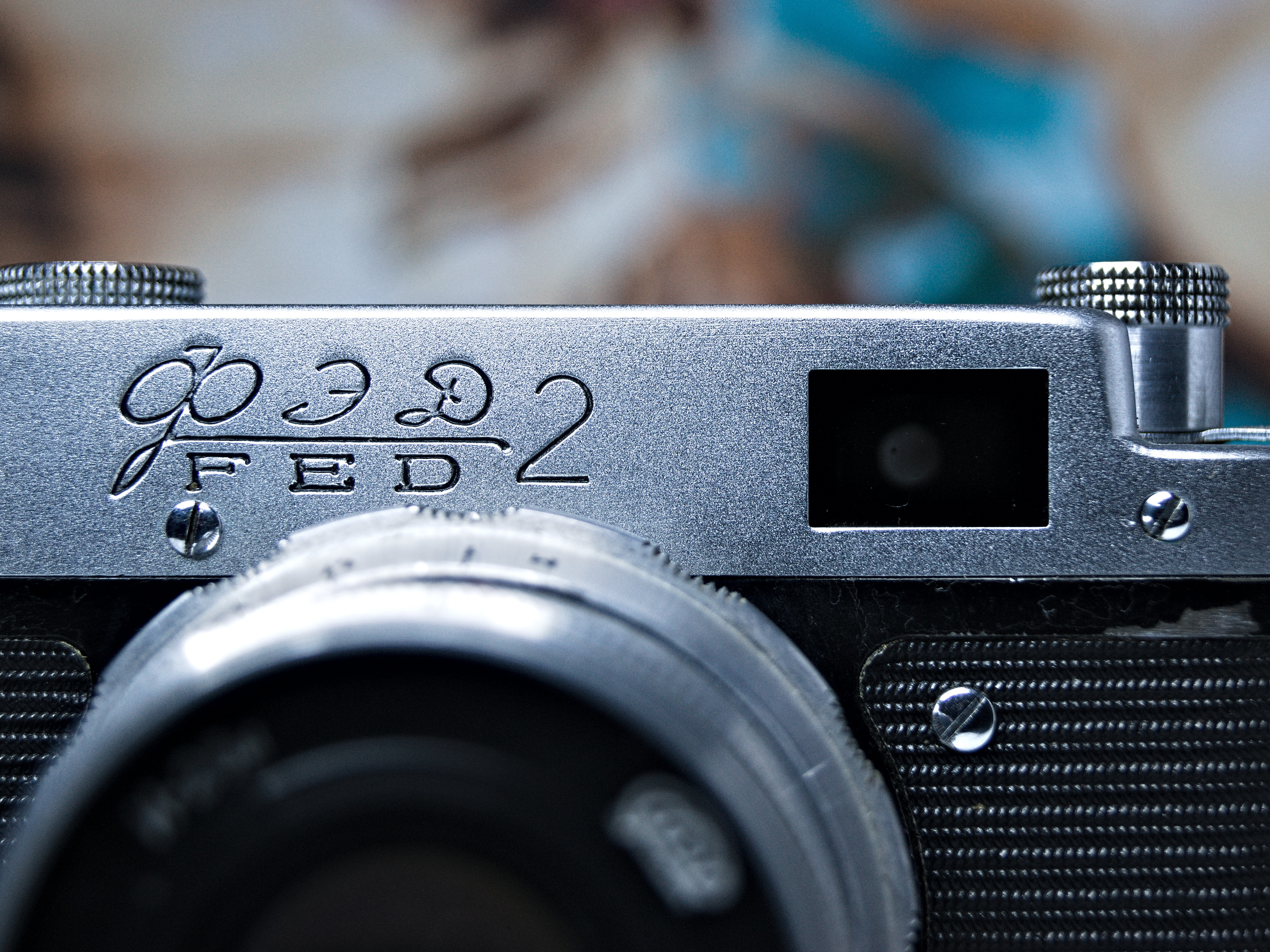
Viewfinder window

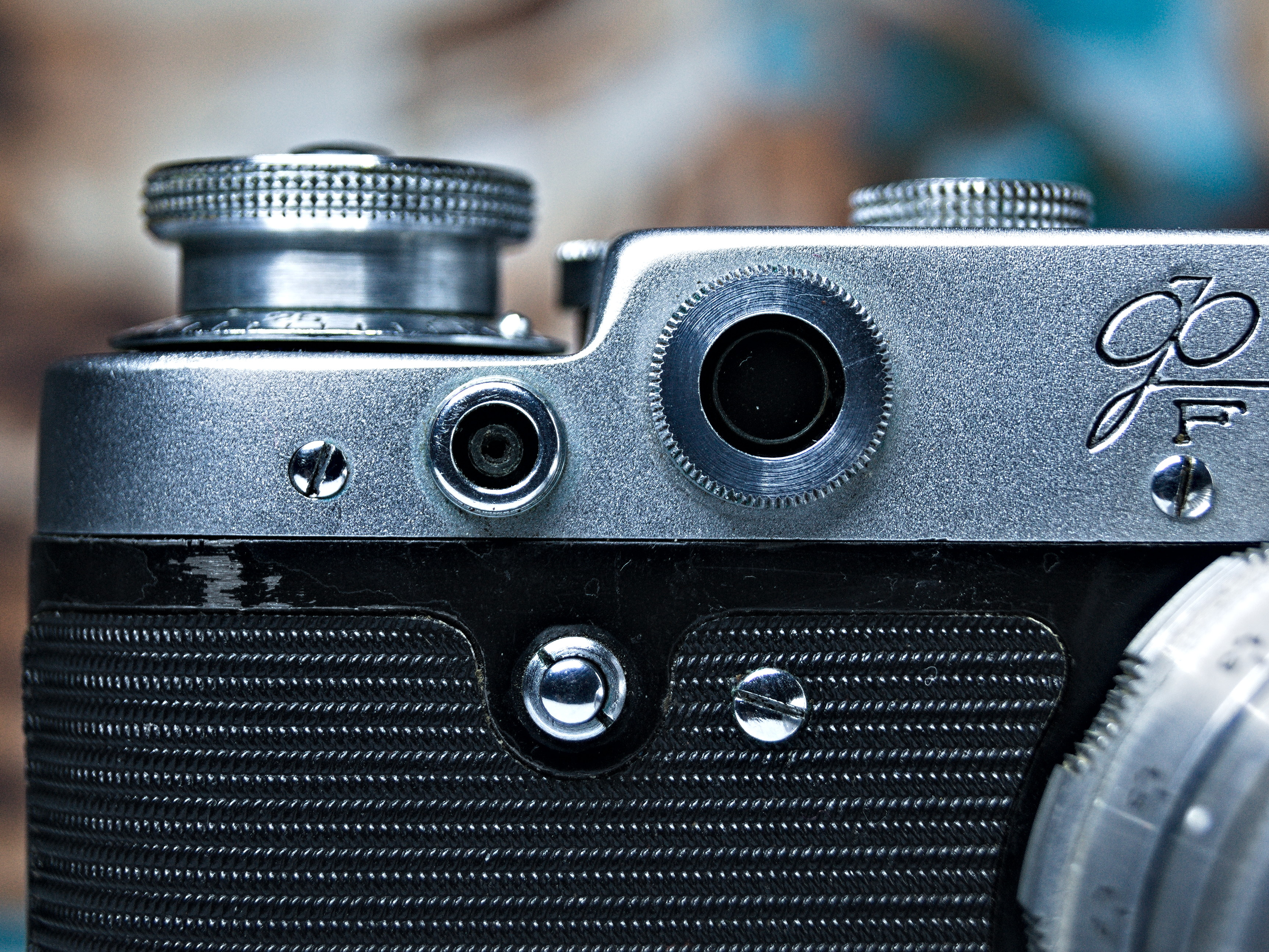
Rangefinder window and sync port

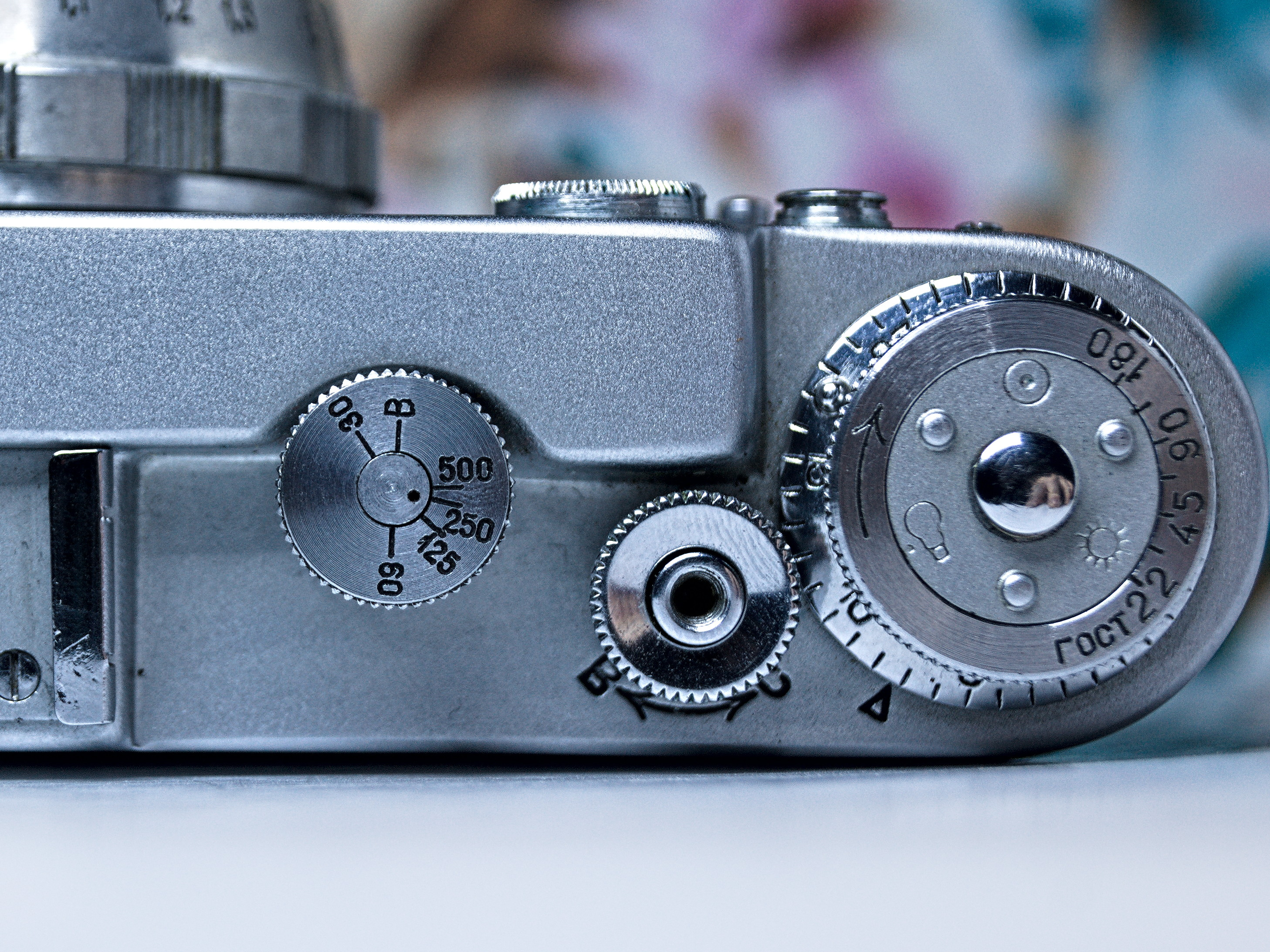
Shutter speed dial

== Lens ==
The FED takes 39 mm screw lenses. The one shown here is a 50mm Jupiter-8 lens. Many FEDs come with Industar lenses. On this lens, the aperture is set on the front and focusing is done with a focusing ring. The rangefinder is coupled to the lens. The field of view in the viewfinder is that of a 5 cm lens. For other focal lengths, a separate turret viewfinder was placed on the accessory shoe.
