= Hamas in the First Intifada =

Overview of Hamas's role in the First Intifada

Hamas is a Sunni Islamist Palestinian nationalist organization, founded during the First Intifada in 1987. While Hamas played a minor role in the Intifada, it successfully used the Intifada to grow and position itself as an alternative to the secular, left-wing Palestinian Liberation Organisation following the end of the Intifada and the start of the Oslo Accords peace process.

== Background ==
On 9 December 1987, an Israeli truck driver collided with and killed four Palestinians in the Jabalia refugee camp in the Gaza Strip. The incident sparked the largest wave of Palestinian unrest since the Israeli occupation began in 1967: the First Intifada. During the early stages, the Intifada was largely characterised by a non-violent campaign led by a decentralised, grassroots leadership, with actions including labour strikes, tax strikes, boycotts of Israeli goods, boycotts of Israeli institutions, demonstrations, the establishment of underground classrooms and cooperatives, raisings of the banned Palestinian flag, and civil disobedience. The Israeli government responded to the breakout of the Intifada with a harsh crackdown, however, and the Intifada grew more violent during its last stages, including Palestinian internal political violence against rumoured collaborators. By the end of the Intifada, over a thousand Palestinians had been killed and over a hundred thousand injured by Israeli forces, with around two hundred Israelis having been killed by Palestinians. The First Intifada would come to an end with several high-profile peace negotiations, including the Madrid Conference of 1991 and the 1993 Oslo Accords.

== History ==
=== Prelude ===
In the 1970s, the Muslim Brotherhood in the Gaza Strip began to re-emerge as an influential faction in Palestinian politics. Led by Ahmed Yassin and his charity, Mujama al-Islamiya, the Brotherhood rejected the secular nationalist politics and armed struggle of the Palestinian Liberation Organisation (PLO), preferring to focus on the creation of an Islamist society in Gaza that would be able to confront Israel in a holy war. By 1987, the Brotherhood had built a significant network in Gaza, including doubling the number of mosques, offering welfare and social services in refugee camps, and seizing control of the Islamic University of Gaza. The Brotherhood also promoted Islamist conservative norms, including encouraging women to veil, pressuring restaurants to stop selling alcohol, and ransacking offices of left-wing organizations such as the Palestine Red Crescent Society. During this period, the growth of the Brotherhood's network was tolerated by the Israeli government as a means to undermine the PLO and divide the Palestinian nationalist movement.

Through the 1980s, due to pressure from the founding of the Palestinian Islamic Jihad, the success of the Iranian Revolution in establishing an Islamist state, and growing frustration among its youth members over their inaction against Israel, Yassin's network began to re-organize itself into a paramilitary group capable of more directly participating in the Israeli-Palestinian Conflict.

=== Formation ===
In the days following the breakout of the First Intifada in early December 1987, Yassin and the other leaders of the Muslim Brotherhood network in Gaza met to debate how the network should respond to the uprising. Those leaders included Abdul Fatah Dukhan, Abdel Aziz al-Rantisi, and Salah Shehade. On 14 December 1987, they released a leaflet announcing the formation of a new movement: Ḥarakat al-Muqāwamah al-ʾIslāmiyyah, the Islamic Resistance Movement, abbreviated as Hamas, the Arabic word for zeal. According to Jean-Pierre Filiu of Sciences Po, the outbreak of the Intifada was "as much a surprise to the Muslim Brotherhood as to the PLO. The Islamist leadership was tempted to keep a low profile, and it was ultimately Shaykh Yasin who imposed on his divided followers his decision to participate in the uprising against Israel."

According to Palestinian academic Khaled Hroub, the factors that led to the founding of Hamas with the breakout of the First Intifada included: internal debates within the Muslim Brotherhood over its stance towards the Israeli occupation, with parts of the organisation calling for the priority to be confronting Israel and other parts calling for the priority to be Islamising Palestinian society; the growing resentment against the occupation and poverty among the population of the Gaza Strip; as well as rivalry with the fast-growing and more militant Palestinian Islamic Jihad. According to American researcher Sara Roy, it was "clear that Palestinians could not be easily persuaded of the Islamic vision or its gradual, reformist approach. As the occupation turned twenty years old, the ability to win hearts and minds depended less on the establishment of an Islamic state and far more on ending Israel’s occupation through armed struggle. It was this understanding and quest for authenticity and the need to secure a popular base of support (especially among the young) that contributed to a dramatic strategic shift within the Islamic movement."

In August 1988, Hamas formulated its founding charter, containing 36 short articles. The charter portrayed the Israeli-Palestinian conflict as a war between Muslims and Jews, and contained a significant amount of genocidal and antisemitic language, including references to the forged The Protocols of the Elders of Zion. In its charter, Hamas claimed that "the land of Palestine is an Islamic trust left to the generations of Moslems until the day of resurrection" and that "the solution to the Palestinian problem will only take place by holy war," rejecting all peace initiatives. The charter also claimed that "Israel will exist and will continue to exist until Islam will obliterate it" and that "The Day of Judgment will not come about until Muslims fight Jews and kill them."

=== Early agitation ===
Following the launch of its charter, Hamas positioned itself as an alternative to the PLO-affiliated Unified National Leadership of the Uprising (UNLU) and began agitating to take control over the direction of the Intifada from the UNLU, calling its own demonstrations and strike days. By May 1988, Hamas also began active campaigns to force women in Gaza to wear the hijab, including beginning to break into schools to attack schoolgirls who weren't wearing one.

At first, the organisation's success was limited, particularly as it framed its calls to action in heavily religious terms, divided its focus between confronting the Israeli occupation and confronting the nationalist movements in Palestine, and still carried stigma over the Israeli government's support for its growth. As the Intifada continued, however, with a harsh Israeli crackdown and the appearance of divisions between the PLO central leadership in exile in Tunisia and the UNLU, Hamas was able to sustain its position and increase its membership. In a September 1988 article, Ian Black of British newspaper The Guardian wrote that Hamas represented "an increasingly powerful opposition to those who seek to translate the sacrifices of the uprising into concrete political gains," opposing any concessions to Israel, and that "as the PLO has faced the challenge of matching months of sustained unrest with politically imaginative ideas, Hamas has become firmer in its views."

In mid-November 1988, the PLO's Palestinian National Council was convened in Algiers, Algeria, to draft and issue the Palestinian Declaration of Independence, establishing the State of Palestine as a government-in-exile and calling for peace negotiations based on the 1967 United Nations Security Council Resolution 242. The declaration was met with scepticism by the Israeli government, who also ordered a lockdown on the Palestinian Territories over the duration of the PNC conference, and received a positive, but muted response among Palestinians. Hamas would be one of the most prominent groups to speak out against the declaration, on the basis that it accepted the 1947 Partition of Palestine, describing it as a surrender. Later that month, as the first anniversary of the breakout of the Intifada approached and frustrations were growing among the Palestinian population over the continuing harsh Israeli crackdown, when the UNLU called for the date of the annual day of protests against the partition to be changed as a result of the declaration, Hamas called for protests to be held on the usual date in defiance of the UNLU. The call was largely followed and received support from the PLO hardliners, the Popular Front for the Liberation of Palestine (PFLP).

The Israeli government's support for the Muslim Brotherhood's network in Gaza continued during the first stages of the Intifada, even as the network re-organised itself into Hamas. According to Gil Sedan and Hugh Orgel of the Jewish Telegraphic Agency, during the first year and a half of the First Intifada, "the official attitude toward Hamas and its leadership has been more or less tolerant. Senior figures in the defence establishment have stated privately that two considerations supported the policy of encouraging Hamas' influence among the Palestinians. One was the notion that granting a firm public standing to the Islamic elements, even religious and political extremists, would offset the influence of violent groups, such as the Islamic Jihad. The other consideration was to strengthen the hand of PLO opponents within the Palestinian population." While the Israeli government refused to negotiate with the PLO, senior Israeli officials continued to hold meeting with senior Mujama al-Islamiya officials after it re-organised itself into Hamas, and while the Israel Broadcasting Authority refused to give air-time to nationalist Palestinian figures, it did air an interview with Yassin in September 1988. John Kifner of The New York Times wrote in September 1988 that "Israeli authorities have taken no direct action against Hamas despite repeated crackdowns and roundups" on UNLU and PLO factions, additionally quoting an anonymous Western diplomat as saying that "It certainly is remarkable with all these arrests, that someone like Sheik Ahmed Yassin, who just goes on saying the most awful things about Jews, isn't touched."

=== First terrorist attacks ===
In early 1989, Hamas would perpetrate its first attack, posing as ultra-orthodox Jews to abduct and kill Israeli soldier Sergeant Avi Sasportas in February, and then Corporal Ilan Saadoun in early May. Following the killing of Sasportas and Saadon, the Israeli government began to perceive Hamas as a more serious threat, carrying out a mass arrest of over two hundred Hamas members, including Yassin, in late May 1989, and cutting off all contacts with the organisation. In June 1989, the Israeli government formally designated Hamas as a terrorist organisation.

The Israeli crackdown at first significantly weakened Hamas as an organisation, with much of its leadership imprisoned and its internal security compromised. Following the crackdown, Hamas would undergo a re-organisation, notably more distinctly separating its political, social, and military branches. As part of the re-organisation, the Al-Qassam Brigades were founded as the official military branch of Hamas. The Brigades were publicly revealed in January 1992, after it carried out its first attack, murdering Doron Shoshan, the rabbi of the settlement of Kfar Darom. In its re-organisation, Hamas also adopted a clandestine cell system and established bases outside of the occupied territories.

In July 1989, Hamas began extending its campaign to impose the hijab on Palestinian women to the West Bank, with its first attacks on women on the street in East Jerusalem and Hebron. Another signifiant incident occurred in mid-1989 in Gaza City, where a group of Hamas activists chased two women who were wearing hijabs into a shop, claiming that their hijabs didn't completely cover their hair. Following these incidents, the UNLU would finally issue its first communiqué explicitly denouncing Hamas's campaigns to police women's dress.

=== Loss of direction of the Intifada and growing popularity ===
In August 1990, Saddam Hussein's Iraq invaded Kuwait. Despite nearly unanimous international condemnation, the PLO and many Palestinians declared their support for Hussein, partially out of hope that Iraq would be a powerful ally against Israel and that Hussein would tie any settlement of the occupation of Kuwait to the Israeli occupation of Palestine. During the Gulf War that followed, however, Hussein's forces were comprehensively defeated and a strict lockdown was placed on Palestine by the Israeli government, causing significant economic and political turmoil within Palestine. Hamas moved to take advantage of the situation, with The New York Times Magazine quoting one Palestinian analyst in July 1991 as saying that "The P.L.O. still represents the Palestinians politically, but Hamas increasingly reflects their despair." Hamas had also expressed stronger opposition to the Iraqi invasion than the PLO's leadership, prompting Gulf states to redirect funding for the PLO towards Hamas.

In December 1990, Hamas carried out a significant terrorist attack in Jaffa, murdering three Israeli civilians in an aluminium factory in the city.

Through 1991, the Intifada began to break down and Palestinian internal political violence increased significantly, notably with attacks against rumoured collaborators and with fighting between different Palestinian factions. In early June 1991, street fighting broke out between Hamas and PLO supporters in Nablus after a Hamas march through the city's centre was taunted by second-graders. Six Palestinian militants were injured in the fighting, including one who was stabbed five times by Hamas members as he lay on a hospital bed. In July 1991, Hamas supporters in Gaza City attempted to impose a curfew on Fatah supporters in the city, resulting in street fighting between the two factions and an attempt by Fatah supporters in the Jabalia Camp to impose a curfew on Hamas supporters in the camp in retaliation.

As disillusionment over the course of the Intifada grew among Palestinians, support for Hamas increased. In late June 1991, elections were held to the Hebron Chamber of Commerce, the first election to the Chamber since 1964. Of the eleven seats on the Chamber's board, six were won by Hamas sympathisers. As a result of Hamas's growing popularity, the PLO offered Hamas to join the Palestinian National Council in August 1991, however, the offer was rescinded after Hamas demanded at least 40% of the seats on the council and a guarantee that the council would not recognise the State of Israel.

According to the Federation of American Scientists's Intelligence Resource Program, 1992 saw "a considerable upsurge in violence carried out by the Islamic Resistance Movement (HAMAS)" and "intra-Palestinian violence in the occupied territories -- mostly between Fatah and HAMAS -- increased overall during 1992." In January 1991, Hamas murdered Israeli settler Doron Shoushan in Deir al-Balah. In March 1992, Hamas murdered 19-year-old Israeli civilian Ilanit Ohana and 41-year-old Arab citizen of Israel Abed al-Karim in a knife attack in Jaffa, injuring twenty other Israeli civilians, mostly schoolgirls gathered for Purim celebrations.

Later in March 1992, Hamas won overwhelming victories in the Ramallah Chamber of Commerce elections and the elections to the board of the Makassed Hospital. The victory followed a conflict between Hamas and the UNLU over the continuation of commercial strikes, with Hamas arguing for commercial strikes to be relaxed during Ramadan and the UNLU arguing for commercial strikes to continue as normal since the outbreak of the Intifada. In early April 1992, the UNLU would back down from the conflict, announcing the relaxation of commercial strikes, and the limiting of general strikes and boycotts of Israeli goods. Ehud Yaari of The Jerusalem Report wrote in May 1992 on Hamas's growing popularity that "the Palestinian 'street' sees the Islamic movement — which manages to combine fiery anti-Israel rhetoric with a cautious, restrained approach in its day-to-day Intifada activity — as being more attuned to its problems. Hamas, and its extended periphery of Muslim Brotherhood supporters, hit exactly on the public mood, both on the principle of no negotiations on autonomy (though they’ve taken no practical steps to stop them) and also in its readiness to reduce the burden the Intifada imposes on the populace... The public has welcomed Hamas leaflets toppling one prohibition after another. This explains why strikes called by Hamas have been widely respected, whereas more and more are violating PLO strikes each week."

In mid-May 1992, Hamas murdered Israeli civilian David Cohen as he was making a delivery to a slaughterhouse in Beit Lahia. In November 1992, Israeli intelligence forces prevented a major attempt by Hamas to set off car bombs in Tel Aviv.

=== December 1992 deportation and start of suicide bombings ===
In December 1992, Hamas would abduct and murder Nissim Toledano, an Israeli police officer. Following the murder, the Israeli government carried out a mass deportation of four hundred suspected Hamas members across the Lebanese border. The deportation, intended to eliminate Hamas as a security threat, backfired, with Hamas's profile being significantly raised and with Hamas forging its first links with Hezbollah, who provided the group with training and equipment.

In early January 1993, Hamas members carried out a new wave of terrorist attacks, including murdering Israeli intelligence officer Haim Nahmani in Jerusalem, a failed bombing of an civilian Egged bus, and the attempted murder of an Israeli civilian in Holon. In the following days, the Israeli security forces carried out an operation that resulted in the arrests of 22 further Hamas terrorists based in Hebron, who had murdered at least two Israelis and wounded several others in a string of terrorist attacks. Later in January, Hamas would be linked to another murder in Holon, killing Israeli sex worker Sarah Sharon.

In February 1993, the United States Department of State included Hamas in its annual report on global terrorism for the first time. Early 1993 also saw several controversies involving the United States and Hamas, including arrests of members of the Hamas front United Association for Studies and Research in Virginia headed by Mousa Abu Marzook, which was revealed to be laundering a significant amount of fundraising towards Hamas, as well as the admission by the Department of State that it had been secretly holding talks with Hamas for several years about "political Islam and the currents like that in the Islamic world."

By mid-February 1993, Gil Sedan of the Jewish Telegraphic Agency warned that "the stalemate in the peace process and the growing power of the anti-peace camp in the Palestinian society — led by the Moslem fundamentalist Hamas movement — have reignited the intifada, which last year seemed paralyzed. It is a more violent intifada, with armed gangs roaming almost freely in the remote neighborhoods of Gaza City, the dense refugee camps in the Gaza Strip and West Bank, and the windy alleys of the Nablus casbah."

In April 1993, Hamas would perpetrate the Mehola Junction bombing, the second suicide attack and first suicide bombing in the Israeli-Palestinian conflict, inspired by Hezbollah.

In early July 1993, Hamas attacked a civilian bus in Jerusalem during rush hour, killing two Israelis and wounding several others in a failed attempt to take the passengers hostage.

=== Opposition to peace negotiations ===
When Egyptian President Hosni Mubarak proposed a 10-point peace initiative based on elections in September 1989, to which Arafat had signalled potential agreement, Hamas came out in opposition. In its 47th leaflet, it accused Mubarak and other Arab states of "working on American orders to tame the Palestinian people." In its 51st leaflet, Hamas warned that any Palestinian that negotiated with Israel "will be regarded a traitor."

Hamas opposed the Madrid Conference of 1991, held in early November 1991. Instead, it sent a delegate to the Iranian government's International Conference on Supporting Palestine Intifada in Tehran that autumn. When Madrid Conference negotiators returned to Palestine to hold public forums, Hamas attempted to forcibly break up the forums. In the occupied territories, Hamas supporters protesting against the Madrid Conference clashed violently with PLO supporters demonstrating in support of the Conferefence, and issued threats to Palestinians who refused to take part in general strikes that it attempted to call against the Conference.

Hamas subsequently opposed the 1993 Oslo Accords, and refused to take part in the newly-formed Palestinian Authority. In the short-term, this opposition lead to a decrease in Hamas's popularity, as Palestinians inside the occupied territories broadly welcomed the Accords. In the long-term, however, according to Palestinian sociologist Jamil Hilal, Hamas "presented itself as the main opposition to the Oslo Accords and succeeded in becoming a major political (and armed) force with the failure of the Oslo Accords to lead to a sovereign Palestinian State with East Jerusalem as its capital."

== Roles of Hamas in the Intifada ==
=== Activities ===
During the First Intifada, Hamas routinely published leaflets describing its ideology and calling for Palestinians to take actions against Israel including strikes and demonstrations, often in contradiction to the UNLU's calls for action. According to British historian Martin Gilbert, Hamas "declared its own strike days. It punished Palestinians who did not follow its injunctions. It also set up its own social network to help the poor and the sick. Often it opposed strikes which had been called by Yasser Arafat and the PLO-dominated United National Command, because many traders who were Hamas supporters would have suffered. It also opposed the frequent calls for strikes in schools, for it attached importance to education."

In a 2017 study, Alon Burstein of the Hebrew University of Jerusalem found that Hamas leaflets during the First Intifada made more use of references to historical figures than Unified National Leadership of the Uprising leaflets, were more consistent who they identified as enemies and about their long-term vision for Palestine (particularly as the PLO shifted towards peace negotiations), and were "far more silent in the face of repression, with the only aspect accentuated as a result of repressive acts being the group's unique brand of religious-nationalism which Hamas framed as the collective's identity." Gilbert wrote that Hamas "associated itself with what it called the ‘chain of Jihad’, extending from the uprising against the British in Palestine in 1936 to the Jihad proclaimed by Islamic leaders after the United Nations partition resolution of 1947."

Hamas also used its previously-established network to continue to provide social services to Palestinians during the Intifada. According to American researcher Sara Roy, "the organization was greatly appreciated and valued by widening sectors of society for providing welfare and social services in an increasingly depleted environment. Hamas, its leadership, and its institutions were also renowned for their honesty, decency, and incorruptibility not only by the Palestinian street but also by international officials, who sometimes relied on Hamas — and, I was told, only Hamas — for the grassroots distribution of donor funds."

Hamas advocated for and used violence against Israelis and Jews, murdering a significant number of Israelis during the later years of the Intifada. According to Kali Robinson of the Council on Foreign Relations, "Hamas's purpose was to engage in violence against Israelis as a means of restoring Palestinian backing for the Brotherhood, which was losing political support to Palestinian Islamic Jihad, a Gaza-based, Iran-sponsored organization that had begun pursuing terrorist operations against Israel." Michael Curtis of Rutgers University noted that Hamas is "fundamentally antisemitic" and that, during the Intifada, it "urged Palestinians to kill Israeli soldiers or Jews, to burn Israeli forests and agricultural fields, and to escalate bloodshed."

Hamas also advocated for violence against Palestinians who opposed it, Palestinians who collaborated with Israel, and against Palestinians involved with recreational drug use and sex work. However, Hamas largely had yet to formulate a coherent military strategy.

=== Alternative nationalist vision ===
According to Alon Burstein of the Hebrew University of Jerusalem, Hamas presented itself as "the vanguard of a new Palestinian nationalism, expressing its identity through religion and calling for armed resistance against Israel and its replacement with an Islamic-Palestinian entity." According to Hani Awad of the Arab Center for Research and Policy Studies, the First Intifada saw "the newfound division of the political field between two major ideological forces whose understanding of the conflict with Israel was based on very different sets of principles," the first being the PLO with a veteran core and a statist nationalist ideology, and the second being Hamas, with a more inexperienced core and an ideology based on religious conflict. Awad further wrote that Hamas also presented a new national narrative during the Intifada, presenting Palestinian history through religious terms, particularly in contrast to the Israeli establishment's presentation of its own national narrative in Jewish terms.

=== Gender ===
In a 1991 article in The New York Times, Sabra Chartrand stated that there had been a significant increase in women wearing hijabs since the start of the First Intifada, particularly in the Gaza Strip, with many Palestinians having "adopted Islam and its rituals as a focus for the Palestinian cause, a source of ethnic pride and an alternative to the failures of secular political movements" even as "people close to events in Gaza say Palestinians here have not become more religious." In a 1990 article for the Middle East Research and Information Project, Rema Hammami noted that, prior to the Intifada, the Mujamma "sought to impose or, as they saw it, 'restore' the hijab on women in Gaza who were not wearing any form of headcovering - mainly educated, urban, and petit bourgeois women. The Mujama' endowed the hijab with new meanings of piety and political affiliation." Hammai added that, after the outbreak of the Intifada, "this social pressure transformed into an active campaign to impose the hijab on all women. By December 1988, one year after the intifada erupted, it was almost impossible for women to walk around Gaza without wearing some form of headcover... If there were no soldiers to throw stones at, women without headscarves made good targets. Politically unaffiliated shabab who felt left out found harassing these women a safe way to express nationalist sentiment. Simultaneously, soldiers were raiding homes and attacking women; families became worried about their daughters, and husbands about their wives."

=== Alternative to the PLO ===
The outbreak of the First Intifada was largely spontaneous, and the uprising would be led by the grassroots organisations affiliated with the PLO, such as labour unions, student councils, and women's committees, who organised themselves together in the form of the Unified National Leadership of the Uprising. The central leadership of the PLO, who had mostly been exiled, imprisoned, or killed by 1987, played a relatively minor role in coordinating the Intifada. However, the PLO leadership regularly attempted to assert authority over the UNLU, largely succeeding by the later stages of the uprising. In this context, Hamas emerged as group that was entirely unaffiliated to the PLO, operating independently of the UNLU and often in opposition to the UNLU.

According to Beverley Milton-Edwards and Stephen Farrell, "Hamas was preoccupied not with long-term issues, but with challenging the PLO for control of the Intifada," including instigating clashes with PLO supporters. According to Khalid Farraj, a prominent Birzeit University student organiser of the Intifada, divisions grew significantly between Palestinian nationalist factions during the later stages of the Intifada, and "primary among the factors that deepened the rift was the meteoric rise of local Islamist movements, and particularly Hamas, which was staunchly opposed to the political process and committed to the armed struggle. The movement made huge inroads among the population during the intifada, and Hamas activists followed the directives of their own leadership — which were issued monthly — rather than abiding by UNLU directives."

According to Jean-Pierre Filiu of Sciences Po, "the relationship within the PLO between the leadership — exiled first in Jordan, then in Lebanon, and finally in Tunis — and the nationalists in the Gaza Strip (and to a lesser extent the West Bank) [has] been a complicated one. By contrast, because the Muslim Brotherhood of Gaza had hunkered down and consolidated its entrenchment in the Strip during the first two decades of the Israeli occupation, this tension between the 'outside' and the 'inside' has not been an issue for them." According to Francesco Saverio Leopardi of the University of Edinburgh, "the emergence of the Islamist camp represented a challenging development for the whole PLO since, for the first time, a genuinely Palestinian movement outside its framework gained increased popularity and legitimacy among the population."

=== Growth in membership ===
American researcher Sara Roy has written that, according to Hamas co-founder Ismail Abu Shanab, during the Intifada, a significant number of Palestinians "joined Hamas who had not been fully active or engaged MB members and therefore did not possess the requisite ideological understanding or commitment to the movement; others introduced new ideas (both Islamist and non-Islamist) through their experiences abroad. Abu Shanab, who himself had received his PhD in the United States, argued that this mixture of individuals and perspectives contributed greatly to Hamas’s pragmatism and flexibility, allowing the movement to appeal to a wider popular constituency."

=== Relations with the PFLP ===
Prior to the breakout of the Intifada, the Brotherhood's network in the Gaza Strip had targeted the communist Popular Front for the Liberation of Palestine (PFLP) with vandalism. Mutual dislike between Hamas and the PFLP continued during the first year of the Intifada, with PFLP deputy leader Abu Ali Mustafa criticising Hamas in an October 1988 interview for acting outside of the UNLU and accusing Hamas of having held secret meetings with the Israeli government.

As Hamas grew, however, and the Intifada failed to secure concrete political gains for Palestinians, the PFLP shifted towards trying to co-opt Hamas's popularity, including adopting increasing Islamic references in its rhetoric. In a May 1990 article for The New York Times, journalist Alan Cowell quoted a West Bank resident as saying that "the tendency is for Hamas and the Popular Front to try to capitalize on frustration with joint calls for more radical actions, more strikes, more stones." In a May 1992 article for The Jerusalem Report, Ehud Yaari noted that "the constant public courting of Hamas by the radical Popular Front for the Liberation of Palestine is tantamount to its having been declared kosher by the most doctrinaire faction in the PLO establishment."

== Aftermath ==
Academic Mustafa Fetouri wrote that, while "Hamas did not play a significant role in the First Intifada compared to well-established other Palestinian movements," its rise during the Intifada allowed it to subsequently claim a reputation of being "the beacon of grassroots resistance" to the Israeli occupation. According to Francesco Saverio Leopardi of the University of Edinburgh, Hamas emerged during the Intifada as "the new radical opponents to the moderate Fatah's leadership within the wider Palestinian national movement, a role attributed historically to the PFLP." According to Ziad Abu-Amr of Birzeit University, the Intifada gave the Muslim Brotherhood "an opportunity to establish its nationalist credentials, which were questionable until the uprising."

Hamas would continue to grow and perpetrate terror attacks through the 1990s, and would become the most prominent Palestinian faction in the Second Intifada, which would be significantly more violent and militarised than the First.
