= Israeli support for Hamas =

The Israeli government has been involved in assisting or empowering the Palestinian political and military organization Hamas at various points in its history. (Note: Attributed to multiple sources:) This support continued during and in spite of active military hostilities between the two sides.

During the 1970s, Israel began providing support to Ahmed Yassin, a Palestinian Muslim Brotherhood leader who controlled a network of Islamic schools, mosques, and clubs, in order to weaken the secular nationalist Palestine Liberation Organization. It continued to encourage the expansion of Yassin's network during the first year and a half of the First Intifada, as the network re-organised into Hamas. This support lasted until 1989, when Hamas launched its first attacks on Israelis, leading to a significant crackdown against the organisation. Multiple Israeli officials have acknowledged Israel's role in strengthening Yassin's network.

In the late 2010s and early 2020s, Israeli officials encouraged Qatar to support Hamas, especially by approving the transfer of large sums of financial aid by Qatar to the organization. Several Israeli intelligence officials have cited Qatari money as a contributing factor to the success of Hamas in leading the October 7 attacks in 2023; Israeli prime minister Benjamin Netanyahu has called the notion that Israel strategically propped up Hamas "ridiculous", and stated that Qatar's aid transfers to the Hamas government had been approved for humanitarian reasons.

In her 1996 book Islamic Politics in Palestine, Beverley Milton-Edwards, former Professor of Politics at Queen's University Belfast, observed that Israeli financial and policy support for Islamic organizations—particularly al-Mujama al-Islami in Gaza—served as a classic "divide-and-rule" strategy. By encouraging conservative Islamic movements as a counterweight to the secular Palestine Liberation Organization (PLO), Israeli authorities sought to weaken progressive nationalist appeals; however, turning a blind eye to these activities ultimately nurtured a movement that later turned against its benefactor.

== History ==
=== 1970s–1980s ===
During the 1970s and 1980s, one of the Israeli government's main goals in the Israeli–Palestinian conflict was the defeat of the secular and leftist Palestine Liberation Organisation (PLO), including through military actions such as the 1982 Israeli invasion of Lebanon. Internationally, the Israeli government aimed to contain the influence of Arab nationalist and Arab socialist governments, such as by the French-British invasion of Egypt during the mid-1950s Suez Canal Crisis, to the royalists in the 1960s North Yemen civil war, and to the Islamic Republic of Iran during the 1980s Iran–Iraq war. It also refused to negotiate with the PLO, instead carrying out any negotiations over the future of the occupied Palestinian territories via Arab state intermediaries, especially Jordan, and Egypt following the late 1970s Camp David Accords. Within the occupied territories, the Israeli government took a range of measures to repress Palestinian nationalism and suppress PLO-linked movements, including banning the National Guidance Committee and the dismissing elected Palestinian city councils. It also sought to encourage the growth of conservative and religious groups, which were frequently hostile to the PLO and assumed to be more cooperative with Israeli officials. The most prominent of these groups was the Palestinian Village Leagues.

Another conservative, religious, and anti-PLO movement that was encouraged by Israeli officials was that of Islamist politician Ahmed Yassin, a Muslim Brotherhood member who ran a network of mosques, clubs, and schools in the Gaza Strip through his Mujama al-Islamiya charity. During the 1970s and 1980s, Israel granted licences and support to Yassin so that he could build and expand his network. American research Jonathan Schanzer wrote that "by the late 1970s, the Israelis believed that they had found Fatah's Achilles' heel ... Fatah had become anxious over the growing influence of the Muslim Brotherhood in Gaza," saying that the Israelis subsequently "made the ill-fated decision to permit the Brotherhood to operate with relatively little oversight" so that it would undermine the Palestine Liberation Organization (PLO).

Israeli Brigadier General Yitzhak Segev, who served as the Israeli military governor in Gaza during the early 1980s, admitted to providing financial assistance to Mujama al-Islamiya, the precursor of Hamas, on the instruction of the Israeli authorities. In March 1981, Segev told The New York Times that "the Israeli Government gave me a budget and the military government gives to the mosques." Other former Israeli officials have also openly acknowledged Israel's role in providing funding and assistance to Yassin's network as a means of undermining the secular, left-wing Palestinian factions that made up the PLO. Former Israeli Civil Administration director Efraim Sneh stated in 1992 that "we saw the fundamentalists mainly as an unthreatening social force aiming to improve the bad conditions and standards of living of the Palestinians ... We know now that we must make a distinction between Hamas, with whom we have nothing in common, and the moderates, mainstream secular elements among the Palestinians." In 2018, historian Uri Milstein quoted Yitzhak Mordechai, who served as head of the Southern Command from 1986 to 1989, as saying that "I was very familiar with Gaza from my previous positions. But when I took charge of the Southern Command, I was shocked by the number of mosques that had been recently constructed in Gaza. As it turned out, Israel’s strategists had been supportive of Sheikh Ahmed Yassin’s charitable organization."

Several incidents occurred during the 1980s after which leftist Palestinians accused the Israeli government of supporting Islamist fundamentalists. One such incident was the January 1980 Mujama al-Islamiya riot, after which the Palestine Red Crescent Society accused the Israeli military of "complicity" in the riot. Another was the conflict between Mujama al-Islamiya and the PLO for control over the Islamic University of Gaza. In February 1981, seven of the thirteen members of the university's senate were fired by the Israeli Military Governorate, allegedly at Mujama al-Islamiya's request.

=== First Intifada (1987–1989) ===
After the outbreak of the First Intifada in 1987, Yassin's network re-organised itself into an armed organisation: Hamas, issuing an extremist founding charter in 1988. However, until Hamas carried out its first attacks in the spring of 1989, the Israeli government continued to encourage its growth. John Kifner of The New York Times wrote in September 1988 that "Israeli authorities have taken no direct action against Hamas despite repeated crackdowns and roundups" on Unified National Leadership of the Uprising and PLO factions, quoting an anonymous Western diplomat as saying that "It certainly is remarkable with all these arrests, that someone like Sheik Ahmed Yassin, who just goes on saying the most awful things about Jews, isn't touched." In May 1989, Gil Sedan and Hugh Orgel of the Jewish Telegraphic Agency wrote that, during the first year and a half of the First Intifada, "the official attitude toward Hamas and its leadership has been more or less tolerant. Senior figures in the defence establishment have stated privately that two considerations supported the policy of encouraging Hamas' influence among the Palestinians. One was the notion that granting a firm public standing to the Islamic elements, even religious and political extremists, would offset the influence of violent groups, such as the Islamic Jihad. The other consideration was to strengthen the hand of PLO opponents within the Palestinian population."

This support lasted until 1989, when Hamas launched its first attacks on Israelis, leading to a significant crackdown against the organisation.

=== Oslo era (1993–2010s) ===
After a visit to Israel from Turkish Prime Minister Mesut Yilmaz and Turkish lawmaker Feyzi İşbaşaran in 1998, İşbaşaran later revealed that Netanyahu suggested Turkey support Hamas. Netanyahu reportedly said, "Hamas also has bank accounts for aid in banks, we help them too, you [Turkey] can help too."

In a cable leaked by WikiLeaks in 2010, Amos Yadlin, former general of the Israeli Air Force and then head of Military Intelligence, said in 2007 that Israel would be "happy" if Hamas took over Gaza and regarded it as a positive step, "because the IDF could then deal with Gaza as a hostile state." An Israeli financial investigative team called "Task Force Harpoon" in 2015 discovered a network of businesses and investments that were owned and controlled by Hamas. The terrorism finance task force briefed the government, but no actions were taken in either Israel or Washington until seven years later.

In an exclusive interview published by Ynetnews on May 7, 2008, then-Defense Minister Ehud Barak reflected on historical missteps in regional policy, stating: "I hate to remind you that 20 years ago we supported the induction of Hamas, that we marched into Lebanon to the sounds of the Lebanese people cheering and it was our being there that created Hizbullah."

=== Qatari financial transfers (2018–2023) ===
In a May 2024 interview with MBC Masr, Mousa Abu Marzouk, Head of Hamas’ Foreign Relations Office, stated that the organization’s presence in Doha was established at the request of the United States following a rift between Hamas leadership and Jordanian authorities.

According to a March 2019 report by The Jerusalem Post, Prime Minister Benjamin Netanyahu defended his decision to permit financial transfers into Gaza during a private Likud faction meeting, framing the policy as part of a broader strategy to maintain a political separation between Hamas and the Palestinian Authority. Netanyahu argued that “whoever is against a Palestinian state should be for” transferring the funds to Gaza, asserting that preserving the division between the West Bank and Gaza serves to impede the establishment of a Palestinian state. Yossi Kuperwasser, an Israeli intelligence and security expert, said that Qatari's support for Hamas could help deter the group from war by improving life in Gaza. Kuperwasser stated in 2015: "We believe that better conditions in Gaza would lessen the incentive of Hamas and the population to go again to a war. So in a way, it is helping the deterrence. But the purpose is to improve the conditions of the people of Gaza and enable them to live a respectable life."

Qatar started sending money to the Gaza Strip on a monthly basis in 2018. $15 million worth of cash-filled suitcases were transported into Gaza by the Qataris via Israeli territory. The payments commenced due to the 2017 decision by the Palestinian Authority (PA), an administration in the Israeli-occupied West Bank and rival to Hamas, to cut government employee salaries in Gaza. At the time, the PA objected to the funds, which Hamas said was intended for both medical and governmental salary payments. In August 2018, Israel's government approved the agreement. In a February 2024 report published by the BBC, Udi Levy, former Head of Mossad's Economic Warfare Division, noted, "The Qataris [had] a special envoy that came every month, with a private jet to Rafah with a suitcase, enter to Gaza, gave it to Hamas, say hello and go back, that's it." He further emphasized that "'a significant sum of this money' went to 'support Hamas's military arm.'" That same year, Meir Ben-Shabbat, the then National Security Advisor, received a note in Hebrew written by Yahya Sinwar, the leader of Hamas in the Gaza Strip, addressed to Netanyahu, titled "Calculated risk." The note was part of a broader strategy by Sinwar to portray Hamas as open to a long-term truce and also referring to Israel's agreement with Qatar to allow Qatari aid to enter to Gaza in order to pay civil servants, as well as to families in need.

In February 2020, former Mossad Director Yossi Cohen and Israeli general Herzi Halevi, under Netanyahu's orders, went to Qatar to plead Qatari officials to continue the payments for Hamas. Later, in September 2023, David Barnea, the Director of Mossad since 2021, went to Qatar to meet Qatari officials to discuss about the payments for Hamas. Israeli Prime Minister Benjamin Netanyahu has defended allowing transfer of millions of dollars to Hamas-run Gaza despite criticism from within his own government, including the education minister Naftali Bennett. Netanyahu stated, "I'm doing what I can, in coordination with the security establishment, to return quiet to the southern communities, but also to prevent a humanitarian crisis." Characterizing the policy as a deliberate, security-backed strategy, Netanyahu added, "We held serious discussions, I think we're acting in a responsible and wise way. At this time, this is the right step." After the October 7 attacks, Netanyahu went on record denying the claims that he facilitated financing of Hamas in order to create a 'divide and conquer' situation. He also said that he transferred funds to avoid "humanitarian collapse" in Gaza. Israeli intelligence officials believe that the money had a role in the success of 2023 Hamas-led attack. Talks regarding expanding the amount of work permits Israel issued to Gazan laborers also included officials from Hamas. This kept money flowing into Gaza.

In an April 2024 interview with Haaretz, Majed Al-Ansari—Advisor to the Prime Minister of Qatar and Official Spokesperson for the Ministry of Foreign Affairs of the State of Qatar—addressed criticism regarding Doha's ties to Hamas, stating, “We did not enter into a relationship with Hamas because we wanted to. We were asked by the U.S. We reviewed that request in 2006.” He rejected allegations of unilateral financial support, noting, “If you are going to attack Qatar by saying that Qatar funded Hamas – our partner in this funding was the Israeli government.” Furthermore, Al-Ansari emphasized that Israeli leadership actively encouraged these financial transfers, adding, “As a matter of fact, we were asked to increase that aid, and on a number of times, we were asked to continue that aid when we were reconsidering providing aid to Gaza by the Israeli government.”

In a December 2024 interview with Sky News, Qatari Prime Minister Mohammed bin Abdulrahman Al Thani addressed international scrutiny regarding the diplomatic office hosted in his country, clarifying that “Hamas’ presence in Doha happened with full transparency and coordination, and at the request of the U.S. and Israel.”

== Debates ==
=== Use of Hamas to undermine the Palestinian Authority ===
In an interview with Israeli journalist, Dan Margalit in December 2012, Netanyahu told Margalit that it was important to keep Hamas strong, as a counterweight to the Palestinian Authority in the West Bank. Netanyahu also added that having two strong rivals, this would lessen pressure on him to negotiate towards a Palestinian state. In an interview with the Israeli Army Radio in August 2019, Ehud Barak, the former Prime Minister of Israel from 1999 to 2001, said that Netanyahu's main strategy is to keep Hamas "alive and kicking" in order to weaken the Palestinian Authority, even at the expense of "abandoning the citizens [of the south]." In a March 2024 interview with ABC News, journalist John Lyons asked former Israeli Prime Minister Ehud Barak, “So, are you saying that Benjamin Netanyahu deliberately boosted Hamas to try to prevent a Palestinian state?” Barak concurred with the assessment, responding, “Yeah, sure, he deliberately and systematically, even told, is on record, whoever wants to avoid the threat of a two-state solution, has to support my policy of paying protection money to the Hamas.”

In an interview with Politico in 2023, former Israeli Prime Minister Ehud Olmert said, "In the last 15 years, Israel did everything to downgrade the Palestinian Authority and to boost Hamas", before adding that "Gaza was on the brink of collapse because they had no resources, they had no money, and the PA refused to give Hamas any money. Bibi saved them. Bibi made a deal with Qatar and they started to move millions and millions of dollars to Gaza." In an April 2024 interview with Zeteo, Olmert stated, "The fact is that Netanyahu, as I say time and again, many many many years before the October 7th, he released more than a thousand Hamas murderers, on top of them Yahya Al Sinwar, who turned out to become, afterwards, the leader of Hamas, and the commander of the troops operation, which was committed on the 7th of October."

At a Likud party conference in 2019, Netanyahu said: "Anyone who wants to thwart the establishment of a Palestinian state has to support bolstering Hamas and transferring money to Hamas ... This is part of our strategy – to isolate the Palestinians in Gaza from the Palestinians in the West Bank." Netanyahu responded to the accusations of funding and strengthening Hamas by calling them "ridiculous". In an interview with Time in 2024, he denied of giving support to Hamas and said that it was one of "many misquotes" attributed to him.

Gershon Hacohen, former commander of the 7th Armored Brigade and an associate of Netanyahu, said in 2019 in an interview: "Netanyahu's strategy is to prevent the option of two states, so he is turning Hamas into his closest partner. Openly Hamas is an enemy. Covertly, it's an ally." In an August 2015 interview with The Times of Israel, Hacohen expressed a strategic preference for Hamas over Palestinian Authority President Mahmoud Abbas, stating, “I prefer Hamas to Abu Mazen.” Hacohen argued that Hamas covertly serves as “an ally” by preventing a two-state solution, adding that “neither it nor I want a final solution.” In an October 2015 interview on the Knesset Channel, Bezalel Smotrich—who would later become Israel’s Finance Minister—argued that the Palestinian Authority posed a greater challenge to Israel than Hamas, stating, “The Palestinian Authority is a burden, and Hamas is an asset, it’s a terrorist organization, no one will recognize it, no one will give it status at the ICC, no one will let it put forth a resolution at the U.N. Security Council.”

In an interview with i24NEWS Français, former Israeli Ambassador to the EU and Germany Avi Primor explicitly acknowledged Israel's role in the Hamas' early origins, stating, "It was the Israeli government, it was us who created Hamas, in order to create a counterweight to Fatah at the time." He further explained that Israeli leadership originally anticipated "it would be a religious organization that would quarrel with Fatah" rather than the militant movement it eventually became, concluding that "we couldn't foresee what would become of it, but it's our creation, these are the facts."

In a May 2019 Facebook post, then-Knesset member Galit Distel-Atbaryan, criticized Netanyahu’s strategic approach toward Gaza, framing it as a deliberate effort to block Palestinian statehood: "Netanyahu wants Hamas on its feet... If Hamas collapses, Abu Mazen [Mahmoud Abbas] may control the strip. If he controls it, there will be voices from the left that will encourage negotiations and a political solution and a Palestinian state, also in Judea and Samaria [the West Bank]... This is the real reason why Netanyahu does not eliminate the Hamas leader, everything else is bullshit.

In a March 2024 interview on ABC News (Australia), former Shin Bet Director Ami Ayalon stated that Israeli policy used Qatari money transfers and local work permits to strengthen Hamas's control in Gaza to rival the Palestinian Authority in the West Bank.

In a June 2025 interview with Keshet 12, former Israeli Defense Minister Avigdor Lieberman criticized the government's distribution of arms to Gazan clans with alleged Salafist links: “Netanyahu, just as he once tried to build a counterweight to the Palestinian Authority with Hamas, now he is building up ISIS as a counterweight to Hamas inside the Gaza Strip.”

In a December 2023 report published by The New York Times, Brig. Gen. Yossi Kuperwasser—former Head of the Research Division in IDF Military Intelligence—explained the strategic rationale behind Israel's approach toward Gaza, stating, “The logic of Israel was that Hamas should be strong enough to rule Gaza, but weak enough to be deterred by Israel.”

=== Allegations regarding the creation of Hamas ===
Yuval Diskin, former director of Shin Bet from 2005 to 2011, told Israeli newspaper Yedioth Ahronoth in 2013, that "if we look at it over the years, one of the main people contributing to Hamas's strengthening has been Bibi (Benjamin) Netanyahu, since his first term as prime minister." In October 2023, former Intelligence Chief of Saudi Arabia, Prince Turki Al-Faisal, accused Israel of "funnelling Qatari money" to Hamas.

On 19 January 2024, Reuters reported that Josep Borrell, the EU foreign policy chief, said while receiving an honorary doctorate from the University of Valladolid that "Israel had financed the creation of Palestinian militant group Hamas, publicly contradicting Prime Minister Benjamin Netanyahu who has denied such allegations." and that "Borrell added the only peaceful solution included the creation of a Palestinian state. 'We only believe a two-state solution imposed from the outside would bring peace even though Israel insists on the negative,' he said." Borrell also described Israel as having "created Hamas", but immediately continued saying that "yes, Hamas was financed by Israel to weaken the Palestinian Authority". (Note: Sources:)

Professor Avner Cohen publicly acknowledged that "Hamas, to my great regret, is Israel's creation" and that Israel had "encouraged them as a counterweight to ... [the] Palestine Liberation Organization and its dominant faction, Yasser Arafat's Fatah," while warning that efforts must be made "to break up this monster before this reality jumps in our face." David Hacham, who worked in Gaza as an Arab affairs expert in the Israeli military in the late 1980s and early 1990s, characterized the 1979 decision to recognize Sheikh Yassin’s association as Israel's "original sin," stating, "When I look back at the chain of events, I think we made a mistake. But at the time, nobody thought about the possible results." Similar statements have been made by Yasser Arafat. For example, in an interview with Italian newspaper Corriere della Sera in December 2001, he referred to Hamas as a "creature of Israel."

Shlomo Brom, retired general and former deputy to Israel's national security adviser, believes that an empowered Hamas helps Israeli Prime Minister Netanyahu avoid negotiating over a Palestinian state by claiming that Israel has no viable partner for peace talks.

== See also ==
- Divide and conquer
- Blowback (intelligence)
- Foreign relations of Hamas
- History of Hamas
- Operation Cyclone, US aid to Afghan mujahideen.
- Popular Forces
