= 1980s Islamist-nationalist conflict in Palestinian universities =

Between the late 1970s and the outbreak of the First Intifada in December 1987, Palestinian universities experienced significant conflict between Islamist factions, primarily linked to the Muslim Brotherhood and the Palestinian Islamic Jihad, and nationalist and leftist factions, primarily linked to the Palestine Liberation Organisation.

According to Reuven Paz of the Interdisciplinary Center Herzliya, during this period, "educational institutions proved a major battleground in the struggle between religious and secular-minded Palestinians to shape the character of Palestinian society, and eventually, a future Palestinian state." According to Amal Jamal of Tel Aviv University, "student political action had a confrontational, reactionary, and often violent nature in the early 1980s... The divisions were sharp and the confrontations often heated."

== An-Najah National University ==
1981 saw the start of a significant wave of conflict between nationalists and Islamists at An-Najah National University that lasted into 1982. Ziad Abu Amr described an incident on 9 January 1982: "more than twenty-five persons were injured... During this clash, Muhammad Hassan Sawalha, a lecturer at the university known for his sympathy for the nationalists, was thrown from the third floor of a university building and suffered serious injuries."

The university would see another significant wave of conflict between nationalists and Islamists in Autumn 1987, during which the university administration suspended classes for two months in an attempt to decrease tensions. According to Penny Johnson of the Journal of Palestine Studies, the Autumn 1987 conflict was one of the most discussed events in higher education covered in local media in the mid-1980s.

== Birzeit University ==
The first significant entry of the Islamist movement into Birzeit University came in the student elections in late 1979. Occurring in a context shortly after the Iranian Revolution, an Islamist slate was formed to compete in the elections and won 43% of the vote.

Richard Hecht and Roger Friedland described one incident at Birzeit in June 1983, where nationalist students prepared a demonstration to mark the one-year anniversary of the 1982 Israeli invasion of Lebanon: "the event ended in a brawl, with nationalists and Islamicists using fists, knives, and chains against each other. As the Brothers fled into the adjacent Christian village, they were set upon by its residents as well. According to the pro-PLO students, squads of Muslim Brothers had been sent from the Islamic University of Gaza to break up the anniversasry. For their part, the Muslim students claimed not only that the nationalists had prevented them from holding their own demonstration, but that Birzeit University was particularly hostile to Muslim students, colluding with the nationalists out of 'Phalangist hatred'... The following fall, Muslim students drove an automobile right through the university cafeteria's wall, followed by a phalanx of Islamic militants who attacked PLO supporters with rods and knives."

== Islamic University of Gaza ==
In February 1981, the Israeli Military Governorate summoned seven of the thirteen members of the university's senate to a meeting, allegedly at the request of the Mujama al-Islamiya. During the meeting, all seven members, who were pro-Fatah, were forced to resign.

According to Israeli researchers Shaul Mishal and Avraham Sela, Mujama al-Islamiya sought to wage "an 'internal jihad' to impose the rules of Islam on the society." Following its takeover of the university, Mujama al-Islamiya would appoint its own supporters to faculty positions and would enforce a strict conservative code of conduct on students and staff, including segregation of men and women, imposition of an Islamist dress code, as well as beatings and public humiliations of nationalist and leftist supporters. Mujama al-Islamiya also began to use the campus grounds as a location to store handheld weapons which it planned to use against leftist Palestinians.

According to Israeli researcher Barry Rubin, by the mid-1980s, the Islamic University had become the only Palestinian university in which Fatah was "a marginal force." In the January 1983 student elections, the Islamist bloc won 51% of the vote. In 1986, the Islamist bloc won over 60% of the vote.

In June 1983, coinciding with the clash at Birzeit University, a major clash erupted between Islamist and nationalist students at the Islamic University. Over 200 students were injured during the fighting.

According to Israeli researchers Shaul Mishal and Avraham Sela, "the Mujamma's efforts to deepen its influence through lawful institutionalisation peaked with its successful takeover of the Islamic University in Gaza." According to Israeli researcher Barry Rubin, the conflict over the university was "the main feature" of the politicisation of Mujama al-Islamiya during the late 1970s, with "almost every key leader in Hamas subsequently" having passed through the university. According to Francesco Saverio Leopardi of Ca' Foscari University of Venice, the takover of the university "laid the foundations for broad, youthful popular support [for Mujama al-Islamiya] in Gaza."

== See also ==
- January 1980 Mujama al-Islamiya riot
- Fatah–Hamas conflict
