= Al-Arkam School =

School in Gaza City, Gaza Strip, Palestine

Coordinates: 31.5403°N 34.482300°E

Al-Arkam school (Arabic: مدرسة دار الأرقم) is a school in Gaza City, Palestine which was established by Hamas leader Sheikh Ahmed Yassin. In September 2005, it was partially destroyed in an airstrike carried out by Israel.
