= Jacob Landau (academic) =

Israeli political scientist (1924–2020)

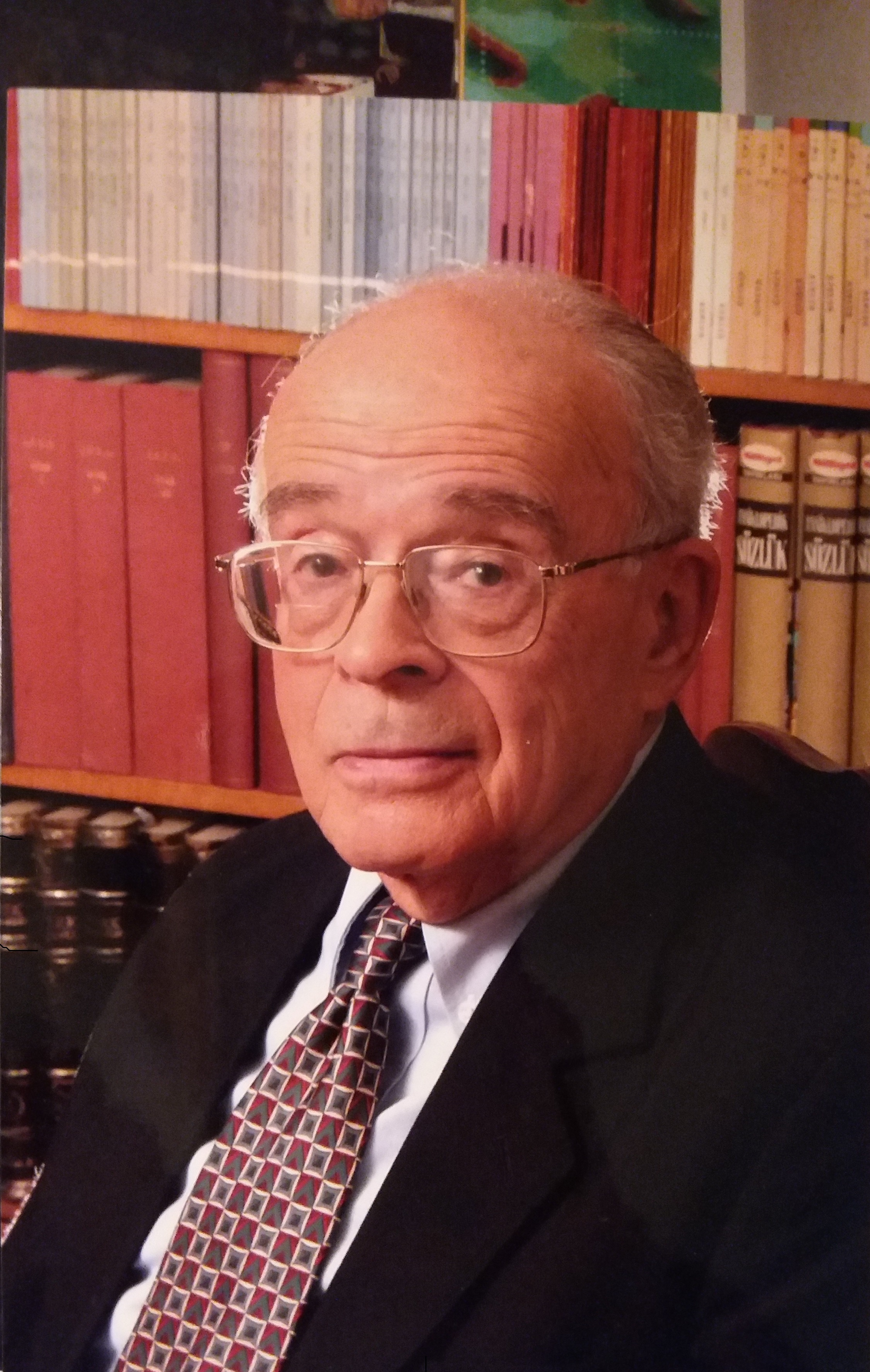
- Jacob M. Landau, 2005
- Born: 20 March 1924; Kishinev
- Died: 12 November 2020 (aged 96); Jerusalem

Academic background
- Education: Hebrew University of Jerusalem (B.A & M.A) School of Oriental and African Studies (PhD)
- Thesis: Parliamentary institutions and political parties in Egypt, 1866-1924 (1949)

Jacob M. Landau (20 March 1924 – 12 November 2020) was Professor Emeritus in the Department of Political Science (in the field of Middle Eastern Studies) at the Hebrew University of Jerusalem. As prolific scholar, he authored 24 books, edited 12, and wrote around 600 scholarly articles and books reviews.

== Biography ==
Landau was born on 20 March 1924 in Kishinev, Bessarabia (modern Moldova), which he left in 1935, moving to Palestine with his parents, Miriam and Michael Landau. His father was a lawyer who served in the Romanian parliament, from 1928 to 1933. They lived in a multilingual society; Romanian was the language used in school, Russian was spoken on the street while French and German were spoken at home. They settled in Tel Aviv, where he studied at the Herzliya Gymnasium, ending his school career in 1942. At the gymnasium he became fluent in Hebrew and knowledgeable of English and Arabic. He took his B.A. and M.A. in 1942–1946 at the Hebrew University of Jerusalem in history and Arabic studies. His M.A. thesis researched the nationalist movement in modern Egypt. It was supervised by Professor Richard Michael Koebner. For his Ph.D. studies he went to the School of Oriental and African Studies in London. His Ph.D. dissertation there was on parliaments and parties in Egypt (published in book form in 1953). His supervisor was Professor Bernard Lewis.

Returning to Israel in 1949, he first taught history and the Arabic language at the Hebrew University's experimental high school from 1949 to 1955, with a break from 1951 to 1953 to serve in the Israeli army. In 1955 he was invited by professor Simon Rawidowicz of Brandeis University to teach modern Middle East history and Arabic for one year. During this time he took up a post-doctoral fellowship at Harvard University with Professor H. A. R. Gibb in 1955–1956.

== Academic career ==
In 1958 he joined the Hebrew University's department of political science as a full-time lecturer until 1992 when he left as a full professor emeritus - the Professor of Political Science on the Gersten Chair. During those years he also served as a part-time professor of political science at Bar-Ilan University in Ramat-Gan, in addition to the Hebrew University, from 1960 to 1968. He also served as visiting professor at foreign universities in the United States, the United Kingdom, France, Germany, the Netherlands and Turkey.

Landau was one of the founders of the Israel Oriental Society in 1949 and served as its first secretary. Member of the Israel Association of Political Science and its president and editor of its journal from 1993 to 1998. He was also member of the Centre International des Etudes Pré-Ottomanes et Ottomanes (Paris), honorary member of the Turkish Historical Society (Ankara) and others. He was a member of the editorial board of several journals and of the central editorial committee of the Encyclopedia Judaica, 2nd edition. He was also the director of research at the Ben-Zvi Institute (1971-73), president of the Israeli Association of Political Science (1985-87), and members of the editorial boards of other publications in and outside Israel. He was a member of the Middle East Studies Association of North America.

== Awards and recognition ==
He was awarded the Ben-Zvi Memorial Prize by the Ben-Zvi Institute (Jerusalem, 1969), Itzhak Gruenbaum Memorial Award by the World Jewish Congress (Jerusalem, 1974), and the Bosphorus University Medal for distinguished research (Istanbul, 1981), the Israel Award in 2005 and the Annuel Scholar's Prize by the Arminius Vambery Association for Turcological Studies in Budapest.

== Research ==
Landau's main themes of research are Ottoman and Middle Eastern ideologies and nationalist movements, political radicalism, minorities, pan-Islam, pan-Turkism, politics and language in Central Asia. His published works are 23 books (selected list below). He has also edited 12 books and has written numerous book-reviews in specialized journals and various encyclopedias. His books and articles were published in ten different languages: Hebrew, Arabic, Turkish, English, French, German, Greek, Italian, Russian and Chinese (see his Bibliography of Published Works, 2015).

== Published works ==
1. Parliaments and Parties in Egypt. Jerusalem: The Israel Oriental Society, 1953. Second edition, New York: Praeger, 1954. Also in Arabic, Cairo and Beirut: 1975.
2. Studies in the Arab Theater. Philadelphia: University of Pennsylvania Press, 1958. Also in French, Paris: 1965. Also in Arabic, Cairo: 1972.
3. A Word Count of Modern Arabic Prose. New York: American Council of Learned Societies, 1959.
4. The Israeli Communist Party and the Elections for the Fifth Knesset, 1961. Stanford, CA: The Hoover Institution, 1956 (=Hoover Institution Studies, 9) (with Professor M.M. Czudnowski).
5. Jews in Nineteenth-Century Egypt. New York: New York University Press, 1969. Also in Hebrew, Jerusalem: 1967.
6. Arabische Literaturgeschichte. Zürich: Artemis Verlag, 1968. Also in Hebrew, Tel Aviv, 1970. Also in Turkish, Ankara: 1994. Second edition, (T.C. Kültür Bakanlığı Yayınları), 2002 (with Professor H.A.R. Gibb).
7. The Arabs in Israel: A Political Study. London: Oxford University Press, under the Auspices of the Royal Institute of International Affairs, 1969, reprinted 1970. Also in Hebrew, Tel Aviv: 1971.
8. The Hejaz Railway and the Muslim Pilgrimage: A Case of Ottoman Political Propaganda. Detroit, MI: Wayne State University Press, 1971.
9. Middle Eastern Themes: Papers in History and Politics. London: Frank Cass, 1973.
10. Radical Politics in Modern Turkey. Leiden: Brill, 1974. Also in Turkish, Ankara: 1978.
11. Politics and Islam: The National Salvation Party in Turkey. Salt Lake City, Utah: The University of Utah, 1976.
12. Abdul-Hamid's Palestine. London: André Deutsch, 1979. Also in Hebrew, Jerusalem: 1979.
13. Pan-Turkism in Turkey: A Study of Irredentism. London: C. Hurst, 1981. Second enlarged edition, 1995. Also in Greek, Athens: 1985. Also in Chinese, Urumchi: 1992. Also in Turkish, Istanbul: 1999. Also in Persian, Tehran: 2024 (fifth edition).
14. Tekinalp, Turkish Patriot 1883–1961. Istanbul and Leiden: Nederlands Historisch-Archaeologisch Instituut, 1984. Also in Turkish, Istanbul: 1996.
15. Ataturk and the Modernization of Turkey, editor. Boulder, Colorado and Leidan: 1984
16. The Politics of Pan-Islam: Ideology and Organization. Oxford: Oxford University Press, 1990. Second edition, 1994. Also in Turkish, Istanbul: 1993.
17. The Arab Minority in Israel, 1967–1991: Political Aspects. Oxford: Oxford University Press, 1993. Also in Hebrew, Tel Aviv: 1993.
18. Arabisches Volkstheater in Kairo im Jahre 1909: Ahmad IlFār und seine Schwaenke. Beirut and Stuttgart: Steiner Verlag, 1993 (=Bibliotheca Islamica, 38) (with Professor M. Woidich).
19. Jews, Arabs, Turks. Jerusalem: Magnes Press, 1993.
20. Hebrew-Arabic Proverbs. Jerusalem and Tel-Aviv: Schocken, 1998 (with Dr. David Sagiv). Second edition, 2002.
21. The Politics of Language in the Ex-Soviet Muslim States (with Professor B. Kellner-Heinkele). Ann Arbor: University of Michigan Press, 2001.
22. Exploring Ottoman and Turkish History. London: Hurst, 2004.
23. Language Politics in Contemporary Central Asia (with Professor B. Kellner-Heinkele). London: I.B. Tauris, 2012. Also in Russian, Moscow: 2015.

== Bibliography ==
Jacob M. Landau, Bibliography of published works. J. M. Landau, Jerusalem: 2015 (690 items).

== Mentioned In ==
- Who's Who in World Jewry, 1965, New York
- Who's Who in Israel, 1966–67, Tel Aviv
- Who's Who in Israel, 2001, Tel-Aviv
- Contemporary Authors 1968, Detroit
- Dictionary of International Biography, 1968, London
- Marquis’ Who's Who in the World, Chicago
- Asia's Who's Who of Men and Women of Achievement, Delhi
- Türk Dili ve Edebiyatı Ansiklopedisi, 1985, Istanbul
- Guide to the Scholars of the History and Culture of Central Asia, 1995, Cambridge, MA
- 2000 Outstanding Scholars of the Twentieth Century, 2000, Cambridge, UK
- The International Directory of Distinguished Leadership, 2000, Raleigh, North Carolina
- The Contemporary Who's Who, 2003, Raleigh, North Carolina
- Encyclopaedia Judaica, Second edition, Volume 12, p. 463

== Obituaries ==
- Levy, Avigdor (Dec 2020). "Jacob M. Landau (1924–2020)". Review of Middle East Studies. 54 (2): 320–325. doi:10.1017/rms.2021.14. ISSN 2151-3481. JSTOR 27034521.
- Leoussi, Athena S (11 March 2021). "Professor Jacob M. Landau (b. Kishinev, 20 March 1924–d. Jerusalem, 12 November 2020)". Nations and Nationalism. 27 (2): 307–308. doi:10.1111/nana.12732. ISSN 1354-5078.
