= David Sagiv =

Israeli linguist and journalist (1928–2019)

- דוד שגיב
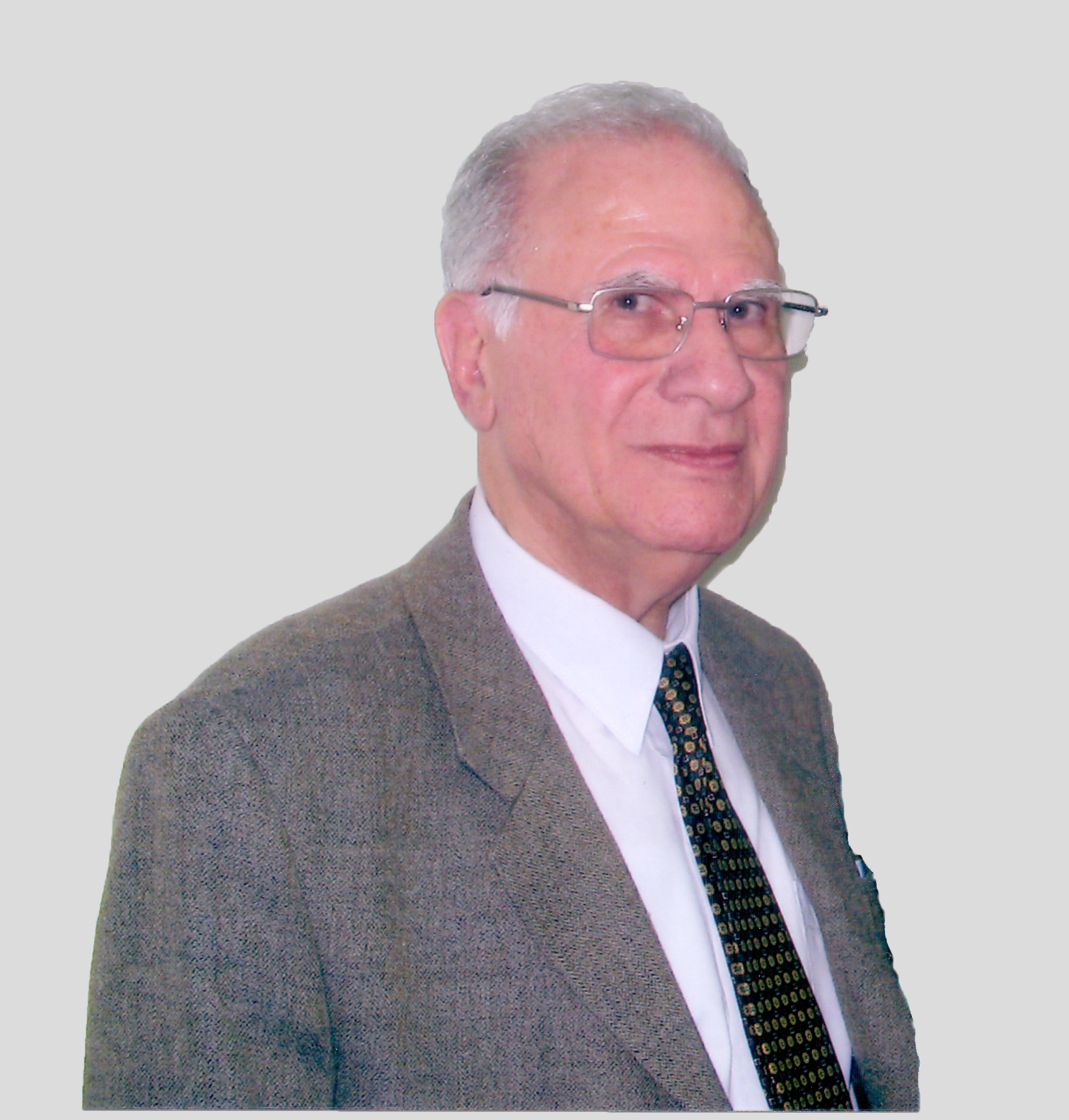
- Born: 1928; Basra, Iraq
- Died: 2019 (aged 90–91); Israel
- Occupations: Linguist, journalist
- Awards: Landau Award (2007)

David Sagiv (Hebrew: דוד שגיב; 1928–2019) was an Israeli linguist and journalist, known as the editor in chief of the Sagiv Dictionary, a bi-directional Hebrew-Arabic and Arabic-Hebrew dictionary.

Sagiv was born in 1928 in Basra, Iraq. In 1951 he immigrated to Israel, soon joined Arabic section of Kol Yisrael radio, and in 1979 was appointed as the director of its Arabic service. After a five-year tenure, he retired and devoted himself to translation, dictionaries and the completion of his academic degrees, including a doctorate at Bar-Ilan University, where he researched fundamentalism in Egypt from 1973 to 1993. He translated a series of literature works from Hebrew into Arabic, including works of Ehud Yaari and Zeev Schiff, and from Arabic into Hebrew, including works of Naguib Mahfouz. From 1988 he served as a research fellow at the Truman Institute.

He became interested in Arabic literature when he was in high school in Iraq, encouraged by his teacher. He started collecting words for the purpose of preparing a Hebrew-Arabic dictionary when he was a news editor for the Kol Yisrael radio, in the late 1950s. When the dictionary was almost ready to print, including about 60,000 entries, he looked for a publisher, but could not find one. He waited several years until a publisher called Zohar approached him, and published the dictionary in four volumes, in 1985. However, several months after the publication of the dictionary, the publisher went bankrupt. Following the bankruptcy of Zohar Publishing, the court returned the rights to the dictionary to Sagiv, who in turn transferred them to Schocken Publishing. After a process of updating and expansion that lasted over two decades, the dictionary was published by Schocken in 1990 in two volumes. An extensive and significantly upgraded version of the Sagiv Dictionary was published by Schocken in 2008.

In 2007, David Sagiv won the Landau Award for his comprehensive work in the field of linguistics.
