= Abdul Fatah Dukhan =

Palestinian politician and militant (1936–2023)

- عبد الفتاح دخان

Member of the Palestinian Legislative Council
- In office 18 February 2006 – 11 October 2023

Personal details
- Born: 1936 Iraq Suwaydan, Palestine
- Died: 11 October 2023 (aged 87) Nuseirat, Gaza Strip, Palestine
- Party: Hamas
- Education: Cairo University
- Occupation: Politician, militant, teacher
- Known for: Co-founder of Hamas

Abdul Fatah Hasan Dukhan (Arabic: عبد الفتاح دخان; 1936 – 11 October 2023), also known as Abu Osama, was a Palestinian politician, militant and a co-founder of Hamas. He was the leading figure in the drafting of the Hamas Charter in 1987.

== Early life ==
Abdul Fatah Hasan Dukhan was born in 1936 and was from Iraq Suwaydan in Mandatory Palestine. In 1948, he was forced to move to Nuseirat Camp in Gaza. He finished his school at an UNRWA school in Gaza and graduated from Cairo University, majoring in geography. He later went back to Gaza and became a teacher at an UNRWA school. Dukhan later became a school principal in the Nuseirat Camp.

== Political career ==
Dukhan participated in the 9 December 1987 meeting of the Palestinian Muslim Brotherhood in Gaza, also attended by Sheikh Yassin, Salah Shehade, Yahya Sinwar and other Hamas co-founders, where Hamas's charter was written, the movement's name was coined, and Hamas was established in Gaza. Dukhan was the lead author of the Hamas Charter, which he described as derived from the thought of Egyptian Muslim Brotherhood theorist Sayyid Qutb. According to Dukhan, the integration of the word "muqawama" (resistance) into Hamas' name was inspired by the Islamic resistance in southern Lebanon.

By 2022, Dukhan was the oldest member of the Palestinian Legislative Council.

== Death ==
Dukkan was reportedly killed in an Israeli airstrike in Nuseirat on 10 October 2023 during the Gaza war. Hamas refuted this claim and stated that he died on 11 October 2023 in Gaza Strip due to the long illness that he endured.

== See also ==
- Casualties of the Gaza war
