= Ze'ev Schiff =

Israeli journalist

- זאב שיף
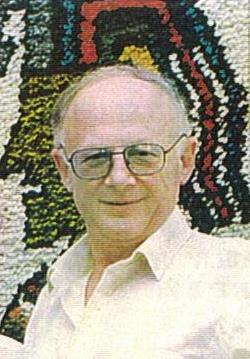
- Ze'ev Schiff in 1980s
- Born: 1 July 1932; Lille, France
- Died: 19 June 2007 (aged 74); Tel Aviv, Israel
- Occupation: Journalist
- Awards: Sokolov Prize (1975)

Ze'ev Schiff (Hebrew: זאב שיף; 1 July 1932 – 19 June 2007) was an Israeli journalist and military correspondent for Haaretz.

Schiff moved to Mandatory Palestine with his family in 1935. He studied Middle Eastern affairs and military history at Tel Aviv University.

Schiff wrote numerous books, including Israel's Lebanon War and Intifada, both with Ehud Ya'ari, and A History of the Israeli Army: 1874 to the Present. He also served as a military correspondent in Vietnam, the Soviet Union, Cyprus and Ethiopia. Schiff won several prizes, including the Sokolov Journalism Prize, the Amos Lev Prize, and the Sarah Reichenstein Prize.

He joined the Haaretz staff in 1955 and became senior associate of the Carnegie Endowment for International Peace in 1984. He was the chairman of the Military Writers Association, a fellow at the Washington Institute for Near East Policy and an Isaac and Mildred Brochstein Fellow in Peace and Security at the James A. Baker III Institute for Public Policy at Rice University.

Schiff died in 2007 in Tel Aviv.

== Published works ==
- Wings over Suez (the Israeli Air Force during the War of Attrition), 1970.
- A History of the Israeli Army: 1870–1974. Simon and Schuster. 1974. ISBN 087932077X.
- War of Deception (1982 Lebanon War), 1984.
- Intifada. Simon And Schuster. 1990. ISBN 978-0671710538. (First Intifada)
- October earthquake: Yom Kippur 1973. Transaction Publishers. 2013. ISBN 978-0878552443.
