= Shaul Mishal =

Israeli academic (1945–2026)

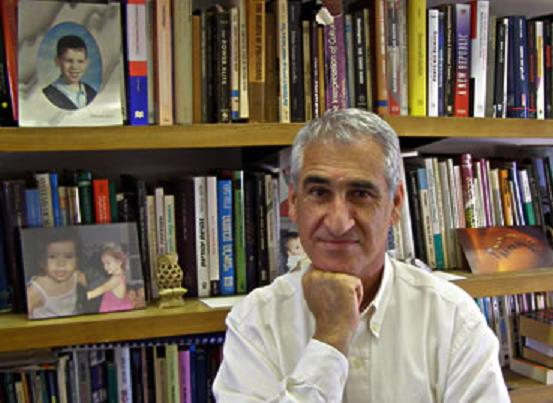

Shaul Mishal (Hebrew: שאול משעל; 1945 – August 18, 2026) was an Israeli academic who was Professor Emeritus of Political Science at Tel Aviv University. Mishal was the Head of the Middle Eastern studies Program at IDC Herzliya, researcher of Arab and Palestinian politics who founded and directed the Center for the Study of Arab Society in Israel. Mishal authored and co-authored several books and numerous articles in subjects related to Arab and Islamic political cultures and Palestinian politics.

== Background ==
Shaul Mishal was born in Baghdad, Iraq in 1945, and made aliyah with his family in 1951 and for next 8 years they lived in ma'abara Talpiot.

He studied political science, philosophy and sociology, received his Ph.D. in Political Science from the Hebrew University of Jerusalem and completed his postdoctoral research at Yale University. Mishal was a visiting professor at Yale University, visiting scholar at the Center for International Affairs at Harvard and Senior Fellow at the Harvard School of Public Health.

Mishal died on August 18, 2026, at the age of 81.

== Hamas: goals ==
Mishal's main thesis deals with Palestinian Hamas. It is often described solely as a movement identified with Islamic fundamentalism and suicide bombings. The objectives at the top of its agenda are the liberation of Palestine through a holy war (Jihad) against Israel, establishing an Islamic state on its soil, and reforming society in the spirit of true Islam. It is this Islamic vision, combined with its nationalist claims and militancy toward Israel, that accounts for the prevailing image of Hamas as a rigid movement, ready to pursue its goals at any cost, with no limits or constraints. Yet, Mishal claims that a close scrutiny of Hamas’s roots and its record since its establishment at the outbreak of the first Palestinian uprising (Intifada)Against the Israeli occupation in December 1987 reveals that, although Hamas has been reluctant to publicly compromise its ultimate objectives, it does not subordinate its activities and decisions to the officially held religious doctrine. Rather, it operates in a context of opportunities and constraints, conflicting interests, and cost-benefit considerations, and is attentive to the fluctuating needs and desires of the Palestinian population and cognizant of power relations and political feasibility. Moreover, despite the horrifying toll claimed by Hamas’s violence, it is essentially a social and political movement, providing extensive community services and responding constantly to political reality through bargaining and power brokering. Along this line, it has been reluctant to adhere to its religious dogma at any price and so has tended to adopt political strategies that minimize the danger of rigidly adhering to principle, doctrine, or ideology, ready to respond or adjust to fluid conditions. Thus, Mishal concludes that a political understanding between Hamas and Israel, through a third party, is a viable option. Such a course would minimize the intensity of the shock to its supporters if it entered a public dialogue with Israel.

== Hamas: victory and regime change ==
In 2006, Hamas won 74 out of the legislative council's 132 seats, capturing a majority and becoming the dominant force in the new Palestinian government. Mishal asserts that Hamas's electoral victory over the Fatah-led nationalist camp is not merely an act of transfer of power but a mandate for regime change. Regime change, unlike transfer of power, entails a revision of the fundamental principles of government and the overall goals of the Palestinian Authority − a redefinition of the PA's regional and international policies, as well as its basic parameters and red lines concerning its approach to Israel. Given Hamas's Islamic doctrine, regime change harbors religious significance for the Palestinian national agenda.

The Islam-driven worldview spawns several principles, first of all, a commitment to territorial maximalism with an eye towards the establishment of an Islamic state throughout all of Mandatory Palestine. This vision replaces the political realism that accepts the framework of a two-state solution, Israel alongside a Palestinian state. A second principle is Islamic social activism, instead of a civil-minded, statewide program; and a third principle is the perception of the Palestinian-Israeli conflict as a predetermined clash of destinies, instead of a conflict over boundaries.

== Hamas: dissenting views ==
The notion that Hamas could somehow be lured away from its agenda seems to be gaining wider currency. In an address to a group of European MPs, The Hamas leader in Gaza, Ismail Haniyeh, said his government was willing to accept a Palestinian state within the 1967 borders. Yet, there are others who suggest that hamas's acceptance of a cease fire is only a ploy. Efraim Karsh claims in this regard that "Above all, not only is the destruction of Israel not a bargaining chip, it is the heart of the matter. Hamas, which is the Palestinian branch of the Muslim Brotherhood, sees the struggle for Palestine as neither an ordinary political dispute between two contending nations (Israelis and Palestinians), nor even as a struggle for national self-determination by an indigenous population against a foreign occupier. Rather, it sees Palestine as but one battle in a worldwide holy war to prevent the fall of a part of the House of Islam to infidels".

== The Palestinians: a network approach ==
Palestinians did not, and still do not fully have, a state that can try to penetrate society and create a hierarchical system in which external links flow through it. While communal affiliations play a role in dividing Palestinian society along regional and extended family lines, it too has not played a definitive role in shaping Palestinian identity and claims to self-determination vis à vis Israel.

Having no state and formal political institutions, and being divided among themselves by the ideological currents gripping the Arab world, Palestinian society emerged as a networked society par excellence. Palestinians lacked any kind of hierarchical or networked state, instead being divided among other states none of which, with the partial exception of Jordan, attempted in any way to assimilate them into their societies. Palestinians were divided by ideologies between various streams of pan-Arabism.

Since the Palestinians continued to lack a state, they were unable to build a centralized institutions and a hierarchical political order. The decentralized nature of Palestinian society has become all the more evident in the wake of the Oslo Accords - despite the fact that the Palestinians had been given an opportunity to begin constructing a hierarchical state to penetrate and centralize Palestinian society via the PA. They have in fact made the PA into a reflection of their society - an amalgamation of decentralized and perpetually quarreling factions. Hence, in the Palestinian case, the society is penetrating the state rather than vice versa.

The 1993 Declaration of Principles (the first, in a series of agreements that came to be known as the Oslo Accords) signed between Israel and the PLO was followed by the establishment of the PA in May 1994. Despite the creation of a quasi-official Palestinian government, the pattern of relations between Israel and the Palestinians did not change significantly, despite the existence of a supposedly all-Palestinian PA, and was still based on relations between Israel and the PLO (especially Fatah). Yasser Arafat’s hesitation to transfer real authority from Fatah to the organs of the PA, thus ensured that real understandings reached between him and Israel will tend to be based on informal channels of communication rather than via official links. Hence, as in the case of Jordan (but all the more so since the Palestinian state is still in its fetal stage), ties tend, to a large extent, to be based on informal relations and a large measure of trust - since formal agreements worked out with the PA will be largely meaningless if not backed by Fatah.

This network analysis has major implications for the future of Israeli-Palestinian relations. It suggests that codified agreements between Israel and the PA provide only a part of the overall relationship between the parties. Trust is essential since most of the relationships exist outside the documents and the formalized relationships provide insufficient certainty since they are not binding on the parties with respect to the final settlement of the conflict.

== Shiite leadership ==
Shiites, says conventional wisdom, seek to convert the Sunni world, take over the Middle East or simply bomb Israel into the Stone Age. In any case, their plan is clear-cut, drastic and single-minded. All means necessary are appropriate for its realization. yet Mishal claims that Close scrutiny reveals, however, that Shiite leadership lives and acts in a more complex world. Shiite leadership is new at the helm of government, yet acts with the prudence of long experience. It is spoken of as mystical or otherworldly in essence, yet its behavior is often realistically sober. While the far-reaching vision of the new Shiite leadership appears utopian, its demeanor frequently seems skeptical and wary. The worldview of Shiite leadership is one which contracts and expands continuously. Shiite leaders are nationalists, but see themselves as a regional, even global power. They are propelled by a keen awareness of their population's needs, while being motivated by an inextricable link to eternal truths.

Life in a state of discrepancy encourages Shiite leaders to reject the notion that reality begins with abstract ideas. They feel uncomfortable with ascetic mysticism, which calls for the abandonment of the self and a union with the divine. Conversely, Shiite leaders refuse to see actions and interests as the basis of reality. They cannot accept the Marxist understanding of history as determined by struggles over power. At the same time, they disown Capitalism, the notion that a free market regulates itself both morally and financially.

== Principal publications ==
=== Books ===
- The Palestinian Hamas: Vision, Violence and Coexistence (with A. Sela) Columbia University Press, First Edition 2000, Second Edition 2006. Also published as: The Hamas Wind - Violence and Coexistence Yediot Ahronot Books, First Edition 1999, Second Edition 2006 (Hebrew).
- Investment in Peace: The Politics of Economic Cooperation Between Israel, Jordan, and the Palestinians (with R. Kuperman, D. Boas) Sussex Academic Press, 2001.
- Speaking Stones: Communiques from the Intifada Underground (with R. Aharoni) Syracuse University Press, 1994. Also published as Speaking Stones: The Words Behind the Palestinian Intifada, Hakibbutz Hameuhad, 1989 (Hebrew).
- The PLO Under Arafat: Between Gun and Olive Branch, Yale University Press, 1986.
- West Bank/East Bank: The Palestinians in Jordan, 1949–1967, Yale University Press, 1978.

=== Selected articles ===
- Place as a Source of Identity in Colonizing Societies: Israeli Settlements in Gaza Geographical Review, Vol.98, No.2, pp., 242-259, 2008. (With I. Schnell)
- "Al Qaeda as Dune Organization toward a Typology of Islamic Terrorism Organization" (with M. Rosenthal). Studies in Conflict and Terrorism, Vol.28, No.4, 2005, pp. 275–293.
- "What Happened to Suicide Bombing in Israel: Insight from a Terror Stock Model" (with E. Kaplan, A. Mintz, C. Samban). Studies in Conflict and Terrorism, Vol.28, No.3, 2005, pp. 225–235.
- "The Pragmatic Dimension of the Palestinian Hamas: A Network Perspective", Armed Forces and Society, Vol.29, No.4, 2003, pp. 569–589.
- "Political Expectations and Cultural Perceptions in the Arab-Israeli Peace Negotiations" (with N. Morag). Political Psychology, Vol.23, No.2, 2002, pp. 325–353.
- "Participation Without Presence: Hamas, the PA and the Politics of Negotiated Coexistence" (with A. Sela). Middle Eastern Studies, Vol.38, 2002, pp. 1–26.
- "The Network State: Triangular Relations in Middle Eastern Politics" (with I. Talmud). International Journal of Contemporary Sociology, Vol.37, No.2, 2000, pp. 175–197.
- "Trust or Contract? Negotiating Formal and Informal Agreements in the Arab-Israeli Peace Process" (with N. Morag). International Negotiation, No.5, 2000, pp. 523–542.
- "Intifada Discourse: The Hamas and UNL Leaflets", The PLO and Israel, Avraham Sela and Moshe Ma'oz (eds.), St. Martin's Press, 1997.
- "Israel and the PLO: A Game with Different Information" (with D. Schmiedler, I. Sened). Game Theory and Applications, T. Ichiishi, A. Neyman, Y. Touman (eds.), Academic Press, 1990.
- "The Unfolding of the Intifada" Survey of Jewish Affairs 1990, William Frankel (ed.), Basil Blackwell, 1990, pp. 3–23.
- "Paper War - Words Behind Stones: The Intifada Leaflets" The Jerusalem Quarterly, No.51, 1989, pp. 71–94.
- "Coalition Formation in the Arab World: An Analytical Perspective" (with A. Diskin). International Interactions, Vol.11, 1984, pp. 43–59.
- "Palestinian Voting in the West Bank: Electoral Behavior in a Traditional Community Without Sovereignty" (with A. Diskin). The Journal of Politics, Vo.44, 1982, pp. 538–58.
- "Nationalism through Localism: Some Observations on the West Bank Political Elite", The Middle Eastern Studies, Vol.17, 1981, pp. 478–91.
