= Yossi Kuperwasser =

Israeli intelligence and security expert

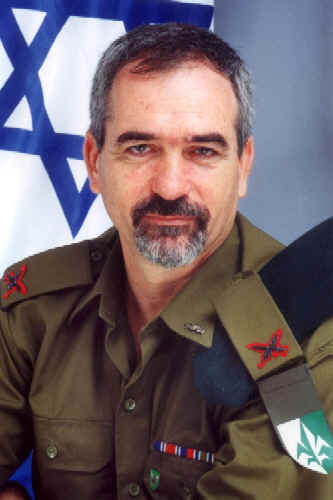
Kuperwasser as head of the research division at the Military Intelligence Service

Yossi Kuperwasser (Hebrew: יוסי קופרווסר) is an Israeli intelligence and security expert. Formerly, Kuperwasser served as the head of the research division in the Israel Defence Force (IDF) Military Intelligence division and Director General of the Israel Ministry of Strategic Affairs.

At the moment, Kuperwasser is the director and head of the Jerusalem Institute for Strategy and Security (JISS).

== Career ==
After completing his conscription (compulsory military service) as a Rifleman in a Light Infantry Regiment, Kuperwasser was commissioned as an Officer in the Artillery Corps in 1976, in a position in which he was a Forward Observer embedded with frontline Infantry, Special Forces and Armoured Corps teams during the 1978 South Lebanon conflict and the 1982 Lebanon War. During his stint as a young officer in the Artillery, he also completed a licensed course on flying observer Helicopters and was for a time an "Air Observer" i.e a helicopter pilot spotting targets for the Artillery. In 1985 he became a Battery Commander of a Self-Propelled Artillery unit. In 1987 he was seconded to the Military Intelligence Directorate, in which he served in many different capacities. For two-years, beginning in 1992, he was the Assistant Defense Attache for Intelligence at the Israeli Embassy in Washington, D.C.. Four years later, Kuperwasser became an intelligence officer at the IDF's Central Command for three years. Following this position, Kuperwasser immediately assumed the role as Head of the Analysis and Production Division of the IDF Directorate of Military Intelligence. According to his profile IDC Herzliya's International Institute for Counter-Terrorism, during his time in this role "He has a significant role in determining Israel's coping methods with terror as well as regional developments, and sharing such analysis with the US and other foreign entities."

In response to an interview The Atlantic's Jeffrey Goldberg did with former President Barack Obama in 2015, Goldberg republished Kupperwasser's critique in its entirety. "I received any number of interesting responses, but few were as comprehensive as that of Yossi Kupperwasser," Goldberg stated. Kuperwasser concluded by asserting:

In short, even though Israel, under Prime Minister Netanyahu, remains committed to the formula of “two states for two peoples, with mutual recognition,” the implementation of this idea at this point is irrelevant. The PA’s poor governance and the general turmoil in the Middle East render any establishment of a Palestinian state right now unviable. President Obama admitted as much, reluctantly, but continued to criticize Netanyahu instead of betraying his optimist paradigm. Netanyahu’s realism would stray too far from the path Obama, and other Western leaders, have set in front of them. But while Obama and the optimists offer their critiques, Netanyahu and the realists will be on the ground, living with the consequences the optimists have wrought.

Beyond his military experience, Kuperwasser has dedicated much of his time in recent years to academic and journalistic endeavours. His writings have appeared in Haaretz, the Begin-Sadat Center for Strategic Studies, and the Jerusalem Center for Public Affairs (the latter two being Israeli think-tanks).
