= Ehud Yaari =

Israeli journalist

Ehud Yaari אהוד יערי
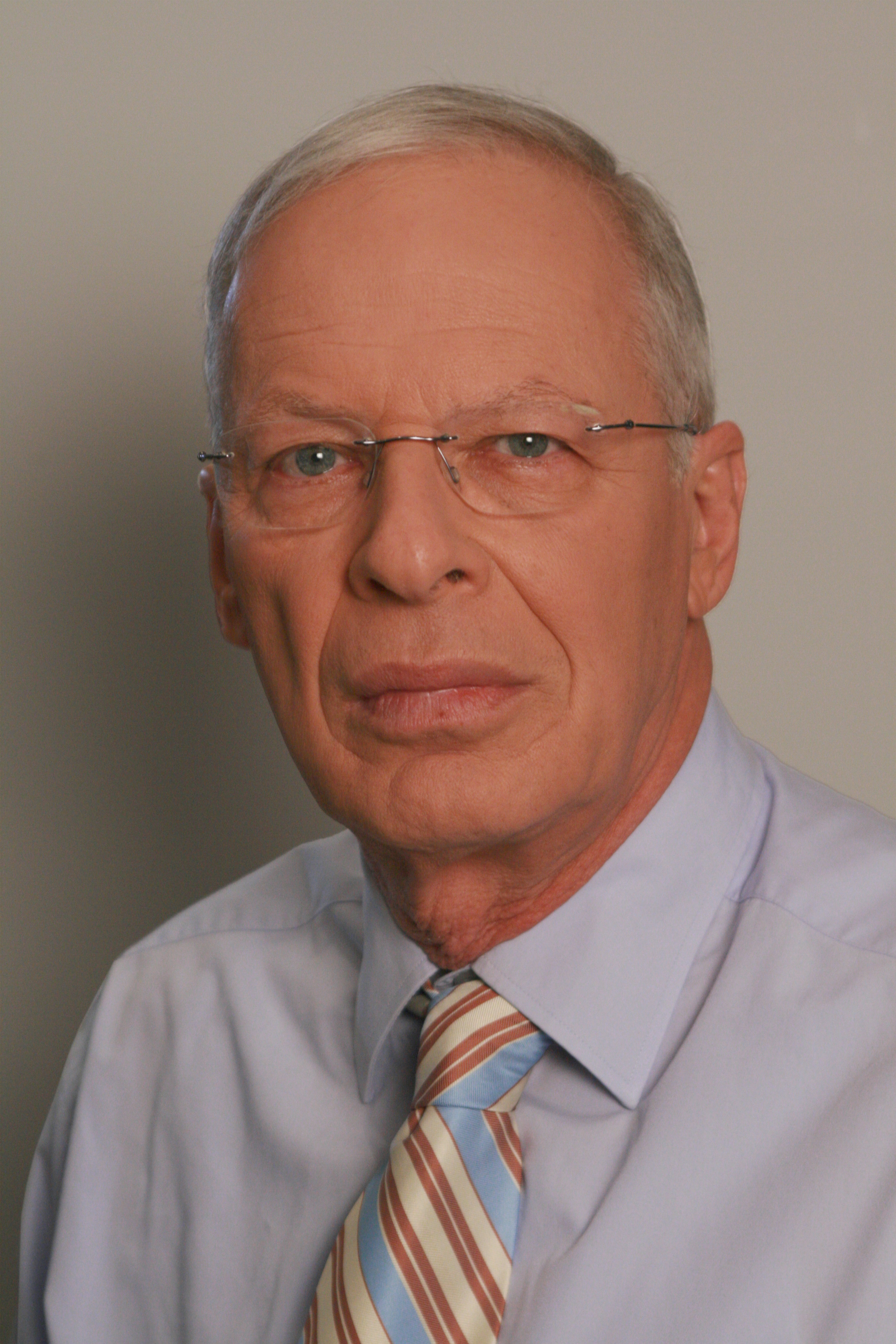
- Ehud Yaari in 2008
- Born: 1 March 1945 (age 81); Metula, Mandatory Palestine
- Education: Hebrew University of Jerusalem
- Occupation: Journalism
- Children: 2

Ehud Yaari (Hebrew: אֵהוּד יָעָרִי; born 1 March 1945) is an Israeli journalist, author, television personality and political commentator.

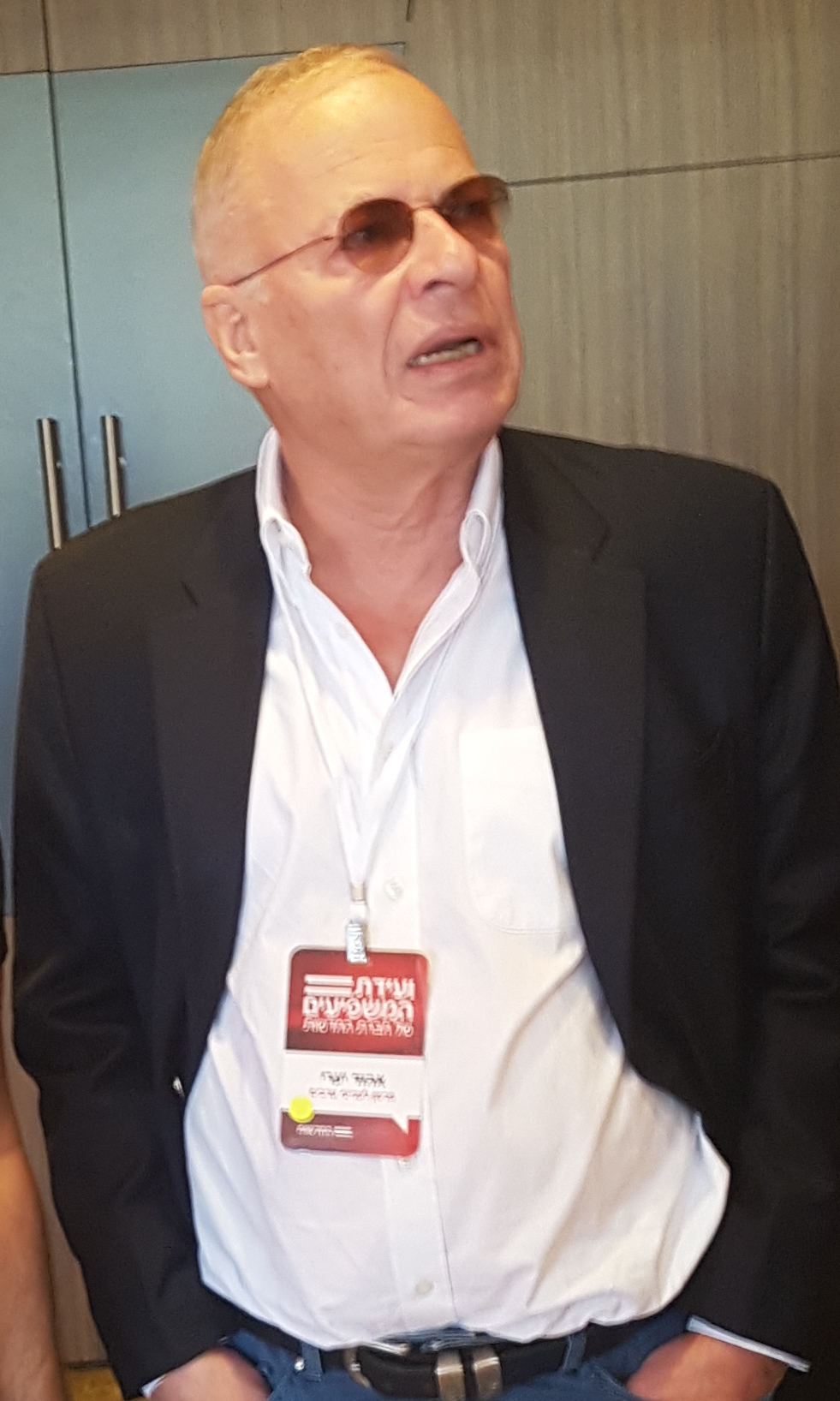
Ehud Yaari in 2018

== Biography ==
Ehud Ya'ari was born in 1945 in Metula, Mandatory Palestine. He attended Tichon Hadash high school in Tel Aviv. He holds a BA in Middle Eastern Studies from the Hebrew University of Jerusalem, and an MA in Middle Eastern Studies from Tel Aviv University.

In 1968, he was an assistant to Shlomo Gazit, the Coordinator of Government Activities in the Territories. From 1969 to 1975, he was the Arab affairs correspondent for the newspaper Davar and Israel Army Radio. From 1975 to 2000, he was a commentator on Middle Eastern affairs on Channel 1. In 1987, he became a fellow at the Washington Institute for Near East Policy, and in 1990, he became a columnist for The Jerusalem Report. He became a commentator on Arab affairs on Channel 2 in 2000. In 2008, he joined the Adelson Institute for Strategic Studies of the Shalem Center.

Yaari has reported from Egypt and Lebanon, and in 1997, reported from Washington. He interviewed many Arab statesmen and leaders, and also conducted an interview with US President Bill Clinton.

== Media career ==
Ehud Yaari is an expert on Middle Eastern affairs. He is the author of eight books on the Arab-Israeli conflict, some in collaboration with Ze'ev Schiff. He has interviewed Yasser Arafat, King Hussein of Jordan and his son Abdullah, President Husni Mubarak of Egypt, almost all Israeli prime ministers since Menachem Begin (including Yitzhak Rabin), Bashar al-Assad, Bachir Gemayel, Muammar al-Gaddafi and others. Today, Ya'ari is a political commentator for Israel's Channel 2 news. Yaari is an associate editor of The Jerusalem Report and the Washington Institute for Near East Policy. He is also Senior Fellow at the Adelson Institute for Strategic Studies. Ya'ari has published articles in The New York Times, The Wall Street Journal, The Washington Post, and Atlantic Monthly.

== Personal life ==
He was married to Hava Yaari, who worked as a foreign securities adviser at a bank, and they had a son, Tzahi, and a daughter, Ephrat. In 1987 he divorced Hava after she was convicted along with a friend of hers of murdering and embezzled funds from Mala Malavsky, a Jewish-American tourist and Holocaust survivor. At the time, Hava Yaari's trial was considered to be the most highly sensational murder case in Israel's history. Yaari later married Dagmar Strauss.

His brother, Yehuda Yaari, is also a journalist and lecturer at Ariel University. Ehud's son, Tzahi, gained attention in the Israeli media for his conversion to Christianity and later for allegations of harassing Israeli news anchor Miki Haimovich. The harassment case against Tzahi was dropped after he was deemed unfit to stand trial.

== Awards ==
- Israeli Press Editors-in-Chief prize for coverage of the peace process with Egypt
- Sokolov Prize for coverage of the Lebanon War
- Israel Broadcasting Award for coverage of the Gulf War

== Published works ==
- "Fatah" (Sabra Books, 1971)
- "Egypt's Policy Towards Israel in the Fifties" (1974)
- "A Guide to Egypt" (1982)
- "The Year of the Dove", co-authored with Ze'ev Schiff (Bantam, 1979)
- "Israel's Lebanon War" (Simon and Schuster, 1984)
- "Intifada", co-authored with Ze'ev Schiff (Simon and Schuster, 1990)
- "Toward Israeli-Palestinian Disengagement" and “Peace by Piece: A Decade of Egyptian Policy”.

== See also ==
- Television in Israel
