= Mujama al-Islamiya =

Islamic charity established in 1973

Islamic Centre
- Arabic: المجمع الإسلامي
- Founded: 1973
- Type: NGO
- Location: Gaza, Palestine
- Region served: Palestine
- Key people: Ahmed Yassin

The Mujama' al-Islami (Arabic: المجمع الإسلامي, lit. 'Islamic Centre') is an Islamic charity founded in 1973 in Gaza by Sheikh Ahmed Yassin, who had been involved with the Egyptian Muslim Brotherhood's Palestinian branch. Mujama established clinics, blood banks, day cares, medical treatments, soup kitchens and youth clubs, and extended financial aid and scholarships to young people seeking to study in Saudi Arabia and the West. In 1979, Israel recognized Al-Mujama' al-Islam as a charity, allowing the organization to set up the Islamic University in Gaza (IUG) and build mosques, clubs, schools, and a library in Gaza.

== History ==
Mujama al-Islamiya was formed in 1973 by Sheikh Yassin, and offered services and programs located in mosques in Gaza. During the late 1970s and 1980s, the organization coerced urban educated women in Gaza to wear hijab, head coverings in Islam.

In January 1980, the movement initiated a riot against offices of the Palestine Red Crescent Society, leftists in Gaza, and Gazan shops that were deemed "immoral".

In 1984, the Israeli military infiltrated a suspected mosque and found a cache of weapons. Sheikh Yassin and others were jailed for secretly stockpiling weapons, but he was released in 1985 as part of the Jibril Agreement. He continued to expand Mujama's reach across Gaza.

=== Formation of Hamas ===
In 1987, during the First Intifada, Yassin and six other Mujama Islamist members launched Hamas, originally calling it the "paramilitary wing" of the Palestinian Muslim Brotherhood, and Yassin became its spiritual leader. He also claimed responsibility for a number of suicide attacks targeting Israeli civilians, and Hamas was designated a terrorist organization. By that time, Mujama controlled an estimated 40% of mosques in Gaza. Mujama's institutions would become crucial to Hamas's terrorist activities. They were and continue to provide cover for raising, laundering and transferring funds, facilitate the group's propaganda and recruitment efforts, provide employment for its operatives, and serve as a logistical support network.

In February 2007, Fatah militia stormed the Islamic University in Gaza and confiscated weapons and ammunition that were stored there. Palestinian television aired footage showing dozens of rocket-propelled grenade launchers, rockets, and assault rifles, as well as thousands of bullets which had been found inside the university.

In December 2008, the university was bombed in six air strikes by the Israeli Air Force during the 2008 Gaza War, claiming that university facilities were being used by Hamas to develop and store weapons including Qassam rockets used to target Israeli civilians. Hamas denied the Israeli allegation. The university was again targeted by air strikes during the 2014 Israel–Gaza conflict. The Israeli army said it targeted a "weapon development" centre in the university.

== Related entities ==
The Islamic Charitable Society is a non-profit charitable organisation located in Hebron in the West Bank. The charity was founded in 1962 to take care of orphans and expanded through years. It is now responsible for two orphanages, three schools for boys and girls, dairy, sewing workshop, two bakeries, a large mall and a 30-apartment building.

According to a 2006 episode of the BBC's series Panorama:

the Islamic Charitable Society has received funding from Interpal and is associated with Hamas. Citing the Charity Commission for England and Wales and a draft report from the U.S. Treasury's Asset Freezing Working Group, it was alleged on that the Islamic Charitable Society has "a well-documented supporting role within the Hamas infrastructure" and that it had "funded and administered educational programmes that appear tantamount to incitement and indoctrination in support of violent Hamas activity.

== See also ==
- Holy Land Foundation for Relief and Development
- Islamic Association of Palestine
- InfoCom Corporation
- Interpal
- Israeli support for Hamas
- Union of Good
