= January 1980 Mujama al-Islamiya riot =

1980 Islamist riot in the Gaza Strip

On 7 January 1980, members of the conservative Islamist Mujama al-Islamiya movement rioted in the Gaza Strip, targeting the offices of the Palestine Red Crescent Society, leftist Gazans, and shopkeepers who they deemed immoral.

== Background ==
The Palestinian Gaza Strip had been occupied by Israel since the Six-Day War in 1967. By the late 1970s, the Gaza Strip was experiencing significant internal tensions, including widespread poverty in the refugee camps, growing Islamist fundamentalism (represented especially by the recently-founded Mujama al-Islamiya movement), a lack of elections (with local government figures being appointed by the Israeli Military Governorate), as well as conflict between leftist, Islamist, pro-Egyptian, and pro-Jordanian political factions. Israeli general and military governor of the Gaza Strip Yitzhak Segev told The New York Times in March 1981 that "the people are afraid of each other like animals," adding that the Israeli military used drug dealing networks as intelligence sources and that the military was funding Islamist fundamentalists in Gaza to combat the influence of the PLO.

== Events ==
In December 1979, the Palestine Red Crescent Society held its internal elections to select its president and its executive committee. In the elections, Mujama al-Islamiya supported Fatah-linked candidate Assad Saftawi, who ran on a platform with Mujama member Ibrahim Al-Yazouri as his vice-president. The campaign marked the first time since 1972 that the Red Crescent's incumbent director, PFLP-linked Haidar Abdel-Shafi, did not run unopposed. Abdel-Shafi was re-elected as director, with members of his platform winning seventeen of twenty-one seats on the Red Crescent's executive committee. In the aftermath of the election, Saftawi claimed that the voting had been fraudulent and resigned his Red Crescent membership.

On 7 January 1980, several hundred Mujama al-Islamiya members gathered at a mosque in Gaza City with the goal of marching on the offices of the Red Crescent in the city. Palestinian psychiatrist Eyad al-Sarraj described the march on the Red Crescent offices as "a big Islamist demonstration, people with beards shouting their slogans. At the end of the demonstration was an Israeli military jeep which did not interfere," saying that one the demonstrators told him when he confronted them that "our problem is with the infidels - people who don't believe in God. These are the real enemy." When they reached the Red Crescent's office, the rioters ransacked and burned the office. Also burned down was the Red Crescent's library.

Following the attack on the Red Crescent's office, the Mujama al-Islamiya rioters dispersed throughout the city, attacking shopkeepers, restaurants, and cafés that sold alcoholic drinks. Some of the rioters attempted to march on the Abdel-Shafi's personal home. The Israeli military intervened then to prevent the rioters from reaching Abdel-Shafi's house. The Israeli military made no attempts to disperse the riots in other parts of the city.

Tensions in Gaza raised by the riot would remain high over the following days, with Mujama al-Islamiya members attempting to burn down the local branch of Jerusalem-based nationalist Palestinian newspaper Al-Quds and a cinema.

== Reactions ==
The Palestine Red Crescent Society accused the Israeli military of "complicity" in the riot. Palestinian psychiatrist Eyad al-Sarraj claimed to have confronted Israeli military governor of the Gaza Strip Yitzhak Segev after the riot, accusing the Israeli military of "playing with fire," and being told by Segev in response that "Don't worry, we know how to handle things. Our enemy today is the PLO."

== Analysis ==
In his 2020 book The Palestinian Left and Its Decline, Francesco Saverio Leopardi of Ca' Foscari University of Venice wrote that the attack on the Red Crescent was "still vivid in the memory of leftist militants from the whole OPT as they demonstrated the Islamists' will to take over control of the nationalist movement by any means, without being concerned about using violence against fellow Palestinians."
