= Ahmed Yassin =

Palestinian political and religious leader (1936–2004)

Sheikh Ahmed Yassin
- أحمد ياسين
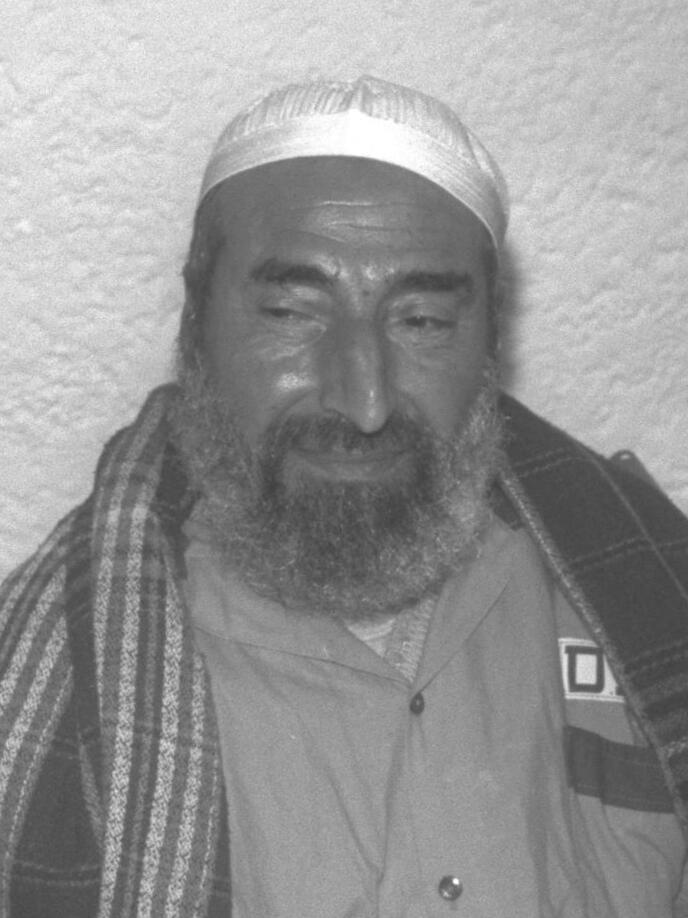
- Yassin in 1990

Chairman of the Hamas Shura Council
- In office 10 December 1987 – 22 March 2004
- Deputy: Abdel Aziz al-Rantisi
- Preceded by: Position established
- Succeeded by: Abdel Aziz al-Rantisi

1st Chairman of the Hamas Political Bureau in the Gaza Strip
- In office October 1997 – 22 March 2004
- Preceded by: Position established
- Succeeded by: Abdel Aziz al-Rantisi

Personal details
- Born: Ahmed Ismail Hassan Yassin; June 1936 Al-Jura, Mandatory Palestine (near Al-Majdal, now known as Ashkelon, Israel)
- Died: March 22, 2004 (aged either 67, 68, or 75) Gaza City, Gaza Strip
- Cause of death: Assassination
- Party: Hamas
- Education: Ain Shams University, Cairo
- Occupation: Politician; Imam

Sheikh Ahmed Ismail Hassan Yassin (Arabic: الشيخ أحمد إسماعيل حسن ياسين; June 1936/37 – 22 March 2004) was a Palestinian politician and imam who founded Hamas, an Islamist political and military organization. He also served as the first chairman of the Hamas Shura Council and de facto leader of Hamas since its inception from December 1987 until his assassination in March 2004.

He was born in Ashkelon, in Mandatory Palestine in 1929 or 1936/1937. His family fled or were expelled during the 1948 Palestine War to Gaza City. Yassin, a quadriplegic who was nearly blind, had been reliant on a wheelchair due to a sporting accident at the age of 16.

He served as the spiritual leader of Hamas after its founding in 1987. The Israeli government held him responsible for the killing of several Israeli civilians. He was killed during an Israeli airstrike in 2004 in Gaza City, which was internationally condemned.

== Early life and education ==
Ahmed Yassin was born in al-Jura, a small village near the city of Ashkelon, in the Mandatory Palestine. His date of birth is not known for certain: according to his Palestinian passport, he was born on 1 January 1929, but he claimed to have actually been born in the summer of 1936. His father, Abdullah Yassin, died when he was three years old. Afterward, he became known in his neighborhood as Ahmad Sa'ada after his mother Sa'ada al-Habeel. This was to differentiate him from the children of his father's other three wives. Together, Yassin had four brothers and two sisters. He and his entire family fled to Gaza, settling in al-Shati Camp after his village was ethnically cleansed by the Israel Defense Forces during the 1948 Arab–Israeli War.

Yassin came to Gaza as a refugee. He sustained a severe spinal injury when he was 16, while wrestling his friend Abdullah al-Khatib. His neck was kept in plaster for 45 days. The damage to his spinal cord rendered him a quadriplegic for the rest of his life. Fearing a rift between his family and al-Khatib's, Yassin initially told his family that he sustained his injuries while playing leapfrog during a sports lesson with his school friends on the beach.

Although Yassin applied to and attended Ain Shams University in Cairo, he was unable to pursue his studies there due to his deteriorating health and economic problems. He was forced to be educated at home where he read widely, particularly on philosophy and on religion, politics, sociology, and economics. His followers believe that his worldly knowledge made him "one of the best speakers in the Gaza Strip". During this time, he began delivering weekly sermons after Friday prayers, drawing large crowds of people.

After years of unemployment, he got a post as an Arabic language teacher at an elementary school in Rimal, Gaza. Headmaster Mohammad al-Shawa initially had reservations about Yassin, concerning the reception he would receive from the pupils due to his disability. However, according to al-Shawa, Yassin handled them well and his popularity grew, especially among the more scholarly children. His teaching methods reportedly provoked mixed reactions among parents because he encouraged his students to attend the mosque an additional two times a week. Having a regular job gave Yassin financial stability, and he married one of his relatives Halima Yassin in 1960 at the age of 22. The couple had eleven children.

== Involvement in the Israeli–Palestinian conflict ==
Yassin at Israeli military court in 1990

Yassin was actively involved in setting up a Palestinian branch of the Muslim Brotherhood. In 1973, the Islamic charity Mujama al-Islamiya was established in Gaza by Sheikh Ahmed Yassin and the organization was recognized by Israel in 1979. In 1984 he and others were jailed for secretly stockpiling weapons, but in 1985 he was released as part of the Jibril Agreement. In 1987, during the First Intifada, Yassin co-founded Hamas with Abdel Aziz al-Rantisi, originally calling it the "paramilitary wing" of the Palestinian Muslim Brotherhood, and becoming its spiritual leader.

In 1989, Yassin was arrested by Israel and sentenced to life imprisonment for ordering killings of alleged Palestinian collaborators. In 1997, Yassin was released from Israeli prison as part of an arrangement with Jordan following a failed assassination attempt of Hamas leader Khaled Mashal by the Israeli Mossad in Jordan. Yassin was released in exchange for two Mossad agents who had been arrested by Jordanian authorities, on the condition that he refrained from continuing to call for suicide bombings against Israel. The New York Times reported about his poor health at the time: "Sheik Ahmad Yassin, spiritual leader of Hamas, back home in Gaza after his release by Israel, is so frail he drinks only with help."

Following his release, Yassin resumed his leadership of Hamas. He immediately repeated his calls for attacks on Israel, using tactics including suicide bombings, thus violating the condition of his release. He also sought to maintain relations with the Palestinian Authority, believing that a clash between the two groups would be harmful to the interests of the Palestinian people. Yassin was intermittently placed under house arrest by the Authority. Each time he was eventually released, often after extended demonstrations by his supporters. Yassin criticized the outcome of the 2003 Aqaba summit. His group initially declared a temporary truce with Israel. However, in July 2003, the truce unravelled after a Hamas suicide bombing of a Jerusalem bus killed 21 people the previous month. Israeli forces killed two Hamas members in retaliation.

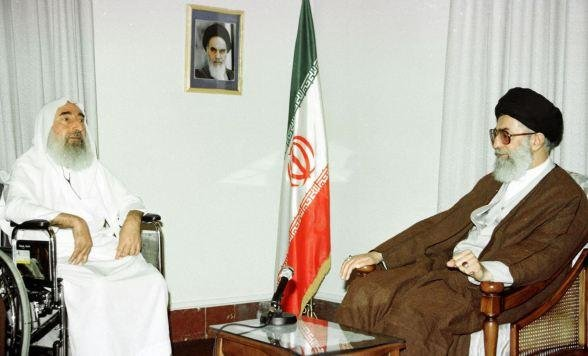
Yassin meeting with Iranian Supreme Leader Ali Khamenei in Tehran (1998)

On 6 September 2003, an Israeli Air Force (IAF) F-16 fired several missiles on a building in Gaza City in the Gaza Strip. Yassin was in the building at the time but survived. Israeli officials later confirmed that Yassin was the target of the attack. His injuries were treated at Shifa Hospital in Gaza City. Yassin responded to the media that "Days will prove that the assassination policy will not finish the Hamas. Hamas leaders wish to be martyrs and are not scared of death. Jihad will continue and the resistance will continue until we have victory, or we will be martyrs."

Yassin further promised that Hamas would teach Israel an "unforgettable lesson" as a result of the assassination attempt. Yassin made no attempt to guard himself from further attempts on his life or hide his location. Journalists sometimes visited his Gaza address and Yassin maintained a routine daily pattern of activity, including being wheeled every morning to a nearby mosque.

Reem Riyashi's suicide bombing at the Erez crossing on 14 January 2004, which killed three soldiers and one civilian, was believed by the Israeli military to have been directly ordered by Yassin. Yassin suggested that the suicide bomber was fulfilling her "obligation" to make jihad, and Israel's Deputy Defence Minister responded by publicly declaring that Yassin was "marked for death". Yassin denied any involvement in the attack.

== Views ==
=== Involvement in attacks on Israel ===
Yassin was a founder and leader of Hamas, which is regarded as a terrorist organization by Australia, Canada, Israel, Japan, Paraguay, New Zealand, the United Kingdom, the United States and the European Union. Israeli Prime Minister Ariel Sharon characterized Yassin as the "mastermind of Palestinian terror" and a "mass murderer". The Israeli government repeatedly asserted that Yassin was responsible for a number of terrorist attacks, which targeted and killed civilians.

He proposed a halt of attacks on Israel in 1997, if Israel withdrew from the West Bank and Gaza. He declared in his statement that Hamas did target Israeli civilians, but only in direct retaliation for the death of Palestinian civilians. In his thinking, this was a necessary tactic to "show the Israelis they could not get away without a price for killing our people." In June 2003, after visiting al-Rantisi in hospital after a failed Israeli missile attack against him, Yassin told reporters: "Israel is targeting Palestinian civilians, so Israeli civilians should be targeted. From now on, all Israeli people are targets. We got Israel's message. They should now expect the answer."

=== Views on Jews ===
In an interview, likely recorded in the 1990s, Ahmed Yassin stated his view on Jews:

"We don't hate Jews and fight Jews because they are Jewish. They are a people of faith and we are a people of faith, and we love all people of faith. If my brother, from my own mother and father and my own faith takes my homes and expels me from it, I will fight him. I will fight my cousin if he takes my home and expels me from it. So when a Jew takes my home and expels me from it, I will fight him. I don't fight other countries because I want to be at peace with them, I love all people and wish peace for them, even the Jews. The Jews lived with us all of our lives and we never assaulted them, and they held high positions in government and ministries. But if they take my home and make me a refugee like 4 million Palestinians in exile? Who has more right to this land? The Russian immigrant who left this land 2000 years ago or the one who left 40 years ago? We don't hate the Jews, we only ask for them to give us our rights."

In a 1997 speech, Yassin said:

I want to proclaim loudly to the world that we are not fighting Jews because they are Jews! We are fighting them because they assaulted us, they killed us, they took our land, our homes, our children, our women, they scattered us, we became scattered everywhere, a people without a homeland. We want our rights. We don't want more. We love peace, but they hate the peace, because people who take away the rights of others don't believe in peace. Why should we not fight? We have our right to defend ourselves.

=== Views on the peace process ===
Yassin's views on the peace process between the Palestinians and the Israelis were ambiguous. He supported armed resistance against Israel and asserted that Palestine is an Islamic land "consecrated for future Muslim generations until Judgment Day" and that no Arab leader had the right to give up any part of this territory. Concerning that territorial conflict, Yassin's rhetoric did not distinguish between Israelis and Jews, at one point stating that "reconciliation with the Jews is a crime." However, he regarded them as his religious cousins, stating that his conflict with them is purely over land he deemed stolen territory.

Yassin's rhetoric was often scrutinized in the news media. On one occasion, he opined that Israel "must disappear from the map." Yassin's declaration that "We chose this road, and will end with martyrdom or victory" later became a repeated mantra among Palestinians.

Yassin on several occasions proposed long-term ceasefire agreements, or truces, so called hudnas, in exchange for Israeli concessions. All such offers were rejected by Israel. Following his release from Israeli prison in 1997, he proposed a ten-year truce in exchange for total Israeli withdrawal from the West Bank, including East Jerusalem, and Gaza and a stop to Israeli attacks on civilians. In 1999, in an interview with an Egyptian newspaper, he again offered a truce:

We have to be realistic. We are talking about a homeland that was stolen a long time ago in 1948 and again in 1967. My generation today is telling the Israelis, 'Let's solve this problem now, on the basis of the 1967 borders. Let's end this conflict by declaring a temporary ceasefire. Let's leave the bigger issue for future generations to decide.' The Palestinians will decide in the future about the nature of relations with Israel, but it must be a democratic decision.

It was shortly after once such truce offer, in January 2004, that Yassin was assassinated.

== Assassination ==
Yassin was killed in an Israeli attack on 22 March 2004. While he was being wheeled out of an early morning prayer session in Gaza City, an Israeli AH-64 Apache helicopter gunship fired Hellfire missiles at Yassin and both of his assistants. Before the attack, Israeli F-16 jets flew overhead to obscure the noise of the approaching helicopters. Yassin always used the same direction every morning to go to the same mosque in the Sabra district that is 100 m (330 ft) from his home.

Yassin and two of his assistants were killed instantly, along with six passers-by. Another 12 people were injured in the operation, including two of Yassin's sons. Abdel Aziz al-Rantisi, Yassin's deputy, became the Hamas leader after his assassination, but was also killed shortly thereafter.

=== Reactions ===
Kofi Annan, UN Secretary General, condemned the killing. The UN Commission on Human Rights passed a resolution condemning the killing supported by votes from 31 countries including the People's Republic of China, India, Indonesia, Russia, and South Africa, with 2 votes against and 18 abstentions. The Arab League council also expressed condemnation, as did the African Union.

A draft resolution condemning the extrajudicial execution of Yassin and six other Palestinians, as well as all terrorist attacks against civilians was brought before the United Nations Security Council and vetoed by the United States, with United Kingdom, Germany, and Romania abstaining. The United States explained that the draft resolution should have condemned Hamas explicitly following its sponsored suicide bombings in Ashdod the week before.

==== Palestine ====
The Palestinian Authority declared three days of mourning and closed Palestinian schools. Hamas official Ismail Haniyeh suggested, "This is the moment Sheikh Yassin dreamed about". The Hamas leadership said Ariel Sharon had "opened the gates of hell". Hamas called for retaliation against Israel. About 200,000 people took to the streets of the Gaza Strip for Yassin's funeral as Israeli forces declared a national alert.

The assassination of Yassin also led to the fact that Hamas, for the first time, was named as the most popular movement in Palestine by the residents of the West Bank and Gaza Strip two weeks after the assassination.

Abdel Aziz Rantisi was announced as the new head of Hamas. At a memorial service for Sheik Yassin, he declared that "The Israelis will not know security... We will fight them until the liberation of Palestine, the whole of Palestine." Publicly addressing the military wing of Hamas, the Al-Qassam Brigades, Rantisi suggested, "The door is open for you to strike all places, all the time and using all means." Rantisi was himself killed by Israel on 17 April 2004 in an assassination almost identical to that of Yassin. He was killed by three rockets fired from a gunship by the Israeli military.

On 31 August 2004, at least 15 Israeli people were killed and 80 injured in a suicide attack against two Israeli buses in Beersheba. Hamas stated the attack was a revenge for the assassination of Rantisi and Yassin. Following the bombing, an estimated 20,000 Hamas supporters in Gaza took to Gaza's streets, celebrating the successful attack.

==== Israel ====
The Israeli government said the targeted killing was in response to dozens of suicide attacks by Hamas against Israeli civilians. The Israeli Ministry of Foreign Affairs defended the assassination of Yassin:

Yassin was the dominant authority of the Hamas leadership, which was directly involved in planning, orchestrating and launching terror attacks carried out by the organization. In this capacity, Yassin personally gave his approval for the launching of Qassam rockets against Israeli cities, as well as for the numerous Hamas terrorist bombings and suicide operations. In his public appearances and interviews, Yassin called repeatedly for a continuation of the 'armed struggle' against Israel, and for an intensification of the terrorist campaign against its citizens. The successful operation against Yassin constitutes a significant blow to a central pillar of the Hamas terrorist organization, and a major setback to its terrorist infrastructure.

Shaul Mofaz, the Israeli Defense Minister, branded Yassin "the Palestinian Bin Laden" and said, "If we have to balance how many more terrorists Yassin would have sent, how many terror attacks he would have approved, if we weigh this on the scales, we acted rightly".

Avraham Poraz, Israel's Interior Minister and member of the centrist Shinui party, said he believed the assassination of Yassin "was a bad idea because I am afraid of a revenge coming from the Palestinian side, from the Hamas side." Shimon Peres, then leader of the Labour opposition, was critical of the assassination, suggesting that it "could lead to an escalation of terror".

==== Middle East ====
King Abdullah II of Jordan described the assassination as a "crime"; Lebanon's president Émile Lahoud vehemently denounced the Israeli act as "...a crime [which] will not succeed in liquidating the Palestinian cause"; Emir of Kuwait Sabah Al-Ahmad Al-Jaber Al-Sabah said: "Violence will increase now because violence always breeds violence"; the head of the Muslim Brotherhood in Egypt, Mohammed Akef, described Yassin as a "martyr" and his assassination a "cowardly operation". Iran called the assassination a "criminal act" and a threat to regional security.

==== Western world ====
Jack Straw, then British Foreign Secretary, said: "All of us understand Israel's need to protect itself – and it is fully entitled to do that – against the terrorism which affects it, within international law. But it is not entitled to go in for this kind of unlawful killing and we condemn it. It is unacceptable, it is unjustified and it is very unlikely to achieve its objectives." The European Union's foreign policy head Javier Solana expressed concern that it might impede the peace process.

In response to a question about the killing, U.S. President George W. Bush responded:

As far as the Middle East, it's a troubled region, and the attacks were troubling. There needs to be a focused, concerted effort by all parties to fight terror. Any country has a right to defend itself from terror. Israel has the right to defend herself from terror. And as she does so, I hope she keeps consequences in mind as to how to make sure we stay on the path to peace.

United States Representative to the United Nations John Negroponte stated that the United States was "deeply troubled by this action by the Government of Israel", while asserting that the U.S. would not support any U.N. Security Council statement condemning Israel's assassination of Yassin that did not include a condemnation of "Hamas terrorist attacks". According to his statement to the UN Security Council,

The killing of Sheikh Yassin has escalated tensions in Gaza and the greater Middle East, and sets back our effort to resume progress towards peace. However, events must be considered in their context and as we consider the killing of Sheikh Yassin, we must keep in mind the facts. Sheikh Ahmed Yassin was the leader of a terrorist organization, one which has proudly taken credit for indiscriminate attacks against civilians, including most recently an attack last week in the Port of Ashdod, which left 10 Israelis dead. He preached hatred, and glorified suicide bombings of buses, restaurants, and cafes. Yassin was opposed to the existence of the State of Israel, and actively sought to undermine a two-state solution in the Middle East.

== Published works ==
Sheikh Yassin had published the following books:

Year	Title (Arabic transliteration)	English title	Notes
1993	al-Mawqif al-naẓarī wa-l-ʿamalī li-l-ḥarakāt al-islāmiyya tujāh mawḍūʿ al-ʿumalāʾ: al-Shaykh Aḥmad Yāsīn yataḥaddathu min zanzanatihi ʿan qaṭl al-ʿumalāʾ	Theoretical and Practical Position of Islamic Movements toward the Issue of Collaborators: Shaykh Ahmad Yasin Speaks from His Prison Cell on the Killing of Collaborators	Political-religious tract
2003	al-Shaykh Aḥmad Yāsīn – shāhid ʿalā ʿaṣr al-Intifāḍa	Sheikh Ahmad Yasin: A Witness to the Era of the Intifada	Interview with Al Jazeera's Ahmed Mansour

== See also ==
- Muslim Brotherhood
