= Smena =

Smena (meaning "change", "replacement" in several Slavic languages) may refer to:

== Sports ==
- Smena Minsk, Belarusian football club
- FC Smena Komsomolsk-na-Amure, Russian football club
- FC Smena-Zenit, Russian football club
- DYuSSh Smena-Zenit, Rudssian soccer academy

== Other ==
- Smena (camera), Soviet camera brand
- Smena (Slovak newspaper) , Slovak language newspaper in 1995 taken over by Sme
- Smena (Soviet newspaper), Soviet Russian-language youth newspaper
- Smena (magazine) a periodical in Russia
