= Mashpriborintorg =

- Company type: Joint-stock company
- Industry: Import/Export
- Founded: 1959
- Headquarters: Moscow, Russia
- Parent: Ruselectronics
- Website: mashpriborintorg.com

Foreign Economic Association Mashpriborintorg (Russian: Внешнеэкономическое объединение Машприборинторг) is a Russian (formerly Soviet) import-export company, dealing in high-tech equipment and machinery. It is currently part of Ruselectronics.

During the late 1950s and 1960s and 1970s, Mashpriborintorg exported millions of units of photographic and cinematic equipment to about 74 countries worldwide. According to the USSR Ministry of Foreign Trade magazine issued 1996 'Mashpriborintorg of the State of the Russian Federation for Defence Branches of Industry' is "a leading exporter and importer of electronic and communications equipment for the civilian and special designation".

Mashpriborintorg, Stankoimport, Avtopromimport, Tekmashimport and Tekhnopromimport are the top companies of the Soviet/Russian trade system.

== History ==
Mashpriborintorg was founded in the Soviet Union in October 1959 as Foreign Economic Association Mashpriborintorg. In 1991 after the fall of the Soviet Union it was re-registered as Federal State Unitary Enterprise "VO" Mashpriborintorg.

Although it was part of the Soviet Trade Ministry, it is not known if it was under the direct control of the ministry or a separate entity. In the period between 1960-1980 it was one of the largest industry associations of the USSR. Between 1960 and 1975 it was the only export company in Russia and had exported nine million radios, radio-record player sets and televisions to over ninety countries worldwide.

It participated as a supplier of the 1980 Moscow Olympics. During the period between 1960-1980 it was the main exporter of Smena and Zenit cameras to the West. It also exported precision microscopes to Japanese companies such as Sony, Sumitomo, Canon and Toshiba.

In 1991 it reorganised. In September 2004 by decree No. 1009 of the President of the Russian Federation it was included in the list of strategic Russian companies which made it exempt from corporatization.

== Current activities ==
Mashpriborintorg currently imports and exports telecommunications equipment, radios, television and acoustic equipment, computers, electronic components, spare parts for civil aircraft and helicopters, autonomous power systems and products and spare parts for manufacturing plants.

== Branches ==
Mashpriborintorg is composed of the following international trade companies and departments:

- Mashpriborintorg-Akustika Co. Ltd. dealing with the import and export of home audio equipment.
- Mashpriborkom Co. Ltd. dealing with the import of telecommunication facilities including trunk lines.
- Mashpriborintorg Signal Co. Ltd. dealing with the import and export of radio and telecommunications equipment.
