= Zenit (camera) =

Soviet camera company

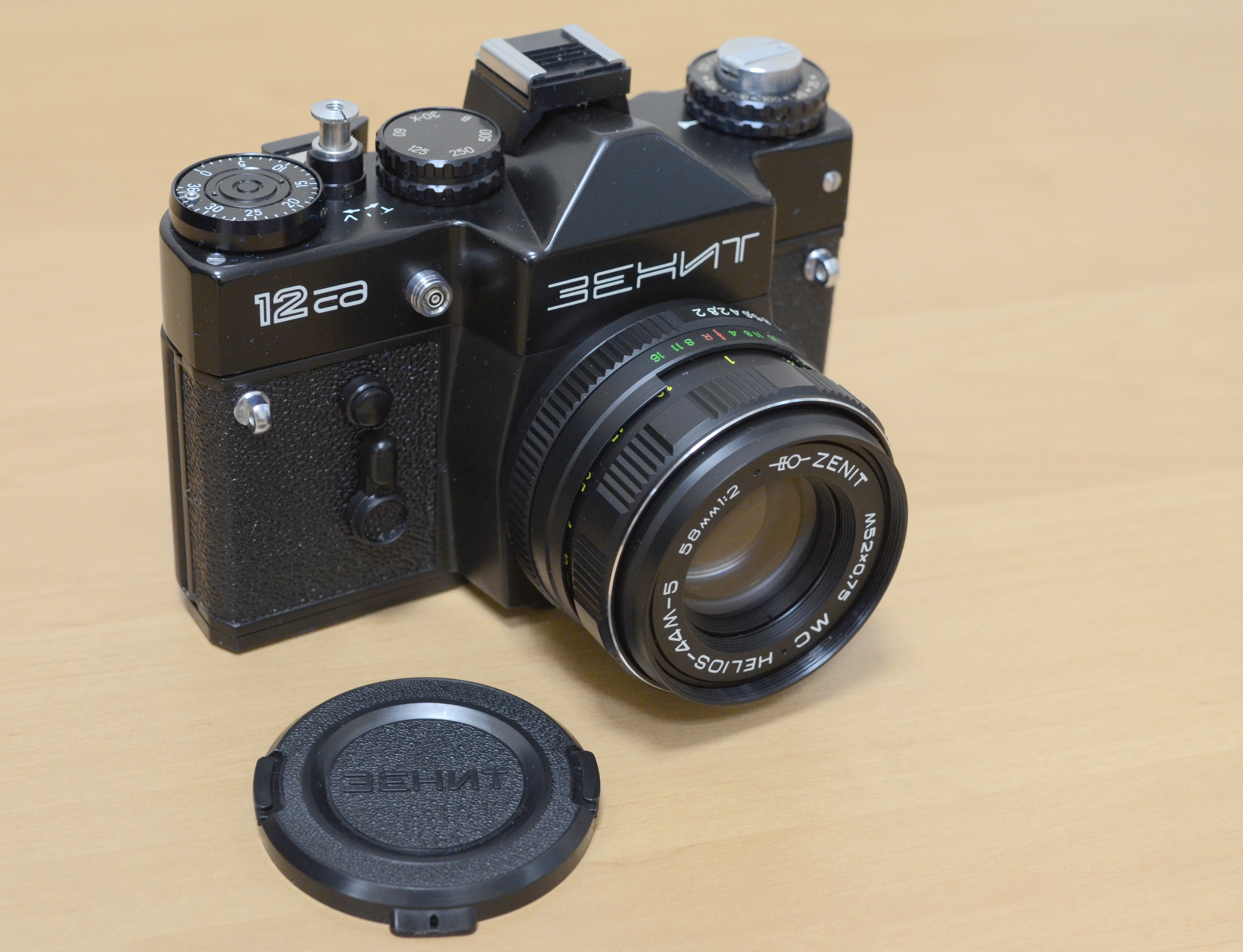
ZENIT 12SD (12XP)

Zenit (Russian: Зени́т) is a Soviet camera brand manufactured by KMZ in the town of Krasnogorsk near Moscow since 1952 and by BelOMO in Belarus since the 1970s. The Zenit trademark is associated with 35 mm SLR cameras. Among related brands are Zorki (Watchful) for 35 mm rangefinder cameras, Moskva (Moscow) and Iskra (Spark) for medium-format folding cameras and Horizon for panoramic cameras. In the 1960s and 1970s, they were exported by Mashpriborintorg to 74 countries.

The name is sometimes spelled Zenith in English, such as the manuals published by the UK Zenit-importer TOE. However, TOE's imported camera bodies as from 1963 retained the "Zenit" badges. The early Zorki-based models before that time were labelled "Zenith" in a handwritten style of script.

== History ==
=== Early years ===
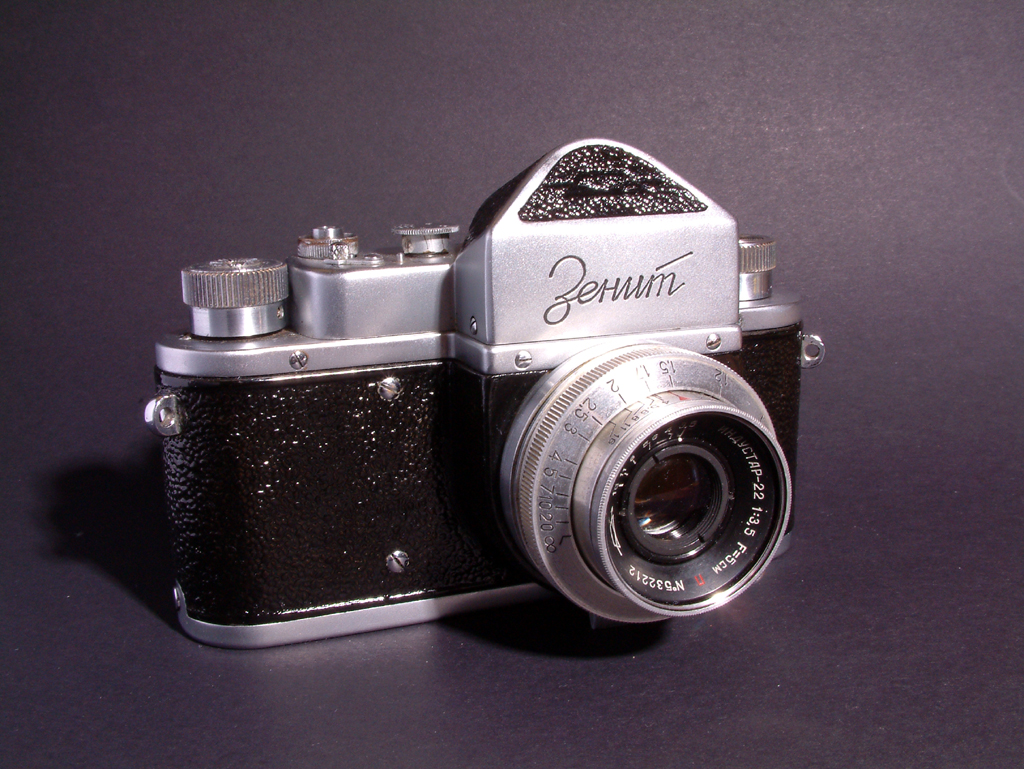
Zenit, first model, 1952

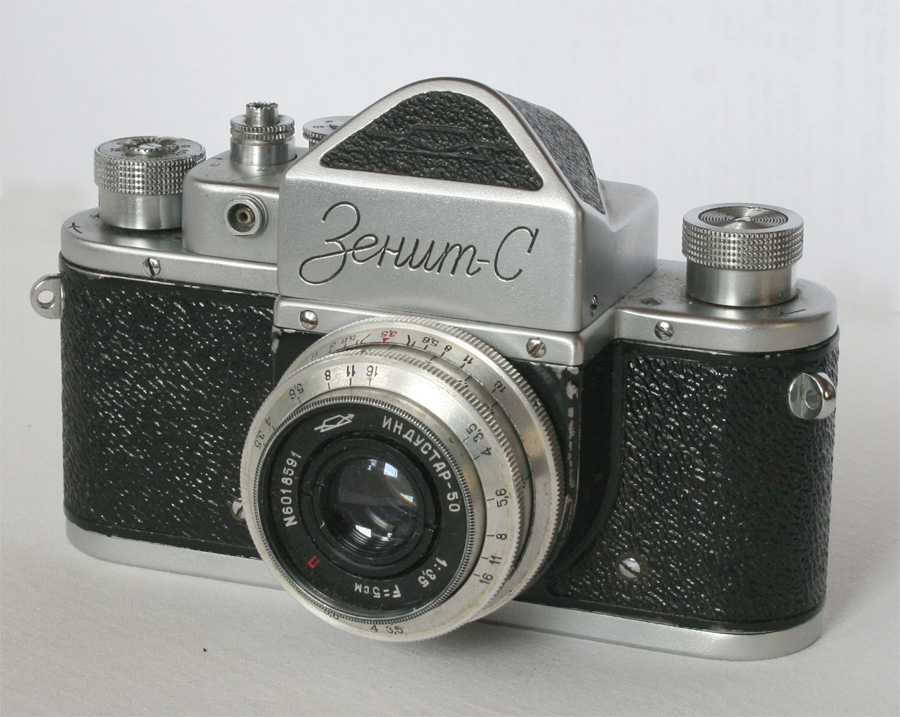
Zenit-S (Synchronized), 1955

The above Zenit was based on the Zorki rangefinder camera (a copy of the Leica II). In transforming the Zorki into an SLR, the simplest approach was taken: the rangefinder housing was removed from the top and replaced by a plain ground-glass screen and prism; a mirror was added below with a lever operated mirror setting system and the M39×1 thread mount was pushed forward to make room for the mirror inside.

During the first years of production (until the Zenit-E of 1967) Zenit camera development coincided with that of the Zorki cameras. The Zenit-S had PC-synchro for external flash units (almost like the Zorki-S) and the Zenit-3M also had an RF-sibling, the Zorki-6. For an SLR, the Pentaprism of all classical Zenits was undersize, with the viewfinder showing about two-thirds of the actual frame-size. On the Zenit-S the mirror setting lever mechanism of the original Zenit was replaced by a cord and pulley system.

=== Zenit-E and its successors ===
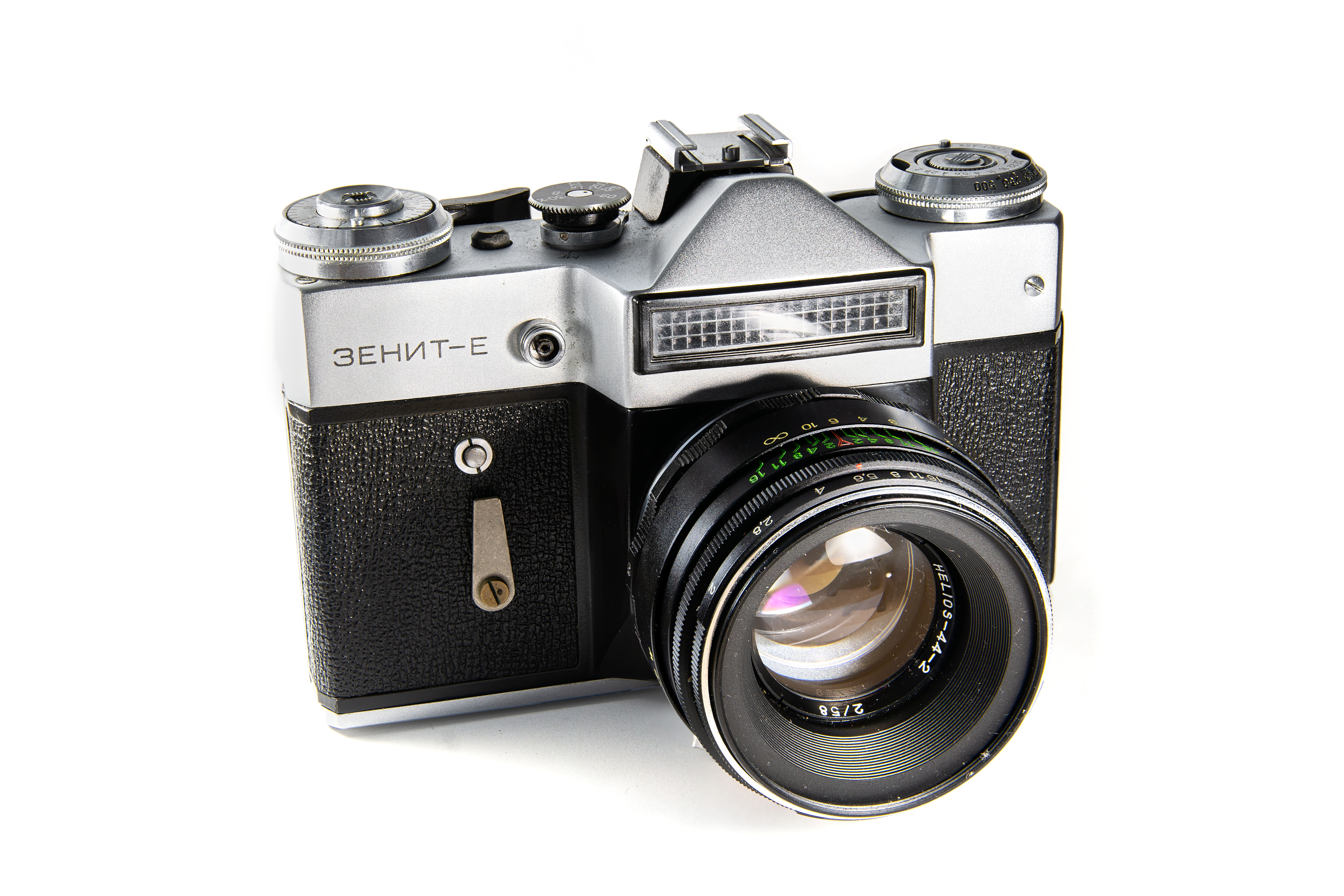
Zenit E with Helios 44-2 lens and selenium-cell lightmeter

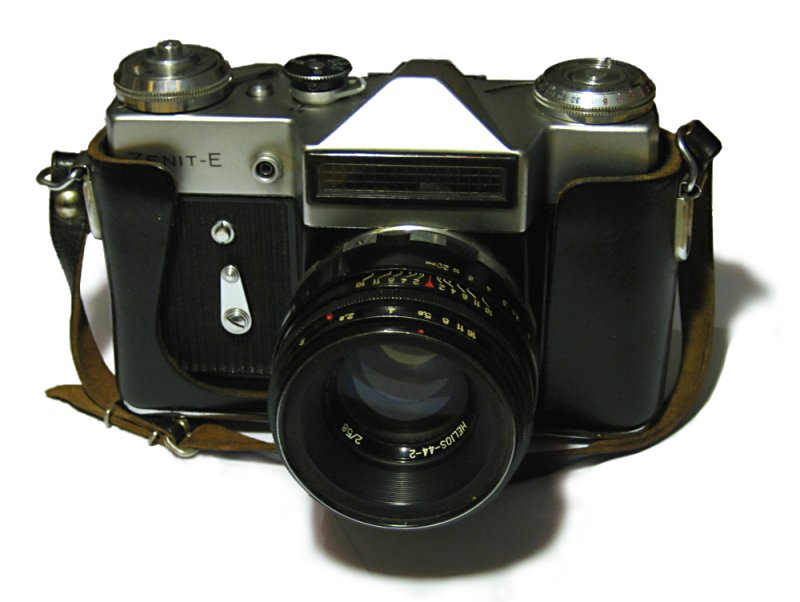
Zenit E with Helios 44-2 lens, made in 1971

During 1967 through 1969 KMZ built an automatic die-cast moulding line, allowing mass camera production. Camera production switched to the M42×1 thread (also known as Praktica thread) and an instant-return mirror was also developed. This led to one of the most famous Zenits — Zenit-E which saw (including its subtypes) over 12 million produced. A heavy and tough camera which gained a reputation of being ‘bomb proof’, with a mechanism that was of exceedingly simple design along the lines of "what isn't there, can't go wrong". Automatic diaphragm functionality was not available until the introduction of the Zenit-EM, which used a direct mechanism linking the shutter release button to the aperture mechanism, significantly increasing the effort required to release the shutter. Production included both M39×1 and M42×1 mounts for the Zenit E and Zenit B models. Later models were only produced in the M42×1 with the Pentax K mount available for the latest models.

Towards the end of the 20th century, the Zenit-E heritage became an obstacle to the development of more modern Zenit models. This was because almost all low-end Zenits until the recent 412DX have been based on the Zenit-E die-cast chassis, complying with the local philosophy that a crude but affordable camera was better than no camera. The major events of the further development of Zenit-E line was:

- Introduction of an automatic 'jumping' diaphragm on the Zenit-EM
- TTL metering system (instead of a non-coupled Selenium-cell lightmeter) on the Zenit-TTL
- Switching to the Pentax K mount — Zenit-122K
- DX-code introduction (instead of manual ISO-speed switch) — Zenit-412DX

The Zenit-E was also sold with the Moscow 1980 Olympics emblem.

=== Advanced models ===
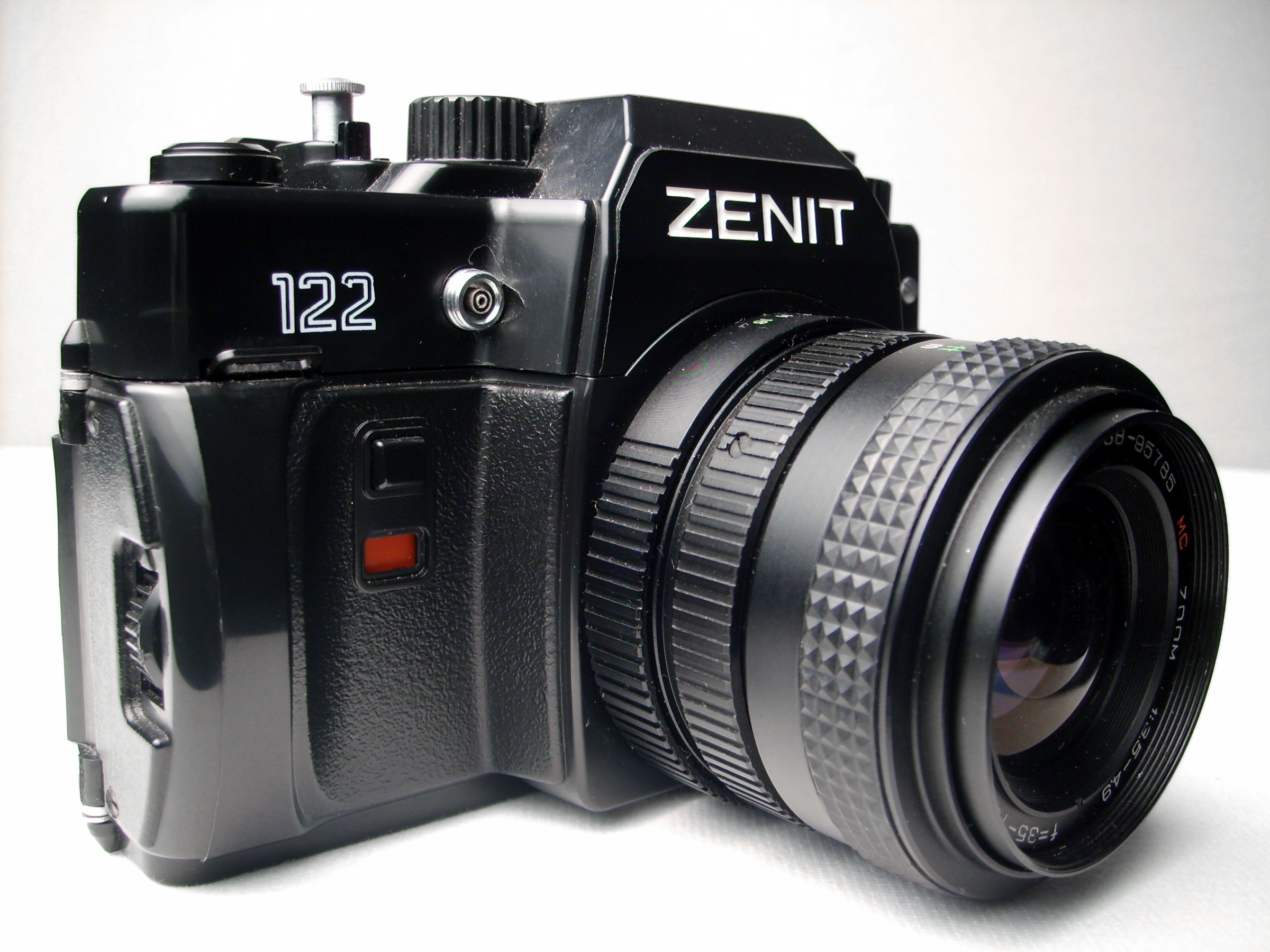
Zenit 122

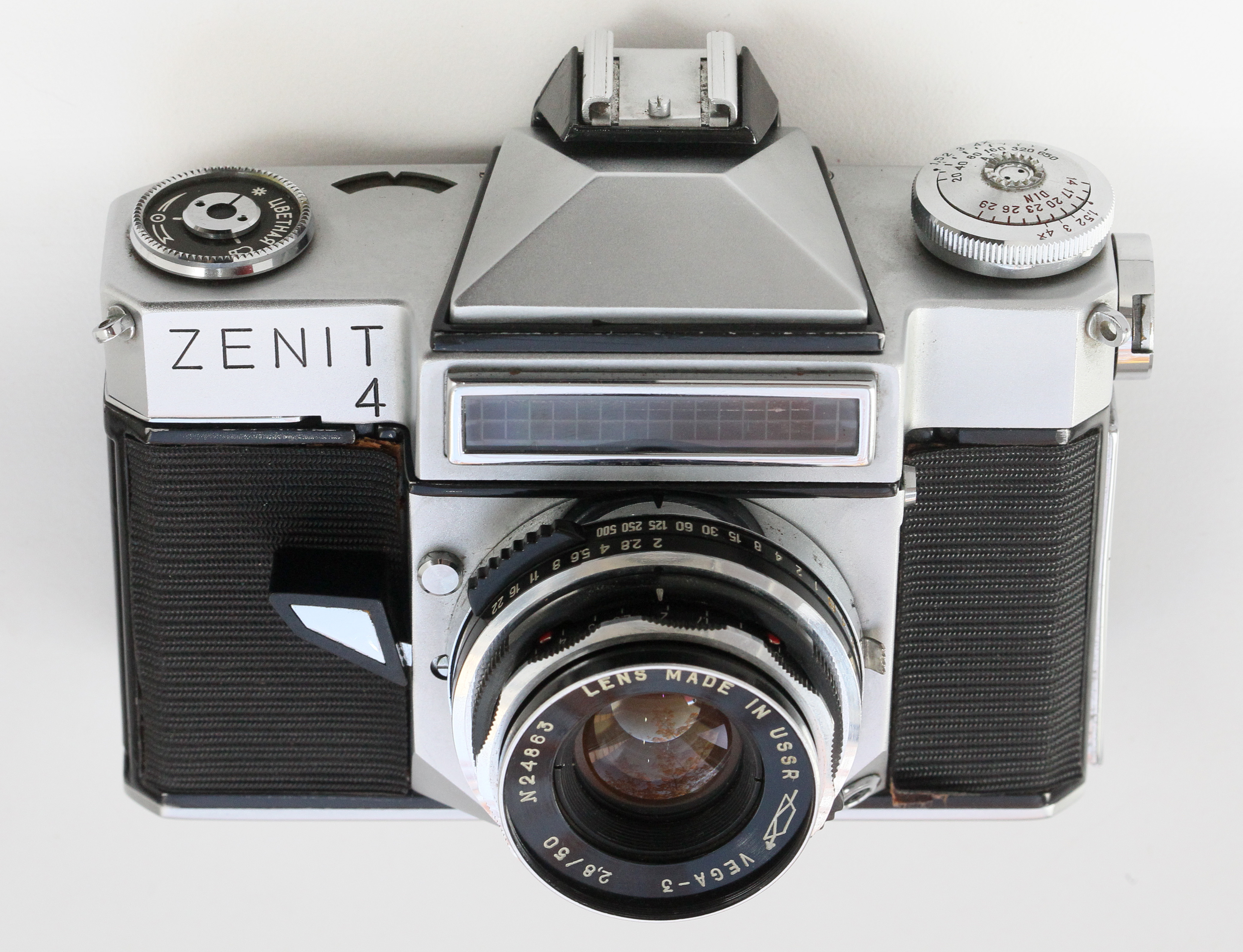
Zenit-4 with leaf shutter

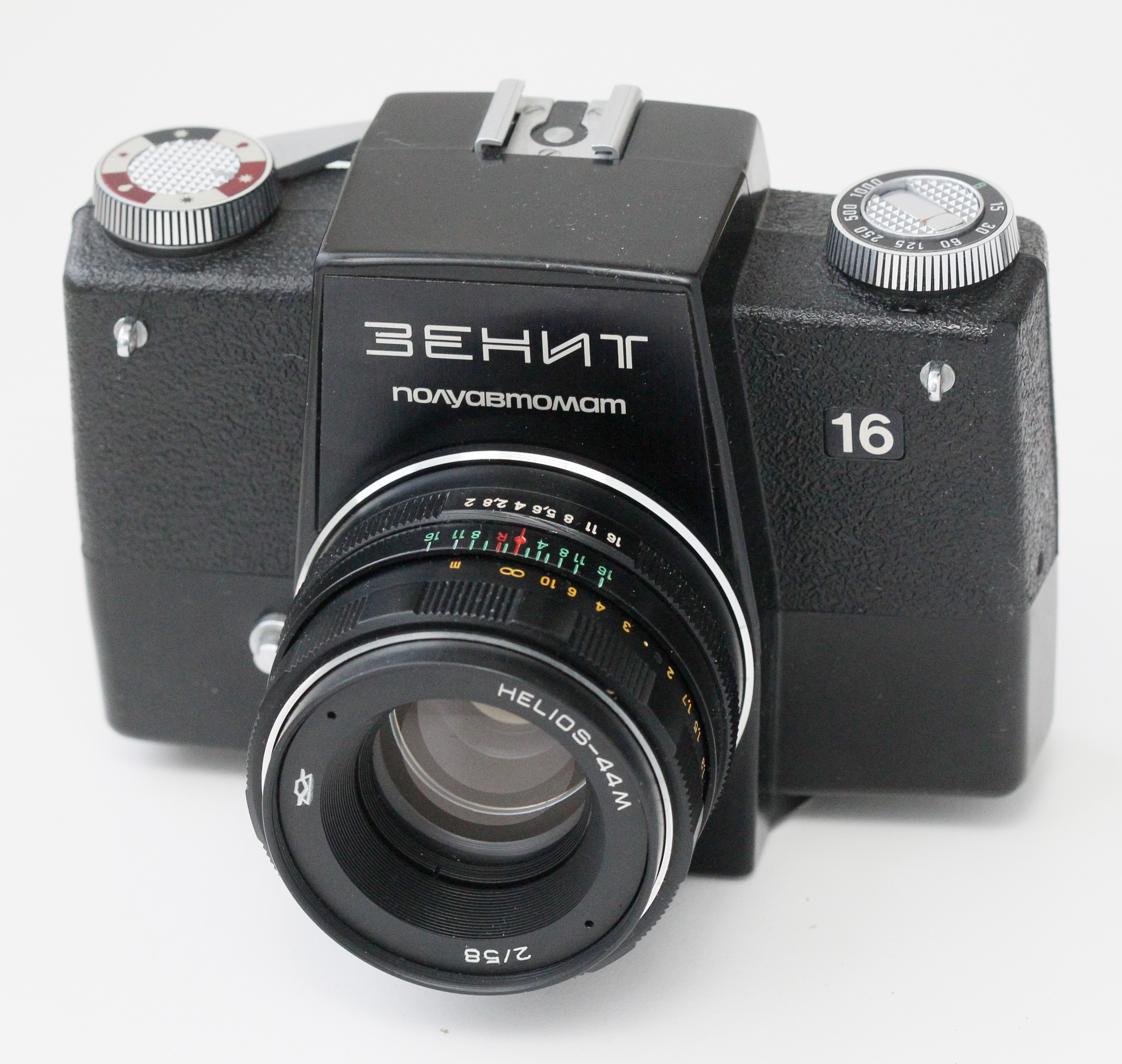
Zenit-16 with vertical travel shutter

The first attempt to make high-end professional camera by KMZ was the Start in 1958. This camera had a full set of shutter speeds (from 1 sec to 1/1000), a lens with an automatic diaphragm in a unique breech-lock mount, and even a knife for cutting-off part of the unexposed film. The photographer could choose between a pentaprism and waist-level finders. The grave disadvantage of the Start is blamed on lack of lenses; only one lens (the Helios-44 f2/58) was ever made for the proprietary Start mount directly.

With the success of the Zeiss-Ikon Contaflex of the mid-1950s and its follow-ups in form of the Bessamatic, Retina- and Paxette-reflex, Zenit's next attempt was the Zenit-4 (1964), -5 and -6 cameras. These were based on a Voigtländer Bessamatic-type mount with Compur-type iris-shutter near the lens elements. The poor durability and high manufacturing cost of this concept in contrast to the classical barebone Zenit design based on ultimate simplicity showed KMZ to have taken a wrong track: Nevertheless, the Zenit-5 was the first electric motor-driven SLR camera in the world, and the first Soviet zoom lens (Rubin-1c 2.8/37–80, based on Voigtländer Zoomar design) featured in the Zenit-6.

Following this, there were two more attempts to make high-end photographic equipment, namely the Zenit-7 (1968) and Zenit-D (1969). Both were based on the completely new cloth-curtain shutter construction. The Zenit-D had automatic exposure mode. Its shutter was sped up to achieve X-sync at 1/125. Each of these had its own bayonet mount ("mount 7" and "mount D" respectively) which helped to utilize the camera's most advanced features. There were plans to develop a full line of optics for these cameras but the new shutter was too complicated and unreliable. Production was cancelled shortly after, and the only lens made for new mounts were the standard types. The Start, Zenit-7 and Zenit-D utilized the same normal lens — a Helios-44 2/58. The Zenit-D is one of the rarest Zenit cameras — only 63 cameras were produced.

The Zenit 12-XP With its Helios f2/58mm lens and cloth shutter was widely sold by US Eastern camera stores. Many with the Zenit name covered with their "USA" brand. This Metallic re-badge was easy enough to gently pry off to see the true name Zenit. The TTL meter was fairly accurate and took decent shots. The 1981 price was $110 usa. The Russians believed that 58mm more closely matched the Human normal range than the standard 50mm used worldwide as a normal lens. It also had a T setting for timed exposures making it a good choice for yearly fireworks displays. The "T" setting locked the shutter open allowing a tripod mounted camera to be used with an index card to manually open for few bursts of fire works and then close and reset.

After one more unsuccessful camera (Zenit-16) which was produced in very small quantities, in 1979 production of the Zenit-19 began. This was a camera with an original electromagnet-driven focal-plane shutter, M42 lens mount, and shutter speeds from 1 sec to 1/1000. X-sync at 1/60 or 1/125 (camera was modified during production). The camera has only manual shooting mode (with a TTL-meter and a needle indicator of the proper exposition in the viewfinder). The Zenit-19 was, perhaps, the top-of-the-line Soviet M42 lens mount camera.

=== Pentax-K mount series ===
In 1984 the Zenit-automat entered production. This had a Pentax K mount (which was proposed as an open standard by Pentax and distributed freely) and a focal shutter with horizontal-travel cloth curtains. The only operation mode was aperture-priority. The camera was modified in 1988, to include shutter FZL-84 with vertical-travel metal curtains, and was reissued as the Zenit-AM. The Zenit-AM2 was a cheaper version of the AM without the self-timer.

Next in line was the Zenit-APK. Its distinguishing feature was the introduction of a manual shutter mode in addition to aperture-priority. The original FZL-84 shutter was also changed to a licensed 'Copal Square' shutter.

The most recent model is the Zenit-KM of 2001. This is the second microprocessor-controlled camera in the Zenit range (the first one was the second variant of the Zenit-automat camera), and the second (after the Zenit-5) motor-driven SLR camera built by KMZ. Shutter speeds range from 1/2000 to 1 sec (and up to 16 sec in Auto mode). X-sync is 1/125 sec, and the camera includes both manual shutter and aperture-priority modes as well as DX-coding from 50 to 3200 ISO. In 2004, the KM received some improvements and was renamed to the Zenit-KM Plus

The Zenit-KM Plus was the final Zenit camera model produced; by 2005, all SLR camera production at the Krasnogorsk factory had ceased. It has been suggested that earlier iterations of Zenit cameras might have been commercially successful in Western markets during the peak popularity of SLR cameras in the 1970s. However, they appeared at a time when their market-segment was saturated with second-hand equipment, which may have limited their commercial prospects. One of the characteristics of Soviet camera manufacture was that the capability of its designers was well ahead of that of its policy-makers. The 20-year overdue replacement of the external selenium cell of the Zenit E by TTL-metering is said to be the work of an employee who made a conversion on his own accord.

=== Soviet Export Policy ===
In the West, the success of the Zenit line can be focused on the United Kingdom, primarily due to the marketing activity and service of TOE, and secondly the originally heavy UK tax-load of up to two-thirds on imported precision cameras. Substantial quantities were later sold by German discounters like Foto-Quelle and Neckermann. The main criticism of the USSR exporters at the time was that they could only supply hopelessly outdated equipment like the Zenit E that they had been directed to produce in quantity, despite having the capacity to produce more technically advanced products that might have been attractive to Western buyers. TOE were fighting a constant battle with their USSR-suppliers in this direction, having to fill the gap left by the excellent but not-for-export Soviet lenses which would have been a major selling-point, by a hodge-podge selection of second-rate mass-market optics from Japan, albeit under the "Helios" label.

=== Standard Zenit Lenses ===
The original Zenit came with the sturdy click-stop four-element 3.5/50mm Zeiss Tessar copy under the "Industar" designation. Early aluminium variants made in several different bodies were finely blue-coated, whereas the later mass-produced black version was either partially or un-coated with no visible colour on the glass. They were sharp but gave the typically "foggy" image of an uncoated lens with bright lighting. With the iris ring sitting inside the focussing ring it was impossible to focus at full aperture followed by stopping down, as this moved the point of focus. What makes these lenses interesting is their very compact "pancake" design. The concept of the makers was to offer a sharp Tessar-type lens of the simplest possible body construction, leaving out all progress made in this field since 1945. The most prominent lens is the 6-element 2.0/58mm "Helios" based on the pre-war Zeiss Biotar (US Patent 1,786,916 (W.Merté, 1930) Zenit also manufactures several Tair lenses in different focal lengths of which some were of 4-element pre-war Zeiss Sonnar design with the cemented second and ultra-fat third element.

== Camera models ==
=== Early cameras ===
Bottom Loading

- Zenit (1953–56)
- Zenit-S (S stands for flash sync, 1955–61)
- Zenit-3 (1960–62)

Hinged Back

- Kristall/Crystal (1961–62)
- Zenit-3M (modified Kristall, 1962–70)

=== Zenit 4 line semiautomatic cameras ===
- Zenit 4
- Zenit 5
- Zenit 6

List of Zenit DKL-mount ("Байонет Ц") lenses:

- Mir-1Ц 37mm f2.8
- Vega-3 50mm f2.8
- Helios-65Ц 52mm f2.8
- Jupiter-25Ц 85mm f2.8
- Tair-38Ц 133mm f2.8
- Rubin-1Ц 37-80mm f2.8

=== Zenit-E line ===
==== Models with a Selenium cell lightmeter ====
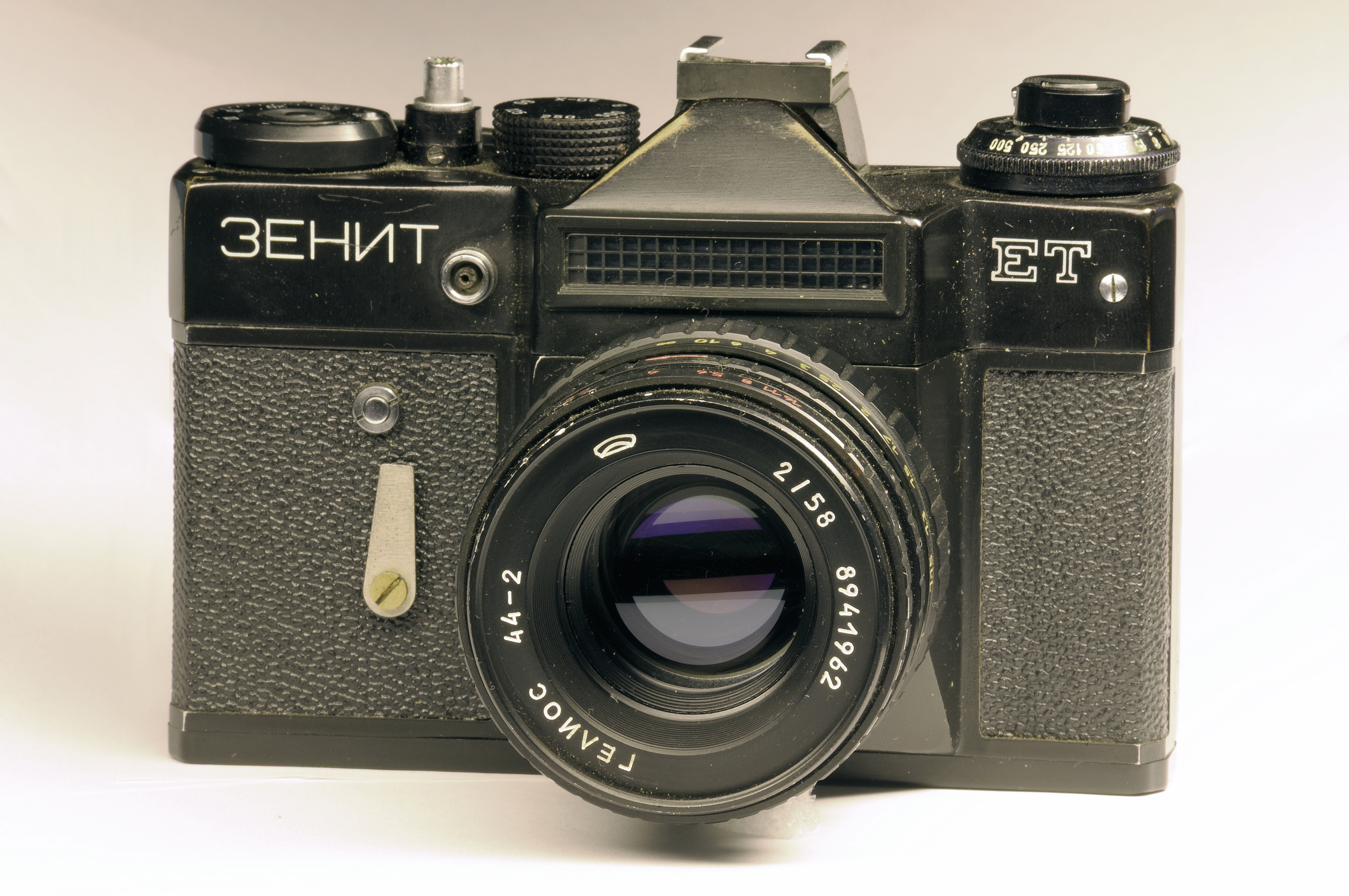
Zenit ET with Helios 44-2 lens

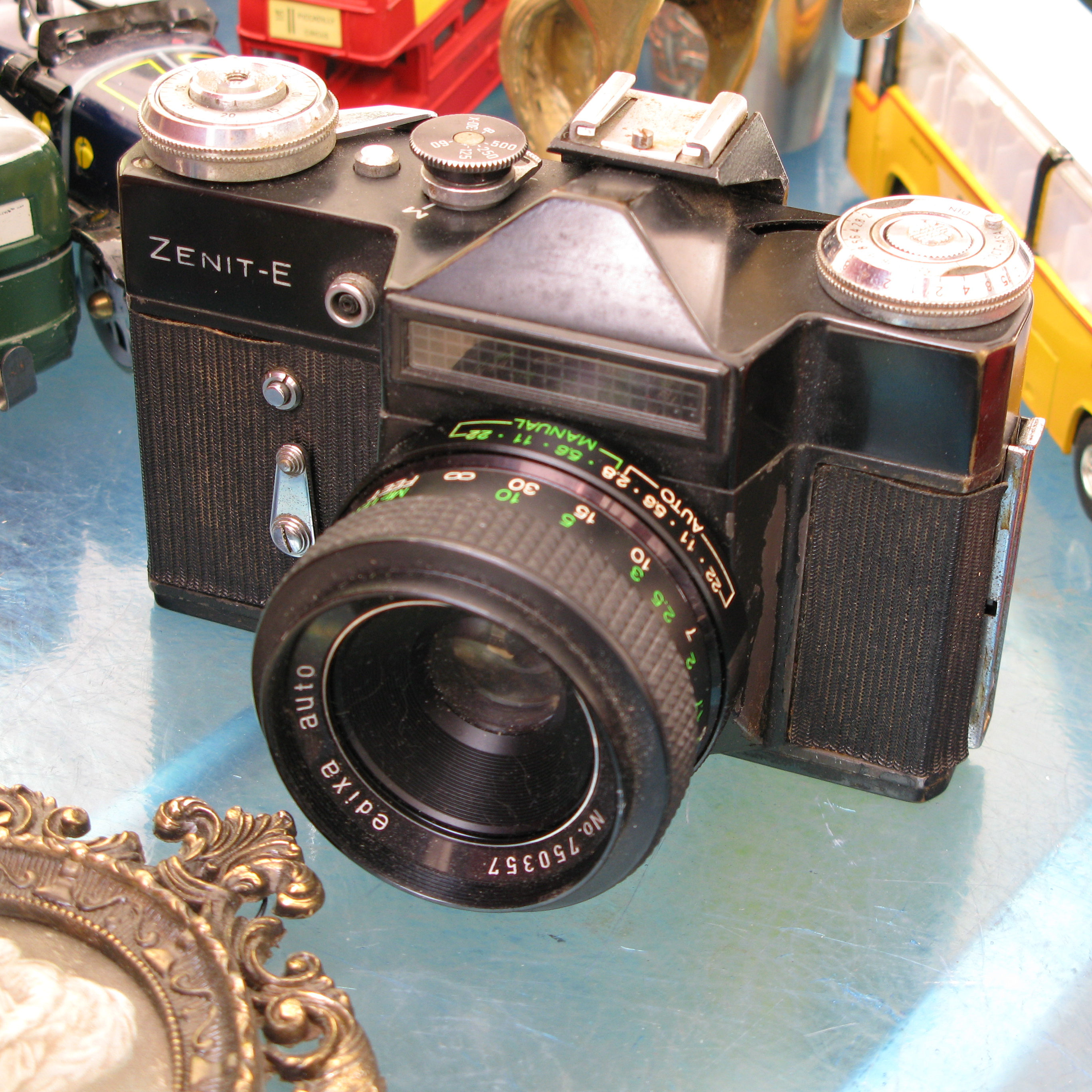
Zenit-E

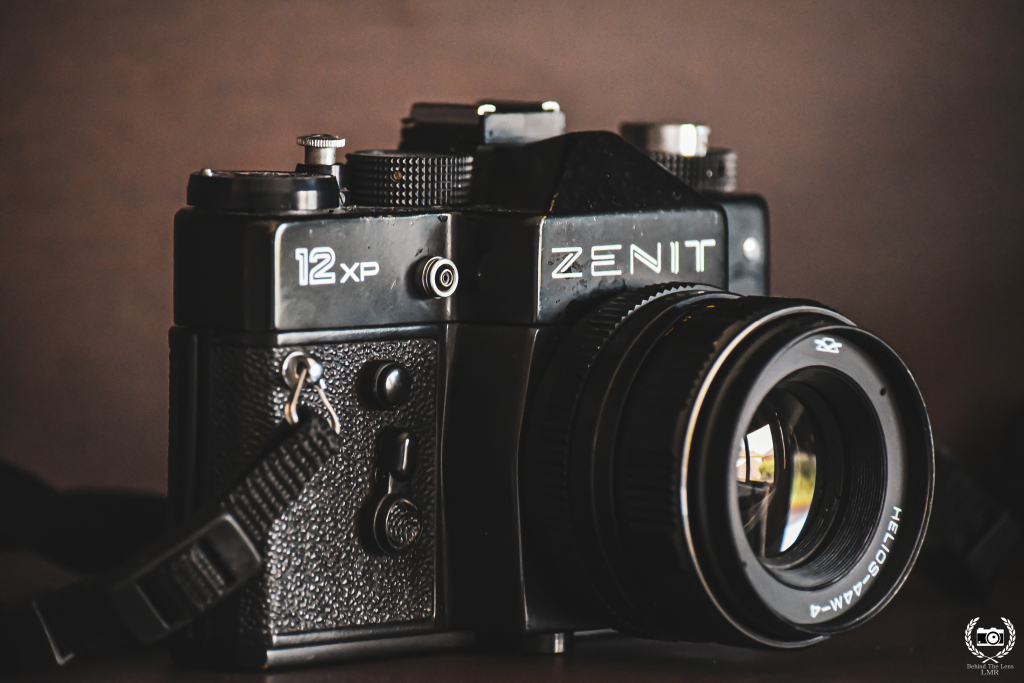
Zenit 12xp

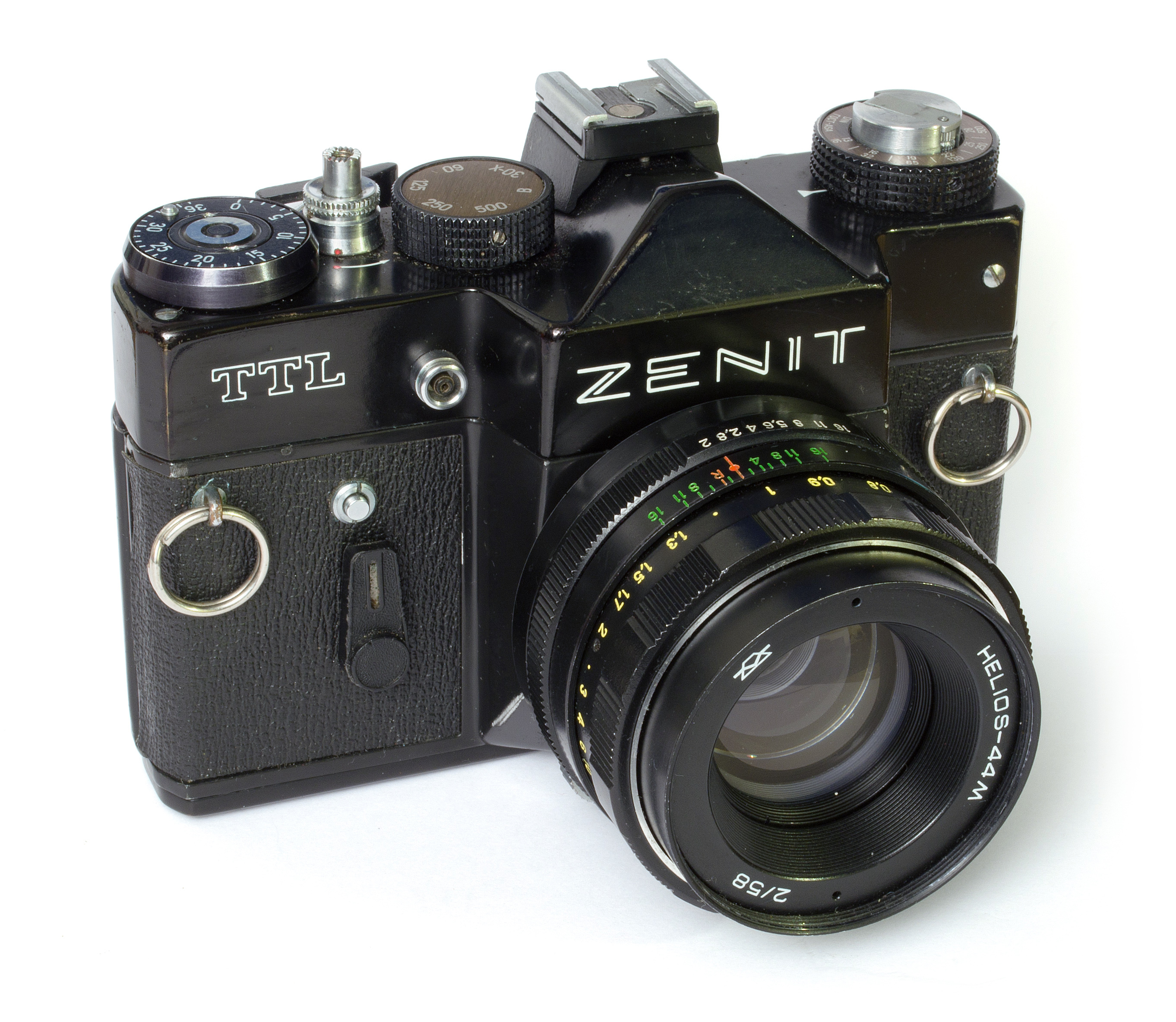
Zenit TTL

- Zenit-E
- Zenit-EM, Produced between 1972-1984 by KMZ.
- Zenit-ET
- Zenit-10
- Zenit-11

==== Models without a Selenium lightmeter ====
- Zenit-V, also known as Zenit-B (identical to the E but no lightmeter)
- Zenit-VM, also known as Zenit-BM (identical to the EM but no lightmeter)

==== Cameras with TTL-metering and M42 thread mount ====
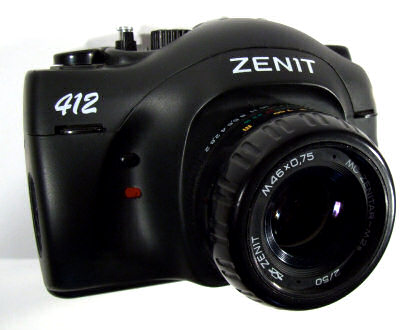
Zenit 412, one of the last models

- Zenit-TTL
- Zenit-12
- Zenit-12xp, Zenit-12sd
- Zenit-122
- Zenit-122V, also known as Zenit-122B
- Zenit-312m
- Zenit-412DX
- Zenit-412LS

==== Cameras with TTL-metering and Pentax K mount ====
- Zenit-122K
- Zenit-212K

=== Cameras with non-standard mounts ===
- Start
- Zenit-7
- Zenit-D

=== M42 semi-automatic cameras ===
- Zenit-16
- Zenit-19
- Zenit-18 automatic camera
- Zenit-MT-1 Surprise (half frame Zenit-19 variant)

=== Zenit-Ax line (Pentax K mount cameras) ===
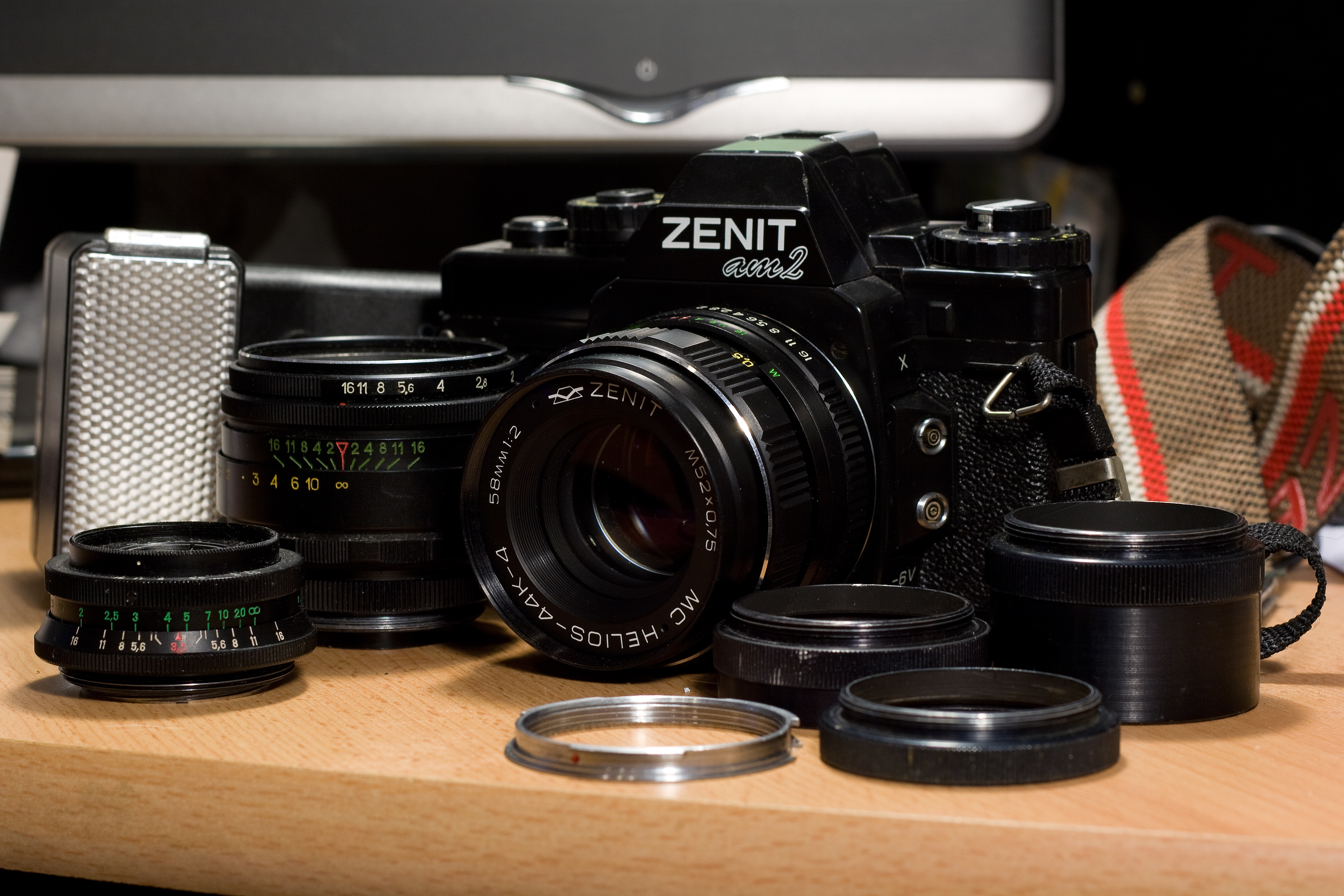
Zenit-AM-2 camera and accessories

- Zenit-Automat, also known as Zenit-Auto
- Zenit-AM
- Zenit-AM2
- Zenit-APM
- Zenit-APK
- Zenit-KM
- Zenit-KM plus
- Zenit 14 (also semi-auto)

=== Zenit-DF line (Minolta / Rokkor mount cameras made by Seagull) ===
- Zenit DF-2, same as the Seagull DF-2
- Zenit DF-2ETM, same as the Seagull DF-2ETM
- Zenit DF-300, same as the Seagull DF-300
- Zenit DF-300x, same as the Seagull DF-300x2

=== Photosniper ===
One oddity of the Zenit camera range is the so-called FotoSnaiper (or Photosniper) kit, which consists of a case (either leather or metal) a gunstock and shoulderstock, filters, a 300 mm f4.5 Tair-3 lens, a normal lens and a Zenit adapted for the gunstock (recognizable by the s designation, Zenit-ES, 122s etc.). The camera is actually held in the same manner as a rifle; hence the name "Photosniper".

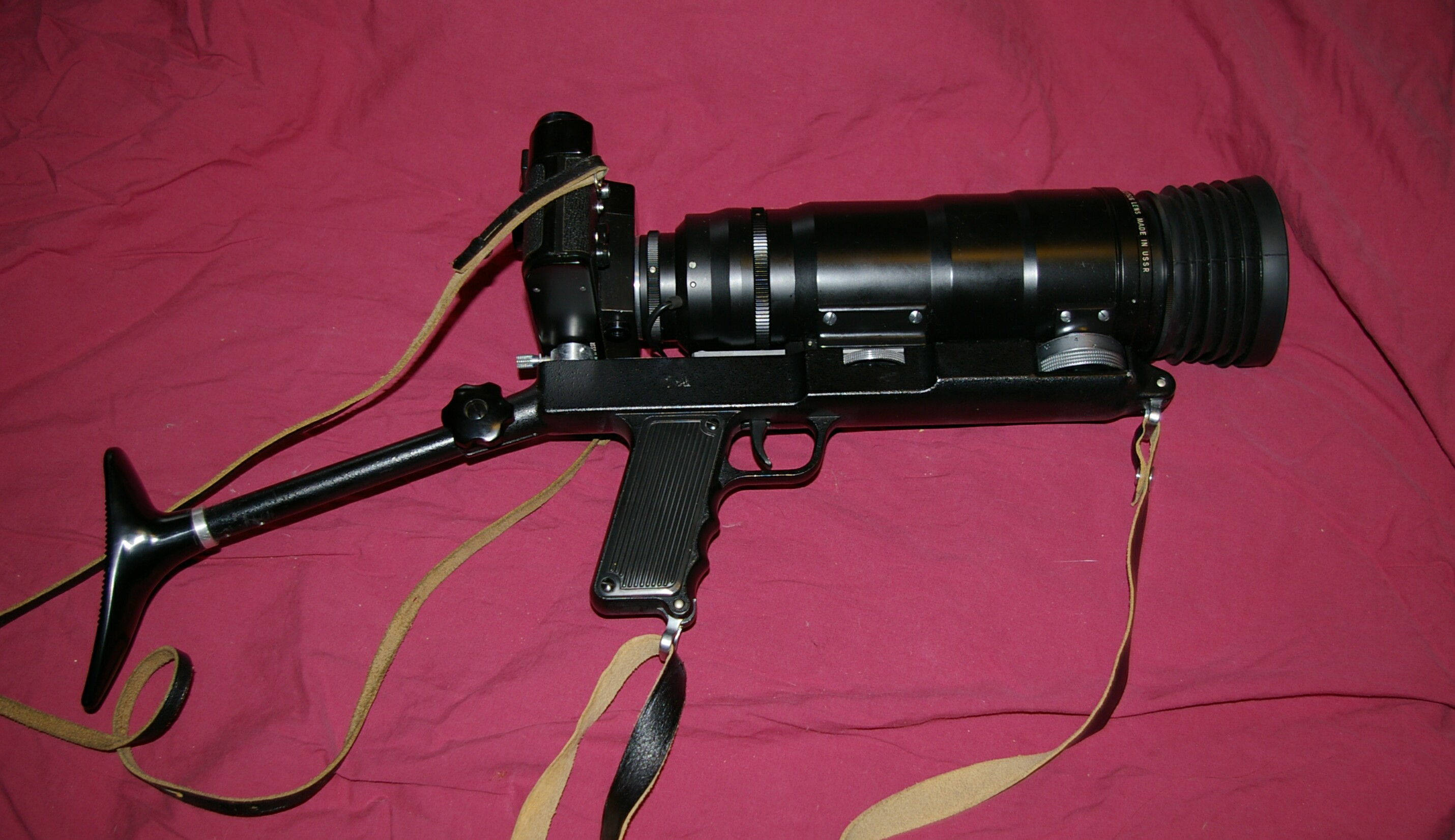
Photosniper 12S

Production Models

- FS-2 (FED RF based)
- FS-3 (Zenit-E based)
- FS-12 (Zenit-12, Zenit-TTL based)
- FS-12-3 (Zenit-12xp based)
- FS-122 (Zenit-122 based)
- FS-412 (Zenit-412DX based)

Low Production and Prototype only

- FS-4
- FS-4M
- FS-5

== Digital models ==
During the 2018 Photokina expo, Zenit announced that it was resuming camera and lens production for the M-mount, as well as for unspecified Nikon and Canon mounts in 2019.

=== Zenit M ===
The digital Zenit M camera was released in a limited edition set with the Zenitar-M 35mm F/1.0 lens. The camera was produced in partnership with Leica, and the digital components derived to some extent from the full-frame Leica M (Typ 240) series. The edition comprised 500 units: fifty units with a black finish and 450 in silver. Russian firmware drives the camera, and the chassis was designed in Krasnogorsk.

=== Zenitar-M ===
Two further M-mount Zenitar lenses are set for release circa March 2019: the Zenitar-M 21mm F/2.8 and the Zenitar-M 50mm F/1.0.

=== Zenit-Leica Collaboration ===
A second digital camera of an entirely new design is planned for release by 2020; also in collaboration with Leica. This camera will make use of a different lens line.

== Enlargers ==
Zenit manufactured a large range of enlargers as well. Some of the best known are the models UPA-5 and UPA-6. UPA-5 is a portable model which folds into a small suitcase. UPA-6 is a more sophisticated enlarger for producing color photo prints.
