= Zenit B =

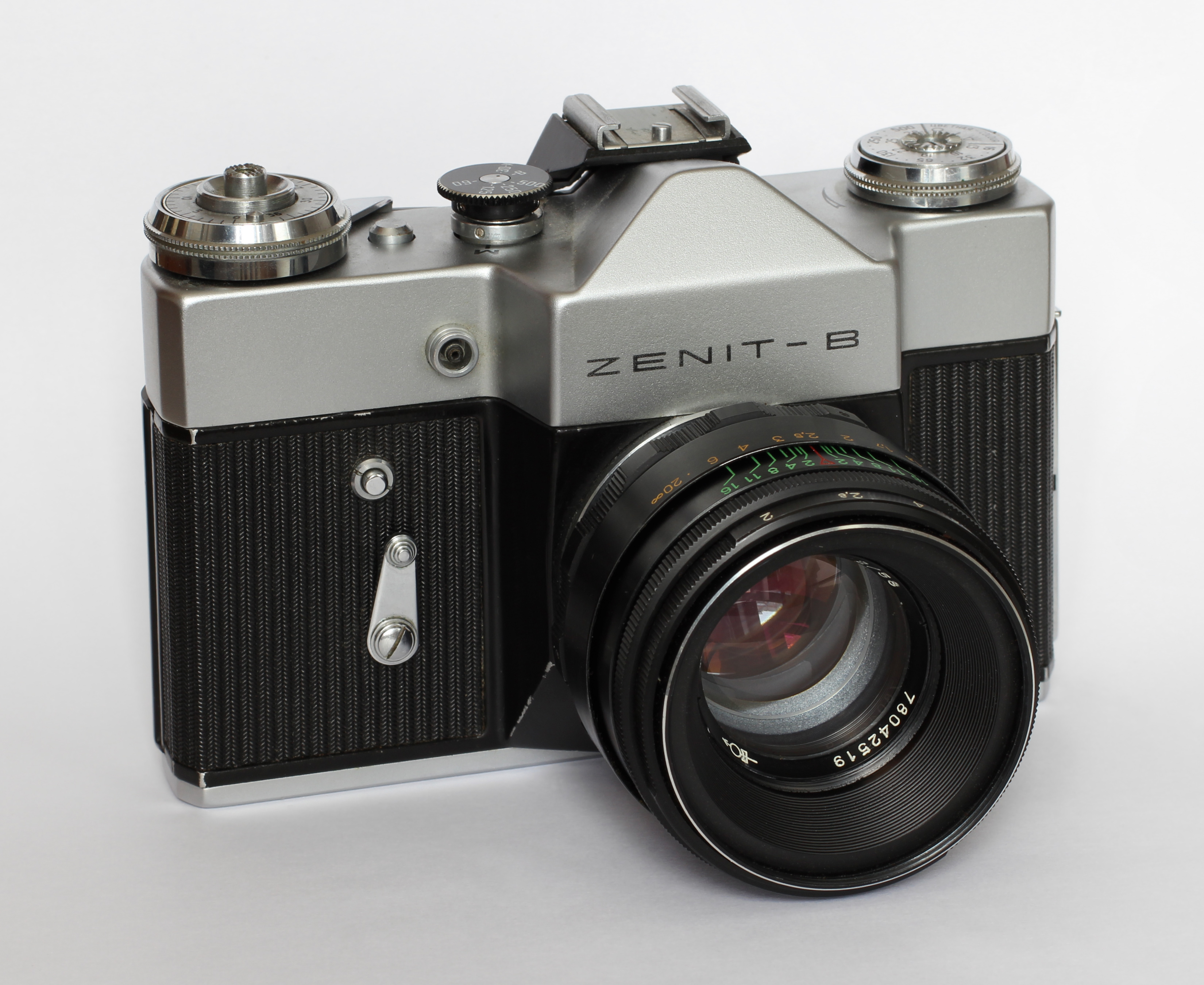
Zenit B with a Helios-44-2 lens attached.

Zenit B (Russian: Зени́т B) is a 35mm single lens reflex camera made by Russian camera manufacturer Zenit in quantities of 889,617 units. It was produced from 1968–1977, either with an M42 mount, or the M39 mount. Shutter speeds were B, 1/30, 1/60, 1/125, 1/250 and 1/500. It is very similar to the Zenit-E, except it does not have a built in light-meter. It also had an instant return mirror, which was common in the era the camera was made. In other countries, the camera was branded as the Kalimar SR100, the Revueflex-B, the Prinzflex-500, and as the Zenit B Global.
