= Tair (lens) =

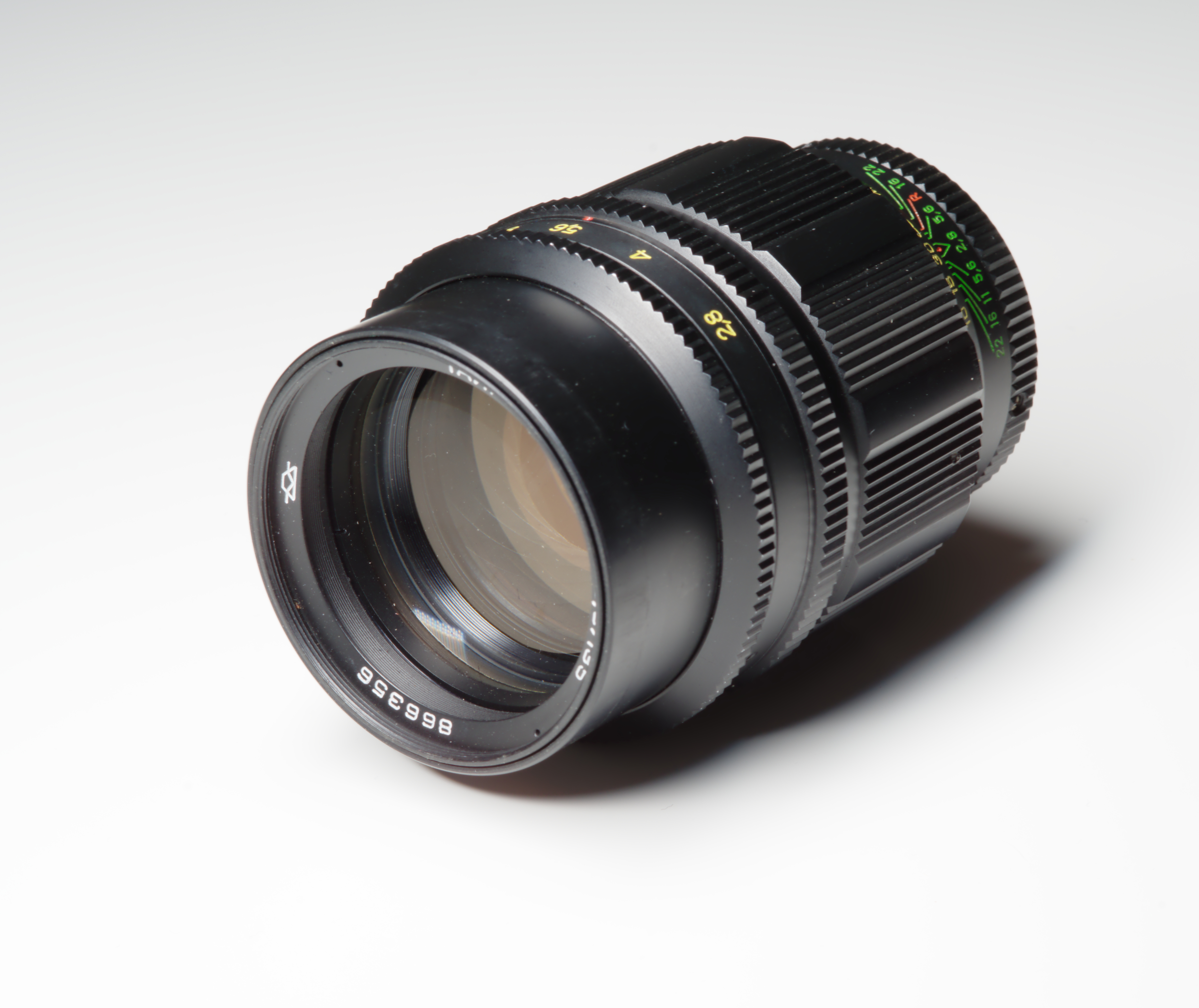
Tair 11A 135mm f/2.8 lens for the M42 lens mount.

Tair is the name of a series of prime lenses manufactured by KMZ in the Soviet Union.

== Tair 11 ==
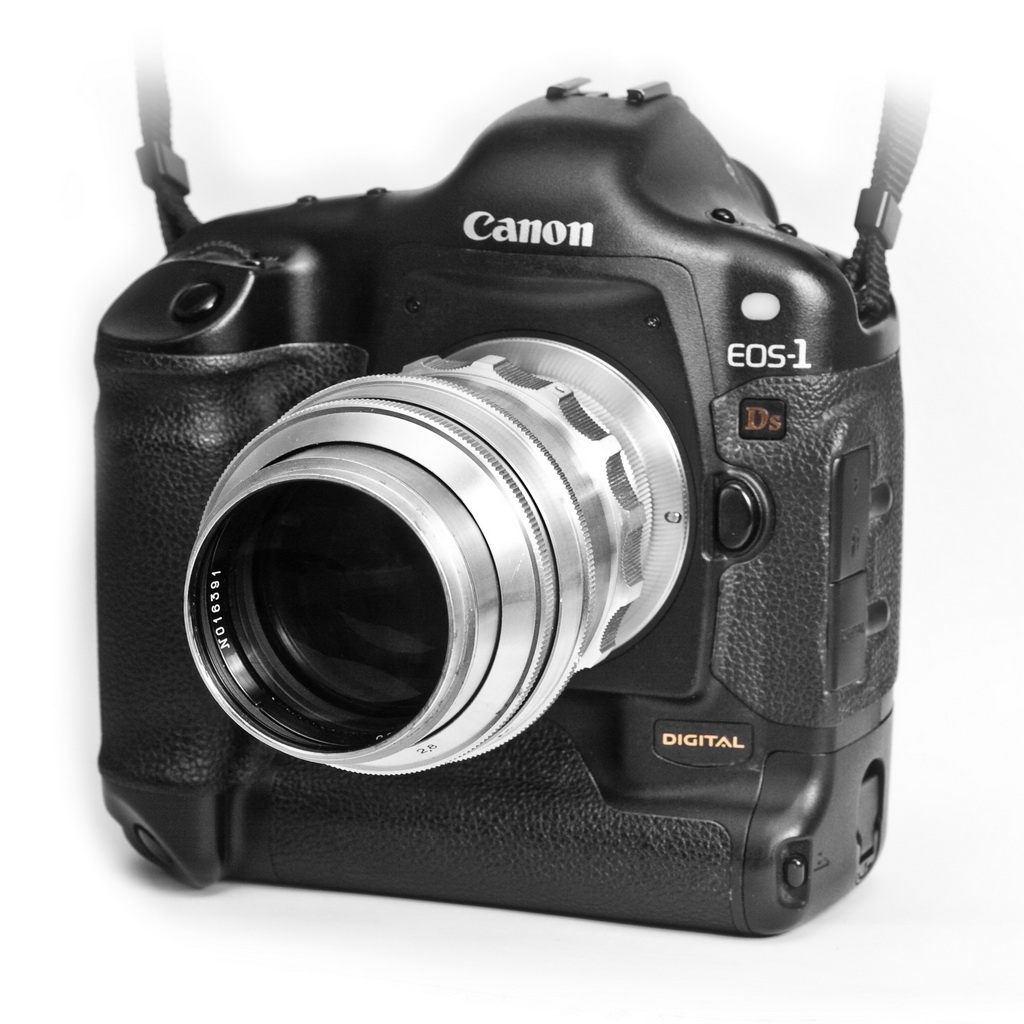
A Tair 11 lens mounted on a Canon EOS 1Ds

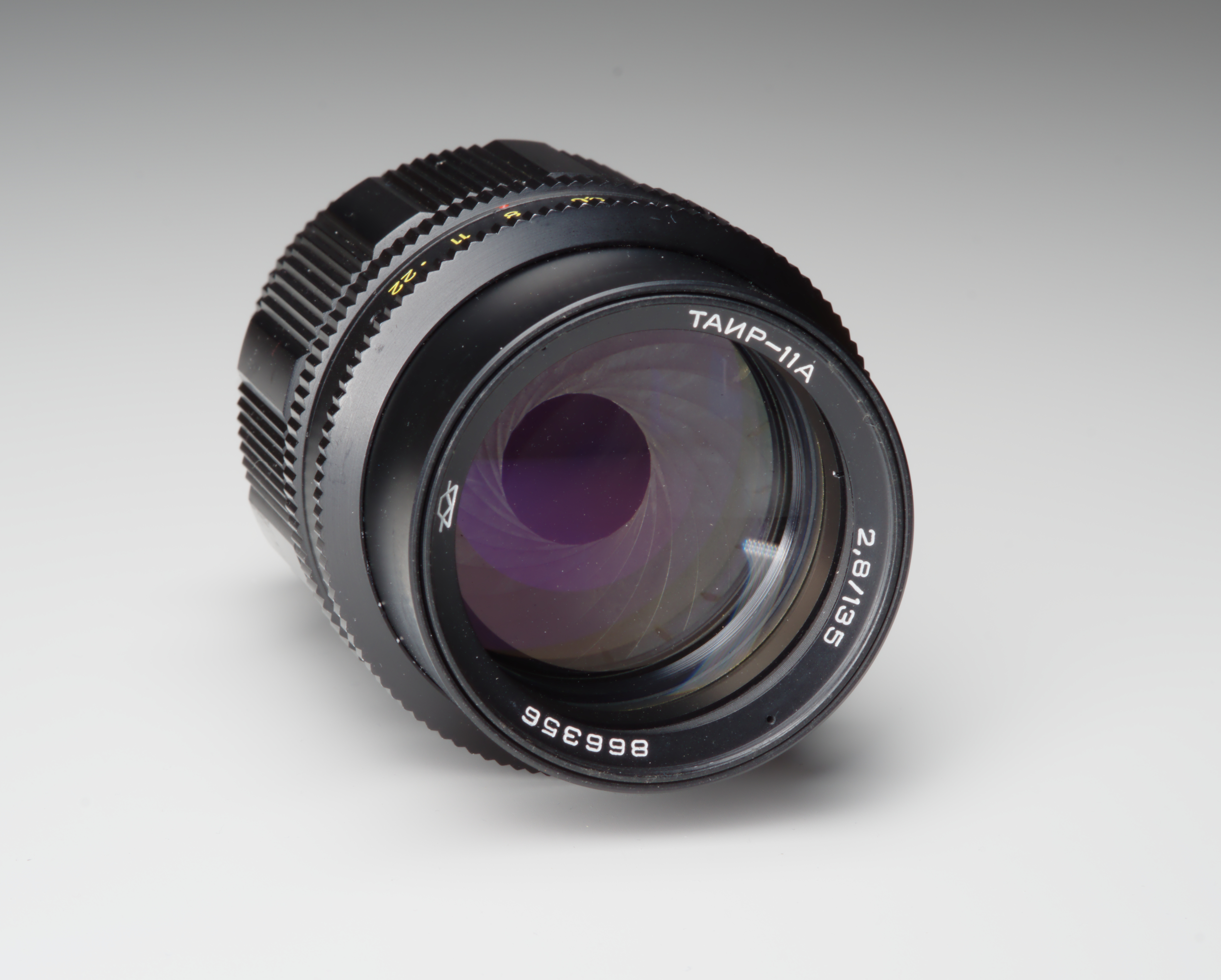
A Tair 11A. The lens is notable for having 20 aperture blades.

The Tair 11 series have a focal length of 133mm with a maximum aperture of f/2.8. Variants include the Tair 11A for the M42 lens mount and the original Tair 11 for the M39 lens mount. The Tair 11-T is a "Technical" or "Television" for cinecamera or surveillance. The Tair 11-2 is an M42 lens with a focal length of 133mm. A unique feature of the Tair 11 series is the twenty aperture blades, far more than many modern lenses.

== Tair 3 ==
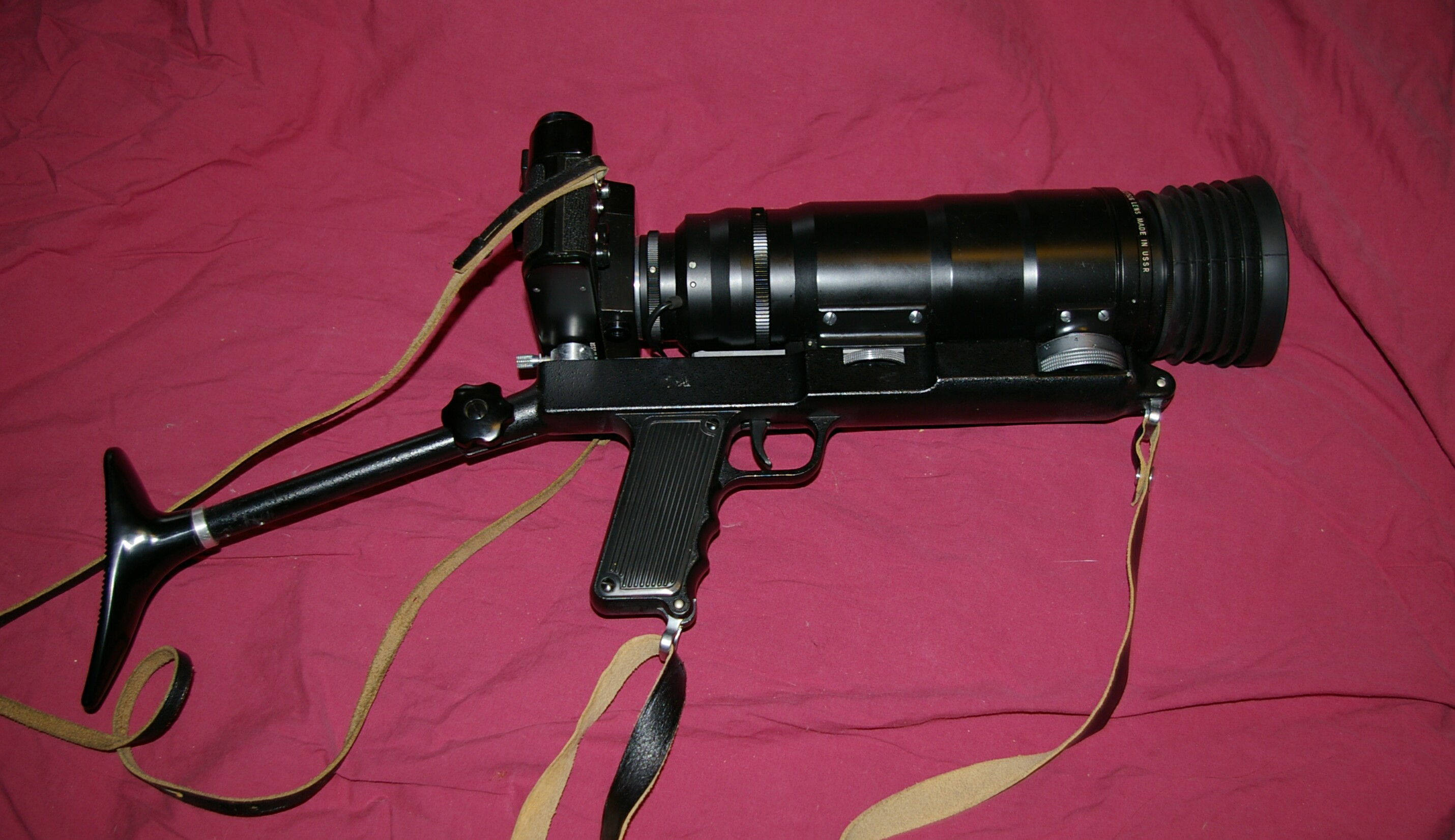
Photosniper 12S with Tair 3 lens mounted

The Tair 3 is a 300mm f/4.5 telephoto lens. Like many other Tair lenses, it uses the M39/M42 lens mount. Although these are mostly black coloured lenses, there exist some very rare light grey ones manufactured earlier. The lens enjoys a reputation of having excellent image quality.

== Tair 33 ==
The Tair 33 is a 300mm f/4.5 telephoto lens for Kiev 88 (V Mount, Tair-33V) and Pentacon Six or Kiev 60 system (P6 Mount, Tair-33B).
