= Smena (camera) =

Soviet series of 35 mm film cameras

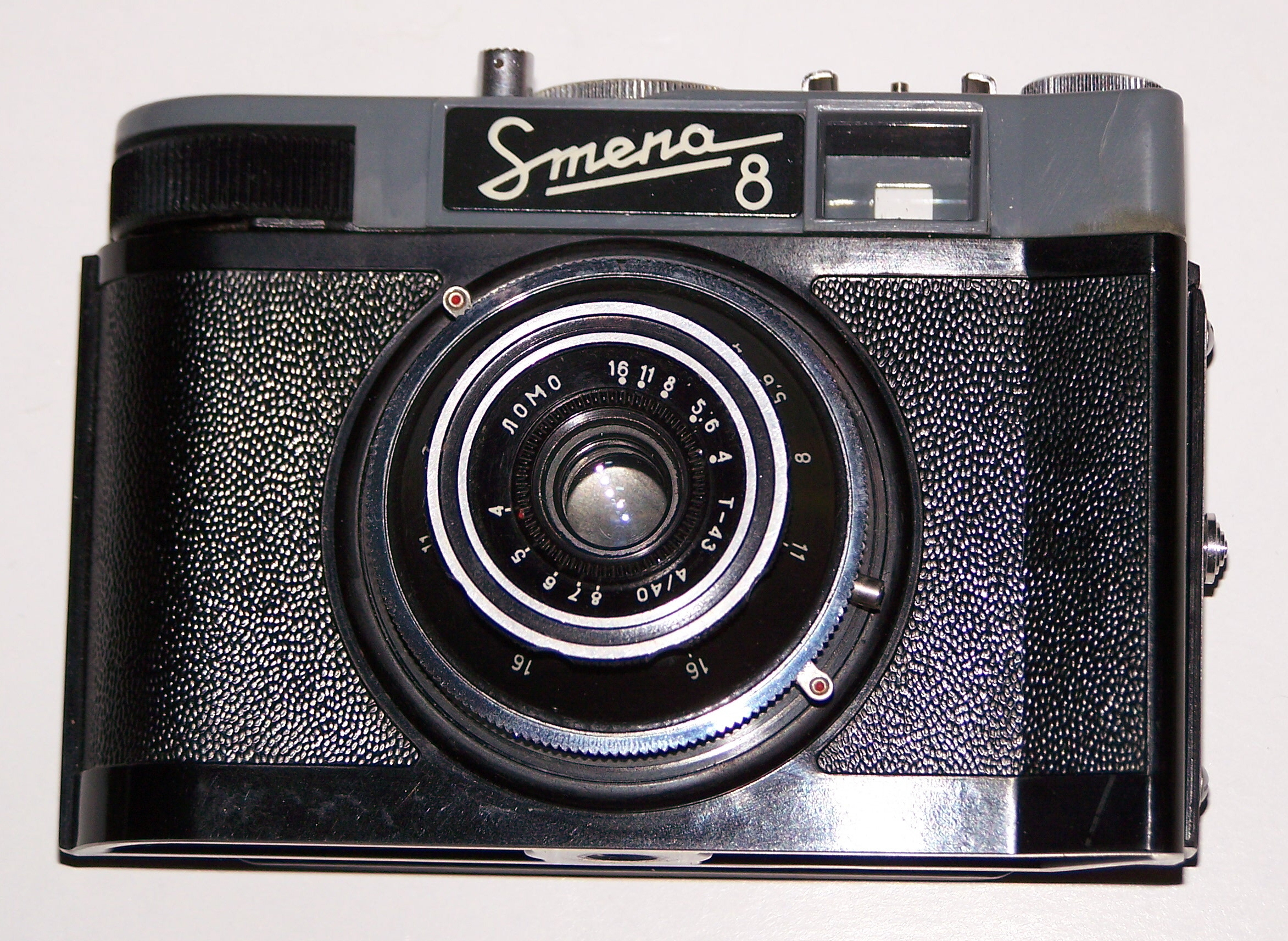
Smena 8

Smena (Russian: Смена, Eng: "Change") is a series of low-cost 35 mm film cameras manufactured in the Soviet Union by the LOMO factory from 1953 to 1991. They were designed to be inexpensive and accessible to the public, made of bakelite or black plastic for the later models.

Their mode of operation was exclusively manual, to the extent that winding of film is separated from shutter cocking.

In the 1960s and 1970s they were exported by Soviet era export conglomerate Mashpriborintorg (Russian: Машприборинторг). Austrian company Lomographische AG now promotes Smenas, as exclusive distributor under agreement with LOMO PLC.

== Specifications ==
=== Smena 8M ===
- Lens: Triplet 43, 40 mm, f/4, 3 elements
- Focal range: 1 m to infinity, scale-focus
- Shutter speeds : B, 1/15, 1/30, 1/60, 1/125, 1/250
- Shutter type: 3 blades diaphragm shutter
- Apertures: f/4, f/5.6, f/8, f/11, f/16
- Film type: 35 mm film
- Size: 70 x 100 x 60 mm
- Weight: 289 g

== Models ==
The Smena models are:

- Smena
- Smena-2
- Smena-2M
- Smena-3
- Smena-4
- Smena-5
- Smena-6
- Smena-7
- Smena-8 or Cosmic 35 for the UK market.
- Smena-8M
- Smena-9
- Smena-35
- Smena-Rapid
- Smena-Symbol
- Smena-M
- Smena-Sl

== Model gallery ==
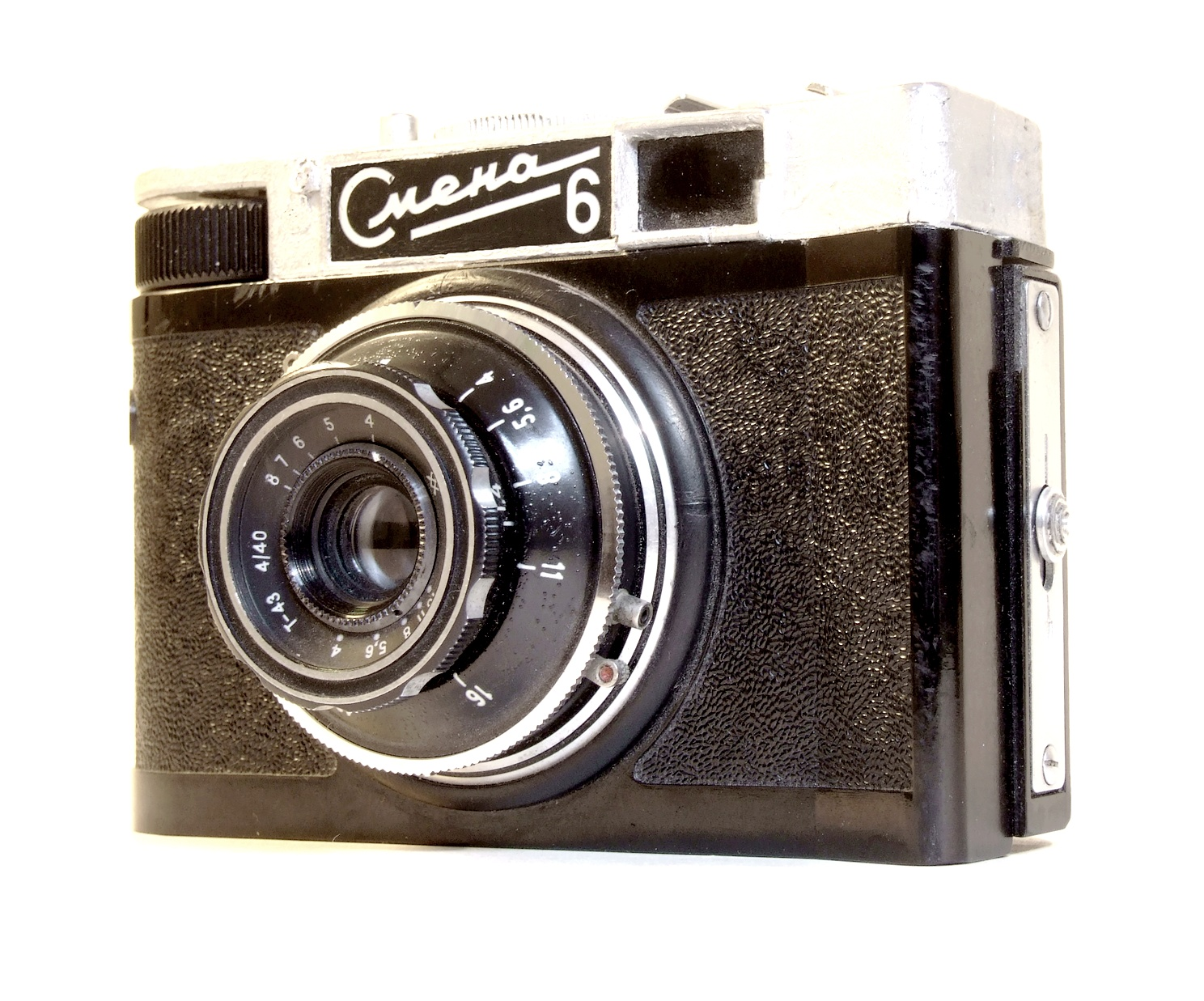
Smena-6

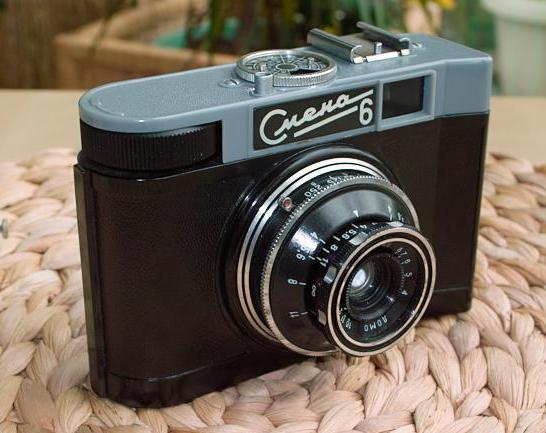
Smena-6

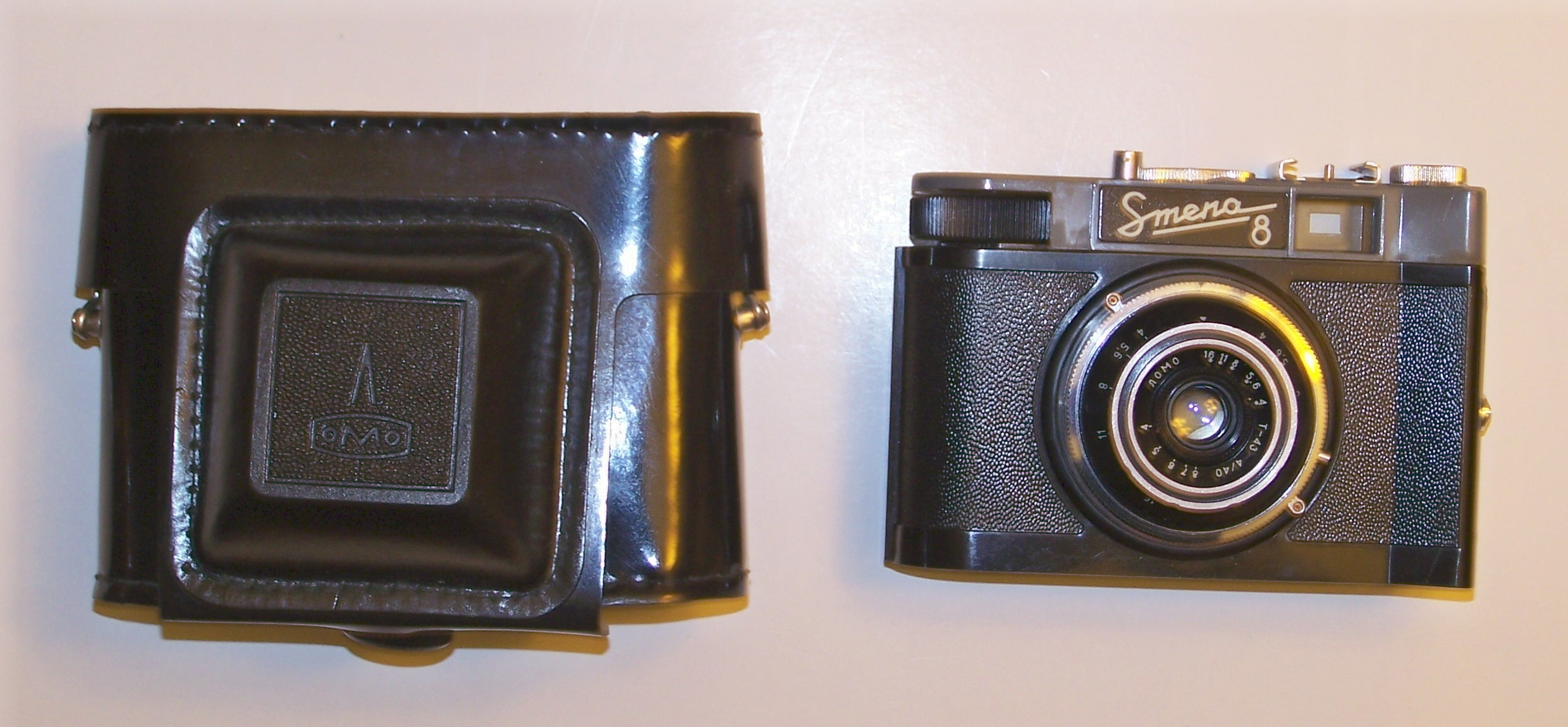
Smena-8 and case

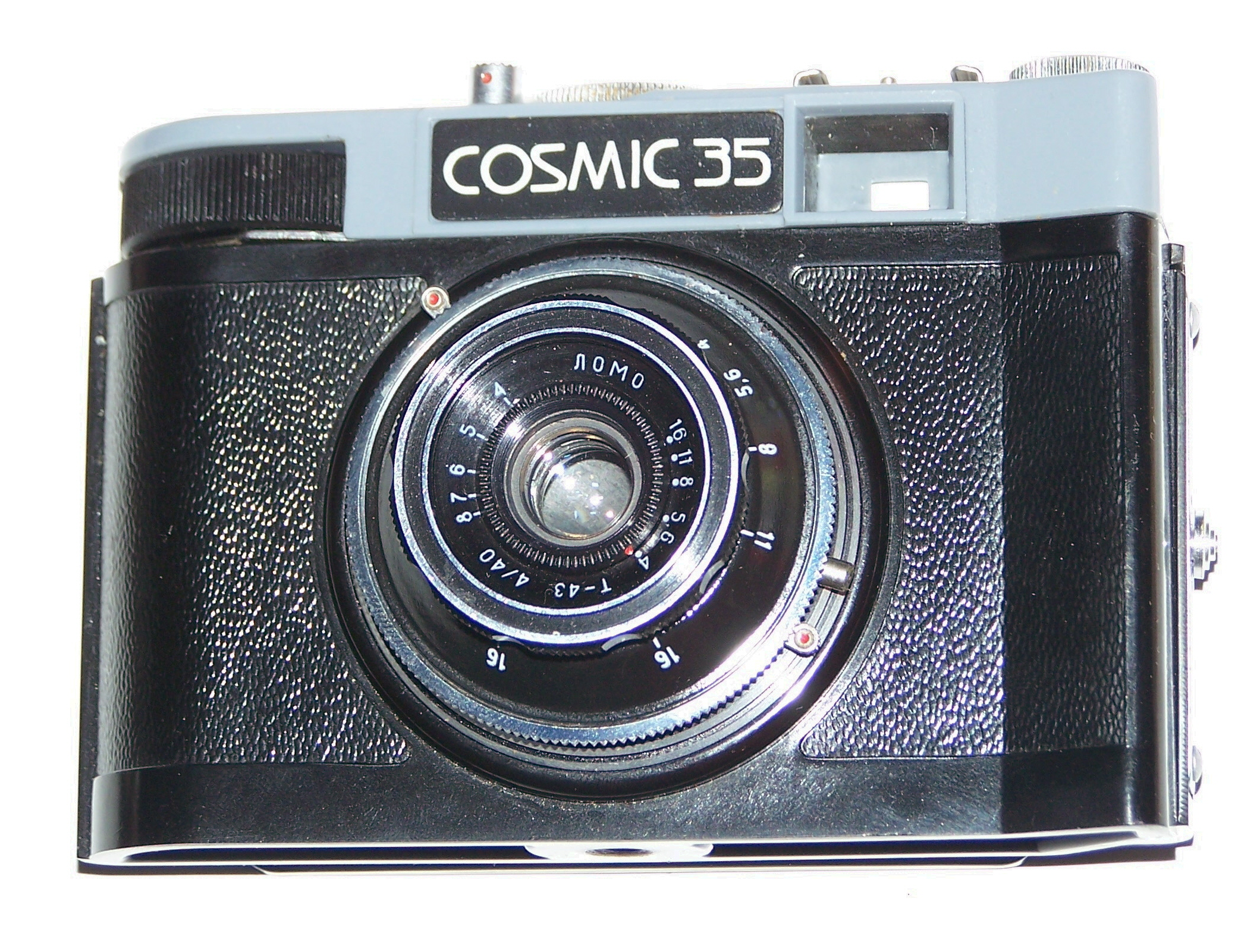
Cosmic-35 (Smena-8 export version)

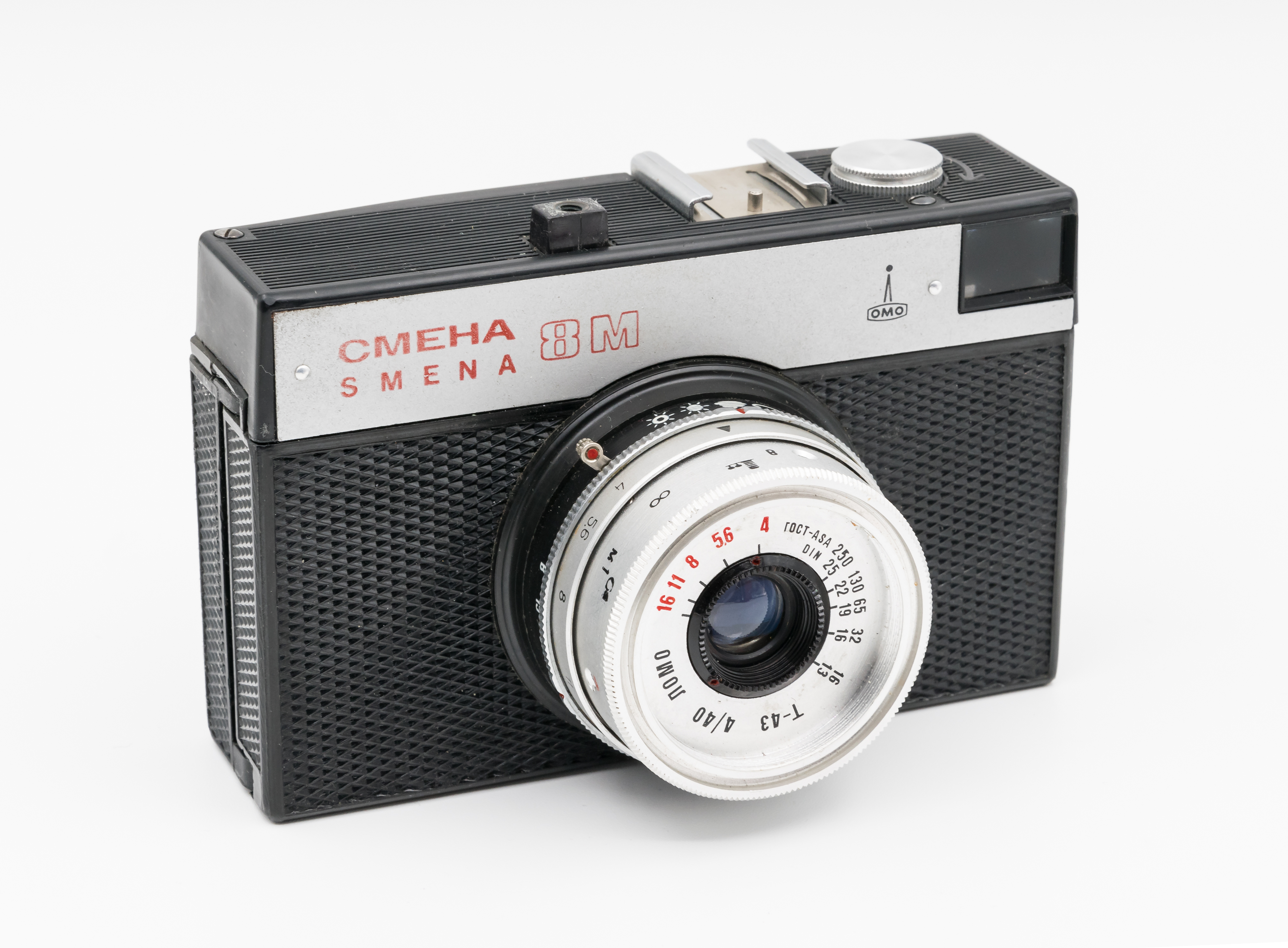
Smena-8M

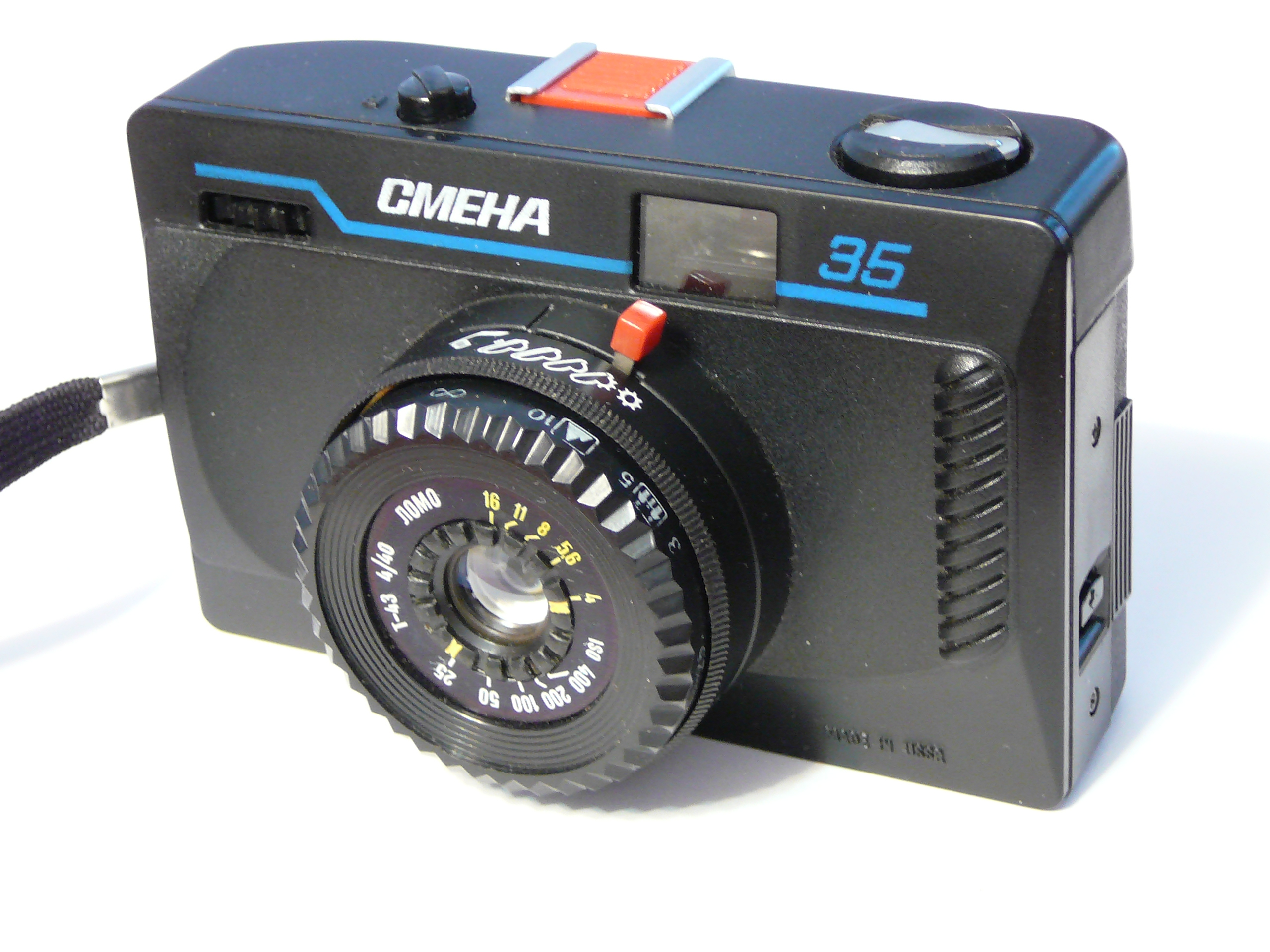
Smena-35

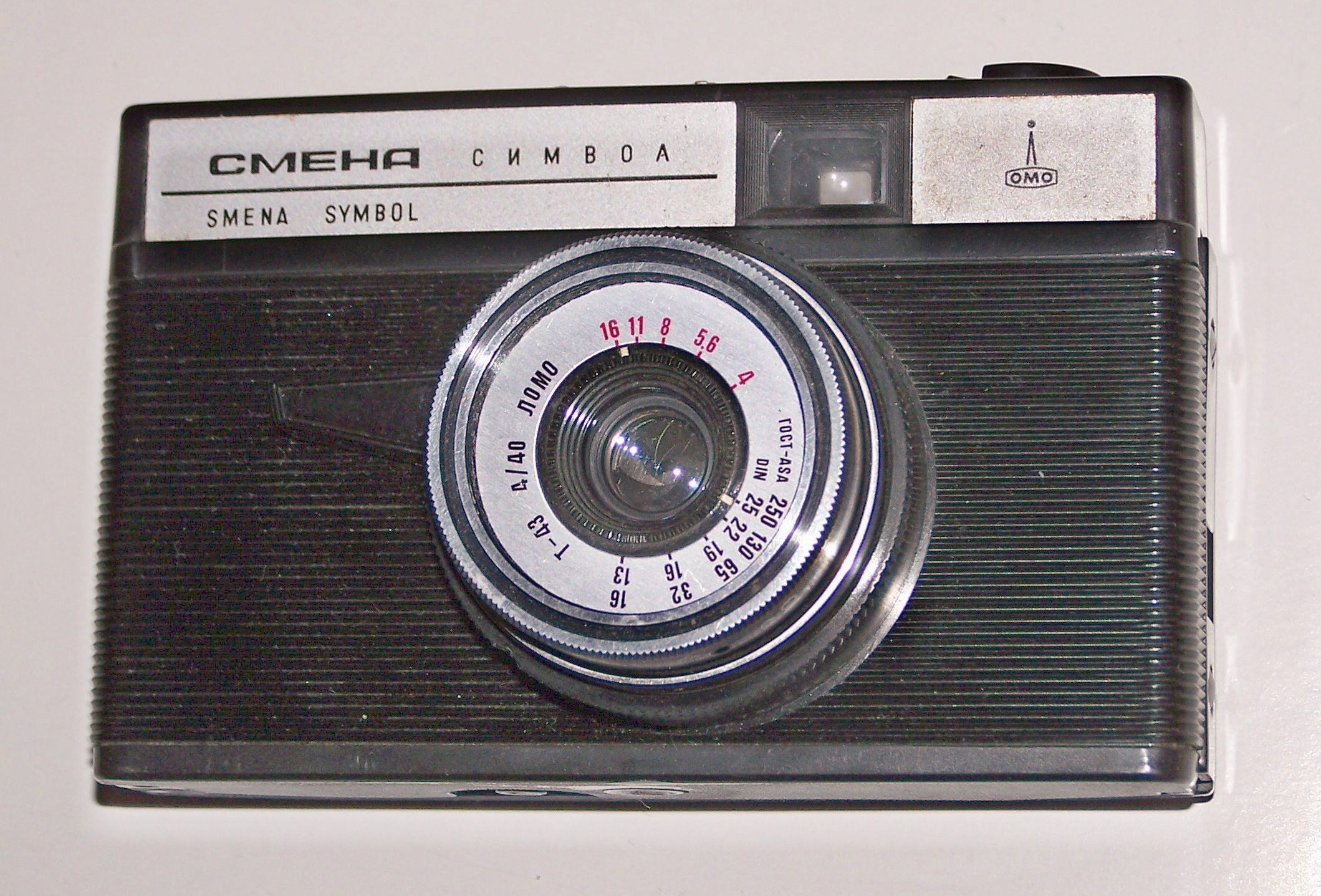
Smena-Symbol

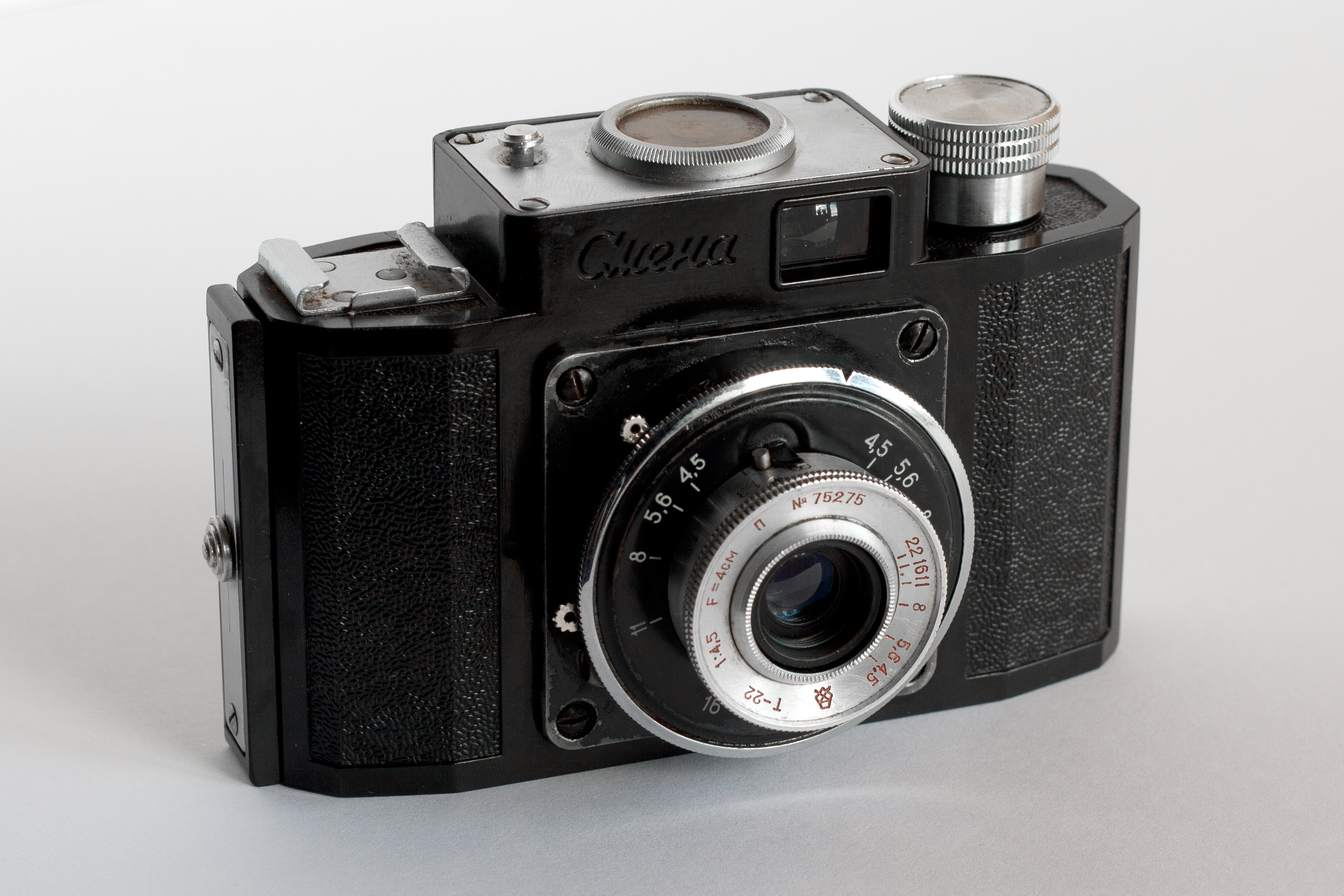
Smena-1

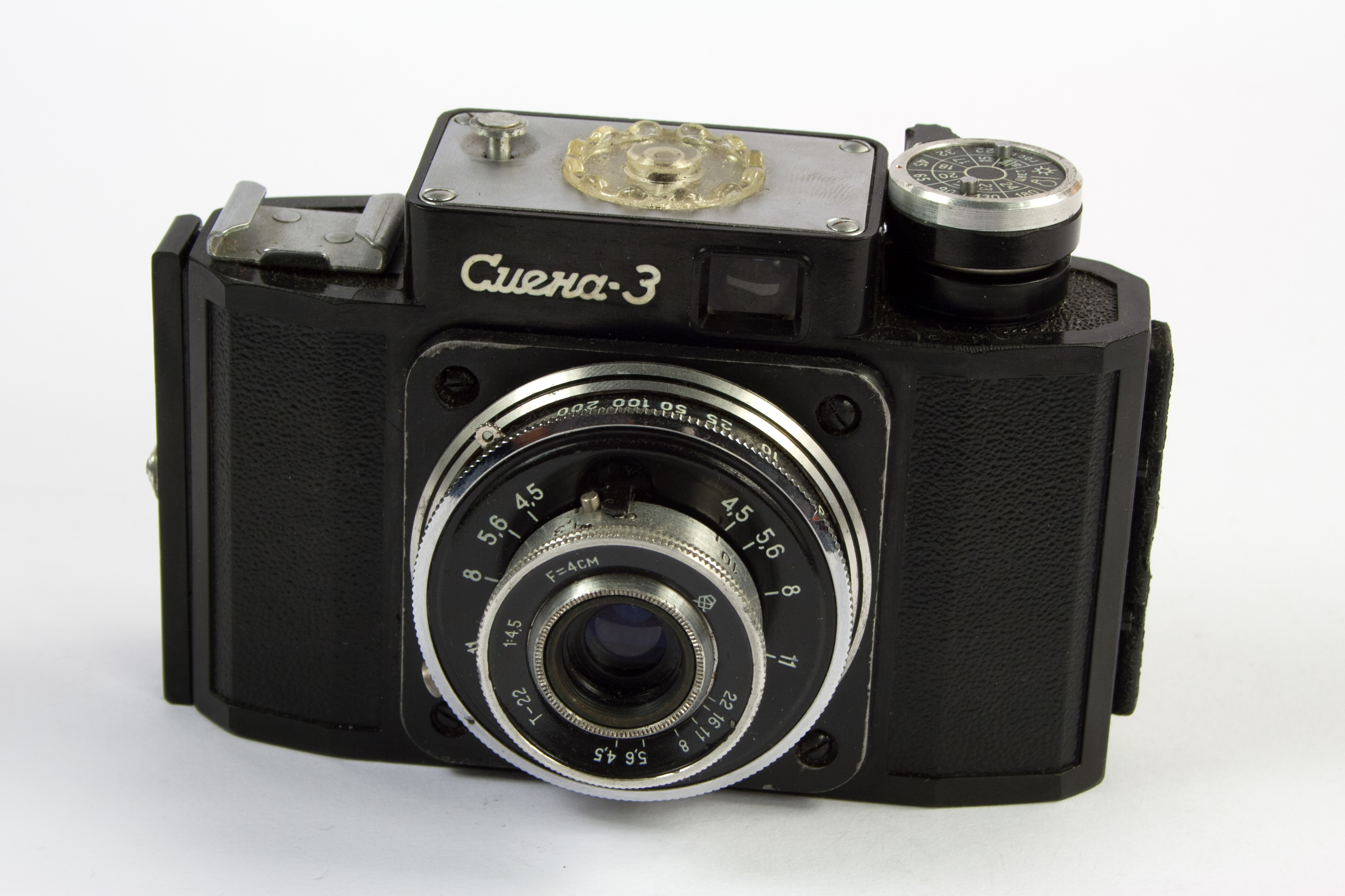
Smena-3

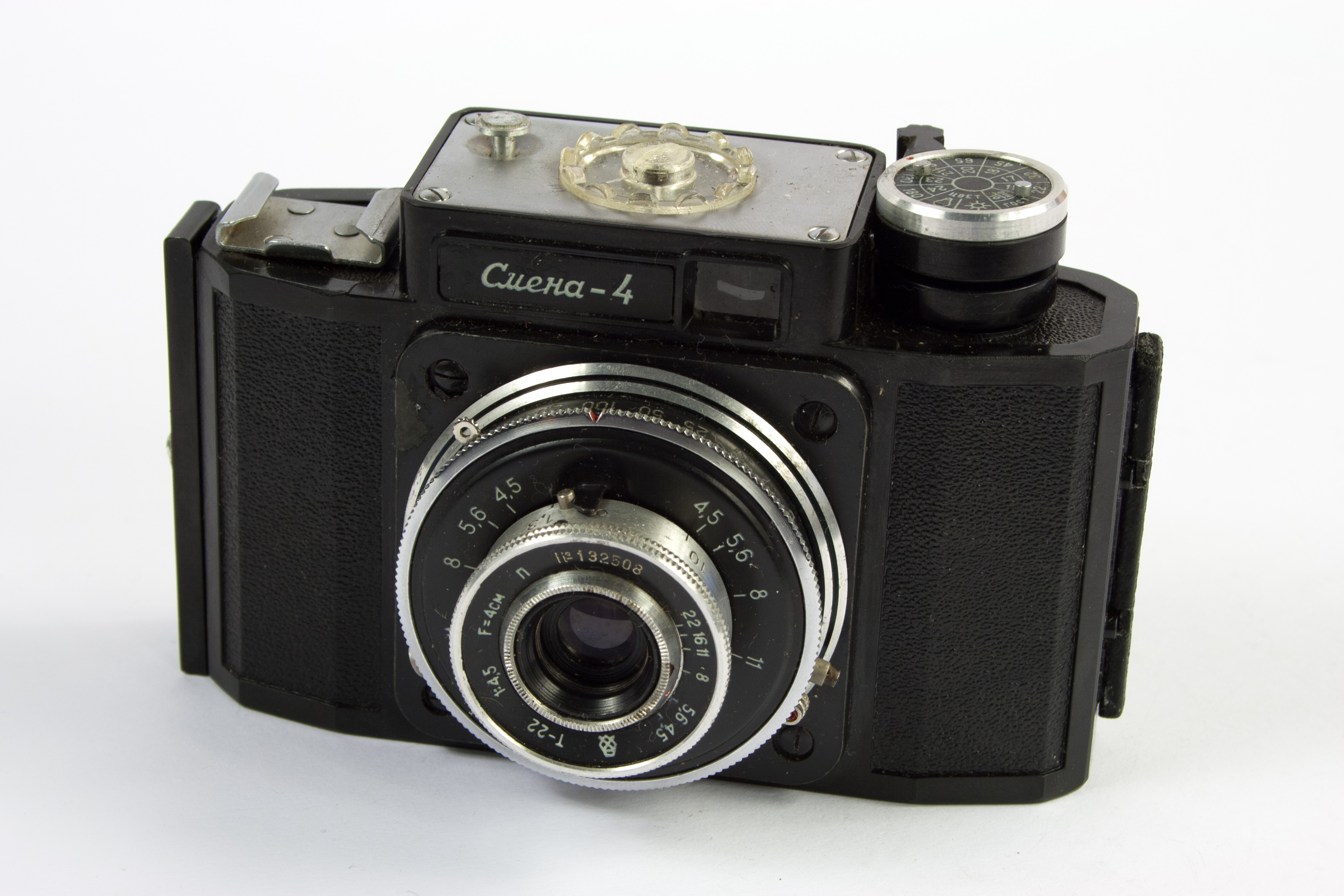
Smena-4

== See also ==
- Lubitel
- Lomography
