= Reactions to the 2023 Israeli judicial reform =

List of reactions to the 2023 Israeli judicial reform

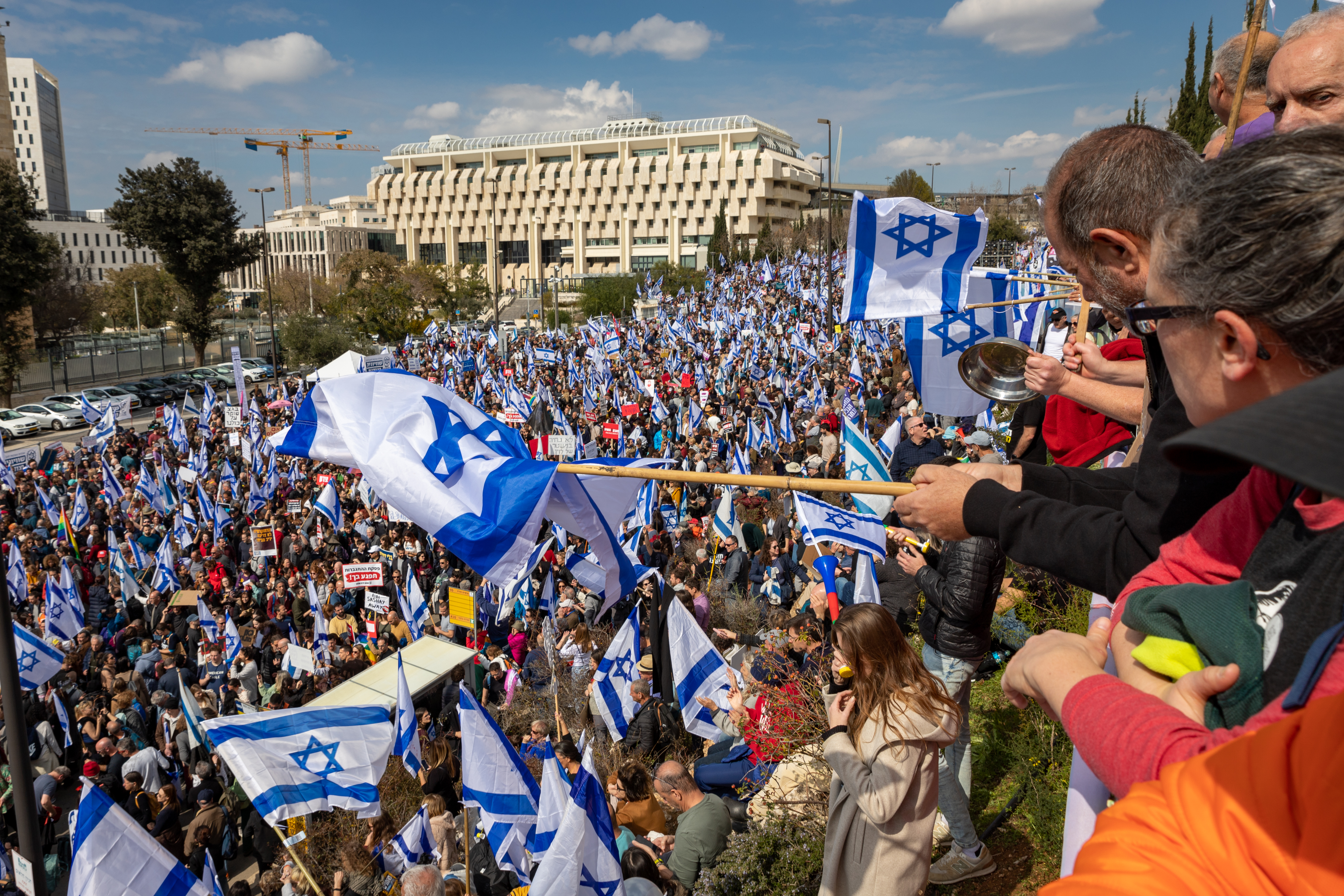
Demonstrators against the judicial reform in Jerusalem, 13 February 2023

On 4 January 2023 the newly appointed Israeli justice minister Yariv Levin announced his intention to make a number of major changes to the judicial system and the balance of powers in Israel. On 11 January, Levin published a draft of his proposed changes, which included significant changes to the judiciary, executive and legislative processes and functions. The government's proposed reform has sparked intense controversy in Israel. Opposition leaders, senior past civil servants, economists, activists, jurists, and others have harshly criticized the proposed changes, arguing they will undermine judicial independence and effectively grant the government unchecked power. The opponents to the reform include reservists in Israel's security forces, with some stating they will stop conducting reserve duty service if the proposed reform is progressed through as legislation. They also include members of Israel's financial and tech sectors. Large-scale street protests against the reform began shortly after its introduction and took place until 7 October, when the Gaza war began.

The reform has received support from some academics, with 120 professors and retired politicians expressing their support. It has received support from religious Zionist rabbis, as well as members of the political right, who have staged counter-protests in response to opposition demonstrations. The reform has also triggered international reactions, with U.S. president Joe Biden and German foreign minister Annalena Baerbock expressing concern over the reform and its adoption process.

== Opinion polls ==
According to a poll published by the Israel Democracy Institute on 4 January 2023 "only 16 percent of Israelis ... said that they believed that the number of politicians on the Judicial Selection Committee should be increased, while 19 percent said that the current composition of the body was appropriate and a full quarter supported increasing the number of justices. A further 10 percent supported increasing the number of Bar Association representatives."

A survey published by the Israel Democracy Institute on 15 January 2023 "found that most Israelis, (55.6%), support the Supreme Court having the ability to strike down laws passed by the Knesset parliament if they contradict principles of democracy".

The Israel Democracy Institute's Israeli Voice Index published on 3 February 2023 showed that "The share of those who think that the reform to the justice system proposed by Minister of Justice Levin is quite bad or very bad (43%) is larger than that of those who think it is quite good or very good (31%)."

A poll commissioned by the Jewish People Policy Institute and published on 7 February 2023 revealed that "While 84% of Israelis believe the judicial system is in need of any change, only 22% support every change proposed in the reform." The same poll found 60% of respondents across all backgrounds and from across the political spectrum believed the judicial reforms "would lead to violence" between the two conflicting camps.

A Channel 12 poll published on 10 February 2023 "indicated that over 60 percent of the public wants the government to halt or delay its legislative efforts to dramatically weaken the High Court of Justice and secure political control over judicial appointments".

A poll carried out by IDI's Viterbi Family Center for Public Opinion and Policy Research and published on 21 February 2023 found that only a quarter of respondent supported the proposed changes, and slightly over half of respondents felt the judicial reforms would harm Israel's economy. Further details of responses include:

- 63% think the Supreme Court should have the power to strike down a law if it is incompatible with the Basic Laws.
- 60% think that the current balance in the makeup of the Judicial Selection Committee should be maintained.
- 58% oppose modifying the current method by which Ministry Legal Advisors are appointed.
- 67% agreed there should be compromise negotiations between the conflicting parties to create consensus.

A poll taken on 15–16 March 2023 by Maariv, asking for views on the compromise proposal presented by President Herzog on 15 March, found that 42% of respondents supported the proposal, 34% opposed it, and 24% did not express an opinion.

Two opinion polls carried out on 27 March 2023, a poll for Channel 12 by Manu Geva and a poll for public broadcaster Kan by Kantar, yielded similar results. Channel 12's survey showed that 63% of respondents support a pause in the judicial reform legislation, compared to 24% who oppose a pause. Kan's poll showed 62% of the public supporting a pause, and 22% opposing it. Having secured 64 of the 120 Knesset seats in the November 2022 election, the governing coalition would now get 54 seats according to the Channel 12 poll and 53 seats according to the Kan poll. The Channel 12 poll also found that 63% of respondents opposed Netanyahu's decision to fire Defense Minister Yoav Gallant over his call for a pause in the legislation.

The controversy surrounding the reform has resulted in support for the incumbent government taking a large hit in opinion polls, with every poll conducted since late March 2023 predicting the governing coalition would lose its majority if a new election was held.

== Intervention by the President of Israel ==
On 12 February 2023, the president of Israel, Isaac Herzog, gave a special address to the nation, stating that "the totality of the parts of the reform in its current form raise deep concerns about their potential negative impact on the democratic foundations of the State of Israel". He said that the courts "safeguard society and the state" against crime and international prosecution of IDF soldiers, but also against the loss of "the fundamentals of justice, law and morality". The President called for the legislative process regarding the judicial reforms to be halted, to arrive at a compromise based on a five-point plan presented during his speech.

While the U.S. ambassador to Israel, Tom Nides, reacted positively to Herzog's speech, others referred to it as a "surrendering proposal". Nides tweeted straight after Herzog's speech, "Great speech tonight by a great leader". Some politicians from the ruling coalition delegitimized Herzog's and Nides "intervention" in political debate. On the other hand, prominent protesters and publicists referred to Herzog's speech as a "surrendering proposal", and claimed that democracy and human liberty are "not a matter of compromise". These critics emphasized that Herzog's proposal essentially keeps parliament's power to override the court's decisions, and that the current state of affairs is much more balanced.

In a televised address on 9 March 2023, President Herzog described the current crisis as "a national nightmare" and called on Prime Minister Netanyahu to immediately to halt the legislative process. He said that "The legislation, as it is now ... is misguided, brutal and undermines our democratic foundations". Herzog added that "Israel's democracy is the highest value. An independent judiciary is the highest value. Protecting human rights – of men and women, and minorities and maintaining the unique and rich Israeli mosaic – is the highest value."

On 15 March, President Herzog presented a compromise proposal as an alternative to the government's planned changes to the judicial system. The proposal suggests that:

- The 'reasonableness' standard – which allows the High Court to override government decisions it deems 'unreasonable' – would not be applicable to government decisions and ministerial appointments.
- The Supreme Court would not intervene in Basic Laws. Its intervention in regular laws would require a quorum of 11 judges and a two-thirds majority.
- The Judicial Appointments Committee would be composed of 11 members including three Supreme Court justices, three cabinet ministers, three Knesset members (a coalition member and two opposition members) and two representatives of the public. Agreement of seven members would be needed for the appointment of Supreme Court justices.

== Partial backtracking by individuals and organizations promoting the changes ==
=== Partial backtracking by the Kohelet Policy Forum ===
Many of the arguments supporting the proposed changes to the legal system are based on papers published by the Kohelet Policy Forum (see citations in 2023 Israeli judicial reform § The proposed changes). Nevertheless, some prominent members of that forum have criticised important aspects of the legislation.

While defending most of the changes the government is seeking to make to the judicial system, Moshe Koppel, the head of the Kohelet Policy Forum, whose work forms the basis of many of those changes, drew the line at the override clause, stating: "that should scare you. Most laws are not crazy, but every now and then there is a crazy law, and the same 61 people who voted for the crazy law ... can then override the Supreme Court decision, and therefore, this is worrisome. This override is a dumb idea."

Moshe Koppel said subsequently that his organization had advised Justice Minister Levin that "the override is completely idiotic". He blamed the override clause on the Haredi parties, saying that "They want it because they have certain specific issues that they are concerned that the Supreme Court will strike down. The draft exemption is one. Also, gender separation."

Kohelet has removed position papers from its website, including proposals promoting the override clause, without announcing such deletions publicly.

Michael Sarel, head of economics at Kohelet Policy Forum, has written that while he agrees that there are problems with the judicial system which need fixing, he does not support the government's current proposals. His open letter states that "The separation of powers is one of the most important, most influential and most successful ideas in human history. The proposed reform will create a situation in which there will be no separation of powers, in that it subordinates the legal system to the will of the coalition. This proposal could be reasonable, and even very desirable, but only when at the same time there exists a powerful and independent court. Under the proposed reform, however, that will not be the situation." Sarel wrote that the planned reform gives almost unlimited power to a governing coalition, and that this is likely to lead to interference with the electoral process, for example by disqualifying parties and candidates and suppressing the media. "When there is no separation of powers and the coalition has almost unlimited power, it is reasonable to suppose that it will want to use that power to raise its chances of political survival." He argued that "the temptation to take measures that will increase the chances of the parties making up the coalition to succeed in the next elections will be very strong and will be difficult to resist." Sarel added that "A democratic system in which ... there is no proper separation of powers will find it hard to survive for long as a democracy. It is no coincidence that the saying 'all power tends to corrupt; absolute power corrupts absolutely' has become a truism of political science."

In an interview with Haaretz, Professor Gideon Sapir of the Kohelet Policy Forum said: "I think that changes need to be made in regard to the judicial system in Israel. But those changes need to be moderate ones. They need to be made attentively and by agreement." Sapir explained that he is one of the founders of the Kohelet Policy Forum, where he is the head of the Ph.D. program, but that he is not involved in the reform initiative.

=== Partial backtracking by Justice Minister Yariv Levin ===
On 3 April 2023, after the governing coalition had made some changes to the proposed law governing the makeup of the Judicial Appointments Committee, Justice Minister Yariv Levin, who has been driving the legislative changes through the Knesset, gave an interview about this law to Channel 14. Speaking about critics of the law, he said: "They contend that in a system where an unlimited number of judges can be appointed by a coalition majority, we will find ourselves in a situation where that coalition [...] will be able to take over the Supreme Court while in power and [...] create a situation where all three branches [of government] are turned into one. That argument is [...] that it could eventually lead to a constitutional crisis, a claim that cannot be ignored – that such a thing could never exist in a democratic country."

== Domestic reactions ==
The government's proposed reform of the judicial system has sparked intense controversy in Israel. Opposition leaders, activists, and prominent figures in the judiciary have harshly criticized the proposed changes, arguing they will undermine judicial independence and effectively grant the government unchecked power. They also accused Prime Minister Benjamin Netanyahu of seeking to weaken the judiciary due to his ongoing corruption trial. The following sub-sections include a selection of notable reactions.

=== Reactions opposing the changes ===
==== Public ====
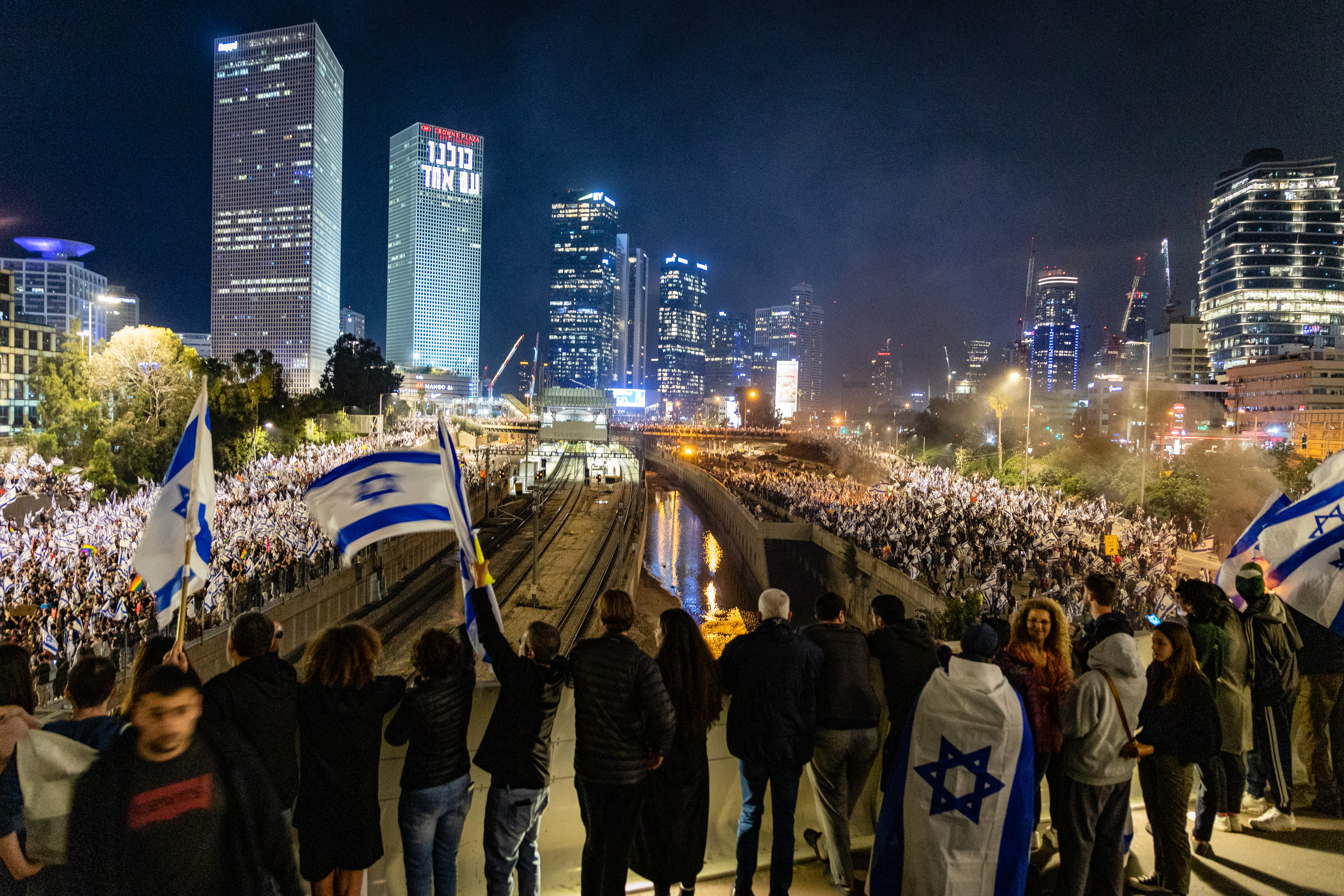
Protesters block Ayalon Highway in Tel Aviv, 26 March 2023

The proposed reforms have led to large-scale street protests across Israel. According to organizers, on 11 February 2023, approximately 145,000 people protested in Tel Aviv, with another 83,000 in other areas across the country, including in Jerusalem, Haifa, and the West Bank. On 13 February 2023, approximately 80,000 people protested in Jerusalem against the judicial reforms. Israel's centrist, centre-left, and left-wing opposition parties have organized the protests with grassroots activists. The protests were cited as examples of the political polarization that has been growing in Israel, and has increased during Netanyahu's sixth term as the Israeli prime minister.

==== Politicians ====
Opposition Leader Yair Lapid has described the reform as a "unilateral revolution against the system of government in Israel" and urged his supporters to take to the streets to protest against it.

National Unity leader Benny Gantz said the reform would render Israel "democratically disabled" and urged his supporters to "go out en masse and to demonstrate" and to "make the country tremble".

Former justice minister Gideon Sa'ar wrote about "the damage that could be done to the rights and freedoms of citizens of Israel if the plan to demolish the judiciary goes ahead as planned". He concluded with "All those who love freedom, regardless of political leanings, must join together in the fight for Israel's future."

Vice Chairman of the World Zionist Organization Yizhar Hess has expressed strong opposition to the proposed reforms, describing them as "a shocking plan to fundamentally alter Israel's system of government".

Former Knesset member Yael German, who quit as Israel's ambassador to France following the swearing in of the current government, said: "I'll do whatever I can ... to stop this disaster. I believe the future of democracy in our country is at stake."

Ronen Hoffman, Israel's ambassador to Canada, resigned his post due to incompatibility with policies of the coalition government.

Asaf Zamir, Israel's consul general in New York, criticized the plans to dramatically change Israel's judicial system. He said, "I'm deeply concerned about the direction the country is going in right now. If you want to have the national home and to be everyone's home, it really must be democratic."

Former prime minister Naftali Bennett criticized the plan, describing it as dangerous and calling for negotiations between the coalition and opposition for an alternate plan.

==== Members of the legal profession ====
===== Supreme Court justices =====
Chief Justice of the Supreme Court of Israel Ester Hayut said the reform would cause a "mortal wound" to judicial independence and would "deprive the court of the option to override laws that disproportionately violate human rights, including the right to life, property, freedom of movement, as well as the basic right of human dignity and its derivatives – the right to equality, freedom of speech and more".

A group of 18 former Supreme Court justices issued a statement warning against the coalition's plans, stating that the reforms "not only present a grave threat to the judicial system, but also the nature of the [political] system and way of life in Israel, in particular the possibility to fairly and efficiently protect the basic rights of every person. We see it as our duty to warn of this danger before it is realized." Separately, former chief justice of the Supreme Court Dorit Beinisch stated that the proposed changes would "destroy the court's independence". Also separately, former Supreme Court Justice Ayala Procaccia described the proposed judicial reforms as "a danger both internally and to Israel's image in the world".

In separate television interviews with Channels 12 and 13 and the public broadcaster Kan, former Supreme Court president Aharon Barak said that "the rights of everybody – Jew, Arab, ultra-Orthodox, not ultra-Orthodox – are in grave danger." He described the proposed judicial changes as "the constitutional equivalent of a coup with tanks."

===== Attorneys general =====
Attorney General of Israel Gali Baharav-Miara warned that the reform would "push democratic values to a corner" and that the proposed legislation would lead "to a governmental structure in which the executive and legislative branches have broad and, effectively, unlimited authority, with no structural solution to the possibility of abuse of power". She has issued an official opinion, stating that each of the provisions of the proposed judicial reforms would damage Israel's system of checks and balances on its own and more so cumulatively.

All seven living former Attorneys General (Aharon Barak, Yitzhak Zamir, Michael Ben-Yair, Elyakim Rubinstein, Menachem Mazuz, Yehuda Weinstein and Avichai Mandelblit) and four of the five former State Prosecutors (Dorit Beinisch, Edna Arbel, Eran Shendar and Moshe Lador) have published a letter saying "We were shocked to hear the plan ... and we're convinced that it does not herald an improvement of the system, but threatens to destroy it." The letter continues to say that the plan "significantly limits the authority of the court to exercise effective criticism of the government so that it does not misuse its power and allows a coalition majority to legalize any act of the government, no matter how wrong and harmful it may be, through an override clause". The authors of the letter wrote that "the Supreme Court is a magnificent institution, one of the best that has arisen in Israel, and it is also recognized outside of Israel as one of the best courts in the world. In the absence of a constitution, and without a charter of human rights, it is the one that ruled in Israel the rule of law even towards system of government, fight arbitrariness and governmental corruption, and protect human rights and minority groups."

The previous attorney general, Avichai Mandelblit, who was appointed as Cabinet Secretary and then Attorney General by Netanyahu, has described the government's proposed sweeping and drastic overhaul of the legal and judicial system as "regime change" that would "eliminate the independence of Israel's legal system from end to end". Mandelblit also accused Prime Minister Netanyahu of advancing the overhaul to bring his ongoing criminal trial to a premature end. In response, Knesset Member Simcha Rothman, who is spearheading some of the reforms, called for the jailing of Avichai Mandelblit for "incitement".

===== Academics =====
198 senior faculty members at law schools in Israel issued a statement saying "We ... strongly oppose the regime change that the Israeli government is promoting under the guise of 'legal reforms'. These far-reaching constitutional changes include providing the government with absolute control over the appointment of the judiciary; near complete elimination of judicial review; dissolution of civil-servant ministerial legal counsels as gatekeepers; and undermining the freedom of the press. In aggregation, these proposals suffocate the independence of the judiciary, dissolve the separation of powers between the branches of governments, and eliminate the rule of law. No recognized democratic country in the world operates under such conditions. The combination of the proposed changes is alarming and dangerous. It will bring far-reaching infringements of human rights, and strip Israel's system of government of fundamental features of its structure as a democracy."

Professor Yifat Bitton said of the reform that "the [legal] protections for women were created over the years by the High Court of Justice... this reform uniquely touches on our lives as women, especially when the ability to appeal to the HCJ on decisions... will grow narrower."

The Law Professors' Forum for Democracy, a group which counts among its members Professors David Kretzmer, Frances Raday, Eyal Benvenisti, Alon Harel, David Enoch, Ruth Halperin-Kaddari, Menachem Mautner, Leora Bilsky, Hanoch Dagan, Eli Salzberger and Michal Tamir, has published over 50 position papers analyzing and criticizing the main legislative aspects of the reform. According to the Forum, while opinions about the details of individual proposals differ, the "host" of the government's proposals constitutes "an unprecedentedly severe attack on the independence of the judiciary, the Attorney General and government legal advisors, the police, the military, and public broadcasting", which it states "will seriously damage the rule of law and Israel's democratic character".

Commenting on the abolishment of the reasonableness cause, the Law Professors' Forum for Democracy opined that "the clear intention of the government's plans is to create an authoritarian regime in which the executive branch not only controls the legislative branch but can also do more or less what it likes, with no effective oversight or legal controls... The unreasonableness amendment is thus only the first step towards executive authoritarianism, stripping the courts from an entire body of jurisprudence that served as a primary constraint on executive arbitrariness, illegality, and corruption." The forum also addresses the government's policy towards Palestinians in the occupied West Bank, warning that the amendment could "[weaken] even further the highly limited legal protections they have enjoyed until now."

===== Practitioners =====
Israel Bar Association president Avi Himi has called on all Israelis to fight against the proposed reforms, saying "I expect all of them to understand that this war is the most important we've had in the country's 75 years of existence, and therefore I call on all of them to join."

17 top law firms in Israel published a joint statement against the reforms, warning against "harming the resilience and independence of the justice system and the system of checks and balances at the basis of the democratic regime we are so proud of, alongside the State of Israel being a Jewish state."

On 23 July the Israel Bar Association approved a tentative decision to appeal to the HCJ if legislation abolishing the reasonableness cause is passed. According to the association, abolishing the cause "would harm every public system in the State of Israel, and first and foremost the judicial, healthcare, education, and higher education systems."

==== Prominent civil servants ====
50 former director generals of government ministries published a statement that the planned overhaul "will cause unprecedented damage to Israel's economy". The signatories include former Ministry of Finance directors general, the former budget director at the Ministry of Finance Shaul Meridor, the former Prime Minister's Office director general Raanan Dinur, the former Ministry of Energy director general Udi Adiri, and the former Competition Authority director general Michal Halperin.

Alon Ushpiz, the retiring director general of the Ministry of Foreign Affairs, commented that "the state of Israel and its foreign policy need a strong and independent judiciary. We have a strategic, structural interest in this."

Professor Roni Strier, head of the Council for Food Security at the Ministry of Labor, Social Affairs and Social Services, warned Minister Ya'akov Margi of "[the reform's] detrimental effects on maintaining the resilience, transparency and equality of the social security systems in Israel".

==== Members, reservists and retirees of the security services ====
===== Officers and commanders =====
Former defense minister Moshe Ya'alon said: "This is the most important war in my life. We're in the midst of a legislative process which is like a D9 armored bulldozer that overruns the judiciary. (Note: The use of the D9 imagery dates back to 2015, when MK Moti Yogev called for "raising the blade of a D9 tractor on the HJC". He later retracted that statement.) It's clear that this is a coup. We're in an economic crisis, and we'll soon enter a security crisis."

A group of former national security advisers, including several appointed by Netanyahu, warned in an open letter that the intensity of the current "social and political conflict is endangering national resilience". They said it was therefore incumbent upon coalition and opposition leaders to hold "serious dialogue without pre-existing conditions ... to reach an agreed-upon framework regarding the relations between the legislative, executive and judicial branches". The letter was signed by the majority of national security advisers since the post was created in 1999 (during Netanyahu's first stint as premier). Among them are several Netanyahu appointees, including Uzi Arad, Yaakov Amidror, Yaakov Nagel and Yossi Cohen.

More than 400 former senior security officials, including former heads of the Israel Police, the Shin Bet and the Mossad, published a letter through the Commanders for Israel's Security group urging Israel's President not to sign any laws that contradict Israel's core democratic values as part of his efforts to mediate a compromise version of the government's judicial overhaul plan. The letter addressed to the President stated that the proposed changes pose real dangers for Israel's resilience, "it's standing among nations, its security, economy, and its unique connection to the Jewish people in the Diaspora". The rush of legislation is a "legal coup that will cause a tragedy for future generations".

Yuval Diskin, former head of the Shin Bet, wrote in an op-ed that the plan to weaken the independence of the judicial system would be "disastrous" if passed. He argued that "a true and strong democracy is our strongest weapon in our tough Middle Eastern neighborhood".

Former Israel Defense Forces chief of staff Dan Halutz claims that Israelis will not want to serve in the military if the government moves ahead with its judicial plans, stating that "draft dodging in a democracy is one thing, and draft dodging in a dictatorship is another. I think that soldiers and officers who recognize that there is a dictatorship here, will not want to become mercenaries of a dictator".

Former Mossad chief Tamir Pardo declared that Prime Minister Benjamin Netanyahu must resign for the good of the country and that every Israeli citizen should go out to protest.

Yoram Cohen, former head of the Shin Bet, has said that the government's judicial reform will "turn Israel from a democratic country to one which is not democratic. The goal of this reform is not to improve the judicial system, but to neutralize it". He added that "without a formal constitution the Supreme Court is the last beacon to defend rights in Israel".

Nadav Argaman, another former head of the Shin Bet, stated that "the great fear is that if these laws pass, then the State of Israel stands on the verge of dictatorship. And when it ... [does], we could see a dissolution of the [security] organizations, of the system ... There are people who would not be willing to serve in a situation where Israel a dictatorship, [and] then you don't need much for the system to cave into itself." He continued: "we ought not minimize it. It's a regime change, it's a coup, legally turning Israel into a dictatorship."

Roni Alsheich, former police chief and deputy head of the Shin Bet, stated that "The polls show a huge shift in public opinion toward a firm opposition to the judiciary overhaul. Right-wing and religious people like myself refuse to be enslaved to the brainwashing."

In a letter to Prime Minister Netanyahu and Defense Minister Yoav Gallant, all ten living former commanders of the Israeli Air Force (Amikam Norkin, Amir Eshel, Ido Nehustan, Eliezer Shkedi, Dan Halutz, Eitan Ben Eliahu, Herzl Bodinger, Avihai Ben Nun, David Ivri and Dan Tolkovsky) called on the Prime Minister to halt all legislation forming part of the judicial reform and to "find a solution to the situation as soon as possible". The letter said the retired commanders "are following with deep worry the processes taking place ... and are fearful of these processes and the severe and concrete danger to national security".

"Israeli President Isaac Herzog must take immediate steps to convene a constitutional assembly to protect Israeli democracy", a number of retired heads of the country's security services urged in a joint letter. The signatories included former prime minister and Israel Defense Forces Chief of Staff Ehud Barak, and former Chiefs of Staff Moshe Ya'alon and Dan Halutz; former Shin Bet chiefs Nadav Argaman, Yuval Diskin, Carmi Gilon and Yaakov Peri; former Mossad chief Tamir Pardo; and National Security Adviser Uzi Arad. They warned that the government's moves to undermine the independence of Israel's judiciary constitute a "coup d'état" that threatens to "turn Israel into a de facto dictatorship". Pardo was also a signatory of a petition by hundreds of Mossad veterans, including other former heads Nahum Admoni, Shabtai Shavit, Danny Yatom and Efraim Halevy, calling on the Knesset to "watch the separation of powers and the values of democracy".

One of the first members of the Palmach, the strike force of the Haganah pre-state militia, pledged to combat the government's attempt to weaken the country's judiciary, stating that he feels obligated "to protect the precious country we founded". 98-year-old Major General (res.) Amos Horev was photographed at a protest rally carrying a sign stating "I was one of the first Palmach [members and] I will fight for the defense of our state." During his long career, Horev served as the IDF Chief Armaments Officer and, later, was president of the Israel Institute of Technology.

On 22 July, a hundred former senior commanders and officers in the security services (including the IDF, Israel Police, Israel Prison Service, Mossad and Shin Bet) published a letter of support of leaving reservists (see below), stating that they see Netanyahu as directly responsible to the "severe damage" to the IDF and Israel's security.

In a 23 July meeting with Mossad officers, the organization's chief David Barnea said: "if the situation reaches a constitutional crisis I'll be on the right side, but now isn't the time." He later added: "we serve a democratic state. We're not in a constitutional crisis, and if we happen into one and have to, then we'll act according to our legal counsel. But we're not there."

According to media reports, prior to the vote on the abolishment of the reasonableness cause, IDF Chief of the General Staff Herzi Halevi sent a letter to Netanyahu, warning against the consequences of the legislation for civilians' trust in the military, and the military's internal cohesion. The letter also noted officials' concern that the dissent seen among the reserves (see below) will permeate into the permanent service and regular service. Halevi passed the letter to Netanyahu, who at the time was being hospitalized at the Sheba Medical Center; he also sought to meet Netanyahu in person just prior to the vote, but Netanyahu refused.

===== Reservists =====
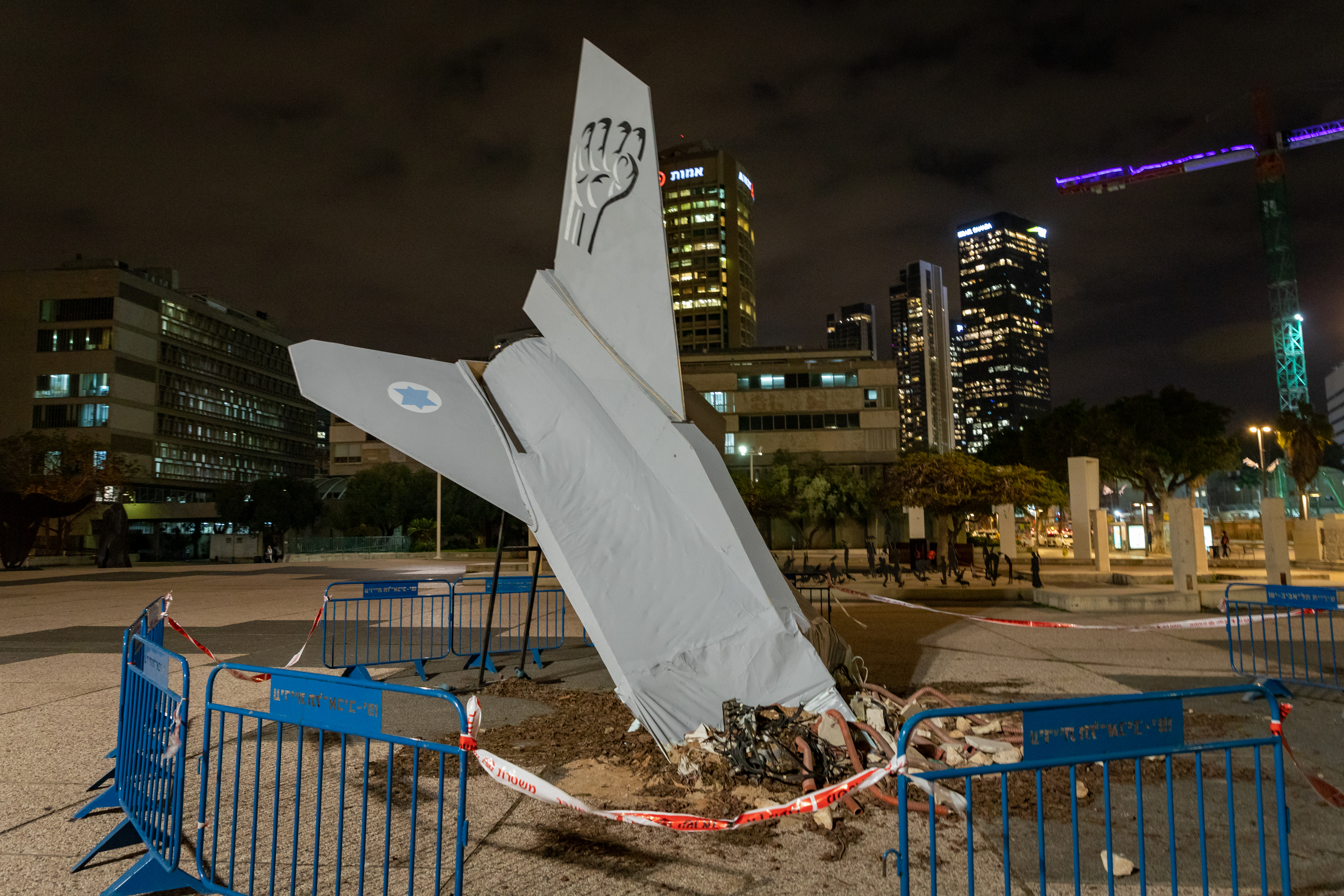
Sculpture representing the crashed tail of an Israeli Air Force jet, set up by protesting pilots in front of the Kirya

A brigadier general in the Israeli Air Force (IAF) reserves has asked to be discharged from service on moral grounds.

Dozens of reservists in the IDF Intelligence Corps special operations formation, including some in the rank of colonel and lieutenant colonel, have signed a petition stating they will no longer volunteer for service. According to the petition, "service under the special operations directorate requires complete alignment with the State's values, and fearless freedom of thought – things that will disappear if we become a dictatorship". The same day, it was a reported that a group of Mossad officers had asked, and received permission to participate in protests.

Dozens of reservists from the IDF Intelligence Corps research department have signed a letter to the government, stating that "if this dangerous legislation is passed, we will cease volunteering for reserve service".

A group of 300 reservists in the IDF Intelligence Corps Unit 8200 published an open letter to the government, warning against the legislation and its effect on the "integrity and security of the State of Israel ... the disintegration of social cohesion, damage to Israeli economy, its stability and its image", and stating that they would cease volunteering for reserve service if it passes.

About 150 Israeli army reservists who serve as cyber specialists have announced that they will stop reporting for duty if the judicial overhaul is advanced. They explained that as their service "requires the development and operation of capabilities that have the potential of misuse, the legitimacy to operate them is only backed up by the condition of Israel being a liberal and democratic country that has a strong and independent judicial system that allows a balance between the branches. A regime that has no judicial oversight, may use these capabilities immorally and in a way that is contradictory to democratic values."

The overwhelming majority of reserve pilots in the IAF 69 Squadron notified their commanding officers in the Israeli Air Force that they will not be participating in a training exercise scheduled for the following week in protest at the changes the government is making to the judicial system. Squadron 69 is one of the air force's leading units, operating advanced F-15 Thunder aircraft that serve as the army's long-range attack arm. The protesting pilots attended their base on the scheduled day but, instead of training, held a discussion about democracy and protest with the base commander. Tami Arad, widow of fallen IAF weapon systems officer Ron Arad offered her support for the 69 Squadron reservists.

Over 200 Israeli reservist military doctors signed a letter demanding that the government halt the legislative agenda "immediately and without pre-conditions". The doctors announced that they would no longer show up for reserve duty unless they can trust that the "government is acting from within the boundaries of a broad democratic national consensus whilst maintaining the democratic and egalitarian character of the state of Israel", which they feel should preserve "basic values" like "separation of powers, an independent judiciary and a sound legal framework to protect individual rights".

These events have raised concerns within the IDF. According to one veteran, a Lieutenant colonel, "if theses laws end up passing, the danger to Israel's security would increase tenfold because entire formations will disengage from the military. If anyone thinks they can carry out a legal coup without paying a price, they just don't understand what's happening in the trenches."

Retired members of Sayeret Matkal who served under Yonatan Netanyahu, Benjamin Netanyahu's brother, in Operation Entebbe, published a strong rebuke of the prime minister and his son.

After President Herzog's compromise proposal of 15 March was rejected by the governing coalition, 100 officers from a classified Israeli Air Force unit, including two former Air Force chiefs, issued a letter in which they wrote that "in the face of the constitutional situation developing in front of our eyes, which includes the demise of Israeli democracy as we know it, we fear that following military orders would be a violation of our oath, our conscience and our mission." A former commander of the special air force unit said: "This is a small unit. We never thought in our wildest nightmares that the greatest threat to Israel's survival as a Jewish and democratic country will be internal rather than an external enemy. Now that it is happening, we are determined to prevent it." He added, "now that the President's proposal was rebuffed so rudely, we have lost what little faith we still had and decided to take steps. I think there is a strong chance this group will not follow the orders of an undemocratic regime."

Over 100 Air Force reservists have announced that they will stop reporting for routine service, joining the military reserve boycott over the government's plan to change the judicial system. The signatories of this announcement occupy crucial roles such as control and command, planning, and intelligence. They include several senior officers, with the ranks of colonel and brigadier general.

In late June and early July, reservists from the IDF's Unit 8200, the Medical Corps, the Shaldag Unit and other operational and cyberwarfare units, said that they would stop volunteering if the reforms were advanced.

On 16 July, former Shayetet 13 commander and Mossad officer Nevo Erez announced that he was pausing his reserve service in protest of the legislation.

On 21 July, 1,142 reservists in the Israeli Air Force stated in a letter that they would stop volunteering if the reasonableness standard was revoked. An additional 50 people signed the letter the following day.

On 22 July, members of "Brothers In Arms" (Hebrew: אחים לנשק), a reservist protest movement, announced that a total 10,000 reservists would cease volunteering if the legislation passes.

On 23 July, 951 reservists in the Military Intelligence Directorate (MID), joined by 904 former reservists, sent a letter to the directorate head, announcing the pause of their volunteer service until further notice.

On 31 July, 60 officers of the elite Havatzalot Program notified their commanders that they would cease their volunteer reserve service "in light of the government's decision to begin changing... the Israeli system of government without wide agreement, while state officials blatantly ignore its devastating consequences for the IDF." They further state that "despite the sensitivity of [questions of security, checks and balances]... the legislation is being passed hastily, while completely ignoring experts' warnings of its economic, social and security consequences, and without wide agreement."

On 7 August it was reported that two out of five brigadier generals who serve as deputies to the Commander of the Navy and as the navy's operational commanders during wartime, have notified the commander of the cessation of their volunteer reserve service, citing concerns of Israel becoming a dictatorship. They join 160 officers who have previously signed a petition against the judicial reform.

In response to the 7 October incursions from the Gaza Strip, several organizations have paused their protests and called for anyone who is called for military service to "stand for the defense of Israel immediately and without hesitation".

==== Weapons manufacturing workers ====
Employees of Rafael Advanced Defense Systems warned that the coalition's judicial overhaul would severely harm Israeli society and the defense industry in particular. They wrote that in a country where "the government has power that is not restrained through checks and balances, the human capital required to develop weapons will be in a moral crisis" and expressed concern about the retirement of key employees and a drop in motivation among remaining employees, saying that "it will no longer be possible to recruit and retain excellent employees". They added that "the systems developed by Rafael, including Iron Dome, protect all Israeli citizens without distinction of religion, race, sex, political position and nationality" and that the values of the Declaration of Independence, including an independent and strong judicial system, are "the moral compass that guides us in our work, which is dedicated to the development of weapons that are at the forefront of technology, and which have the potential to maintain the qualitative advantage of the IDF and the State of Israel".

==== Israel Atomic Energy Commission staff ====
Brigadier general Ze'ev Snir, a former head of the Israel Atomic Energy Commission, warned Prime Minister Netanyahu against plowing ahead with the planned changes to the judicial system, saying that the deep internal divides over the contentious measures could leave Israel exposed to attack. He criticized the government for prioritising bills aimed at helping Netanyahu and his ally Aryeh Deri with their legal troubles, as well as state funding for the premier's family residences and clothing, while Iran is seeking to purchase fighter jets from Russia. Speaking of the proposed changes, Snir warned that they would undermine the balance of power between the branches of government, leaving the ruling majority "without any restraints", adding that "power corrupts and absolute power corrupts absolutely".

Almost 100 former managers and supervisors from Israel Atomic Energy Commission facilities, including the Dimona nuclear center, have issued a statement, opposing the proposed judicial changes. The signatories include two recent chiefs of Dimona, Maj. Gen. (ret.) Udi Adam and Dr. Udi Netzer.

==== Economists and financial experts ====
Amir Yaron, the governor of the Bank of Israel, has stated that it is "imperative" to maintain the independence of the judiciary. He added that the planned changes to the judicial system could undermine investment and spark an exodus of educated Israelis.

Two former Bank of Israel governors, Karnit Flug and Jacob Frenkel, published an op-ed stating that the reforms could negatively affect Israel's credit rating and "deal a severe blow to the economy and its citizens". They wrote that "Meticulous observance of the principle of separation of powers (the legislative, executive and judicial branches) is an iron principle upon which democracy is built and relies ... although there is broad support for the need for certain changes to the judicial system, the set of suggested steps entails significant risks to the nature of democratic government in Israel and its image in the world."

Nobel laureate Professor Daniel Kahneman stated that "the reform is a disaster, not only in terms of values. It will have tangible results in the economy, in Israel's political status and ultimately in its security as well."

In early February, top Israeli bankers, including ones from Bank Hapoalim, Bank Mizrahi, and the First International Bank of Israel told Finance Minister Bezalel Smotrich that investors were withdrawing funds from Israel "at a rate ten times higher than usual", the shekel was showing weakness, and the Israeli stock market was declining compared to other exchanges. Uri Levin, the chief executive officer of Israel Discount Bank, said "There are negative indications and Israel's risk factor is rising."

In mid February 2023, Ynet News reported that "about 50 companies", predominantly from the tech sector, withdrew funds from Israel, and over $4 billion was moved out of Israel over a span of three weeks.

On 21 February 2023, Bank of Israel Deputy Governor Andrew Abir reported that the shekel was being harmed by "political uncertainty". That same day, the shekel declined to its weakest level since March 2020, falling more than 2% to a three-year low.

In response to a question from the Minister of Economy, Nir Barkat, about the possible danger to Israel economy due to the reform, the Chief Economist at the Ministry of Finance, Shira Greenberg, warned against an economic "snowball effect" that will cause severe damage to the economy. Bank of Israel Governor Amir Yaron similarly warned against a sudden economic shift that will cause "severe damage to the Israel economy that will be very hard to stop". Greenberg estimates that demoting Israel on democracy and governance indices would lead to a 0.8% reduction in per-capita growth, amounting to NIS 270 billion over five years, and NIS 385 billion over ten.

The widely predicted decline in the shekel came after national and foreign investors offered numerous warnings about the impact of the judicial reform, with IBI Investment House chief economist Rafi Gozlan saying, "Should the proposed judicial changes be fully passed this is very worrying as Israel is going to have a very different economy from where we are now with a strong government and no separation of institutional power."

200 former staffers of the Ministry of Finance, including former directors general Keren Terner-Eyal, David Brodet, Yarom Ariav and Yael Andorn, and former heads of the Budgets Division Shaul Meridor, Ori Yogev, Gal Hershkovitz and Udi Nisan, signed a letter calling on Smotrich to "act to halt immediately the rapid legislative process for changing the form of government in Israel, because of the grave fear of irreversible damage to the Israeli economy and to the social fabric in Israel".

Speaking at a demonstration against the reform, former governor of the Bank of Israel Jacob Frenkel (1991–2000) said that "we have never experienced such extensive destruction of value in such a short time, and not by external enemies, but by government policy... economic growth has been damaged, the shekel has depreciated, investment has collapsed, the stock market has been faltering, the technology industry, which generates a quarter of the country's direct tax revenue and accounts for more than half of Israel's exports, has sustained and continues to sustain a huge blow... Worst of all, our human capital, the tech workers, the cyber experts, scientists and physicians, are looking for ways of emigrating. These are just the first buds. We are still not feeling the true consequences." He called on Netanyahu, with whom he worked during the latter's first term in office (1996–1999), "for the sake of the future of our children and grandchildren... to prevent a descent into the abyss."

==== Business leaders, investors and entrepreneurs ====
As a result of uncertainty and a significant amount of tech sector opposition to the proposed policies, the Israeli tech sector warned in January 2023 that firms may begin withdrawing money from Israel. On 26 January 2023, the firms Papaya Global and Disruptive AI withdrew their funds from the country, citing their decision as "a painful but necessary business step". On 1 February 2023, the CEO of Verbit, Tom Livne, stated that he will leave Israel and has started withholding investments in Israel. On 7 February 2023, two more firms, Wiz and Skai.io, announced that they planned to withdraw their funds from Israel.

Executives of Israel's retail banks also issued warnings to the government based on their observations of movement of money outside of Israel following the reform's announcement. According to news reports, "Bank Hapoalim CEO Dov Kotler told Netanyahu that banks have started to see an outflow of funds in recent days, with various savings accounts being moved from Israel abroad. Israel Discount Bank CEO Uri Levin said: 'It's impossible to ignore all the economic figures expressing so much concern over the moves, and therefore you need to stop immediately and only advance changes cautiously and with broad agreement.'"

Leo Bakman, the president and one of the founders of the Israel Institute for Innovation, a nonprofit organization that serves as an incubator for 2,500 startups has said "If I thought this [judicial] 'reform' was like shooting oneself in the foot, I would probably think twice about speaking out. But I believe that we are shooting ourselves in the head."

Alon Nisim Cohen, founder of high-tech company CyberArk has said that he "sees a great danger to democracy, a danger to my beloved country, a danger to everything that is true to me". Cohen, whose company is valued at six billion dollars, said that he now "sees my life's work, the Israeli high-tech industry, in great danger. If, God forbid, they succeed in carrying out the coup and undermine democracy, this magnificent Israeli locomotive that was built for 30 years may to go off the rails very quickly. Investors are looking for stability. No big investor will invest his money in a dictatorial regime, even foreign money that is already here will flee to more stable places." Cohen added that "the economy is just the beginning. Once the dam bursts, nothing is immune anymore."

CEO of Pitango, Chemi Peres, warned the Knesset in late February that "huge companies want to get their money out of Israel" and that "this is legislation that is dangerous to the economy and the government has chosen to shut its ears."

In an investor conference that took place on 15 February, a series of institutional investment fund executives warned against financial instability and the effect it will have on public savings.

Serial technology entrepreneur Benny Schneider warned against the move, highlighting the effects it would have on Israelis considering repatriation, on foreign investment, and on intellectual property.

Israeli cybersecurity company Riskified stated in an email to employees that it will transfer all of its cash and cash equivalents in Israel, totaling some US$500 million, abroad. It also stated that it will support employees wishing to relocate to Lisbon, where the company maintains a research and development center.

Leaders of Israel's business community, including the CEOs of Bank Leumi, Bank Mizrahi, Bank Hapoalim and the First International Bank of Israel, as well as the heads of the Azrieli Group, Super-Pharm and other large companies, wrote an open letter to Prime Minister Netanyahu, saying: "We call on you to immediately stop the planned legislative moves, chief among them the law to change the committee for the selection of judges. This law seriously harms the legal system and undermines the foundations of democracy based on the separation of powers and the independence of the legal system, and turns Israel into a dictatorship." The letter goes on to say that "This move will seriously damage Israel's economy, and beyond that it will damage Israeli society as a whole, its resilience, its security and its values." The letter "rejects with disgust the threats and attacks on the gatekeepers in Israel, the High Court of Justice, the attorney general, the IDF, the Shin Bet and the police."

In a press conference following the release of the company's quarterly financial reports, Check Point founder and CEO Gil Shwed said: "for years we fought for the registration of our activity in Israel and we have been here for 30 years, but I don't know if this is what would have happened today. Neither on the economic side nor on the political side."

==== Political science, international relations and national security experts ====
Almost 300 academic researchers in the fields of international relations, political science, and game theory have signed a petition against the changes, calling on the government "to maintain the strength of its judiciary and other institutions that are essential for a strong democracy to thrive, especially in the current international context".

The Institute for National Security Studies (INSS) issued a statement calling for an "immediate halt" to the reform, claiming that it would "severely impact the IDF's performance, diminish Israel's ability to handle its enemies, risk the relationship with the US and sabotage the economy's resilience".

==== Historians ====
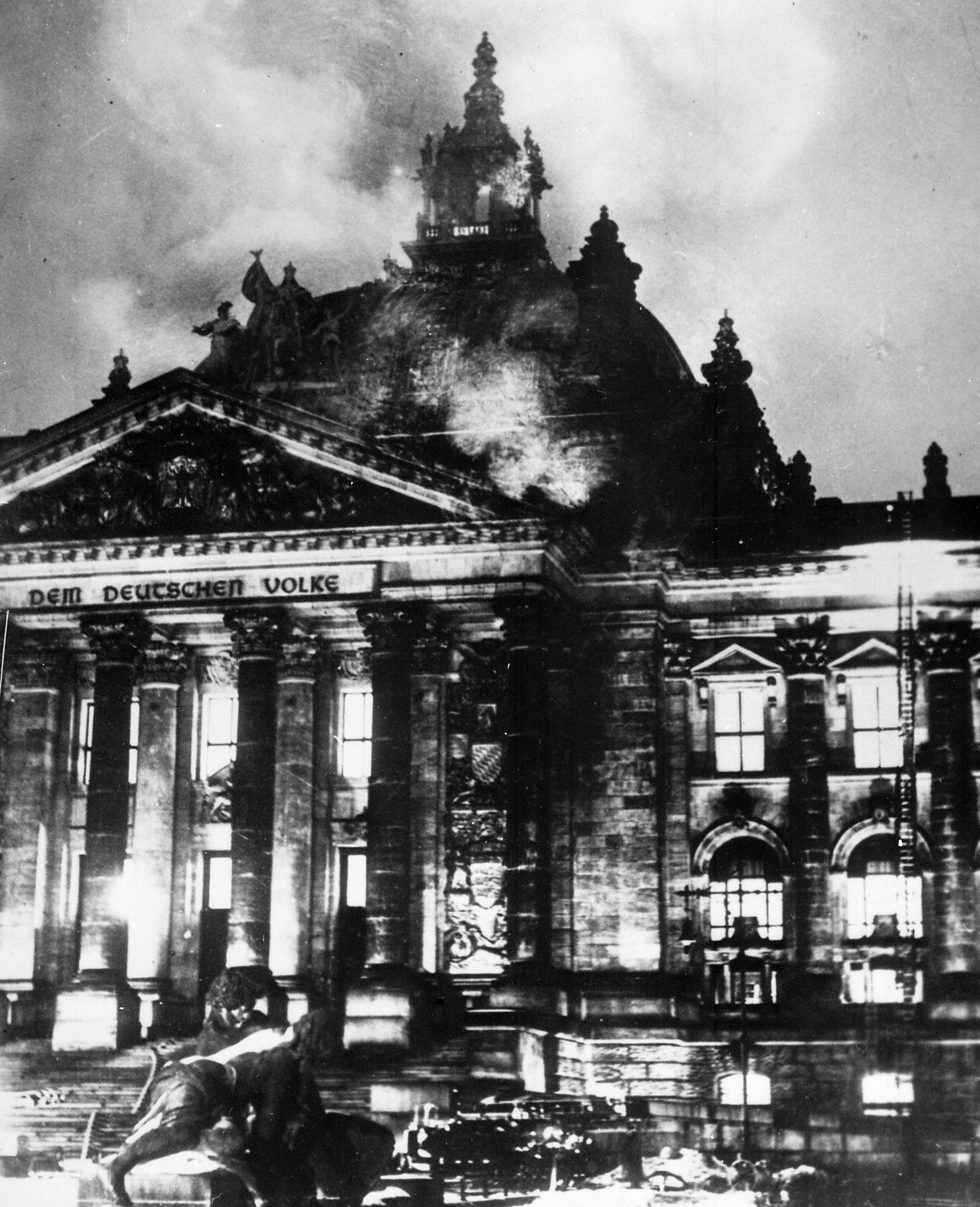
The Reichstag fire arson attack on the German parliament building in 1933 was used to justify the passage of the Enabling Act, which Daniel Blatman compared to the judicial reforms.

Professor Daniel Blatman, a historian of the Holocaust at the Institute for Contemporary Jewry at the Hebrew University of Jerusalem, stated in an interview with Haaretz that "Israel's Government Has neo-Nazi Ministers. It Really Does Recall Germany in 1933". He elaborated, "One thing we do see here is a regime that is starting to execute a speedy judicial, political, moral revolution – like in Germany. From January 1933, it was all over. Within half a year the country became unrecognizable". Journalists and others repeated or elaborated on his compassion. When asked about the proposed judicial reforms, said that "In a democracy, a stable and independent legal system is the foundation of all public, economic, social and political activity. ... If these judicial 'reforms' are implemented, in a reality as complex as that of Israel, it will lead to disaster".

Professor Yuval Noah Harari, of the Department of History at the Hebrew University of Jerusalem, wrote regarding any new judicial system: "[W]e must keep asking: 'What limits will there be on the power of the government under the new regime?' Let's say that the governing coalition decides to pass a law depriving Arabs of the right to vote – does any mechanism exist that can obstruct such a move? In other democracies, there are many mechanisms that can prevent the passage of such a racist and antidemocratic law. In Israel, at present, there is only one such mechanism: the Supreme Court. If a majority of Knesset members votes in favor of disenfranchising Arabs, or in favor of denying workers the right to strike, or in favor of closing down all the newspapers that dare to criticize the government – the Supreme Court is the only institution authorized to intervene and strike down such legislation. How will we know that ... it's time to stop demonstrating and consider a compromise? ... [T]he key question each one of us will have to ask ourselves regarding any such arrangement is: 'What will limit the power of the government? If a majority of Knesset members wants to deprive Arabs of the right to vote, or ban all opposition newspapers, or jail women for wearing shorts – what is the mechanism that will prevent this?'"

==== Medical and healthcare professionals ====
Yael Sherer, director of the Lobby to Combat Sexual Violence, commented that much of the medical and psychological treatment of victims of sexual violence is grounded in reasonableness: "if I appeal to the HJC today, then it can force the state [to provide care] thanks to the National Health Insurance Law that has the word 'reasonable' in it. But if we abolish reasonableness then there's no standard [of care] that is reasonable, the law is emptied of meaning, and the entire medical service will worsen at once."

Dr. Rani Barnea, head of the Stroke Prevention Center at Beilinson Hospital, wrote an op-ed detailing the potential effects the reform would have on the medical system. According to Barnea, the reform could negatively affect patients' ability to exercise their right to healthcare; the professional independence of the medical system; the quality of medical training and treatment; and academic freedom and scientific research. Barnea also raised his concern about the impact the changes will have on the weakest members of society, such as the elderly, the disabled, inmates and refugees, as well as women.

In an 18 July letter to Prime Minister Netanyahu, the chair of the Israel Medical Association (IMA), Professor Zion Hagay, called for Netanyahu "to remove the threat that hovers over the healthcare system and the Israeli society at large", and threatening a 2-hour warning strike". The strike took place the following day. The following week, after the abolishment of the reasonableness clause, the association declared a labor dispute and a 24-hour strike, but was cut short by a ruling of the National Labor Court.

According to media reports, a Telegram group called "Physicians for relocation", which was created shortly after the abolishment of the reasonableness clause, registered more than 1,000 members in less than 24 hours. By Wednesday the number of members passed 3,000, leading to an emergency Zoom meeting between physicians and senior officials of the public healthcare system. Israel is already experiencing a shortage of physicians, with only 29,000 practitioners nationwide – a shortage that is only expected to grow in the coming years.

On 7 August, "The White Robes" – a protest group comprising, according to IMA estimates, some 6,000 physicians and 2,000 other healthcare workers – announced its intention to strike in the event of a constitutional crisis arising from the government's refusal to abide by supreme court rulings. (Note: Originally: "We declare that in the event of a constitutional crisis, we will be forced not to report for work until such time as the government continues to respect the rulings of the Supreme Court" ("אנו מצהירים כי במצב של משבר חוקתי, ניאלץ לא להתייצב לעבודה עד אשר הממשלה תחזור לכבד את פסיקות בית המשפט העליון").)

According to a survey of Israeli medical students conducted for the nonprofit ScienceAbroad, only 30% of students studying abroad intend on returning to Israel once they complete their studies, down from 46% who intended to do so before the reasonableness cause was abolished.

According to a letter by Israeli and American academics published in the Lancet, the abolishment of the reasonableness cause "risks weakening the Health in All Policies approach, potentially leading to unchecked decisions without consideration of the health implications", as well as "[setting] a troubling precedent for nations with judicial systems that are unable to sustain accountability."

==== Others ====
Nasreen Haddad Haj-Yahya, a partner at The Portland Trust, said that "if judges with a right-leaning world view are appointed, the harm to Arab women will be much greater than to other groups. A liberal woman from Tel Aviv has many more options... than a disenfranchised woman living in the Arab, patriarchal, traditional society in the countryside ... this is also true of other disenfranchised groups in Israeli society, such as Ethiopian and [Jewish] Orthodox women".

Assaf Sagiv, former editor-in-chief of Azure, the leading periodical of the right, said in an interview: "[this] is what we can expect if the proposed reform is implemented: the dismantlement of the state's institutions, splitting the spoils between party bosses who are battling one another for power and resources, loss of public security, looting of the public coffers and deterioration into general lawlessness."

Miriam Adelson, the publisher of Israel Hayom, wrote an article saying that "Regardless of the substance of the reforms, the government's dash to ratify them is naturally suspect, raising questions about the root objectives and concern that this is a hasty, injudicious, and irresponsible move."

The National Council for Research and Development, operating under the auspices of the Ministry of Science and Technology, sent a letter to minister Ofir Akunis warning against the detrimental effects of the reform on Israel's scientific research activities.

Journalist Ilana Dayan warned against the harm the legislation will cause to "gays, women, Arabs, reporters, lecturers, the poor, and later Haredim and others". Commenting on the proposed changes, she stated that "a regime [that wishes to make these changes] takes us to a place that no democracy has ever come from alive. A regime does not grab this amount of power just for show." She admitted that errors have been made by former Supreme Court President Aharon Barak and the HJC, but stated that "there's nothing in this 'reform' that will address them. It [does have] the absorption of great, ultimate power into just one place."

About 1,000 Israeli cultural figures, including David Grossman, Nurit Zarchi and Ilana Bernstein, have signed a letter, stating that Israel "is currently facing a most terrible crisis ... [where the] elected government [is attempting] to turn it from a flourishing democracy into a theocratic dictatorship."

Haaretz's Carolina Landsmann, Aluf Benn and Amira Hass have all noted a connection between the occupation of the West Bank and settlement phenomenon, and the judicial reform.

1,600 staff members in several Israeli universities have signed a statement in support of a general strike, if the government does not abide by a Supreme Court ruling on the reasonableness cause.

On 17 August, the journal Science published an editorial by professors Einat Albin, Shikma Bressler, Asya Rolls, Michal Schwartz and Ehud Shapiro, that highlighted the "status of Israeli scholarship on the global stage", and called on "the global academic community... [to] unite and work together vigorously to resist attempts in Israel to undermine academic freedom".

=== Reactions partially supporting the changes ===
Former Supreme Court Justice Jacob Turkel initially expressed limited support for the reforms in a radio interview. He said: "I wouldn't change anything in the (proposed) legislation. I would pass the reform and see how it works ... I don't think that there is any danger to democracy. Things need to be done cautiously and we'll hope for the best." However, Turkel expressed disagreement with the details of the reform, stating that the proposed majority for overriding the Supreme Court needs to be larger, and that the concept of "reasonableness" should not be removed entirely from the court's remit. Turkel subsequently signed the statement published by 18 former Supreme Court judges, opposing the reforms.

Former justice minister Daniel Friedmann also expressed partial support for the reforms.

=== Reactions fully supporting the changes ===
Berachyahu Lifshitz, the former Dean of the Hebrew University faculty of law, wrote that the scaremongering about the end of democracy promulgated by opponents of the reform is overblown and that history shows that Israel was a vibrant democracy before the changes of the 1990s that the current reform seeks to undo, and will continue to be one if the reform passes.

== International reactions ==
=== Reactions opposing the changes ===
==== Jewish organizations ====
===== Australia =====
The Executive Council of Australian Jewry and the Zionist Federation of Australia issued a joint statement saying "[We] express our serious concern at the governing coalition's proposals to make fundamental changes to the relationship between the Knesset and the judiciary with undue haste and in the absence of broad-based public support. [...] We call on the governing coalition to heed the call from Israeli President Isaac Herzog for genuine dialogue, based on his five principles for judicial reform, and to pause all of these controversial proposals so that constructive dialogue can occur and a national consensus can begin to emerge."

===== North America =====
====== Union for Reform Judaism ======
The Union for Reform Judaism has condemned the proposed judicial reforms, stating that "If implemented, these reforms will dramatically weaken Israel's democracy, eviscerating any meaningful checks and balances that provide a separation of powers — a backbone of secure democracies." Their statement went on to say "Because Israel has no constitution, no bill of rights, and no second parliamentary chamber, the High Court is the only check and balance in existence. Once these "reforms" are instituted, the people in power need never relinquish it. There will be no other branch of government to rein them in. [...] The Government of Israel and Jewish organizations around the world should heed carefully the urgent warnings of Israeli judicial experts such as former Supreme Court Justice and former attorney general Menachem Mazuz, who recently stated: 'I don't know of anything in the literature of political science that will enable a country [with a separation of powers as delineated by [Minister] Levin's plan] to be considered a democracy.... in such a reality, effectively in Israel the only body that can rein in a tyranny of the majority is the judicial system. This restrictive power, they want to annul.' The statement ended with a "call on Minister Levin to withdraw his proposal, and on all lawmakers to unequivocally reject it."

Rabbi Rick Jacobs, president of the Union for Reform Judaism, said that Diaspora Jews were "deeply concerned" about proposed changes to Israel's democracy. "With only 61 votes the Knesset could override the rights of millions such as the LGBTQ community, women, Palestinians citizens of Israel and non-Orthodox Jews", he said. "We know how precarious it can be to live as a minority. But we also know that our concepts of equal rights for all, our rule of law, our independent courts — our democracy — is what protect us."

====== Masorti/Conservative Judaism movement ======
Representatives of the global Masorti/Conservative Judaism movement have backed Israel's President Isaac Herzog's call to suspend pending legislation to overhaul the Israeli judicial system and to organize a national dialogue to "identify a better path forward that guarantees the rights of all Israelis and preserves the State of Israel as the Jewish and democratic nation-state of the Jewish people around the world." They expressed their "grave concern" that legislation to allow the Knesset to overturn High Court rulings invalidating laws would "eviscerate the already fragile balance of power between the branches of Israel's government." Among those who signed the letter were the Rabbinical Assembly, an international association of Conservative rabbis; Masorti Israel, the movement's Israeli arm; and the Jewish Theological Seminary, the flagship Conservative educational institution. "Weakening Israel's highly-regarded judicial system would undermine the message we have proudly and successfully promoted for decades around the world that Israel is both a Jewish AND a democratic state", the groups stated. "With the mounting global disapproval of the proposed plan, moving forward risks serious economic, diplomatic and strategic consequences", they stated. "We call on all Jews worldwide to join us in making our voices heard at this historic juncture for Israel and the Jewish people as a whole."

====== Jewish Federations of North America ======
The Jewish Federations of North America have released a letter addressed to Prime Minister Benjamin Netanyahu and opposition head Yair Lapid, urging negotiations on the judicial overhaul plan, and stating "We urge you to make clear that a majority of just sixty-one votes of the Knesset is not sufficient to override a decision of the Supreme Court. The essence of democracy is both majority rule and protection of minority rights."

====== National Council of Jewish Women ======
The National Council of Jewish Women has issued a statement saying that "A fair and qualified judiciary is a crucial element of a healthy democracy where women, children, and families can thrive. But proposals from the new Israeli government seek to override the powers of Israel's Supreme Court to review governmental actions and Knesset legislation and increase governmental influence over judicial appointments. Such an overhaul [...] threatens the dignity, equity and justice of everyone in the region." The statement adds "Without a strong, independent and impartial judiciary, women, children and families across the spectrum of Israeli society are likely to suffer dire consequences."

====== American Jewish Committee ======
In a 24 July press release, the American Jewish Committee expressed its "profound disappointment" over that day's legislation abolishing the reasonableness clause. According to organization, "while many Israelis agree that some reform of Israel's judicial system is warranted... reform to the institutions core to Israeli democracy should only be adopted on the basis of the broadest possible consensus." The release also stated that "dramatic changes to Israel's judicial system should result from a deliberative and inclusive process that upholds the democratic values of maintaining checks and balances, respecting minority rights and civil liberties, and preserving essential judicial independence."

====== Others ======
Over 200 American Jewish leaders have signed a statement expressing their "concern that the new government's direction mirrors anti-democratic trends that [they] see arising elsewhere [...] rather than reinforcing the shared democratic values that are foundational to the U.S.-Israel relationship." Their statement continues "We are, for example, concerned about the Israeli Justice Minister's plan to limit the Supreme Court's power [...]."

The former director of the Anti-Defamation League Abraham Foxman has said that "it is critical that this new government not [...] tamper with Israel's democracy, its institutions, its legal systems, its civil rights of Arab minorities [...]."

===== United Kingdom =====
Thirteen Jewish organizations active in the UK have launched a campaign called Choose Democracy, asking members of the Jewish diaspora to add their names to a statement saying "We cannot be silent as Israel's new government seeks to [...] Undermine the rule of law and curtail human rights [...]". The sponsoring organizations are Arzenu UK, Habonim Dror UK, Jewish Labour Movement, Liberal Judaism, LJY-Netzer, Masorti Judaism, Meretz UK, Movement for Reform Judaism, New Israel Fund, Noam Masorti Youth, RSY-Netzer, Union of Jewish Students and Yachad. The statement has collected over 2,000 signatures.

The United Jewish Israel Appeal has stated that the UJIA remains committed to the values that have always informed its work with Israel but added "We are profoundly concerned that recent proposals to weaken the independence of Israel's judiciary together with actions and statements from members of the current Israeli government are undermining these values."

==== Politicians ====
===== EU =====
According to Nabila Massrali, Spokesperson for Foreign Affairs and Security Policy for the European External Action Service, the EU is following events in Israel "closely and with concern". According to the spokesperson, "EU-Israel relations are based on shared values, including the separation of powers and the rule of law... [and] it is important that the core values on which our partnership is based are preserved." The statement calls on the Israeli government "to continue to seek a broad consensus and aim for a process that is inclusive... [and] reach a compromise which would be acceptable for the Israeli citizens and political parties."

===== Germany =====
Steffen Seibert, the German ambassador to Israel, said that Germany believes an independent justice system is a tenet of democracy and is closely watching the Israeli dispute over a government plan for judicial change. "Democracy is more than the temporary power of the democratically elected majority", Seibert said. "It is also about the preservation of the rights of minorities, and it is also about the proper balance of power and that's where an independent judiciary comes in", said Seibert, adding that Germany was closely watching the fierce debate.

German foreign minister Annalena Baerbock said "... we abroad are concerned about some of the legislative plans in Israel. Among the values that unite us is the protection of constitutional principles such as the independence of the judiciary." In July, following the abolishment of the reasonableness clause, a spokesperson for Baerbock stated that "strong institutions, an independent judiciary and clear rules for the separation of powers are important for every democracy... and that includes Israel."

===== United Kingdom =====
Margaret Hodge MP, the parliamentary chair of the Jewish Labour Movement, wrote that "Netanyahu's government plans to undermine judicial independence by instituting the political appointment of judges and introducing a new 'overriding' clause, allowing any decision by the supreme court of Israel to be overridden by a simple majority vote in the Knesset. This would destroy the independence of the judiciary. This is especially damaging because Israel does not have a written constitution and depends on its basic laws, upheld by an independent judiciary, to protect fundamental rights."

On 25 July the Foreign, Commonwealth and Development Office released a statement "[urging] the Israeli government to build consensus and avoid division, ensuring that a robust system of checks and balances and the independence of Israel's judiciary are preserved". The statement also stressed that "democratic values" underpinned the countries' relationship.

===== France =====
On 24 July the Ministry for Europe and Foreign Affairs released a statement "[calling] on the Israeli authorities to address every issue that is fundamental to the institutions of democratic countries in a spirit of consensus". The statement also stressed that "democratic principles" formed the basis of the countries' relationship.

===== United States =====
====== President ======
President Joe Biden wrote "The genius of American democracy and Israeli democracy is that they are both built on strong institutions, on checks and balances, on an independent judiciary. Building consensus for fundamental changes is really important to ensure that the people buy into them so they can be sustained".

In a July 2023 interview with Thomas Friedman, Biden stated that "the vibrancy of Israel's democracy... must remain the core of our bilateral relationship... my recommendation to Israeli leaders is not to rush. I believe the best outcome is to continue to seek the broadest possible consensus".

====== Senators ======
Senator Dick Durbin, the chairman of the Senate Judiciary Committee, has said that he is concerned that Netanyahu is "dangerously putting his own narrow political and legal interests — and those of the troubling extremists in his coalition — ahead of the long-term interests and needs of Israel's democracy."

Senator Ben Cardin, the second-ranking Democrat on the Senate Foreign Relations Committee, has said "I am fearful for the future of democracy in Israel as the right-wing Netanyahu government threatens to undermine the essential checks-and-balances that make democracies work. I urge the prime minister and his cabinet to listen to President Isaac Herzog and the hundreds of thousands of Israelis who have taken to the streets in peaceful protest to protect the independence of the judiciary." Cardin continued, "If Mr. Netanyahu wants to demonstrate real strength and courage, I implore him to not turn his country away from democracy but return to the roots and values that have made his country flourish and grow. There is still time to correct course and put the long-term health of Israeli democracy over short-term personal power."

Senator Chris Van Hollen is worried about the legislation's implications. "An independent judiciary is a key hallmark of any democracy and serves as a safeguard of the people's rights and freedoms", he says. "That's why the Netanyahu government's actions to undermine the independence of the Israeli judicial branch are especially concerning."

Senator Tim Kaine said that "As tens of thousands of Israelis rally in support of democracy and judicial independence in their country, the Netanyahu administration should listen and avoid taking actions that threaten Israel's democratic institutions."

Senator Jeff Merkley says that America's "robust, 75-year alliance with Israel is built on a shared commitment to democratic values. Strong, independent institutions — especially the judiciary — are core to a healthy democracy. Concentrating all power in one person or one party is a threat to the rule of law."

====== Representatives ======
Representative Jerry Nadler, ranking member of the House Judiciary Committee, wrote that he is "particularly distressed about the latest reported plans of Israel's new minister of justice to undermine the judiciary and the system of checks and balances. Enacting the Override Clause, stripping legal advisors of their authority, canceling the "reasonableness standard"—all of these proposals undermine the judiciary's authority, which is fundamental to a functioning democracy."

Representative Jamie Raskin, ranking member of the House Oversight Committee, has stated that the Netanyahu government's plan to weaken the Supreme Court would put Israel in the same category as repressive governments that are widely condemned in the global arena. "All over the world liberal democracy is under siege by right-wing autocrats and fanatical extremists who are in a coordinated global attack on freedom", says Raskin. "Fortunately, the forces of strong democracy, judicial independence, human rights and women's equality, religious pluralism and the rule of law are on the march too", he said, adding that "The struggle to defend the separation of powers, judicial independence and the rule of law in Israel is now a significant part of this global defense of democratic freedom against corrupt plutocrats and autocrats hellbent on power at all costs."

Representative Brad Sherman, a member of the House Committee on Foreign Affairs, has said "I see the mistakes the current government is making". He added "[J]udicial review is a good idea. It's good to have basic democratic principles and a Supreme Court that can make sure you adhere to them."

Representative David Cicilline, a member of the House Judiciary Committee, said that "The sweeping judicial overhaul proposal championed by Israel's new far-right government would be catastrophic for the future of Israeli democracy and our shared democratic values. Any attempts to change existing judicial processes must go through a rigorous review process, including building a broad consensus with input from opposition parties and civil society."

Representative Jim McGovern, ranking member of the House Rules Committee and ranking member of the Tom Lantos Human Rights Commission (a bipartisan caucus of the House of Representatives), said that he strongly opposes "Netanyahu's decision to [...] gut the independence of the Israeli Supreme Court."

Representative Dan Goldman said that he is "concerned by the new Israeli government's efforts to subvert the independence of the judiciary in a way that undermines Israel's status as a beacon of freedom and democracy." He added "I care deeply and personally about the safety and security of the Israeli state. But part of that safety and security is an unwavering commitment to separation of powers and the rule of law, which must be upheld by a strong and independent judicial branch."

Representative Steve Cohen described the Israeli government's efforts to change the judicial system and the balance of powers in Israel as "a very disturbing and concerning set of events." Netanyahu's coalition, he warned, "is apparently trying to change the judiciary in such a way that the executive and the legislature will have much more control and the independent judiciary will disappear."

Representative Jan Schakowsky says she is "deeply concerned by the far-right's proposal to restrict the independence and powers of Israel's judiciary. I fear it would jeopardize Israeli democracy and undermine the U.S.-Israel relationship." She added "I hope the protesters will be heard and that this plan will be abandoned."

Representative Earl Blumenauer echoes those comments, saying that "a radical overhaul of the judiciary is ill advised and appears to have severe implications for Israel."

Representative Mark DeSaulnier says that he is "deeply concerned by proposals in Israel to undermine its democratic institutions by dramatically overhauling the judicial system."

Representative Melanie Stansbury notes that "across the world, modern democracies depend on systems of checks and balances to ensure the balance of power and ensure that governments remain accountable to their people and the rule of law."

Representative Anna Eshoo warns that "the strength of the U.S.-Israel relationship is rooted in our mutual commitment to democracy. By moving forward with his proposal to gut the Israeli judiciary, Prime Minister Netanyahu is not only jeopardizing Israel's democratic institutions, he is straining the critical relationship between our countries."

Representative Barbara Lee notes that "an impartial, independent judiciary is a vital cornerstone of democracy. I strongly condemn Netanyahu's efforts to politicize Israel's Supreme Court."

Sixteen Jewish Representatives including Jerry Nadler, Brad Schneider, Jamie Raskin, Elissa Slotkin, Debbie Wasserman Schultz and Susan Wild sent a letter to President Herzog, Prime Minister Netanyahu and Opposition Leader Lapid, expressing their "profound concern about [the] proposed changes... [which] could undermine Israeli democracy and the civil rights and religious freedoms it protects."

According to Representative Ro Khanna, whose constituency includes much of what is known as "Silicon Valley", the valley's high-tech investors were "leaving Israel". Khanna stated that he "certainly believe[s] that Israel is a friend and ally, but we want to have that grounded around democracy and the rule of law."

====== Others ======
Former mayor of New York City Michael Bloomberg warned against damage to Israel's economy, security, and relations with the United States if the reform is passed.

==== Members of the legal profession ====
Prominent US lawyer Alan Dershowitz has said that "he cannot defend sweeping judicial reforms planned by Israel's new government." Dershowitz also said that the move would be a "terrible mistake" and "If I were in Israel I would be joining the protests." "On the other hand," he wrote, "some reforms ... are consistent with my red lines and the preservation of basic rights and judicial independence. These include permitting Knesset overrides of decisions that are primarily political ... or economic.... Similarly, eliminating the current veto judges have over their successors would be acceptable."

Former Canadian justice minister and attorney general Irwin Cotler has said the legislation proposed by the government would "eviscerate judicial review", "undermine the independence of the judiciary", and "vest undue power" in the government. Cotler also rejected comparisons made by Netanyahu between the proposed reforms and Canada's judicial system, reportedly stating that Canada's override law was created within the framework of a charter of basic rights and freedoms, which Israel lacks, and that some of the most fundamental rights are in any case not subject to the override clause.

Over 190 US/Canadian law professors have signed a statement saying "We, law professors in the United States and Canada who care deeply about Israel, strongly oppose the effort by the current Israeli government to radically overhaul the country's legal system. This effort includes proposed reforms that would grant the ruling coalition absolute power to appoint Justices and judges, make it almost impossible for the Supreme Court to invalidate legislation, severely limit judicial review of executive-branch decisions, and curtail the independence of the Attorney General and legal advisers assigned to different government agencies." The statement says that the signatories do not have a uniform view about the powers of the Israeli Supreme Court, but that they "are all deeply worried that the speed and scale of the reforms will seriously weaken the independence of the judiciary, the separation of powers and the rule of law."

Over 150 Canadian jurists, including former chief justice of the Supreme Court Beverley McLachlin, six other former Justices of the Supreme Court, and legal academics and practicing lawyers, published a statement against the reforms, expressing their concern that the changes "will weaken democratic governance, undermine the rule of law, jeopardize the independence of the judiciary, impair the protection of human rights, and diminish the international respect currently accorded to Israeli legal institutions."

Ruvi Ziegler, the programme director for LLMs in International Law, Human Rights and Advanced Legal Studies at the University of Reading, has written that the planned reform:

- "would significantly weaken constitutional review of human rights violations, leaving Israel's already vulnerable minorities subject to the exercise of untrammeled power by a simple coalition majority",
- "undermines the independence of the judiciary by altering a long-standing balanced Judicial Appointment Committee, handing over absolute power to the government of the day",
- "would neuter legal advice given by the civil service",
- "would strip courts of their power to hold the Executive properly accountable for its administrative decisions".

Anthony Julius, one of Britain's most prominent Jewish lawyers, has fiercely attacked the plan for a wholesale overhaul of Israel's judicial system, calling it a "destructive" and "horrible" project designed to turn Israel into a lawless state.

==== Economists and financial experts ====
56 leading US economists, including 11 Nobel Prize laureates, have signed an open letter, stating that "The governing coalition in Israel is considering an array of legislative acts that would weaken the independence of the judiciary and its power to constrain governmental actions. Numerous Israeli economists, in an open letter that some of us joined, expressed concerns that such a reform would adversely affect the Israeli economy by weakening the rule of law and thereby moving Israel in the direction of Hungary and Poland. Although we significantly vary in our views on public policy and on the challenges facing Israeli society, we all share these concerns. A strong and independent judiciary is a critical part of a system of checks and balances. Undermining it would be detrimental not only to democracy but also to economic prosperity and growth."

Former US treasury secretary Lawrence Summers has said that the current Israeli government's effort to limit the powers of the judiciary appears "overly rapid", could raise "serious and profound questions about the rule of law" and "could have quite serious adverse effects on the Israeli economy." Following the abolishment of the reasonableness clause, he wrote: "I mourn today's vote in Israel. It is a reminder of a tragic lesson of history: great nations are brought down more often by internal decay than external threats." He also referred to the 2024 US elections, stating that he "[hopes] Americans will heed this lesson and resist the siren song of populist extremism."

The OECD warned that the erosion of an independent judiciary would likely lead to negative economic consequences and declining investment in Israel.

Nouriel Roubini warned against damage to Israel's economy, democracy and security if the reform is allowed to pass. According to Roubini, "the government's 'reforms' will gradually move Israel closer to becoming an illiberal democracy of the kind one finds in Turkey and Hungary. The long-term damage to the economy could be so severe that, if the governing coalition's judicial coup continues, this vaunted 'start-up nation' could turn into a 'fall-down nation' with severely diminishing economic prospects."

==== Credit rating agencies ====
Moody's Investors Service (Moody's) stated on 7 March 2023 that the planned judicial reforms could have a negative impact on Israel's sovereign credit rating.

On 14 April 2023, Moody's downgraded Israel's credit rating outlook. They explained that the change of outlook "reflects a deterioration of Israel's governance, as illustrated by the recent events around the government's proposal for overhauling the country's judiciary. While mass protests have led the government to pause the legislation and seek dialogue with the opposition, the manner in which the government has attempted to implement a wide-ranging reform without seeking broad consensus points to a weakening of institutional strength and policy predictability." Moody's statement went on to say that, "[W]hile the deliberations about the exact form of the judicial reform continue, the government has reiterated its intention to change how judges are selected. This means that the risk of further political and social tensions within the country remains." In their rationale for changing the outlook, Moody's stated that "[T]he government's plans for an overhaul of the judiciary and the manner in which this reform has been handled have exposed some weakness in Israel's executive and legislative institutions. Compared to many other countries, Israel's institutional set-up relies to an important extent on judicial oversight and review. The country has a unicameral parliament in which the government has a majority, a largely ceremonial role for the president and comparatively weak lower levels of government."

On 25 July Morgan Stanley lowered Israel's credit rating to a "dislike stance", while Moody's warned of a "significant risk that political and social tensions over the issue will continue, with negative consequences for Israel's economy and security situation".

On 27 July, S&P published a report projecting a short-term slowdown in the growth of the Israeli economy, from 6.5% in 2022 to 1.5% in 2023, and warned that the political instability could also "weigh on [the] medium-term economic growth". On 3 August, Citibank published a similar report, projecting a slowdown in economic growth over the medium term from 4.0% to 3.4%.

On 14 August, Fitch reaffirmed Israel's A+ credit rating with a "stable" outlook, noting that "the government's initial judicial overhaul package has been watered down but remains highly controversial and faces strong civil society and political opposition... the changes may have a negative impact on Israel's credit metrics if the weakening of institutional checks leads to worse policy outcomes or sustained negative investor sentiment or weakens governance indicators".

==== Investors ====
Due to the judicial reform plans, American investment bank JPMorgan Chase warned investors of a growing risk of investing in Israel. JPMorgan warned that Israel's credit rating could face negative pressure.

The JPMorgan memo followed a similar warning from HSBC and Goldman Sachs, who wrote in January 2023 that the reforms have "sparked concern among some investors, including locals, that the reforms could reduce judicial independence in Israel, and that — for example, by eventually reducing FDI [foreign direct investment] or tech sector growth in Israel", adding that the judicial reforms could negatively harm the Israeli shekel. These predictions arguably came to fruition on February 21, 2023, when the shekel declined to its weakest level since March 2020, falling more than 2% to a three-year low, and again on March 20, 2023, when the shekel dropped to a four-year low.

==== Researchers and academics ====
Over 140 Israeli and U.S. historians have signed a letter, stating:

- "[The] proposal to politicize the committee that appoints judges will introduce favoritism into the justice system and will call into question the objectivity of judges in all matters.
- The founders of the state of Israel deliberately limited the power of the government. They [...] ensured that the judicial system would be apolitical and independent.
- Israel can be likened to a ship sailing the high seas: the state's institutions are the keel that stabilizes the ship as it moves across stormy waters, while the politicians hold the rudder and tilt its course left or right. The current government is taking out the keel, consciously dismantling the state's institutions.
- What we see causes grave alarm. Since its establishment, there has never been a graver political crisis in Israel that poses such an immediate danger to the very existence of the state."

More than 200 prominent Jewish-American scientists, including several Nobel Prize laureates, have come out against the Netanyahu government's judicial overhaul plan. The scientists stated that their longtime support of Israel required them to "speak up vigorously against incipient changes to Israel's core governmental structure, as put forward by Justice Minister [Yariv] Levin, that will eviscerate Israel's judiciary and impede its critical oversight function." Referring to the planned legislation which would allow the Knesset to override Supreme Court decisions by a very slim majority of 61 votes in the 120-seat parliament, the scientists warned that "Such imbalance and unchecked authority invite corruption and abuse, and stifle the healthy interplay of core state institutions", explaining that "history has shown that this leads to oppression of the defenseless and the abrogation of human rights." They stated that "Pluralism, secular and broad education, protection of rights for women and minorities, and societal stability guaranteed by the rule of law" are "non-negotiable virtues" and their abandonment "would provoke a rift with the international scientific community", increase the risk of boycotts and risk causing a "'brain drain' of [Israel's] best scientists and engineers", expressing concern that "the unprecedented erosion of judiciary independence in Israel will set back the Israeli scientific enterprise for generations to come."

Some 500 Israeli researchers, lecturers and physicians, employed in overseas research and education institutions, signed a petition calling on the Israeli government to stop the legislation.

On 20 July the presidents of the Max Planck Society, Alexander von Humboldt Foundation, Fraunhofer Society, German National Academy of Sciences Leopoldina, Helmholtz Association and German Science and Humanities Council published a joint statement expressing their concerns that "the current judicial reform plans endanger academic freedom and may greatly restrict our joint scientific and innovative potential", and stating their belief that "freedom of research and autonomy of academic institutions are essential for the continued prosperity of societies in Israel, Germany and worldwide". They were later joined by FU Berlin.

According to Professor Erica Frantz, an expert on authoritarianism from Michigan State University, "what's happening in Israel today is similar to what happened in Hungary or Turkey... this is exactly the process used by Erdoğan... to entrench his unlimited power and plummet Turkey into a dictatorship. Once these leaders have the necessary majority to pass the legislation they desire, the door to democratic collapse is open. Israel is now walking that road."

==== Trade union leaders ====
Randi Weingarten, president of the American Federation of Teachers (the largest union in the AFL-CIO labor federation), and Stuart Appelbaum, president of the Retail, Wholesale and Department Store Union and president of the Jewish Labor Committee, have written "We are watching the democracy crisis In Israel with increasing dismay", adding "There are no workers' rights without democracy and no democracy without workers' rights."

==== Newspaper columns and editorials ====
In a New York Times op-ed, conservative columnist Bret Stephens noted Netanyahu's legal complications and "personal interest in bringing the judiciary to heel". He compared him unfavorably to Richard Nixon, stating that "at least there were limits to what the 37th president was willing to do to the system of constitutional government to keep himself in office."

In an article about the planned judicial reforms, Martin Wolf, the chief economics commentator at the Financial Times, wrote that "[T]he reforms are mainly a power grab. They would allow the executive to operate with little judicial accountability and fill the judiciary with [...] loyalists."

The Financial Times stated, in an editorial, that "[E]ssential checks on executive excess are under threat from the government of Benjamin Netanyahu through the planned neutering of judicial powers. [...] The reforms would give the government control over judicial appointments, prevent the High Court [...] from striking down any of the country's quasi-constitutional 'Basic Laws', and limit the court to repealing legislation only if its 15 judges vote unanimously to do so – with a parliamentary override power even in that case with a simple majority. Israel is vulnerable to any weakening of the separation of powers because it has so few checks and balances: it has no written constitution, a president with no veto power, and only one parliamentary chamber, in which the executive almost always holds a majority. This is the context in which a powerful, activist, Supreme Court emerged. It is true that it has sweeping powers, with wide grounds for judicial review of government decisions. Concern about over-reach is legitimate. But curbing it requires considered constitutional reform supported across the political spectrum, not the kind of blatant power grab Netanyahu and his allies are attempting. Giving politicians control over appointments does not depoliticise the bench; it merely pushes the judiciary towards the politics the government of the day favours — in this case, an alarmingly nationalist, religious and hardline one."

New York Times columnist Thomas Friedman asked "what Israeli leader would risk a civil war at home, a breach with Jewish democrats across the world, a break with America and significant damage to Israel's high-tech miracle — and now open talk by Israeli troops that they will not die to protect a dictatorship... Netanyahu would risk all that only for something very big, very important and very personal. And that is a judicial "reform" that he hopes would end his trial on breach of trust, bribery and fraud charges, which could land him in prison. The judicial 'reform' would also give his right-wing coalition the unfettered power to build any settlements in any place, to seize any Palestinian land and to pour tax dollars into Orthodox religious schools where young people have only to study the Torah, not math, science or literature — let alone serve in the army."

Writing on the abolishment of the reasonableness clause, conservative Washington Post columnist Max Boot states that "Israel now stands to lose one of its few checks on majoritarian tyranny". On the Netanyahu's overall impact on the state, he writes that "Israel's No. 1 security threat comes from its Trump-like prime minister: Benjamin Netanyahu."

==== Other ====
The discussion of the judicial reform coincides with a growing discussion on the withdrawal of US military aid to Israel, totaling $3.8 billion a year in 2023. Among the voices calling for reduction or elimination of the aid are US Senators Bernie Sanders and Chris Van Hollen, former ambassador Dan Kurtzer, New York Times commentator Nicholas Kristof, Washington Post commentator Max Boot, Washington Examiner commentator Tom Rogan, and others.

=== Neutral reactions ===
On 8 August, billionaire Arthur Dantchik announced he would cease his support for the Kohelet Policy Forum, stating that "when a society becomes dangerously fragmented, people must come together to preserve democracy... I believe what is most critical at this time is for Israel to focus on healing and national unity". Dantchik, a known donor to conservative causes, has been the target of frequent protests in front of his Philadelphia home and office since March.

==== Jewish organizations ====
===== North America =====
====== Orthodox Union ======
Rabbi Moshe Hauer, Executive Vice President of the Orthodox Union, said that the OU believed that "there should be a dialogue within Israel" regarding the planned judicial reform. He also said that "our way is not through public declarations, but quiet conversations."

=== Reactions supporting the changes ===
==== Members of the legal profession ====
American legal scholars Richard Epstein (Advisory Board Chairman of the Israeli Law & Liberty Forum, a sister organization of the US Federalist Society) and Max Raskin co-authored an op-ed in The Wall Street Journal in support of the reforms and their economic impact. They wrote that "Israel's Supreme Court ... is the branch of government that actually holds unchecked political power" and contrast the situation in the US, where the Supreme Court of the United States has the "power to strike down laws, but [is] guided by a written constitution" with the situation in Israel, where (in the absence of a Constitution) Supreme Court judges "are guided by their own judgments and the quasi-constitutional 'Basic Laws', which the Israeli Supreme Court itself can strike down." They unfavorably compare Israel's Judicial Selection Committee to the way in which Supreme Court judges are chosen in the US. Epstein and Raskin argue that the reforms will not have a negative impact on Israel's economy or credit rating as they "will bring Israel's judicial systems more in line with Western norms."

== See also ==
- Thirty-seventh government of Israel
