= Israeli Law Professors' Forum for Democracy =

Voluntary group of law professors in Israel advocating for democracy

- פורום המרצים למשפטים למען הדמוקרטיה
- Formation: 2023; 3 years ago
- Founder: Ittai Bar-Siman-Tov, Eliav Lieblich, Ronit Levine-Schnur
- Founded at: Israel
- Purpose: Advocate for democracy and judicial independence
- Affiliations: Basha'ar

The Israeli Law Professors' Forum for Democracy is a voluntary, non-affiliated and independent group of about 140 permanent faculty members in the law faculties of academic institutions in Israel. The Forum was founded in 2023, in response to the 2023 Israeli judicial reform. The Forum opposes this plan, and advocates the maintenance of a robust separation of powers with sustainable checks and balances.

The Forum actively opposes initiatives and actions aimed at abolishing the independence of the judiciary and subordinating it to the government and to partisan political considerations of the executive branch, as well as initiatives aimed at limiting democratic institutions, equal and free elections, the right to equality, freedom of speech, freedom of religion, and other human rights.

The main activity of the forum is authoring and publishing professional legal opinions, based on extensive legal research. By the summer 2023, the Forum had published over 50 position papers on various issues, such as the unreasonableness amendment, judicial independence, judicial appointments, and more. Extracts of the papers are published in Arabic, English, French, and Russian.

The Forum is assisted by "Basha'ar", an organization of senior Israeli academics, for administrative and financial support, while maintaining full independence.

== Composition ==
The Forum grew out of a discussion group established by several law professors (among them Professor Ittai Bar-Siman-Tov and Professor Eliav Lieblich) in 2019, in response to legislative initiatives related to enacting a constitutional override clause in Israel. The joint activity of the members of the Forum expanded and became partially institutionalized in view of the legal reform presented by the coalition in the 25th Knesset at the beginning of 2023.

The Forum comprises about 140 law professors and lecturers who are permanent faculty members in all law faculties in Israel, including most of constitutional law and administrative law experts in Israel. The Forum was founded and is led by Dr. Ronit Levine-Schnur from Reichman University.

Members of the Forum include, among others, Prof. Yaniv Roznai and Prof. Adam Shinar (Reichman University), Prof. Margit Cohn, Prof. Eyal Benvenisti, Prof. David Kretzmer, Prof. Guy Davidov and Prof. Barak Medina (Hebrew University); Prof. Menachem Mautner, Prof. Ronen Avraham, Prof. Yishai Blank, Dr. Ofra Bloch, Prof. Dafna Hacker, Prof. Aeyal Gross, Dr. Doreen Lustig and Dr. Yofi Tirosh (Tel Aviv University); Dr. Meital Pinto (Zefat Academic College and the Ono Academic College), Dr. Ori Aronson, Prof. Ittai Bar-Siman-Tov and Dr. Manal Totri-Jubran (Bar-Ilan University); Prof. Tamar Hostovsky Brands, Prof. Zvi Kahana and Prof. Dana Pugach (Ono Academic College); Prof. Amnon Reichman and Dr. Yair Sagy (Haifa University); Prof. Yiffat Bitton (Ahva Academic College), Dr. Nurit Zimmerman (Sapir Academic College), and Prof. Gila Stopler (Academic Center for Law and Business).

The Forum considers the legislative initiatives proposed by the coalition to be an unprecedented and serious attack on the independence of the judiciary, state legal advisors, the police, the military, public broadcasting, and the academia - intended to seriously curve the rule of law and the democratic nature of the State of Israel. The Forum holds that the weakening of the checks and balances mechanisms in Israel will enable the current governing coalition to entrench its power for many years to come, possibly rendering irreversible the changes currently promoted.

== Forum positions ==
=== Levin reform ===
The Forum argues that the aggregated changes proposed by Israel's thirty-seventh government suffocate the independence of the judiciary, dissolve the separation of powers among the branches of governments, and undermine the rule of law. The Forum emphasizes that there is not a single democratic country in the world where a combination of all the proposed constitutional arrangements exists.

==== Mechanism for selecting judges ====
The Forum strongly opposes the proposal that the coalition alone will be able to appoint judges, on the grounds that judges appointed by the government alone will have difficulty fulfilling its role in the democratic regime as a control mechanism of the actions of the executive branch. The Forum is similarly opposed to the selection of judges by the votes of politicians only. The Forum points to numerous empirical and comparative studies that indicate a correlation between a greater involvement of political actors and lesser involvement of professional representatives in the process of selecting judges on the one hand, and political influence on the judgments on the other hand.

==== Diversity of court system ====
One argument that the proponents of the Levin The Forum points out that in recent decades, under the existing system, the committee for the selection of judges has successfully appointed judges from different groups within the Israeli population. The Forum supports increasing diversity in the judicial system, but claims that the coalition's proposal will lead to the appointment of ideologically biased judges, chosen only because of their political loyalty.

==== Status of Attorney General and legal advisors ====
The Forum maintains that the coalition's proposal, according to which the legal opinion of the Attorney General or of ministerial legal advisors will not bind the political echelon, will allow the political echelon to carry out illegal acts without any internal review. According to the Forum this will expose government ministries to pressure by interest groups whose influence will not be blocked by the professional gate-keepers, thus weakening the public's trust in the system which is now non-partisan and professional.

==== Abolition of reasonableness as grounds for judicial review ====
The Forum vehemently opposed the 24 July 2023 legislation amending Basic Law: Judiciary, which denies the courts the power to consider and/or pass judgment on the reasonableness of any decision of the Cabinet, the prime minister, or any government minister. The Forum opined that "[t]he unreasonableness amendment is only the first step towards executive authoritarianism, stripping an entire body of case-law that served as a primary constraint on executive arbitrariness, illegality, and corruption". The Forum also addresses the government's policy towards Palestinians in the occupied West Bank, warning that the amendment could even further weaken "the highly limited legal protections they have enjoyed until now.."

According to the Forum, legislation to develop Israeli administrative law (which is currently judge-made) should consist of norms that apply to the administration rather than those that limits of the courts' authority. Such legislation should be adopted without regard to the narrow interests of any specific government. Therefore, the applicability of such a law should either be postponed until the term of office of the next Knesset, or the law should be enacted by an especially large majority.

=== Comparative analysis of constitutional arrangements ===
The Forum opposes the coalition's approach, which argues that the existence of certain constitutional arrangements aboard justifies their adoption in Israel. The Forum argues that this is done without regard for the full context of the constitutional arrangements in those countries which create a comprehensive structure of checks and balances. Some of the mechanisms that are found abroad but do not exist in Israel are a comprehensive and rigid constitution, a bi-cameral parliament, a presidential system of government, a federal structure, regional elections, or the subordination of national legislation to supra-national courts that protect human rights and basic democratic principles. The Forum argues that selective borrowing of arrangements that strengthen the government's power in foreign countries without the mechanisms that balance them will create a flawed legal structure in Israel. Such structure will place it alongside countries that have experienced acute democratic backsliding in recent years, such as Turkey, Hungary and Poland. Some of the forum positions are based on the opinions of experts from the countries whose constitutional arrangements the coalition purports to import to Israel, including Great Britain and Switzerland.

The Forum refuted the coalition's claim that there is no judicial review of laws in New Zealand by pointing to the powers of the courts there to strike down laws. It also pointed out that, contrary to what is claimed by coalition supporters, Ireland, has adopted a scheme for electing judges that is free from any political affiliation. The Forum has shown that in France elected officials do not control the appointment of the majority of judges. The Forum also noted that in the United States there are actually a variety of election methods, and even when the appointment is made by the president, other factors are involved in the process, factors that act as brakes on the power of the government. Regarding the appointment of presidents of high courts according to the rule of seniority in democratic countries, the Forum points out that in the United States a rule of seniority is enshrined in all regular federal courts, except for the Supreme Court. This is also the case with regard to the appointment of Supreme Court presidents in several US states. The Forum also hold that the rule of seniority is of great importance in appointment procedures in many democratic countries, especially since other methods, including in the United States, the appointment of a Supreme Court president by Politicians is not common.

The Forum states that the proposed measures are completely contrary to the recommendations of the Venice Commission of the Council of Europe, of which Israel is a member, in at least three aspects: the methods of selecting judges, the procedure for making constitutional changes, and respecting the principles of the rule of law. According to the Forum, if the proposals are passed, Israel's weak checks and balances system will be similar to that of countries such as Poland, Hungary and Turkey. The legal systems of those three countries have been very negatively reviewed in recent years by the Venice Commission.

=== Position on possible consequences of the proposed regime changes ===
Women: The Forum claims that the actions, commitments and legislative changes proposed by the coalition will restrict women's rights in Israel in a severe way. The Forum points out to problematic legislative changes, some of which are already in process and some of which are planned, for example the exacerbation of gender segregation in public sphere.

Children: The Forum emphasizes the judiciary's importance in the interpretation of law and in the protection of the rights of children. Weakening the court system may be particularly harmful to minors belonging to minority groups, including children without status, LGBTQ+ children, and children of LGBTQ+ parents. According to the Forum, the abolition of the reasonableness doctrine will especially endanger minors in risky situations. Politicization of the selection of judges may, according to the forum, result in unprofessional appointments as juvenile and family court judges. Expanding the powers of the Rabbinical Court system may, in the Forum's opinion, harm the rights that minors currently have in divorce proceedings.

Palestinians: The Forum notes that the transfer of the responsibility and management of the West Bank to civilian hands according to the power sharing agreement between the current Minister of Defense and the additional minister in the Ministry of Defense dated February 23, 2023 is an explicit and public surrender of the management of the West Bank to national and social considerations of the state, which is in contravention of international law. According to the Forum, the agreement is an open and official step that gives validity to the claims that Israel uses the practice of apartheid, which is prohibited under public international law.

Employees: The Forum maintains that the dependence of judges on politicians will harm the ability of the labor courts to deal with labor disputes, with requests for injunctions against strikes, and more. This will harm collective labor laws (such as freedom of association and collective bargaining, settlement of labor disputes and the right to strike) and individual labor laws, including constitutional rights at work, and the employees' pension funds. The members of the Forum claim that the changes in the legislation will especially harm the weaker sections of Israeli society.

LGBTQ+ people: According to the Forum, the cancellation of effective judicial review will cause harm to LGBTQ+ families. Hindering the independence of the courts will have a particularly serious effect on women's rights and the rights of the trans community, since their rights in essential areas have been recognized and protected by the courts, rather than by the Legislature. According to the Forum, limiting the activities of human rights organizations will harm the extremely important fight for equal rights for LGBTQ+ people.

Litigants in the rabbinical courts: The Forum argues that since the rabbinical courts suffer from many of the ills of governance that the coalition's proposals ostensibly seek to correct, they should have been at the center of the plan to improve judicial procedures in Israel. According to the Forum, the coalition's effort to expand the jurisdiction of the rabbinic courts raises doubts about the sincerity of its alleged intention to correct supposed problems of the secular legal system.

Criminal defendants and victims: The Forum claims that the abolition of reasonableness doctrine as grounds for review and the lack of an explicit anchoring of the constitutional right to equality may expose weak populations such as prisoners, suspects, crime victims and others to serious harm without any restraint. Risks include the establishment new offenses or increasing punishment in a way that particularly harms disadvantaged populations, and legislation that will allow abusive policing and enforcement and draconian punishment. The Forum points out that in populist states criminal law is misused to impose restrictions on civil society organizations, restrict freedom of expression, and create an infrastructure that encourages corruption.

Academia: The Forum estimates that the existing threats to academic freedom in Israel will intensify if the proposed changes are approved. It warns that academic freedom will be harmed, and with it the quality of research and teaching.

The Forum has published position papers on the consequences of the regime changes in additional areas, including the environment, and the right to privacy.

=== The Forum's academic analysis of possible modes of action of different actors ===
The public service during a constitutional crisis: The Forum believes that during a constitutional crisis, namely when two different branches of the government compete over the authority to determine fundamental governmental arrangements, the decision of civil servants to obey one of the competing branches of government should be based on two considerations: the identification of the authority authorized to determine the law, and the obligation to provide equal and optimal service to the population. Given the characteristics of the 37th government's actions in the constitutional field, the Forum believes that civil servants must obey the instructions of the Attorney-General to the government and the Supreme Court in cases where its rulings concern their actions, but this determination may change as the existing conditions change, chiefly the independence of the Attorney-General and the Supreme Court.

Strike: A work stoppage caused by opposition to the moves promoted by the government in its governmental capacity and not as an employer, is a political strike that is not recognized as a "strike" under Israeli law. However, in some cases, a work stoppage may be recognized as a strike and even provide protections to the strikers, for example if it is directed against legislative changes that directly affect working conditions and labor relations.

=== Positions regarding so-called compromise outlines ===
The Forum criticized the manner in which talks were conducted under the auspice of the President, given that, in the Forum's opinion, they are conducted confidentially and without transparency, without sufficient representation, and in a way that threatens the legislation and constitution that will shape Israeli democracy.[28]

The President's outline: At the end of February 2023, representatives of the Forum had a one-off meeting with President Herzog. At this meeting, they requested that representatives of Arab society take part in the negotiations, and presented red lines regarding the proposed changes. They emphasized that the coalition's control of the committee for the selection of judges should be prevented, that there is a need to enact a Basic Law on legislation, and that it is necessary to anchor the protection of human rights. Journalist Yehuda Yifarah claimed that the Forum, presented an "extreme letter" to the President, with the result that the president adopted an outline that the government cannot accept.

Friedmann-Elbashan outline: The Forum argued that the compromise plan proposed by former justice minister Daniel Friedmann and others adopts too much of the government's plan to be regarded as a "compromise".

=== Means and tools for building constitutional changes ===
The Forum has put forward its position regarding a proper procedures for the enactment of constitutional reform. It maintained that circumscribing judicial review justifies the empowerment of the Knesset (rather than of the government as proposed by the coalition), and that any decision on the matter should be adopted by an especially large parliamentary majority, which includes opposition members. With regard to provisional arrangements pending the adoption of a comprehensive constitution on the basis of the existing basic laws and in accordance with the spirit of the Israeli Declaration of Independence, the Forum sets out minimum requirements. These include:

- The committee for selecting judges should include members of the court system, the government, the Knesset and the public. Women and the Arab public must be represented on the committee. A basic law: Legislation must be enacted and this law should set procedural and substantive limitations, in the spirit of the fundamental principles of the Israeli Declaration of Independence, on the enactment and amendment of basic laws.
- The authority of the courts to conduct judicial review of legislation in light of the basic laws must be anchored.
- The right to equality must be anchored in Israel's Basic Law: Human Dignity and Liberty and a committee should be established to promote the enactment of a basic laws dealing with human and social rights.
- Collective rights for the Arab public must be anchored in a Basic Law.
- The independence of the ombudsmen and the binding status of it opinions must be enshrined in a basic law.

=== Gaza-war ===
Since 7 October 2023, Israeli international law experts, including members of the Israeli Law Professors’ Forum for Democracy (ILPFD), have authored numerous legal statements concerning Israel’s conduct of war. These documents analyze the actions of both Hamas and the Israeli government from the perspective of international humanitarian law. The texts are addressed to, among others, the Attorney General, the Military Advocate General, the Minister of Defence, the Supreme Court of Israel, and media representatives. Some of the statements have been made public, while others were initially treated confidentially. The only officially published statement to date is from 10 July 2025 and concerns the proposal to establish a “Humanitarian City” in the south of the Gaza Strip. Verfassungsblog has compiled a total of 18 of these statements and published them in English translation.

== Public activity ==
=== Activity in the Knesset ===
Forum members participated in the Knesset Constitution, Law and Justice Committee discussions that dealt with the proposed regime changes. Position documents of the forum were used as background material for the discussions and the members of the forum expressed themselves during the discussions.

=== Public addresses ===
Members of the Forum regularly speak on behalf of the forum in the weekly demonstrations around the country. Dr. Ronit Levine-Schnur spoke in the central demonstration in Tel Aviv, Prof. Yaniv Roznai spoke in the major demonstration in Jerusalem against the legislation annulling reasonableness as grounds for judicial review. Other members have been speaking regularly since the beginning of the protests.

=== Public outreach ===
The Forum has held various symposia featuring academics, members of the Knesset, members of civil society organizations and members of policy institutes.

== See also ==
- Reactions to the 2023 Israeli judicial reform
- Democratic backsliding
- Illiberal democracy
