= Maytal Gilboa =

Israeli jurist

- מיטל גלבוע
- Born: 1978 (age 47–48); Ramat Gan
- Citizenship: Israel
- Education: Tel Aviv University
- Scientific career
- Fields: Tort, restitution and unjust enrichment, legal remedy and private law
- Workplaces: Bar-Ilan University, University of Western Ontario

Maytal Gilboa (born 1978) is an Israeli legal scholar and researcher, specializing in tort law, unjust enrichment, remedies, and theories of private law. She has been serving as an associate professor at the Faculty of Law of the University of Western Ontario in Canada since 2025, and was previously a senior lecturer at Bar-Ilan University (2020–2024).

== Biography ==
Gilboa was born in Ramat Gan in 1978.

She completed her LL.B. in law and B.A. in management at Tel Aviv University in 2004. In 2013, she completed her LL.M. there as part of a direct-track PhD program, which she completed in 2016 under the supervision of Ariel Porat. Her doctoral dissertation focused on legal causation and unjust enrichment.

Between 2015–2016, she served as a teaching fellow at the Buchmann Faculty of Law. She subsequently continued as a postdoctoral research fellow at the Center for the Study of Rationality at the Hebrew University of Jerusalem (2016–2017) and at the Faculty of Law of the University of Toronto.

In 2020, she joined the Faculty of Law at Bar-Ilan University as a lecturer, and was promoted to associate professor in 2024. In January 2025, she joined the Faculty of Law at the University of Western Ontario in the same position.

Gilboa is a member of the Israeli Law Professors' Forum for Democracy.

She has been awarded grants from the Israel Science Foundation, the German-Israeli Foundation for Scientific Research and Development, and a Presidential Scholarship from Tel Aviv University.

== Personal life ==
Gilboa is married to Yigal Blum, a software engineer, and they have two children.

== Publications ==
- Maytal Gilboa; Tamar Kricheli Katz (2025). "Biased Evaluation of Pain and Suffering Damages". Journal of Law & Empirical Analysis. 2: 237–250. doi:10.1177/2755323X251362525.
- Maytal Gilboa (2025). "Substitute Victims". Boston College Law Review. 66: 797–855. doi:10.70167/xrro4825.
- Maytal Gilboa; Yotam Kaplan; Roee Sarel (2024). "Climate Change as Unjust Enrichment" (PDF). Georgetown Law Journal: 1039–1094.
- Maytal Gilboa (2022). "Biased but Reasonable: Bias Under the Cover of Standard of Care". SSRN Electronic Journal. doi:10.2139/ssrn.4186764.
- Maytal Gilboa (2022). "Linking Gains to Wrongs". SSRN Electronic Journal. doi:10.2139/ssrn.4071534.
- Maytal Gilboa (2019). "Multiple reasonable behaviors cases: The problem of causal underdetermination in tort law". Legal Theory. 25: 77–104. doi:10.1017/s135232521900003x.
- Maytal Gilboa; Yotam Kaplan (2021). "The Costs of Mistakes". SSRN Electronic Journal. doi:10.2139/ssrn.3951197. JSTOR 27136468.
- Maytal Gilboa (2022). "The Color of Pain: Racial Bias in Pain and Suffering Damages". Georgia Law Review. 56.
