= Guy Davidov =

Israeli law scholar (born 1970)

Professor Guy Davidov
- גיא דוידוב
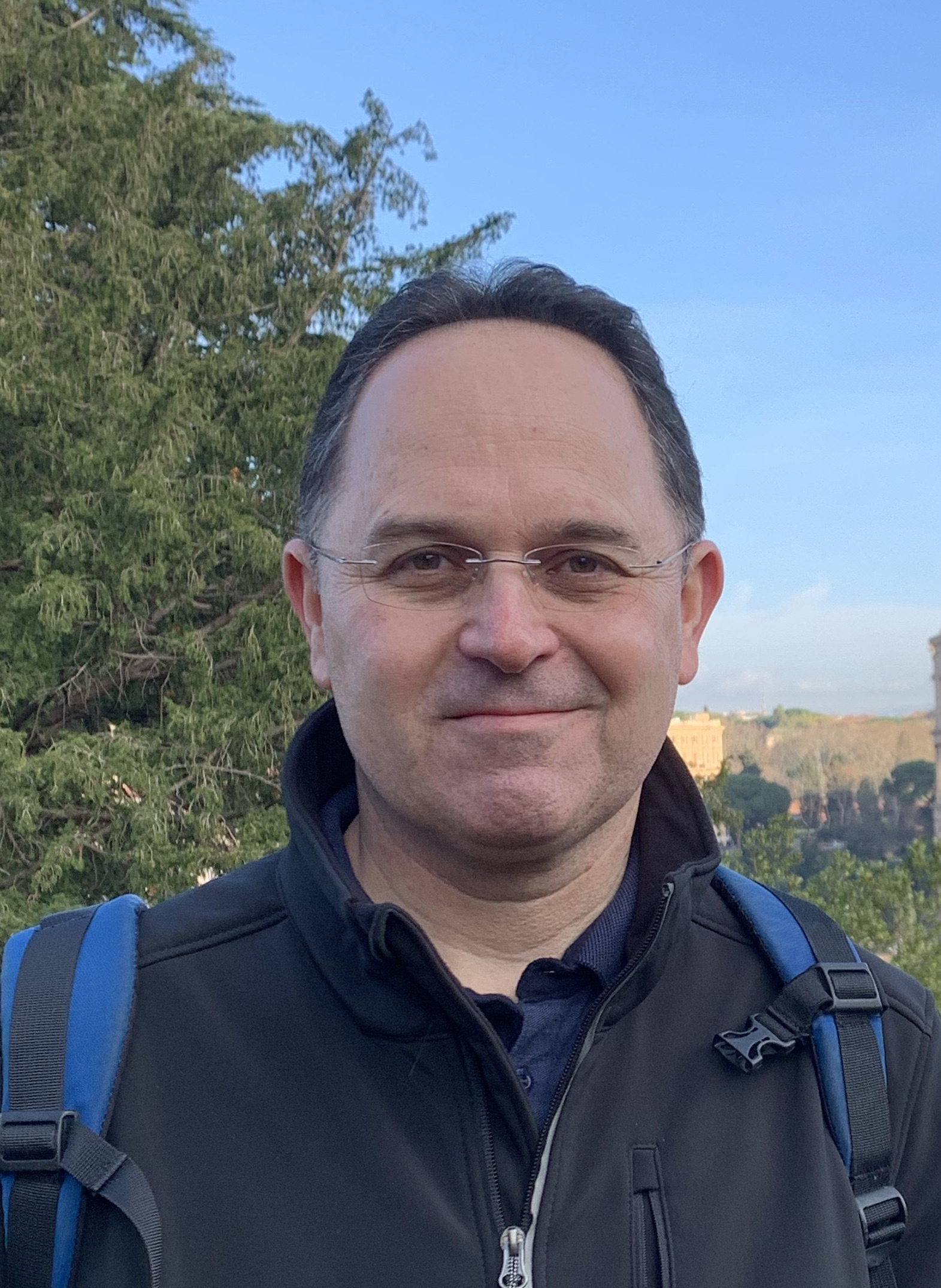
- Born: 1970 (age 55–56); Israel
- Occupation: law professor

Academic background
- Education: Tel Aviv University, University of Toronto

Academic work
- Discipline: law
- Sub-discipline: labour law
- Institutions: Hebrew University in Jerusalem
- Website: guydavidov.net

Guy Davidov (Hebrew: גיא דוידוב; born 1970) is a professor at BI Norwegian Business School, Department of Law and Governance, and the Elias Lieberman Professor of Labour Law at the Hebrew University of Jerusalem.

Davidov completed his LLB studies at Tel-Aviv University, and his LLM and SJD degrees at the University of Toronto. From 2002 he was a faculty member at the University of Haifa, before moving to the Hebrew University of Jerusalem in 2007, and assuming the Elias Lieberman Chair in Labour Law in 2009. In 2015 he became full professor.

Davidov was the founder and first Chair (2011-2015) of the Labour Law Research Network (LLRN). He was also the Editor-in-Chief of the International Journal of Comparative Labour Law and Industrial Relations (2015-2020).

Davidov is a member of the Israeli Law Professors' Forum for Democracy, established in 2023 to respond to the Israeli coalition's plans for changes in the legal system.

== Scholarly work ==
In his book A Purposive Approach to Labour Law (OUP, 2016) Davidov argues that the mismatch between goals and means is a major cause of crisis in labour law, and adopts a purposive approach to interpretation and legislative reform, to address this crisis. Davidov offers solutions at the level of both judicial interpretation and legislation. The book offers several examples of implementing a purposive analysis. It also recommends institutional structures that are suited to ongoing adaptation of the law to changing circumstances. Finally, Davidov makes several proposals to improve compliance and enforcement.

Davidov’s work has been cited with approval by the Supreme Courts of the UK, Canada, and Israel.

== Main publications ==
=== Books ===
- Guy Davidov and Brian Langille (eds), Boundaries and Frontiers of Labour Law (Hart Publishing, 2006)
- Guy Davidov and Brian Langille (eds), The Idea of Labour Law (Oxford University Press, 2011)
- Guy Davidov, A Purposive Approach to Labour Law (Oxford University Press, 2016)

=== Selected articles ===
- Guy Davidov, "Non-waivability in Labour Law", 40 Oxford Journal of Legal Studies 482 (2020)
- Guy Davidov, "Indirect Employment: Should Lead Companies Be Liable?", 37 Comparative Labor Law and Policy Journal 5 (2015)
- Guy Davidov, "Setting Labour Law's Coverage: Between Universalism and Selectivity" 34 Oxford Journal of Legal Studies 543 (2014)
- Guy Davidov, "The Goals of Regulating Work: Between Universalism and Selecvtivity" 64 University of Toronto Law Journal 1 (2014)
- Guy Davidov, “The Three Axes of Employment Relationships: A Characterization of Workers in Need of Protection” (2002) 52 University of Toronto Law Journal 357
