= Yifat Bitton =

Israeli law professor, politician

- יפעת ביטון
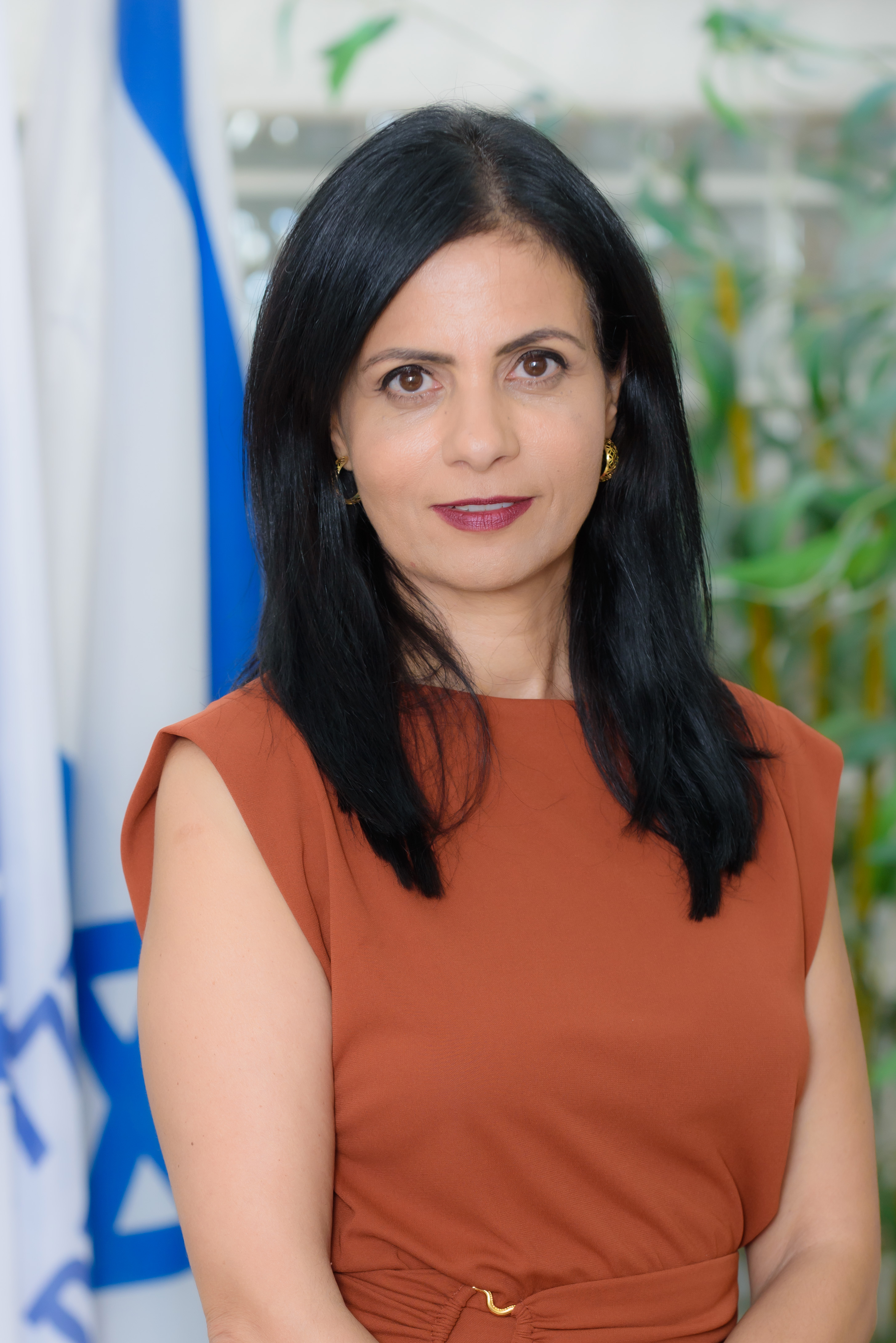
- Born: 1971; Kiryat Malachi
- Spouse: Eyal Sternberg
- Children: 2

Academic background
- Education: Harvard Law School; Hebrew University of Jerusalem; Yale Law School
- Thesis: Re-reading Tort Law from an Egalitarian Perspective

Yifat Bitton (Hebrew: יפעת ביטון) is an Israeli law professor, and activist. She is the president of the Achva Academic College of education & science. She is the founder of Tmura—The Israeli Anti-discrimination Center, which advocates for the rights of women who have suffered abuse. She was shortlisted for Israel's Supreme Court twice. In February 2019, Bitton entered politics, and joined Ehud Barak in the formation of a new political party.

== Career ==
From 1996 to 1997 Bitton clerked for Israeli Supreme Court Justice Mishael Cheshin. In 2006, Bitton founded Tmura—The Israeli Anti-discrimination Center, which advocates for women who have experienced sexual violence and violation of their economic rights. She is a civil rights activist, focusing on equality for the Mizrahi population.

Bitton was on the list of candidates for Israel's Supreme Court in 2017 and 2018, the youngest woman to ever appear on the list. She currently serves as the President of Achva academic college of education & science and in the past served as an associate professor at Israel's College of Management Academic Studies Law School. Prof. Bitton taught for 5 years as an Affiliated Transnational Visiting professor at Peking University School of Transnational Law. She was also a visiting professor at New York University.

Following the October 7th attacks, Bitton was one of key figures in "The Civil Commission on October 7 Crimes by Hamas against Women and Children", a group dedicated to expose and document sexual crimes during those attacks. The group aimed to recognize the sexual and gender-based violence in the 7 October by international organizations and defining them as Crimes against humanity Her activity led her to a meeting with President of the United States Joe Biden, during his visit to Israel. She participated as a keynote speaker at the United Nations, in a special session called "Hear Our Voices: Sexual and gender-based violence in the October 7th Hamas terror attack".

In 2024 Bitton led the research to uncover additional indicators of Hamas sexual crimes, in a 100-page report called "Challenges in Identifying and Documenting Sexual Crimes Committed During A Terrorist Attack". Her report not only details additional evidence and testimonies of such acts, but also shed a light on the failures of Israel's' First and secondary responders to identify and document them as part of their investigations on the field. In January 2025 she had presented the report to diplomats and senior officials at the UN.

== Politics ==
In February 2019, Bitton joined the Gesher party led by Orly Levy, receiving the third spot on the list. In the April 2019 Israeli legislative election, Gesher did not make it into the Knesset. Bitton joined Ehud Barak at a press conference in June 2019 announcing the formation of a new political party to challenge Benjamin Netanyahu in the September elections. The new party, Israel Democratic Party, joined other parties to create the Democratic Union list, with Bitton being placed seventh on the joint list.

Bitton is a member of the Israeli Law Professors' Forum for Democracy, established in 2023 to respond to the Israeli coalition's plans for changes in the legal system.

== Education ==
Bitton spent the 2004–2005 academic year at Harvard Law. Bitton holds a PhD as well as an LLB and LLM from The Hebrew University of Jerusalem and a Master of Laws degree from Yale Law School.

== Personal life ==
Bitton was born in Kiryat Malachi and lives in Herzliya. She is married to Eyal Sternberg, a lawyer, and they have two children.

== Awards ==
Bitton has won The Aliance Prize for Education and Social Change; The Minister of Social Equality and President's Award for Organizations Fighting Violence against Women (Tmura); "Honoris Causa" Award of the Israeli Bar Association; The Safra Award for Excellence and Contribution to Israeli Society; The Hadassah Foundation Bernice Tennenbaum Prize for innovative feminist; The Human Rights Activist Award of The London Human Rights Annual Dinner and Dafna Izraeli Fund's Prize for Israeli Feminist Leadership. In 2025 she was one of 24 recipients of "The Israeli Society Heroes Award", on behalf of the World Zionist Organization, for her research on Hamas's war crimes.

Bitton was also Nominated Forbes' 50 Most Influential Women in Israel.
