= Roni Strier =

Israeli-Argentine social work researcher

- רוני סטרייר
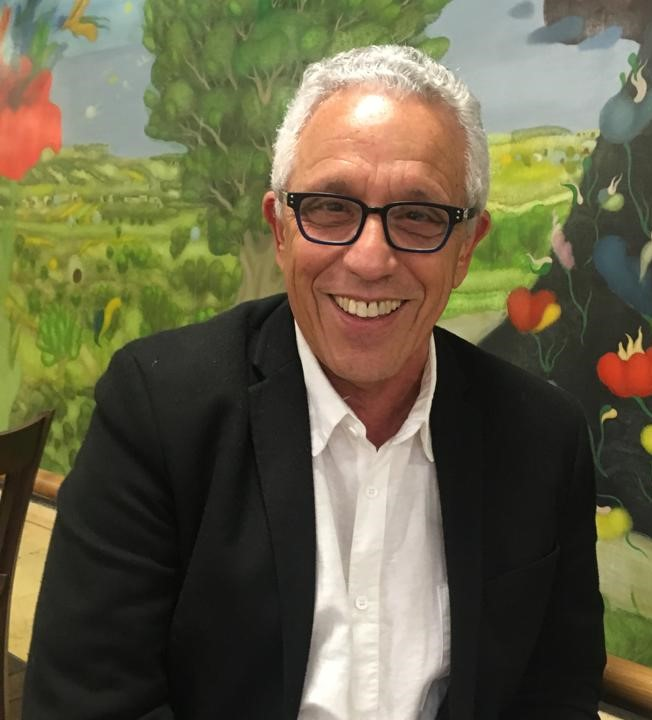
- Born: 13 December 1952 (age 73); Lanús, Argentina
- Occupation: University Professor
- Known for: Social Work researcher, Educator, Social Activist

Roni Strier (Hebrew: רוני סטרייר; born December 13, 1952, in Argentina) is a social work researcher, educator, and activist. He is an associate professor at the University of Haifa School of Social Work, founder and head of the Interdisciplinary Center for the Study of Poverty and Social Exclusion.

== Biography ==
Strier was born in Lanús, Buenos Aires Province, Argentina. He moved to Israel in 1971 at the age of 18, after graduating from high school. He studied at a preparatory program for new immigrants at the University of Haifa. He completed a B.A. and an M.A. degrees in sociology and anthropology at the sociology and anthropology department, Hebrew University of Jerusalem and a Ph.D. in social work at the School of Social Work and Social Policy at the Hebrew University of Jerusalem. His doctorate, supervised by Rivka Bar-Yosef and Avraham Doron, was a comparative study on the perceptions of poverty of clients and social workers in the public welfare services of Jerusalem. Strier completed a post-doctorate at the University of Pennsylvania Graduate School of Education at the National Center on Fathers and Families (NCOFF). He has held various executive positions in the fields of education, community and welfare.

== Public activities ==
Strier has held numerous professional, academic and public service positions. In 1972, a year after immigrating to Israel, he served as a centralizer of new immigrant students through Hillel International and the University of Haifa Dean of Students. He was also active in the "Yesh" movement, a Jewish-Arab student movement elected for the University of Haifa Students' union. In 1973, he continued his studies at the Hebrew University of Jerusalem, joining the student commune "Beit HaBonim" in the Katamon 9 neighborhood. Members of the commune were active in working with children and in helping community residents organize a Mizrahi community movement called “Aholaim”. After serving as the commune's coordinator, Strier was named the Director of the University of Haifa's Dean of Students Social Engagement Unit. There he worked to establish other student communes in distressed communities in Jerusalem. At the same time, he was among the founders of "CAMPUS" (Hebrew acronym for "Student Group for Political Involvement"), an organization of Jewish and Arab students that was active on the University's campus for many years.

Strier was a graduate of the first class of "Chofen" Institute (Hebrew acronym for "Open Experimental Education Institute") at the Ministry of Education, which, under the leadership of the late Professor Moshe Caspi, sought to advance open and democratic education in Israel. After completing his studies at the Institute, he served as the principal of the "Lifta" open high school in Jerusalem, one of the first open democratic schools in Israel. Following this, he held numerous positions in the fields of social welfare, including management positions in neighborhood rehabilitation programs, the Israel Association of Community Centers, and others. As the Deputy Director of the New Israel Fund, Strier assisted in building the Fund's infrastructure for fundraising and support of civil society organizations, including the Association for Civil Rights in Israel, Neve Shalom, aid centers for survivors of sexual assault, Adva Center and various peace organizations. He also co-founded “In the Spirit of Freedom,” a civil and human rights Film festival, with the Jerusalem Cinematheque.

Strier directed MASHOV (Hebrew acronym for "Engagement, Partnership, and Advocacy in the Community") (and "Meuravut" (Engagement), two non-profit organizations working to advance the development of social services and social rights of families living in poverty and exclusion in Israel. These organizations, in partnership with the Jerusalem Municipality, the Ministry of Labor, Social Affairs and Social Services, and the Social Services Fund at the Bituah Leumi (National Insurance Institute), initiated and developed "Mercazei Otzma" (Centers for Assistance for Families). These innovative centers seek to assist families living in poverty through the principles of involvement, partnership and advancing social rights. Today there are 120 such centers in Israel, funded by the Ministry of Welfare.

In 2005, Strier joined the University of Haifa's School of Social Work, where he teaches community work, critical approaches in social work, poverty and exclusion, and research on fatherhood. He was a partner in the establishment of the Israel Forum for the Struggle against Poverty, led by Professor Yona Rosenfeld. Strier is a member of the Forum's leadership team, advancing public engagement activities, education and lobbying with and on behalf of people living in poverty. He serves as a senior consultant for various government offices in developing models for addressing issues of poverty and exclusion.

== Academic activities ==
- Teaching: Strier's fields of teaching include poverty, social exclusion, social work with excluded communities, critical and anti-oppressive social work, critical theories, and fatherhood.
- Research: Principle research area is poverty and social exclusion. Within this field, Strier has initiated various studies on the working poor in Israel, poverty and gender, poverty and nationality, social services in mixed cities in Israel, the influence of neo-liberalism on civil society organizations, the influence of neo-liberalism on public welfare services, introducing critical approaches in public welfare services, social work education, developing knowledge of poverty in welfare services, and various studies related to welfare issues. He has also investigated the relationships between Academy and poor, and excluded communities.

== Academy-community activities ==
=== Haifa Partnership Program for Poverty Eradication ===
In 2005, Strier co-founded this initiative, together with the University of Haifa's School of Social Work, and the city of Haifa's Department of Welfare and Community Services. The program is based on the principle of partnership between academia and public welfare services, with and on behalf of people living in poverty. Active for over 13 years, this unique program assigns social work students, social works, and activists from distressed communities in Haifa side by side, in order to advance community projects, educational programs, and legislation to advance social justice and decrease poverty. As part of the program, community activist groups work to increase public awareness on the issue of poverty. The program has also convened national and international conferences on the subject of poverty.

=== University of Haifa's Flagship Program for the Struggle against Exclusion and Advancement of Solidarity ===
In 2011, Strier founded this program, and served as its academic supervisor until 2019. This university-wide initiative aims to promote academic involvement in the struggle for an inclusive and solidarity society in Israel.

The Council for Higher Education in Israel, through the Planning and Budget Committee, funds the program. It consists of courses in various departments (education, public management, social work, law, human services, community mental health) integrating community work alongside academic learning. In addition, the program advances community projects and implements academic courses for members of excluded communities in the fields of community, education and welfare (for example: a course for activists around urban rehabilitation processes, and a course for those promoting social rights for people with disabilities). The program also established an incubator for knowledge development, which has advanced research projects in the fields of exclusion and advancing solidarity.

=== Social Justice through an Interdisciplinary Lens ===
In 2012, Strier founded and developed this program, together with Dr. Dassi Postan-Itzik and Professor Corey Shdaimah of the University of Maryland, Baltimore. The program is based on parallel and collaborative courses on social justice at the University of Haifa’s School of Social Work, and the Schools of Law and Nursing at the University of Maryland, attended by a diverse group of American and Israeli students. The program aims to advance the development of knowledge and raise awareness about social rights-based practice.

== Awards ==
- 1999-2001. Yosifovich Scholarship for Excellent Research in the Field of Poverty. School of Social Work and Social Welfare. Hebrew University in Jerusalem.
- 2005-2006. Award for academic excellence. Partnership Haifa Program. University of Haifa Board of Governors.
- 2012. Research grant for Excellence in academia-community. Planning and Budget Committee. Council for Higher Education.
- 2016. Lifetime achievement award. ESPANET, European Network for Social Policy.

== Publications ==
- Strier, R. (1994) MASHOV: Engagement, partnership, and advocacy in the community. Hevrat Hamatnasim: Jerusalem. (In Hebrew)
- Strier, R. and Bar Yosef, R. (2001). Entrepreneurship and self-employment of low-income women. Meuravut organization: Jerusalem. (In Hebrew)
- Strier, R. (2006). Center for assistance for families: Theoretical rationale. The National Insurance Institute for Innovative Social Services in Israel: Jerusalem. (In Hebrew)
- Strier, R. (2009). Hidden from view: The story of partnership between early childhood coordinators and parents "in the shadow of exclusion." The Association for Cultural and Sports Centers (for youth and adults). The Department of Early Childhood and Families, Center Region. Meuravut – Center for Partnership and Community Engagement. Jerusalem. (In Hebrew) Fatherhood and immigration: Challenging the deficit theory. Child and Family Social Work. 10, 315–329.
- Strier, R., & Roer-Strier D. (2005). Fatherhood and immigration: Perceptions of Israeli immigrant fathers from Ethiopia and the former Soviet Union. Families in Society, 86 (1), 121–133.
- Strier. R. (2005). Gendered realities of poverty: Men and women’s view of poverty in Jerusalem. Social Service Review, 79, 344–367.
- Strier, R. (2007). Anti-oppressive social work research: A preliminary definition. British Journal of Social Work, 37, 857 - 871.
- Strier, R., Biran, D. & Surkis, T. (2008). Neo-liberalism: Bottom-up counter-narratives. International Social Work, 51(4), 493–508.
- Strier, R. (2008). Clients and social workers' perceptions of poverty: Implications for practice and research. Families in Society, 89 (3), 466–475.
- Karnieli-Miller, O., Strier, R., & Pessach. L. (2009). Power relations in qualitative research: A developmental view. Qualitative Health Research. 19, 279-289
- Strier, R. & Abdeen Z. (2009). Women’s experiences of micro-enterprise: Contexts and meanings. Sex Roles, 61, 566–579.
- Strier, R. (2009). Class competent social work. A preliminary definition. Journal of International Social Welfare, 18, 237–242.
- Strier, R. (2009). Community anti-poverty strategies: A conceptual framework for a critical discussion. British Journal of Social Work, 39, 1063-1081.
- Ben-Ari, A. & Strier, R. (2010). Rethinking cultural competence: What can we learn from Levinas? British Journal of Social Work, 40, 2155-2167.
- Strier, R. & Benjamin, S. (2010). Developing anti-oppressive services for the poor: A theoretical and organizational rationale. British Journal of Social Work, 40, 1908-1926.
- Strier, R. (2010). Women, poverty, and microenterprise: Context and discourse. Gender, Work, and Organization, 17, 195–218.
- Strier, R. (2011). University-Community partnerships: Entangled perspectives. Journal of Higher Education, 62, 81–97.
- Strier, R., Feldman, G., & Shdaimah, C.S. (2012). The construction of social class in social work education: A study of introductory textbooks. Journal of Teaching in Social Work, 32 (4), 406–420.
- Strier, R. & Zidan, E. (2013). Arranged marriages: An oppressed emancipation? . Women’s Studies International Forum, 40, 203–211.
- Strier, R. & Binymanin, S. (2013). Anti-oppressive social services for the poor: Rhetoric to practice. British Journal of Social Work, 40, 1908-1926.
- Strier, R. (2013). Responding to the global economic crisis: Social Work, 58, 344–353.
- Strier, R. (2014). Unemployment and fatherhood: Gender, culture and local context. Gender, Work and Organization, 21, 395–410.
- Strier, R. (2014). University-community partnerships: Fields of paradox. Journal of Higher Education, 68, 155–165.
- Strier, R., Eisikovits, Z., Sigad, L. & Buchbinder, E. (2014). Masculinity, poverty and work: The multiple constructions of work among working poor men. Journal of Social Policy, 43, 331–349.
- Strier, R. (2014). Los Padres de la plaza: Fatherhood in the context of political violence. Men and Masculinities. 17, 4, 359–375.
- Strier, R., Eisikovits, Z., Sigad, L. & Buchbinder, E. (2015). Working men views of poverty: Ethnic perspectives. Men and Masculinities
- Buchbinder, E., Strier, R., Eisikovits, Z., & Sigad, L. (2015). Working poor ultra-Orthodox Jewish women and men: Between economic distress and meaning based on faith. Journal of Poverty. 19, 377-398
- Feldman, G. Strier, R. & Schmid, H. (2015). The performative magic of advocacy organizations: The redistribution of symbolic capital. British Journal of Social Work.
- Strier, R. & Shechter, D. (2016). Visualizing access: Knowledge development in University-Community partnerships. Higher Education, 71, 343-359
- Strier, R. & Werner, P. (2016). Tracing stigma: Triangulating views of long term care insurance in Israel. Aging and Social Policy, 28, 29-48
- Feldman, G. Strier, R. & Shmidt, H. (2016). The performative magic of advocacy organizations: The redistribution of symbolic capital. British Journal of Social Work
- Strier, R. & Werner, P. (2016). Tracing stigma: Triangulating views of long term insurance in Israel. Aging & Social Policy.
- Strier, R. & Breshtling, O. (2016). Professional resistance in social work: Counter practices assemblages. British Journal of Social Work.
- Strier, R. & Feldman, G. (2017). Reengineering Social Work’s Political Passion: Policy Practice and Neo-Liberalism. The British Journal of Social Work, 48, 3, 1
- Feldman, G., Strier, R. & Koreh, M. (2017). Liquid advocacy. Social welfare advocacy in neoliberal times. International Journal of Social Welfare.
- Shdaimah, C., Lipscomb, J., Strier, R., Postan-Aizik, D. Levinton, S, & Olsen, J. (2017). Exploring Social Justice in Mixed/Divided Cities: From Local to Global Learning. Annals of Global Health. 82. 964-971.
- Sigad, L., Buchbinder, E., Strier, R., & Eisikovits, Z. (2018). The meaning of work among immigrants living in poverty in Israel: Replanting roots of belonging. Ethnicities.
- Lavee, E. & Strier, R. (2018). Social workers' emotional labour with families in poverty: Neoliberal fatigue?. Child & Family Social Work, 23, 3.
