= Michal Tamir =

- מיכל טמיר
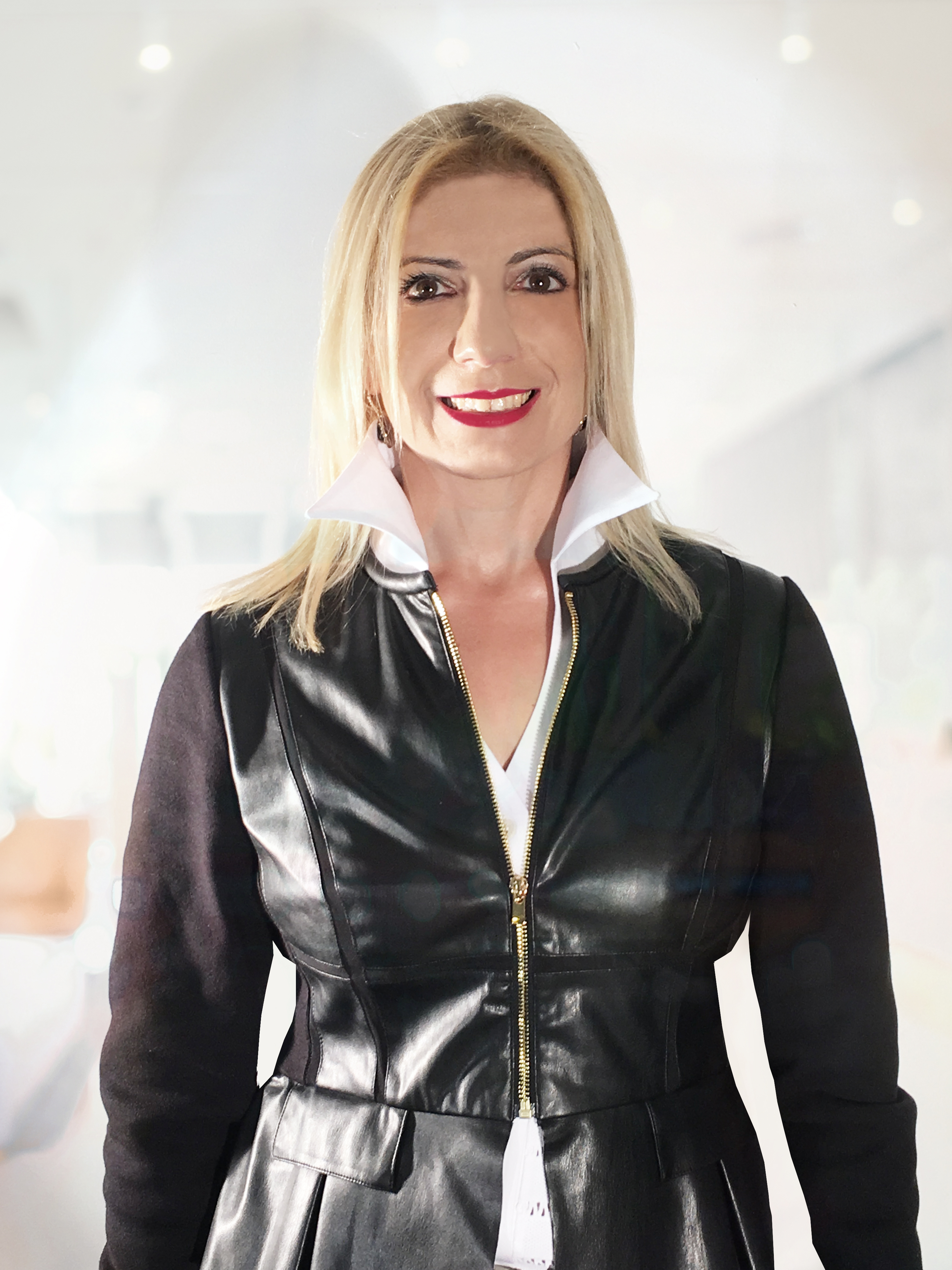
- Professor Michal Tamir
- Born: January 31, 1970; Tirat Carmel, Israel

Michal Tamir (Hebrew: מיכל טמיר; born in Israel on January 31, 1970) is former president of the Israeli Law and Society Association. She is a professor of public law and criminal procedure law in The Academic College of Science and Law, and a practicing lawyer. She is the head of graduate studies department, in the faculty of law at the Academic College of Science and Law and a practicing lawyer.

== Biography ==
Michal Tamir was born on January 31, 1970, in Tirat Carmel, Israel, to parents of Iraqi origin. She now lives in Tel Aviv. She is a professor of law at The Academic College of Science and Law. She also serves as an adjunct professor at the law faculties of Bar Ilan University and Tel Aviv University. Tamir earned her LL.B. in the University of Haifa (1995 cum laude and valedictorian) and LL.M. in the Hebrew University (1999 "magna cum laude", and valedictorian). She received her LL.D. in 2005 from the Hebrew University. Her doctoral thesis was on "Selective Enforcement", supervised by former Supreme Court Justice, Professor Yitzhak Zamir. Professor Tamir served from 1995 to 1996 as an intern of Supreme Court Justice Yitzhak Zamir and in 1997 she served as a legal assistant for Supreme Court Justice Dorit Beinisch. During the academic year 2005–2006 she made her post-doc as part of a part of The Hauser Global Law School Program, NYU. In 2017-2019 she served as the President of the Israeli Law and Society Association (ILSA); In 2012-2013 she served as Tikvah Fellow-in-Residence, in NYU; and in 2021-2023 she served as a visiting professor in the Helen Diller Institute for Jewish Law and Israel Studies, University of California, Berkeley. Professor Tamir is a member of The Israel Bar Association since 1996.

== Academic and Professional Activities ==
During 2017-2019 Tamir was the president of the Israeli Law and Society Association (ILSA). She is also a member of the Association for Israel Studies (AIS). Tamir was part of the first consensus group of the Israeli Congress, which works within the framework of Bar-Ilan University to bridge the gap between a Jewish and Democratic State. Tamir is also active against a “Judicial Reform” that was suggested by the 37th Government of Israel.

== Research areas ==
Constitutional law; Administrative Law; Criminal Procedure Law; Tender Law; Human Rights in Private Law; The Right to Equality and Non-Discrimination; Selective Enforcement

== Publications ==
Professor Tamir wrote the book Selective Enforcement (Nevo Publishers, 2008), which provided the basis for the new judicial review ground on prosecution and administrative authorities. The book is cited frequently in the Israeli Supreme Court decisions. Her second book, The State Comptroller: a Critical Look (The Israel Democracy Institute Publication, 2009), evoked a debate on the intervention of the State Comptroller in public policies issues and non-systematic issues. Her article Equality of Homosexuals and Lesbians (2000) was one of the first theoretical attempts to deal with the issue in Israel and was widely quoted. The article was used in a precedent decision of the Family Court (2004), which approved a family agreement between homosexual couple and the mother of one of the spouse's children. The article was also used in the Israeli Supreme Court decision (2010), which ordered the Jerusalem Municipality to support the activity of the Jerusalem Open House for Pride and Tolerance (JOH). Many other Tamir's articles are quoted in the Supreme Court decisions.
