= Achva Academic College =

Israeli educational institution

Coordinates: 31.7442°N 34.774°E

- מכללת אחוה
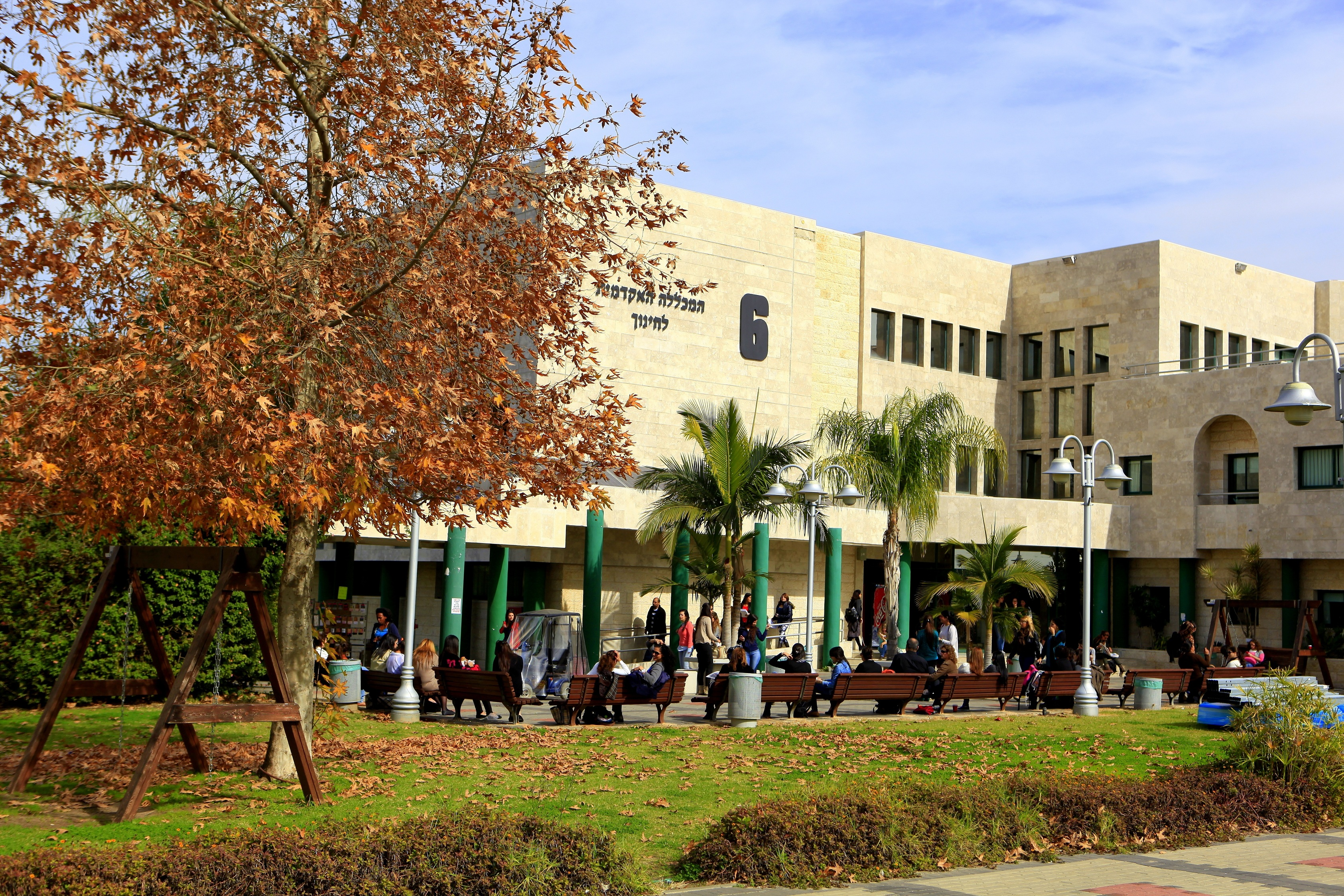
- Established: 1971
- President: Yifat Bitton
- Students: 3,500
- Location: Be'er Tuvia Regional Council, Israel

Achva Academic College is a public academic institution located within the jurisdiction of Beer Tuvia Regional Council.

Achva Academic College offers accredited undergraduate and graduate programs in various fields such as science, education, social sciences, and humanities. With 3,200 students, 500 lecturers, and 20 fields of study including special education, mathematics teaching, psychology, and more, the college also provides diploma studies, continuing education, and preparatory programs. Emphasizing a multicultural approach, it serves surrounding areas, welcoming diverse student groups, including those with special needs and disabilities.

== Centers within the college ==
- Innovation and Entrepreneurship Unit – trains students to be creative educators, entrepreneurs, and leaders who can respond to today's challenges.
- Neuropedagogy Center – combines in-depth study of papers on brain research with their application in learning and teaching.
- Simulation Center – trains students to work effectively in education using learning processes based on practical experience as an integral part of studying education.

== History ==
Achva Academic College was established in 1971 by the Beer Tuvia Regional Council as a teacher training college. Initially offering programs for technicians and engineers, it later expanded to include non-academic teaching courses and supplementary education for mothers.

In 1993, it gained approval from the Council of Higher Education (CHE) to offer academic programs under Ben Gurion University's supervision. By 1995, it could grant B.Ed. Degrees in various subjects. The college received accreditation for its B.Ed. Degree courses in 1998, along with recognition for specific departments.

In 2009, it gained independence, awarding its own B.Sc. degrees in life sciences, and fully separated from Ben-Gurion University in 2012. This consolidation formed Achva Academic College, comprising two undergraduate schools specializing in education, sciences, and a graduate school.

As of the 5781 academic year, the college had around 3,000 students and 500 lecturers across twenty fields of study, including special education, mathematics, English teaching, psychology, and more.

== Tuition fees and scholarships ==
Tuition fees at the college are the same as university fees. The college offers a range of assistance and encouragement scholarships equivalent to full first-year tuition fees for students who meet the acceptance conditions and full-tuition scholarships for students with high acceptance grades. Under the 'Student Communities' project, students who move to Kiryat Malachi and Rahat receive a grant for tuition fees and living expenses in return for social activity within the towns.
