= Azmi Bishara =

Palestinian-Israeli politician; founder of the Balad Party

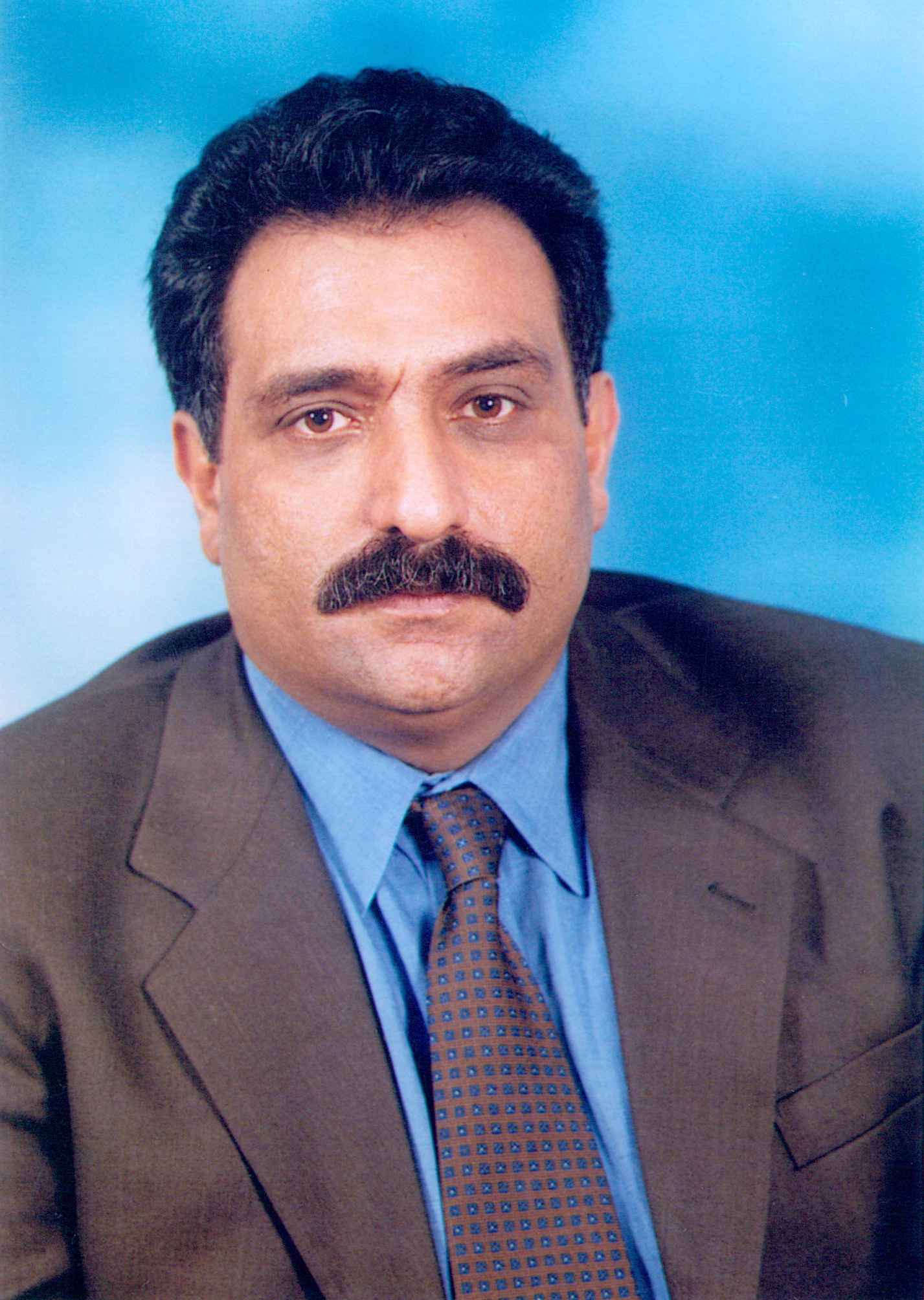
- Bishara c. late 1990s

Faction represented in the Knesset
- 1996–2007: Balad

Personal details
- Born: 22 July 1956 (age 70) Nazareth, Israel

Azmi Bishara (Arabic: عزمي بشارة born 22 July 1956) is an Arab-Israeli public intellectual, political philosopher and author. He is presently the General Director of the Arab Center for Research and Policy Studies and the Chair of the Board of Trustees of the Doha Institute for Graduate Studies.

Born in Nazareth, Israel, his political activity began when he founded the National Committee for Arab High School Students in 1974. He later established the Arab Students Union when at university. In 1995 he formed the Balad party and was elected to the Knesset on its list in 1996. He was subsequently re-elected in 1999, 2003 and 2006. However, after visiting Lebanon and Syria in the aftermath of the 2006 Lebanon War, Bishara became the subject of a criminal investigation for acts of alleged treason and espionage and was suspected of supplying targeting information to Hezbollah. He fled Israel, denying the allegations and refusing to return, claiming he would not receive a fair trial.

Bishara has since established himself in Qatar at the Arab Center for Research and Policy Studies as an academic and researcher. He also helped establish the Al-Araby Al-Jadeed media conglomerate. In 2017 he announced his retirement from direct political work at the beginning of 2017 with the aim of dedicating all his time to "writing and intellectual production".

== Early life and education ==
Bishara was born in Nazareth into a Christian Arab family. His mother was a school teacher and his father a health inspector and trade unionist with connections to the Communist Maki party; his siblings include Marwan (now a political commentator) and Rawia Bishara (a chef, cookbook writer and restaurateur). According to The Guardian, the family's history goes back hundreds of years to a village north of Nazareth.

His political activism started at his Baptist high school, where in 1974, at the age of 18, he established the "National Committee of the Arab High School Students". Bishara stated that he established the organisation because "the general national feeling among Arab students of the need to struggle against racist practices".

During his studies at the University of Haifa, he established the Arab Students Union, as well as being one of the founders of the Committee for the Defense of Arab Lands in 1976. He went on to study at the Hebrew University of Jerusalem between 1977 and 1980, where he chaired the Arab Students Union and was a member of the Front of Communist Students-Campus. After that he went to Berlin and completed his PhD in philosophy at the Humboldt University of Berlin.

== Career ==
=== Academic career ===
Upon completing his PhD in philosophy at Humboldt University of Berlin (then East Germany) in 1986, he joined the faculty of Birzeit University in the West Bank. He headed the Philosophy and Cultural Studies Department for two years, from 1994 to 1996. He has also worked as a senior researcher at the Van Leer Jerusalem Institute.

Bishara is one of the founders of the Society for Arab Culture and of Muwatin, the Palestinian Institute for the Study of Democracy founded by a group of scholars and academics in 1992. He also serves on the board of trustees of the Arab Democracy Foundation.

Bishara is presently the general director of the Arab Center for Research and Policy Studies in Doha, Qatar, also known as the Doha Institute, and a member of its executive board. He is an important adviser to former Qatar emir Sheikh Hamad bin Khalifa al-Thani and to his successor, Sheikh Tamim bin Hamad.

=== Political career ===
In 1995, Bishara was at the head of a group of young Israeli Palestinian intellectuals who founded the political party National Democratic Assembly, Brit Le'umit Demokratit in Hebrew, short Balad. In 1996 he was elected to the fourteenth Knesset (first seating 17 June 1996) on the Balad-Hadash list.

Bishara was planning to be the first Arab to run for Prime Minister in the 1999 election, but dropped out of the race two days before election day, leaving it as a contest between Ehud Barak and Benyamin Netanyahu, with Barak emerging victorious.

In 2003, the Central Elections Committee disqualified Bishara from running in the elections for the 16th Knesset, citing a new clause of the Basic Law: The Knesset which banned candidates who supported "armed struggle, by a hostile state or a terrorist organization, against the State of Israel", and referencing a speech made by Bishara in Syria where he called on Arab states to support Palestinian resistance. His support for resistance was claimed to be an endorsement for suicide bombings, whilst his request for Arab support was claimed to be an "invitation to destroy the state". However, the CEC's decision was overturned on appeal by the Supreme Court in a 7–4 vote. In a later case that confirmed the decision, Supreme Court President Aharon Barak explained the reasoning: "[Bishara's] speeches did not contain clear support for an armed struggle of a terrorist organization against the State of Israel, although they did contain support for a terrorist organization."

After his election, the Knesset voted to remove Bishra's immunity and the attorney-general filed charges against him for supporting a terror organization. The charges were dismissed by the Supreme Court and his immunity restored.

==== 2006 Israel–Lebanon War ====
During the 2006 Israel–Lebanon War Bishara criticized the Israeli government for not providing bomb shelters to Arab areas in Israel's north, and said Israel was using Arabs as "human shields" by putting artillery units next to Israeli Arab villages towns and villages. Bishara also predicted that, because many Arab Israelis opposed the war or applauded Hezbollah's surprisingly strong resistance to the Israeli invasion, there would be negative repercussions for the community when the war ended. "We will have to pick up the bill on this," he said. "If [the Israelis] lose, they will turn against us, if they win, they will turn against us."

In September 2006, shortly after the conclusion of the Lebanon war, Bishara again visited Syria and in a speech warned of the possibility that Israel might launch "a preliminary offensive in more than one place, in a bid to overcome the internal crisis in the country and in an attempt to restore its deterrence capability."

Bishara and members of his party also visited Lebanon, where they told the Lebanese prime minister that Hezbollah's resistance to Israel during the preceding summer's war had "lifted the spirit of the Arab people". Soon thereafter at Interior Minister Roni Bar-On's request, Attorney General Menachem Mazuz ordered a criminal investigation against Balad MKs Bishara, Jamal Zahalka and Wasil Taha over the visit to Syria.

In 2007, Bishara was questioned by police on suspicion of aiding and passing information to the enemy during wartime, contacts with a foreign agent, and receiving large sums of money transferred from abroad. Bishara denied the accusations and said they were part of an effort to punish him because he had opposed Israel's invasion of Lebanon the preceding summer.

==== Resignation from Knesset ====
On 22 April 2007, Bishara resigned from the Knesset via the Israeli Embassy in Cairo, following a police investigation into his foreign contacts, and accusations of allegedly aiding the enemy during wartime, passing information on to the enemy and contacts with a foreign agent, as well as laundering money received from foreign sources. Bishara denied the allegations, and claimed he was staying abroad as he believed he would not receive a fair trial in Israel.

Following a petition by Haaretz and other media outlets to lift a gag order preventing publication of information relating to the specific charges being laid against Bishara, on 2 May 2007 the Petah Tikva Magistrate's Court announced the gag order would be fully lifted. One week prior, the court had allowed only for the fact that Bishara was suspected of assisting the enemy in wartime, transmitting information to the enemy, contact with a foreign agent and money-laundering to be publicized.

Bishara was accused of giving Hezbollah information on strategic locations in Israel that should be attacked with rockets during the 2006 Lebanon War, in exchange for money. Wiretaps were authorized by the Israeli High Court of Justice. Investigators say that Bishara recommended long-range rocket attacks which would serve Hezbollah's cause.

According to court documents "Bishara was questioned twice in the case and during the last encounter he told interrogators that he intends to leave Israel for a couple of days. He said he would attend a third questioning session soon upon his return to Israel".

Bishara addressed a rally of supporters in Nazareth via telephone in April 2007. He told the thousands of supporters that, "My guilt is that I love my homeland... our intellect and our words are our weapons. Never in my life did I draw a gun or kill anyone."

Said Nafa, Bishara's replacement in the Knesset, commented on the charges leading up to Bishara's resignation, saying that "There were many instances in which the Shin Bet tried to set people up ... They're just trying to behead a prominent Arab leader. They will fail." In 2008, the Knesset approved a new law, known as the Bishara Law, which would ban anyone who visited an enemy state from sitting in the Knesset. Another new "Bishara Law" in 2011 led to his Knesset member's pension being canceled.

=== Syrian revolt ===
According to the Financial Times, Bishara has been involved in the formation of the Syrian National Coalition, the main Syrian opposition umbrella group, which is supported by Qatar. Bishara reportedly served as an adviser to Qatar's then emir and crown prince, who succeeded his father in late June 2013. In July 2011, Bishara reportedly said that Assad could have stayed in power had he made the reforms people wanted, writing: "The regime chose not to change, and so the people will change it."

=== Personal life ===
Bishara is married and has two children. According to The Jerusalem Post, he received a kidney transplant in March 1997 at Hadassah Hospital in Jerusalem. According to his website, he is a citizen of Qatar.

== Published works ==
- من يهودية الدولة حتى شارون (Min yahudiyat al-dawla hata Sharon) ("From the Jewishness of the State to Sharon") (2005),
- The Ruptured Political Discourse and Other Studies (Arabic, 1998)
- Two novels of a planned trilogy: The Checkpoint (2004) (Arabic: وجد في بلاد الحواجز) Hebrew translation, German translation, and Love in the Shadow Zone (2005).

=== Arabic ===
- On the Democratic Option: Four Critical Studies (Arabic) Re-published by the Center for Arab Unity Studies, Lebanon, 1993 (with Burhan Ghalioun, George Giacaman, and Said Zeedani)
- Ziad Abu-Amr, with a Critical Commentary by Ali Jarbawi and Azmi Bishara: Civil Society and Democratic Change in Palestinian Society 1995 (Arabic)
- A Critical Perspective on Palestinian Democracy 1995 (Arabic, with Musa Budeiri, Jamil Hilal, George Giacaman, and Azmi Bishara)
- A Contribution to the Critique of Civil Society 1996 (Arabic)
- The Ruptured Political Discourse and other Studies 1998 (Arabic)
- The Site of Meaning: Essays from the First Year of the Intifada 2002 (Arabic)
- In the Wake of the Israeli Invasion: Issues of Palestinian National Strategy 2002 (Arabic)
- Theses on a Deferred Awakening 2003 (Arabic)
- عزمي بشارة (2005). من يهودية الدولة حتى شارون [From the Jewishness of the State to Sharon] (in Arabic). دار الشروق للنشر والتوزيع. ISBN 978-9950-312-16-6.
- The Elements of Democracy Series, Series Editor: Dr Azmi Bishara (Arabic, 12 publications from 1994–99)

=== English ===
- "Religion and Democracy", in: Naftali Rothenberg and Eliezer Schweid, eds. Jewish Identity in Modern Israel, Jerusalem & New York 2002: Van Leer Jerusalem Institute and Urim Publications. ISBN 9789657108369. pp. 140–146.
- "The Palestinians of Israel: An Interview with Azmi Bishara" in The New Intifada: Resisting Israel's Apartheid, edited by Roane Carey; introduction by Noam Chomsky, London; New York: Verso, 2001; ISBN 1-85984-377-8
- The Palestinian elections:an assessment. Harry S. Truman Research Institute for the Advancement of Peace, Hebrew University of Jerusalem, 1997
- Universal instincts; The West, served by Arab "moderates", is attempting to take the Arab world back to the Stone Age, 5 October 2006, Al-Ahram Weekly, issue 815
- Ministry of strategic threats; Avigdor Lieberman's arrival in the Israeli cabinet is symptomatic of the degradation of the country's political system, 1 November 2006, Al-Ahram Weekly, issue 818
- Realities of death; The value of life has little to do with the value accorded to death and the latter, is determined as much by who did the killing as by the identity of the victim, 16 November 2006, Al-Ahram Weekly, issue 820
- A selective memory, 24 November 2006, Al-Ahram Weekly, issue 821
- Strong in spite of themselves; Now is the time for America's Arab allies to whisper advice to Washington, thanks to the resistance in Lebanon, Iraq and Palestine, 8 December 2006, Al-Ahram Weekly, issue 823 as expected; Israel is demanding the absurd, but the illusion is shattered if Arab states understand that the game of axis politics is not in their interest], 22 March 2007, Al-Ahram Weekly, issue 837
- Initiative versus principle; If Israel rejects the best Arab position, perhaps the Arabs should revert to maximal demands and ask Israel to propose a plan, 29 March 2007, Al-Ahram Weekly
- Shattered illusions, 19 April 2007, Al-Ahram Weekly, issue 841
- Why Israel is After Me, 3 May 2007, Los Angeles Times
- Israeli games again, 30 August 2007, Al-Ahram Weekly, issue 860
- Ignorant thieves, 6 September 2007, Al-Ahram Weekly, issue 861
- Headlong to more of the same, 18 October 2007, Al-Ahram Weekly, issue 867
- US war insanity, 8 November 2007, Al-Ahram Weekly, issue 870
- Madrid redux; Bush's peace meeting is nothing but an empty orgy of rhetoric, 29 November 2007, Al-Ahram Weekly, issue 873
- Bishara, Azmi (2021). Sectarianism Without Sects. Oxford University Press. ISBN 9780197602744.
- Bishara, Azmi (2022). On Salafism: Concepts and Contexts. Stanford University Press. ISBN 9781503631304.
- Bishara, Azmi (2022). Palestine: Matters of Truth and Justice. Hurst. ISBN 9781787388291.

=== German ===
- alles ändert sich die ganze Zeit: Soziale Bewegung(en) im "Nahen Osten". Jörg Später (Hrsg.), mit Beiträgen von Azmi Bishara et al., Freiburg (Breisgau): Informationszentrum Dritte Welt, 1994
- Götz Nordbruch Red. & Rainer-Zimmer-Winkel Hg., John Bunzl & Moshe Zuckermann u.a., Beiträge: Die Araber und die Shoa. Über die Schwierigkeit dieser Konjunktion. darin von Azmi Bishara, Beitrag gleichlautend mit dem Gesamttitel, S. 9 – 33 Vortrag im WS 1992/93 an der Universität Innsbruck, von der Red. leicht überarb. & in den Fußnoten ergänzt. ISSN 0935-8684 ISBN 3-932528-37-9 ISBN 3865751016 (Auch in: Der Umgang mit dem Holocaust. Europa, USA, Israel. Hg. Rolf Steininger. Böhlau, Wien 1994 Reihe: Schriften des Instituts für Zeitgeschichte der Universität Innsbruck und des Jüdischen Museums Hohenems Bd. 1 ISBN 3-205-98173-1)
- Die Jerusalem Frage: Israelis und Palaestinenser im Gespräch. Teddy Kollek, Hanan Ashrawi, Amos Oz, Faisal Husseini, Ehud Olmert, Albert Aghazarian, Shulamit Aloni, Nazmi al-Jubeh, Meron Benvenisti, Ikrima Sabri, Michel Sabbah/Uri Avnery, Azmi Bishara (Hg.) (Translated from the Arabic, English or Hebrew by various translators), Heidelberg: Palmyra, c. 1996

== Awards ==
- The Ibn Rushd Prize for Freedom of Thought for the year 2002 in Berlin.
- The Global Exchange International Human Rights Award for the year 2003 in San Francisco at the organization's annual ceremony.

== See also ==
- Palestinian Christians
