= Nissim Mizrachi =

Israeli sociologist

- ניסים מזרחי
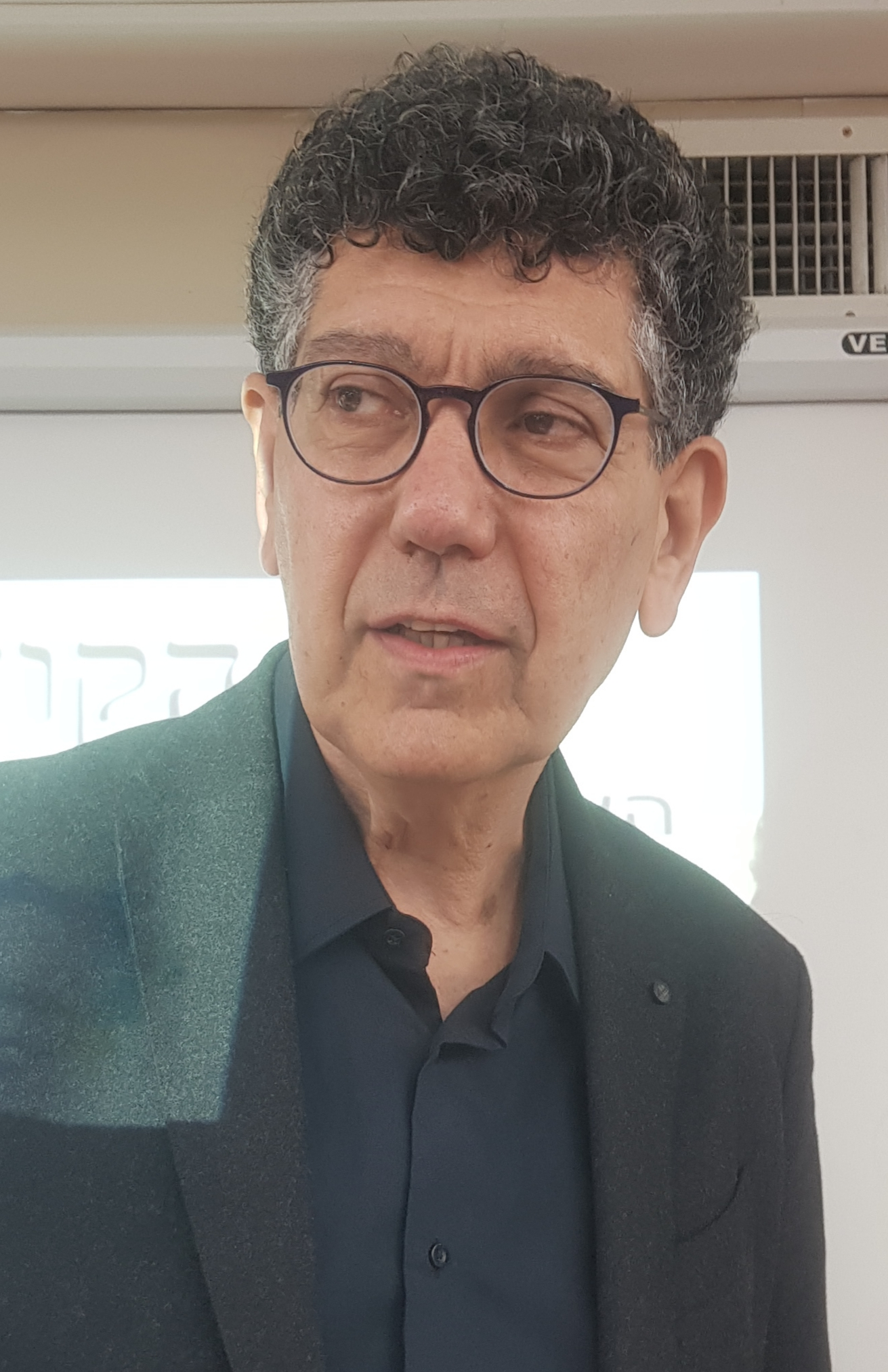
- Nissim Mizrachi, in 2023
- Born: Nissim Mizrachi; 13 August 1962 (age 64); Jerusalem, Israel

Academic background
- Education: Hebrew University of Jerusalem; University of Michigan

Academic work
- Discipline: Sociology
- Institutions: Tel Aviv University; Van Leer Jerusalem Institute
- Notable works: Beyond Suspicion: The Moral Clash Between Rootedness and Progressive Liberalism (2024); Beyond the Garden and the Jungle: On the Social Limits of Human Rights Discourse in Israel (2012)

Nissim Mizrachi (Hebrew: ניסים מזרחי; born 1962) is an Israeli sociologist. Mizrachi is a full professor in the Department of Sociology and Anthropology at Tel Aviv University and a senior research fellow and the head of the “Challenge of Shared Life” Cluster at the Van Leer Jerusalem Institute. His primary research themes are the sociology of knowledge, medicine, culture, social boundaries, moral identity, liberalism, ethnic studies, and stigma. Mizrachi is best known as a leading figure in promoting the post-liberal turn in contemporary critical discourse in Israel. This approach seeks to liberate current research from the constraints of what he calls the "liberal grammar" of critical discourse. This entails a deliberate effort to extricate the research perspective from the liberal-progressive stance that has become the default position for understanding and reforming society. This shift does not imply opposition to principles such as freedom and equality on a normative level. Instead, it involves expanding the interpretative space beyond the confines of liberal-progressive thinking. In his latest book, Mizrachi argues that to understand the so-called paradoxical behavior—the resistance of minority and marginalized groups to principles of equality and freedom from which they are more likely to benefit—it is essential to acknowledge a deep-seated need for belonging. Recognizing this sense of rootedness, which reflects the intrinsic desire for connection, is vital for grasping the conditions under which liberal values such as equality and freedom can thrive. He asserts that taking rootedness seriously is crucial for opening new avenues to preserve democracy in a landscape of profound diversity.

== Biography ==
Nissim Mizrachi was born and raised in Kiryat HaYovel, a working-class neighborhood in Jerusalem predominantly populated by Mizrahi Jews, immigrants from Middle Eastern and North African countries. The neighborhood also included other Jewish communities, such as Ashkenazi Jews, primarily Eastern European immigrants. He is the son of Doris, an Iraqi-born woman who moved to Israel in adulthood, and Rachamim Mizrachi, a native Israeli, working class parents who both lost their eyesight at two. Nissim has two older sisters. Mizrachi earned a B.A. in Philosophy & Sociology and an M.A. summa cum laude in Sociology and Anthropology, both from the Hebrew University of Jerusalem. He earned his Ph.D. in 1998 from the University of Michigan, Ann Arbor, with the assistance of the Fulbright Program, and a postdoc at Harvard University. In 2016, he was a visiting professor at the University of California, Berkeley. He has been teaching in the Department of Sociology and Anthropology at Tel Aviv University since 2001, was appointed senior lecturer with tenure in 2006, and has served as a full professor since 2024. He served as head of the department from 2013 to 2016. He is a senior research fellow and head of the Challenge of Shared Life Cluster at the Van Leer Jerusalem Institute and the Shaharit Institute.

Mizrachi won the Sociology of Culture's Clifford Geertz Award for Best Article from the American Sociological Association in 2008; the Louis Guttman Award for Best Article from the Israel Sociological Society in 2013 and the rector’s prize for excellence in teaching at Tel Aviv University.

== Family ==
Nissim Mizrachi is married to Iris, an ophthalmologist at Sheba Medical Center, and has three daughters.

== Mizrachi’s Research ==
Mizrachi researched two main fields: from the beginning of his academic life until approximately 2009, he studied the correlation between epistemology and social practice, especially psychosomatic medicine, in modern medicine. Since 2009, he has dedicated his studies to the sociology of liberalism and human rights, morality, ethnicity, and social difference. He focused on the mismatch between the liberal-progressive universal philosophical view and the social particularity of its advocates and adversaries.

=== The sociology of liberalism and human rights ===
In a series of articles beginning in 2000, Mizrachi explored the abyss separating the liberal-progressive universal worldview and the social particularity of its advocates and adversaries. He described the way psychological sciences supplied the scientific bedrock for the cultural domination and subordination of the Mizrahi Jew. Mizrachi examined the trust relations between Israeli and Jordanian managers at an Israeli-Jordanian industrial site and how trust transforms in response to the changing political climate. He showed how students in Israeli high schools, regardless of ethno-class dissemination in academic tracking, renounce identity politics and regard free will as the most significant role in their advancement. He explored three minority groups in Israel: Mizrahim, Arab Israelis, and Ethiopian Jews. The Arabs, the less participating group in Israeli society, use racist language when relating to stigmatizing experiences. Ethiopian Jews, the most visually salient, avoid using this language. Mizrahim viewed the mere mention of stigmatization as stigmatizing and depicted their group positively.

Beyond Suspicion: The Moral Clash Between Rootedness and Progressive Liberalism

The book, published in the University of California Press, 2024, takes the Mizrahi Jews as a test case of a marginalized community. It seeks to understand how they interpret their disadvantaged status as the majority of Israel's lower class, a working-class group, and explores “the great paradox.” in Israeli politics: they primarily vote for right-wing parties, despite the advocacy by left-wing parties for policies that would benefit them. They reject the agenda of universal liberal justice and human rights and the core values of the progressive liberal left. The book is grounded in extensive empirical research, including surveys and focus groups. Mizrahim's behavior has frustrated human rights advocates, liberal politicians, and social scientists, who view their actions as a paradox. This book offers an alternative understanding that challenges the prevailing liberal grammar. By grammar, the author refers to a set of analytic principles that guide the interpretive act, currently dominant in critical research. He first developed this approach in two programmatic articles. Most critical scholars have justified the failure of the liberal message to connect with disempowered communities using two methods: first, the message is delivered inadequately (such as the messenger's identity, wrong language, and lived experiences) or second, in the way the message is acknowledged (namely, the difficulty of marginalized peoples to be mindful of the message's ability to bring about freedom). The author turned the direction of inquiry upon the message itself.

Unlike most approaches to analyzing the political behavior of Mizrahim, the rural poor in America, peasants in Western and Eastern Europe and Asia, and others, which view their non-liberal stance as simply a "reactive" phenomenon arising from their structural position or historical, social, and economic forces, Mizrachi argues that these perspectives overlook the generative foundation of their behavior. He identifies this foundation in what he terms "rooted grammar." In contrast to liberal grammar, which values individual autonomy, equality, rational inquiry, and universal reason as the sole authentic human choice, rooted grammar posits that the self is deeply connected to, and even molded by, a larger whole that existed in the past, exists in the present, and must be preserved for future generations. Mizrachi contends that rootedness characterizes not only traditional Mizrahim but also various groups within the Jewish and general populations in Israel and worldwide. Rootedness is an expression of a fundamental need for belonging. Mizrahi argues that failing to recognize this need undermines understanding seemingly paradoxical behaviors concerning equality and freedom. When these values infringe upon the sense of belonging, they are constantly rejected by many communities because they threaten their core identity, which is deeply rooted in the greater whole to which they belong. A methodological turn facilitates the theoretical shift he undertakes in the book, which he calls "multiple hermeneutics." This approach aims to transform the non-liberal subject from a passive object—either a "victim" or a "victimizer"—into an active subject: an interpreter, critic, and analyst of their position within the social structure.

This approach aims to foster empathy and understanding by uncovering the roots, culture, and social boundaries of the Mizrahi Jews. The progressive left and critical observers regard inequality as static, based on power relations and social reproduction, and hidden from the subjects. They view the Mizrahim as victims of the Zionist-Ashkenazi hegemony. Contrary to this view, the subjects recognize inequality but don't perceive it as static; instead, it changes over time. They don't realize this as discrimination but as a natural state-building process. They don't consider themselves as an oppressed minority but as equal partners. The empirical evidence supported their point of view by indicating the upward social mobility of the Mizrachi subjects. By exploring the combined alternative grammar of his Mizrachi working-class subjects, the author shows that the Mizrahim view themselves as part of the significant Jewish entity and perceive the Jewish state as the pinnacle of this Jewish entity, a sense of belonging which the author denotes as “rootedness.” The rooted Mizrahi subjects reject the universal identity of the progressive left, which views the state as a neutral entity whose task is to serve universal citizens. The Mizrahim integrate the Jewish religion and the Zionist state into their core identity and consider themselves an integral part of it. They strive for the good of the Jewish State, regardless of their ethnicity. Liberal thinking views familial, religious, and national boundaries as obstacles to individual autonomy and harmonious coexistence. In contrast, the rooted subjects, from both Muslim and Jewish denominations, view such boundaries as a precondition for mutual Respect and achieving peace.

=== Sociology of Medicine and Alternative Medicine ===
Mizrachi's dissertation concentrates on how mind–body dualism was addressed with the inception of psychosomatic medicine in the US at the beginning of the 20th century. He studied the collaboration between medical staff, especially physicians, and alternative practitioners in Israeli hospitals, in which the medical professionals set boundaries to contain them and shield the rooted medical knowledge. Alternative medicine is accepted in hospitals following market demand, and academic and alternative staff work is juxtaposed, but alternative expertise is regarded as inferior. An embracing and exclusion exist in the work compartment, where the medical staff focuses on analyzing and treating specific disease entities. At the same time, the alternative practitioners aren't considered orderly staff, and they concentrate on relieving pain and healthy being. A diversity of noticeable symbolic, geographical, and structural signs demonstrates their exclusion.

=== Further Studies ===
Along with Michèle Lamont, Mizrachi co-edited an issue of Ethnic and Racial Studies in 2012, which was reprinted as a book by Routledge under the name Ordinary People Doing Extraordinary Things. The book offers a systematic qualitative cross-national exploration of how minority groups counter exclusion and stigmatization. The study was conducted in Brazil, Canada, France, Israel, South Africa, Sweden, and the USA.

In 2016, Mizrachi co-edited the book Getting Respect, published by Princeton University Press. The book explores how ordinary people accept stigma and discrimination and their reactions. The study was constructed on 400 interviews with Middle- and working-class people: African Americans in New York's outskirts, Rio de Janeiro's Afro-Brazilians, Arab Israelis, Ethiopian Jews, and Israeli Mizrahim. The study's findings are that Arab Palestinians are customarily reticent. In contrast, black Brazilians regard stigmatization by class rather than by race, and African Americans are more outspoken than Ethiopian Jews and Mizrahim, who tend to devalue their ostracism. He co-edited an issue of the journal Israel Studies Review with Menachem Mautner (Resisting Liberalism in Israel—the Case of Marginalized Mizrahim, 2016).

Together with Jerry A. Jacobs, Mizrachi wrote an article about the centrality of American sociology worldwide, its massive clout on the discipline outside of the US, and its ramifications for the power structure and the knowledge establishment.

== Books and Edited Volumes ==
=== books ===
- Mizrachi, N. (2024) Beyond Suspicion: The Moral Clash between Rootedness and Progressive Liberalism. Berkeley: University of California Press.
- Lamont, M., Moraes Silva, G., Guetzkow, J., Welburn, J. Mizrachi, N., Herzog H., and Reis, E. (2016). Getting Respect: Dealing with Stigma and Discrimination in the United States, Brazil, and Israel. Princeton: Princeton University Press.

=== Edited volumes ===
- Mizrachi, N. (ed.) (2022). Transcending the Liberal Grammar of Critical Sociology: The Theoretical Turn in Israeli Sociology. N. Mizrachi, Sadeh K. (eds.), Special Issue, The American Sociologist.
- Ziv, N., Mor, S., Eichengreen, A., Mizrachi, N., and Kanter, A. (Eds.) (2016). Disability Studies Reader. Jerusalem: HaKibbutz HaMeuchad and the Van Leer Jerusalem Institute. .(לימודי מוגבלויות: מקראה) [Hebrew]
- Mizrachi, N. and Mautner M. (eds.) (2016). Resisting Liberalism in Israel—the Case of Marginalized Mizrahim. Special Issue, Israel Studies Review.
- Lamont, M. and Mizrachi, N. (Eds.) (2012). Responses to Stigmatization in Comparative Perspectives, Special Issue, Ethnic and Racial Studies 35(3). Reprinted in book form: Lamont, M. and Mizrachi, N. (Eds.) (2013). Responses to Stigmatization in Comparative Perspective. London and New York: Routledge.
- Mizrachi, N., Yonah Y., and Feniger, Y. (Eds.) (2013). The Practice of Difference in Israeli Education, A View from Below. Jerusalem: HaKibbutz HaMeuchad and the Van.(פרקטיקה של הבדל בשדה החינוך בישראל: מבט מלמטה) [Hebrew] Institute Jerusalem Leer.
- Mizrachi, N. and Sadeh, K. (eds.) Beyond the Liberal Imagination of Critical Research in Israel. Jerusalem: The Van Leer Jerusalem Institute and HaKibbutz HaMeuchad [Hebrew] (forthcoming) .(מעבר לדמיון הליברלי של המחקר הביקורתי בישראל)

== See also ==
- Postliberalism
- Critical discourse analysis
- Racism in Israel
- Right-wing populism
- psychosomatic medicine
