= Van Leer Jerusalem Institute =

Israeli research institute

Coordinates: 31°46′12″N 35°12′55″E

Van Leer Institute
- מכון ון ליר בירושלים
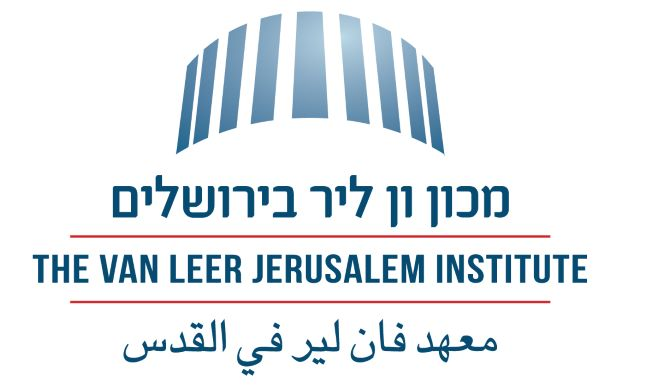

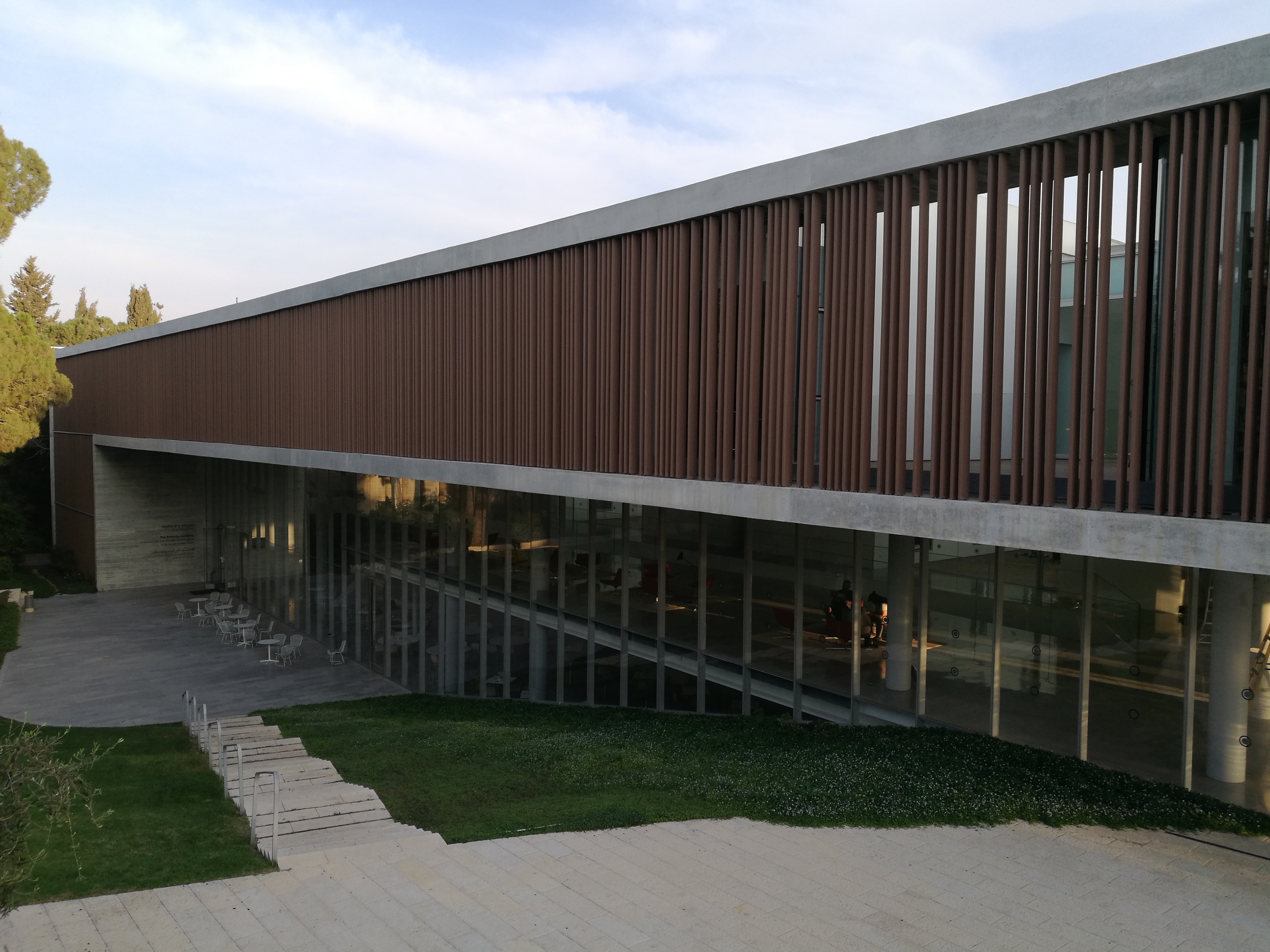
- Founder: Polly Van Leer
- Registration no.: 510691983
- Headquarters: Talbiya
- Location: Jerusalem, Israel
- Director: Shai Lavi
- Board of directors: Fay Twersky; Yarom Ariav; Michael Feigelson; Prof. Ute Frevert; Prof. Ruth HaCohen; Prof. Barak Medina; Marc Polonsky; Reem Younis
- Publication: Hazman Hazeh (These Times)
- Affiliations: van Leer Foundation
- Revenue: ₪ 31,552,000 NIS (2024)
- Expenses: ₪31,056,000 NIS (2024)
- Website: http://www.vanleer.org.il

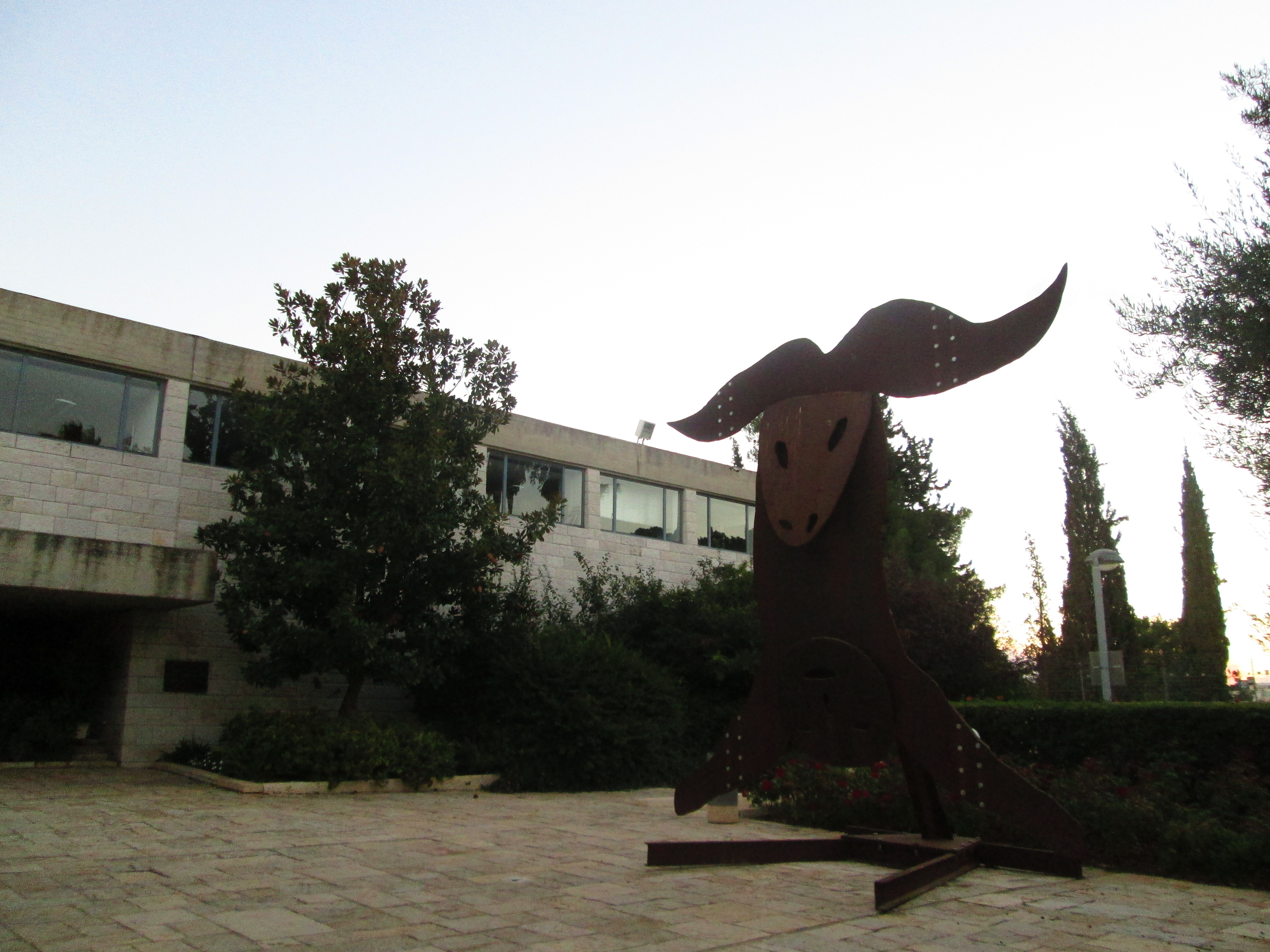
Van Leer Jerusalem Institute.

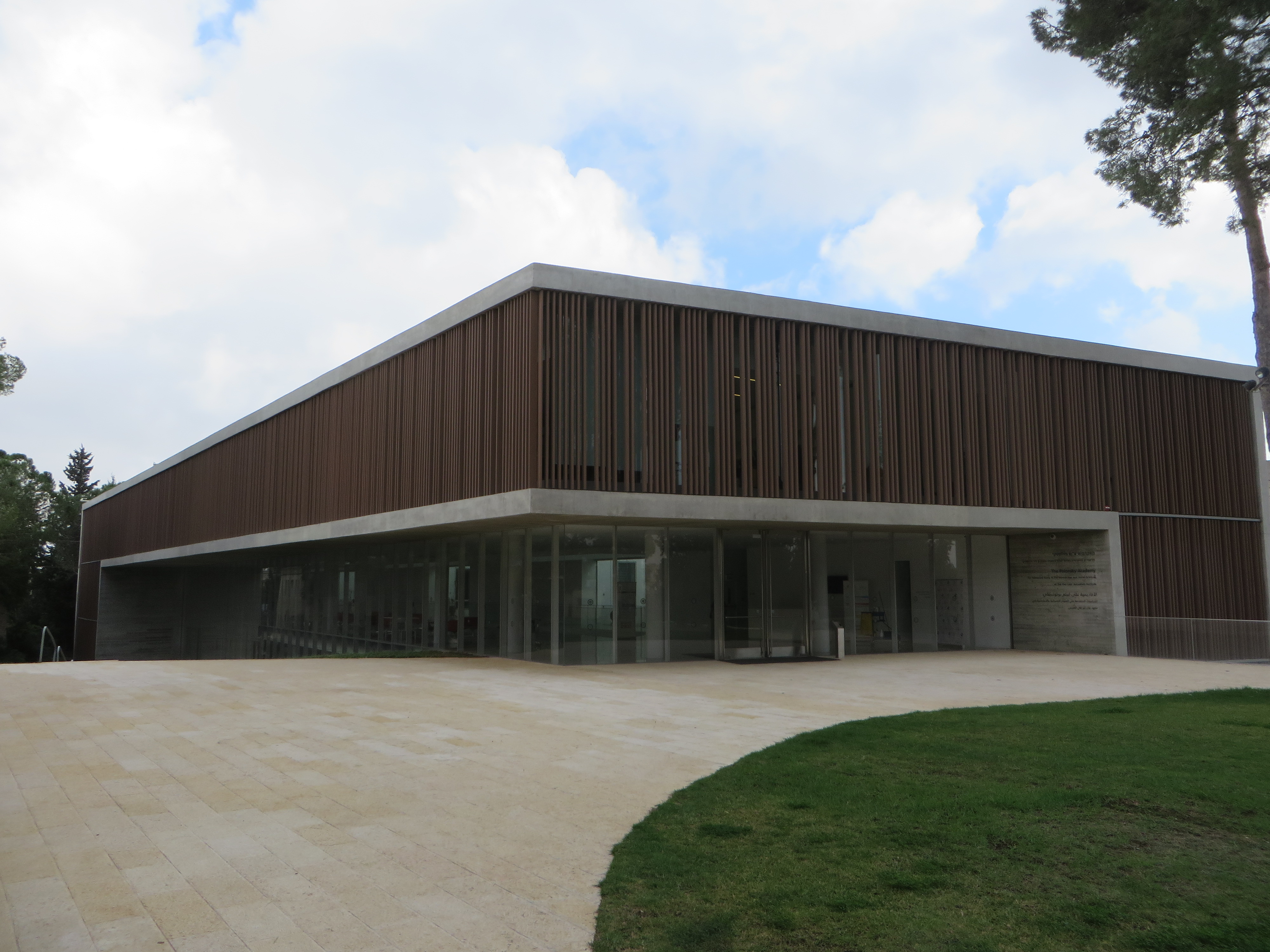
The Polonsky Academy for Advanced Studies building, behind the main Van Leer Jerusalem Institute building.

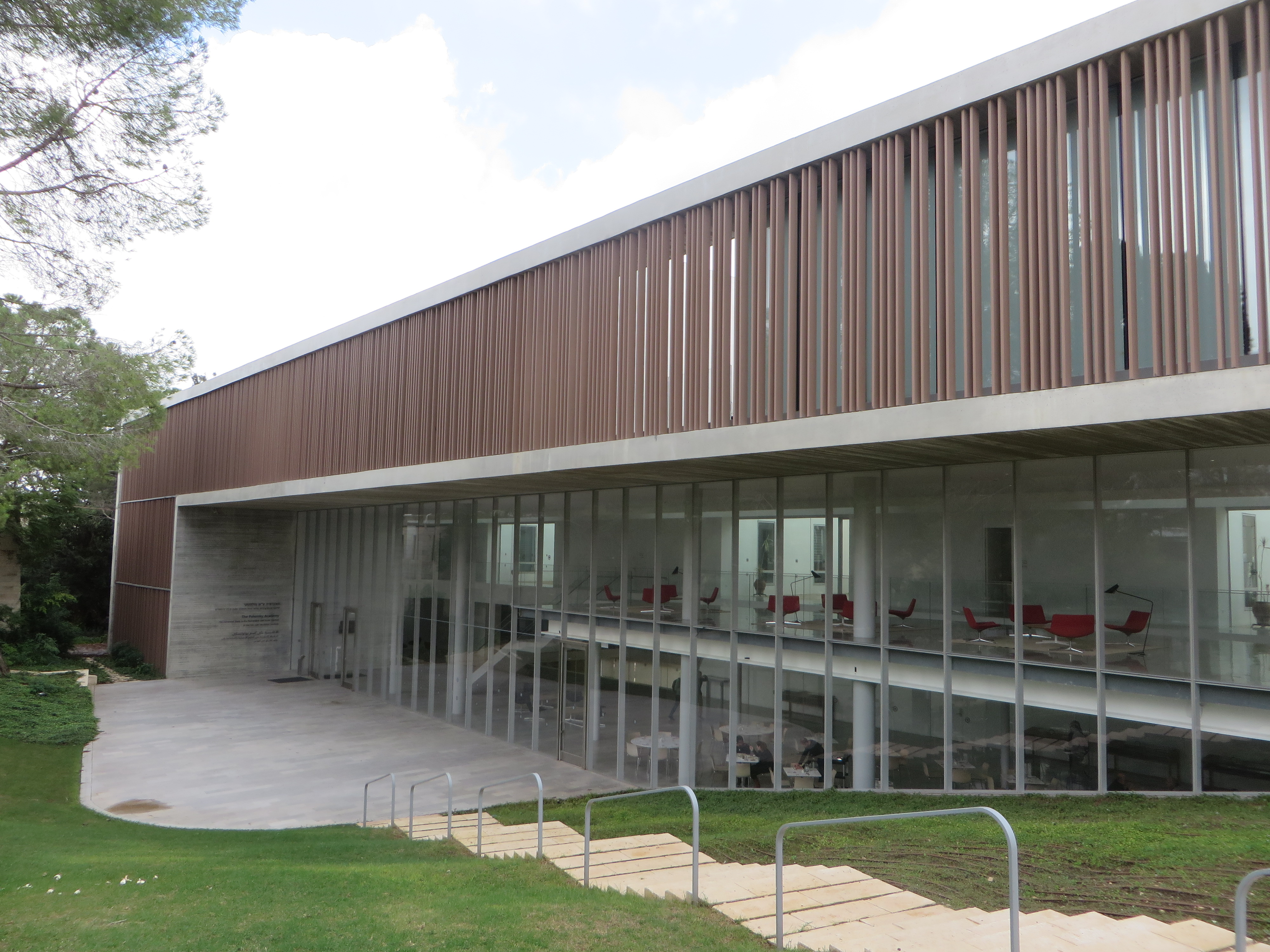
Side view of the Polonsky Academy for Advanced Studies building

The Van Leer Jerusalem Institute is an Israeli center for interdisciplinary study in the humanities and social sciences, and the development of new ways of addressing questions of global concern that hold special importance for Israeli society and the region.

== History ==
The Van Leer Institute was established in 1959 by Polly Van Leer, of the European branch of the Van Leer family from the Netherlands, as a "cultural research institute for the betterment of humanity". The stated goals of the institute are to "advance knowledge in the realms of philosophy, society, and culture", to enhance ethnic and cultural understanding, ease social tensions and promote democratic values through academic research, public policy analysis, advocacy and civil society projects. The institute organizes domestic and international conferences, symposia and workshops, publishes books, periodicals and monographs, and promotes pluralistic public dialogue.

=== Campus ===
The Institute is located in Jerusalem's Talbiya neighborhood, next door to the official residence of the President of Israel.

The original building was designed in the 1960s by Reznik Architects and Povzner Architects, and included offices for scholars, a library, a large auditorium and a smaller conference room, as well as extensive public areas. A second building, part of the same campus, houses the Israel Academy of Sciences and Humanities and the Council for Higher Education. A central element of the design is a large courtyard, which houses a larger-than-life statue of Albert Einstein – a replica of the Albert Einstein Memorial in Washington, D.C.

An additional building, housing the Polonsky Academy for Advanced Study in the Humanities and Social Sciences, was built and inaugurated in 2013. The building was designed by Chyutin Architects with two goals in mind: creating a new, integral part of the existing campus, which would fit in with the existing buildings; and designing in an environmentally sensitive way, preserving the skyline and keeping in mind strict green building standards. The Polonsky Academy building is energy efficient, utilizing natural lighting and an innovative geo-thermal tunnel HVAC system. In 2024, a solar panel array was installed on the roof of the Polonsky Academy building.

The two buildings house together a 27,000-volume library devoted to philosophy, philosophy of science, historical sociology and political theory.

== Activities ==
The Institute is active in five main areas: Israel in the Middle East; Sacredness, Religion, and Secularization; Science, Technology, and Society; the Challenge of Living Together; and Feminism and Gender.

== Academic research ==
=== Israel in the Middle East ===
The Van Leer Jerusalem Institute is led by Dr. Assaf David, and its approach in its studies of the Middle East is based on a view of Israel as an inherent member of the region, rather than an outlier or a "villa in the jungle". As such, the Israel in the Middle East research cluster focuses on Israel's regional context, "examining the political, cultural, social, and economic factors tying Israel and its population to states and populations in the Middle East."

==== Research Activity ====
The Israel in the Middle East cluster is host to a binational interdisciplinary group that aims to "explore the circumstances required to promote reconciliation between Israelis and Palestinians based on political, communal, economic, and spatial partnership, rather than on separation." One product of this research is an annual conference, focused on "a partnership-based Israeli-Palestinian peace".

==== Ofek for Arabic Media ====
In partnership with the Forum for Regional Thinking, Ofek makes content from the Arab and Palestinian media and public discourse accessible to Hebrew readers, through translation as well as original analyses and opinion pieces.

==== The Maktoob Book Series ====
The Maktoob Book Series is an independent, non-commercial and non-profit cultural project, dedicated to translating Arabic prose and poetry into Hebrew. Maktoob places an emphasis on implementing mutual sovereignty in translation – each text is assigned two translators, one of whom is always Palestinian.

=== Sacredness, Religion, and Secularization ===
The Van Leer Jerusalem Institute's Sacredness, Religion, and Secularization research cluster is led by Dr. Yochi Fischer and focuses on two main concepts. First, it examines the meaning of secularism, as a simultaneous political ideology, philosophical worldview, and set of social practices. Second, it investigates the place and meaning of sacredness in a post-secular world. In both of these endeavors, it places an emphasis on a critical, non-binary agenda.

Notable projects include "Secularism in Israel", a documentary series produced in collaboration with television channel Kan 11 and a consequent seminar for educators working in Israel's public school system; and "Conversations of Secularity: a festival of ideas and conversations".

=== Science, Technology, and Society ===
The Van Leer Jerusalem Institute's Science, Technology, and Society research cluster, led by Dr. Hagai Boas, focuses on two leading relationships.

First, it examines the relationship between Man and Nature, investigating the narrative of climate change and concept of the Anthropocene, and through them - the ideas of responsibility, destiny, religion, humanity and so on. One product of this research is "Anthropocene: The Era of Humankind", a textbook which offers fundamental texts by notable philosophers and scholars of the Anthropocene throughout the world –including Bruno Latour, Elizabeth Kolbert, Timothy Morton, and Elizabeth Povinelli.

Second, it examines the role of societies, communities, and collectives in contending with health challenges. A particular emphasis is placed on the idea of solidarity in healthcare, and several research groups led by this research cluster explore the role of solidarity in overcoming different health challenges, such as organ donations, biobanks, international aid organizations and surrogacy. One notable product is the "Patterns of Giving" project: a series of conversations between surrogate mothers and organ donors, discussing in depth different aspects of giving. This project culminated in a public panel as well as a recently published paper in "SSM - Qualitative Research in Health".

=== The Challenge of Living Together ===
The Van Leer Jerusalem Institute's "Challenge of Living Together" research cluster is led by Prof. Nissim Mizrachi and directed by Ben Bornstein. It seeks to reexamine prevalent normative and analytical assumptions, as pertaining to a challenge faced by many democracies and by Israel in particular - the challenge of how to "how to live together in a deeply divided society". Through this reexamination, it seeks to form a new "liberal grammar of critical discourse," in order to extend liberal thought and to explore innovative ways of bridging religious, ethnic, and political differences. The cluster works on the academic and theoretical levels as well as the social and political, in collaboration with the Shaharit Institute.

=== Feminism and Gender ===
The Van Leer Jerusalem Institute's Feminism and Gender research cluster is headed by Ronna Brayer-Garb and co-directed by Dr. Miri Rozmarin. Its Research Lab for Contemporary Feminist Political Subjectivities reexamines existing theory and practice and aims to provide a "space for interdisciplinary feminist thought" and "new theoretical tools for addressing the gender reality today".

Two notable products of this research are "She Knows (Yoda'at)", a Digital Knowledge Center on Women and Gender in Israel, led by Prof. Hanna Herzog, Prof. Naomi Chazan, and Hadass Ben Eliyahu; and the Gender Index, an annual publication which monitors, analyses and details levels of gender inequality across diverse issues in Israel.

=== Previous Fields of Involvement and Research ===
==== Advanced Studies ====
The Advanced Studies Unit was headed by Dr. Yochi Fischer and is committed to multidisciplinary and comparative research in the fields of humanities and social sciences.

Activities include research groups, workshops, international conferences, and a summer seminar with participants comprising senior scholars in Israel, their international colleagues, and young scholars and intellectuals.

The unit focuses on issues of religion, secularism, and democracy; equality, pluralism, and racism; the state of higher education, especially in the humanities; and issues of history, memory, and reconciliation from a comparative and interdisciplinary perspective.

==== Mediterranean Neighbours ====
The Mediterranean Neighbours Unit was headed by Dr. Abigail Jacobson. Based, inter alia, on the 1995 Barcelona Declaration and on the establishment of the Euro-Mediterranean Partnership, it was established to promote the study of the region, to influence the way in which the region is portrayed and understood, and to encourage understanding and dialogue between Israelis and their neighbours. Israeli and Palestinian scholars led pioneering studies and cross-border projects including academic discussion groups, workshops, conferences, and publications.

Specific areas of activity included research, the Journal of Levantine Studies, regional dialogue, and involvement in the Anna Lindh Foundation.

==== Manarat: The Van Leer Center for Jewish-Arab Relations ====
The Manarat Center, headed by Dr. Yonatan Mendel, was established in 2015 to highlight a variety of issues, including the status and rights of Palestinian citizens of Israel, the ramifications of the protracted Israeli-Arab conflict for both Jewish and Arab societies, and Israel's place in the Middle East. The center was involved in research and discourse regarding the challenges facing Israeli and Palestinian society in an attempt to discover the methods and principles likely to promote understanding, a shared life, mutual respect, reconciliation, justice, and peace. The Manarat Center aimed to promote partnerships between Jewish and Arab organizations.

===== Jewish Culture and Thinking =====
The Van Leer Jerusalem Institute's Jewish Culture and Thinking Programs established in 1995, was headed by Rabb Prof. Naftali Rothenberg and promoted interdisciplinary research and public events concerning Jewish culture and thought in Israel and the Diaspora. The programs focused on the identity of communities, the streams and phenomena of contemporary Judaism, Judaism and democracy, and expressions of Jewish culture, thought, and creativity. The Jewish Culture and Thinking Program was a home for both established and young scholars in the humanities and social sciences, as well as thinkers, rabbis, and educators from Israel and abroad.

==== Israeli Civil Society ====
The Israeli Civil Society Unit, headed by Prof. Moshe Justman, focused on creating a body of knowledge on citizenship and civic policy to be incorporated in public discourse and used by decision-makers. Projects – including research groups, discussion groups, round-tables on key current issues relating to social change, local and international conferences, and public symposiums – were thematically clustered around the basic issues of citizenship, social justice, relations between the state and civil society, Arab society in Israel, gender, economics, and education.

== Organisation & staff ==
The director of the Van Leer Jerusalem Institute is Prof. Shai Lavi, a Tel Aviv University law professor who specializes in sociology and philosophy of law. He is currently also the director of the Edmond J. Safra Center for Ethics and the co-director of the Minerva Center for the Interdisciplinary Study of the End of Life, both at Tel Aviv University.

=== Past Directors ===
- 2007-2016 – Gabriel Motzkin
- 1997-2007 – Shimshon Zelniker
- 1994-1997 – Nehemia Levtzion
- 1968-1993 – Yehuda Elkana

=== Board of Trustee ===
The Van Leer Jerusalem Institute's Board of Trustees includes (as of 2024) the following members:

- Fay Twersky (Chair of the Board)
- Yarom Ariav
- Michael Feigelson (CEO of the Van Leer Group Foundation)
- Prof. Ute Frevert (also a Director at the Max Planck Institute for Human Development and Scientific Member of the Max Planck Society)
- Prof. Ruth HaCohen (Pinczower)
- Prof. Barak Medina
- Mr. Marc Polonsky (Managing Trustee of The Polonsky Foundation)
- Ms. Reem Younis

=== Academic Committee ===
The academic committee currently includes:

- Prof. Shai Lavi (Director of the Van Leer Jerusalem Institute)
- Mr. Shimon Alon (COO)
- Dr. Yochi Fischer, Director of Sacredness, Religion, and Secularization
- Dr. Hagai Boas, Director of Science, Technology, and Society
- Dr. Assaf David, Director of Israel in the Middle East
- Prof. Nissim Mizrachi, Senior Research Fellow and Head of the Challenge of Shared Life Cluster
- Orna Yoeli Benbenisty

Previous members include Prof. Moshe Justman, Dr. Abigail Jacobson and Prof. Amnon (Nono) Raz-Krakotzkin.

=== Notable scholars and fellows ===
- Azmi Bishara
- S. N. Eisenstadt
- Rachel Elior
- Menachem Friedman
- Ruth Gavison
- Naomi Hazan
- Hanna Herzog
- Avishai Margalit
- Paul Mendes-Flohr
- Adi Ophir
- Filip Ivanović (politician)
- Naftali Rothenberg
- Yehouda Shenhav

== The Van Leer Institute Press ==
=== Journals ===
The Van Leer institute currently publishes two peer-reviewed academic journals in Hebrew – Theory and Criticism and Hazman Hazeh. Previously-published journals in English include the Journal of Levantine Studies and Contributions to the History of Concepts. From 2011 to 2020, it also published Identities: Journal of Jewish Culture and Identity, a Hebrew-language journal.

==== Theory and Criticism ====
Theory and Criticism, founded in the early 1990s is a journal for theoretical thought and critical study that appears twice a year in Hebrew. It aims to offer "theoretical discussions and new forms of critique", discussing a wide range of political and cultural issues, in Israel and around the world, from a comparative perspective and in a global context. Critical thoughts and ideas put forward by the journal have received some criticism, such as Ofira Seliktar's claim that it is very critical of Israel.

The journal's editor-in-chief is Dr. Shaul Setter.

==== Hazman Hazeh (These Times) ====
Hazman Hazeh is a magazine of political thought, culture and science. Articles are published weekly on the magazine's website, and print issues appear twice a year. Both online and print editions are available free of charge to the public. The journal's editor-in-chief is Dr. Ofry Ilany.

== See also ==
- Culture of Israel
