= Yarom Ariav =

Israeli civil servant

- ירום אריאב
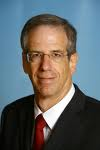
- Yarom Ariav

Personal details
- Born: June 15, 1954 (age 72) Kibbutz Kabri, Israel
- Citizenship: Israel
- Education: Hebrew University of Jerusalem (1984, M.A., Economics, International Relations); Hebrew University of Jerusalem (1981, B.A., Economics)

Yarom Ariav (Hebrew: ירום אריאב; born June 15, 1954) is an Israeli-born economist who was the Director General of the Ministry of Finance (Israel) from 2007 to 2009, and former president and CEO of ICL Fertilizers Europe, a division of ICL Group Ltd.

== Biography ==
Ariav was born in Kibbutz Kabri as the eldest son of Ziona, a teacher by profession, and Omri Ariav, who served in the Israeli Air Force as a fighter pilot. When he was about two months old, his father was killed in a training accident. After the death of his father, he moved with his mother to live in Kibbutz Ein Harod, and then to Ramat Hasharon. Ariav served in the Israel Defense Forces between the years 1972–1977, and was discharged with the rank of major. At the Hebrew University of Jerusalem, he graduated with honors with a bachelor's degree in economics (1981) and a master's degree in economics and international relations (1984).

== Finance Ministry career ==
In 1985, he began working in the budget department of the Ministry of Finance (Israel), alongside work as a lecturer at the Hebrew University. In 1989, Ariav was appointed Deputy Director of Budgets in charge of the economic ministries. He played a central role in implementing major economic reforms in the economy and worked, among other things, to establish an initiative to encourage venture capital funds. In 1993 he left the Civil Service for work in the private sector. In 2007, Ariav returned to the Finance Ministry as Director General. In these politically volatile years, he served under four acting Ministers: Avraham Hirschson, Ehud Olmert (in his capacity as Prime Minister of the Minister of Finance), Roni Bar-On and Yuval Steinitz. He also served as acting budget director at the time of approving the biennial budget for 2009–2010. Ariav navigated the government's economic policy during the 2008 financial crisis. During his tenure, he headed an inter-ministerial team for planning and implementing reform of the Tenders Obligation Law and worked to plan and implement a new Horizon reform in primary education, and headed the Public Committee for The Development and Increase of Competition in the Capital Market in Israel (the "Ariav Committee"). He was known for his social approach and worked to achieve goals to encourage employment and reduce poverty, and headed the government committee to implement the socioeconomic agenda for reducing gaps in society.

== Private sector work ==
In 1993, he served as a representative of the Israel Chemicals Company (now known as in SouICL Group Ltd.th America (1993–1996) and as VP of Marketing at ICL Rotem (1996–2000). In 2000, he oversaw the merger between the Dead Sea Works and Rotem and was appointed VP of Marketing of the new subsidiary "ICL Fertilizers". From 2002 Yarom served as president and CEO of ICL Fertilizers Europe, a division of Israel Chemicals (ICL) Group. Ariav then led the merger of ICL's phosphate and potash divisions in Europe. The merger included the consolidation of the headquarters of the logistics and sales centers of ICL's marketing companies in Europe. Following his term as the Director General of the Finance Ministry, Ariav held a number of roles including CEO of the consulting company Yarom Ariav Ltd., Chairman of Lavi Capital, Chairman of the Investment Committee of Fellows - Veteran Pension Funds, Chairman of the Committee Investments of the Agency's Pension Fund, Hadera Paper Board Member, Zur Shamir Board Member,

== Public service ==
Yarom Ariav has held a number of positions in the business, public and third sectors, including: Chairman of the Executive Board of Ben-Gurion University of the Negev, member of the Global Board of the Van Leer Jerusalem Institute, Chairman of the Lod Development Fund, and is a member of the Israel Advisory Committee of the Wexner Foundation.
