= Naftali Rothenberg =

Israeli scholar, rabbi and author (born 1949)

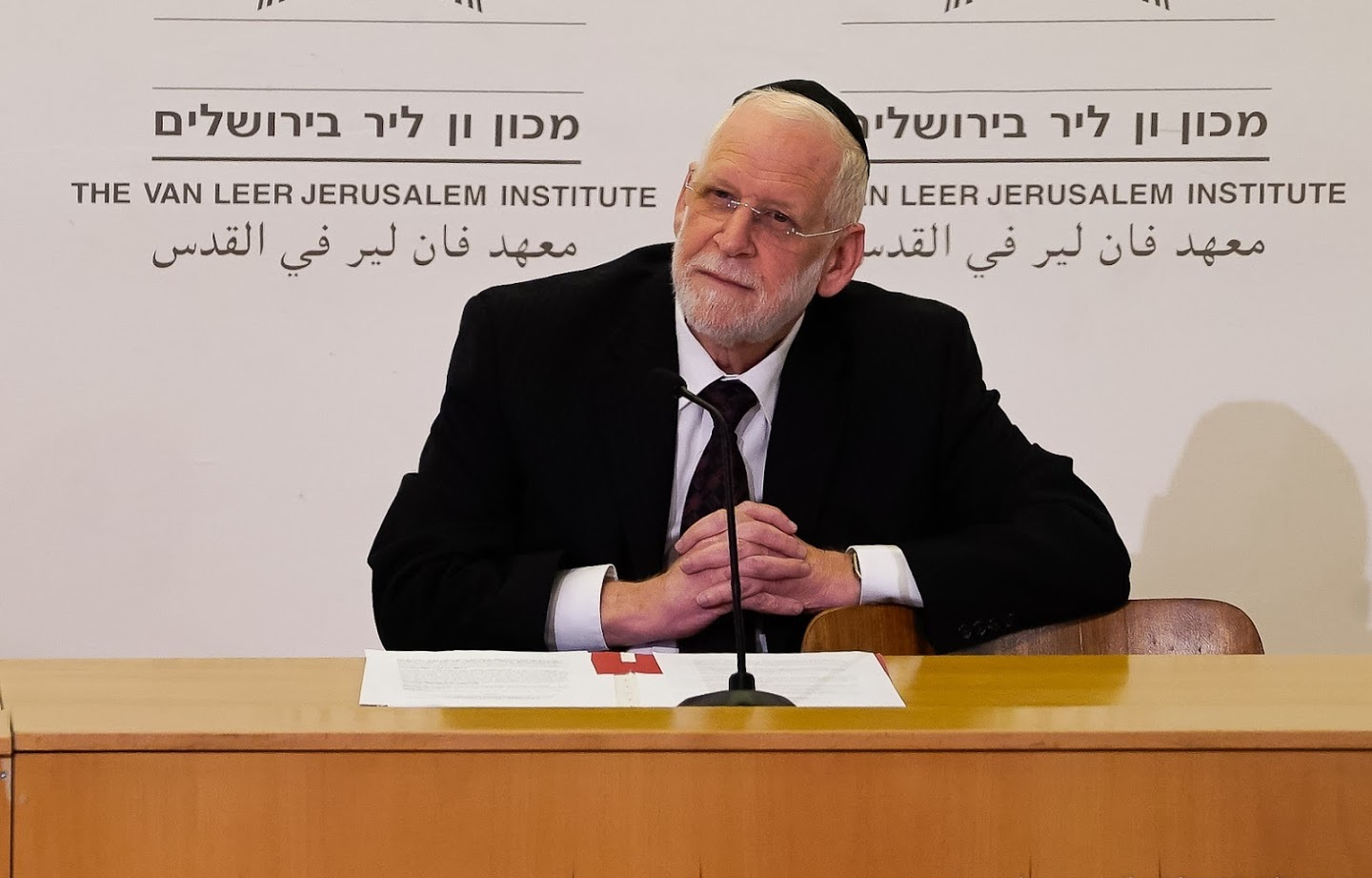
Naftali Rothenberg

Naftali Rothenberg (Hebrew: נפתלי רוטנברג; born 14 July 1949) is an Israeli scholar, rabbi and author. He is known for his studies on the wisdom of love in Jewish Canonical literature and his inclusive leadership in the Israeli rabbinate.

== Education and career ==
In 1973 Rothenberg was ordained at Yeshivas Kaminetz of Jerusalem and in 1980-1984 studied philosophy and Jewish thought at the Hebrew University. He served as the chief rabbi of the Ashkenazi community in Lima, Peru (1974-1978) and chaplain and senior education officer in the IDF (1978-1989). Served as an Associate Professor of Jewish Studies at the School of Management of Touro College in the Jerusalem branch (1997–2003). He is the Rabbi of Har Adar township (since 1986), and a senior research fellow at the Van Leer Jerusalem Institute (since 1994). Since 2014 he has been an Associate at the Oxford Centre for Law and Religion and co-investigator in the Project on Love in Religion at the Center for Religion and Culture at Oxford University. His main fields of studies are: the wisdom of love; democratic education; halakha and state. Rothenberg is the 2011 laureate of the Liebhaber Prize for the encouragement of religious tolerance in Israel.

== Thought ==
=== The wisdom of love ===
Love, according to Rothenberg, emanates from the harmony of spirit and matter, mind and body. The texts he analyses in his works seek to promote just such a relationship between man and woman, which exists simultaneously on three planes: the cognitive-intellectual; the spiritual-emotional—expressed in the feelings the partners have for one another; and the physical—that is the physical contact and union between them. Love’s survival depends upon the constant effort to maintain harmony between mind, spirit and body. The repudiation of any of these three elements, according to the harmonious approach, will thus weaken and even destroy the love bond. Most people recognize two approaches to love: the puritan approach, which they associate with religion, Scripture and “spirituality” in general; and the permissive approach, often considered materialistic and anti-spiritual, even in the eyes of its own exponents. In other words, whether one adopts a puritan or permissive approach or life-style, the premise remains that of a spiritual/material dichotomy, with one's choice being limited to choosing one or the other. The harmonious approach to love proposes an alternative to this dichotomy, while rejecting both puritanism and permissiveness. Rothenberg has published extensively during the past two decades on love in Jewish canonical literature. In his book: Rabbi Akiva’s Philosophy of Love he writes: “Rabbi Akiva's character has intrigued and fascinated me ever since I began to learn and teach the wisdom of love in the canonical Jewish literature, some 25 years ago. He who first appeared in a love story in the legends; rescued the quintessential love song, Song of Songs from oblivion; developed an entire philosophy—and practice—of marital harmony; saw love between man and woman as a sacred perfection of body, mind and spirit; asserted that “love your fellow as yourself” is the great principle from which all morality derives; preached love for all who were created in God’s image; fulfilled the commandment to love God with every fiber of his being, loving Him with all his heart, soul and might, even when all was taken from him—an expression of love to the last breath. R’ Akiva was the only sage that entered and emerged safely from the Orchard of Love. His ideas, theories and praxis laid as a foundation for the study of the wisdom of love. “

=== Halakha, rabbinate and state ===
Rabbi Rothenberg maintains that there is no contradiction between Halakha and democracy. Expressions such as “halakhic state” or “Jewish theocracy” have no basis in halakhic sources. Civil suits concerning financial matters should be brought before rabbinical court (Beth din) if both sides agree. Halakha does not assert, however, that the existing juridical system should be replaced by a system of religious court. A totalitarian regime (even headed by “religious” Jews) would commit acts and enact legislation contrary to Halakha, while democracy is in fact the only political system that does not inherently clash with Jewish religious law. Through his long career, rabbi Rothenberg as a town rabbi, is a member of the Israeli official rabbinate. On one hand, his activities and positions reflect independence and originality but on the other hand, he criticized publicly alternative initiatives on issues of conversion and Kashrut. Nevertheless, on the most fundamental issue of the rabbinate: Marriage and divorce Rothenberg is an advocate of the two tracks solution 1. Marriage: Every couple in Israel will be permitted to choose one of two tracks for marriage: a) Marriage according to traditional Jewish law, through the rabbinate b) Civil marriage by a civil functionary to be determined by the law 2. Divorce: A couple that wishes to divorce will be able to do so in the same track through which it married. Those married through the rabbinate who wish to divorce will do so in a rabbinical court. Those who contracted a civil marriage will dissolve it in the Family Courts. Rabbi Rothenberg strongly opposes any form of capital punishment in Israel. An article he wrote served as the basis for a bill submitted to the Knesset to eliminate the possibility of capital punishment in Israel. According to Rabbi Rothenberg, civil equality and minority rights are not only democratic principles but Jewish religious obligations. He fought against any form of discrimination and incitement against minorities and for the full integration of Arabs and other minorities in all governmental systems.

== Democratic and peace education ==
As a response to the increased polarization within Israeli society as a reaction to the Oslo Accords, Rothenberg established in 1984 an Active Learning Program: Learning the Peace Process, implemented weekly in 500 high-schools throughout the country. This program gave the opportunity to students, teachers and parents, from all political backgrounds and sectors, to learn and discuss the process in real-time, and express their fears, hope and opinions. Rothenberg argue that the underlying problem in Israeli democracy is the absence of a shared civic language. The way to create a situation in which groups that differ in their ethnic origin, ideology, religion or attitude towards religion, or political views can share the same civic concepts is the formal education system. Rothenberg established a team at the Van Leer Jerusalem Institute of Jews and Arabs, religious and secular, holders of diverse political views—who took it upon themselves to address the challenges that face Israeli democracy and lead a process of change and improvement by writing a civics textbook. Their joint effort has been approved in 2014 by the Israeli Ministry of Education. Thousands of pupils in Israeli public schools—both secular and religious—are being using his book to study civics every year.

=== Inclusive Judaism: streams and interface ===
Rabbinic traditions viewed study and knowledge as open to all and opposed the recurrent attempts to consolidate hegemony over knowledge. Committed to the Democratization of knowledge and Exegetical Freedom, Rothenberg established in 1995 a national project of lectures series and publications at the Van Leer Jerusalem Institute and at over 20 other venues throughout Israel. The lecturers and the writers in the series represent a broad range of interpretations and approaches to the canon. Also in 1995, he established dozens of “Learning Communities” as frameworks for study and social activities totally independent from the rabbinic establishment. He worked extensively on frameworks and expressions of secular Jewish culture, including the right to secular expression alongside the religious expressions in the official memorial ceremonies for soldiers who fell in Israel's wars. Rothenberg criticizes the fact that Reform Judaism and other streams are not officially recognize in Israel: “Israel is the Jewish nation state and a democratic country; hence every single Jewish community should be allowed to express itself and uphold its culture and customs.” A rare voice to be heard from an Orthodox rabbi and a member of the state rabbinate. Since the beginning of his long rabbinic career, Rothenberg participates in interface dialog. His main efforts were to reduce religious tensions in the Middle East and to prevent the conflicts from being based on religious disputes. He is a strong voice to the rabbinate majority position prohibited Jews to step on Temple Mount. Rothenberg was one of the initiators and signatories of the Declaration of the Orthodox Rabbis on a new era in the relations between the Jewish people and Christianity. At the 50th anniversary of the Nostra Aetate he said: “First World War and more even the Second World War and the Holocaust caused severe subversion to the ideas of humanism and progress as the foundations for moral behavior and hope for better future…. It is in this crucial juncture that The Second Vatican Ecumenical Council reflected tremendous importance for humanity as a whole as the Nostra Aetate becomes foundation for reality-changing process. We are witnessing one of the main cultures: The Catholic Church goes beyond its own particularity, beyond the limits of religious discourse and inner spirit. The Nostra Aetate process teaches us brave, revolutionary and fascinating of presenting "The Other", even opposer, even seemingly competing in a particular religious discourse.”

== Works ==
=== Books written ===
1. Ta'am VaDa'at (Reason and Opinion), (Hebrew), Jerusalem 2022.
2. Rabbi Akiva’s Philosophy of Love, Palgrave-Macmillan, 2017. Hebrew Version: Torat HaAhavah Shel Rabi Akiva - Carmel Publishers - Jerusalem 2018.
3. Arakhim VeEzrakhim: (Values and Citizens: Civic Education for Public Schools, textbook and teacher's guide (author and editor with a team of 6 others). Van Leer Jerusalem Institute, 2014. (Hebrew)
4. Akhdut Metokh Shonut – (Unity within Diversity: Common Core Curriculum to all Children in Israel), (with Libat Avishai), The Van Leer Jerusalem Institute, 2011. (Hebrew)
5. The Wisdom of Love: Man, Woman and God in Jewish Canonical Literature, Academic Studies Press, Boston, 2009. Hebrew version:Ayelet Ahavim – (Beloved Doe – Studies in the Wisdom of Love) – Yediot Aharonot Publishers – Tel Aviv 2005.
6. BeIkvot Ha’Ahava – (Where Love Leads – Love and Partnership in Jewish Sources) – Carmel Publishers – Jerusalem 2000 (Hebrew)
7. Reflections on Jerusalem: The City of David in Classical Texts (with Leora Tanenbaum and Sara M. Silberman) – Hadassah publications - New York 1995

=== Books edited ===
1. Wisdom by the Week: The Weekly Torah Portion as an Inspiration for Thought and Creativity, Yeshiva University Press and VLJI, New York, 2011. Hebrew version: Hogim Baparashah – the weekly Torah portion as an inspiration for Jewish thought and creativity– Yediot-Sefarim Publishers – Tel Aviv 2005
2. Rav Baolam Hakhadash – Rabbi in the New World: The Influence of Rabbi J. B. Soloveitchik on Culture, Education and Jewish Thought, (with Avinoam Rosenak) Magnes Hebrew University Press and the Van Leer Jerusalem Institute, Jerusalem, 2011. (Hebrew)
3. Leom Meleom - Studies on Jewish People, Identity and Nationality, (with Eliezer Schweid), Hakibutz Hameuchad Publishers and the VLJI, Tel Aviv, 2008 (Hebrew)
4. Jewish Identity in Modern Israel – Proceedings on Secular Judaism and Democracy – (with Eliezer Schweid), Urim, Jerusalem & Lambda Publishers, New York, 2002.
5. Potkhim Shavua - Opening the Week – 54 articles on the Torah – Yediot-Sefarim Publishers – Tel Aviv 2001 (Hebrew)
