= Hanna Herzog =

Israeli researcher and professor of sociology

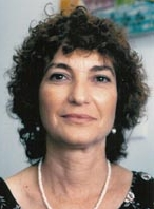
Hanna Herzog

Hanna Herzog (Hebrew: חנה הרצוג) is a professor of sociology at the Department of Sociology and Anthropology at Tel Aviv University and a senior research fellow and the academic director of the Civil Society forums at Van Leer Jerusalem Institute in Jerusalem.

== Academic career ==
She is among the founders of Woman and Gender Studies in Israel which has been in existence since 2000. She specializes in political sociology, political communication, and sociology of gender. She has published many articles on politics. These consist mainly of ethnic and racial relations and women in politics, Palestinian women citizens of Israel, and gender, religion and politics.

== Political activism ==
She has been active in the public sphere in political lobbying, and in the struggle against gender discrimination. She has been a member and board member of the Israel Women's Network (INW); headed the steering committee of the Research and Information Center of the INW; is much in demand as a lecturer and advisor for various women's organizations; is a member of the public forum for the advancement of the status of women in science and academe; is active in the peace movement; served on the public council to examine the structure of the regime in Israel established by the President of Israel; is a member of the council to define military service for women in Israel (2007).

Hanna Herzog has concentrated on the connection between society and politics in Israel with special emphasis on minority groups striving for equality and full integration. She uses the research and academic tools with which she is familiar to advance the academic and political dialog between Jewish and Palestinian-Arab women in Israel.

== Published works ==
=== Books ===
Herzog is the author of numerous books and articles, including:

- Political Ethnicity - The Image and the Reality, 1986 (Hebrew)
- Realistic Women - Women in Israeli Local Politics, 1994 (Hebrew)
- Gendering Politics - Women in Israel, University of Michigan Press, 1999
- Sex Gender Politics - Women in Israel (Written with others) 1999 (Hebrew).

Herzog headed the Sociology Department of Tel Aviv University, headed the Society and Politics Section at the Tel Aviv-Yafo Academic College from its inception in 1994 – 2001). She served as the president of the (International) Association for Israel Studies (1999–2001), as the editor of the academic journal Israeli Sociology (2001–2005). She is as member of the editorial boards of the academic journals in Hebrew and international academic journals.

=== Articles ===
- Herzog, Hanna (Fall 2004). "Family-military relations in Israel as a genderizing social mechanism". Armed Forces & Society. 31 (1): 5–40. doi:10.1177/0095327X0403100102. S2CID 144293980.

== See also ==
- Women in Israel
