= Assaf David =

Israeli political scientist

Assaf David PhD
- אַסָּף דָּוִד
- Education: Hebrew University of Jerusalem
- Occupations: Political scientist, peace activist
- Movement: Israeli left

Assaf David (Hebrew: אסף דוד) is an Israeli political scientist, academic, and peace activist known for his work on Israel’s place in the Middle East, civil‑military relations in Jordan, and progressive regional policy discourse.

== Personal life ==
Assaf David was born in Ramat Gan and raised in the West Bank settlement of Kiryat Arba near Hebron, where he attended a religious school. He is of Yemeni Jewish descent, and his grandparents spoke a distinctive Judeo-Yemeni dialect of Arabic. His cultural upbringing included traditional Yemeni customs and religious practices.

In the late 1990s, while still serving in the Israeli Defense Forces, David was seriously wounded in a Hamas suicide bombing in Jerusalem. He lost his left eye and sustained injuries to his chest and arm. The trauma and long recovery reportedly led him to reflect on the causes and consequences of violence between Israelis and Palestinians.

He later pursued academic studies, during which he developed close friendships with Arab and Jordanian peers. His fluency in Arabic, shaped in part by his family’s heritage and professional engagement, became central to his identity.

== Career ==
David has served as the director of the Israel in the Middle East cluster at the Van Leer Jerusalem Institute since October 2018. He previously taught political science at the Hebrew University of Jerusalem and in the Departments of Middle East Studies and Politics & Government at Ben‑Gurion University of the Negev. He is also a research fellow at the Truman Institute for Peace at the Hebrew University and an adjunct lecturer there and at Ben‑Gurion University.

== Academic research ==
David's doctoral dissertation, supervised by Prof. Avraham Sela at the Hebrew University of Jerusalem, focused on civil‑military relations in Jordan under Kings Hussein and Abdullah II. His research interests include Jordanian state‑society relations, Arab public discourse, Israel’s regional identity, and the development of Middle East studies in Israel.

== Political views and activism ==
David describes himself as Israeli, Arab-Jewish, and Zionist, and often notes that he feels culturally more Middle Eastern than Western. He has spoken openly about experiences of racism within religious Zionism and about his journey from a settler-colonial upbringing to advocating mutual recognition and equality between Jews and Palestinians.

David is co‑founder and academic director of the Forum for Regional Thinking, a think tank dedicated to re‑framing Israel’s regional discourse.

After the October 7, 2023 attacks and Israeli invasion of Gaza, David became a vocal critic of Israeli policy, causing devastation and suffering to the civilian population in Gaza. In February 2025, he co‑edited a policy document titled “The Present Day: Peacemaking Alternatives for Israeli Policy” advocating for an immediate end to hostilities, Palestinian sovereignty, halt to settlement expansion, and educational and regional de‑escalation initiatives. On April 3, 2025, he and Smadar Ben‑Natan presented the document to J Street’s Policy Center.

== Selected publications ==
- “Presence out, Ideas In: Representation and Socio‑Political Change in Jordan”, Representation, Vol. 48, Issue 3 (2012).
- Various essays and analyses in outlets like Molad and The Daily Beast on Middle East issues and Jordan.
- “The Self‑Orientalization of Israeli Politics” (with Arie Dubnov), Public Seminar (February 19 2025).
