= Albert Aghazarian =

Palestinian historian and university administrator

Albert Aghazarian (18 Aug 1950 – 30 Jan 2020) was a Palestinian historian, translator, university administrator, and political spokesperson from Jerusalem. He served in various capacities during his career, but he is most remembered for his role in the public relations office at Bir Zeit University in the 1980s–1990s and for serving as a press official during the 1991 Madrid Conference. He made numerous media and conference appearances during his career and worked as a historian, writer, editor, and translator throughout his life, with a special focus on the history of Jerusalem.

== Early life and education ==
Albert was born on 18 August 1950, in Jerusalem, the youngest of six children. His family is part of the Armenian and Orthodox Christian community of Jerusalem. His grandparents were survivors and refugees of the Armenian genocide. His parents were Elise Tachjian, a seamstress, and Areen Aghazarian, a restauranteur and grocery shop manager.

Albert studied at the Collège des Frères in Jerusalem. He grew up speaking Armenian and Turkish, learning Arabic as a second language as well as English and French. He worked part-time jobs during his youth, including at a newspaper and bank and also in Jerusalem's tourism sector.

For his higher education, he first studied at Birzeit College, from 1968 to 1970. During that time he was involved in student activism, including going on hunger strike in solidarity with political prisoners in Israeli jails. This resulted in his hospitalization. After earning his associate degree, he went on to study for his B.A. in political science at the American University of Beirut, completing those studies in 1972.

He later graduated in the inaugural class of the Master of Arts in Arab Studies program at Georgetown University in 1979. While studying in D.C., he also worked at the United Arab Emirates embassy as a translator.

== Career ==
=== Early period ===
In between his bachelor's and master's degrees, Aghazarian worked as an editor of the newspaper al-Quds, from 1973 to 1975.

Following completion of his graduate degree at Georgetown in 1979, he taught history and cultural studies at Bir Zeit University. He also served as the university's Director of Public Relations. During a difficult period for Palestinian education, especially in the 1980s, the university was subject to military-ordered closures and violent responses to student protests, and Aghazarian was "at the center of this whirlwind." He is remembered in particular for having "plunged into the fight to develop the university—and to keep it open." In his public relations role, during this time, he coordinated solidarity committees with educational institutions in other countries, held press conferences, and met with various officials, including Israeli military officials, among other responsibilities.

Aghazarian was well known as a historian of Jerusalem and for giving tours of the Old City of Jerusalem to visiting foreign dignitaries, artists, and academics, even bringing them into his private home. He was a published writer and translator, too, contributing to such publications as Jerusalem Quarterly. He was part of a group of scholars which founded the Arab Thought Forum (al-Multaqa al-Fikri), serving on the forum's advisory board, and he also served on the board of Dar Al-Kalima University.

During the Madrid Peace Conference, Aghazarian headed the Palestinian media center along with fellow Bir Zeit scholar Hanan Ashrawi.

=== Later period ===
Aghazarian left his position at Bir Zeit in the early 2000s, due to differences with the administration. His departure came also in the wake of an injury from tear gas that he sustained during student demonstrations during the Second Intifada.

During his later life, Aghazarian worked as a translator and was invited to speak at numerous international events and conferences. He continued to appear internationally as a spokepersson for the Palestinian cause, including in forums organized by the United Nations, the World Council of Churches, and other global institutions. In 2002, he served in a formal capacity in a delegation in Amman to the Conference on Christians of Jerusalem, and in 2000 he participated in the Conference on Jerusalem in Morocco.

== Views on social issues ==
Aghazarian identified strongly as Palestinian. He believed in "the pluralism of the Levant" and an inclusive vision of Arabism that did not prevent an Armenian Christian like himself from participating "in an Arab-Islamic framework."

He lamented and resisted the "criminalization" of education under Israeli occupation. When meeting with Israeli defense officials during years of repeated closures of Bir Zeit, he is recorded as having said:

"You treat universities like shops, but education is an ongoing process. We have academic papers, scholarships, and international accords to deal with, yet all you do is open, close, open and close the place again!"

== Awards ==
In 2006, Aghazarian was awarded a medal by King Albert II of Belgium for his role in raising global awareness about Jerusalem.

== See also ==
- Bir Zeit University
- Hanan Ashrawi
- Category:Palestinian academics
