= Shaharit (NPO) =

Israeli think tank and nonprofit organization

Shaharit – Creating Common Cause
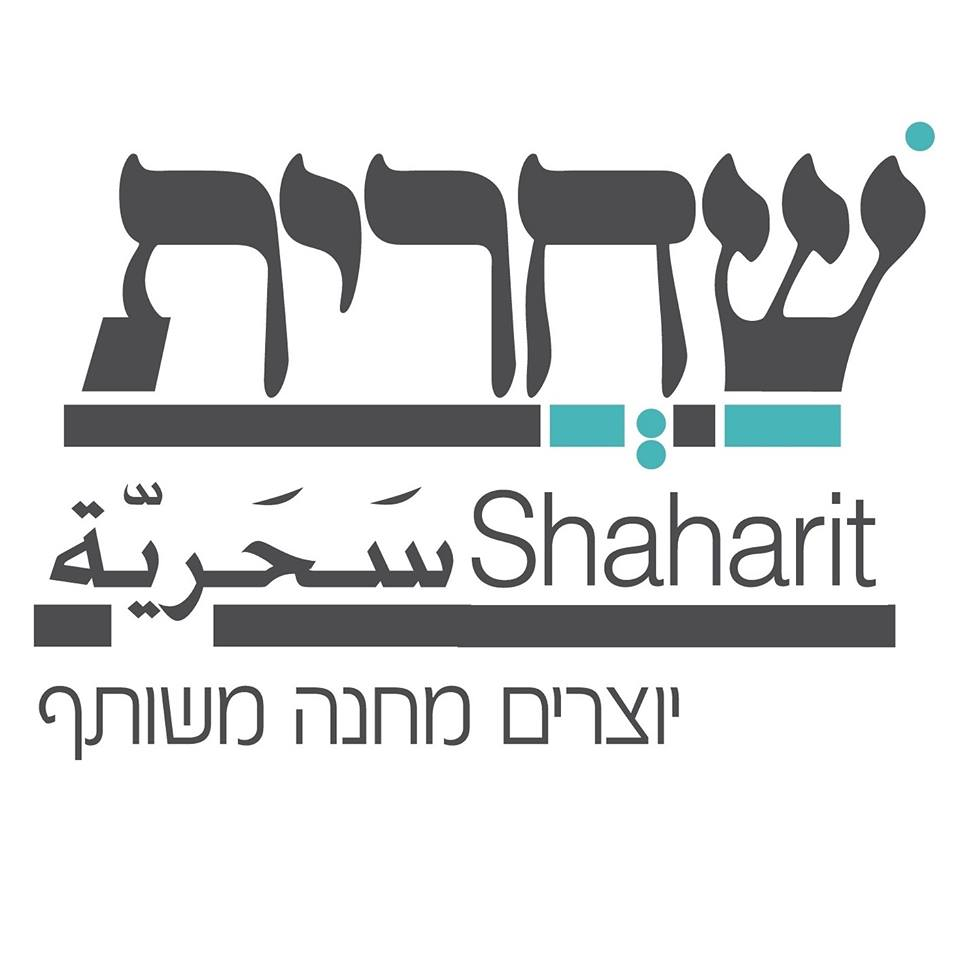
- Shaharit logo
- Formation: 2012; 14 years ago
- Purpose: Creating a new social partnership in Israeli society
- Official language: Hebrew
- Director: Dr. Eilon Schwartz

Shaharit – Creating Common Cause is an Israeli think tank and nonprofit organization, which was founded as a "think- and do- tank" in 2012 to forge a new social partnership between all segments of Israeli society and create a new common denominator by transcending the hackneyed dichotomies between Right and Left, Jewish and Arabs, religious and secular, Mizrahim and Ashkenazim, etc. Shaharit's overarching goal is to "forge common ground between all the groups in Israeli society thereby creating a sustainable future that allows everyone to thrive." The organization is active on several fronts in parallel—local civic groups, an intellectual think tank, and building working groups within and between the various communities that make up Israeli society.

In November 2014, Shaharit held a large conference entitled "Creating a New Social Partnership".

The organization's director is Dr. Eilon Schwartz and the deputy director is Ron Barkai.

Shaharit's advisory committee includes Prof. Haviva Pedaya, Prof. Manny Mautner, and Prof. Nissim Mizrachi.

Shaharit's Institute Fellows include Dr. Ofer Sitbon, Dr. Lia Ettinger, Dr. Chana Pinchasi, Esti Rieder-Indursky, Tehila Friedman, Adina Bar-Shalom, and Nazier Magally.

== Establishment ==
Shaharit began in 2009 with a group of some 25 individuals from a variety of social, cultural, and religious backgrounds (Arabs and Jews, religious and secular, Ashkenazim and Mizrahim, immigrants and veteran Israelis) who met for two years to set forth the foundational principles and intellectual framework for Shaharit, which began formal activities in 2012. The foundational documents state that "Shaharit seeks to formulate and promote new thinking about politics—a tool for society to ensure equal opportunities for all but also praise community values and social solidarity on the local, ethnic, and national levels. The goal is to develop political thought that is seriously committed to protecting the unique value of each individual and his multiple identities while also protecting our shared resources." The preparatory work included meeting with members of the various communities throughout Israeli society, conducting in-depth research studies, and drafting position and policy papers on social and economic issues. These documents summarize how Israel can look in Shaharit's vision.

== Shaharit Conference ==
On 2 November 2014, Shaharit held its conference, "Creating a New Social Partnership," which drew 500 attendees. Conference participants included representatives and leaders from the many communities in Israeli society who spoke about the alternative Israeli reality that is taking shape under the radar and discussed the guidelines for a new social partnership in accordance with modern values.

=== Additional Events and Conferences ===
In November 2015, Shaharit held an academic conference entitled "Whither Israel: What will Replace Israeli Liberalism?" in conjunction with the Department of Sociology and Anthropology at Tel Aviv University.

In August 2015, in the wake of the murder of Shira Banki at the Jerusalem gay pride parade and the murder of the members of the Dawabshe family, which took place in August, Shaharit held an evening of study and discussion together with a group of Haredi residents of Jerusalem that addressed the possibility of repairing the rifts in Israeli society and working together to create a society that strives for the common good.

In June 2015, Shaharit, together with Amutat AMRAM, held an event to mark the Day of Remembrance and Awareness for the Kidnapping of Children from Yemen, the Middle East, and the Balkans.

On the eve of Holocaust Memorial Day 2015 and 2016, Shaharit held an event on The Holocaust and Holocaust Remembrance through Mizrahi Eyes.
