= Menachem Mautner =

Menachem Mautner (Hebrew: מנחם מאוטנר) is an Israeli professor of Comparative Civil Law and Jurisprudence at Tel Aviv University. In 2000–2002, he was Dean of the Faculty of Law.

== Biography ==
Menachem Mautner obtained a J.S.D. from Yale Law School. Mautner teaches at Tel Aviv University courses in the areas of contract law, law and culture and multiculturalism.

== Legal and academic career ==
Mautner was twice visiting professor at Michigan Law School, teaching courses on contract law and commercial transactions; twice visiting professor at NYU Law School, teaching courses on contract law and law and culture - in 1996 he was among the first 20 legal scholars from all over the world appointed by NYU Law School to its Global Law School Program; visiting professor at Cardiff Law School; visiting scholar at Harvard Law School; and visiting professor at Venice International University. He taught at Columbia University Law School in the spring term of 2009.

As a professor at Tel Aviv University Mautner initiated the Law Faculty's "Affirmative Action Program" that was later on adopted by all universities in Israel as part of their admissions programs. He also initiated the "Invitation to Law Program" for teaching law at elementary schools and high schools, particularly at poor communities.

As dean, Mautner led the most far-reaching curriculum change ever undertaken by the faculty, as well as a fourfold expansion of the clinical program of the Faculty. In the course of Mautner's tenure as dean, 8 new members were appointed to the faculty.

In 2007 he was invited to deliver a lecture at the Israel Academy of Sciences and Humanities. Mautner was member of the Committee on the Preparation of Israel's New Civil Code (headed by Professor Aharon Barak, President of the Israeli Supreme Court). He headed the Experts Committee on Revision of Israel's Securities Law, Ministry of Justice. He was the Chairperson of the Public Commission on the Rights of Performing Artists, Ministry of Justice.

In 2006 Mautner was elected by the Senate of Tel Aviv University to serve on the Search Committee for electing the new president of the university. At Tel Aviv University, Mautner also headed the Committee on the Establishment of a University Press; he is currently the President of the Disciplinary Tribunal of the Academic Staff; he was member of the Disciplinary Tribunal of Students; he was member of the Central Appointments Committee. Since 2012, he has served on the advisory board of the Israeli think tank for common good politics, Shaharit.

Mautner is a member of the Israeli Law Professors' Forum for Democracy, established in 2023 to respond to the Israeli coalition's plans for changes in the legal system.

== Awards and recognition ==
Mautner was awarded the "Zeltner Prize for Excellence in the Law", the Landau Prize for excellence in research (2018), and the Tel Aviv University Rector's Prize for Distinction in Teaching.

== Published works ==
Mautner is the author of "The Decline of Formalism and the Rise of Values in Israeli Law" (1993) – the most cited book on the far-reaching developments that have taken place in Israeli law in the past three decades.

Mautner is the author of "On Legal Education" (2002) – the book that paved the way to the change in the self-perception of Israel's legal academy from one functioning as part of the field of legal practice to an academy working in close interdisciplinary cooperation with other academic disciplines.

His book "Law and Culture" (361 pages) on the application of culture theory to law was published in April 2008 (Bar Ilan University Press).

His book "Law and Culture in Israel at the Threshold of the Twenty-First Century" (591 pages) was published in July 2008 (Tel Aviv University Press and Am-Oved Publishing).

His book "Human Flourishing, Liberal Theory, and the Arts: A Liberalism of Flourishing" was published in March 2018 (Routledge Studies in Social and Political Thought)

He edited four legal books, including "Multiculturalism in a Democratic and Jewish State" and "Distributive Justice in Israel". Mautner published over 70 articles and chapters in books in Israel, the United States and Britain (including at the law reviews of Yale and Michigan universities) in the areas of contract law, law and culture and multiculturalism.

His article "'The Eternal Triangles of the Law': Toward a Theory of Priorities in Conflicts Involving Remote Parties", 90 Michigan Law Review 95-154 (1991), substantially influenced the case-law and the scholarship in the area of conflicts over rights in both Israel and the United States.
