= Eliezer Schweid =

Israeli philosopher (1929–2022)

- אליעזר שווייד
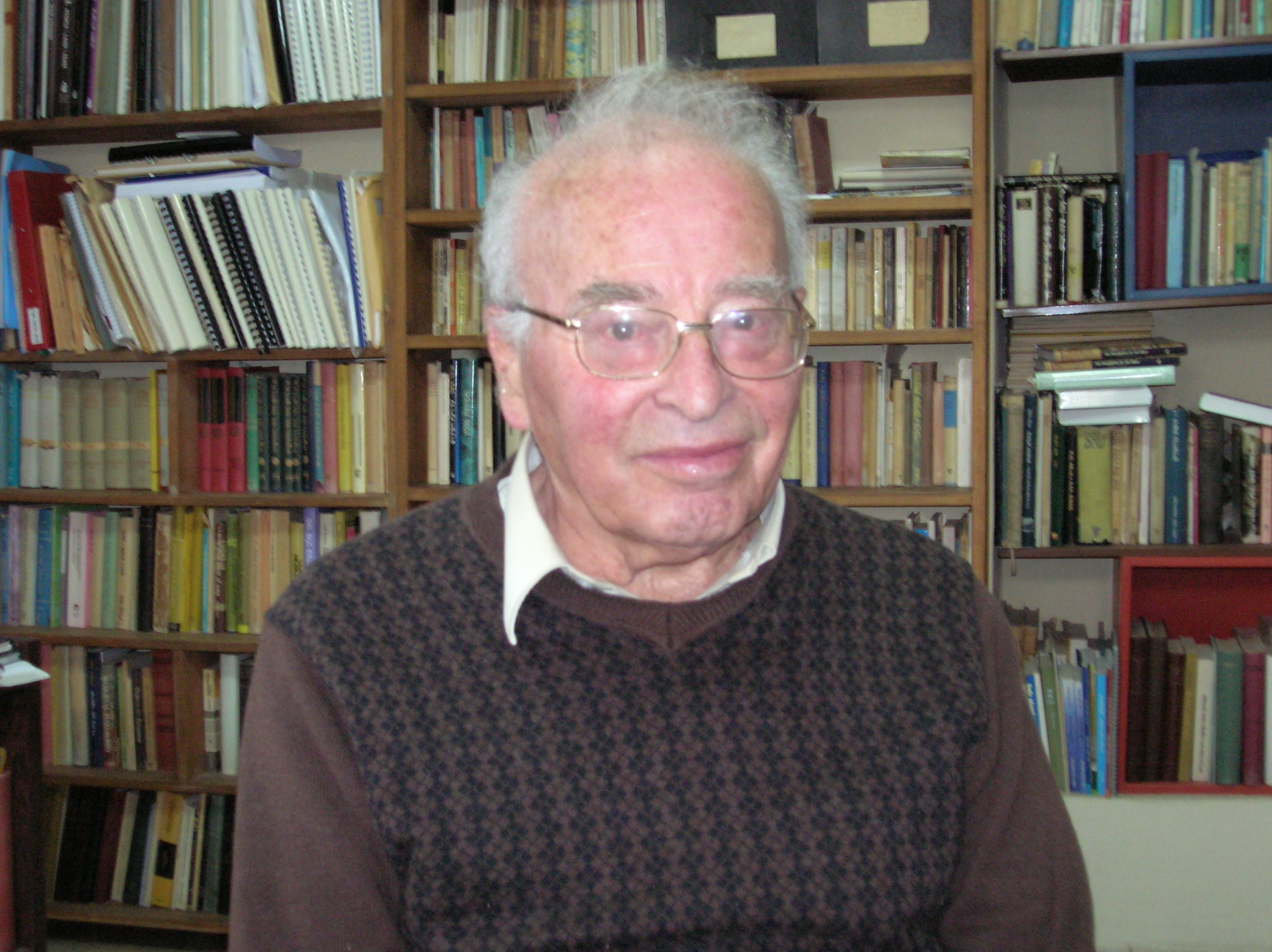
- Schweid in 2008
- Born: 7 September 1929; Jerusalem, Mandatory Palestine
- Died: 18 January 2022 (aged 92)
- Occupations: Professor, Jewish philosopher
- Awards: Israel Prize in Jewish thought (1994)

Academic background
- Education: Hebrew University of Jerusalem

Eliezer Schweid (Hebrew: אליעזר שווייד; 7 September 1929 – 18 January 2022) was an Israeli scholar, writer and Professor of Jewish Philosophy at The Hebrew University of Jerusalem. He was also a fellow of the Jerusalem Center for Public Affairs.

== Biography ==
Eliezer Schweid was born and raised in Jerusalem. His parents were Zvi Yisrael and Osnat Schweid. He served in the Palmah during Israel's War of Independence. He was a founding member of Kibbutz Tzora. He studied at the Hebrew University of Jerusalem and taught there for over thirty years. In 1982, he was designated the John and Golda Cohen Professor of Jewish Philosophy. Schweid taught at Stanford University, the Oxford Centre for Hebrew Studies, Yale University, and the Bet Midrash of the Jewish Theological Seminary in Jerusalem, serving on its Academic Advisory Board.

Schweid died on 18 January 2022, at the age of 92.

== Awards and recognition ==
In 1994, Schweid was awarded the Israel Prize, in Jewish thought.

== Published works ==
- Jewish Identity in Modern Israel: Proceedings on Secular Judaism and Democracy
- The Jewish Experience of Time (2000)
- Wrestling Until Day-Break: Searching for Meaning in the Thinking on the Holocaust (1994)
- Democracy and Halakhah (1994)
- Siddur HaTefilla (2009)
- The Land of Israel: National Home Or Land of Destiny (1985, with Deborah Greniman)
- Judaism and Mysticism According to Gershom Scholem: A Critical Analysis and Programmatic Discussion (1985)
- The Classic Jewish Philosophers: From Saadia Through the Renaissance (Supplements to the Journal of Jewish Thought and Philosophy) (2008, Leonard Levin)

== See also ==
- List of Israel Prize recipients
