= 1972 in Israel =

- Decades: 1950s; 1960s; 1970s; 1980s; 1990s
- See also: History of Israel; Timeline of Israeli history; List of years in Israel

Events in the year 1972 in Israel.

== Incumbents ==
- President of Israel – Zalman Shazar
- Prime Minister of Israel – Golda Meir (Alignment)
- President of the Supreme Court – Shimon Agranat
- Chief of General Staff – David Elazar
- Government of Israel – 15th Government of Israel

== Events ==
- 1 January – David Elazar is appointed as the ninth Chief of Staff of the Israel Defense Forces.
- 27 March – President of Uganda Idi Amin ordered all Israelis to leave Uganda. Although Israel had trained Ugandan paratroopers in the past ten years, Amin decided to break off relationship after forming an alliance with Libya.
- 8 May – The founding of the kibbutz Afik.
- 19 May – Population Census: 3,147,683 inhabitants in Israel.
- 24 October – President of Egypt Anwar Sadat convened a meeting of his armed forces leaders and announced plans to prepare for a limited war with Israel.

=== Israeli–Palestinian conflict ===
The most prominent events related to the Israeli–Palestinian conflict which occurred during 1972 include:

- 15 March – King Hussein of Jordan unveiled his plan for the "United Arab Kingdom", a federation consisting of the existing Hashemite Kingdom of Jordan, and a Palestinian Arab state on Jordan's former territories on the Israeli occupied West Bank, each with their own parliament, united under one monarch. The UAK would be dependent upon a treaty between Jordan and Israel. The PLO and other Arab nations opposed the plan.

Notable Palestinian militant operations against Israeli targets

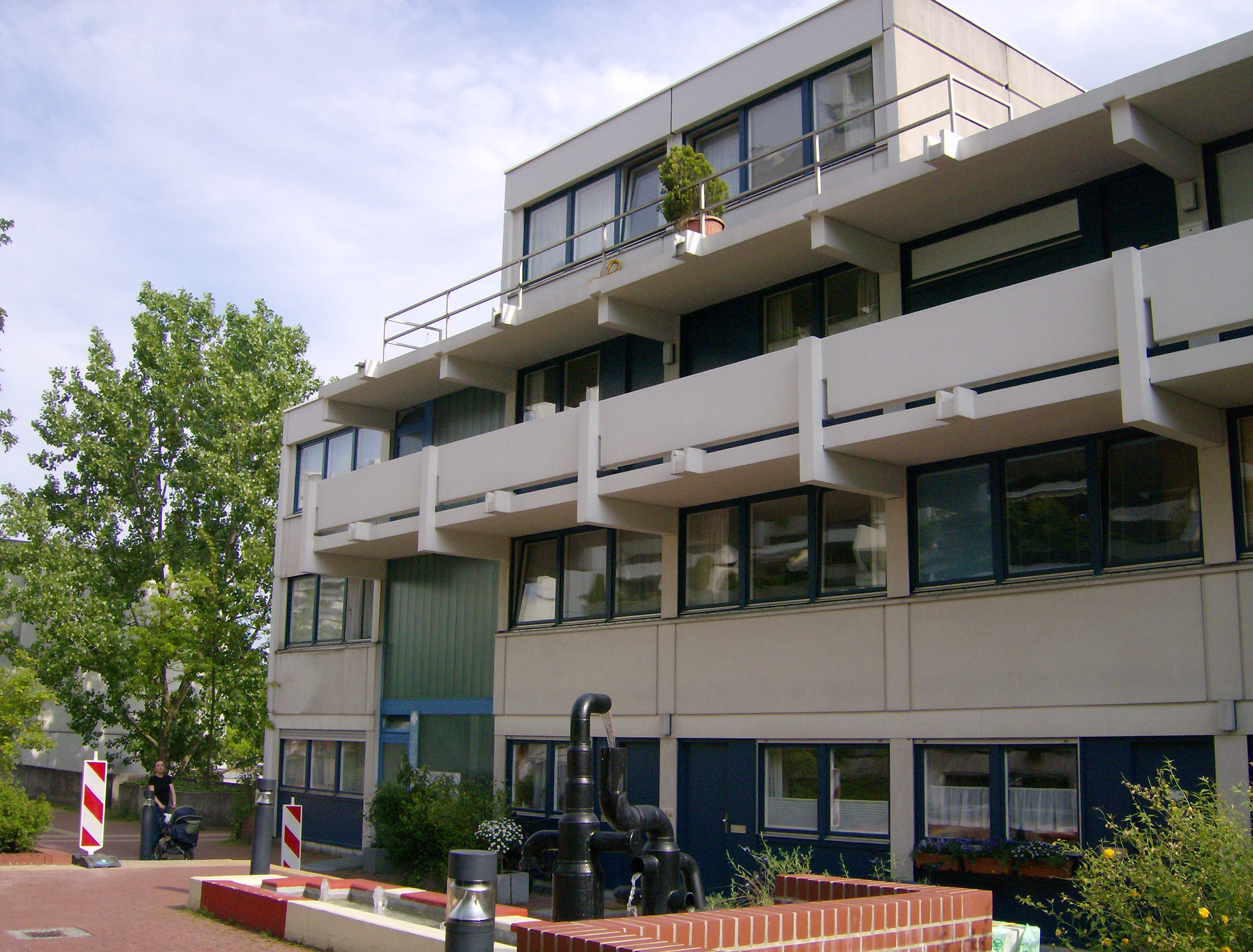
Munich Massacre: the building where the hostage-taking took place. The window of Apartment 1 is to the left of and below the balcony.

The most prominent Palestinian terror attacks committed against Israelis during 1972 include:

- 8 May – Sabena Flight 571 hijacking: Four PLO terrorists hijack an airplane of Sabena Flight 572 carrying 99 passengers and ten crew members en route from Brussels to Tel Aviv. In a mission titled "Operation Isotope", 16 members of Sayeret Matkal pose as refueling and technical personnel and storm the plane, killing the terrorists and releasing the passengers.
- 30 May – Lod Airport massacre: Acting on behalf of the Popular Front for the Liberation of Palestine, three Japanese Red Army members enter the waiting area of Lod Airport near Tel Aviv and fire indiscriminately at airport staff and travelers. 26 people are killed (including 17 tourists from Puerto Rico), and 80 are wounded.
- 5–6 September – Munich Massacre: Eleven Israeli athletes, members of the Israeli Olympic team at the 1972 Summer Olympics in Munich, are murdered after eight members of Black September invade the Olympic Village; five terrorists and one German policeman are also killed in a failed hostage rescue.
- 19 September – A parcel bomb sent to the Israeli Embassy in London kills Ami Shachori, an Israeli attaché at the Israeli Embassy in London. The letter has been attributed to the Palestinian "Black September" militant group.
- 28 December – 1972 Israeli Bangkok Embassy hostage crisis: Members of Black September occupy the Israeli embassy in Bangkok, Thailand, holding twelve hostages. Though their demands are not met, negotiations secure the release of all the hostages and the Black September militants are given safe passage to Cairo.

Notable Israeli military operations against Palestinian militancy targets

The most prominent Israeli military counter-terrorism operations (military campaigns and military operations) carried out against Palestinian militants during 1972 include:

- 8 September – In retaliation for the killing of nine Israeli Olympic athletics, Israel's air force bombed Palestinian strongholds in Syria and Lebanon.
- 16 October – At 10:30 pm in Rome, two agents of Israel's Mossad shot Wael Zwaiter eleven times as he returned to his apartment building. Zwaiter, suspected by Mossad to have been part of the Black September planning for the Munich massacre, was the first person killed as part of Operation Wrath of God.
- 8 December – Dr. Mahmoud Hamshari, the PLO representative in France, was fatally wounded by a bomb, planted near his telephone by agents of Israel's Mossad, in retaliation for his suspected role in the 1972 Munich Massacre. After the explosive had been placed during Hamshari's absence, an agent telephoned him and asked enough questions to confirm his identity. The bomb was then detonated by remote control, possibly by a signal through the telephone line.

=== Unknown dates ===
- The founding of the moshav Bnei Yehuda.
- The founding of the West Bank settlement of Qiryat Arba.

== Notable births ==
- 2 February – Dana International, Israeli singer.
- 10 February – Naor Zion, Israeli stand-up comedian.
- 22 February – Haim Revivo, former Israeli football player and a businessman.
- 12 March – Doron Sheffer, Israeli basketball player.
- 13 March – Reshef Levi, Israeli comedian
- 30 March – Mili Avital, Israeli actress.
- 2 April – Eyal Berkovic, Israeli footballer.
- 26 April – Avi Nimni, Israeli footballer.
- 18 June – Michal Yannai, Israeli actress.
- 4 July – Shira Arad, Israeli film editor and musical supervisor

== Notable deaths ==
- 1 February – Berl Locker (born 1887), Austro-Hungarian-born Zionist activist and Israeli politician.
- 9 February – Yaakov Herzog (born 1921), Irish-born Israeli diplomat.
- 26 February – Yosef Sapir (born 1902), Israeli politician and Knesset member.
- 1 March – Moshe Sneh (born 1909), Russian (Poland)-born Israeli politician and military figure.
- 5 April – Reuven Barkat (born 1906), Russian (Lithuania)-born Israeli politician.
- 19 April – Alexander Penn (born 1906), Russian-born Israeli poet.
- 30 May – Aharon Katzir (born 1914), Russian (Poland)-born Israeli scientist, killed in the Lod Airport massacre.

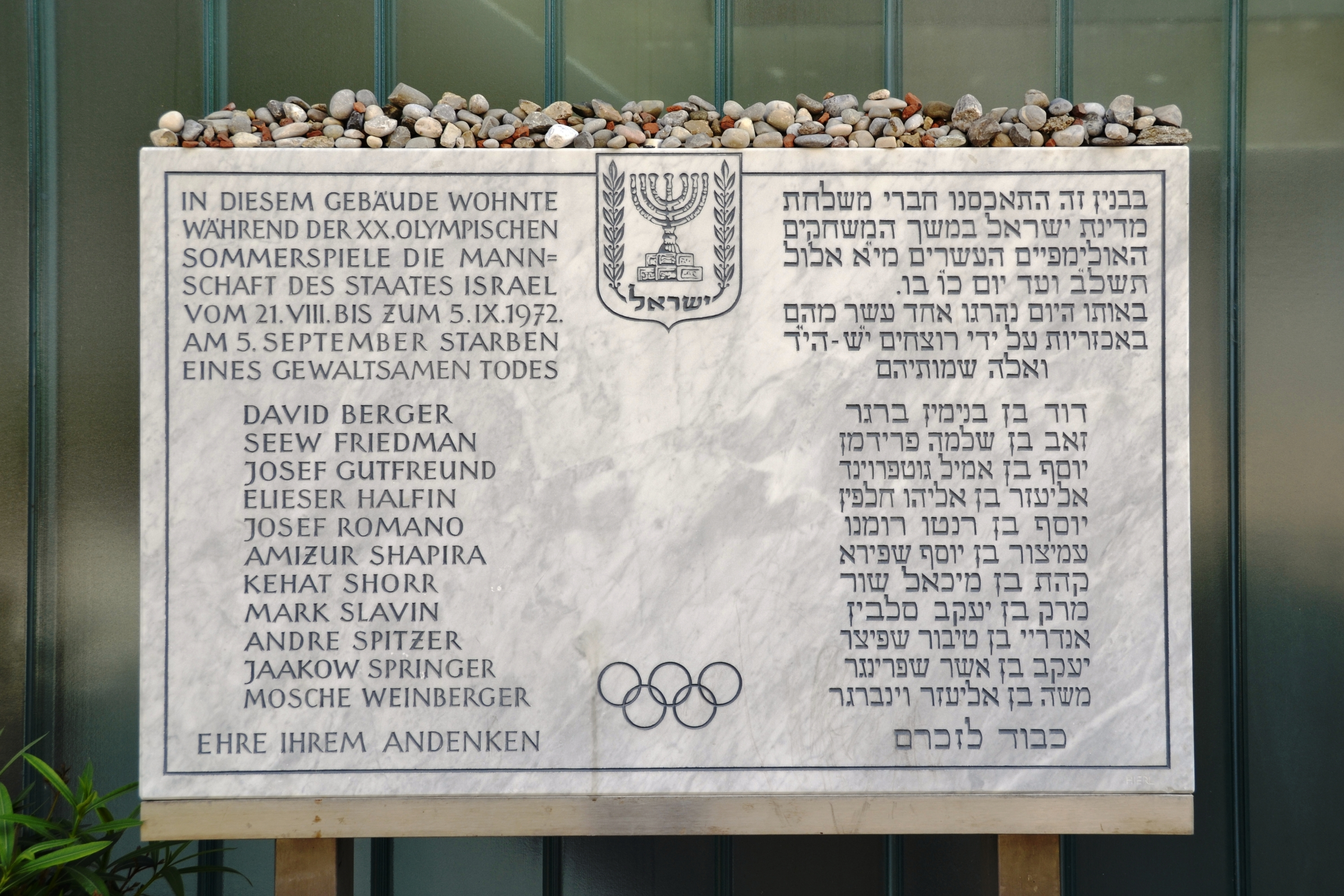
Memorial plaque in front of the Israeli athletes' quarters. The inscription, in German and Hebrew, reads: The team of the State of Israel stayed in this building during the 20th Olympic Summer Games from 21 August – 5 September 1972. On 5 September, [list of victims] died a violent death. Honor to their memory.

- 5 September – (Munich massacre):
  - Yossef Romano (born 1940), Libyan-born Israeli weightlifter.
  - Moshe Weinberg (born 1939), Israeli wrestling coach.
- 6 September – (Munich massacre):
  - David Mark Berger (born 1944), U.S.-born Israeli weightlifter.
  - Ze'ev Friedman (born 1944), Polish-born Israeli weightlifter.
  - Yossef Gutfreund (born 1932), Romanian-born Israeli wrestling referee.
  - Eliezer Halfin (born 1948), Soviet (Latvian)-born Israeli wrestler.
  - Amitzur Shapira (born 1932), Israeli athletics coach.
  - Kehat Shorr (born 1919), Romanian-born Israeli shooting coach.
  - Mark Slavin (born 1954), Soviet (Belarus)-born Israeli wrestler.
  - Andre Spitzer (born 1945), Romanian-born Israeli fencing coach.
  - Yakov Springer (b. c.1921), Polish-born Israeli weightlifting judge.
- Full date unknown – Gershon Shufman (born 1880), Russian (Belarus)-born Israeli writer and painter.

== See also ==
- 1972 in Israeli film
- Israel at the 1972 Summer Olympics
