= Israel at the 1972 Summer Olympics =

- IOC code: ISR
- NOC: Olympic Committee of Israel

in Munich
- Competitors: 15 in 7 sports
- Flag bearer: Henry Herscovici
- Medals: Gold 0 Silver 0 Bronze 0 Total 0

Summer Olympics appearances (overview)
- 1952; 1956; 1960; 1964; 1968; 1972; 1976; 1980; 1984; 1988; 1992; 1996; 2000; 2004; 2008; 2012; 2016; 2020; 2024; 2028

Israel competed at the 1972 Summer Olympics in Munich, West Germany, which began on August 26. On September 5 and 6, in the Munich massacre, 11 members of the Israeli delegation—5 athletes, 2 referees, and 4 coaches—were taken hostage by Black September Organization terrorists and murdered, two initially and the rest later.

== Munich massacre ==
On September 5, in the second week of the Olympics, eight Black September terrorists led by Luttif Afif gained entry to the Olympic Village in Munich. They entered the two-story apartment building at Connollystraße 31, the residence of the Israeli, Hong Kong, and Uruguay Olympic delegations, through an unlocked front door.

Yossef Gutfreund, a wrestling referee, was awakened by a faint scratching noise at the door of Apartment 1, which housed the Israeli coaches and officials. Investigating, he saw the door begin to open and masked men with guns on the other side. Shouting a warning to his sleeping roommates, he threw his 135 kg (300 lb) weight against the door. This gave weightlifting coach Tuvia Sokolovsky time to escape through a window.

Wrestling coach Moshe Weinberg fought the intruders, but they shot him through the cheek and forced him to help them. He led them past Apartment 2, lying and telling them that the residents were not Israelis, to Apartment 3, where the gunmen captured six wrestlers and weightlifters. Weinberg might have hoped that the strong men would have a better chance of fighting the attackers, but they were all surprised in their sleep.

As the athletes were marched to the coaches' apartment, the wounded Weinberg attacked the gunmen again, enabling one of his wrestlers, Gad Tsobari, to escape, but was shot dead. Weightlifter Yossef Romano, a veteran of the 1967 Six-Day War, also attacked and wounded one of the intruders before being shot; he slowly bled to death.

Shaul Ladany, a Holocaust survivor housed in Apartment 2, had already competed in the 50-kilometer walk; he got away by jumping off a balcony. The gunmen were left with nine hostages:

- Gutfreund
- shooting coach Kehat Shorr
- track and field coach Amitzur Shapira
- fencing coach Andre Spitzer
- weightlifting judge Yakov Springer
- wrestler Eliezer Halfin
- wrestler Mark Slavin
- weightlifter David Berger
- weightlifter Ze'ev Friedman

Tense negotiations went on for two days. Finally the authorities pretended to agree to let them leave for Cairo on September 6 on a Boeing 727, all the while planning to set up an ambush. However, the ambush was botched, and all of the hostages and five of the terrorists were killed at the airport; the other three were captured.

== Results ==
Name	Sport	Event	Placing	Performance
Shaul Ladany	Athletics	Men's 50 km walk	19	4:24:38.6 (also entered for 20 km walk, but did not start)
Esther Shahamorov	Athletics	Women's 100 m	Semifinal (5th)	11.49
Esther Shahamorov	Athletics	Women's 100 m hurdles	Semifinal	Did not start (left Munich before the semifinal)
Dan Alon	Fencing	Men's foil	Second round	W5–L5 (1R 3-2, 2R 2-3)
Yehuda Weisenstein	Fencing	Men's foil	Second round	W2–L8 (1R 2-3, 2R 0-5)
Yair Michaeli	Sailing	Flying Dutchman	23	28-22-22-19-25-19-DNS = 171 pts (left Kiel before 7th race)
Itzhak Nir	Sailing	Flying Dutchman	23	28-22-22-19-25-19-DNS = 171 pts (left Kiel before 7th race)
Henry Hershkowitz	Shooting	50 metre rifle prone	23	593/600
Henry Hershkowitz	Shooting	50 metre rifle three positions	46	1114/1200
Zelig Shtroch	Shooting	50 metre rifle prone	57	589/600
Shlomit Nir	Swimming	Women's 100 m breaststroke	Heats (8th)	1:20.90
Shlomit Nir	Swimming	Women's 200 m breaststroke	Heats (6th)	2:53.60
David Berger	Weightlifting	Light-heavyweight <82.5 kg	—	J:132.5 C:122.5 S:— T:—
Ze'ev Friedman	Weightlifting	Bantamweight <56 kg	12	J:102.5 C:102.5 S:125 T:330
Yossef Romano	Weightlifting	Middleweight <75 kg	—	Retired injured on third attempt to press 137.5 kg
Gad Tsobari	Wrestling	Freestyle — Light Flyweight <48 kg	Group stage	0W–2L
Eliezer Halfin	Wrestling	Freestyle — Lightweight <68 kg	Group stage	1W–2L
Mark Slavin	Wrestling	Greco-Roman — Middleweight <82 kg	—	Did not start (taken hostage before his scheduled event)

== Referees ==
The following nominated referees and judges were in the delegation:

- Yossef Gutfreund — wrestling
- Yakov Springer – weightlifting

== Coaches and officials ==
The following coaches and officials were in the delegation:

- Shmuel Lalkin — Chef De Mission
- Micha Shamban — presumably deputy of Chef De Mission
- Eliyahu Friedlender - sailing team manager
- Amitzur Shapira — athletics coach
- Kehat Shorr — shooting coach
- Tuvia Sokolovsky — weightlifting coach
- Andre Spitzer — fencing coach
- Moshe Weinberg — wrestling coach
- Itzhac Aldubi - chairman of ASA (Academic Sport Association)
- Werner Nachmann
- Duel Parrack
- Josef Szwec
- Kurt Weigl
