= Mark Slavin =

Israeli wrestler and Munich massacre victim

- מרק סלבין
- Pronunciation: /mɑɹk; ˈslɑː.vən/
- Born: Марк Яковлевич Славин; 31 January 1954; Minsk, Byelorussian SSR, USSR
- Died: 6 September 1972 (aged 18); Fürstenfeldbruck, West Germany
- Cause of death: Terrorist attack
- Body discovered: Fürstenfeldbruck Air Base
- Burial place: Kiryat Shaul Cemetery
- Citizenship: Israel, USSR
- Education: Shefayim Ulpam, Institute of Physical Education
- Occupation: Greco-Roman Wrestler
- Years active: 1971–1972
- Known for: Being hostage in the Munich Massacre
- Father: Yakov Slavin

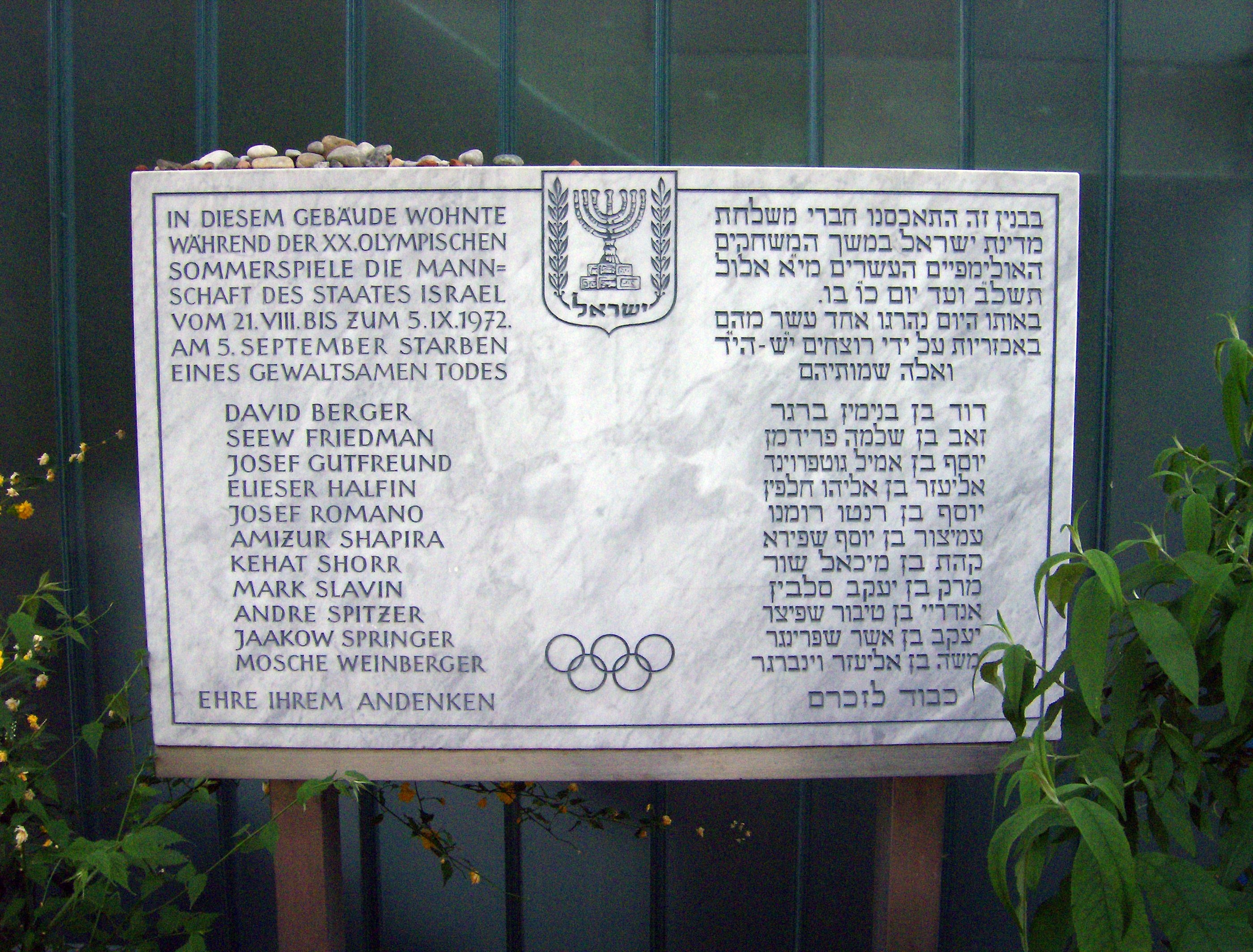
Plaque in front of the Israeli athletes' quarters commemorating the victims of the Munich massacre.

Mark Slavin (Hebrew: מרק סלבין, Russian: Марк Славин; 31 January 1954 – 6 September 1972) was an Israeli Olympic Greco-Roman wrestler and victim of the Munich massacre at the 1972 Summer Olympics.

He was the youngest of the victims at the age of 18. He was taken hostage with eight other Israeli athletes. Slavin was shot by machine gun fire in a helicopter during a botched rescue attempt.

Slavin was born in Minsk, Belarus SSR, and had taken up wrestling as a youth to defend himself against antisemitic attacks. Slavin soon became noted as a talented wrestler, and won the Soviet Greco-Roman wrestling middleweight junior championship in 1971. Slavin had moved to Israel just four months before the Olympic games and he joined Hapoel Tel Aviv and the Israeli Olympic Team. The 1972 Olympics was due to be his first international competition for Israel, and Slavin had been considered Israel's most likely medal winner at the Munich games.

Slavin had been staying in Unit 3 at 31 Connollystraße in the Olympic Village, with fellow wrestlers Gad Tsobari and Eliezer Halfin, and weightlifters David Berger, Yossef Romano and Ze'ev Friedman. Slavin had been due to make his Olympic debut on the day heavily armed Palestinian terrorists broke into the Olympic Village and captured him while the Olympic athletes were still asleep.
