= Yusuf Nazzal =

Palestinian militant leader (1937–1972)

- Born: 1937
- Died: 6 September 1972 (aged 34–35); Fürstenfeldbruck, West Germany
- Cause of death: Shot dead by law enforcement
- Other name: Tony
- Organization: Black September Organization

Details
- Country: Germany
- Location: Munich Olympic Village
- Target: Israeli Olympic team

Yusuf Nazzal (1937 – 6 September 1972) (code name "Tony") was the second-in-command of eight members of the Palestinian Black September Organisation that invaded 31 Connollystraße in the Munich Olympic Village on 5 September 1972, and took nine members of the Israeli Olympic team hostage after two members, weightlifter Yossef Romano and wrestling coach Moshe Weinberg, were killed in the initial takeover. Television images broadcast during the hostage crisis show Nazzal frequently, seemingly always smoking, wearing sunglasses, an open-neck red shirt, and a cowboy hat, which led him to be identified as the 'Cowboy'. According to author Serge Groussard, Nazzal "liked to be called Guevara".

== Early life ==
According to Abu Daoud, Nazzal was a young officer in the Al-'Asifah, the armed wing of Fatah, who towards the end of 1971 had been based in Nabatieh, southern Lebanon, where he was involved in conducting operations across the border in Israel. Nazzal had fought in Amman in 1970 after Jordan's expulsion of the PLO, and in the battles of Jerash and Ajlun in July 1971. Described by Daoud as a "very good fighter", Nazzal had purportedly begged Abu Iyad to "organize something, somewhere" in retaliation against Israel after deadly Israeli air raids in southern Lebanon. Nazzal then moved to West Germany to study. According to Simon Reeve, Nazzal worked for a Munich oil company.

== Munich massacre ==
=== Days before the attack ===
Nazzal is reported to have flown to Libya on the 11 or 12 August for "intensive training" in preparation for the attack on the Israeli quarters. In the weeks prior to the attack, Nazzal, the leader of the assault, Luttif Afif, and Abu Daoud, carried out reconnaissance of the Olympic Village by pretending to be Brazilian tourists, managing to gain access after Daoud struck up a rapport with a guard stationed at one of the entrances. Daoud claims that on this visit, Nazzal, Afif, and himself were able to get inside 31 Connollystraße after being accompanied by an unsuspecting Israeli female, which resulted in their obtaining crucial information, such as the layout of the building, how many athletes were in each apartment, and where they slept. Simon Reeve states that both Nazzal and Afif were able to gain temporary employment in the Olympic Village, with Nazzal working as a cook. Afif and Nazzal would sit playing chess and observing the comings and goings of athletes in and around 31 Connollystraße in preparation for the attack. Nazzal was found inside 31 Connollystraße apartments at 8:00 am on the day prior to the attack by Uruguayan official Luis Friedman. Reportedly, Nazzal shyly told Friedman in English that someone in the building occasionally gave him fruit; Friedman then gave him all the fruit he could carry.

=== Fürstenfeldbruck ===
Upon landing at Fürstenfeldbruck Air Base, Afif and Nazzal each left their Bell UH-1 Iroquois helicopters and walked slowly over to inspect the Lufthansa Boeing 727, parked just 150 metres away on the tarmac apron. While Nazzal waited outside, Afif went inside to check the plane. Finding it empty, the two immediately suspected a trap and jogged back, shouting warnings to their six fellow fedayeen guarding the two helicopters containing the Israeli athletes. As they ran, the area lit up and police commander George Wolf, lying next to three sharpshooters on the roof of the control tower, instructed them to open fire. Two shots rang out, hitting two terrorists guarding the helicopters; Ahmed Chic Thaa and Afif Ahmed Hamid both fell to the ground, though only one was killed outright. Another shot hit Nazzal in the leg, making him collapse on the tarmac. One of his fellow fedayeen, eighteen-year-old Jamal Al-Gashey, was shot through the wrist.

Despite being wounded in the exchange of gunfire, Nazzal managed to escape across the airfield to a parking lot, pursued by police, dogs, and West German border guards. He managed to elude them for another hour before being cornered and shot dead around 1:30 am, though not before shooting a West German border guard in the neck.

== Aftermath ==
The bodies of Nazzal and his four compatriots were handed over to Libya and after a procession of 30,000 people from Martyrs' Square, Tripoli, they were buried in the Sidi Munaidess Cemetery.

== In popular culture ==
Nazzal has been portrayed by the actors Djamchid "Jim" Soheili in the 1976 television film 21 Hours at Munich and Merik Tadros in Steven Spielberg's 2005 film Munich.

== See also ==
- Mossad assassinations following the Munich massacre
- List of hostage crises
