= Khalid Jawad =

Palestinian militant (1954–1972)

Khalid Jawad (1954 – 6 September 1972) was a Palestinian militant and one of eight Black September militants that invaded the Israeli quarters at the Munich Olympic Village during the 1972 Munich Olympic Games, taking hostage nine members of the Israeli Olympic delegation after killing Israeli wrestling coach Moshe Weinberg and weightlifter Yossef Romano in the initial takeover. It has been suggested that Jawad was wearing the ski mask featured in images that became iconic of this atrocity.

== Early life ==
Jawad was born in 1954. He had grown up in the Chatila refugee camp in Lebanon with several of his fellow fedayeen, even playing on the same football team as some of them and was described as "soccer mad". He had lived in West Germany for two years with his brother Farud but was sent home because "he couldn't fit in". He was subsequently recruited for the Munich operation.

== Preparation for the attack at the Munich Olympics ==
Upon being chosen for the Munich operation, Jawad undertook training. He told his brother that he was "going to play football in Syria." On his return, however, his family noticed marks on his back as if he'd been wearing a backpack. When asked about where he had been, Jawad persisted in telling them that he had been playing football, but instructed them, not to "tell anyone." A few weeks later and a month before the start of the 1972 Summer Olympics, Jawad and the other chosen fedayeen flew to Tripoli, Libya to undertake a month's advanced training.

== Death at Fürstenfeldbruck Air Base ==
Upon arriving in one of two helicopters with the Israeli athletes at Fürstenfeldbruck Air Base, the fedayeen became engaged in a firefight with five German police sharpshooters positioned around the airfield. During the battle, Jawad made a dash across the pitch-black airfield away from the back of the helicopters and ran unwittingly straight towards a garden where a German sharpshooter was positioned. The sharpshooter fired several shots from a distance of five metres, hitting Jawad in the face and shooting him a further three times as he was falling. Jawad was not killed instantly, however; the sharpshooter reported hearing the terrorist "moaning and gasping for breath several times", while helicopter pilot Gunnar Ebel, who had sought cover next to the prone sharpshooters during the opening stage of the gun battle, reported hearing a "gurgling" sound from Jawad as he died.

== Aftermath ==
Jawad's family only found out about his death after a photograph in a local newspaper showed his corpse with a bullet through his face.

His body and those of his four fedayeen compatriots were handed over to Libya and after a procession of 30,000 people from Martyrs' Square, Tripoli, they were buried in the Sidi Munaidess Cemetery.

== See also ==
- Palestine Liberation Organization
- Mossad assassinations following the Munich massacre
- List of hostage crises
