= David Berger National Memorial =

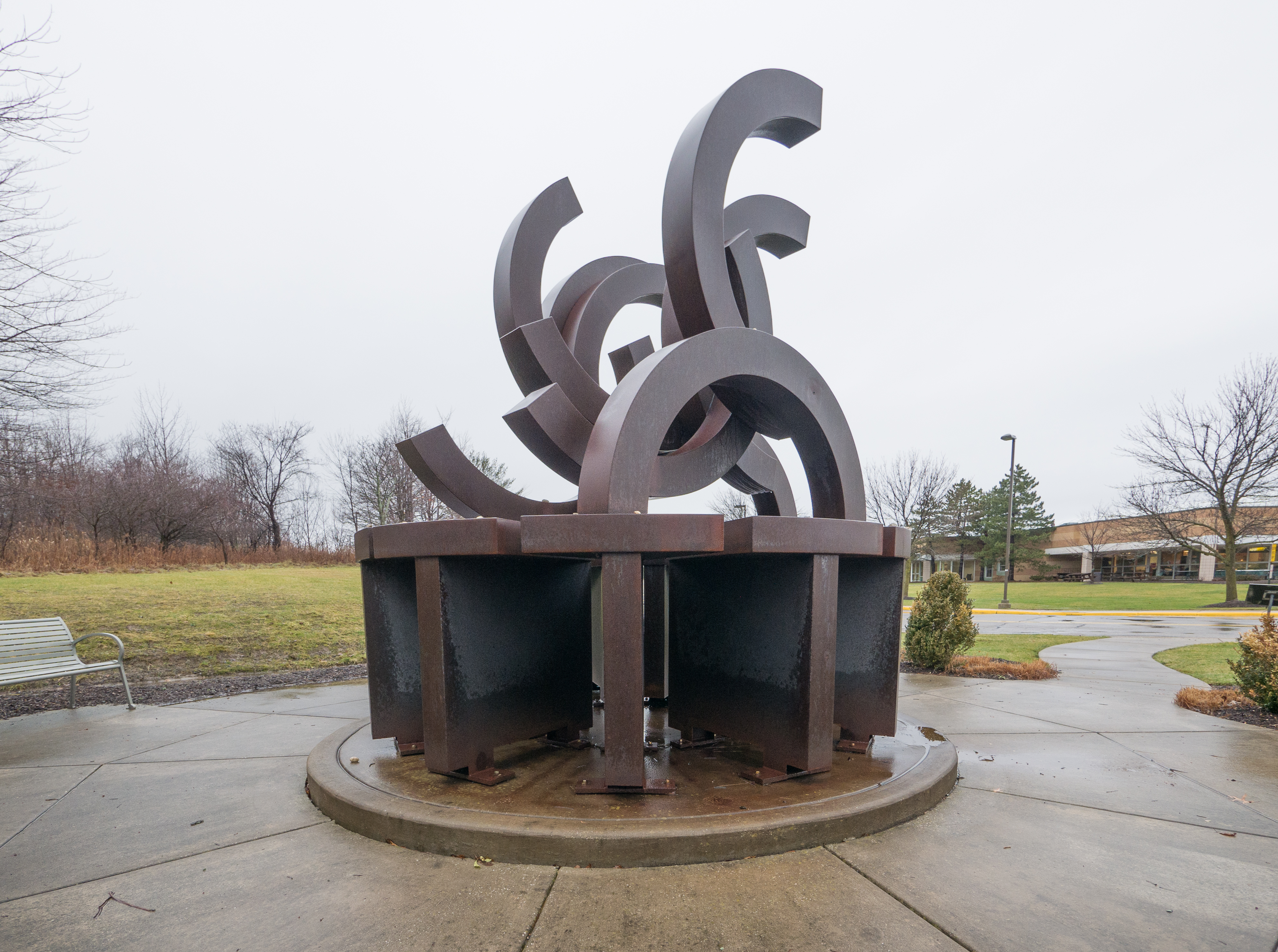

- Location within Ohio Location within the United States
- Location: Beachwood, Ohio, USA
- Coordinates: 41.474175°N 81.49183081°W
- Established: March 5, 1980
- Governing body: National Park Service
- Website: David Berger National Memorial

David Berger National Memorial honors the memory of David Mark Berger, a 28-year-old U.S.-born Israeli weightlifter who was one of 11 Israeli athletes killed by Palestinian terrorists in the Munich massacre at the 1972 Summer Olympics. The memorial is dedicated to his memory and to the memory of the ten other athletes who were killed.

The black steel sculpture, a design of broken Olympic rings, is meant to symbolize the interruption of the Munich games by the tragic events, and the eleven segments on which the rings rest represent each athlete whose life was taken. The sculpture was fabricated by Romanian-born David E. Davis.

The sculpture was installed on the front lawn of the Mayfield Jewish Community Center at 3505 Mayfield Road in Cleveland Heights, Ohio in 1975. The national memorial designation was authorized on March 5, 1980. Because of the demolition of the Mayfield Center in 2005, the memorial was moved to the Mandel Jewish Community Center at 26001 South Woodland Road in Beachwood, Ohio. Although formally under the authority of Cuyahoga Valley National Park, maintenance of the memorial is handled by the community center.

== See also ==
- List of national memorials of the United States
