= Afif Ahmed Hamid =

Black September militant

Afif Ahmed Hamid (died 6 September 1972) was a Palestinian militant and one of eight Black September members that invaded the Israeli quarters at the Munich Olympic Village during the 1972 Munich Olympic Games, taking hostage nine members of the Israeli Olympic delegation after killing Israeli wrestling coach Moshe Weinberg and weightlifter Yossef Romano in the initial takeover.

== Early life ==
Hamid grew up in the Chatila refugee camp in Beirut, Lebanon. He joined Fatah in 1968 and spent a year studying in Germany before returning to Lebanon in 1971.

== Preparation for the attack ==
Hamid told his mother that he was going back to Germany to study for approximately two and a half months.

== Death at Fürstenfeldbruck Air Base ==
Upon arriving in one of two helicopters carrying the captive Israeli athletes at Fürstenfeldbruck Air Base, a firefight ensued with five German police sharpshooters positioned around the airfield, and Hamid was killed in its initial stages. In photographs taken after the event, he can be seen lying facedown on the tarmac in a pool of blood.

== Aftermath ==
The bodies of Hamid and his comrades were handed over to the government of Libya. After a procession of 30,000 people from Tripoli's Martyrs' Square, they were buried at the Sidi Munaidess Cemetery.

== See also ==
- Palestine Liberation Organization
- Mossad assassinations following the Munich massacre
- List of hostage crises
