= Hapoel Tel Aviv =

Sport Club in Israel

Hapoel Tel Aviv הפועל תל אביב
- Company type: Hapoel
- Genre: Sports
- Founded: 1920s
- Headquarters: Tel Aviv, Israel

Hapoel Tel Aviv (Hebrew: הפועל תל אביב) is a sports club in Israel, founded in the 1920s, and part of the Hapoel association. It runs several sports clubs and teams in Tel Aviv which have competed in a variety of sports over the years, such as football, basketball, weightlifting and others. Hapoel Tel Aviv is well known for its red uniforms.

== Notable members ==
- Michael Beilin (born 1976), Olympic Greco-Roman wrestler
- Vered "Vardush" Buskila (born 1983), Olympic sailor
- Gil Cohen (born 1992), Olympic sailor
- Maayan Davidovich (born 1988), Olympic windsurfer
- Anat Fabrikant (born 1975), Olympic competitive sailor
- Yehoshua Feigenbaum (born 1947), Olympic football player
- Udi Gal (born 1979), Olympic sailor and world championship bronze medalist
- Max Geller (born 1971), Olympic wrestler
- Eliezer Halfin (1948–72) Olympic wrestler; killed in Munich Massacre
- Michal Hein (born 1968), Olympic windsurfer
- Gideon Kliger (born 1980), Olympic sailor and world championship bronze medalist
- Mark Slavin (1954–72), Olympic Greco-Roman wrestler; killed in Munich Massacre
- Nik Zagranitchni (born 1969), Olympic wrestler

== Notable coaches ==
- Moshe Weinberg (1939–72), wrestling coach; killed in the Munich Massacre

== Teams ==
- Hapoel Tel Aviv F.C. – football
- Hapoel Tel Aviv B.C. – basketball
- Hapoel Tel Aviv (handball) – handball
- Hapoel Tel Aviv W. – weightlifting
