= David Berger (weightlifter) =

Israeli weightlifter

- דיוויד מארק ברגר
- David Berger in 1970
- Born: May 24, 1944; Cleveland, Ohio, U.S.
- Died: September 6, 1972 (aged 28); Fürstenfeldbruck, West Germany
- Cause of death: Terrorist attack
- Body discovered: Fürstenfeldbruck Air Base
- Resting place: Mayfield Cemetery Cleveland Heights, Ohio
- Monuments: David Berger National Memorial, Beachwood, Ohio
- Education: Tulane University (BA); Columbia University (MBA, JD)
- Occupations: Lawyer, Weightlifter
- Parents: Benjamin Berger (father); Dorothy Berger (mother)

David Mark Berger (Hebrew: דיוויד מארק ברגר; May 24, 1944 – September 6, 1972) was an American and Israeli Olympic weightlifter, and one of the 11 Israeli Olympians taken hostage and killed by the Palestinian group Black September during the Munich massacre at the 1972 Summer Olympics. Born and raised in the United States, Berger was a lawyer by education and had emigrated to Israel after taking part in the 1969 Maccabiah Games, where he won a gold medal.

== Early life and athletic success ==
David Mark Berger was born in Cleveland, Ohio, on May 24, 1944. His mother was Dorothy Berger, (née Davidson), and his father was Benjamin Berger, who was a well known physician. A high school honors student as well as an athlete, Berger graduated from Shaker Heights High School in 1962. He attended Tulane University in New Orleans from 1962 to 1966 where he was an honors student. While studying at Tulane, he continued weightlifting training at the New Orleans Athletic Club. As a junior at Tulane, he won the NCAA weightlifting title in the 148-pound class. Berger earned a bachelor's degree in psychology from Tulane in 1966. He went on to enroll in a combined MBA-JD program at Columbia University in New York, from which he graduated in 1969. While working toward his degrees, Berger continued to devote time to weightlifting, training at the McBurney YMCA in Midtown Manhattan. During his time in New York, Berger competed in the middleweight division. In 1968, competing as a middleweight, he finished fourth in the U.S. Olympic trials. His father, Benjamin, was once quoted as saying, "I used to tell him ‘You may not be the best weightlifter in the world, but you’re certainly the smartest!’"

After winning a gold medal in the middleweight weight-lifting contest in the 1969 Maccabiah Games, Berger emigrated to Israel, intending to open a law office in Tel Aviv after completing his compulsory military service. Berger continued competing in weightlifting, but moved up in body weight to the lightheavy class. He won a silver medal at the 1971 Asian Weightlifting Championships, and achieved a long time dream when he was chosen to represent Israel as a member of the 1972 Israeli Olympic team. In late August of that year, Berger flew to Munich with his teammates. On September 2, 1972, Berger competed, but couldn't record a valid jerk which omitted him from the final ranking.

== Death ==
Early on the morning of September 5, 1972, Palestinian terrorists took Berger and his five roommates hostage, after having earlier broken into the Olympic Village and seized six officials in another apartment as well as wounding wrestling coach Moshe Weinberg in the face. While the athletes were being moved to the first apartment, Weinberg grappled with the intruders, allowing flyweight wrestler Gad Tsobari to escape but resulting in Weinberg’s death by gunfire. As the remaining hostages and terrorists entered the officials’ apartment, weightlifter Yossef Romano also attempted to overpower the intruders. Romano was cut nearly in half by automatic fire (his corpse was left all day at the feet of the hostages, who were tied to beds), and Berger was shot in his left shoulder, a wound seen by German officials later in the day. It is believed that Berger, being physically one of the largest of the hostages, was also beaten in order to intimidate the other hostages.

After all-day negotiations, the terrorists and their tied-up hostages were transferred from the Olympic Village via helicopter to Fürstenfeldbruck airbase outside of Munich, where the terrorists believed they would be flown to a friendly Arab nation. Instead, the German border guards and Munich police attempted to ambush the terrorists and free the hostages. After a two-hour gunfight, one of the terrorists turned on the helicopter in which Berger was sitting and sprayed it with machine-gun fire. The other three hostages in the helicopter were killed instantly, but somehow Berger only received two non-lethal wounds in his legs. However, the terrorist then detonated a hand grenade inside the helicopter, causing a huge explosion and fire. An autopsy found that Berger had died of smoke inhalation. The five hostages in the other helicopter were all shot to death by another terrorist.

While the 10 other Israeli Olympians were flown to and buried in Israel, David Berger's body was returned to the United States on an Air Force jet personally ordered by President Richard Nixon. Berger is buried at Mayfield Cemetery in Cleveland Heights, Ohio.

== Memorials ==
- David Berger National Memorial in Beachwood, Ohio, honors the memory of Berger and his fallen teammates.
- In 2002, New Orleans renamed "Avenger Field," located in Audubon Park, "David Berger - Avenger Field" in memory of Berger and the other victims of terrorism."
- Berger, along with the other ten members of the 1972 Israeli Olympic team killed in Munich, was inducted into the Philadelphia Jewish Sports Hall of Fame.
- The Shaker Heights High School weight room is named after Berger.
- The David Berger Memorial Weightlifting Tournament is held every year at the Lost Battalion Hall in Rego Park, Queens, New York
- David Berger AZA #1823 is a BBYO chapter in Cleveland, Ohio, named in honor of him.
- David Berger AZA #2059 is a BBYO chapter named for him in Dallas, Texas.
- David Berger is also the name of a street in Ashkelon, Israel.
- David Berger mural of the Shaker Heights High School

== See also ==
- List of select Jewish weightlifters
