= Carmel Eliash =

Israeli politician

- כרמל אליאש
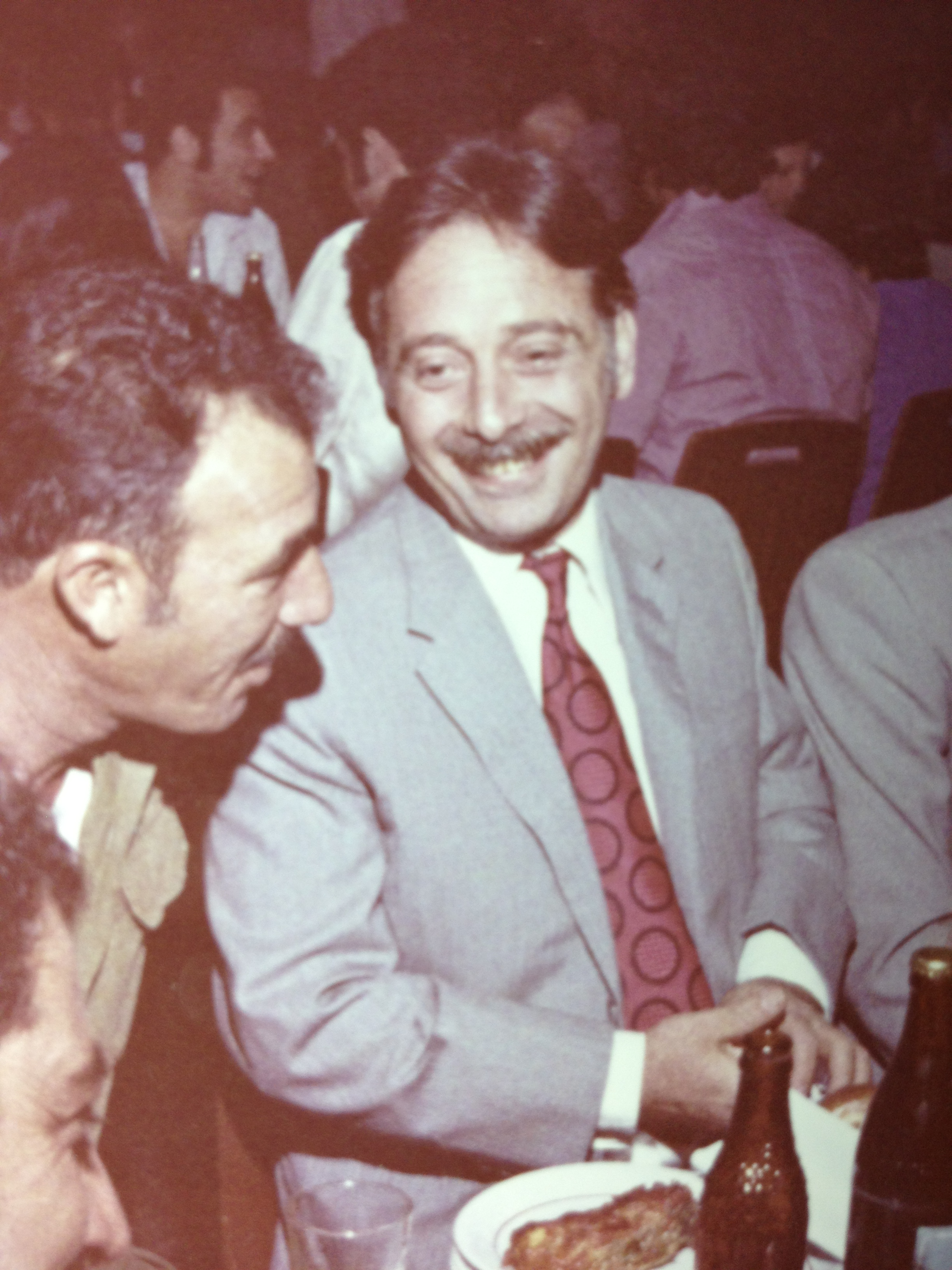
- Carmel Eliash

Mayor of Tirat Carmel
- In office 25 November 1969 – 8 May 1973
- Preceded by: Nissim Honen
- Succeeded by: Abraham Alkalay

Personal details
- Born: 24 December 1933 Baghdad, Iraq
- Died: 8 May 1973 (aged 39) Haifa, Israel
- Party: Gush Herut-Liberalim
- Spouse: Badria Eliash

Military service
- Allegiance: Israel
- Branch/service: Nahal Brigade
- Years of service: 1952–1956
- Rank: first Sergeant (Rav Samal)

Carmel Edward Eliash (Hebrew: כרמל אדוארד אליאש; born 24 December 1933 – 8 May 1973) was an Israeli politician, head of the Union of Local Authorities in Israel (ULAI), and mayor of Tirat Carmel.

== Biography ==
Edward (later Carmel) Eliash was born in Baghdad. His father was an Austrian doctor who arrived in Iraq with a League of Nations delegation. In 1949, he joined an underground Zionist movement, and made Aliyah to Israel illegally through Iran.

He joined Kibbutz Ramat David and became a member of Mapam. In 1950, he served as the representative of the Kibbutz Movement at the "Sha'ar Ha-'aliyah" ("The Gate of Aliyah") immigration camp. Afterwards he served as the representative in Atlit.

In 1952, he was drafted into the Israel Defense Forces and stationed at a base close to Tirat Carmel, then a major absorption center for immigrants from Iraq, Morocco and Romania. Eliash met his future wife Badria in Tirat Carmel and decided to settle there permanently.

Upon his release from the army he worked in security at a local factory and then moved to Autocars Co., one of the founding car industries in Israel, which manufactured the Susita, Carmel and Sabra. He persuaded the company owner Yitzhak Shovinsky to build a factory in Tirat Carmel, which became an important source of employment for the local inhabitants.

== Political career ==
In 1955, Eliash was elected secretary of the HaNoar HaOved VeHaLomed youth movement and a year later became secretary of the Mapai party in Tirat Carmel. In 1960, the Mapai party offered Eliash the top slot in the local council elections.

In May 1965, the liberal party joined the Herut party, creating the Gahal Party. Eliash headed the Gahal list for city council elections in Tirat Carmel. In December 1965, he was elected as a council member and served as the Deputy mayor of Tirat Carmel. Later, he served as Gahal's representative in the Histadrut.

In November 1968 he was chosen by Gahal as the party's candidate for mayor in the upcoming municipal elections. Upon the death of Prime Minister Levi Eshkol in February 1969, the elections for the 7th Knesset were brought forward to October that year. Eliash turned down the opportunity to run on the Gahal list for the Knesset.

== Mayor of Tirat Carmel ==
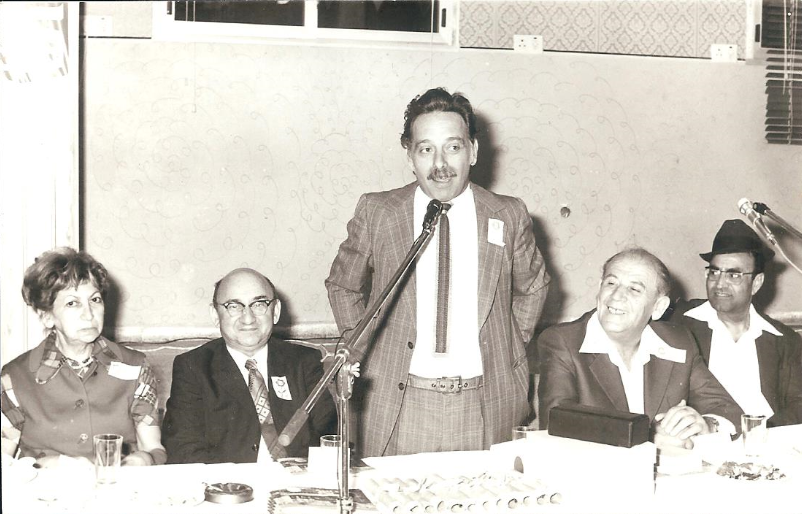
Eliash at the City Council meeting

The Tirat Carmel local elections were on 25 November 1969, a month after the Knesset elections. Eliash was elected mayor. He left his studies at the University of Haifa to assume office. He was also elected chairman of the Union of Local Authorities. Eliash instituted an "open door" policy in his office, meeting with thousands of citizens while serving as mayor.

In January 1971 Eliash met with the Prime Minister Golda Meir in order to find a solution for the severe housing shortage in Tirat Carmel. Following this meeting, the Ministry of Construction was ordered to speed up construction and prepare vacant apartments for immediate entry. In response to continued delays, Eliash ordered 90 families to move into the vacant apartments. The Israel Police were summoned to evict them. Golda Meir intervened and the necessary permits were obtained.

In September 1972, he escorted the Israeli delegation to the 1972 Summer Olympics, in which the Israeli athletes were murdered. On 6 September 1972, after the massacre, he suffered a heart attack during the public memorial for the slain athletes and slain German police officer shot dead in the rescue effort. Having suffered the loss of his cousin, Moshe Weinberg, as one of the first Israelis to be murdered at the Israeli housing unit, he refused to be hospitalized in a German hospital and was flown back to Israel for medical aid.

During his tenure, the Shifman high school was established. Eliash inaugurated a long school day from kindergarten to high school, which set a precedent in Israel. Furthermore, a scholarship fund was raised for academic studies for the disadvantaged youth, a communal and youth center was opened, and the first public garden was planted, spreading across 15 acres. Youth clubs for Betar and Bnei Akiva were established, a sports center with a swimming pool, a main road was paved to the entrance of the city, and a monument was built in memory of the Israeli casualties of war that were originally from the Tirat Carmel, as well as the health system expanding from a few working hours a day, to 24/7.

The eve of Independence Day took place on 7 May 1973 in which a ceremony was held in Tirat Carmel in order to mark the 25th year of Israel's independence. During the ceremony, Honorary citizenship was granted to Knesset member, Menachem Begin, who in time became the sixth Prime Minister of Israel. During Begin's speech, Eliash suffered another heart attack. He was taken to Rambam hospital, where he was pronounced dead.

He left a pregnant wife and six children. After his death, a neighborhood in Tirat Carmel was named after him – Naveh Eliash, and a Likud branch in the city was also named for him.
