= Yossef Gutfreund =

Munich Massacre victim (1931–1972)

- יוסף גוטפרוינד
- Born: 1 November 1931; Craiova, Romania
- Died: 6 September 1972 (aged 40); Fürstenfeldbruck, West Germany
- Cause of death: Terrorist attack
- Body discovered: Fürstenfeldbruck Air Base

Yossef Gutfreund (Hebrew: יוסף גוטפרוינד; 1 November 1931 – 6 September 1972) was an Israeli wrestling judge for his country's 1972 Olympic team. He was murdered in the Munich massacre by Black September terrorists along with 10 other members of the Israeli team.

== Biography ==
Yosef Gutfreund attended medical school in Romania, planning to become a veterinarian, but later took up wrestling. Munich was his third Olympics as a wrestling referee.

== Kidnap and death ==
On 5 September 1972, Gutfreund was sleeping in the Israeli coaches' quarters in the Olympic Village. At around 4:30 am he heard a noise outside the door and went to investigate, thinking that it might be wrestling coach Moshe Weinberg, who had the other key to the door. He saw the door begin to open and caught a glimpse of masked men with guns on the other side. Gutfreund threw his 6-foot 3-inch, 290 pound frame against the door and screamed a warning to his fellow Israelis. The force expended by Gutfreund on one side of the door and the eight fedayeen on the other was enough to twist the hinges and doorjambs out of place. The precious few seconds allowed his roommate, weightlifting coach Tuvia Sokolsky, to smash a window and escape. In the adjacent Apartment 2, race-walker Dr. Shaul Ladany was jolted awake by Gutfreund's screams and also managed to escape the building.

Gutfreund and eight other members of Israeli's Olympic team were captured by the terrorists. Two others who resisted the kidnappers, wrestling coach Weinberg and weightlifter Yossef Romano, were killed by the intruders during the initial break-in.

Twenty-one hours later, on 6 September, Gutfreund was shot and killed by the terrorists during a failed rescue attempt by West German authorities.
