= Kehat Shorr =

Israeli coach and Munich massacre victim

- קהת שור
- Born: 21 February 1919; Șuici, Argeș County, Kingdom of Romania
- Died: 6 September 1972 (aged 53); Fürstenfeldbruck, West Germany
- Cause of death: Shot to death by Black September Organization terrorists
- Body discovered: Fürstenfeldbruck Air Base
- Resting place: Kiryat Shaul Cemetery

Kehat Shorr (Hebrew: קהת שור; 21 February 1919 – 6 September 1972) was the shooting coach for the 1972 Israeli Olympic team. He was one of the 11 members of Israel's Olympic team killed in the Munich massacre.

== Biography ==
Kehat Shorr was born in Romania. There, he devoted himself to marksmanship and became an expert marksman. He moved to Israel in 1963 and lived in Tel Aviv with his wife and daughter. He joined the “Hapoel” team and quickly became its coach, training many young Israeli marksmen. He trained the national team for the Twentieth Olympic Games in Munich.

== Munich massacre ==
Israeli hostages Shorr (left) and Andre Spitzer (right) talk to German officials during the hostage crisis.

Kehat was among the Israelis taken hostage and murdered by Black September terrorists at the 1972 Summer Olympics. The Israeli team was sleeping in their quarters in the early morning hours of 5 September 1972, when the terrorists raided the compound, murdered two of the Israeli athletes and took the others hostage. Kehat Shorr was photographed standing next to fellow coach Andre Spitzer at the second-floor window of their besieged building while terrorists trained guns on the pair. The German authorities failed to rescue 9 hostages, including Kehat Shorr, resulting in their deaths. Shorr's team members, Henry Hershkowitz and Zelig Stroch, survived the attack.

== See also ==
- Sports in Israel
