= Yakov Springer =

Polish wrestler and Munich Massacre victim

- יעקב שפרינגר
- Born: 10 June 1921; Kalisz, Polish Republic
- Died: 6 September 1972 (aged 51); Fürstenfeldbruck, West Germany
- Cause of death: Terrorist attack
- Body discovered: Fürstenfeldbruck Air Base

Yakov Springer (Hebrew: יעקב שפרינגר; 10 June 1921 – 6 September 1972) was a wrestler and a weightlifting coach and judge but is best known as one of the victims of the Munich massacre at the 1972 Summer Olympics.

During the Holocaust, Springer took part in Warsaw Ghetto Uprising.

The Polish-born Springer was murdered with 10 other men who were representing Israel in the Olympics in Munich. They were murdered by Palestinian terrorists, from the PLO Black September group. The Palestinians took the 11 Israelis as hostages and asked for the release of 236 Palestinian prisoners in Israel and Germany. After the hostages and Black September group members arrived at the airport, the German police attacked in an attempt to rescue them. The group members killed the Israelis with guns and with grenades.
