= Munich massacre =

1972 Summer Olympics terrorist attack

- Part of the Israeli–Palestinian conflict
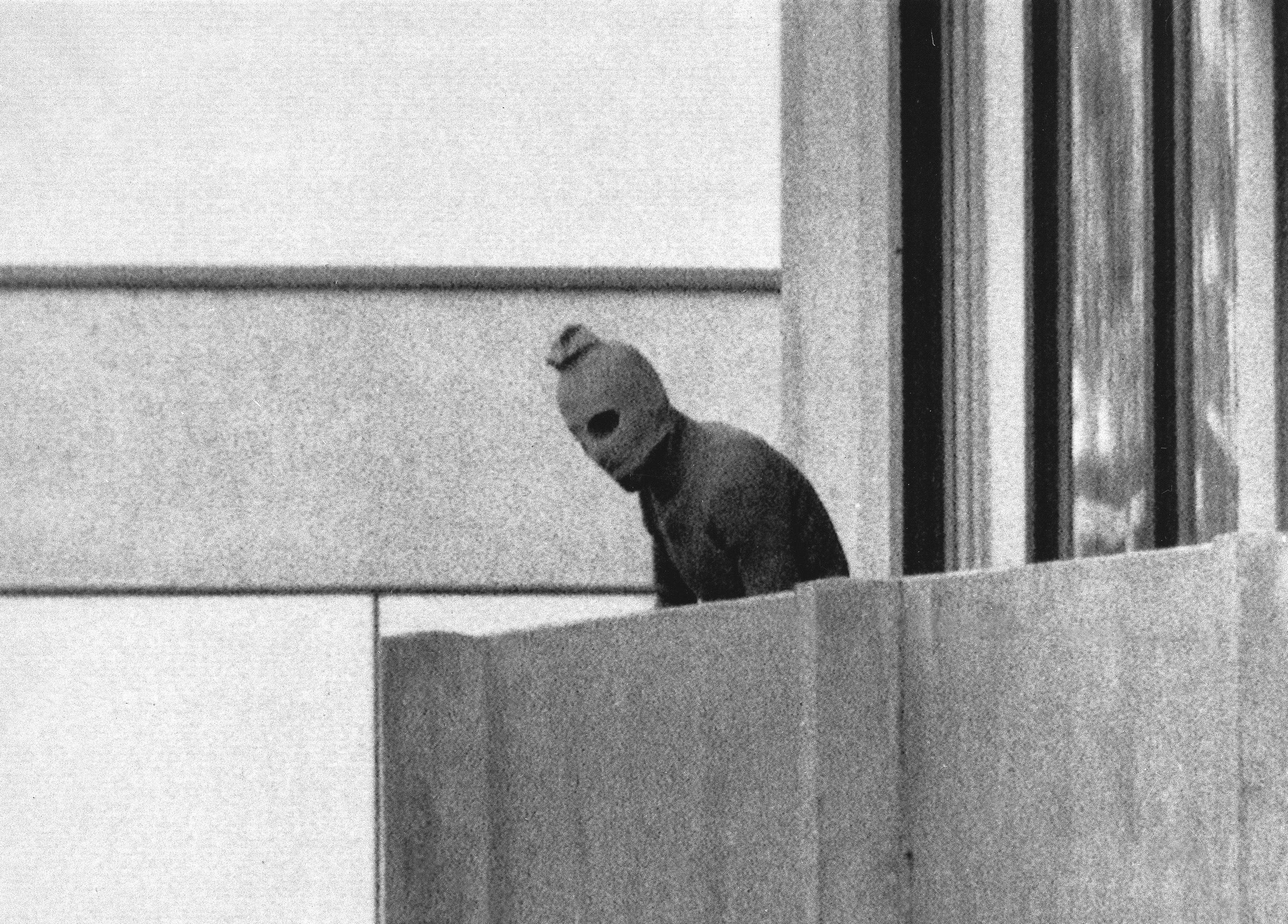
- One of the most reproduced photos taken during the siege shows a kidnapper on the balcony attached to Munich Olympic village Building 31, where members of the Israeli Olympic team and delegation were held.
- Location: 48°10′47″N 11°32′57″E; Munich, Bavaria, West Germany
- Date: 5–6 September 1972; 04:31–12:04 (UTC+1)
- Target: Israeli Olympic team
- Attack type: Hostage-taking; Mass shooting; Massacre
- Deaths: 17 total (12 victims, 5 perpetrators; see list): 6 Israeli coaches; 5 Israeli athletes; 1 West German police officer; 5 Black September members
- Perpetrator: Black September

The Munich massacre was a terrorist attack during the 1972 Summer Olympics in Munich, West Germany, carried out by eight members of the Palestinian militant organisation Black September. The militants infiltrated the Olympic Village, killed two members of the Israeli Olympic team, and took nine other Israeli team members hostage. Those hostages were later also killed by the militants during a failed rescue attempt.

Black September commander and negotiator Luttif Afif named the operation "Iqrit and Biram", after two Palestinian Christian villages whose inhabitants were expelled by Israel during the 1948 Palestine war. Intelligence files suggest that some West German neo-Nazis may have assisted Black September in the 1972 Munich massacre, though the extent of their involvement remains debated. Shortly after the hostages were taken, Afif demanded the release of a significant number of Palestinians and non-Arab prisoners held in Israel, as well as one of the West German–imprisoned founders of the Red Army Faction, Ulrike Meinhof. The list included 328 detainees.

West German police from the Bavarian Police ambushed the terrorists, killing five of the eight Black September members, but the rescue attempt failed, resulting in the deaths of all the hostages. A West German police officer was also killed in the crossfire. The West German government faced criticism for the rescue attempt and its handling of the incident. The three surviving perpetrators were arrested but were released the following month in a hostage exchange after the hijacking of Lufthansa Flight 615. By then, the Israeli government had launched an assassination campaign, which authorised the Mossad to track down and kill anyone who had played a role in the attack.

Two days before the start of the 2016 Summer Olympics, Brazilian and Israeli officials led a ceremony where the International Olympic Committee (IOC) honoured the eleven Israelis and one German killed at Munich. During the 2020 Summer Olympics, a moment of silence was observed in the opening ceremony.

== Background ==
Ahead of the 1972 Olympics, the West German Olympic Organising Committee aimed to discard Germany's military image, wary of the propaganda portrayed by the 1936 Summer Olympics under Nazi dictator Adolf Hitler. The IOC President at the time, Avery Brundage, had been involved in the 1936 Olympics and had lived through the experience of those games.

Security personnel, known as OLYs, were inconspicuous and primarily prepared to handle ticket fraud and drunkenness. The documentary film One Day in September claims that security in the athletes' Village was inadequate for the Games. Athletes could bypass security and enter other countries' rooms by climbing over the 2 m (6 ft 7 in)-high chain-link fence surrounding the Olympic Village, rather than using the official entrances.

The absence of armed personnel worried Israeli delegation head Shmuel Lalkin, even before his team arrived in Munich. In later interviews with journalists Serge Groussard and Aaron J. Klein, Lalkin said he had expressed concerns to the relevant authorities about his team's lodgings. The team was housed in a relatively isolated part of the Olympic Village, on the ground floor of a small building close to a gate, which Lalkin felt made them particularly vulnerable to an outside assault. The West German authorities assured Lalkin that extra security would be provided for the Israeli team, but Lalkin doubts that any additional measures were taken.

Olympic organisers asked West German forensic psychologist Georg Sieber to present some threat scenarios to aid in planning security, and he presented 26 scenarios. His "Situation 21" scenario accurately predicted an incursion of Palestinian elements into the Olympic Village. However, the organisers did not forward the document to the West German authorities, as guarding the Games against such threats conflicted with their goal of hosting "Carefree Games" without heavy security. Despite having clear intelligence from multiple sources and technically considering the possibility of such an attack, the Bavarian State police were still taken by surprise.

=== Claims of German awareness before the attack ===
The German news magazine Der Spiegel reported in 2012 that West German authorities had received a tip-off from a Palestinian informant in Beirut three weeks before the massacre. The informant warned that Palestinians were planning an "incident" at the Olympic Games, and the Federal Foreign Office in Bonn took the tip-off seriously enough to pass it to the Bavarian State Secret Service in Munich, urging that "all possible security measures" be taken. According to Der Spiegel, the authorities failed to act on the tip, and never acknowledged it in the following 40 years. The magazine claimed this was part of a 40-year cover-up by German authorities regarding their mishandling of the response to the massacre.

== Planning and German involvement ==
Historical documents released to Der Spiegel by the German secret service show that Dortmund police had been aware of collaboration between Abu Daoud and neo-Nazi Willi Pohl (a.k.a. E. W. Pless and, since 1979, officially named Willi Voss) seven weeks before the attack.

The historian Wolfgang Kraushaar has suggested that the left-wing militant Wilfried Böse may have also provided support for the attack.

== Attack and hostage taking ==
The attackers were reported to be Palestinian terrorists from refugee camps in Lebanon, Syria, and Jordan. They were identified as Luttif Afif (code name Issa), the leader (three of Issa's brothers were also reportedly members of Black September, with two in Israeli jails), his deputy Yusuf Nazzal ("Tony"), and junior members Afif Ahmed Hamid ("Paolo"), Khalid Jawad ("Salah"), Ahmed Chic Thaa ("Abu Halla"), Mohammed Safady ("Badran"), Adnan Al-Gashey ("Denawi"), and Al-Gashey's cousin, Jamal Al-Gashey ("Samir").

According to the author Simon Reeve, Afif, Nazzal, and one of their confidantes had all worked in various capacities in the Olympic Village and had spent a couple of weeks scouting for their potential target. A member of the Uruguay Olympic delegation, which shared housing with the Israelis, claimed that he found Nazzal inside 31 Connollystraße less than 24 hours before the attack. However, since Nazzal was recognised as a worker in the Village, nothing was thought of it at the time. The other members of the group entered Munich via train and plane in the days leading up to the attack.

On Monday evening, 4 September, the Israeli athletes enjoyed a night out, watching a performance of Fiddler on the Roof and dining with the star of the play, Israeli actor Shmuel Rodensky, before returning to the Olympic Park in Munich. On the return trip in the team bus, Lalkin denied his 13-year-old son—who had befriended weightlifter Yossef Romano and wrestler Eliezer Halfin—permission to spend the night in their Olympic Village apartment at Connollystraße 31, a decision that may have saved the boy's life.

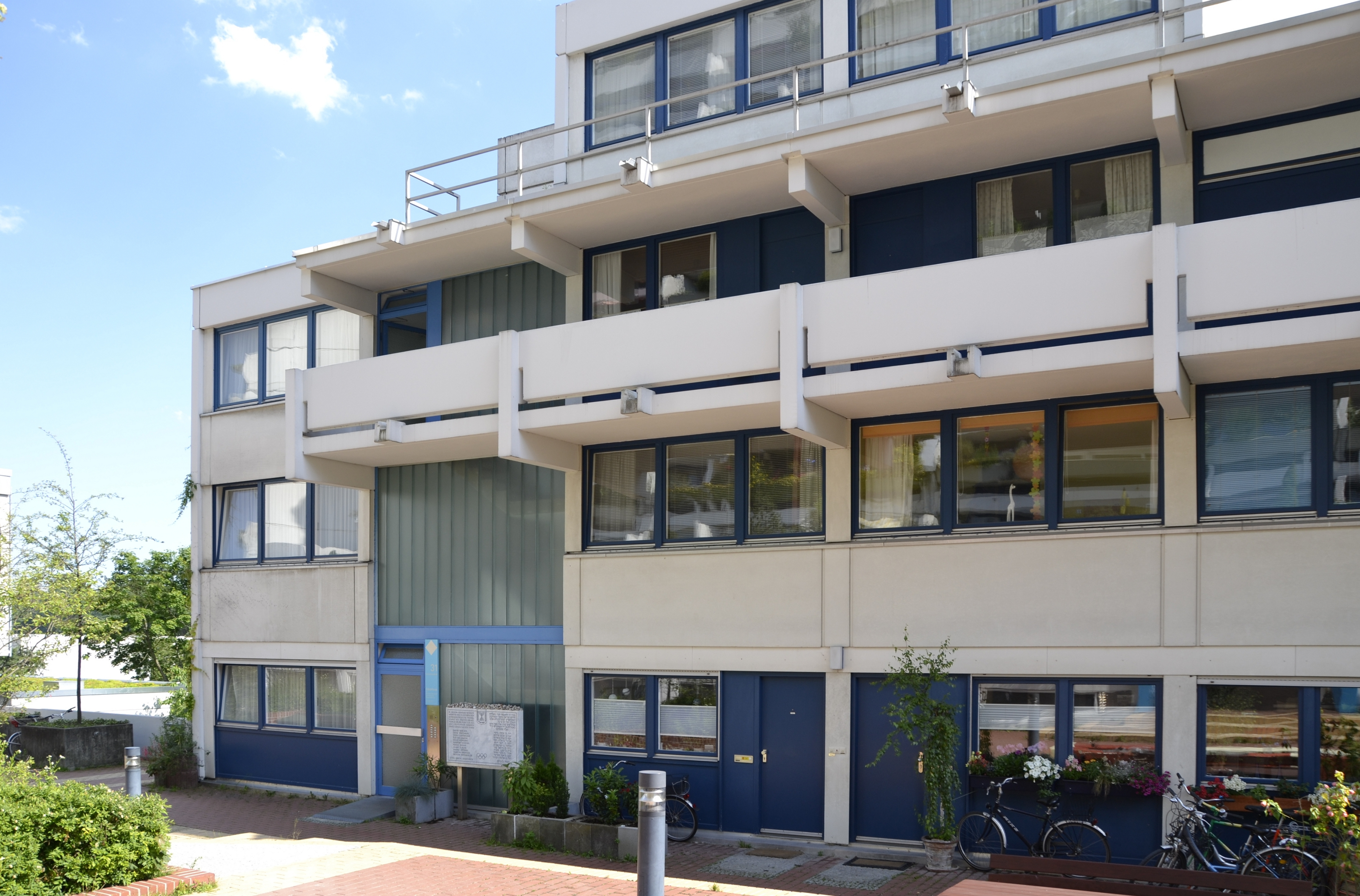
Front view and entrance of the apartment building Connollystraße 31 in 2012. A memorial plaque is visible to the right of the front door.

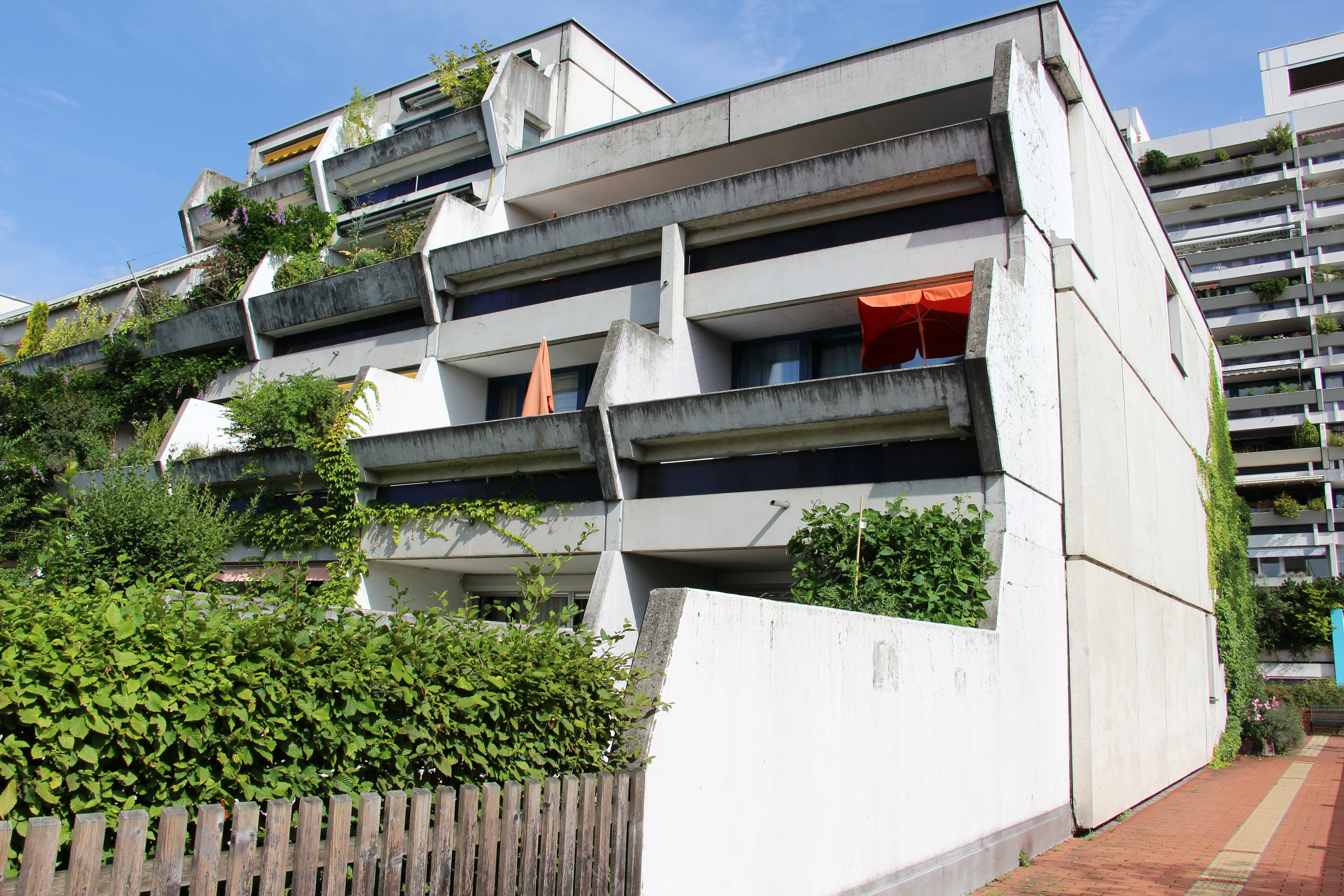
Rear view of the apartment building at Connollystraße 31 in 2017

The hostages were taken during the second week of the Games. At 04:10 local time on 5 September, as the athletes slept, eight tracksuit-clad members of the Black September faction of the Palestine Liberation Organization, carrying duffel bags loaded with AKM assault rifles, Tokarev pistols, and hand grenades, scaled a 2-metre (6 1/2 ft) chain-link fence with the assistance of unsuspecting athletes who were also sneaking into the Olympic Village. They were originally identified as US athletes, but were later claimed to be Canadians. Canadian swimmer Karen James has said that four hooded men, whom she later realized were terrorists, scaled the fence with her group as they took a shortcut back to their rooms.

They entered the two-story apartment building at Connollystraße 31, which housed the Israeli, Hong Kong, and Uruguay Olympic delegations, through an unlocked front door. Yossef Gutfreund, a wrestling referee, was awakened by a faint scratching noise at the door of Apartment 1, which housed the Israeli coaches and officials. Investigating the noise, he saw the door begin to open and masked men with guns on the other side. Shouting a warning to his sleeping roommates, he threw his 135 kg (300 lb) weight against the door in an attempt to stop the intruders from forcing their way in. Gutfreund's actions gave his roommate, weightlifting coach Tuvia Sokolovsky, enough time to escape through a window (which he had previously done during The Holocaust). Meanwhile, wrestling coach Moshe Weinberg, known as "Muni", fought the intruders, who shot him through his cheek and then forced him to help them find more hostages.

Leading the intruders past Apartment 2, Weinberg lied, telling them that the residents were not Israelis. Instead, he directed them to Apartment 3, where the gunmen corralled six wrestlers and weightlifters as additional hostages. Weinberg might have hoped that the stronger men would have a better chance of fighting off the attackers than those in Apartment 2, but they were all surprised in their sleep.

As the athletes from Apartment 3 were marched back to the coaches' apartment, the wounded Weinberg attacked the gunmen again, allowing one of his wrestlers, Gad Tsobari, to escape via the underground parking garage. Weinberg knocked one of the intruders unconscious and slashed at another with a fruit knife but failed to draw blood before being shot to death.

Weightlifter Yossef Romano, a veteran of the 1967 Six-Day War, also attacked and wounded one of the intruders before being shot and later succumbing. According to a report by The New York Times on 1 December 2015, Romano, after he was shot, was slowly left to bleed to death and, at some point over many hours, was castrated.

The gunmen were left with nine hostages: in addition to Gutfreund, they had shooting coach Kehat Shorr, track and field coach Amitzur Shapira, fencing master Andre Spitzer, weightlifting judge Yakov Springer, wrestlers Eliezer Halfin and Mark Slavin, and weightlifters David Berger and Ze'ev Friedman. Berger was an US-expatriate with dual citizenship, while Slavin, the youngest of the hostages at 18, had only arrived in Israel from the Soviet Union four months before the Olympic Games began. Gutfreund, physically the largest of the hostages, was bound to a chair (Groussard describes him as being tied up like a mummy); the rest were lined up four apiece on the two beds in Springer and Shapira's room, and bound at the wrists and ankles, and then to each other. Romano's bullet-riddled corpse was left at his bound comrades' feet as a warning. Several of the hostages were beaten during the standoff, with some suffering broken bones as a result.

Of the other members of the Israeli team in Apartment 2, racewalker Shaul Ladany was abruptly awakened by sports shooter Zelig Shtorch, who said something like, "Arabs have shot Muni," referring to Moshe Weinberg. Ladany escaped by jumping from the rear second-story balcony. He then ran to the US dormitory, woke up their track coach Bill Bowerman, and informed him of the attack. Ladany, a survivor of the Bergen-Belsen concentration camp, was the first person to spread the alert. The remaining four residents of Apartment 2—shooters Henry Hershkowitz and Zelig Shtroch, and fencers Dan Alon and Yehuda Weisenstein—along with chef de mission Shmuel Lalkin and the two team doctors, were also able to flee the besieged building. The two female members of Israel's Olympic team, sprinter and hurdler Esther Shahamorov and swimmer Shlomit Nir, were housed in a separate part of the Olympic Village.

== Ultimatum, negotiations and first rescue effort ==
The hostage-takers demanded the release of a significant number of Palestinians and non-Arabs imprisoned in Israel, including Kōzō Okamoto of the Japanese Red Army, along with one West German insurgent held by the West German penitentiary system, Ulrike Meinhof, who was one of the founders of the West German Red Army Faction. Evidence uncovered in later years from the Munich Public Prosecutor's Office, held in the Munich State Archives, revealed that the original typewritten English-language communiqués of Black September contained a list of 328 names.

The hostage-takers threw the body of Weinberg out of the front door of the apartment building to demonstrate their resolve. Israel's response was immediate and absolute: there would be no negotiation. Israel's official policy at the time was to refuse to negotiate with terrorists under any circumstances, as according to the Israeli government such negotiations would give an incentive to future attacks.

Under Chancellor Willy Brandt and Federal Interior Minister Hans-Dietrich Genscher, Zvi Zamir, the head of Israel's Mossad, later reported the German authorities had rejected his repeated offer to deploy the IDF's Sayeret Matkal, insisting instead the Bavarian State Police would handle the crisis. The Bavarian interior minister, Bruno Merk, who headed the crisis centre jointly with Genscher and Munich's police chief Manfred Schreiber, denies that such an Israeli offer ever existed. Furthermore, such an offer of foreign military intervention could never be entertained due to the sovereignty of the Federal Republic of Germany.

According to journalist John K. Cooley, the hostage situation presented an extremely difficult political situation for the Germans because the hostages were Jewish. Munich police chief Manfred Schreiber and Bruno Merk, the interior minister of Bavaria, negotiated directly with the kidnappers, repeatedly offering an unlimited ransom. According to Cooley, the reply was that "money means nothing to us; our lives mean nothing to us." The Germans also offered the Palestinians the substitution of high-ranking German officials. The kidnappers refused both offers.

Meanwhile, the Olympic committee's refusal to suspend the games amid the emerging crisis intensified the pressure on the West German authorities and police to find a resolution.

Magdi Gohary and Mohammad Khadif, both Egyptian advisers to the Arab League, and Ahmed El Demerdash Touny, an Egyptian member of the International Olympic Committee (IOC), also helped try to win concessions from the kidnappers but to no avail. However, the German negotiators were able to convince the terrorists that their demands were being considered, as "Issa" granted several deadline extensions.

Elsewhere in the village, athletes carried on as normal, seemingly oblivious to the events unfolding nearby. The Games continued until mounting pressure on the IOC forced a suspension 12 hours after the first athlete had been murdered.

United States marathon runner Frank Shorter, observing the unfolding events from the balcony of his nearby lodging, was quoted as saying, "Imagine those poor guys over there. Every five minutes a psycho with a machine gun says, 'Let's kill 'em now,' and someone else says, 'No, let's wait a while.' How long could you stand that?"

=== Ultimatum ===
Shortly before 5:00 am, the Munich police, the organising committee, and paramedics were alerted. Ambulances arrived, and the blood-soaked body of Weinberg, who had been thrown in front of the apartment building entrance (Connollystraße 31) by the terrorists and could not be saved, was recovered. The paramedics also tried in vain to negotiate with the attackers at the building entrance to attend to the injured person inside, Romano. Despite their efforts, the attackers would not allow them to enter the building, and he eventually succumbed to his gunshot injuries.

The terrorists demanded by 9 am, the release of Palestinians and non-Arabs held captive in Israel, as well as Meinhof, who was imprisoned in West Germany. They also requested safe passage for themselves and the hostages to an Arab capital, using a plane provided for this purpose, where the hostage exchange would take place. The terrorists warned that they would shoot the hostages immediately if their demands were not met.

There are different reports about the exact number of people to be released and whether non-Arab terrorists were included. For a long time, there was talk of two hundred Palestinians. In non-fiction books by Simon Reeve, Luis Palme, and Kay Schiller, it was stated from 2006 onwards, without further source evidence, that the hostage-takers had demanded the release of 234 Palestinians from Israeli custody, as well as the German Red Army Faction terrorists Meinhof and Andreas Baader. According to historians Anna Greithanner, Dominik Aufleger, and Robert Wolff, who found the original list of the hostage-takers in the Staatsarchiv München (Munich State Archives), it contains 328 names, including Meinhof and Okamoto of the Japanese Red Army, one of the perpetrators of the massacre at Lod Airport on 30 May 1972. Various news reports and television documentaries had also claimed that the Red Army Faction founder Baader was listed along with Meinhof, but the original communiqué held in the Munich State Archives issued by the Black September group to the West German government only listed Meinhof, not Baader. A copy of the initial communiqué shown in the movie One Day in September shows Meinhof, Baader and Okamoto listed.

Between 5:40 am and 9 am, the crisis team was set up on-site and met with Federal Minister of the Interior Hans-Dietrich Genscher, Bavarian Minister of the Interior Bruno Merk, Munich Police President Manfred Schreiber, State Secretary Erich Kiesl, German National Olympic Committee President Willi Daume, and IOC President Avery Brundage, while the cabinet met in Bonn. The crisis team was given full authorisation by Chancellor Willy Brandt and the German Federal Government to do whatever was needed to rescue the hostages. At 8:45 am, the Israeli Foreign Ministry received the initial news about the attack from the Israeli embassy in Bonn. This information was then forwarded to Prime Minister Golda Meir, Minister of Education and Culture Yigal Allon (who had responsibility for the Olympic team), and Minister of Defence Moshe Dayan.

As the ultimatum neared its expiry, the crisis team resumed negotiations with the German-speaking leader of the terrorists, "Issa", who hid his face under a mask and wore a white hat. With the assistance of an envoy from the Arab League and the head of the Egyptian IOC delegation, they managed to extend the ultimatum.

That evening at the press centre, Mark Spitz's first post-competition press conference was held. Rather than ask about his performance, reporters questioned him about his reaction to the ongoing hostage situation. (Note: "The first question to him was indeed about his reaction to the assault against the Israeli athletes and coaches. "I think it’s awful …" he began, adding, in a panic, "no comment." He slunk back from the microphone, wearing a stricken look. Other questions followed, but reporters yelled that they had trouble hearing his answers. ~. Spitz was ushered off the stage.") Spitz, himself of Jewish origin, was advised by officials to leave Munich the same day.

=== Midday extension ===
A quarter of an hour before the noon ultimatum expired, an extension of three hours, until 3 pm, was negotiated with the terrorists. During the negotiations, the mayor of the Olympic Village, Walther Tröger, along with Willi Daume, Manfred Schreiber, the Munich Police President and the head of security for the Games of the XX Olympiad, Bavarian Minister of the Interior Bruno Merk, and Federal Minister of the Interior and Vice President of the German NOC, Hans-Dietrich Genscher, offered themselves to the terrorists as replacement hostages, but to no avail.

The Israeli ambassador to Germany, Eliashiv Ben-Horin, announced around midday that the Israeli cabinet had decided not to accept the demands of the hostage-takers. Meir rejected the demands in order not to risk the lives of its citizens abroad for all time. Ambassador Ben Horin underscored Israel's faith in the German authorities' ability to save the hostages and demanded that the sporting competitions be halted until the hostage-taking was concluded.

At one point during the crisis, the German negotiators demanded direct contact with the hostages to satisfy themselves the Israelis were still alive. Fencing coach Andre Spitzer, who spoke fluent German, and shooting coach Kehat Shorr, the senior member of the Israeli delegation, had a brief conversation with West German officials while standing at the second-floor window of the besieged building, with two kidnappers holding guns on them. When Spitzer attempted to answer a question, he was clubbed with the butt of an AK-47 in full view of international television cameras and pulled away from the window.

=== Afternoon extension and suspension of the Olympic Games ===
At 3:25 pm, the ultimatum was postponed to 5 pm. By 3:38 pm, the Olympic Games were suspended, after allowing ongoing competitions to be completed. The terrorists repeatedly changed their clothes and appeared on the balcony, with their number estimated at five.

Meanwhile, the terrorists learned from radio and television broadcasts that the police were approaching and had planned a rescue operation. The authorities had failed to cut off the terrorists' electricity and remove the press from the Olympic Village.

=== German police mission to liberate the hostages ===
Israeli hostages Kehat Shorr (left) and Andre Spitzer (right) talk to West German officials during the hostage crisis.

In the early 1970s, counter-terrorism and tactical policing were largely unheard-of methods for combating terrorism, and no military force worldwide had a unit specifically trained for managing hostage crises. In West Germany, the absence of specialised units in the modern sense meant that such responsibilities were reactive and improvised measures, falling under the remit of ordinary law enforcement agencies. Although special military combat units existed within the Bundeswehr, their 'combatant' status under the post-World War II German constitution prohibited their deployment for internal operations during peacetime. As a result, these duties fell within the jurisdiction of the regional state and municipal police. The ensuing events in Munich would mark a critical juncture, compelling governments to recognise terrorism as a persistent security challenge and address it with diverse resources.

By 4:30 pm, a hastily improvised team of 13 West German police officers, who had signed a declaration to willingly participate in a bold and risky hostage rescue operation, could be seen scaling the building in the Olympic Village. Awkwardly disguised in Olympic training suits, wearing heavy bulletproof vests beneath, and carrying Walther MP submachine guns, they were thought to be members of the German Federal Border Guard; according to former Munich police officer Heinz Hohensinn, who was a lead officer (Einsatzleiter) and part of the police assault operation on the ground, they were regular Munich police officers from the Bavarian State Police, with no experience in counter-terrorism or hostage rescue. Quoting Hohensinn, they realised from the onset that the bulletproof vests would not withstand the Russian ammunition the terrorists were using.

The police officers were also informed and had signed a declaration that they had to return the Olympic training suits the next day, washed and cleaned, despite not knowing if they would survive or what was about to confront them. They planned to crawl down from the ventilation shafts and overpower the terrorists. The police officers took up positions awaiting the codeword "Sunshine", which, upon hearing, they were to begin the assault.

In the meantime, camera crews filmed the actions of the police officers from nearby apartments in the Olympic Village and broadcast the images live on television. This allowed the terrorists to watch the police prepare for the attack and hear it on the radio. A press image shows one of the terrorists peering from the balcony door—an image that became world-famous—while an armed police officer stood on the roof less than 12 m (40 ft) away.

After "Issa" threatened to kill some of the hostages and the police cover had been blown by the television coverage, the police were forced to suspend the rescue operation to avoid a bloodbath and retreated from the premises. The press were also removed from the Olympic Village.

=== Apparent change to demands in the evening ===
Shortly before the 5 pm deadline, the terrorists demanded safe passage for themselves and the hostages on a plane to Cairo, where they intended to continue negotiations for the prisoners' release. To verify the hostages were still alive, Minister Genscher and Walter Tröger, the mayor of the Olympic Village, were briefly allowed into the apartments to speak with the hostages. Clearly in fear for their lives, they agreed to fly to the Egyptian capital with the terrorists.

Tröger noticed that several of the hostages, especially Gutfreund, showed signs of having suffered physical abuse at the hands of the terrorists and that David Berger had been shot in his left shoulder. Tröger spoke of being very moved by the dignity with which the Israelis held themselves, and that they seemed resigned to their fate.

While being debriefed by the crisis team, Genscher and Tröger reported seeing "five" terrorists inside the apartment. Fatefully, this number, rather than "eight", was accepted as definitive.

As a sovereign state, the Federal Republic of Germany could not tolerate the hostage-takers forcibly transporting foreign guests to another territory at gunpoint. Moreover, none of the Arab states supported the diplomatic efforts of Brandt. Consequently, no agreement was reached, as they did not want to be involved in the situation.

A feigned agreement had been reached. The terrorists from Black September and their nine Israeli hostages were to be flown out of the Munich Olympic Village by helicopter to an awaiting aircraft at Fürstenfeldbruck airbase. It was only through this manoeuvre that they were able to extend the ultimatum to 7 pm. From 6 pm, Schreiber's deputy Georg Wolf, and five police officers began preparing for a potential operation in Fürstenfeldbruck airbase, knowing it would be their last option for freeing the hostages.

== Second rescue effort ==
The West German plan was to deceptively offer to transport the terrorists and the hostages by plane to Cairo. Two Bell UH-1 helicopters from the Federal Border Guard were assigned to take them to nearby Fürstenfeldbruck, a West German Air Force NATO airbase. Initially, the perpetrators planned to go to Munich-Riem airport, which was the international airport near Munich at the time, but the German negotiators convinced them that Fürstenfeldbruck would be more practical.

The operation in Fürstenfeldbruck was designed as an alternative to one in the Olympic Village. Georg Wolf, Schreiber's deputy, who later led the police team in Fürstenfeldbruck, advocated to the crisis team for freeing the hostages at the Fürstenfeldbruck airbase. This location was advantageous because the West German police could arrive before the hostage-takers and set up the operation. Being a military airbase, it could be easily cleared, ensuring no external parties would be at risk during a shootout.

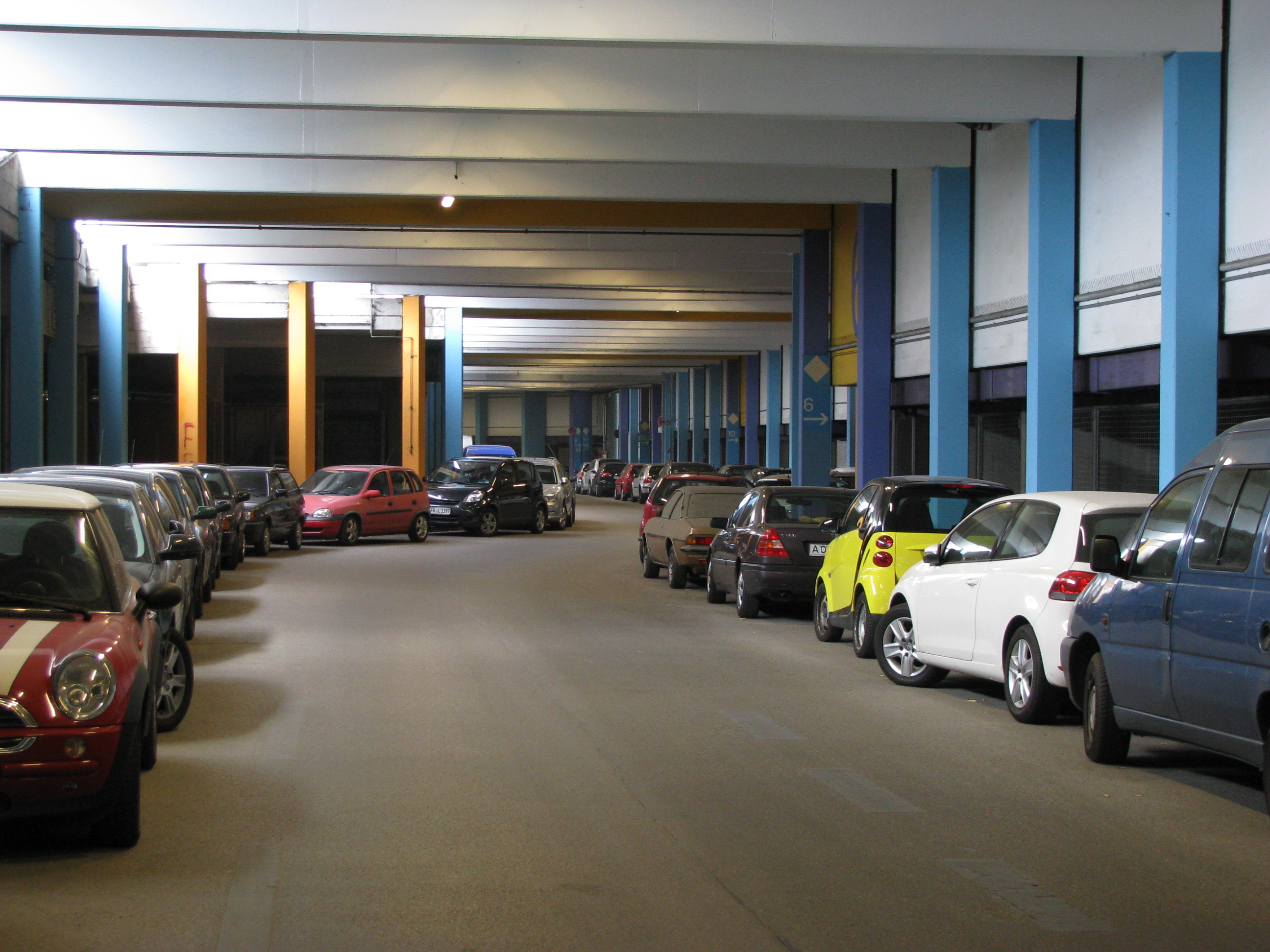
Underground car parking garage at Connollystraße in 2013

A plan was devised to walk the Palestinians and Israelis through the basement garage of the Olympic Village to the helicopters. The West German police saw an opportunity to ambush the terrorists and positioned sharpshooters in the garage basement. However, at 8:30 pm, "Issa" insisted on checking the route first from Connollystraße 31 to the helicopters. He became suspicious and demanded to travel the entire route from Munich to Fürstenfeldbruck by bus. The German negotiators did not agree to this, as the entire route could not be adequately secured. Eventually, the crisis team and the hostage-takers agreed to transport the group by bus to the helicopters. Thus, the plan to free the hostages in the basement garage of the Olympic Village had failed.

The terrorists wanted to first check the transport that would drive them the 400 m (1,300 ft) to the helicopters and requested it be brought to the basement garage. Jürgen Kuhr, a soldier and driver in a transport squadron with the Air Transport Wing 63 of the German Air Force, was assigned, along with five colleagues and four civilian drivers, to provide transport during the Games for athletes, visitors, officials, and security personnel using two Mercedes minibuses with a total of 22 seats between them. In the evening, they received a request for one of the minibuses to go to the basement garage. Kuhr volunteered because he was single, while his colleague on the other bus was married with children. At 9:03 pm, Kuhr made his way. He was instructed to drive the minibus to the underground garage with exterior lights off, and interior lights on, and wait.

Moments later, he met "Issa", who was carrying a weapon. "Issa" didn't check Kuhr for weapons, and even reassured him by saying in German that he had nothing to fear and only wanted to inspect the bus. After "Issa" checked the bus with a torch, he found it too small and told Kuhr he could drive away. The encounter lasted two minutes. The hostage-takers and hostages later boarded a larger bus from the basement garage to the helicopters, an event that was filmed live and captured by news photographers.

The crisis team made a final attempt to buy time by announcing that no plane was available for the flight to Cairo, which extended the ultimatum to 9 pm. This deadline also passed. At 9:36 pm, the Lufthansa plane was ready at Fürstenfeldbruck, and Wolf then flew back to the airbase at 9:43 pm with five police officers.

By 10:06 pm, the heavily armed hostage-takers led the bound hostages onto the bus that transported them to the helicopters. After a brief inspection, "Issa" ordered the Israeli athletes to board them, with four hostage-takers sitting next to the hostages in each helicopter.

Police chief Schreiber discovered the exact number of hostage-takers when they boarded the helicopters, realising there were eight instead of the previously believed five. He did not relay this information to Fürstenfeldbruck airbase, assuming the operations team was already aware.

The first helicopter to arrive, carrying crisis team members, advisors, and two Israeli security experts, landed at Fürstenfeldbruck airbase. This helicopter was separate from the two others carrying the hostage-takers and hostages that would arrive shortly after.

=== Ambush plan at Fürstenfeldbruck airbase ===
Five West German police officers were deployed around the airbase in sniper roles. From behind the cover provided by the balustrade of the control tower platform, Sniper No. 3, supported by an observer, was positioned with a field of fire to the east. Sniper No. 4 had a field of fire to the northeast, while Sniper No. 5 was at the northeast corner of the platform with a field of fire to the east, but could also fire north. Sniper No. 1, along with an observer, was positioned behind a fire engine, to the side of and at a distance from the switchyard, on the grass area beyond the runway northeast of the control tower, with a field of fire in all directions. Sniper No. 2 was positioned behind the low concrete square frame surrounding the switchyard, with a field of fire to the southeast. The field of fire was intensely illuminated with airbase mast lighting, designed to enhance the snipers' accuracy and blind the hostage-takers.

However, none of them had any sniper training or special weapons, being equipped with the H&K G3, the standard-issue battle rifle of the German Armed Forces, without telescopic sights or night vision devices. The officers were chosen due to their performance in shooting exercises. At that time, the Munich police had already acquired the relatively new Steyr SSG 69 sniper rifles in their inventory, but no precision shooters had been trained to use them.

The members of the crisis team—Schreiber, Genscher, Merk, and Schreiber's deputy Georg Wolf—supervised and observed the attempted rescue from the airbase control tower. Ulrich Wegener, a liaison officer from the German Federal Border Guard, Mossad chief Zamir, and Victor Cohen from the Israel Security Agency were also present, but the German authorities strictly limited the two Israelis to observing.

A fully fuelled Lufthansa aircraft was positioned on the tarmac east of the airbase control tower, with its engines running. The plan was to have the police officers involved in the earlier assault attempt disguised as flight crew inside. It was agreed that "Issa" and "Tony" would inspect the plane. The police officers would then overpower them as they boarded, giving the snipers a chance to eliminate the remaining terrorists at the helicopters.

However, the police officers, arriving by car with blue lights flashing, were initially hampered by airbase security and informed they were not authorised to allow anyone onto the airfield. The officers took cover in a ditch and could see the aircraft, with engines running loudly, 150 metres (490 ft) away.

Heinz Hohensinn, one of the lead police officers, then received a radio message to proceed to the aircraft and was informed of the plan. In the complete helplessness of the situation, he learned they were to disguise themselves as flight crew, board the aircraft, and conduct the assault inside. However, he rejected the idea as a certain failure. He believed the terrorists would not board the aircraft like a "goose march", and if they realised that it was an ambush and that they would not be flown out, the outcome with a fully fuelled aircraft would be disastrous.

=== Final phase ===
During the final moments, as the two Federal Border Guard helicopters approached Fürstenfeldbruck airbase with the terrorists and hostages on board, the West German police officers assigned to board the awaiting 727 aircraft decided it was too dangerous due to inadequate security precautions. They were ill-equipped and poorly protected inside the aircraft, resolving to abandon their mission. This left only the five police sharpshooters to try to overpower a larger and more heavily armed group. Wolf could not adjust the operation plan as the two helicopters with the hostage-takers and hostages were already approaching Fürstenfeldbruck.

At that point, Oberleutnant Ulrich Wegener, Hans-Dietrich Genscher's Federal Border Guard liaison officer at the Federal Ministry of the Interior, remarked, "I'm sure this will blow the whole affair!". Wegener, who later founded and commanded the elite German counter-terrorism intervention unit GSG 9, had an incredulous exchange with Genscher only hours earlier regarding the actions of the Munich and Bavarian police preparing to ambush the terrorists in the Olympic Village apartment. At around 4:35 pm, Wegener had remarked in consternation to his boss Genscher, "This contradicts all basic tactical rules", to which Genscher replied, "Many of the police know nothing about this".

The helicopters landed next to each other just after 10:30 pm, and the four pilots got out first. As previously agreed with the operations team, they opened the doors to the passenger compartments where the hostage-takers and the hostages were. The operational plan called for the pilots to then head north to avoid coming under fire, but two of the hostage-takers had already exited and prevented them from doing so. Meanwhile, operations manager Wolf was lying on the roof of the airbase tower, still unaware of the exact number of hostage-takers. Additionally, the helicopters' rotor blades cast large shadows, providing cover for the hostage-takers. This crucial detail had not been considered during daylight planning.

While two of the hostage-takers threatened the pilots at gunpoint, their leader "Issa" went to inspect the 727 aircraft immediately after landing, with "Tony", the second leader, following at a distance. Wolf decided to first free the four pilots from their dangerous situation. Two police snipers took positions on the northern balustrade of the tower and targeted the hostage-takers threatening the pilots. Only after they fired would the third sniper on the airbase tower open fire on "Issa" and "Tony". However, the order to fire was delayed because the pilots were in the line of fire. Meanwhile, "Issa" and "Tony" had arrived at the 727 aircraft. Realising there were no personnel on board, they recognised the trap and immediately sprinted back to the helicopters.

Only when "Issa" and "Tony" had almost reached the eastern helicopter did the police snipers simultaneously shoot at the two hostage-takers threatening the pilots. Both fell to the ground, unable to use their weapons. The pilots tried to get to safety, with one fleeing behind the low wall of the switchyard, where he encountered a police sniper. The third sniper on the airbase tower had already targeted "Issa" and "Tony" and was waiting for the first shot. However, when he opened fire, he could no longer hit them from his position. The two snipers on the tower, who had already shot at the hostage-takers near the helicopters, turned and aimed at "Issa" and "Tony". Although "Issa" was hit in the leg, he managed to hide with "Tony" in the shadow of the eastern helicopter's rotor blades, from where they kept the upper part of the airbase tower under constant fire. The two snipers positioned on the ground were barely able to intervene in the exchange of fire due to their positions to the east and north of the helicopters. After the first shots were fired, one of the hostage-takers lay behind the rear of the western helicopter, pretending to be dead until he was arrested.

Over the next hour, shots were repeatedly fired as the tense standoff continued. Police Chief Schreiber had instructed Officer Anton Fliegerbauer and two colleagues to provide fire support for the snipers positioned on the airfield. Armed with standard police-issue 6-shot Walther PP sidearms, one spare magazine each, and one radio between them, they had taken up positions crouched behind a wall at the foot of the Fürstenfeldbruck airbase control tower, directly across from where the two helicopters landed. Amid the gunfire, Fliegerbauer's team leader (Zugführer) Arved Semerak recalls standing 20 m (66 ft) away when Fliegerbauer was fatally hit by a stray bullet from the hostage-takers. In the chaos, Semerak did not notice what had happened until paramedics began attending to Fliegerbauer. The bullet struck the side of his head, killing him.

Due to the danger to the police officers' lives, Wolf felt it was unjustifiable to risk freeing the hostages who might still be alive. He decided to wait for the police armoured personnel carriers requested from the Olympic Village before attempting another assault. However, these vehicles had only been ordered to Fürstenfeldbruck airbase ten minutes after the first shots were fired. Onlookers had flocked to the scene in droves, blocking traffic.

Meanwhile, Israeli security expert Cohen grabbed a megaphone and addressed the members of Black September in Arabic: "Surrender. Save your lives." The response was a hail of bullets.

=== Failed liberation in the early morning of 6 September ===
Around 11:50 pm six Mowag MR 8 police armoured personnel carriers, which had been held up in traffic, arrived from Munich. They were tasked with rescuing the injured and providing protection for police officers approaching the helicopters. As Wolf drove towards the helicopters in an armoured personnel carrier, he was shot at. One of the hostage-takers threw a hand grenade into the eastern helicopter and attempted to flee towards the switchyard, but was shot by a police sniper. The grenade detonated, setting the helicopter ablaze. David Berger died in the helicopter from smoke inhalation. The other eight hostages had already been shot by the hostage-takers: Yossef Gutfreund, Kehat Shorr, Mark Slavin, Andre Spitzer, and Amitzur Shapira in the western helicopter, and Yakov Springer, Eliezer Halfin, Ze'ev Friedman, and David Berger in the eastern one.

More police armoured personnel carriers arrived on the airbase. The arriving police officers, confused by the situation, mistakenly shot at a police sniper and the helicopter pilot at the switchyard, thinking they were hostage-takers; both were injured. Five hostage-takers, including the leaders "Issa" and "Tony", had been shot dead by the West German police. Three hostage-takers survived the exchange of fire by pretending to be dead and were arrested; Jamal Al-Gashey had been shot through his right wrist, Mohammed Safady had sustained a flesh wound to his leg, and Adnan Al-Gashey had escaped injury completely. Almost 90 minutes had passed since the helicopters had landed. By around midnight on 6 September, the battle was over. The operation had failed; none of the hostages were rescued.

A Time magazine reconstruction of the long-suppressed Bavarian prosecutor's report indicates that a third hostage-taker (Reeve identifies him as Adnan Al-Gashey) stood at the door of the western helicopter and raked the remaining five hostages with machine gun fire; Gutfreund, Shorr, Slavin, Spitzer, and Shapira were shot an average of four times each.

Of the four hostages in the eastern helicopter, only Ze'ev Friedman's body was relatively intact; he had been blown clear of the helicopter by the explosion. In some cases, the exact cause of death for the hostages in the eastern helicopter was difficult to establish because the rest of the corpses were burned almost beyond recognition in the explosion and subsequent fire.

=== News wire reports ===
Between 11:30 pm and midnight, Conrad Ahlers spoke as a spokesperson for the German government, in several TV interviews. Despite the ongoing attempt to rescue the Israeli team, he described it, based on the information he had received, as a "fortunate and successful operation." Initial news reports published all over the world indicated that all the hostages were alive and that all the attackers had been killed. Only later did a representative for the IOC suggest that "initial reports were overly optimistic." At 2:55 am, Israel's ambassador in Bonn Ben-Horin reported that he had received information that all the hostages had been killed, and at 3:10 am, Mossad's chief Zamir confirmed this information. At 3:17 am, Reuters issued a corrected breaking news story: "All Israeli hostages captured by Arab guerrillas are dead." Jim McKay, who was covering the Olympics that year for the American Broadcasting Company (ABC), had taken on the job of reporting the events as Roone Arledge fed them into his earpiece. At 3:24 am, McKay received the official confirmation:

When I was a kid, my father used to say "Our greatest hopes and our worst fears are seldom realized." Our worst fears have been realized tonight. They've now said that there were eleven hostages. Two were killed in their rooms yesterday morning, nine were killed at the airport tonight. They're all gone.

Several sources listed Ladany as having been killed. Ladany recalled later:

The impact did not hit me at the time, when we were in Munich. It was when we arrived back in Israel. At the airport in Lod there was a huge crowd—maybe 20,000 people—and each one of us, the survivors, stood by one of the coffins on the runway. Some friends came up to me and tried to kiss me and hug me as if I was almost a ghost that came back alive. It was then that I really grasped what had happened and the emotion hit me.

=== Criticism ===
The shootout with the well-trained Black September members underscored a significant lack of preparation by the German authorities. They were ill-equipped to handle such an unprecedented threat previously unknown in Germany. There was no single authority overseeing the situation. The Munich police, Bavarian authorities, West German authorities, and even the Olympic committee all intervened, which increased the confusion and difficulty in handling the crisis.

German authorities faced several critical constraints. First, due to restrictions in the post-war West German constitution, the army could not participate in the attempted rescue, as the German armed forces were not allowed to operate inside Germany during peacetime. The responsibility fell entirely on the Munich police and the Bavarian authorities.

The Munich massacre was a critical juncture, prompting governments "to think about terrorism as an enduring challenge to security, international and domestic, and to respond to it with a wide range of government resources". This led directly to the founding of the German federal border guard's counter-terrorism intervention unit, GSG 9, less than two weeks later.

It was known half an hour before the hostages and kidnappers arrived at Fürstenfeldbruck airbase that the number of kidnappers was larger than initially believed. Despite this new information, Schreiber decided to proceed with the rescue operation as originally planned. The new information could not reach the police snipers because they had no radios.

It is a basic tenet of sniping operations that there are enough snipers (at least two for each known target, or in this case a minimum of ten) deployed to neutralise as many of the attackers as possible with the first volley of shots. The 2006 National Geographic Channel's Seconds from Disaster profile on the massacre stated that the helicopters were supposed to land sideways and to the west of the control tower, which would have allowed the snipers clear shots into them as the kidnappers threw open the helicopter doors. Instead, the helicopters landed facing the control tower and at the centre of the airstrip. This not only gave them a place to hide after the gunfight began, but put Snipers 1 and 2 in the line of fire of the other three snipers on the control tower.

According to the same programme, the crisis committee responsible for making decisions on how to handle the incident consisted of Bruno Merk (the Bavarian interior minister), Hans-Dietrich Genscher (the West German interior minister), and Manfred Schreiber (Munich's Chief of Police). The program mentioned that a year before the Games, Schreiber had participated in another hostage crisis (a failed bank robbery) where he ordered a sharpshooter to shoot one of the perpetrators, but only managed to wound the robber. As a result, the robbers shot an innocent woman dead. Schreiber was consequently charged with involuntary manslaughter.

The five police snipers lacked radio contact with each other and the German authorities conducting the rescue operation, making it impossible to coordinate their fire. Their only contact with the operational leadership was through Georg Wolf, Schreiber's deputy, who was lying next to the three snipers on the control tower, giving them direct orders. The two snipers at ground level received vague instructions to shoot when the other snipers began firing and were left to fend for themselves.

The police snipers did not have the proper equipment for this hostage rescue operation. The G3 rifles used were considered by several experts to be inadequate for the distance at which the snipers were trying to shoot. The G3, the standard service rifle of the Bundeswehr at that time, had a 460-millimetre (18 in) barrel; at the distances the snipers were required to shoot, a 690-millimetre (27 in) barrel would have ensured far greater accuracy. None of the rifles were equipped with telescopic or night vision sights. Additionally, none of the snipers were equipped with a steel helmet or bulletproof vest. No armoured vehicles were at the scene at Fürstenfeldbruck airbase and were only called in after the gunfight was well underway.

There were also numerous tactical errors. "Sniper 2", who was stationed behind the switchyard, was directly in the line of fire of his fellow snipers on the control tower, without any protective gear and without any other police officer being aware of his location. Because of this, "Sniper 2" did not fire any shots until late in the gunfight, when hostage-taker Khalid Jawad attempted to escape on foot and ran at the exposed sniper. "Sniper 2" killed the fleeing perpetrator but was in turn badly wounded by a fellow police officer, who was unaware that he was shooting at one of his own men. One of the helicopter pilots, Gunnar Ebel, was lying near "Sniper 2" and was also wounded by friendly fire. Both Ebel and the sniper recovered from their injuries.

Many of the errors made by the German authorities during the rescue attempt were detailed by leading police officer Heinz Hohensinn, who had participated in Operation Sunshine earlier that day. In One Day in September, he stated that he had also been directed to pose as a flight crew member in the second assault plan involving the 727 aircraft. He and his fellow police officers, who had volunteered to undertake the hostage rescue operation during the first assault attempt in the Olympic Village, understood the second assault plan to be a suicide mission. Consequently, the group unanimously resolved to abandon the second assault plan in the 727. None of them were reprimanded.

=== West German report after the attack ===
On 20 September, the West German report was published. It examined three key aspects: security measures in Munich and the Olympic Village, efforts to release the hostages without force, and the police operation at the Olympic Village and Fürstenfeldbruck airbase. The report noted warnings of potential terrorist attacks during the Olympics, though none specifically targeted Israelis. It described contacts with Israeli representatives about the security of the Israeli Olympic team, indicating no dissatisfaction with the arrangements. The authors concluded that, given the terrorists' intent, even significant security reinforcements would not have prevented the attack on the Israelis.

The second section reviewed the efforts to release the hostages, concluding that a rescue without force or flying them to Cairo was impossible, partly due to Israel's refusal to release Palestinian prisoners. The third section examined the airbase operation, raising operational questions but finding no fault with the police. The Bundestag Interior Committee adopted these conclusions, resulting in no disciplinary actions or removals.

The significant differences between the Israeli and German assessments of the operation led to a wave of claims and counter-claims following the release of reports by Mossad chief Zamir and the German authorities. The Israeli Foreign Ministry summarised these differences, highlighting major discrepancies between the West German report and the comments by Zamir and Ben-Horin. Director-General Mordechai Gazit sent this summary to Meir.

On 22 September, Zamir also reported to the Knesset Foreign Affairs and Defence Committee. He explained that while the West German authorities had a plan and were fully committed to rescuing the hostages, they struggled to improvise and adapt to the unfolding events. This inability to find solutions as the events were occurring partially contributed to the operation's failure.

== Aftermath ==
The bodies of the five Palestinian attackers—Afif, Nazzal, Chic Thaa, Hamid, and Jawad were delivered to Libya, where they received heroes' funerals and were buried with full military honours. On 8 September, Israeli planes bombed ten PLO bases in Syria and Lebanon in response to the massacre, killing a reported 200 militants and 11 civilians.

The three surviving Black September gunmen had been arrested and were being held in a Munich prison for trial. On 29 October, Lufthansa Flight 615 was hijacked and threatened to be blown up if the Munich attackers were not released. Safady and the Al-Gasheys were immediately released by West Germany, receiving a tumultuous welcome when they touched down in Libya and (as seen in One Day in September) giving their own firsthand account of their operation at a press conference broadcast worldwide.

Further international investigations into the Lufthansa Flight 615 incident have produced theories of a secret agreement between the German government and Black September on the release of the surviving terrorists in exchange for assurances of no further attacks on Germany.

=== Effect on the Games ===
In the wake of the hostage-taking, competition was suspended for 34 hours, for the first time in modern Olympic history, after public criticism of the IOC's decision to continue the games. On 6 September, a memorial service attended by 80,000 spectators and 3,000 athletes was held in the Olympic Stadium. IOC President Avery Brundage made little reference to the murdered athletes during a speech praising the strength of the Olympic movement and equating the attack on the Israeli sportsmen with the recent arguments about encroaching professionalism and disallowing Rhodesia's participation in the Games, which outraged many listeners. The victims' families were represented by Andre Spitzer's widow Ankie, Moshe Weinberg's mother, and a cousin of Weinberg, Carmel Eliash. During the memorial service, Eliash collapsed from a heart attack.

Many of the 80,000 people who filled the Olympic Stadium for West Germany's football match with Hungary carried noisemakers and waved flags, but when several spectators unfurled a banner reading "17 dead, already forgotten?" security officers removed the sign and expelled those responsible from the grounds. During the memorial service, the Olympic Flag was flown at half-mast, along with the flags of most of the other competing nations at the request of Brandt. Ten Arab nations objected to their flags flying at half-mast and the mandate was rescinded.

Willi Daume, president of the Munich organizing committee, initially sought to cancel the remainder of the Games, but in the afternoon Brundage and others who wished to continue the Games prevailed, stating that they could not let the incident halt the Games. Brundage stated "The Games must go on, and we must ... and we must continue our efforts to keep them clean, pure and honest." The decision was endorsed by the Israeli government and Israeli Olympic team chef de mission Shmuel Lalkin.

On 6 September, after the memorial service, the remaining members of the Israeli team withdrew from the Games and left Munich. All Jewish sportsmen were placed under guard. Mark Spitz, the American swimming star who had already completed his competitions, left Munich during the hostage crisis (it was feared that as a prominent Jew, he might be a kidnapping target). The Egyptian team left the Games on 7 September, stating they feared reprisals. The Philippine and Algerian teams also left the Games, as did some members of the Dutch and Norwegian teams. American marathon runner Kenny Moore, who wrote about the incident for Sports Illustrated, quoted Dutch distance runner Jos Hermens as saying "It's quite simple. We were invited to a party, and if someone comes to the party and shoots people, how can you stay?" Dutch sprinter Wilma van Gool had qualified for the semi-finals in the 200 m sprint; the time that she ran in the quarterfinals was faster than the time of the eventual gold medal winner, Renate Stecher of East Germany. She withdrew from the competition in sympathy with the Israeli victims. She said that she was leaving in protest of the "obscene" decision to continue with the Olympic Games.

Four years later at the 1976 Summer Olympics in Montreal, the Israeli team commemorated the massacre: when they entered the stadium at the Opening Ceremony, their national flag was adorned with a black ribbon.

The families of some victims have asked the IOC to establish a permanent memorial to the athletes. The IOC has declined, saying that introducing a specific reference to the victims could "alienate other members of the Olympic community," according to the BBC. Alex Gilady, an Israeli IOC official, told the BBC: "We must consider what this could do to other members of the delegations that are hostile to Israel."

The IOC rejected an international campaign in support of a minute of silence at the Opening Ceremony of the 2012 London Olympics in honour of the Israeli victims on the 40th anniversary of the massacre. Jacques Rogge, the IOC President, said it would be "inappropriate," although the opening ceremony included a memorial for the victims of the 7 July 2005 London bombings. Speaking of the decision, Olympian Shaul Ladany, who survived the attack, commented: "I do not understand. I do not understand, and I do not accept it."

In 2014 the IOC agreed to contribute $250,000 towards a memorial to the murdered Israeli athletes. After 44 years, the IOC commemorated the victims of the Munich massacre for the first time in the Rio 2016 Olympic Village on 4 August 2016.

There is a memorial to those who died outside the Olympic stadium in Munich in the form of a stone tablet at the bridge linking the stadium to the former Olympic Village, and a memorial tablet outside the front door of their former lodging at 31 Connollystraße. On 15 October 1999 (almost a year before the Sydney 2000 Games), a memorial plaque was unveiled in one of the large light towers (Tower 14) outside the Sydney Olympic Stadium.

In the 2020 Summer Olympics, a moment of silence was observed in the opening ceremony in 2021, a year before its 50th anniversary. This was the first time in history this happened in the opening ceremony.

In 2024, Adidas launched an ad campaign for retro sneakers inspired by a model from the 1972 Munich Olympics, featuring Bella Hadid, known for her pro-Palestinian activism. The campaign faced criticism from various groups due to Hadid's controversial remarks, prompting Adidas to issue an apology. The company acknowledged the unintended connection to tragic events and announced plans to revise the campaign.

On 5 September 2024, the 52nd anniversary of the massacre, shots were fired at the Israeli consulate in Munich.

== International reactions ==
King Hussein of Jordan, the only leader of an Arab country to denounce the attack publicly, called it a "savage crime against civilization ... perpetrated by sick minds."

U.S. President Richard Nixon privately discussed several possible American responses, such as declaring a national day of mourning (favoured by Secretary of State William P. Rogers) or having Nixon fly to the athletes' funerals. Nixon and U.S. National Security Advisor Henry Kissinger decided instead to press the United Nations to take steps against international terrorism.

=== Israeli response ===
On 5 September, Meir appealed to other countries to "save our citizens and condemn the unspeakable criminal acts committed." She also stated, "if we [Israel] should give in, then no Israeli anywhere in the world shall feel that his life is safe ... it's blackmail of the worst kind."

Meir and the Israeli Defence Committee secretly authorized Mossad to track down and kill those allegedly responsible for the Munich massacre. Zamir described the mission as "putting an end to the type of terror that was perpetrated" in Europe. Mossad set up several special teams to locate and kill these fedayeen, aided by the agency's stations in Europe.

In a February 2006 interview, Zamir answered direct questions:

Was there no element of vengeance in the decision to take action against the terrorists?

No. We were not engaged in vengeance. We are accused of having been guided by a desire for vengeance. That is nonsense. What we did was to concretely prevent in the future. We acted against those who thought that they would continue to perpetrate acts of terror. I am not saying that those who were involved in Munich were not marked for death. They definitely deserved to die. But we were not dealing with the past; we concentrated on the future.

Did you not receive a directive from Golda Meir along the lines of "take revenge on those responsible for Munich?"

Golda Meir abhorred the necessity that was imposed on us to carry out the operations. Golda never told me to 'take revenge on those who were responsible for Munich.' No one told me that.

The Israeli mission later became known as Operation Wrath of God or Mivtza Za'am Ha'El. Reeve quotes General Aharon Yariv—who, he writes, was the general overseer of the operation—as stating that after Munich the Israeli government felt it had no alternative but to exact justice.

We had no choice. We had to make them stop, and there was no other way ... we are not very proud about it. But it was a question of sheer necessity. We went back to the old biblical rule of an eye for an eye ... I approach these problems not from a moral point of view, but, hard as it may sound, from a cost-benefit point of view. If I'm very hard-headed, I can say, what is the political benefit in killing this person? Will it bring us nearer to peace? Will it bring us nearer to an understanding with the Palestinians or not? In most cases I don't think it will. But in the case of Black September we had no other choice and it worked. Is it morally acceptable? One can debate that question. Is it politically vital? It was.

Benny Morris writes that a target list was created using information from "turned" PLO personnel and friendly European intelligence services. Once completed, a wave of assassinations of suspected Black September operatives began across Europe. On 9 April 1973, Israel launched Operation "Spring of Youth", a joint Mossad–IDF operation in Beirut. The targets were Mohammad Yusuf al-Najjar (Abu Yusuf), head of Fatah's intelligence arm, which ran Black September, according to Morris; Kamal Adwan, who headed the PLO's Western Sector, which controlled PLO action inside Israel; and Kamal Nassir, the PLO spokesman. A group of Sayeret Matkal commandos was taken in nine missile boats and a small fleet of patrol boats to a deserted Lebanese beach, before driving in two cars to downtown Beirut, where they killed Najjar, Adwan, and Nassir. Two further detachments of commandos blew up the PFLP's headquarters in Beirut and a Fatah explosives plant.

On 21 July 1973, in the Lillehammer affair, a team of Mossad agents mistakenly killed Ahmed Bouchiki, a Moroccan man unrelated to the Munich attack, in Lillehammer, Norway, after an informant mistakenly said Bouchiki was Ali Hassan Salameh, the head of Force 17 and a Black September operative. Five Mossad agents, including two women, were captured by the Norwegian authorities, while others managed to slip away. The five were convicted of the killing and imprisoned but were released and returned to Israel in 1975. Mossad later found Ali Hassan Salameh in Beirut and killed him on 22 January 1979, with a remote-controlled car bomb. The attack killed four passersby and injured 18 others. According to CIA officer Duane "Dewey" Claridge, chief of operations of the CIA Near East Division from 1975 to 1978, in mid-1976, Salameh offered Americans assistance and protection with Arafat's blessings during the American embassy pull-out from Beirut during the Lebanese Civil War. There was a general feeling that Americans could be trusted. However, the cooperation ended abruptly after the assassination of Salameh. Americans were generally blamed as Israel's principal benefactors.

Simon Reeve writes that the Israeli operations continued for more than twenty years. He details the assassination in Paris in 1992 of Atef Bseiso, the PLO's head of intelligence, and says that an Israeli general confirmed there was a link back to Munich. Reeve also writes that while Israeli officials have stated Operation Wrath of God was intended to exact vengeance for the families of the athletes killed in Munich, "few relatives wanted such a violent reckoning with the Palestinians." Reeve states the families were instead desperate to know the truth of the events surrounding the Munich massacre. Reeve outlines what he sees as a lengthy cover-up by German authorities to hide the truth. After a lengthy court fight, in 2004 the families of the Munich victims reached a settlement of €3 million with the German government.

=== Alleged German cover-up ===
An article in 2012 in a front-page story of the German news magazine Der Spiegel reported that much of the information on the mishandling of the massacre was covered up by the German authorities. For twenty years, Germany refused to release any information about the attack and did not accept responsibility for the results. The magazine reported that the government had been hiding 3,808 files, which contained tens of thousands of documents. Der Spiegel said it obtained secret reports by authorities, embassy cables, and minutes of cabinet meetings that demonstrate the lack of professionalism of the German officials in handling the massacre. The newspaper also wrote that the German authorities were told that Palestinians were planning an "incident" at the Olympics three weeks before the massacre, but failed to take the necessary security measures, and these facts are missing from the official documentation of the German government.

In August 2012, Der Spiegel reported that following the massacre, the West German government began secret meetings with Black September, due to the fear that they would carry out other terrorist attacks in Germany. The government proposed a clandestine meeting between German Foreign Minister Walter Scheel and a member of Black September to create a "new basis of trust." In return for an exchange of the political status of the PLO, the PLO would stop terrorist attacks on German soil. When French police arrested Abu Daoud, one of the chief organizers of the Munich massacre, and inquired about extraditing him to Germany, Bavaria's justice secretary Alfred Seidl recommended that Germany should not take any action, causing the French to release Abu Daoud and the Assad regime to shelter him until he died at a Damascus hospital in 2010.

== Surviving Black September members ==
Two of the three surviving gunmen, Mohammed Safady and Adnan Al-Gashey, were allegedly killed by Mossad as part of Operation Wrath of God. Al-Gashey was allegedly located after making contact with a cousin in a Gulf State, and Safady was found by remaining in touch with family in Lebanon. This account was challenged in a book by Aaron J. Klein, who claims that Al-Gashey died of heart failure in the 1970s and that Safady was killed by Christian Phalangists in Lebanon in the early 1980s. In July 2005 PLO veteran Tawfiq Tirawi told Klein that Safady, whom Tirawi claimed as a close friend, was "as alive as you are". In 2022, a man claiming to be (and closely resembling) Safady was interviewed for a German documentary about the 50th anniversary of the massacre.

The third surviving gunman, Jamal Al-Gashey, was known to be alive as of 1999, hiding in North Africa or Syria, claiming to still fear retribution from Israel. He is the only one of the surviving terrorists to consent to interviews since 1972, having granted an interview in 1992 to a Palestinian newspaper, and having briefly emerged from hiding in 1999 to participate in an interview for the film One Day in September, during which he was disguised and his face shown only in blurry shadow.

=== Abu Daoud ===
Of those believed to have planned the massacre, only Abu Daoud, the man who claimed that the attack was his idea, is known to have died of natural causes. In January 1977, Abu Daoud was intercepted by French police in Paris while travelling from Beirut under an assumed name. Under protest from the PLO, Iraq, and Libya, who claimed that because Daoud was travelling to a PLO comrade's funeral he should receive diplomatic immunity, the French government refused a West German extradition request on grounds that forms had not been filled in properly, and put him on a plane to Algeria before Germany could submit another request.

Daoud was allowed safe passage through Israel in 1996 so he could attend a PLO meeting in the Gaza Strip to rescind an article in its charter that called for Israel's eradication. In his autobiography, From Jerusalem to Munich, first published in France in 1999, and later in a written interview with Sports Illustrated, Daoud wrote that funds for Munich were provided by Mahmoud Abbas, Chairman of the PLO since 11 November 2004, and President of the Palestinian National Authority since 15 January 2005.

Though he claims he didn't know what the money was being spent for, longtime Fatah official Mahmoud Abbas, aka Abu Mazen, was responsible for the financing of the Munich attack.

Daoud believed that if the Israelis knew that Mahmoud Abbas was the financier of the operation, the 1993 Oslo Accords would not have been achieved, during which Mahmoud Abbas was seen at the White House.

Ankie Spitzer, the widow of fencing coach and Munich victim Andre, declined several offers to meet with Abu Daoud, saying that the only place she wanted to meet him was in a courtroom. According to Spitzer, "He [Abu Daoud] didn't pay the price for what he did." In 2006, during the release of Steven Spielberg's film Munich, Der Spiegel interviewed Daoud regarding the Munich massacre. He was quoted as saying: "I regret nothing. You can only dream that I would apologize."

Daoud died of kidney failure on 3 July 2010, in Damascus, Syria.

== List of fatalities ==
Shot during the initial break-in

- Moshe Weinberg, wrestling coach
- Yossef Romano, weightlifter

Shot and killed by a grenade in eastern-side helicopter D-HAQO
According to the order in which they were seated, from left to right:

- Ze'ev Friedman, weightlifter
- David Berger, weightlifter (survived grenade but died of smoke inhalation)
- Yakov Springer, weightlifting judge
- Eliezer Halfin, wrestler

Shot in western-side helicopter D-HAQU
According to the order in which they were seated, from left to right:

- Yossef Gutfreund, wrestling referee
- Kehat Shorr, shooting coach
- Mark Slavin, wrestler
- Andre Spitzer, fencing coach
- Amitzur Shapira, track coach

Shot in control tower during the gunfight

- Anton Fliegerbauer, West German police officer

Palestinian terrorists shot dead by West German police

- Luttif Afif ("Issa")
- Yusuf Nazzal ("Tony")
- Afif Ahmed Hamid ("Paolo")
- Khalid Jawad ("Salah")
- Ahmed Chic Thaa ("Abu Halla")

== Early life and memorial for Anton Fliegerbauer ==
Anton Fliegerbauer

Fliegerbauer was born in Westerndorf, Lower Bavaria, and grew up on a farm with his two siblings. He initially attended agricultural school before taking up an apprenticeship with the Bavarian State Police in 1963. In 1964, he met his future wife, whom he married in 1966. Two years later, they had a son named Alfred. On 19 November 1970, Fliegerbauer was appointed to the rank of Polizeiobermeister (police sergeant) in the Munich Municipal Police, stationed in the Implerstraße police district.

During the Olympics, Fliegerbauer was temporarily assigned to a Bavarian Readiness (Riot) Police unit (Bayerische Bereitschaftspolizei). On 5 September, he was recalled to his police district and proceeded with a 30-officer support team in the direction of Munich-Riem Airport. Midway, they were informed that their destination was Fürstenfeldbruck Air Base, where the Munich police had planned to rescue the nine Israeli hostages held by eight Black September terrorists. Their initial task was to set up barriers at the airbase: no one was allowed in, no one was allowed out.

As the situation evolved, Fliegerbauer and two other colleagues were instructed to take up positions at the foot of the airbase control tower, crouched behind a wall, directly across from where the two Bell UH-1 helicopters transporting the hostages and terrorists would land. Armed with their standard police-issue 6-shot Walther PP sidearms, a spare magazine each, and one radio between them, they were to provide fire support for the snipers on the airfield. Amid the gunfire that ensued, Fliegerbauer's team leader (Zugführer) Arved Semerak recalled standing 20 m (66 ft) away when Fliegerbauer was fatally hit by a stray bullet from the hostage-takers. In the chaos, Semerak did not notice what had happened until paramedics began attending to Fliegerbauer. According to Simon Reeve, author of One Day in September, Fliegerbauer had fired less than half the rounds in his magazine when a stray bullet from the hostage-takers struck him in the side of the head, killing him.

Fliegerbauer was buried on 8 September after a civic funeral. The ceremony was attended by the Mayor of Munich, Georg Kronawitter, and Prime Minister of Bavaria, Alfons Goppel, with wreaths laid on behalf of Brandt and President Gustav Heinemann.

At a memorial service held at Fürstenfeldbruck Airbase in 2012, commemorating the 40th anniversary of the Munich massacre, Fliegerbauer was remembered alongside the eleven members of the Israeli delegation killed by the terrorists.

In 2016, Fliegerbauer was memorialised at the Olympic Village in Brazil.

On the memorial to the massacre erected at Olympiapark in Munich, Fliegerbauer is described in a sentence that reads, "The police failed in this attempt, and the operation ended in disaster. All of the hostages and the German police officer Anton Fliegerbauer, as well as five of the terrorists, died."

== See also ==
- GSG 9; the counter-terrorism intervention unit of the German Federal Border Guard was rapidly formed two weeks after the Munich massacre.
- Israeli casualties of war
- Lod Airport massacre
- One minute of silence
- Palestinian political violence

Other incidents of violence during the Olympic games:

- Centennial Olympic Park bombing
- 2024 France railway arson attacks
