= Ze'ev Friedman =

Israeli weightlifter

- זאב פרידמן
- Born: Ze'ev Shlomovich Friedman; 10 June 1944; Prokopyevsk, Kemerovo Oblast, Russian SFSR, Soviet Union
- Died: 6 September 1972 (aged 28); Fürstenfeldbruck, West Germany
- Cause of death: Terrorist attack
- Body discovered: Fürstenfeldbruck Air Base
- Occupations: Gymnast, weightlifter
- Height: 1.68 m (5 ft 6 in)
- Father: Shlomo Friedman
- Relatives: Nina Friedman(sister)

Ze'ev Friedman (Hebrew: זאב פרידמן; 10 June 1944 – 6 September 1972) was an Israeli flyweight weightlifter. A member of the Israeli Olympic team, he was killed in the 1972 Munich Olympics massacre.

== Biography ==
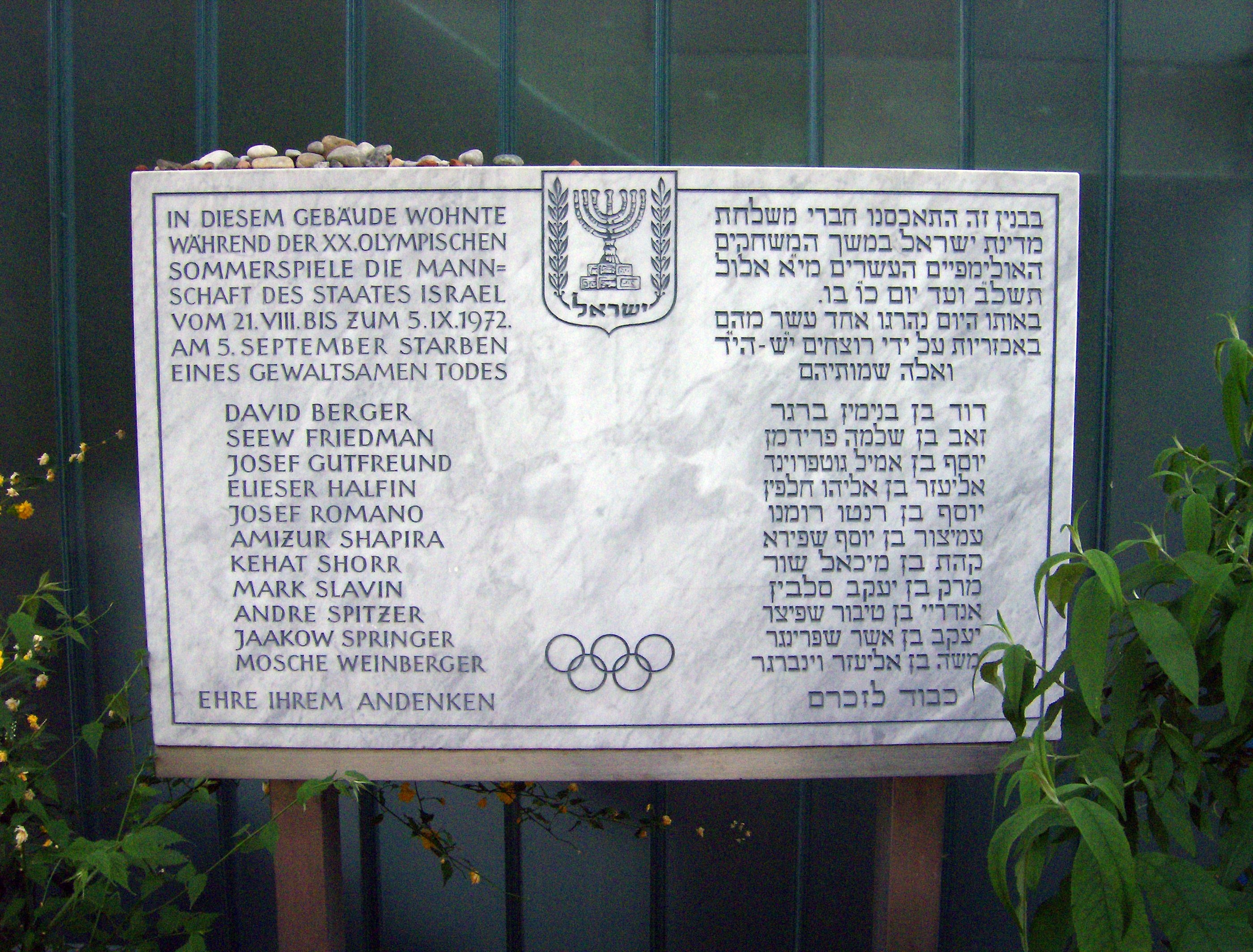
Commemorative plaque, Munich

Ze'ev Friedman was born in Prokopyevsk, Soviet Union in 1944. In 1960, he moved from Poland to Israel. He began his sports career as a gymnast, but later switched to weightlifting. He was a member of Hapoel Kiryat Haim sports club. He won a bronze medal at the 1971 Asian Weightlifting Championships.

In 1972, Ze'ev Friedman competed at the 1972 Summer Olympics in Munich, West Germany as a weightlifter. He placed 12th, one of the best achievements of any Israeli athlete at the time. On 5 September, members of the Palestinian Black September group broke into the Israeli team's dormitory and took hostage several Israeli athletes and coaches including Friedman. After protracted negotiations, the kidnappers brought the hostages to an airport via helicopter and killed them during an attempted rescue by Munich police and Bavarian border guards. The autopsy report, by the Forensic Institute of LMU Munich, concluded that Friedman had died from internal bleeding and also noted that a watch worn by the 28-year-old weight lifter was still ticking when the autopsy began, giving a time of 7:51pm.
