= Eliezer Halfin =

Israeli Olympic wrestler (1948–1972)

- Eliezer Halfin
- Born: June 18, 1948; Riga, Latvian SSR, Soviet Union
- Died: September 6, 1972 (aged 24); Fürstenfeldbruck, West Germany
- Cause of death: Terrorist attack
- Body discovered: Fürstenfeldbruck Air Base
- Resting place: Kiryat Shaul Cemetery

Eliezer Halfin (Hebrew: אליעזר חלפין; 18 June 1948 – 6 September 1972) was a Soviet-born wrestler with the Israeli Olympic team at the 1972 Summer Olympics in Munich, Germany. Along with 10 other athletes and coaches he was taken hostage and later murdered by Palestinian Black September terrorists on 5 September 1972.

Eventually they were brought to a German airport and during an attempted rescue mission staged by the German police, all nine hostages were killed on 6 September. Five of the terrorists and one German policeman were also killed. The subsequent autopsy, carried out by the Forensic Institute of LMU Munich, concluded that Halfin had died from a bullet to the heart and noted that Vivil mints were found in both trouser pockets of his corpse.

Eliezer was a mechanic by profession and was born in Riga, Soviet Union. He came to Israel in 1969 and officially became an Israeli citizen seven months prior to his death. He was survived by his parents and a sister. He was a lightweight wrestler and was active for 11 years. In Israel, he was a member of Hapoel Tel Aviv club. He won 12th place in the world championships. During 1971 he placed second place in the international competition in Bucharest, Romania. In 1972 in Greece he placed third. Participating at the 1972 Olympics was the highlight of his career and his dream. Eliezer is buried in Kiryat Shaul Cemetery in Tel Aviv.

== See also ==
- Munich massacre
