= Gad Tsobari =

Israeli wrestler

Gad Tsobari (Hebrew: גד צברי sometimes Tsabari, Zobari, or Zabari; born 30 January 1944) is an Israeli-born light-flyweight freestyle wrestler and a member of Israel's 1972 Olympic team. He finished 12th (of 50) in his event, and was considered a possible medal threat at the Montreal Games of 1976.

Tsobari was the sole survivor of the six athletes housed in Apartment 3 at 31 Connollystraße, which was the second apartment taken by Black September terrorists in the early morning hours of 5 September 1972 in an event called the Munich massacre.

Although he was originally taken hostage by the Black September terrorists, Tsobari was able to escape with the help of his already-wounded coach, Moshe Weinberg, who attacked the terrorists and received fatal gunshot wounds in the process. As Tsobari and his fellow Israelis were herded in single file, down the stairs to the ground floor, a terrorist wearing a balaclava at the foot of the stairs, gestured with his weapon the direction Tsobari was to go. At that moment, Tsobari pushed the terrorist's weapon aside and dashed down a flight of steps into the underground car park, pursued by a terrorist who shot two or three rounds at the fleeing Tsobari but missed.

Tsobari carried on sprinting for seventy metres until he came to the Olympic Village fence, which he jumped over. He then ran into the nearby Olympic press center.

He was ignored for the first few seconds until taking a journalist aside and calmly explaining what had happened and who he was. After being escorted under police guard, Tsobari found a woman that spoke Hebrew and German. Over the next five hours he sketched on maps what had happened, how he had escaped, how many people were injured and how many terrorists there were.

Nearly 18 hours later, Tsobari and the rest of the Israeli Olympians not taken hostage watched the helicopters take off for Fürstenfeldbruck airbase, where the remaining Israeli athletes taken hostage would be shot dead by the Palestinian terrorists, five of whom themselves were shot dead by German police snipers on 6 September.

== Family ==
Tsobari is the uncle of windsurfer and Olympic bronze medalist Shahar Tzuberi.

== Personal life ==
Tsobari owns and runs a bar in Israel.
