= Yossef Romano =

Israeli weightlifter

- יוסף רומנו
- Born: 15 April 1940; Benghazi, Italian Libya
- Died: 5 September 1972 (aged 32); Munich, West Germany
- Cause of death: Shot dead by Black September Organization
- Occupation: Weightlifter
- Known for: Munich massacre
- Spouse: Ilana
- Children: 3

Yossef Romano (Hebrew: יוסף רומנו; 15 April 1940 – 5 September 1972), also known as Joseph Romano or Yossi Romano, was a Libyan-born Israeli weightlifter with the Israeli team that went to the 1972 Summer Olympics in Munich, West Germany. He was the second of eleven Israeli team members killed in the Munich massacre by Palestinian members of Black September during those Olympics. He was the Israeli weight-lifting champion in the light and middle-weight divisions for nine years.

Romano was born to an Italian-Jewish family in Benghazi, Libya, one of ten children born to Larnato and Hieria Romano. When he was six years old, Romano and his family made aliyah to British Mandate Palestine (later Israel) in 1946. He was an interior decorator by profession and had three daughters with his wife, Ilana. He lived in Herzliya. Romano fought in the 1967 Six-Day War.

Romano competed in the middleweight weightlifting division in the 1972 Olympics, but was unable to complete one of his lifts due to a ruptured knee tendon. He was due to fly home to Israel on 6 September 1972, to have an operation on the injured knee.

In the early morning of 5 September 1972, members of Black September broke into the Israeli quarters of the Olympic Village. After seizing the coaches in the first apartment and wounding wrestling coach Moshe Weinberg in the face, the hostage takers forced Weinberg to lead them to other potential hostages in another apartment. There, they seized six wrestlers and weightlifters, including Romano. As the athletes were being led back to the coaches' apartment, Weinberg attacked the hostage takers, which allowed wrestler Gad Tsobari to escape but resulted in Weinberg's death by gunfire. Once inside the apartment, Romano attacked the intruders, slashing Afif Ahmed Hamid in the face with a paring knife and grabbing his AK-47 away from him before being shot. Romano was then tortured by the terrorists before bleeding to death. The terrorists cut off his genitals in front of the other prisoners. Romano's bloodied corpse was left at the feet of his teammates all day. The other nine Israeli athletes were killed during a bungled German rescue attempt later that night.

After the death of her son, Romano's mother died by suicide. Several years later his brother did as well.

Romano was portrayed by actor and producer Sam Feuer in the 2005 film, Munich, which was directed by Steven Spielberg. The film portrays Romano as having an opportunity to escape out a window after the struggle caused by Weinberg, but hesitating when he sees a knife lying on the floor, ultimately choosing to attack the terrorists instead. After viewing the movie, Ilana Romano, Yossef's widow, said: "We don't have a problem with it; the opposite, we are glad that people are being reminded of what happened in Munich so it will never happen again".

Ilana Romano fought unsuccessfully for a moment of silence to be held at the 2012 Summer Olympics in memory of the Israeli athletes murdered forty years prior. In 2014, however, the International Olympic Committee agreed to contribute $250,000 towards a memorial to the dead Israeli athletes.
