= Moshe Weinberg =

Israeli wrestler and wrestling coach (1939–72)

- משה ויינברג
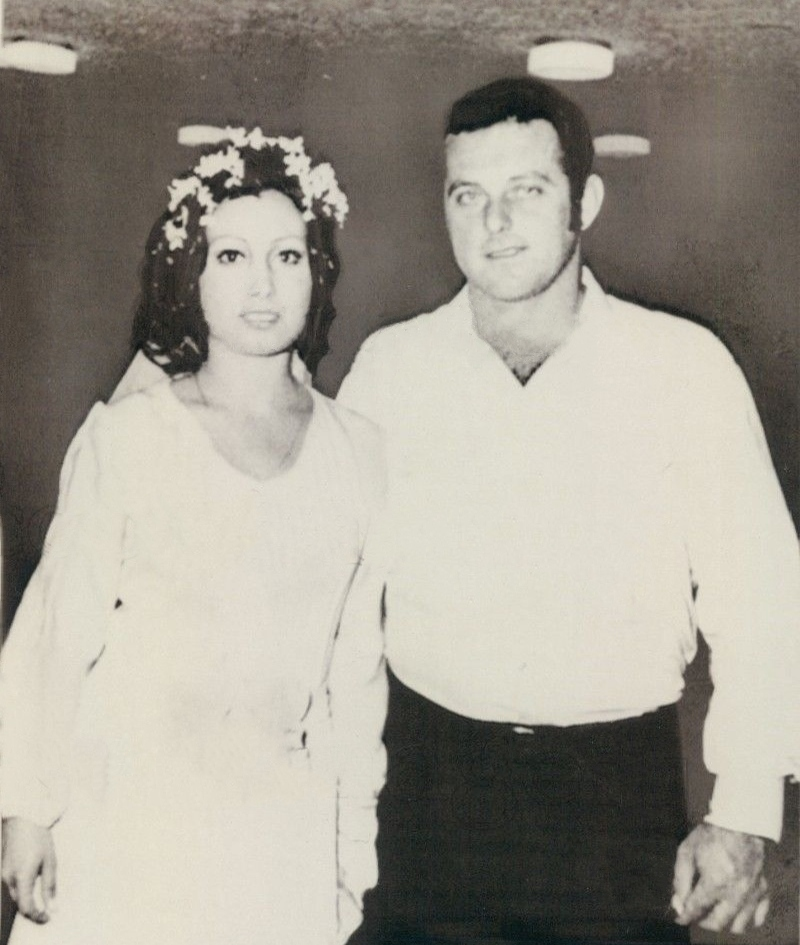
- Weinberg with his wife in 1971
- Born: 19 September 1939; Haifa, British Mandate of Palestine
- Died: 5 September 1972 (aged 32); Munich, West Germany
- Cause of death: Gunshot wound by Black September Organization
- Occupation: Wrestler coach
- Known for: Munich massacre
- Children: Guri Weinberg

Moshe Weinberg (Hebrew: משה ויינברג sometimes Weinberger; 19 September 1939 – 5 September 1972) was an Israeli wrestler who was the coach of the national team, as well as the coach of Hapoel Tel Aviv.

He began his career in Hapoel Haifa. He was the Israeli youth champion in wrestling. He was also the adult wrestling middleweight champion for eight years. At the 1965 Maccabiah Games, he won a gold medal in Greco-Roman wrestling.

He later became a certified coach at the Wingate Institute, and served in that role for five years.

In his capacity as a national wrestling coach, he was sent to the 1972 Summer Olympics in Munich. He was among 11 Israeli team members who were killed by Palestinian terrorists in what is known as "the Munich massacre".

== Death ==
In the early morning hours of 5 September 1972, eight members of Black September entered the Olympic Village, Munich. They broke into apartment 1 at Connollystraße 31, which housed five coaches and two referees of the Israeli Olympic team. As the terrorists broke into the apartment, Weinberg was confronted by the group's leader, Luttif Afif, whose own mother was Jewish and whose father was a wealthy Arab-Christian businessman from Nazareth, in a nearby bedroom. Weinberg picked up a nearby fruit knife and was shot through his cheek after slashing Afif, slicing his left breast pocket open but not reaching through to the flesh.

The wounded Weinberg was ordered by the terrorists at gunpoint to show them where the Israelis were. Weinberg led the terrorists past Apartment 2, which housed the fencers, shooters and track athletes, and instead took them to Apartment 3, which housed Israel's weightlifters and wrestlers.

However, taken by surprise, the six athletes of Apartment 3 were captured by the terrorists. While the hostages were being marched back to the officials' apartment, Weinberg once again attacked the intruders, knocking one of them, Mohammed Safady, unconscious and allowing one of his wrestlers, Gad Tsobari, to escape via an underground parking garage. The terrorists fatally shot Weinberg, then threw his body into the street. In moving the hostages to the coaches' apartment, the terrorists killed weightlifter Yossef Romano after he attempted to resist the terrorists. The nine remaining hostages were also subsequently killed in what became known as the Munich massacre. Atif and four other terrorists were killed by German snipers on 6 September.

Weinberg’s cousin, Edward Carmel Eliash — who was, at the time of the 1972 Olympics in Munich, Mayor of Tirat Carmel (Hebrew: טִירַת כַּרְמֶל), or Tirat HaCarmel, a city in the Haifa District in Israel — suffered a heart attack at the public memorial ceremony the following day at the Olympics.

Weinberg's actor son, Guri Weinberg, portrayed his father in the 2005 movie Munich.
