= List of alleged operations by Mossad =

List of Israeli intelligence operations

Mossad has been linked to a large number of covert operations since the 1950s, including espionage, sabotage, targeted killings, cyber warfare, and the covert emigration of Jewish communities. The agency rarely confirm or deny its activities, and most operations attributed to it are known only through leaks, foreign intelligence assessments, memoirs of former officers, journalism and, rarely, through subsequent official acknowledgement. Many attributions remain unproven.

== Africa ==
=== Egypt ===
- 1956: Provision of intelligence for the cutting of communications between Port Said and Cairo.
- 1957: Mossad spy Wolfgang Lotz, holding West German citizenship, infiltrated Egypt in 1957, and gathered intelligence on Egyptian missile sites, military installations, and industries. He also composed a list of German rocket scientists working for the Egyptian government, and sent some of them letter bombs. After the East German head of state made a state visit to Egypt, the Egyptian government detained thirty West German citizens as a goodwill gesture. Lotz, assuming that he had been discovered, confessed to his Cold War espionage activities.
- 1967: After a tense confrontation with CIA Tel Aviv station chief John Hadden on May 25, 1967, who warned that the United States would help defend Egypt if Israel launched a surprise attack, Mossad director Meir Amit flew to Washington, D.C. to meet with U.S. Defense Secretary Robert McNamara and reported back to the Israeli cabinet that the United States had given Israel "a flickering green light" to attack.
- Provision of intelligence on the Egyptian Air Force for Operation Focus, the opening air strike of the Six-Day War.
- Operation Bulmus 6 – Intelligence assistance in the Commando Assault on Green Island, Egypt during the War of Attrition.
- Operation Damocles – A campaign of assassination and intimidation against German rocket scientists employed by Egypt in building missiles.
  - A letter bomb sent to the Heliopolis rocket factory killed five Egyptian workers, allegedly sent by Otto Skorzeny on behalf of the Mossad.
  - Heinz Krug, 49, the chief of a Munich company supplying military hardware to Egypt disappeared in September 1962 and is believed to have been assassinated by Otto Skorzeny on behalf of the Mossad.

=== Morocco ===
- 1956: In September 1956, Mossad established a secretive network in Morocco to smuggle Moroccan Jews to Israel after a ban on immigration to Israel was imposed.
- 1991: In early 1991, two Mossad operatives infiltrated the Moroccan port of Casablanca and planted a tracking device on the freighter Al-Yarmouk, which was carrying a cargo of North Korean missiles bound for Syria. The ship was to be sunk by the Israeli Air Force, but the mission was later called off by Prime Minister Yitzhak Rabin.

=== Tunisia ===
- 1988: The killing of Khalil al-Wazir (Abu Jihad), a founder of Fatah.
- 1991: The alleged killing of Salah Khalaf, head of intelligence of the PLO and second in command of Fatah behind Yasser Arafat.
- 2016: The alleged killing of Hamas operative Mohamed Zouari in Sfax. Known to Israel's security echelon as "The Engineer", he was a Hamas-affiliated engineer who was believed to be constructing drones for the group. He was shot at close range.

=== Uganda ===
- 1976: For Operation Entebbe, Mossad provided intelligence regarding Entebbe International Airport and extensively interviewed hostages who had been released.

=== South Africa ===
In the late 1990s, after Mossad was tipped off to the presence of two Iranian agents in Johannesburg on a mission to procure advanced weapons systems from Denel, a Mossad agent was deployed, and met up with a local Jewish contact. Posing as South African intelligence, they abducted the Iranians, drove them to a warehouse, and beat and intimidated them before forcing them to leave the country.

=== Sudan ===
After the 1994 AMIA bombing, the largest bombing in Argentine history, Mossad began gathering intelligence for a raid by Israeli Special Forces on the Iranian embassy in Khartoum as retaliation. The operation was called off due to fears that another attack against worldwide Jewish communities might take place as revenge.

Mossad also assisted in Operation Moses, the evacuation of Ethiopian Jews to Israel from a famine-ridden region of Sudan in 1984, maintaining a relationship with the Ethiopian government.

== Americas ==
=== Argentina ===
In 1960, Mossad discovered that the Nazi leader Adolf Eichmann was in Argentina. A team of five Mossad agents led by Shimon Ben Aharon slipped into Argentina and, through surveillance, confirmed that he had been living there under the name of Ricardo Klement. He was abducted on May 11, 1960, and taken to a hideout. He was subsequently smuggled to Israel, where he was tried and executed. Argentina protested what it considered as a violation of its sovereignty, and the United Nations Security Council noted that "repetition of acts such as [this] would involve a breach of the principles upon which international order is founded, creating an atmosphere of insecurity and distrust incompatible with the preservation of peace" while also acknowledging that "Eichmann should be brought to appropriate justice for the crimes of which he is accused" and that "this resolution should in no way be interpreted as condoning the odious crimes of which Eichmann is accused." (Note: Argentina claimed that the "illicit and clandestine transfer of Eichmann from Argentine territory constitutes a flagrant violation of the Argentine State's right of sovereignty[.]" In Eichmann's case, the most salient feature from the perspective of international law was the fact of Israeli law enforcement action in another state's territory without consent; the human element includes the dramatic circumstances of the capture by Mossad agents and the ensuing custody and transfer to Israel[.] At its most obvious level this means that the exercise of enforcement jurisdiction within the territory of another state will be a violation of territorial integrity. For example, after Adolf Eichmann [...] was abducted from Argentina by a group of Israelis, now known to be from the Israeli Secret Service (Mossad), the Argentine Government lodged a complaint with the UN Security Council [...] It is however unclear whether as a matter of international law the obligation to make reparation for a violation of territorial sovereignty such as that involved in the Eichmann case includes an obligation to return the offender.) Mossad abandoned a second operation, intended to capture Josef Mengele.

=== United States ===
- 1983: Shortly after Rafael Eitan visited Inslaw in February 1983, the software PROMIS was allegedly stolen and copied by the United States Department of Justice, which triggered years of litigation. Earl W. Brian and Edwin Meese, two men with close ties to Reagan, are said to have sold or given the software to over 80 countries, with a "back door" built into the program, which allowed for espionage. Two versions of the software are said to have been sold: an American one for the CIA and an Israeli one for the Mossad. The software with the built-in back door is said to have reached the KGB via the British publisher Robert Maxwell, a Mossad agent. Maxwell was also able to sell the bugged Israeli version of PROMIS to Sandia National Laboratories and Los Alamos National Laboratory, two of the most important nuclear research and national security facilities in the United States. He is said to have been assisted by John Tower.
- 1987: After the 1987 arrest of Israeli spy Jonathan Pollard, wiretaps pointed to a high-level Israeli spy in the U.S. known as "Mega". Mega may have been a group of people (possibly the Mega/Study Group, alleged to be connected to Israeli intelligence).
- 1990s: During the 1990s, Mossad discovered that a Hezbollah agent was operating inside the United States to procure materials needed to manufacture IEDs and other weapons. In a joint operation with U.S. intelligence, the Hezbollah agent was kept under surveillance in hopes that his communications would expose additional Hezbollah operatives. The agent was eventually arrested.
- 1998: According to journalist Daniel Halper, Israel blackmailed US President Bill Clinton in 1998 with the release of incriminating conversations with Monica Lewinsky in order to secure the release of Israeli spy Jonathan Pollard. Israel is said to have obtained the Lewinsky recordings by monitoring White House phone lines.
- 2001: Mossad informed the FBI and CIA in August 2001 that, based on its intelligence, as many as 200 terrorists were slipping into the United States and planning "a major assault on the United States". The Israeli intelligence agency cautioned the FBI that it had picked up indications of a "large-scale target" in the United States and that Americans would be "very vulnerable". However, "It is not known whether U.S. authorities thought the warning to be credible, or whether it contained enough details to allow counter-terrorism teams to come up with a response." A month later, terrorists struck at the World Trade Center and the Pentagon in the largest terrorist attack in history.

In May 2014, an NSA document obtained by Edward Snowden and published by journalist Glenn Greenwald revealed that the CIA was concerned that Israel had established an extensive espionage network in the United States.

The US journalists Dylan Howard, Melissa Cronin and James Robertson linked the Mossad to American sex offender Jeffrey Epstein in their book Epstein: Dead Men Tell No Tales. They relied for the most part on the former Israeli intelligence officer Ari Ben-Menashe. According to him, Epstein's activities as a spy served to gather compromising material on powerful people in order to blackmail them. There is also a possible connection to the Mossad via Ghislaine Maxwell, whose father Robert Maxwell is said to have had contacts with the Mossad. Epstein's victim Virginia Giuffre also alleged Epstein to be an intelligence asset, linking on Twitter to a Reddit page, that alleged Epstein being a spy, running a blackmail operation.

=== Uruguay ===
- 1965: In 1965, the Mossad assassinated Latvian Nazi collaborator Herberts Cukurs.

== Asia ==
=== Central Asia and the Middle East ===
A report published on the Israeli military's official website in February 2014 said that Middle Eastern countries that cooperate with Israel (Mossad) are the United Arab Emirates, Afghanistan, the Republic of Azerbaijan, Bahrain and Saudi Arabia. The report claimed that Bahrain has been providing Israel with intelligence on Iranian and Palestinian organizations. The report also highlights the growing secret cooperation with Saudi Arabia, claiming that Mossad has been in direct contact with Saudi intelligence about Iran's nuclear energy program.

=== Iran ===
Prior to the Iranian Revolution of 1978–79, SAVAK (Organization of National Security and Information), the Iranian secret police and intelligence service was created under the guidance of United States and Israeli intelligence officers in 1957. After security relations between the United States and Iran grew more distant in the early 1960s which led the CIA training team to leave Iran, Mossad became increasingly active in Iran, "training SAVAK personnel and carrying out a broad variety of joint operations with SAVAK."

A US intelligence official told The Washington Post that Israel orchestrated the defection of Iranian general Ali Reza Askari on February 7, 2007. This has been denied by Israeli spokesman Mark Regev. The Sunday Times reported that Askari had been a Mossad asset since 2003, and left only when his cover was about to be blown.

In 2010, a computer worm that was created to disrupt the operations of Iranian centrifuges used for uranium enrichment was found. The virus, Stuxnet, was allegedly created in a joint effort of CIA and Mossad in the Operation Olympic Games. According to The Atlantic, Operation Olympic Games is "probably the most significant covert manipulation of the electromagnetic spectrum since World War II, when cryptanalysts broke the Enigma cipher that allowed access to Nazi codes." The level of Mossad involvement is unknown.

Le Figaro claimed that Mossad was possibly behind a blast at the Iranian Revolutionary Guard's Imam Ali military base, on October 12, 2011. The explosion at the base killed 18 and injured 10 others. Among the dead was also general Hassan Tehrani Moghaddam, who served as the commander of the Revolutionary Guards' missile program and was a crucial figure in building Iran's long-range missile program. The base is believed to store long-range missiles, including the Shahab-3, and also has hangars. It is one of Iran's most secure military bases.

Mossad has been accused of assassinating Masoud Alimohammadi, Ardeshir Hosseinpour, Majid Shahriari, Darioush Rezaeinejad and Mostafa Ahmadi-Roshan; scientists involved in the Iranian nuclear program. It is also suspected of being behind the attempted assassination of Iranian nuclear scientist Fereydoon Abbasi. Meir Dagan, who served as Director of Mossad from 2002 until 2009, while not taking credit for the assassinations, praised them in an interview with a journalist, saying "the removal of important brains" from the Iranian nuclear project had achieved so-called "white defections", frightening other Iranian nuclear scientists into requesting that they be transferred to civilian projects.

In 2018, Mossad agents infiltrated Iran's secret nuclear archive in Tehran and smuggled over 100,000 documents and computer files to Israel. The documents and files showed that the Iranian AMAD Project aimed to develop nuclear weapons. Israel shared the information with its allies, including European countries and the United States.

On August 7, 2020, al-Qaeda's deputy leader Abdullah Ahmed Abdullah and his daughter were shot to death by two Mossad agents in Tehran.

In 2024, former Iranian President Mahmoud Ahmadinejad revealed that Iran's intelligence service had established a unit to counter Mossad operations, only for its leader to have been exposed as a Mossad agent in 2021. He also claimed that around 20 Iranian operatives had been acting as double agents, supplying intelligence to Israel.

Mossad has been accused of involvement during the 2025-2026 Iranian protests. In December 2025 and January 2026, a number of statements by high-ranking officials, including Mike Pompeo and the official Twitter account of Mossad in Farsi, acknowledged Mossad action during the 2025-2026 Iranian protests, with one statement saying: "We are with you — not just from afar and in words. We are with you on the ground as well".

During the 2025 war, Mossad agents allegedly assembled drones inside Iran for strikes. The March 2026 assassination of Khamenei was attributed to Mossad-U.S. collaboration; Mossad reportedly used cyber means to disrupt Iranian air defenses.

In July 2026, The New York Times and Haaretz reported that Mossad had spent three years, beginning around 2022, cultivating Ahmadinejad as an intelligence asset, with a plan to install him as leader of a post–Islamic Republic government in case the regime collapses. According to the reports, Mossad director David Barnea met Ahmadinejad personally in Budapest in 2024 under cover of a climate-change conference at the Ludovika University of Public Service, with a second meeting in June 2025, and Israel financed his housing and travel. Haaretz described the effort as one element of a wider plan, codenamed "Puss in Boots", that also envisaged arming Kurdish forces in northern Iraq, mobilising minorities and opening a militia corridor toward Tehran. The plan reportedly drew strong internal opposition from Military Intelligence chief Shlomi Binder, Research Division head Ofir Mizrahi Rosen and the national security adviser Tzachi Hanegbi, who is said to have called parts of it "science fiction".

On 28 February 2026, the day Ayatollah Ali Khamenei was killed, an Israeli airstrike hit Ahmadinejad's compound in Tehran's Narmak district, reportedly targeting his bodyguards rather than Ahmadinejad himself in order to free him from house arrest; he was wounded but survived and was extracted by Mossad operatives to a safe house, which he later left after growing disillusioned with the operation. The anticipated Kurdish uprising did not happen and the Iranian state retained control. Ahmadinejad was seen on 6 July 2026 at Khamenei's funeral, and four senior Iranian officials told The New York Times that he had since been placed under IRGC house arrest after his contacts with Israel were uncovered. Ahmadinejad's office rejected the reports as fabrication.

=== Iraq ===
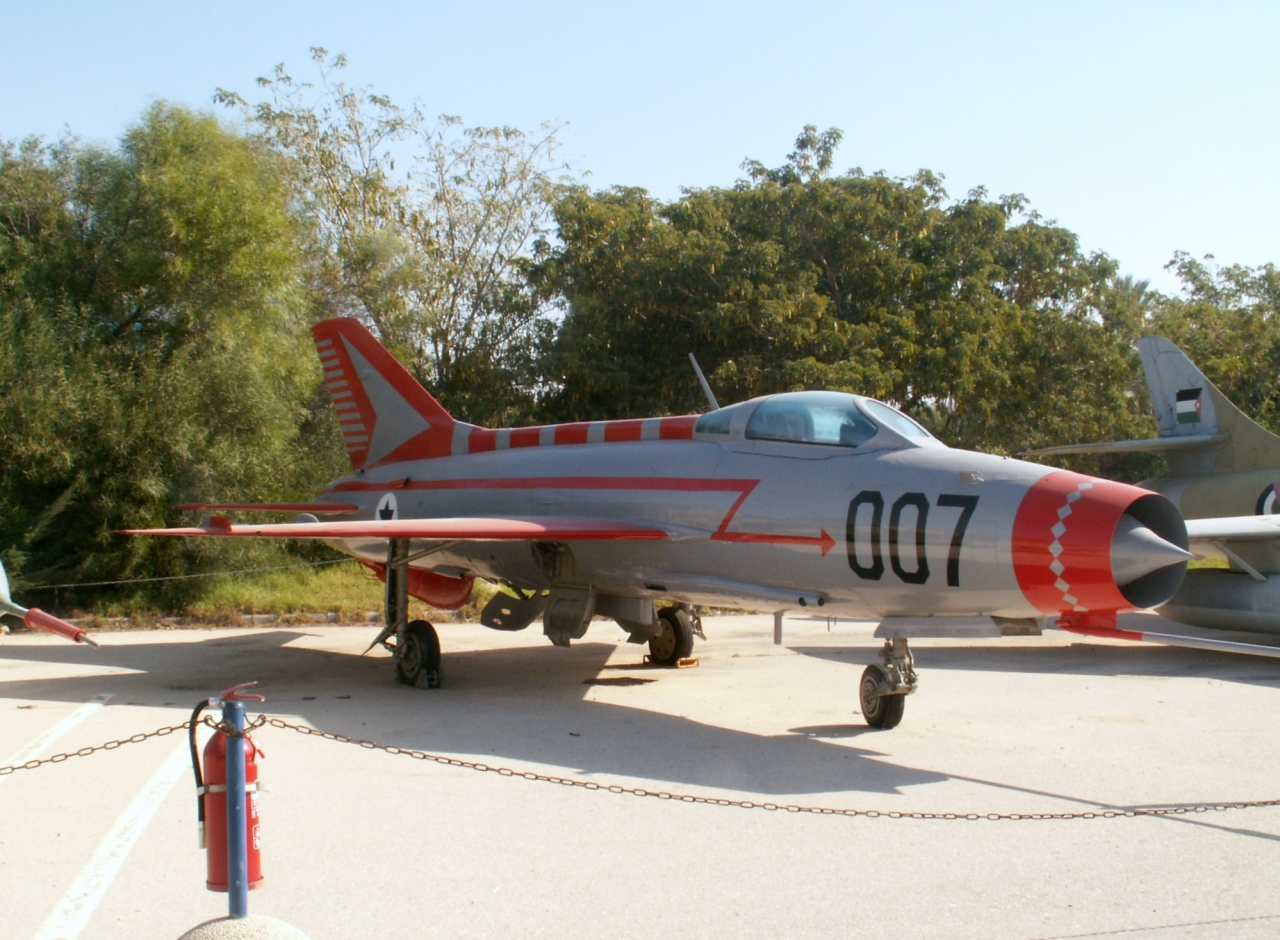
MiG-21 at the Israeli Air Force Museum in Hatzerim

Assistance in the defection and rescuing of the family of Munir Redfa, an Iraqi pilot who defected and flew his MiG-21 to Israel in 1966: "Operation Diamond". Redfa's entire family was also successfully smuggled from Iraq to Israel. Previously unknown information about the MiG-21 was subsequently shared with the United States.

Operation Sphinx – Between 1978 and 1981, obtained highly sensitive information about Iraq's Osirak nuclear reactor by recruiting an Iraqi nuclear scientist in France.

Operation Bramble Bush II – In the 1990s, Mossad began scouting locations in Iraq where Saddam Hussein could be ambushed by Sayeret Matkal commandos inserted into Iraq from Jordan. The mission was called off due to Operation Desert Fox and the ongoing Israeli-Arab peace process.

=== Jordan ===
In what is thought to have been a reprisal action for a Hamas suicide-bombing in Jerusalem on July 30, 1997, that killed 16 Israelis, Benjamin Netanyahu authorised an operation against Khaled Mashal, the Hamas representative in Jordan. On September 25, 1997, Mashal was injected in the ear with a toxin (thought to have been a derivative of the synthetic opiate Fentanyl called Levofentanyl). Jordanian authorities apprehended two Mossad agents posing as Canadian tourists and trapped a further six in the Israeli embassy. In exchange for their release, an Israeli physician had to fly to Amman and deliver an antidote for Mashal. The fallout from the failed killing eventually led to the release of Sheik Ahmed Yassin, the founder and spiritual leader of the Hamas movement, and scores of Hamas prisoners. Netanyahu flew into Amman on September 29 to apologize personally to King Hussein, but he was instead met by the King's brother, Crown Prince Hassan.

=== Lebanon ===
The sending of letter bombs to PFLP member Bassam Abu Sharif in 1972. Sharif was severely wounded, but survived.

The killing of the Palestinian writer and leading PFLP member Ghassan Kanafani by a car bomb in 1972.

The provision of intelligence and operational assistance in the 1973 Operation Spring of Youth special forces raid on Beirut.

The targeted killing of Ali Hassan Salameh, the leader of Black September, on January 22, 1979, in Beirut by a car bomb.

Providing intelligence for the killing of Abbas al-Musawi, secretary general of Hezbollah, in southern Lebanon in 1992.

Allegedly killed Jihad Ahmed Jibril, the leader of the military wing of the PFLP-GC, in Beirut in 2002.

Allegedly killed Ali Hussein Saleh, member of Hezbollah, in Beirut in 2003.

Allegedly killed Ghaleb Awwali, a senior Hezbollah official, in Beirut in 2004.

Allegedly killed Mahmoud al-Majzoub, a leader of Palestinian Islamic Jihad, in Sidon in 2006.

Mossad was suspected of establishing a large spy network in Lebanon, recruited from Druze, Christian, and Sunni Muslim communities, and officials in the Lebanese government, to spy on Hezbollah and its Iranian Revolutionary Guard advisors. Some have allegedly been active since the 1982 Lebanon War. In 2009, Lebanese Security Services supported by Hezbollah's intelligence unit, and working in collaboration with Syria, Iran, and possibly Russia, launched a major crackdown which resulted in the arrests of around 100 alleged spies "working for Israel".

On 17 and 18 September 2024, thousands of handheld pagers and walkie-talkies used by Hezbollah exploded in two waves across Lebanon and Syria, in an attack of the Operation Grim Beeper. According to The New York Times, Mossad had secretly manufactured the devices, integrating the explosive PETN into their batteries, and sold them to Hezbollah through a shell company, Budapest-registered BAC Consulting Kft., which posed as a licensee of the Taiwanese manufacturer Gold Apollo; at least two further shell companies were created to cover the scheme. The pagers had been bought five months earlier, after Hezbollah's secretary-general Hassan Nasrallah instructed members to abandon mobile phones, out of fear that Israel hacked them. The operation was reported to have been planned over roughly a decade.

According to the Lebanese government the attacks killed 42 people, including 12 civilians, and injured more than 3,500. An unnamed Hezbollah official told Reuters that 1,500 fighters had been taken out of action by their injuries. The incident was described as Hezbollah's biggest security breach since the start of the conflict in October 2023. Ten days later Israel killed Nasrallah in an airstrike in Beirut.

Israel initially neither confirmed nor denied responsibility; in November 2024 Netanyahu acknowledged that he had approved the operation. The following month Israel permitted two Mossad officers involved in the operation to be interviewed, in disguise, on the American programme 60 Minutes; they said test dummies had been used to calibrate the charges so as to injure the person holding the device without harming bystanders, and that fake marketing videos had been produced to promote the pagers, with unattractive prices quoted to customers unconnected with Hezbollah.

=== Palestine ===
Caesarea tried for many years to assassinate Palestine Liberation Organization leader Yasser Arafat, a job later tasked by Israel's Minister of Defense Ariel Sharon to a military special ops task force code named "Salt Fish", later renamed "Operation Goldfish", specially created for the job of assassinating Arafat, with Ronan Bergman suggesting that Israel used radiation poisoning to kill Yasser Arafat.

=== Syria ===
Eli Cohen infiltrated the highest echelons of the Syrian government, was a close friend of the Syrian President, and was considered for the post of Minister of Defense. He gave his handlers a complete plan of the Syrian defenses on the Golan Heights, the Syrian Armed Forces order of battle, and a complete list of the Syrian military's weapons inventory. He also ordered the planting of trees by every Syrian fortified position under the pretext of shading soldiers, but the trees actually served as targeting markers for the Israel Defense Forces. He was discovered by Syrian and Soviet intelligence, tried in secret, and executed publicly in 1965. His information played a crucial role during the Six-Day War.

On April 1, 1978, 12 Syrian military and secret service personnel were killed by a booby trapped sophisticated Israeli listening device planted on the main telephone cable between Damascus and Jordan.

The alleged death of General Anatoly Kuntsevich, who from the late 1990s was suspected of aiding the Syrians in the manufacture of VX nerve-gas, in exchange for which he was paid huge amounts of money by the Syrian government. On April 3, 2002, Kuntsevich died mysteriously during a plane journey, amid allegations that Mossad was responsible.

The alleged killing of Izz El-Deen Sheikh Khalil, a senior member of the military wing of Hamas, in an automobile booby trap in September 2004 in Damascus.

The uncovering of a nuclear reactor being built in Syria as a result of surveillance by Mossad of Syrian officials working under the command of Muhammad Suleiman. As a result, the Syrian nuclear reactor was destroyed by Israeli Air Forces in September 2007 (see Operation Orchard).

The alleged killing of Muhammad Suleiman, head of Syria's nuclear program, in 2008. Suleiman was on a beach in Tartus and was killed by a sniper firing from a boat.

On July 25, 2007, the al-Safir chemical weapons depot exploded, killing 15 Syrian personnel as well as 10 Iranian engineers. Syrian investigations blamed Israeli sabotage.

The alleged killing of Imad Mughniyah, a senior leader of Hezbollah complicit in the 1983 United States embassy bombing, with an exploding headrest in Damascus in 2008.

The decomposed body of Yuri Ivanov, the deputy head of the GRU, Russia's foreign military intelligence service, was found on a Turkish beach in early August 2010, amid allegations that Mossad may have played a role. He had disappeared while staying near Latakia, Syria.

Mossad was accused of being behind the assassination of Aziz Asbar, a senior Syrian scientist responsible for developing long-range rockets and chemical weapons programs. He was killed in a car bomb in Masyaf on August 5, 2018.

=== United Arab Emirates ===
Mossad is suspected of killing Mahmoud al-Mabhouh, a senior Hamas military commander, in January 2010 at Dubai, United Arab Emirates. The team which carried out the killing is estimated, on the basis of CCTV and other evidence, to have consisted of at least 26 agents traveling on bogus passports. The operatives entered al-Mabhouh's hotel room, where Mabhouh was subjected to electric shocks and interrogated. The door to his room was reported to have been locked from the inside. Although the UAE police and Hamas have declared Israel responsible for the killing, no direct evidence linking Mossad to the crime has been found. The agents' bogus passports included six British passports, cloned from those of real British nationals resident in Israel and suspected by Dubai, five Irish passports, apparently forged from those of living individuals, forged Australian passports that raised fears of reprisal against innocent victims of identity theft, a genuine German passport and a false French passport. Emirati police say they have fingerprint and DNA evidence of some of the attackers, as well as retinal scans of 11 suspects recorded at Dubai airport. Dubai's police chief has said "I am now completely sure that it was Mossad," adding: "I have presented the (Dubai) prosecutor with a request for the arrest of (Israeli Prime Minister Benjamin) Netanyahu and the head of Mossad," for the murder.

=== South Asia and East/Southeast Asia ===
==== India ====
A Rediff story in 2003 revealed that Mossad had clandestine links with the Research and Analysis Wing (R&AW), India's external intelligence agency. When R&AW was founded in September 1968 by Rameshwar Nath Kao, he was advised by then Prime Minister Indira Gandhi to cultivate links with Mossad. This was suggested as a countermeasure to military links between that of Pakistan and China, as well as with North Korea. Israel was also concerned that Pakistani army officers were training Libyans and Iranians in handling Chinese and North Korean military equipment.

Pakistan believed intelligence relations between India and Israel threatened Pakistani security. When young Israeli tourists began visiting the Kashmir valley in the early 1990s, Pakistan suspected they were disguised Israeli army officers there to help Indian security forces with anti-terrorism operations. Israeli tourists were attacked, with one slain and another kidnapped. Pressure from the Kashmiri Muslim diaspora in the United States led to his release. Kashmiri Muslims feared that the attacks could isolate the American Jewish community, and result in them lobbying the US government against Kashmiri separatist groups.

India Today reported that the two flats were RAW safe houses used as operational fronts for Mossad agents and housed Mossad's station chief between 1989 and 1992. RAW had reportedly decided to have closer ties to Mossad, and the subsequent secret operation was approved by then Prime Minister Rajiv Gandhi. India Today cites "RAW insiders" as saying that RAW agents hid a Mossad agent holding an Argentine passport and exchanged intelligence and expertise in operations, including negotiations for the release of an Israeli tourist by the Jammu and Kashmir Liberation Front militants in June 1991. When asked about the case Verma refused to speak about the companies, but claimed his relationship with them was purely professional. Raman stated, "Sometimes, spy agencies float companies for operational reasons. All I can say is that everything was done with government approval. Files were cleared by the then prime minister Rajiv Gandhi and his cabinet secretary. Balachandran stated, "It is true that we did a large number of operations but at every stage, we kept the Cabinet Secretariat and the prime minister in the loop."

In November 2015, The Times of India reported that agents from Mossad and MI5 were protecting Prime Minister Narendra Modi during his visit to Turkey. Modi was on a state visit to the United Kingdom and was scheduled to attend the 2015 G-20 Summit in Antalya, Turkey. The paper reported that the agents had been called in to provide additional cover to Modi's security detail, composed of India's Special Protection Group and secret agents from RAW and IB, in wake of the November 2015 Paris attacks.

==== Malaysia ====
In 2018, Hamas and the family of Malaysian-based Hamas engineer and university lecturer Fadi Mohammad al-Batsh have accused the Mossad of assassinating him. In April 2018, al-Batsh was shot dead by two men on a motorbike in Kuala Lumpur. Malaysian Deputy Prime Minister Ahmad Zahid Hamidi described the suspects as Europeans with links to an unidentified foreign intelligence agency. In response, Israeli Defense Minister Avigdor Lieberman denied that Mossad was involved in al-Batsh's assassination and suggested that his death was the result of an internal Palestinian dispute. Hamas also issued a statement describing Batsh as a "martyr" and "distinguished scientist who has widely contributed to the energy sector."

In October 2022, the New Straits Times and Al Jazeera Arabic reported that several Malaysian Mossad operatives had attempted to kidnap two Palestinian computer experts in Kuala Lumpur in late September 2022. Though they managed to kidnap one of the men, the second escaped and alerted Malaysian police. The operatives allegedly assisted Mossad officials via video call in interrogating and beating their captive, who was questioned about the computer programming and software capabilities of Hamas and its Izz ad-Din al-Qassam Brigades. With the aid of the second Palestinian man, Malaysian police were able to track down the car registration plates to a house where the alleged kidnappers were arrested and the man was freed. According to Al Jazeera Arabic, a "well-informed Malaysian source" claimed that an investigation had uncovered an undercover 11-member Mossad cell in Malaysia that was involved in spying on important sites including airports, government electronic companies, and tracking down Palestinian activists. This Mossad cell allegedly consisted of Malaysian nationals who received training in Europe.

==== North Korea ====
Mossad may have been involved in the 2004 explosion of Ryongchon, where several Syrian nuclear scientists working on the Syrian and Iranian nuclear-weapons programs were killed and a train carrying fissionable material was destroyed.

==== Pakistan ====
In a September 2003 news article, it was alleged by Rediff News that General Pervez Musharraf, the then-president of Pakistan, decided to establish a clandestine relationship between Inter-Services Intelligence (ISI) and Mossad via officers of the two services posted at their embassies in Washington, DC.

==== Sri Lanka ====
Mossad had allegedly helped both Sri Lanka and the Eelam. Mossad agent Victor Ostrovsky claimed that Mossad trained both the Sri Lankan armed forces and the LTTE while keeping the two separated. Ravi Jayewardene, head of the STF, had toured Israel in 1984 and took inspiration from the Israeli settlements in the Palestinian Territories to form armed Sinhalese settlements in strategic border areas of the Tamil-dominant Northern and Eastern provinces.

== Europe ==
=== Austria ===
In 1954, after Mossad received intelligence that an Israeli officer who had access to classified military technologies, Major Alexander Israel, had approached Egyptian officials in Europe and offered to sell Israeli military secrets and documents, a team of Mossad and Shin Bet officers was quickly sent to Europe to locate him and abduct him, and located him in Vienna. The mission was code-named Operation Bren. A female agent managed to lure him to a meeting through a honey trap operation, and he was subsequently kidnapped, sedated, and flown to Israel aboard a waiting Israeli military plane. However, the plane had to make several refueling stops, and he was given an additional dose of sedatives each time, which ultimately caused him to overdose, killing him. Upon arrival in Israel, after it was discovered that he was dead, he was given a burial at sea, and the case remained highly classified for decades.

Mossad gathered information on Austrian politician Jörg Haider using a mole.

=== Belgium ===
Mossad is alleged to be responsible for the killing of Canadian engineer and ballistics expert Gerald Bull on March 22, 1990. He was shot multiple times in the head outside his Brussels apartment. Bull was at the time working for Iraq on the Project Babylon supergun. Others, including Bull's son, believe that Mossad is taking credit for an act they did not commit to scare off others who may try to help enemy regimes. The alternative theory is that Bull was killed by the CIA. Iraq and Iran are also candidates for suspicion.

=== Bosnia and Herzegovina ===
Provided Bosnian Serbs with artillery shells and other ammunition in return for air and overland evacuations of Bosnian Jews from war-torn Sarajevo to Israel in 1992 and 1993.

=== Cyprus ===
The killing of Hussein Al Bashir in Nicosia, Cyprus, in 1973 in relation to the Munich massacre.

=== France ===
Mossad allegedly assisted Morocco's domestic security service in the disappearance of dissident politician Mehdi Ben Barka in 1965.

Cherbourg Project – Operation Noa, the 1969 smuggling of five Sa'ar 3-class missile boats out of Cherbourg.

The killing of Mahmoud Hamshari, alleged coordinator of the Munich massacre, with an exploding telephone in his Paris apartment in 1972.

The killing of Basil Al Kubaisi, who was involved in the Munich massacre, in Paris in 1973.

The killing of Mohamed Boudia, member of the PFLP, in Paris in 1973.

On April 5, 1979, Mossad agents are believed to have triggered an explosion which destroyed 60 percent of components being built in Toulouse for an Iraqi reactor. Although an environmental organization, Groupe des écologistes français, unheard of before this incident, claimed credit for the blast, most French officials discount the claim. The reactor itself was subsequently destroyed by an Israeli air strike in 1981.

The alleged killing of Zuheir Mohsen, a pro-Syrian member of the PLO, in 1979.

The killing of Yehia El-Mashad, the head of the Iraq nuclear weapons program, in 1980.

The alleged killing of Atef Bseiso, a top intelligence officer of the PLO, in Paris in 1992. French police believe that a team of assassins followed Atef Bseiso from Berlin, where that first team connected with another team to close in on him in front of a Left Bank hotel, where he received three head-shots at point blank range.

=== Germany ===
Operation Plumbat (1968) was an operation by Lekem-Mossad to further Israel's nuclear program. The German freighter "Scheersberg A" disappeared on its way from Antwerp to Genoa along with its cargo of 200 tons of yellowcake, after supposedly being transferred to an Israeli ship.

The sending of letter bombs during the assassination campaign. Some of these attacks were not fatal. Their purpose might not have been to kill the receiver. A Mossad letter bomb led to fugitive Nazi war-criminal Alois Brunner's losing four fingers from his right hand in 1980. Years earlier, on 25 September 1963, the Mossad tried to kill SS-Hauptsturmführer and concentration camp doctor Hans Eisele with a mail bomb. However, the bomb detonated early, instead killing a postal worker.

The alleged targeted killing of Wadie Haddad, using poisoned chocolate. Haddad died on 28 March 1978, in the German Democratic Republic supposedly from leukemia. According to the book Striking Back, published by Aharon Klein in 2006, Haddad was eliminated by Mossad, which had sent the chocolate-loving Haddad Belgian chocolates coated with a slow-acting and undetectable poison which caused him to die several months later. "It took him a few long months to die", Klein said in the book.

Mossad discovered that Hezbollah had recruited a German national named Steven Smyrek, and that he was travelling to Israel. In an operation conducted by Mossad, the CIA, the German Internal Security agency Bundesamt für Verfassungsschutz (BfV), and the Israeli Internal Security agency Shin Bet, Smyrek was kept under constant surveillance, and arrested as soon as he landed in Israel.

=== Greece ===
The killing of Zaiad Muchasi, Fatah representative to Cyprus, by an explosion in his Athens hotel room in 1973.

=== Ireland ===
The assassination of Mahmoud Al-Mabhouh – a senior Hamas military commander – in Dubai, 2010, was suspected to be the work of Mossad, and there were eight Irish passports (six of which were used) fraudulently obtained by the Israeli embassy in Dublin, Ireland for use by alleged Mossad agents in the operation. The Irish government was angered over the use of Irish passports, summoned the Israeli ambassador for an explanation and expelled the Israeli diplomat deemed responsible from Dublin, following an investigation. One of the passports was registered to a residence on Pembroke Road, Ballsbridge, on the same road as the Israeli embassy. The house was empty when later searched, but there was suspicion by Irish authorities it had been used as a Mossad safe house in the past. Mossad is reported to have a working relationship with the Irish military intelligence service and has previously tipped the Irish authorities off about arms shipments from the Middle East to Ireland for use by dissident republican militants, resulting in their interception and arrests.

=== Italy ===
The killing of Wael Zwaiter, thought to be a member of Black September.

In 1986, Mossad used an undercover agent to lure Mordechai Vanunu, in a honey trap style operation, from the United Kingdom to Italy. There, he was abducted and returned to Israel, where he was tried and found guilty of treason because of his role in exposing Israel's nuclear weapons programme.

=== Malta ===
The killing of Fathi Shiqaqi. Shiqaqi, a leader of the Palestinian Islamic Jihad, was shot several times in the head in 1995 in front of the Diplomat Hotel in Sliema, Malta.

=== Norway ===
On July 21, 1973, Ahmed Bouchiki, a Moroccan waiter in Lillehammer, Norway, was killed by Mossad agents. He had been mistaken for Ali Hassan Salameh, one of the leaders of Black September, the Palestinian group responsible for the Munich massacre, who had been given shelter in Norway. Mossad agents had used fake Canadian passports, which angered the Canadian government. Six Mossad agents were arrested, and the incident came to be known as the Lillehammer affair. Israel subsequently paid compensation to Bouchiki's family.

=== Switzerland ===
According to secret CIA and US State Department documents discovered by the Iranian students who took over the U.S. Embassy in Tehran on November 4, 1979:

In Switzerland the Israelis have an Embassy in Bern and a Consulate-General in Zürich which provide cover for Collection Department officers involved in unilateral operations. These Israeli diplomatic installations also maintain close relations with the Swiss on a local level in regard to overt functions such as physical security for Israeli official and commercial installations in the country and the protection of staff members and visiting Israelis. There is also close collaboration between the Israelis and Swiss on scientific and technical matters pertaining to intelligence and security operations. Swiss officials have made frequent trips to Israel. There is a continual flow of Israelis to and through Switzerland. These visits, however, are usually arranged through the Political Action and Liaison regional controller at the Embassy in Paris directly with the Swiss and not through the officials in the Israeli Embassy in Bern, although the latter are kept informed.

In February 1998, five Mossad agents were caught wiretapping the home of a Hezbollah agent in a Bern suburb. Four agents were freed, but the fifth was tried, found guilty, sentenced to one year in prison, and following his release was banned from entering Switzerland for five years.

=== Soviet Union ===
Mossad was involved in outreach to refuseniks in the Soviet Union during the crackdown on Soviet Jews in the period between the 1950s and the 1980s. Mossad helped establish contact with Refuseniks in the USSR, and helped them acquire Jewish religious items, banned by the Soviet government, in addition to passing communications into and out of the USSR. Many rabbinical students from Western countries travelled to the Soviet Union as part of this program in order to establish and maintain contact with refuseniks.

=== United Kingdom ===
In 1984, Mossad agents were caught attempting to kidnap Nigerian politician Umaru Dikko from London. On July 4, 1984, customs officials at Stansted airport discovered Dikko in a crate that was about to be flown to Nigeria. Agents Alexander Barak, Felix Abithol, and anesthetist Dr. Levi-Arie Shapiro were given prison sentences of between ten and fourteen years.

In 1986, a bag containing eight forged British passports was discovered in a telephone booth in West Germany. The passports had been the work of Mossad and were intended for the Israeli Embassy in London for use in covert operations. The British government, furious, demanded that Israel give a promise not forge its passports again, which was obtained.

On June 15, 1988, following the trial and conviction of a Palestinian post-graduate student, Ismail Sowan, who was studying at Hull University, two Mossad agents were expelled from the UK. Sowan was found in possession of a large arms cache and sentenced to eleven years in prison. During his trial, it was revealed that he had been employed by Mossad for ten years. Mossad agents Arie Regev and Jacob Barad were Sowan's controllers. They had failed to inform MI6 of Sowan's activities and that they were aware that a Palestinian (Abd al-Rahim Mustapha – who was believed to be involved in the assassination of Naji al-Ali) had entered the country illegally. The Mossad station in the UK remained closed until the 1994 bombing of the Israeli Embassy in London.

=== Ukraine ===
In February 2011, a Palestinian engineer, Dirar Abu Seesi, was allegedly pulled off a train by Mossad agents en route to the capital Kyiv from Kharkiv. He had been planning to apply for Ukrainian citizenship, and reappeared in an Israeli jail only three weeks after the incident.

== Oceania ==
=== New Zealand ===
In July 2004, New Zealand imposed diplomatic sanctions on Israel over an incident in which two Australia-based Israelis, Uriel Kelman and Eli Cara, who were allegedly working for Mossad, attempted to fraudulently obtain New Zealand passports by claiming the identity of a severely disabled man. Israeli Foreign Minister Silvan Shalom later apologized to New Zealand for their actions. New Zealand cancelled several other passports believed to have been obtained by Israeli agents. Both Kelman and Cara served half of their six-month sentences and, upon release, were deported to Israel. Two others, an Israeli, Ze'ev Barkan, and a New Zealander, David Reznick, are believed to have been the third and fourth men involved in the passport affair but they both managed to leave New Zealand before being apprehended.

== International ==
2001: together with the legal group Shurat HaDin, Mossad started Operation Harpoon, for "destroying terrorists' money networks".

=== International Criminal Court ===
According to The Guardian, Mossad reportedly conducted an effort to derail the investigation by the International Criminal Court (ICC) of Israeli actions in the Palestinian territories. Fatou Bensouda, Prosecutor of the ICC, alleged that she and her family were victims of a campaign by Mossad director Yossi Cohen to dissuade her from opening prosecution of Israeli officials for war crimes. The reportage claimed that between late 2019 and early 2021, there were at least three encounters between Cohen and Bensouda, in which Cohen attempted at first to get Bensouda to co-operate with Israel and later to persuade her not to pursue a full investigation. U.S. Secretary of State Mike Pompeo responded to the Israel investigation by accusing the ICC of "only putting Israel in [its] crosshairs for nakedly political purposes" and Bensouda of having "engaged in corrupt acts for her personal benefit".

== Domestic ==
In 1960, Mossad was asked to assist in the Yossele Schumacher affair, an abduction of 8 year old boy by his Haredi relatives who wanted to prevent him being raised secular. Prime Minister David Ben-Gurion asked the Mossad to investigate. Mossad Director-General Isser Harel assembled a team of forty agents, but due to their unfamiliarity with the traditions and nuances of Haredi life, they were swiftly unmasked in their attempts to infiltrate the Haredi world. As the search for Schumacher proved fruitless, Harel became convinced that the child had been smuggled abroad and was probably somewhere in Europe. Subsequently, the Mossad began searching for Schumacher internationally, and Harel moved his operations headquarters to a Mossad safe-house in Paris, and sent agents to infiltrate Haredi communities throughout France, Italy, Austria, and the United Kingdom, then expanded the search to South America and the United States, but their efforts to infiltrate these communities proved difficult.
