= Mossad activities in Iran =

Operations of the Israeli intelligence agency

Mossad activities in Iran refer to the operations conducted by Israel's foreign intelligence agency, the Mossad, within or targeting the Islamic Republic of Iran. These activities have primarily focused on Iran's nuclear program, military infrastructure, and senior officials, amid longstanding tensions in Iran–Israel relations. Reports from various sources indicate that Mossad has engaged in espionage, sabotage, cyber attacks, and targeted assassinations, often in collaboration with other entities such as the United States intelligence community. Iranian officials have repeatedly accused Israel of these actions, while Israel rarely confirms or denies involvement, maintaining a policy of ambiguity.

The operations are part of a broader Iran–Israel proxy conflict, which has escalated since the early 2000s. Key events include the joint U.S.-Israeli Stuxnet cyber attack on Iranian nuclear facilities around 2010, the theft of Iran's nuclear archive in 2018, and a series of assassinations of Iranian nuclear scientists between 2010 and 2025. More recent activities reportedly played a role in the 2025 Israel–Iran War, including the assembly of drones and missiles inside Iran and the targeted killings of high-ranking Iranian figures, such as Supreme Leader Ali Khamenei in March 2026. These efforts have been credited with delaying Iran's nuclear ambitions but have also heightened regional instability.

== Background ==
The Mossad, formally the Institute for Intelligence and Special Operations, was established in 1949 to conduct espionage, sabotage, and targeted killings outside Israel. Iran's nuclear program, initiated under the Shah in the 1950s, became a focal point of Israeli concern after the 1979 Iranian Revolution, when Iran shifted toward anti-Israel policies and supported groups like Hezbollah. By the 2000s, Israel viewed Iran's potential nuclear weapon as an existential threat, leading to intensified Mossad operations.

Iranian accusations of Israeli infiltration date back to the 1980s, but escalated with revelations of Mossad's role in disrupting Iran's nuclear efforts. These include recruitment of Iranian dissidents and use of neighboring countries for access. In response, Iran has executed individuals accused of spying for Israel, including nuclear scientist Rouzbeh Vadi in August 2025.

== Espionage and document theft ==
Mossad has been accused of conducting espionage to gather intelligence on Iran's nuclear program. A notable operation was the 2018 infiltration of a Tehran warehouse, where agents stole over 100,000 documents detailing Iran's past nuclear weapons research under the AMAD Project. Israeli Prime Minister Benjamin Netanyahu presented the files publicly, claiming they proved Iran lied about its nuclear ambitions.

Further espionage involved recruiting informants within Iran's security apparatus. Reports indicate Mossad maintained safe houses in Iran dating to the pre-1979 era and used Kurdish regions in Iraq for entry. In 2022, Iranian officials acknowledged deep Mossad penetration into their intelligence ranks.

Mossad has been accused of involvement during the 2025-2026 Iranian protests. In December 2025 and January 2026, a number of statements by high-ranking officials, including Mike Pompeo and the official Twitter account of Mossad in Farsi, acknowledged Mossad action during the 2025-2026 Iranian protests, with one statement saying: "We are with you — not just from afar and in words. We are with you on the ground as well".

== Cyber operations ==
Mossad, in collaboration with U.S. agencies, has been linked to cyber sabotage against Iran's nuclear infrastructure. The most prominent was Stuxnet, a malware that damaged centrifuges at the Natanz facility around 2010. This operation, reportedly part of "Operation Olympic Games," delayed Iran's uranium enrichment.

Subsequent cyber attacks targeted Natanz in 2021 and other sites, attributed to Israel. During the 2025 Israel–Iran War, Mossad reportedly used cyber means to disrupt Iranian air defenses.

== Assassinations and sabotage ==
Mossad has been accused of assassinating Iranian nuclear scientists and officials. Between 2010 and 2020, at least five scientists were killed in operations using remote-controlled weapons or bombs. The 2020 killing of Mohsen Fakhrizadeh involved a remote machine gun.

Sabotage operations include explosions at missile bases, such as the 2011 blast that killed a key missile program architect, denied by Iran as Mossad's work. In 2024, satellite imagery showed Israeli strikes on former nuclear sites and missile facilities.

During the 2025 war, Mossad agents allegedly assembled drones inside Iran for strikes. The March 2026 assassination of Khamenei was attributed to Mossad-U.S. collaboration.

In July 2026, The New York Times and Haaretz reported that Mossad had spent three years, beginning around 2022, cultivating Ahmadinejad as an intelligence asset, with a plan to install him as leader of a post–Islamic Republic government in case the regime collapses. According to the reports, Mossad director David Barnea met Ahmadinejad personally in Budapest in 2024 under cover of a climate-change conference at the Ludovika University of Public Service, with a second meeting in June 2025, and Israel financed his housing and travel. Haaretz described the effort as one element of a wider plan, codenamed "Puss in Boots", that also involved arming Kurdish forces in northern Iraq, mobilising minorities and opening a militia corridor toward Tehran. The plan reportedly drew strong internal opposition from Military Intelligence chief Shlomi Binder, Research Division head Ofir Mizrahi Rosen and the national security adviser Tzachi Hanegbi, who is said to have called parts of it "science fiction".

On 28 February 2026, the day Ayatollah Ali Khamenei was killed, an Israeli airstrike hit Ahmadinejad's compound in Tehran's Narmak district, reportedly targeting his bodyguards rather than Ahmadinejad himself in order to free him from house arrest; he was wounded but survived and was extracted by Mossad operatives to a safe house, which he later left after growing disillusioned with the operation. The Kurdish uprising did not happen and the Iranian state retained control. Ahmadinejad was seen on 6 July 2026 at Khamenei's funeral, and four senior Iranian officials told The New York Times that he had since been placed under IRGC house arrest after his contacts with Israel were uncovered. Ahmadinejad's office rejected the reports as fabrication.

== Impact ==
These activities have reportedly delayed Iran's nuclear program but prompted Iranian retaliation, including espionage in Israel and attacks abroad. The operations have influenced diplomacy, contributing to the U.S. withdrawal from the Joint Comprehensive Plan of Action in 2018.

== See also ==
- CIA activities in Iran
- Assassination of Iranian nuclear scientists
- Iran–Israel proxy conflict
- Stuxnet
- Mossad
- CIA
