= Yonah Jeremy Bob =

Journalist

- יונה ג'רמי בוב
- Education: Columbia University
- Occupation: Journalist
- Years active: 2012–present
- Employer: The Jerusalem Post
- Known for: Geopolitical journalism

Yonah Jeremy Bob (Hebrew: יונה ג'רמי בוב) is an Israeli journalist who has worked at The Jerusalem Post since 2012 and currently serves as senior military correspondent, intelligence analyst and Literary Editor. He lectures in Israel and the United States on security, spy wars, diplomacy and politics. His book Target Tehran, released in 2023, dealt with Israel's response to the Iranian nuclear program. The book was named one of the Top Five Books in Politics for 2023 by the Wall Street journal, and won the Jewish Book Council Natan Award for 2023. A review in The Wall Street Journal by John Bolton said the book was "replete with anti-Iran cyber-warfare and sabotage successes."

Bob was raised in Baltimore and graduated cum laude from Columbia University and Boston University Law School. He previously worked for the Israeli Foreign Ministry and Israeli Military International Law Division and the Israeli Justice Ministry.

== Journalism and public speaking career ==
Bob was the first to interview former Mossad director Yossi Cohen in English in October 2021. He moderated a panel at Reichman University in which former Israeli Defense Minister Moshe Yaalon and other top defense officials participated. He moderated a panel at Reichman University in which two former Mossad chiefs, Shabtai Shavit and Efrayim Halevy, as well as former IDF intelligence chief Aharon Zeevi Farkash participated.

In 2018, he was the first to report that the Israeli Attorney-General would indict Prime Minister Benjamin Netanyahu for bribery, several months before the first formal announcement. He was subsequently interviewed in-depth about the story.

From July 2020 to January 2023, Bob broke a series of exclusives and first publications about sensational attacks on Iran's nuclear program which most attributed to the Mossad. During the war in Israel that began in October, 2023, Yonah was embedded with Israeli forces in Gaza three times: at Shifa Hospital in northern Gaza, at Yahya Sinwar's house in Khan Yunis and at Rafah, the Philadelphi Corridor and the Kerem Shalom and Rafah Crossings. During this time period he also authored several op-eds in the Wall Street Journal.

Target Tehran, his book co-authored with Ilan Evyatar, was released a month before the outbreak of the 2023 war between Israel and Gaza, and reviews have noted the link between Hamas and Iran. Target Tehran was translated to Hebrew and published by Yediot Books in April 2024. The paperback edition of Target Tehran is due to be published in September 2024, with a new Afterword addressing the post October 7, 2023 world.

Bob was interviewed about the war and his book to media outlets such as NBC Morning Joe, KTEP, BizTalk Radio, at a Hudson Institute seminar, the Reichman University World Counter-Terror Summit, was scholar in residence at Jewish Center in Manhattan, and was interviewed for the 2023 Detroit Jewish Book Fair. He has been a guest lecturer at the World Affairs Council of Greater Houston and at the Foundation for Defense of Democracies, both in October 2023. He and Evyatar presented the book to Israeli President Isaac Herzog upon its release.. He has interviewed many times about the 2023-2024 Middle East War, including on BBC News and FOX News, and has done well over 100 TV and radio interviews over his journalistic career.

== Books ==
- In the War Room: The Inside Story of Israel's Fight Against Hamas and the Iranian Axis by Yonah Jeremy Bob and Elliot Kaufman, 2026
- Target Tehran: How Israel Is Using Sabotage, Cyberwarfare, Assassination – and Secret Diplomacy – to Stop a Nuclear Iran and Create a New Middle East by Yonah Jeremy Bob and Ilan Evyatar, 2023
- A Raid on the Red Sea: The Israeli Capture of the Karine A by Amos Gilboa, edited and translated by Yonah Jeremy Bob, 2021
- Justice in the West Bank?: The Israeli-Palestinian Conflict Goes to Court by Yonah Jeremy Bob, 2019
