= Israeli infiltration of an Iranian nuclear archive =

Exposure of Iran nuclear weapons program

Shorabad warehouse, Tehran
- Part of Mossad activities in Iran
- The Shorabad warehouse (circled) on the outskirts of southern Tehran
- Date: 31 January 2018
- Time: 00:01–06:30 IRST (UTC+03:30)
- Location: Kahrizak District, Tehran; 35.49450°N 51.35654°E
- Motive: Espionage
- Target: Warehouse
- Perpetrator: Mossad
- Outcome: Theft of 100,000+ documents regarding Iran's secret nuclear weapons program (AMAD Project)

On 31 January 2018, fewer than two dozen Mossad agents infiltrated a secret warehouse in the Kahrizak District of southern Tehran (the capital city of Iran), and pilfered 100,000 documents, including paper records and computer files, documenting the nuclear weapons work of Iran's AMAD Project between 1999 and 2003. The trove was part of Iran's clandestine nuclear archive, and documented years of work on atomic weapons, warhead designs and production plans.

== Operation ==
=== Background ===
The 2015 Joint Comprehensive Plan of Action (JCPOA) deal signed by the Obama administration gave the International Atomic Energy Agency (IAEA) rights to visit declared facilities associated with Iran's nuclear program. In response, beginning in February 2016 the Iranians moved thousands of documents, records, and computer files about building nuclear weapons to 32 safes within a storage warehouse in the Shorabad (also spelt Shurabad) industrial district of Tehran, previously unaffiliated with the Iranian Ministry of Defense. The warehouse, which was approximately 23 kilometers from Tehran city center, was located in a row of industrial warehouses and had no visible security presence.

A decision was taken thereafter by Mossad director Yossi Cohen and Prime Minister Benjamin Netanyahu to gather evidence that would convince the new Trump administration to withdraw from the JCPOA deal, and in early 2017 Mossad began planning an operation to capture the incriminating documents.

=== Preparations ===
Using a mixture of human intelligence from within the Government of Iran and signals intelligence from intercepted Iranian communications, Mossad determined that the Minister of Energy Reza Ardakanian and the head of the nuclear program Mohsen Fakhrizadeh had chosen a rundown warehouse in Shorabad to hide the documents. Mossad then sent a female Farsi speaking undercover Israeli agent to Tehran for a reconnaissance mission, where she would leisurely wander around the Shorabad district accompanied by a male guardian while wearing appropriate Islamic clothing and taking note of the security arrangements at the target warehouse. The agent's surveillance revealed that, in an effort not to attract attention, the warehouse did not have a 24 hour guard.

Realizing that the team would have a maximum of seven hours in which to work before the morning security shift would arrive, an exact replica of the site was mocked up for agents to simulate covertly infiltrating it, which was as detailed as having the same type of safes as the material was contained in arranged in the same layout, to practice breaking into the safes themselves and to optimize the movement of the agents within such a confined space. The main reason Mossad decided to physically steal the documents, rather than simply photograph them and have the infiltration remain undetected, was to preempt any subsequent claims by the Iranian authorities that the evidence was forged and also to offer it up for verification by third parties.

=== Warehouse raid ===
Fewer than 24 Mossad agents arrived to a warehouse of the AMAD Project in Tehran overnight on 31 January, equipped with torches that could burn through dozens of safes that held documents and plans of Iran's clandestine nuclear program. At one minute past midnight, the agents used a jamming device to override the alarm system and then breached the iron doors of the warehouse itself. Due to time limitations, the agents only cut open six of the 32 safes, which were those that held the most incriminating material. Although the team's primary objective was to secure the blueprints of the nuclear weapon Iran planned to build, they also unexpectedly found dozens of CD-ROM's containing thousands of electronic documents and videos relating to Iran's nuclear program. Within six and a half hours, the agents had seized approximately 50,000 paper documents and another 55,000 pages of information and plans stored on 183 CD-ROM's, before security officials arrived to the warehouse at 7am. Images of some of the documents were transmitted back to a Mossad command center in Tel Aviv in real-time during the operation for verification purposes.

When security officials arrived, they discovered the break-in. Iranian authorities began a nationwide manhunt involving tens of thousands of personnel to locate the agents, ultimately unsuccessful. It is unknown how the trove was exfiltrated out of Iran. In a later interview, ex-Mossad head Yossi Cohen implied that the documents and data CDs were smuggled out of Iran (allegedly to Azerbaijan) via a lorry, and the agency had several decoy trucks driving in different directions around the outskirts of Greater Tehran in the aftermath of the operation to divert the attention of Iranian intelligence agencies. To negate the risk that the lorry carrying the near half a tonne of documents might be intercepted before crossing the border out of Iran, much of the captured intelligence was transferred digitally to Tel Aviv before the lorry reached the frontier, Cohen added.

=== Iranian reaction ===
In 2024, former Iranian President Mahmoud Ahmadinejad revealed that Iran's intelligence service had established a unit designed to counter Mossad operations, but its leader was exposed as a Mossad double agent in 2021. Ahmadinejad further claimed that about 20 Iranian operatives were working alongside him as double agents, supplying critical intelligence to Israel and participating in the theft of Iranian nuclear documents.

== Contents ==
In total, the archive included 100,000 documents. The majority of the documents were created between 1999 and 2003, after which the AMAD Project was halted and Iran's nuclear weapons research program was cancelled. The documents demonstrated that Iran's program to develop nuclear weapons was larger, more sophisticated, and better organized than was suspected in 2003, when the AMAD Project was halted, according to nuclear experts and journalists. According to weapons expert David Albright, the documents indicated that Iran conducted more high-explosive tests than previously known. The trove indicated that nuclear scientists, such as Massoud Ali-Mohammadi discussed how to split Iran's nuclear program into overt and covert partitions. The documents also contained schematics of Iran's Fordow nuclear facility (then known as Al Ghadir), yielding information on the size and layout of the underground complex.

Journalists from the New York Times and other US outlets and inspectors from the IAEA confirmed that the documents demonstrated Iran had previously worked to develop nuclear weapons, despite the country's insistence that its nuclear program was only for civilian purposes. British and American officials confirmed the authenticity of the trove. The documents also documented then-Iranian President Hassan Rouhani's membership of a Council for Advanced Technologies that approved the program and indicated that the IRGC and Quds Force played supporting roles.

The US had previously known of Iran's nuclear weapons research before 2004, and the documents contained no revelations about recent nuclear activity. According to journalist Yonah Jeremy Bob and nuclear expert Jeffrey Lewis, much of the key contents were already reported in past IAEA reports. However, the trove provided more clarity about Iran's specific goals for its arsenal.

== Aftermath ==
Israeli Prime Minister Benjamin Netanyahu publicly announced the operation in a televised presentation in English in Tel Aviv on 30 April, after privately briefing US President Donald Trump. According to Netanyahu, the documents proved Iran had lied to the international community about its plans. According to U.S. Secretary of State Mike Pompeo, the U.S. had been aware of the documents before Netanyahu's presentation, and Pompeo had discussed them with Netanyahu in Tel Aviv.

Mossad subsequently provided the entirety of the trove to visiting intelligence officials from Germany, France, and the United Kingdom. Netanyahu also spoke with Australian Prime Minister Malcolm Turnbull, Indian Prime Minister Narendra Modi, British Prime Minister Theresa May, Russian President Vladimir Putin, French President Emmanuel Macron, and German Chancellor Angela Merkel about the contents of the nuclear archive.

Days after Netanyahu's presentation of the documents, Trump withdrew the US from the JCPOA, which was the ultimate objective of the operation.

== See also ==
- Mossad activities in Iran
