= Fadi Mohammad al-Batsh =

Palestinian engineer and academic (1983–2018)

Dr. Fadi M. AlBatsh
- Born: 1983; Gaza Strip
- Died: 21 April 2018 (aged 34–35); Kuala Lumpur, Malaysia
- Occupations: Engineer, Researcher and Lecturer

Fadi Mohammad al-Batsh (Arabic: فادي محمد البطش) was a Palestinian engineer and academic. He was killed on 21 April 2018 in Kuala Lumpur, Malaysia, while heading to a mosque for dawn prayers. After al-Batsh's death, Hamas's military wing claimed him as a member and described him as a commander.

== Biography ==
While living in Gaza, he was employed by the Energy Authority and was a resident of the city of Jabalia. He received a PhD in electrical engineering from the University of Malaya in 2015 and during the course of his study, published 18 scholarly pieces of research featured in a number of international journals. Al-Batash had been invited to complete his PhD via a scholarship program under the Khazanah Nasional, and had received an award from the then Prime Minister Najib Razak in recognition of his research. Fadi was also an imam and involved with Islamic organizations such as MyCARE.

Al-Batsh was a lecturer in electrical engineering at the Universiti Kuala Lumpur British-Malaysian-Institute (UniKL BMI). He had been living in Malaysia since 2011.

== Assassination ==
Assassination of Fadi Mohammad al-Batsh
- Setapak (Peninsular Malaysia)
- Location: 3.209477°N 101.709755°E; Setapak District, Kuala Lumpur, Malaysia
- Date: 21 April 2018
- Target: Fadi Mohammad al-Batsh
- Perpetrator: Mossad (suspected)
- Assailants: 2 reported suspects
- Motive: Israeli–Palestinian conflict, Targeted killing by Israel

In the early morning hours of 21 April 2018, while walking to dawn prayers at the nearby Surau Medan Idaman mosque in the Setapak District of north eastern Kuala Lumpur, al-Batsh was shot dead by two gunmen outside his apartment at the Idaman Puteri condominium. The assassins, who were later described as being of European appearance, fired 14 bullets at al-Batsh before escaping on a high powered BMW GS series motorbike. The pair, who had been lying in wait for around 20 minutes, dumped the motorbike about a kilometer away at a lake beside the Setapak Central Mall then switched to a van waiting a short distance away, before fleeing across the Malaysia–Thailand border via an illegal crossing point. Investigations by the Royal Malaysia Police determined the suspects had originally entered Malaysia two months previously on false passports issued by Serbia and Montenegro. Police were also able to capture an image of one of the suspects from where the motorbike was abandoned beside Danau Kota lake, which was released to the public.

== Reactions ==
After al-Batsh's death, Hamas's military wing claimed him as a member and described him as a commander.

Al-Batsh's family accused Mossad of being responsible for the killing. Israel denied any involvement in the assassination. Hamas chief Ismail Haniyeh called his killing a "terrible crime" and attributed it to Mossad.

Israeli Defense Minister Avigdor Lieberman described al-Batsh as "no saint and he didn’t deal with improving infrastructure in Gaza. He was engaged in the production of rockets, in improving rockets’ accuracy... We constantly see a settling of accounts between various factions in the terrorist organizations and I suppose that is what happened in this case."

Shortly after his death, the New York Times published an article claiming Mossad director Yossi Cohen ordered al-Batsh’s assassination as part of a wide ranging operation against Hamas members being sent abroad for technical training and the sourcing of weapons.

Malaysian Home Minister Ahmad Zahid Hamidi said Fadi was "believed to have become a liability for a country hostile to Palestine".

Humanitarian Care Malaysia (MyCARE) chairman Associate Professor Dr Hafidzi Mohd Noor said Fadi was an expert in renewable energy sources, especially in regards to generator engineering. "We don’t deny the possibility that his achievements and his capabilities had perhaps made him a target for Israeli Zionists. In fact, before this he had mentioned his worry that he would be attacked by Apache helicopter gunships back in Palestine, and mentioned that 18 members of his extended family had been killed in Gaza in 2009 alone."

== Personal life ==
Fadi was married and had three children.

== See also ==
- Nidal Fat'hi Rabah Farahat
- Operation Wooden Leg
- Khalil al-Wazir
- Salah Khalaf
