= Roman Gofman =

Israeli military officer and advisor

- רומן גופמן
- Gofman in June 2026

Director of Mossad
- Incumbent
- Assumed office 2 June 2026
- Prime Minister: Benjamin Netanyahu
- Preceded by: David Barnea

Military Secretary to the Prime Minister
- In office 16 May 2024 – 2 June 2026
- Prime Minister: Benjamin Netanyahu

Personal details
- Born: 30 November 1976 (age 49) Mazyr, Byelorussian SSR, Soviet Union
- Children: 3
- Education: Ashkelon Academic College (BA); University of Haifa (MA)

Military service
- Allegiance: Israel
- Branch/service: Israel Defense Forces
- Years of service: 1995–present
- Rank: Aluf
- Battles/wars: South Lebanon conflict (1985–2000); Second Intifada; Operation Defensive Shield; 2006 Lebanon War; Operation Cast Lead; Operation Pillar of Defense; Operation Brother’s Keeper; Operation Protective Edge; 2023 Israel–Hamas war

Roman Gofman (Hebrew:רומן גופמן; born 30 November 1976) is a former Israel Defense Forces officer with the rank of Aluf who currently serves as the director of Mossad since 2026. He previously served as Military Secretary of Israel in the government of Benjamin Netanyahu from 2024 to 2026.

== Early life ==
Gofman was born in the Byelorussian SSR of the Soviet Union, and immigrated to Israel with his family in 1990 at age 14, settling in Ashdod. During his youth, he studied at the ORT Ashdod Nautical Officers School. Experiencing alienation and violence from other students, he began training in boxing.

Gofman graduated with a Bachelor's degree in political science from Ashkelon Academic College. He later earned a Master's degree in political science and national security from the University of Haifa. During his academic studies he also attended the Bnei David Mechina in Eli.

== Military career ==
He enlisted in the IDF in 1995 to the Armored Corps, assigned to the 53rd Battalion of the 188th Armored Brigade. He completed basic training, the tank commanders' course and the officers' course. Afterward, he served as a tank platoon commander in 71st Battalion and took part in combat in South Lebanon. He later served as deputy company commander, then as company commander of the 71st Battalion, leading operations in the Gaza Strip and West Bank during the Second Intifada and Operation Defensive Shield. He subsequently served as deputy commander of the 71st Battalion, then as deputy commander of the training battalion in the 460th Brigade, and later as the operations officer of the Ga'ash Formation.

In 2010 he was promoted to Lieutenant Colonel and appointed Head of the Armored Corps Branch at the National Center for Ground Training (MALI). In 2011 he was appointed commander of the 75th Battalion in the 7th Armored Brigade. He held the position until 2013. From 2013 to 2015 he served as the Operations Officer of the Ga'ash Formation.

On 30 August 2015, he was promoted to Colonel and appointed commander of the Etzion Brigade.

On 2 August 2017, he was appointed commander of the 7th Armored Brigade.

At the 2018 IDF senior command conference, he argued for more frequent employment of ground forces. After completing his term in 2019 he attended the National Security College.

=== 2023–2024 war (Operation Iron Swords) ===
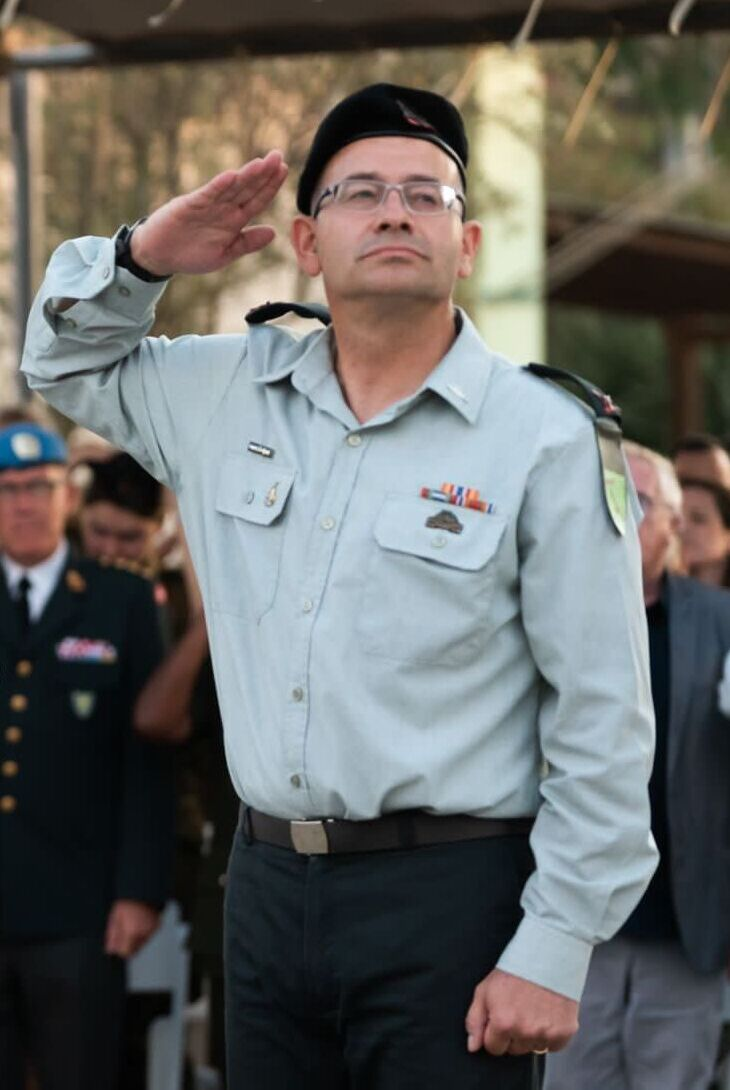
Gofman in 2022

On 7 October 2023, during the 2023 Hamas attack on Israel, he drove from his house in Ashdod toward Sderot after reports of infiltrations, joined police volunteers and engaged Hamas militants at Sha'ar HaNegev junction. He killed two militants and was seriously wounded in the knee. After his recovery he served for several months as Chief of Staff to the Coordinator of Government Activities in the Territories. In March 2024 he was approved for appointment as head of the Shiloh Division in the Directorate of Planning, but on 8 April 2024 it was announced that he would instead become the Military Secretary to the Prime Minister.

In April 2024 he authored a document arguing Israel should institute military administration in the Gaza Strip. The IDF stated the document reflected his personal view only.

=== Military Secretary to the Prime Minister ===
On 16 May 2024 he was promoted to Aluf and assumed office as Military Secretary to Prime Minister Benjamin Netanyahu. In this role he was involved in Israel–Russia contacts following the potential collapse of the Assad regime.

He played a key part in a covert Israeli initiative to manage the humanitarian aid to the Gaza Strip during the 2023-2024 war, in which the U.S. company SRS (Safe Reach Solutions) and the GHF foundation were selected through a classified process.

== Director of the Mossad ==
=== Nomination ===
On 4 December 2025, Prime Minister Netanyahu announced his intention to appoint Gofman as the next Director of the Mossad. His appointment was approved by the Senior Appointments Advisory Committee on 12 April 2026, with Gofman succeeding the outgoing Mossad director David Barnea on June 2.

== Personal life ==
Gofman lives in Ashdod, married, and has three daughters.
