= Shabtai Shavit =

Israeli intelligence officer (1939–2023)

- שבתי שביט
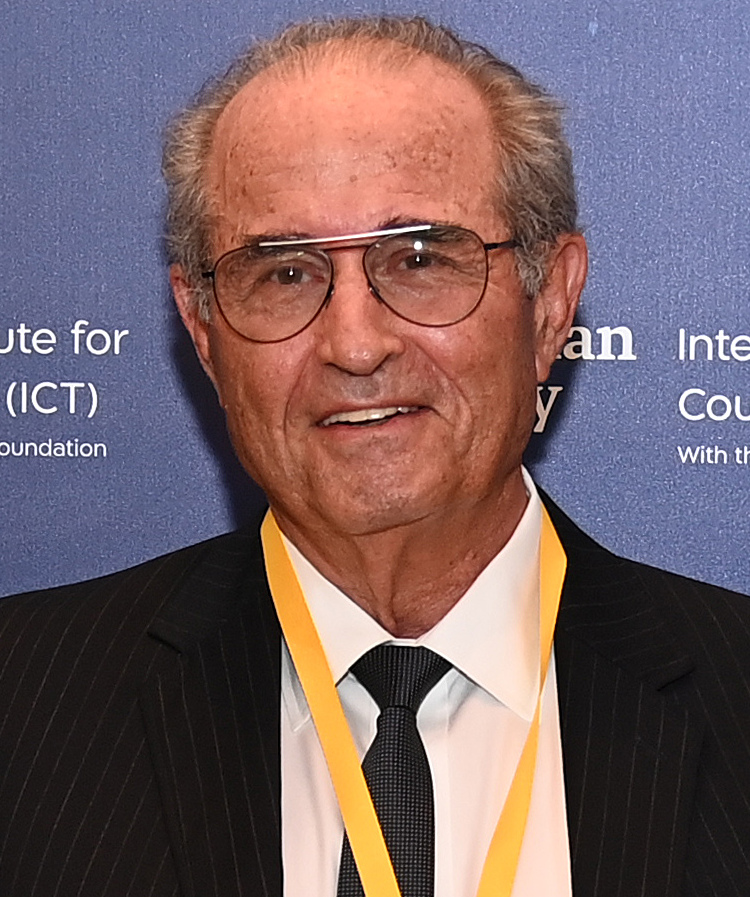
- Born: 17 July 1939; Nesher, Mandatory Palestine
- Died: 5 September 2023 (aged 84); Sicily, Italy
- Education: Harvard University
- Occupation: Director of Mossad
- Espionage activity
- Allegiance: State of Israel
- Service branch: Mossad
- Service years: 1964–1996

Shabtai Shavit (Hebrew: שבתי שביט; 17 July 1939 – 5 September 2023) was an Israeli intelligence officer who served as the Director-General of the Mossad from 1989 to 1996.

== Biography ==
Shavit first joined the Israeli Navy, where he later went on to serve in the Sayeret Matkal. From 1978 to 1979, he was military governor of the Southern Command. In 1964, he joined the Mossad, where he worked his way up to director general.

After retiring from the Mossad, he spent five years as CEO of Maccabi Health Services Group. From 2001, he was chairman of the Institute for Counter-Terrorism at the Interdisciplinary Center in Herzliya, Israel. He was president and CEO of EMG Israel and chairman of Athena. Shavit continued to work in government, including as advisor to the Israeli National Security Council, advisor to the Knesset Committee on Foreign Affairs and National Security Sub-Committee on Intelligence, and as a member of the N.Y.F.D. Task Force for Future Preparedness Against Terrorism.

In an article by reporter Judah Ari Gross in The Times of Israel dated 17 May 2017, Shavit criticized President Donald Trump, stating his actions "put international information sharing at risk, in light of reports that the US President divulged classified intelligence to Russia." The former spy chief went on to accuse Trump of "entering situations without first being properly briefed, and then unwittingly violating the unwritten codes of conduct of intelligence."

Shavit died on 5 September 2023, at the age of 84, while on a vacation to Italy.

== Autobiography ==
- Shavit, Shabtai (2018). ראש המוסד [Head of Mossad] (in Hebrew). Yedioth. ISBN 978-965-564-549-1.
