= AMAD Project =

Iranian nuclear explosive device program

AMAD Project (or AMAD Plan, Persian: پروژه آماد) is an alleged Iranian scientific project with the aim of developing nuclear weapons. It began in 1989, ended in 2003 according to the International Atomic Energy Agency (IAEA), but elements are alleged by Israel to have continued nonetheless. Iran has denied the existence of any program aimed at the development of a nuclear explosive device, and in particular denied the existence of the AMAD Plan when reporting additional details to the IAEA in 2015.

== IAEA investigation ==
Starting in 2005, the IAEA gathered information from its member states indicating that in the late 1980s Iran had launched a plan aimed at the development of a nuclear explosive device. This information indicated that these activities started within Departments of the Physics Research Centre (PHRC), and by the early 2000s came to be focused on projects of the AMAD Plan under the leadership of Mohsen Fakhrizadeh. According to the IAEA, the programme gathered several projects aiming at designing and integrating nuclear payloads (projects 110 and 111), manufacturing explosive components (project 3), and enriching uranium (project 4).

The same information indicated that "activities under the AMAD Plan were brought to a halt in late 2003 and that the work was fully recorded, equipment and work places were either cleaned or disposed of so that there would be little to identify the sensitive nature of the work that had been undertaken."

In August 2015, under the roadmap, Iran provided the IAEA with additional details and denied the existence of any program aimed at the development of a nuclear explosive device, and in particular denied the existence of the AMAD Plan.

In a 2015 report named Final Assessment on Past and Present Outstanding Issues regarding Iran’s Nuclear Programme, the IAEA assessed that:

"a range of activities relevant to the development of a nuclear explosive device were conducted in Iran prior to the end of 2003 as a coordinated effort, and some activities took place after 2003 [but] these activities did not advance beyond feasibility and scientific studies, and the acquisition of certain relevant technical competences and capabilities. The Agency has no credible indications of activities in Iran relevant to the development of a nuclear explosive device after 2009".

== 2018 Israeli operation ==
On 31 January 2018, Israeli Mossad agents infiltrated a secret warehouse in southern Tehran, and pilfered 100,000 documents, including paper records and computer files, documenting the nuclear weapons work of the AMAD Project between 1999 and 2003.

On 30 April, Israeli prime minister Benjamin Netanyahu presented the operation's trove to the public. According to Netanyahu, the documents proved Iran had lied to the international community about its plans, with the goal of the AMAD Project to design, produce and test five warheads, each with ten kiloton yield for integration on a missile. Iranian foreign minister Javad Zarif tweeted to say the evidence was a "rehash of old allegations" which had already been dealt with by the IAEA.

According to David Albright of the Institute for Science and International Security, the archive indicated that Iran's weapon program was more advanced than believed previously in the West and that should Iran pull out of the Joint Comprehensive Plan of Action it would be able to produce weapons swiftly, possibly within a few months. According to journalist Yonah Jeremy Bob and nuclear expert Jeffrey Lewis, much of the key contents were already reported in past IAEA reports. However, the trove provided more clarity about Iran's specific goals for its arsenal.

== See also ==
- Iran and weapons of mass destruction
- Iran–Israel relations
- Iran–Israel proxy conflict
