= Yuri Ivanov (military) =

Russian spy (1957–2010)

Major-General Yuri Yevgenyevich Ivanov (Russian: Юрий Евгеньевич Иванов; 28 October 1957, – August 2010) was a Russian military officer and deputy head of Russia's foreign military intelligence unit GRU (Glavnoye Razvedyvatel'noye Upravleniye, part of the General Staff of the Armed Forces of the Russian Federation). He was found dead in August 2010, washed up on a Turkish beach.

== Career ==
Ivanov was born in the Volsk, Saratov Oblast. He entered the Soviet Army in 1975 as a private. In 1980 he graduated from the M.V. Frunze Kyiv higher military academy. In 2000 he served in the North Caucasus where he carried out spying missions. In 2006 he was promoted to the leadership of GRU.

== Death ==
His decomposed body was found on a Turkish beach in early August 2010. He had been staying in the Syrian town of Latakia, a resort near a strategically important Russian naval facility located in the port of Tartus. The facility is currently being used by Russian forces stationed in Syria.

His death was not made public until 28 August 2010 when it was reported in the Russian military newspaper the Krasnaya Zvezda. Officially, he died in a swimming accident but there is no explanation of how he moved from Syria to Turkey. Ivanov was buried in Moscow.
