= Wolfgang Lotz =

Israeli spy (1921–1993)

- ולפגנג לוץ
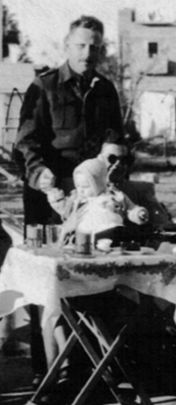
- Wolfgang Lotz with his son, Oded, in 1950
- Born: 6 January 1921; Mannheim, Weimar Republic
- Died: 13 May 1993 (aged 72); Munich, Germany
- Other name: Ze'ev Gur-Arie
- Occupation: Spy
- Spouses: Rivka Lotz; Waltraud Neumann
- Children: 1 (Oded Gur-Arie)
- Military career
- Allegiance: Israel
- Branch: Israel Defense Forces
- Rank: Major
- Conflicts: World War II (with British Army); 1948 Arab–Israeli War; Sinai War
- Other work: Sports department leader at Kaufhof department store, Munich

Wolfgang Lotz (Hebrew: ולפגנג לוץ; 6 January 1921 – 13 May 1993), who later adopted the Hebrew name Ze'ev Gur-Arie, was an Israeli spy in Egypt during the 1960s providing intelligence and conducting operations against Egyptian military scientists. He was arrested by Egypt in 1965, and subsequently repatriated to Israel in a prisoner exchange.

== Early life ==
Wolfgang Lotz was born in Mannheim, Germany on January 6, 1921 to a Jewish mother, Helene, and a non-Jewish German father, Hans. Hans Lotz was a theater director who worked alongside his wife, an actress.

His parents were non-religious to the extent that Lotz's mother did not even care to have her son circumcised at birth, contrary to Jewish practice. This later proved to be advantageous in his career as a spy; the fact that Lotz had not been circumcised enabled him to convince others he was not Jewish. His parents divorced in 1931. In 1933, Adolf Hitler came to power. In 1937 Lotz and his mother emigrated to Palestine Mandate, where they settled in Tel Aviv. He adopted the Hebrew name Ze'ev Gur-Arie, and began to study at the agricultural school at Ben Shemen. In 1937 he joined the Haganah and engaged in a number of security duties.

After the outbreak of World War II in 1939, Lotz was recruited into the British Army because of his knowledge of the German language. He was stationed in Egypt, where he joined an intelligence unit and mostly interrogated German POWs. After the war, he returned to Israel and was involved in smuggling weapons for the Haganah.

In 1948 Lotz married an Israeli Jew, Rivka, and they had a son, Oded Gur-Arie. At the outbreak of the Independence War in 1948 Lotz joined the newly formed Israel Defense Forces and served with the rank of Captain. He took part in the battle around Latrun. At the end of the war in 1949, Lotz held the rank of major.

== Spying career ==
After the war, Lotz joined Aman. His superiors planned to send him to Egypt to gather intelligence on Gamal Abdel Nasser's armaments plans and plot targets for the next Israeli attack. Aman also hoped that because of Lotz's command of the German language and his Aryan appearance, he could infiltrate the circle of German scientists who worked on the Egyptian armaments programs.

Lotz was sent to Germany in 1959 in order to establish his cover story as a German businessman and ex-Wehrmacht officer who had served in North Africa, and was a former member of the Nazi Party. After purportedly living for 11 years in Australia where he had bred horses, in his "legend" (cover story) Lotz had come back to Egypt in order to establish a riding club. The North Africa element of his cover story was devised because Lotz, who had interrogated hundreds of the German POWs in World War II, was familiar with their way of life and could easily tell war stories about his "comrades." The riding club would allow Lotz to make contact with Egyptian high society. He arrived in Cairo in 1960 and began immediately to form friendships with high ranking Egyptian officials and military personnel. In Cairo, Lotz portrayed himself as a dedicated Nazi and anti-Semite so well that the rumor quickly started to spread that he was a former SS officer.

Lotz traveled to Paris in June 1961 for a meeting with his operators (he was in the meantime transferred to the responsibility of the Mossad), where he received large amounts of money and a transponder for sending secret messages. Lotz visited his wife and son who were housed in Paris during the time of his mission in Egypt. During his train journey from Paris, Lotz met a German woman called Waltraud Neumann and decided to marry her, despite the fact he was married to another woman. Lotz married Neumann in Munich. Lotz did not discuss his intentions with his operators. Mossad was horrified by this and even considered recalling Lotz, but in the end allowed Lotz to continue his mission. His new wife was allowed to join him. While she soon discovered his real occupation, she was told Lotz worked for NATO and she began to help him.

In Cairo, Lotz eventually opened his riding club and continued to befriend the elite of Egyptian society. He managed to persuade them to show him the Egyptian missile launch sites and he gathered intelligence on the Egyptian military and its industries. He also composed a list of German scientists who worked for the Egyptians and in September 1964 he sent letter bombs to some of them, in an attempt to induce them to cease their work. Lotz's letter bombs killed some Egyptian civilians and their effects were deemed limited.

== Arrest ==
On 22 February 1965, Lotz was arrested at his home in Cairo. Lotz at first denied the charges of espionage, but broke down after the Egyptian police found a radio transmitter in his house while Lotz was confronted with evidence of coded radio messages transmitted from his house. In 1965 Syria had caught the Israeli arch-spy Eli Cohen while he used a wireless set, whose transmissions were traced back to his house in Damascus. Inspired by the Syrian example, the Egyptians had purchased new radio direction-finding equipment from the Soviet Union, which promptly picked up Lotz's transmissions.

According to Lotz's 1972 autobiography, The Champagne Spy, Lotz was captured after a wireless set was discovered hidden inside a bathroom scale; he had used this to transmit Egyptian target coordinates prior to the outbreak of the Six-Day War in 1967.

The most recent account, reported that the Egyptians aided by Soviet experts in radio detection tracked Lotz down to his Cairo home and arrested him. Lotz, thinking he was exposed, confessed to being a spy but stuck to his German cover story and claimed he was tempted by the Israelis to spy for them in exchange for them giving him funds to establish his riding club. The Egyptians believed that Lotz was a German spying for Israel for financial reasons; had they known that Lotz was an Israeli citizen spying because he was a Zionist, he would have almost certainly been executed. However, Lotz was still tortured for information.

According to some Israeli accounts, the Egyptians believed Lotz even when evidence arrived from Germany which pointed to his true identity. Lotz and his wife were put on trial and the Mossad managed to get him represented by a German lawyer and ensure a German observer from the embassy who oversaw the fairness of the trial.

Lotz was sentenced to life imprisonment as a spy on 21 August 1965, and his wife was sentenced to three years in jail. Both were released in the prisoner exchange in 1968 following the 1967 Six-Day War.

== Later work and death ==
He resided in Israel until the death of his German wife, Waltraud, in 1973, who died from coronary disease. He never returned to his Israeli wife and their son, Oded Gur-Arie. Lotz was called in 1980 to Munich by Egon Flörchinger, general manager of book publisher Moewig Verlag, for whom he wrote a number of paperbacks. He became the leader of the sports department of the big Kaufhof department store in Munich, part of the fourth-largest retailer in the world Metro AG.

During the 1982 war in Lebanon, his old companion Ariel Sharon called him back to Israel for a special mission. Together with Jonathan Stern — like Lotz born in Germany — Lotz was to guide foreign journalists to Beirut and explain to them the Israeli position. Back in Munich he met journalist Herma Haddorp and fell in love with her. The couple moved into a luxurious apartment in Munich-Bogenhausen where he lived until his death a decade later. He died in 1993 at age 72 from heart disease he had acquired in Egypt during his imprisonment. Lotz was buried in Israel with full military honours.

== Sources ==
- Polmar, Norman; Allen, Thomas (1998). The Spy Book. New York: Random House. ISBN 0-375-70249-0.
