= Mossad =

National intelligence agency of Israel

- Institute for Intelligence and Special Operations; Hebrew: המוסד למודיעין ולתפקידים מיוחדים; Arabic: الموساد للاستخبارات والمهام الخاصة
- Hebrew: באין תחבולות יפול עםותשועה ברוב יועץ "Where there is no guidance a people falls, but in a multitude of counselors there is salvation." (Proverbs 11:14)

Agency overview
- Formed: December 13, 1949; 76 years ago (as the Central Institute for Coordination)
- Headquarters: Tel Aviv, Israel
- Employees: Classified (est. 7,000)
- Annual budget: Classified (est. US$2.73 billion)
- Agency executive: Roman Gofman, director
- Parent agency: Office of the Prime Minister
- Website: www.mossad.gov.il

The Institute for Intelligence and Special Operations, (Note: Hebrew: המוסד למודיעין ולתפקידים מיוחדים, romanized: ha-Mosád le-Modiʿín u-le-Tafkidím Meyuḥadím) popularly known as Mossad, (Note: Also referred to as "the Mossad" (Hebrew: הַמּוֹסָד, romanized: ha-Mosád, IPA: [hamoˈsad]; Arabic: الموساد, romanized: al-Mōsād, IPA: [almoːˈsaːd]; lit. 'the Institute').) is the national intelligence agency of the State of Israel. It is one of the main organizations in the Israeli intelligence community, along with Aman (military intelligence) and Shin Bet (internal security).

Mossad is responsible for intelligence collection, covert operations, extrajudicial killings and counterterrorism. Its director answers directly and only to the prime minister. Its annual budget is around ₪10 billion (US$2.73 billion), and it employs around 7,000 people, making it one of the world's largest espionage agencies. The organization has orchestrated many assassination plots across a variety of locations.

== History ==
Mossad was formed on December 13, 1949, as the Central Institute for Coordination at the recommendation of Prime Minister David Ben-Gurion to Reuven Shiloah. Ben Gurion wanted a central body to coordinate and improve cooperation between the existing security services—the army's intelligence department (Aman), the Internal Security Service (Shin Bet), and the Political Intelligence Service (Mossad). The central body governing the three security services was Va'adat; today it is the Ministry of Intelligence.

In March 1951, it was reorganized and incorporated into the prime minister's office, reporting directly to the prime minister of Israel. Due to Mossad's accountability directly to the prime minister and not to the Knesset, journalist Ronen Bergman has described Mossad as a "deep state".

In the 1990s, Aliza Magen-Halevi became the highest-ranking woman in Mossad's history when she served as the agency's deputy director under Shabtai Shavit and Danny Yatom.

Mossad made an unusual move on Israel's 68th Independence Day by releasing a secret recruitment ad for its Cyber Division. The ad featured seemingly random letters and numbers, which turned out to be a hidden puzzle. Over 25,000 people attempted to solve it, and while most failed, dozens succeeded and were recruited. In a rare 2012 interview with "Lady Globes", Mossad fighters talked about the recruitment of men and women to the Mossad, the screening tests, their work in the Mossad alongside starting a family, the relationship between the time to prepare for the actions and the actions themselves, working in teams, the emotional intelligence required of them, the nature of the activity, avoiding fame and omnipotence, and conversations with enemies.

== Organization ==
=== Divisions ===
The organizational structure of the Mossad is officially classified. Mossad is organized into divisions, each led by a director who is equivalent to a major general in the Israel Defense Forces.

- Tzomet: Mossad's largest division, staffed with case officers called katsas tasked with conducting espionage overseas and running agents. Employees in Tzomet operate under a variety of covers, including diplomatic and unofficial. The division was led from 2006 to 2011 by Yossi Cohen and from 2013 to 2019 by David Barnea, both of whom later served as Mossad directors.
- Caesarea: conducts special operations and houses the Kidon (Hebrew: כידון, "bayonet", "javelin" or a "spear") unit, an elite group of assassins.
- Keshet ("Rainbow"): electronic surveillance, break-ins, and wiretapping
- Human Resources
- A special unit called Metsada allegedly runs "small units of combatants" whose missions include "assassinations and sabotage".

=== Venture capital ===
Mossad opened a venture capital fund in June 2017, to invest in high-tech startups to develop new cyber technologies. The names of technology startups funded by Mossad are not published.

=== Personnel ===
==== Katsa ====
A katsa is a field intelligence officer of the Mossad. The word katsa is a Hebrew acronym for Hebrew: קצין איסוף, romanized: ktsin issuf, "intelligence officer", literally "gathering officer". A katsa is a case officer who runs agents to clandestinely collect intelligence.

==== Kidon ====
The kidon are Mossad's elite assassins. Recruits receive two years of training at Mossad's training facility near Herzliya.

==== Sayanim ====
Sayanim (Hebrew: סייענים, lit. helpers, assistants) are unpaid Jewish civilians who help Mossad out of a sense of devotion to Israel. They are recruited by Mossad's field agents, katsas, to provide logistical support for Mossad operations. A sayan running a rental agency, for instance, could help Mossad agents rent a car without the usual documentation. The usage of sayanim allows the Mossad to operate with a slim budget yet conduct vast operations worldwide. Sayanim can have dual citizenships but are often not Israeli citizens. According to Gordon Thomas, there were 4,000 sayanim in Britain and some 16,000 in the United States in 1998. Israeli students called bodlim are often used as gofers for Mossad.

== Motto ==
Mossad's former motto, be-tachbūlōt ta`aseh lekhā milchāmāh (Hebrew: בתחבולות תעשה לך מלחמה) is a quote from the Bible (Proverbs 24:6): "For by stratagems you wage war" (NJPS).

The motto was later changed to another Proverbs passage: be-'éyn tachbūlōt yippol `ām; ū-teshū`āh be-rov yō'éts (Hebrew: באין תחבולות יפול עם, ותשועה ברוב יועץ, Proverbs 11:14), translated as "Where there is no guidance a people falls, but in a multitude of counselors there is salvation."

== Directors ==
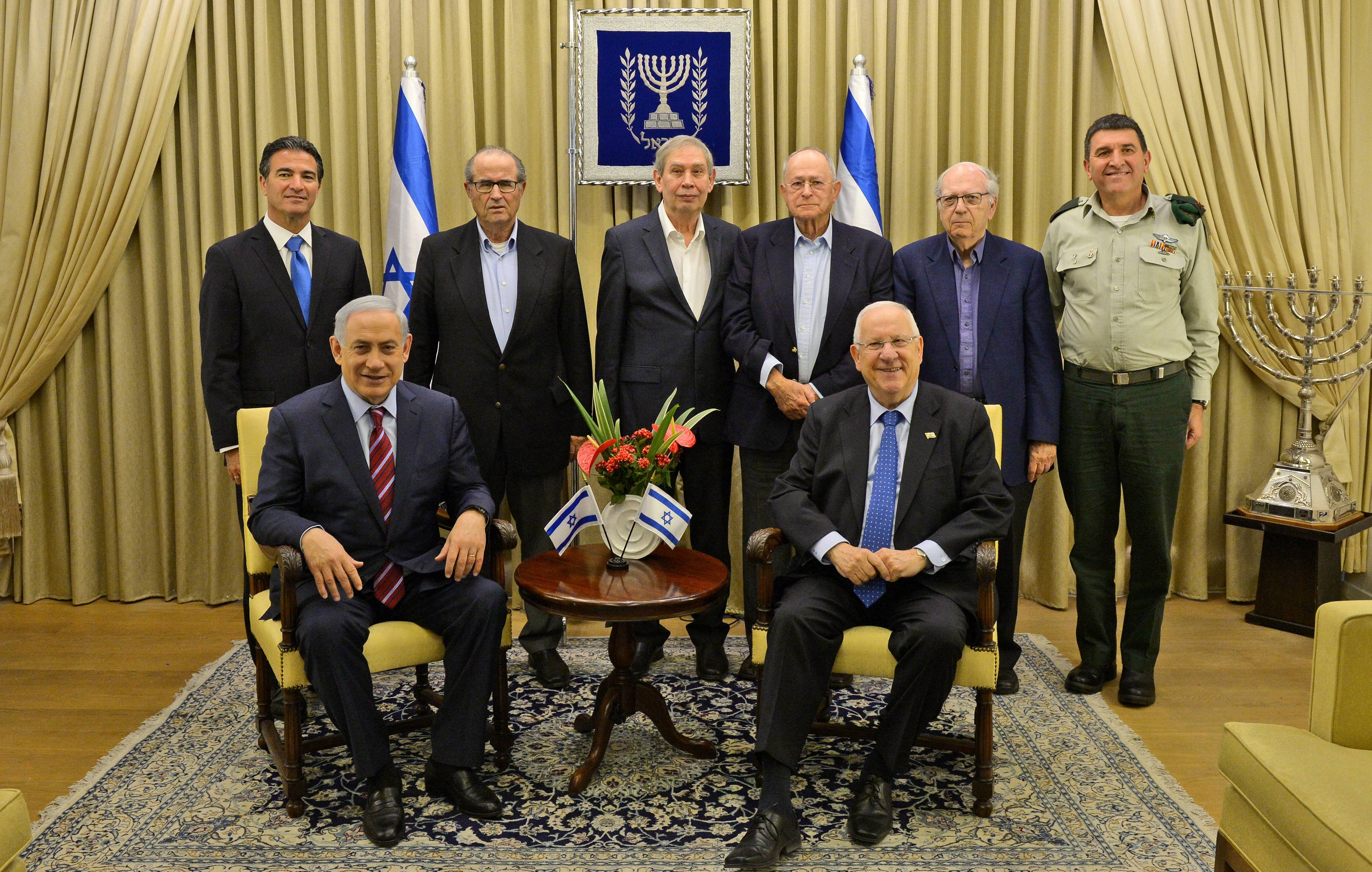
Directors of the Mossad with Benjamin Netanyahu in 2015

About half of the Mossad's leaders rose through its ranks, while the rest are retired IDF soldiers appointed to head the agency. The Prime Minister personally appoints the head of the Mossad for Intelligence and Special Duties without needing government or other supervisory body approval (unlike the Chief of Staff or the Shin Bet's head). The appointment undergoes review by the advisory committee for appointing senior civil service officials. The term is five years, extendable by the Prime Minister for another year without conditions.

Until 1996, the head of Mossad's name was kept confidential. Mossad argued that secrecy allowed the head to move freely worldwide. In response to public criticism, the government began revealing the head's name when Danny Yatom assumed office.

#	Image	Director	Term
1		Reuven Shiloah	1949–1953
2		Isser Harel	1953–1963
3		Meir Amit	1963–1968
4		Zvi Zamir	1968–1973
5		Yitzhak Hofi	1973–1982
6		Nahum Admoni	1982–1989
7		Shabtai Shavit	1989–1996
8		Danny Yatom	1996–1998
9		Efraim Halevy	1998–2002
10		Meir Dagan	2002–2011
11		Tamir Pardo	2011–2016
12		Yossi Cohen	2016–2021
13		David Barnea	2021–2026
14		Roman Gofman	2026–

== Major operations ==
Mossad has been linked to a large number of covert operations since the 1950s, including espionage, sabotage, targeted killings, cyber warfare and the covert emigration of Jewish communities. The agency rarely confirm or deny its activities, and most operations attributed to it are known only through leaks, foreign intelligence assessments, memoirs of former officers, journalism and, rarely, through subsequent official acknowledgement. Many attributions remain unproven.

A number of operations have attracted international attention, either because they were officially acknowledged, because they produced a diplomatic or legal crisis, or because they are widely held to have altered the course of a war or a weapons programme. These include the 1960 capture of the Nazi fugitive Adolf Eichmann in Argentina; the penetration of the Syrian leadership by Eli Cohen; the campaign of killings that followed the 1972 Munich massacre; operations against the nuclear programmes of Iraq, Syria and Iran; the Stuxnet computer worm; the 2018 removal of Iran's secret nuclear archive; the 2024 Lebanon electronic device attacks; and a reported effort to install former Iranian president Mahmoud Ahmadinejad at the head of a post-revolutionary Iranian government.

Several of the best-known operations are failures. The Lillehammer affair of 1973, in which a Moroccan waiter was killed in mistake for a Black September commander, and the 1997 attempt of assassination of the Hamas official Khaled Mashal in Amman, Jordan both caused serious damage to Israel's foreign relations. Various activities by Mossad have been described as acts of state-sponsored terrorism.

=== Pursuit of Nazi fugitives ===
==== Capture of Adolf Eichmann ====
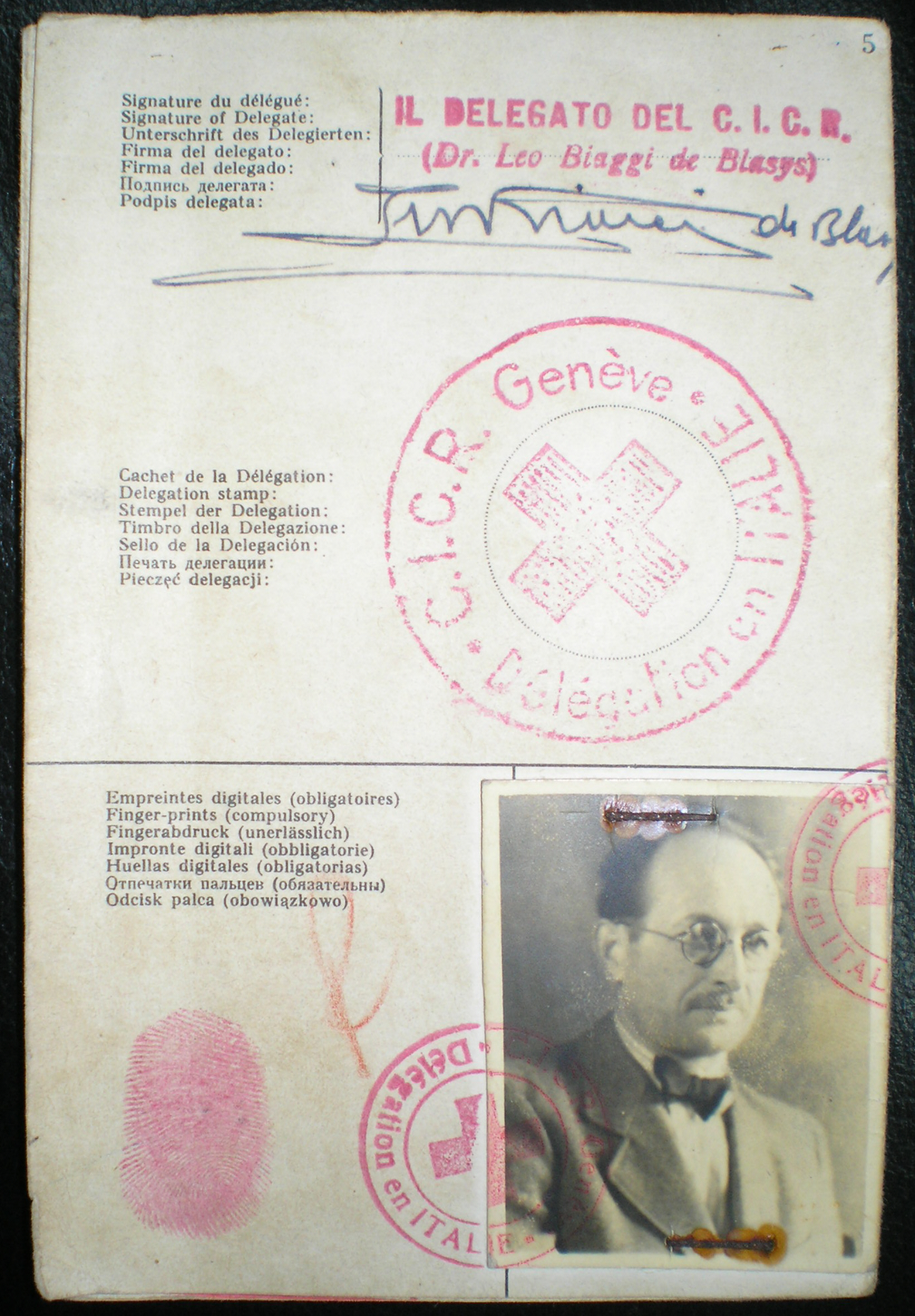
International Committee of the Red Cross identity document with a portrait of A. Eichmann, issued under the name Ricardo Klement, which enabled him to escape to Argentina

In 1960, Mossad discovered that Adolf Eichmann, a Nazi war criminal, was living in Argentina. A group of Mossad agents flew to the country and confirmed that he was living under the name Ricardo Klement. He was captured on 11 May 1960, held in a hideout, and smuggled to Israel, where he was tried and executed.

Argentina protested that its sovereignty had been violated, and the United Nations Security Council noted that "repetition of acts such as [this] would involve a breach of the principles upon which international order is founded", while also acknowledging that "Eichmann should be brought to appropriate justice for the crimes of which he is accused".

==== Other operations against war criminals ====
An operation intended to capture Josef Mengele, was abandoned.

In 1965, Mossad assassinated the Latvian Nazi collaborator Herberts Cukurs in Uruguay. Letter bombs were also used: an attempt on 25 September 1963 to kill the SS-Hauptsturmführer and concentration camp doctor Hans Eisele failed when the device detonated early, killing a postal worker instead, and a 1980 letter bomb sent to Alois Brunner exploded early and he lost only four fingers of his right hand.

=== Human intelligence ===
==== Eli Cohen in Syria ====
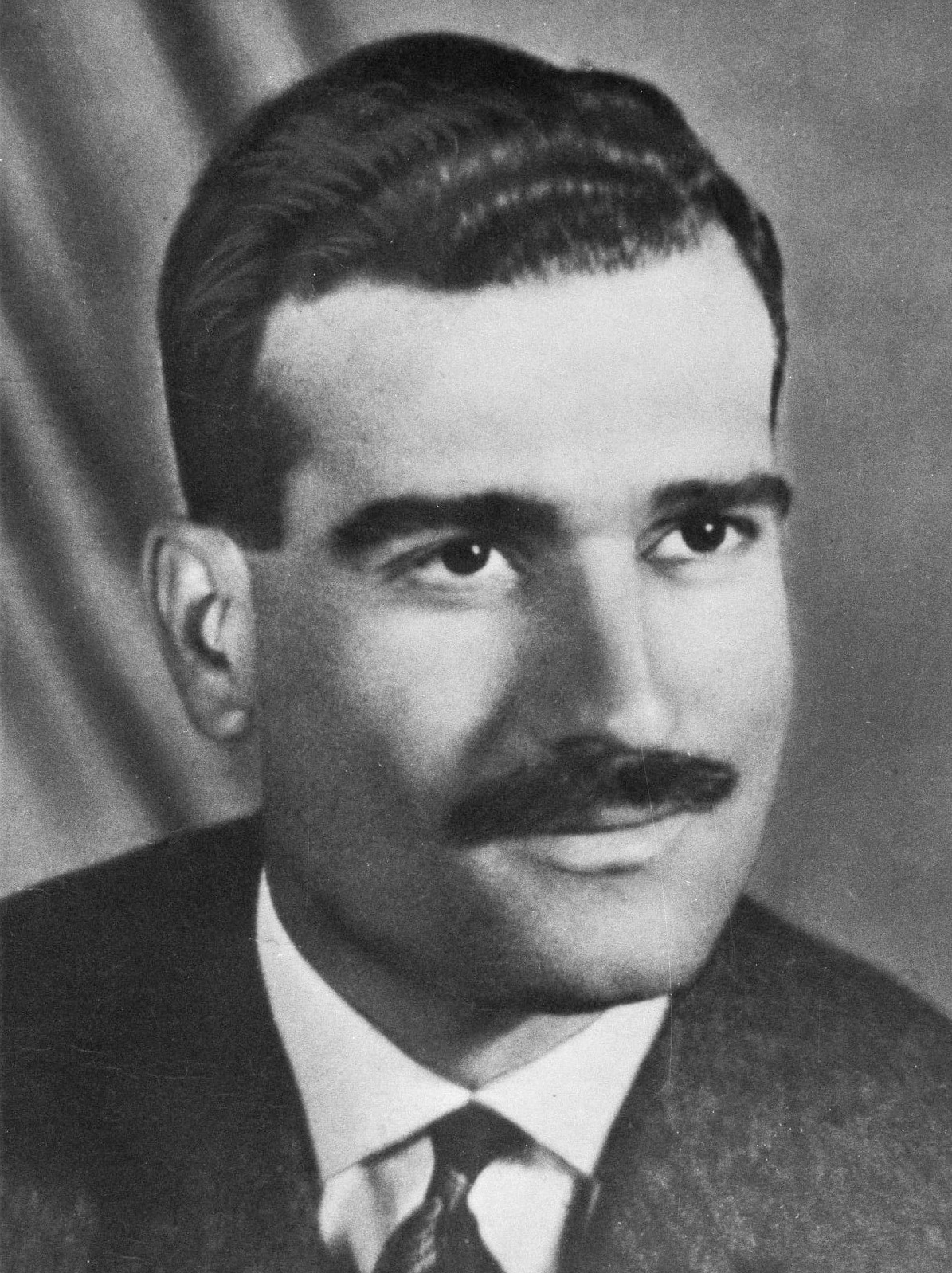
Cohen in 1959

Eli Cohen infiltrated the highest echelons of the Syrian government, became a close friend of the Syrian president and was considered for the post of Minister of Defense. He supplied his handlers with a complete plan of the Syrian defences on the Golan Heights, the Syrian Armed Forces order of battle and a full list of the Syrian military's weapons inventory. He also arranged for trees to be planted beside every Syrian fortified position, ostensibly to shade the soldiers; the trees in fact served as targeting markers for the Israel Defense Forces. He was discovered by Syrian and Soviet intelligence, tried in secret and publicly executed in 1965. His intelligence was central to planning of the Six-Day War.

==== Wolfgang Lotz in Egypt ====
Wolfgang Lotz, who held West German citizenship, infiltrated Egypt in 1957 and gathered intelligence on Egyptian missile sites, military installations and industries. He compiled a list of German rocket scientists working for the Egyptian government and sent some of them letter bombs. After the East German head of state made a state visit to Egypt, the Egyptian government detained thirty West German citizens as a goodwill gesture; Lotz, assuming he had been discovered, confessed to his Cold War espionage activities.

==== Operation Diamond ====
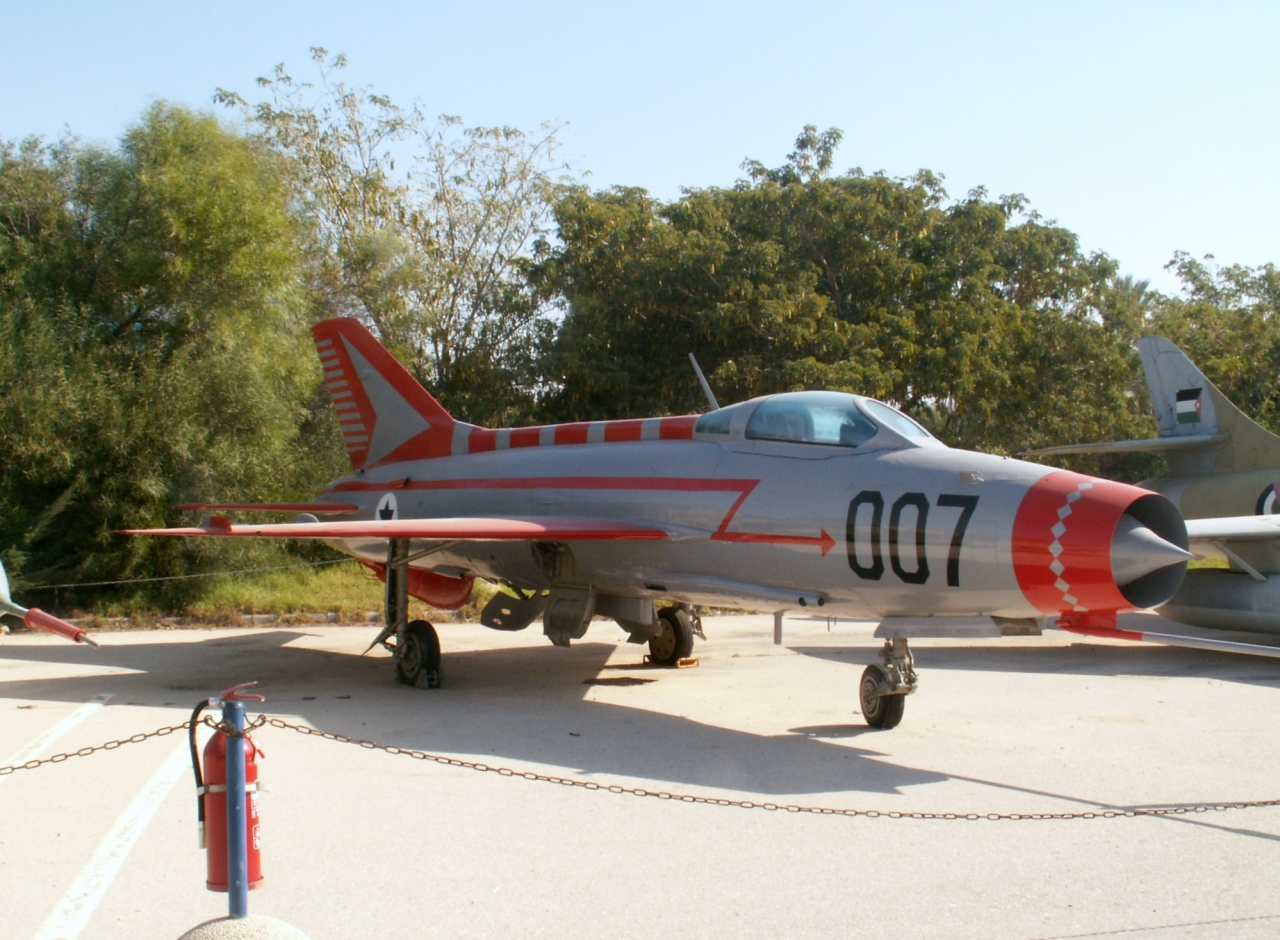
MiG-21 at the Israeli Air Force Museum in Hatzerim

In 1966, Mossad assisted the defection of Munir Redfa, an Iraqi pilot who flew his MiG-21 to Israel, and smuggled his entire family out of Iraq. Previously unknown information about the MiG-21 was subsequently shared with the United States.

=== Rescue and emigration operations ===
In September 1956, Mossad established a clandestine network in Morocco to smuggle Moroccan Jews to Israel after a ban on emigration to Israel was imposed (Operation Yachin). Mossad also assisted Operation Moses, the 1984 evacuation of Ethiopian Jews to Israel from a famine-stricken region of Sudan, and helped evacuate Bosnian Jews from war-torn Sarajevo in 1992 and 1993. Between the 1950s and the 1980s the agency maintained contact with refuseniks in the Soviet Union, helping them obtain Jewish religious items banned by the Soviet government and passing communications into and out of the country.

=== Counter-terrorism and targeted killings ===
==== Response to the Munich massacre ====
Following the 1972 Munich massacre, Mossad conducted a campaign of killings against the perpetrators in Europe and the Middle East. Among the killed were Wael Zwaiter, a member of Black September, in Rome; Mahmoud Hamshari, the alleged coordinator of the massacre, killed by an exploding telephone in his Paris apartment in 1972; Hussein Al Bashir, killed in Nicosia in 1973; Basil Al Kubaisi, killed in Paris in 1973; Zaiad Muchasi, the Fatah representative to Cyprus, killed by an explosion in his Athens hotel room in 1973; and Mohamed Boudia of the PFLP, killed in Paris in 1973. Ali Hassan Salameh, the leader of Black September, was killed by a car bomb in Beirut on 22 January 1979. Atef Bseiso, a senior PLO intelligence officer, was shot dead in Paris in 1992.

==== The Lillehammer affair ====
On 21 July 1973, Ahmed Bouchiki, a Moroccan waiter in Lillehammer, Norway, was killed by Mossad agents who had mistaken him for Ali Hassan Salameh. The agents had used forged Canadian passports, angering the Canadian government, and six of them were arrested. Israel subsequently paid compensation to Bouchiki's family.

==== Later killings ====
Mossad is held responsible for the 1988 killing in Tunisia of Khalil al-Wazir (Abu Jihad), a founder of Fatah, and is alleged to have killed Salah Khalaf, the PLO's head of intelligence, in 1991. Fathi Shiqaqi, a leader of Palestinian Islamic Jihad, was shot several times in the head outside a hotel in Sliema, Malta, in 1995. Mossad provided the intelligence for the 1992 killing of Abbas al-Musawi, the secretary-general of Hezbollah, and is alleged to have killed the senior Hezbollah commander Imad Mughniyah with an exploding headrest in Damascus in 2008. On 7 August 2020, al-Qaeda's deputy leader Abdullah Ahmed Abdullah and his daughter were shot dead by two Mossad agents in Tehran.

==== The Mashal affair ====
In retaliation for a Hamas suicide bombing in Jerusalem on 30 July 1997 that killed 16 Israelis, Benjamin Netanyahu authorised an operation against Khaled Mashal, the Hamas representative in Jordan. On 25 September 1997, Mashal was injected in the ear with a toxin, thought to have been a derivative of the synthetic opioid fentanyl. Jordanian authorities arested two Mossad agents who pretended to be Canadian tourists and trapped six more in the Israeli embassy; in exchange for their release, an Israeli physician had to fly to Amman and deliver an antidote. The failure led to the release of Sheikh Ahmed Yassin, the founder and spiritual leader of Hamas, and of multiple Hamas members. Netanyahu flew to Amman on 29 September to apologise personally to King Hussein, but was received instead by the King's brother, Crown Prince Hassan.

==== Dubai, 2010 ====
Mossad is suspected of killing Mahmoud al-Mabhouh, a senior Hamas military commander, in Dubai in January 2010. On the basis of closed-circuit television and other evidence, the team is estimated to have consisted of at least 26 agents travelling on false passports. The documents included six British passports cloned from those of real British nationals resident in Israel, five Irish passports apparently forged from those of living individuals, forged Australian passports, a genuine German passport and a false French passport. Although no direct evidence linking Mossad to the killing has been produced, Dubai's police chief said he was "now completely sure that it was Mossad" and requested arrest warrants for Netanyahu and the head of Mossad. The Irish government expelled an Israeli diplomat over the use of Irish passports.

=== Nuclear and missile counter-proliferation ===
==== Egypt: Operation Damocles ====
Operation Damocles was a campaign directed against German rocket scientists employed by Egypt. A letter bomb sent to the Heliopolis rocket factory killed five Egyptian workers, allegedly by Otto Skorzeny; Heinz Krug, the 49-year-old head of a Munich company supplying military hardware to Egypt, disappeared in September 1962 and is believed to have been killed by Skorzeny.

==== Iraq: Osirak ====
Under Operation Sphinx, between 1978 and 1981, Mossad obtained information about Iraq's Osirak nuclear reactor by recruiting an Iraqi nuclear scientist in France. On 5 April 1979, agents are believed to have triggered an explosion that destroyed 60 per cent of the reactor components being built at Toulouse; previously unknown environmental group, Groupe des écologistes français, claimed responsibility. In 1980 Yehia El-Mashad, the head of the Iraqi nuclear weapons programme, was killed in France. The reactor itself was destroyed by an Israeli air strike, Operation Opera, in 1981.

Mossad is also alleged to have killed the Canadian ballistics expert Gerald Bull, who was working for Iraq on the Project Babylon supergun, outside his Brussels apartment on 22 March 1990. Others, including Bull's son, believe Mossad has taken credit for a killing it did not commit in order to deter others from assisting hostile regimes; the CIA, Iraq and Iran have also been named as suspects.

==== Syria: Operation Orchard ====
Surveillance by Mossad of Syrian officials working under the command of Muhammad Suleiman uncovered a nuclear reactor under construction in Syria; the reactor was destroyed by the Israeli Air Force in September 2007 in Operation Orchard. Suleiman, the head of Syria's nuclear programme, was allegedly killed in 2008 by a sniper firing from a boat while he was on a beach at Tartus.

Other operations attributed to Mossad in Syria include a booby-trapped listening device planted on the main telephone cable between Damascus and Jordan, which killed twelve Syrian military and intelligence personnel on 1 April 1978; the explosion of the al-Safir chemical weapons depot on 25 July 2007, which killed fifteen Syrian personnel and ten Iranian engineers and which Syrian investigators blamed on Israeli sabotage; and the killing of Aziz Asbar, a senior Syrian scientist responsible for long-range rocket and chemical weapons programmes, by a car bomb at Masyaf on 5 August 2018.

==== Iran ====
===== Assassination of nuclear scientists =====
Mossad has been accused of assassinating Masoud Alimohammadi, Ardeshir Hosseinpour, Majid Shahriari, Darioush Rezaeinejad and Mostafa Ahmadi-Roshan, scientists involved in the nuclear program of Iran, and of the attempted assassination of Fereydoon Abbasi. Meir Dagan, director of Mossad from 2002 to 2009, did not take credit for the killings but praised them, saying that "the removal of important brains" from the Iranian nuclear project had produced so-called "white defections", frightening other scientists into asking to be transferred to civilian work.

Le Figaro reported that Mossad was behind an explosion at the Islamic Revolutionary Guard Corps' Imam Ali military base on 12 October 2011, which killed 18 people, among them General Hassan Tehrani Moghaddam, the commander of the Revolutionary Guards' missile programme.

===== Stuxnet =====
In 2010 a computer worm designed to disrupt the operation of Iranian centrifuges used for uranium enrichment was discovered. The worm, Stuxnet, was allegedly created in a joint effort by the CIA and Mossad as part of Operation Olympic Games. According to The Atlantic, the operation was "probably the most significant covert manipulation of the electromagnetic spectrum since World War II, when cryptanalysts broke the Enigma cipher that allowed access to Nazi codes". The extent of Mossad's involvement is unknown.

===== The nuclear archive =====
In 2018, Mossad agents infiltrated Iran's secret nuclear archive in Tehran and removed more than 100,000 documents and computer files to Israel. The material indicated that the Iranian AMAD Project had aimed to develop nuclear weapons. Israel shared the material with allies, including European countries and the United States.

=== Operations in support of Israel's own nuclear program ===
Operation Plumbat (1968) was an operation by Lekem and Mossad to further Israel's nuclear program. The German freighter Scheersberg A disappeared en route from Antwerp to Genoa with a cargo of 200 tons of yellowcake, said to have been transferred to an Israeli ship.

In 1986 Mossad used an undercover agent to lure Mordechai Vanunu, in a honey trap operation, from the United Kingdom to Italy, where he was abducted and returned to Israel. He was tried and convicted of treason for his role in exposing Israel's nuclear weapons programme.

=== 2024 Lebanon electronic device attacks ===
On 17 and 18 September 2024, thousands of handheld pagers and walkie-talkies used by Hezbollah exploded in two waves across Lebanon and Syria, in an attack of the Operation Grim Beeper. According to The New York Times, Mossad had secretly manufactured the devices, integrating the explosive PETN into their batteries, and sold them to Hezbollah through a shell company, Budapest-registered BAC Consulting Kft., which posed as a licensee of the Taiwanese manufacturer Gold Apollo; at least two further shell companies were created to cover the scheme. The pagers had been bought five months earlier, after Hezbollah's secretary-general Hassan Nasrallah instructed members to abandon mobile phones, out of fear that Israel hacked them. The operation was reported to have been planned over roughly a decade.

According to the Lebanese government the attacks killed 42 people, including 12 civilians, and injured more than 3,500. An unnamed Hezbollah official told Reuters that 1,500 fighters had been taken out of action by their injuries. The incident was described as Hezbollah's biggest security breach since the start of the conflict in October 2023. Ten days later Israel killed Nasrallah in an airstrike in Beirut.

Israel initially neither confirmed nor denied responsibility; in November 2024 Netanyahu acknowledged that he had approved the operation. The following month Israel permitted two Mossad officers involved in the operation to be interviewed, in disguise, on the American programme 60 Minutes; they said test dummies had been used to calibrate the charges so as to injure the person holding the device without harming bystanders, and that fake marketing videos had been produced to promote the pagers, with unattractive prices quoted to customers unconnected with Hezbollah.

=== Reported plan to install Ahmadinejad as Iran's leader ===
In 2024, former Iranian president Mahmoud Ahmadinejad said that Iran's intelligence service had established a unit to counter Mossad operations, only for its head to be exposed as a Mossad agent in 2021, and claimed that around 20 Iranian operatives had been acting as double agents for Israel.

In July 2026, The New York Times and Haaretz reported that Mossad had spent three years, beginning around 2022, cultivating Ahmadinejad as an intelligence asset, with a plan to install him as leader of a post–Islamic Republic government in case the regime collapses. According to the reports, Mossad director David Barnea met Ahmadinejad personally in Budapest in 2024 under cover of a climate-change conference at the Ludovika University of Public Service, with a second meeting in June 2025, and Israel financed his housing and travel. Haaretz described the effort as one element of a wider plan, codenamed "Puss in Boots", that also involved arming Kurdish forces in northern Iraq, mobilising minorities and opening a militia corridor toward Tehran. The plan reportedly drew strong internal opposition from Military Intelligence chief Shlomi Binder, Research Division head Ofir Mizrahi Rosen and the national security adviser Tzachi Hanegbi, who is said to have called parts of it "science fiction".

On 28 February 2026, the day Ayatollah Ali Khamenei was killed, an Israeli airstrike hit Ahmadinejad's compound in Tehran's Narmak district, reportedly targeting his bodyguards rather than Ahmadinejad himself in order to free him from house arrest; he was wounded but survived and was extracted by Mossad operatives to a safe house, which he later left after growing disillusioned with the operation. The Kurdish uprising did not happen and the Iranian state retained control. Ahmadinejad was seen on 6 July 2026 at Khamenei's funeral, and four senior Iranian officials told The New York Times that he had since been placed under IRGC house arrest after his contacts with Israel were uncovered. Ahmadinejad's office rejected the reports as fabrication.

== In popular culture ==
=== Literature ===
- In Jeffrey Archer's novel Honour Among Thieves (1993), the lead female protagonist is a Mossad agent.
- In book 4 of Mark Greaney's Gray Man series, Dead Eye, Mossad and the CIA partner to capture the world's most feared and lethal rogue former black ops agent Courtland Gentry.
- Daniel Silva's spy novel series is centered on fictional Mossad agent and assassin, Gabriel Allon. The term "Mossad" is never used in the novels, but the protagonist is described as working for Israel's intelligence service (which the characters refer to simply as "the Office").
- John Le Carre's novel The Little Drummer Girl (1983) describes a fictional Mossad operation against Palestinian terrorists.
- Frederick Forsyth's novel The Fist of God describes the inner workings of various Mossad divisions.
- Marvel Comics character Sabra is depicted as a mutant agent working for the Mossad.

=== Films ===
- The films Sword of Gideon (1986) and Munich (2005), depict Mossad agents' retaliation against Black September following the events of the 1972 Munich Olympics.
- The Impossible Spy (1987) is a TV movie about the life of top Mossad spy Eli Cohen.
- In the film Swordfish (2001), the lead character Gabriel Shear (played by John Travolta) is believed to be a Mossad agent.
- The Red Sea Diving Resort (2019) is loosely based on the events of Operation Moses and Operation Joshua (jointly referred to as Operation Brothers), in which Ethiopian Jews were covertly moved from refugee camps in Sudan to Israel.
- The House on Garibaldi Street (1979) and Operation Finale (2018) are movies about the Mossad exfiltration of Nazi war criminal Adolf Eichmann from Argentina

=== Television ===
- In the TV series The Blacklist (2013–2023), Mossad agent Samar Navabi (played by Mozhan Marnò) is one of the side characters.
- In the TV series Covert Affairs (2010–2015), Mossad agent Eyal Lavin is a recurring character.
- Since the NCIS season 3 episode "Kill Ari (Part 1)" (2005), Mossad has played an instrumental part. Mossad's presence includes one of the main characters, Agent Ziva David, who is a former Mossad agent. She originally filled the position of Mossad liaison to NCIS, until the end of season 7, when she became a full-time NCIS agent. Her father, Eli David, was the director of Mossad until the season 10 episode "Shabbat Shalom", when he was killed. Many other characters have been included in the show from Mossad, including Michael Rivkin and Ari Haswari. Some episodes of the show have taken place in Israel.
- The Spy (2019) is a web television miniseries on the life of top Mossad spy Eli Cohen.
- Tehran (2020–present) is a spy thriller television series about a Mossad agent working undercover in Iran.

=== Documentary and non-fiction ===
- The Spy Machine (1998), a British documentary special about the work of the Mossad
- Rise and Kill First (2018), a book about history of assassinations carried out by Israeli agencies including Mossad

== See also ==
- List of alleged operations by Mossad
- Mossad activities in Iran
- Israeli espionage in the United States
- Targeted killings by Israel
- List of Israeli assassinations
- Duvdevan Unit – Israel's undercover strike unit
- Special Activities Division
- Unit 8200, Israeli Intelligence Corps SIGINT and cyber unit
- Yamam, Israel's elite Border Police SWAT unit
