= Yossi Cohen =

Israeli intelligence officer (born 1961)

- יוסי כהן
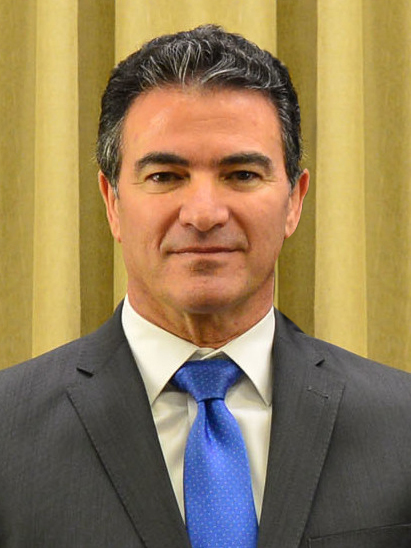
- Cohen in 2016

Director of Mossad
- In office 5 January 2016 – 1 June 2021
- Prime Minister: Benjamin Netanyahu
- Preceded by: Tamir Pardo
- Succeeded by: David Barnea

9th National Security Advisor (Israel)
- In office August 2013 – January 2016
- Preceded by: Yaakov Amidror
- Succeeded by: Eytan Ben-David

Personal details
- Born: 10 September 1961 (age 64) Jerusalem

Yosef "Yossi" Meir Cohen (Hebrew: יוסף מאיר כהן; born 10 September 1961) is an Israeli intelligence officer.

After mandatory service in the Israel Defense Forces, Cohen joined the Mossad, the national intelligence agency of Israel, in 1982. He rose to lead Mossad's Tzomet Division and was the agency's deputy director from 2011 to 2013, when he was appointed National Security Advisor to Prime Minister Benjamin Netanyahu.

In 2016, Cohen succeeded Tamir Pardo as the Mossad's director. During his tenure, he oversaw Mossad's operation to steal Iran's nuclear archive and was the chief negotiator during the Abraham Accords. He stepped down from the agency in 2021.

== Early life ==
Cohen was born in Jerusalem to a religious family and grew up in the Katamon neighborhood. His father Aryeh was an eighth-generation Sabra who was descended from one of the founding families of the Mea Shearim neighborhood of Jerusalem. He worked in a senior position at Bank Mizrahi and was also an Irgun veteran. His mother Mina was a teacher and school principal. She was a seventh-generation Sabra, born to a Jewish family rooted in Hebron, now part of the West Bank.

Cohen was raised in a religious household and was a member of the Bnei Akiva religious Zionist youth movement. He attended the religious high school Yeshivat Or Etzion.

== Career ==
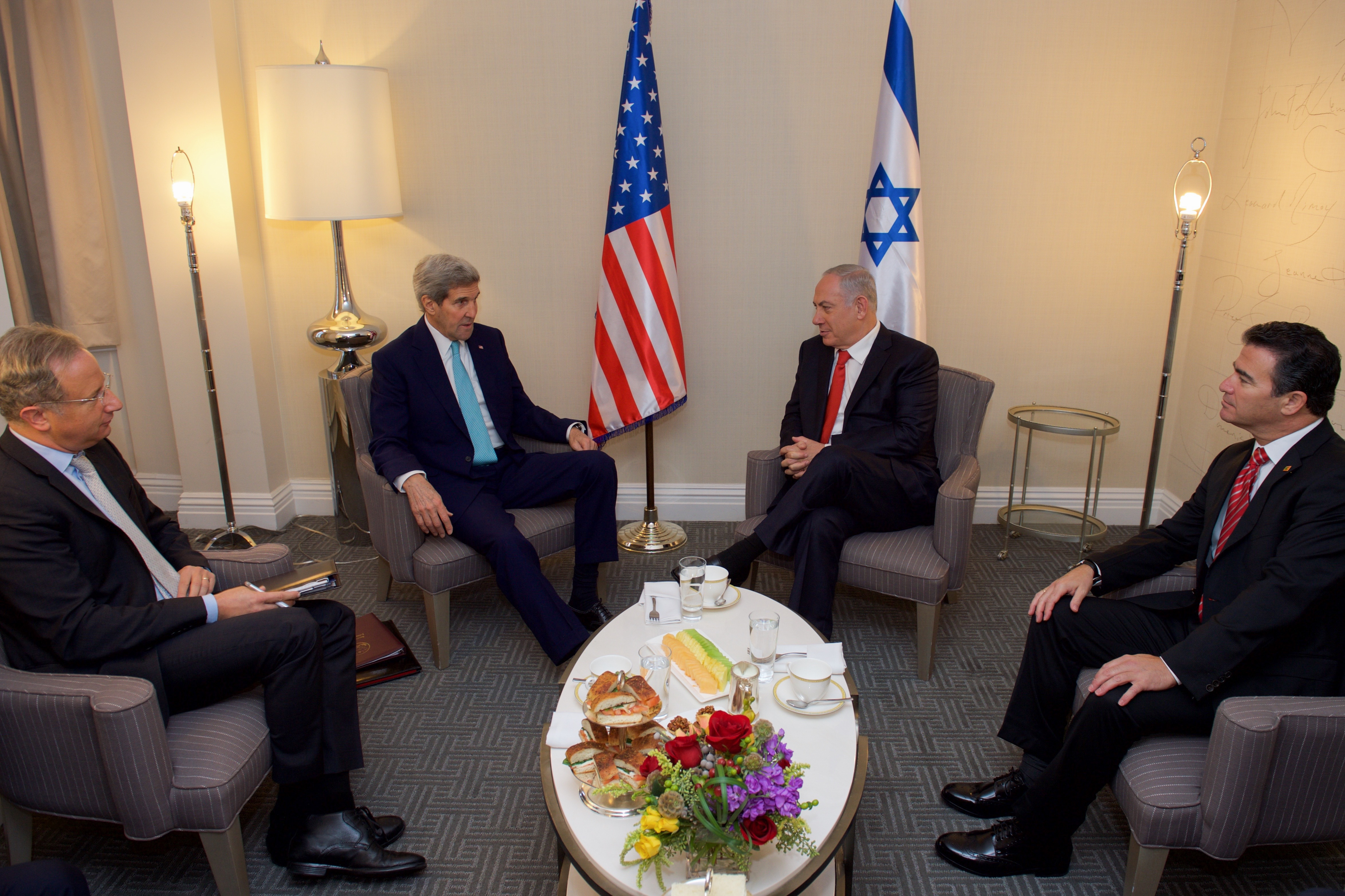
U.S. Secretary of State John Kerry and Israeli Prime Minister Benjamin Netanyahu, flanked by U.S. Special Envoy for Israeli–Palestinian Negotiations Frank Lowenstein and Israeli National Security Adviser Yossi Cohen, on 11 November 2015, at the Mayflower Hotel in Washington, D.C.

Cohen was drafted into the Israel Defense Forces in 1979. He volunteered as a paratrooper in the 35th Paratroopers Brigade. He served as a soldier and a squad leader. After being discharged, he studied at university in London, and joined the Mossad in 1982. His initial codename was "Callan," after the British TV series that he was a fan of. He became a case officer, charged with recruiting and handling spies in foreign nations. While in training, he had been the only religious candidate in the Mossad's case officer course at the time.

He ran agents in a number of countries over his career, and rose to lead the Mossad's collections division ("Tsomet"). From 2011 to 2013, he was the deputy director of the Mossad, serving under Tamir Pardo. He was known publicly as "Y" (Hebrew: "י") in this post. Cohen won the prestigious Israel Security Prize for his Mossad work.

In August 2013, he was appointed the National Security Advisor to the Prime Minister of Israel, Benjamin Netanyahu.

=== Mossad director ===
In December 2015, Cohen was appointed to succeed Tamir Pardo as director of the Mossad, and assumed office in January 2016. Cohen is one of the closest officials to Netanyahu.

In January 2018, Cohen oversaw the Mossad operation to steal Iran's secret nuclear archive in Tehran and smuggle it out of the country. According to the Jerusalem Post, a map of nuclear sites captured in the operation has not yet been made public. Among the assassinations attributed to the Mossad during Cohen's tenure were those of Hamas drone expert Mohamed Zouari in Tunisia, Hamas rocket expert Fadi Mohammad al-Batsh in Malaysia, and Iranian nuclear program chief Mohsen Fakhrizadeh in Iran.

Cohen has also been the chief Israeli official in charge of managing Israel's largely clandestine relations with various Arab nations. He has often met with representatives of Egypt, Jordan, the United Arab Emirates, Saudi Arabia, and Qatar and helped negotiate Netanyahu's visit to Oman in 2018. Reportedly, he met Sudan's chief of intelligence, though the Sudanese intelligence service denied it. He was Israel's chief negotiator in arranging the Israel–United Arab Emirates peace agreement.

In June 2021, Cohen retired from Israel's national intelligence agency.

== Political views ==
=== Israeli–Palestinian conflict ===
At a conference in 2019 in Herzliya, Israel, Cohen announced that Israel has a unique window of opportunity to reach a comprehensive peace agreement with the Palestinians. He stated that this is also the view of the Mossad unit whose job it is to analyze diplomatic opportunities. Given the present good relations with the United States, the Russian government, and restoration of partial diplomatic ties with the Arab states of the Persian Gulf centered around opposition to Iran, in Cohen's view there is a one-time opportunity for Middle East peace under terms very beneficial to Israel that the Israeli government must now seize.

The Jerusalem Post reported in September 2019 that Cohen "does not believe anything will move on the peace process until Palestinian Authority President Mahmoud Abbas leaves office."

=== Relationship with Netanyahu ===
Netanyahu reportedly considered Cohen and Israeli Ambassador to the US Ron Dermer to be the two best candidates to succeed him as prime minister when he leaves office. In a 2021 interview, Cohen stated that his "the relationship of trust" with Netanyahu was "very useful for the Mossad's operations and its development," but denied that it had affected the Mossad's independence.

== Controversies ==
=== James Packer gift ===
In August 2021, Attorney General of Israel Avichai Mandelblit announced an investigation into claims that Cohen had accepted a $20,000 gift from Australian billionaire James Packer. In 2022, Cohen returned the gift to Packer, and in 2023, the Attorney General's office concluded the investigation, finding that the gift had been approved by the Mossad's legal adviser.

=== Channel 13 investigation ===
In December 2021, Channel 13 released a report claiming that Cohen had had an affair with a flight attendant in 2018 and had revealed classified information to her.

=== Intimidation of Fatou Bensouda ===
In spring 2024, it was reported that Cohen had threatened Prosecutor of the International Criminal Court Fatou Bensouda and her family when he was Mossad director after Bensouda opened an investigation into alleged Israeli war crimes. Tamir Pardo, Cohen's predecessor as Mossad director, compared the allegations to "like Cosa Nostra blackmail," saying it was "at the extreme of things that must not be done." Haaretz journalist Gur Megiddo subsequently reported that Cohen had attempted to convince Congolese president Joseph Kabila to assist in the intimidation and that he had been threatened by government officials over his investigation into Cohen.

== Assessments ==
Intelligence reporter Ronen Bergman has written that Cohen has a reputation as a tough boss, that he speaks fluent English, French, and Arabic.

In September 2019, The Jerusalem Post listed Cohen as the most influential Jew of the year.

== Personal life ==
Cohen lives in Modi'in-Maccabim-Re'ut and is a Masorti Jew. He and his wife Aya have four children. One of his sons, Yonatan, is a former officer in Unit 8200 and has cerebral palsy. He also has one granddaughter. He is also a marathon runner and is known as 'The Model' for his stylish appearance.
