= David Barnea =

Chief of the Israeli Mossad

- דָּוִד בַּרְנֵעַ
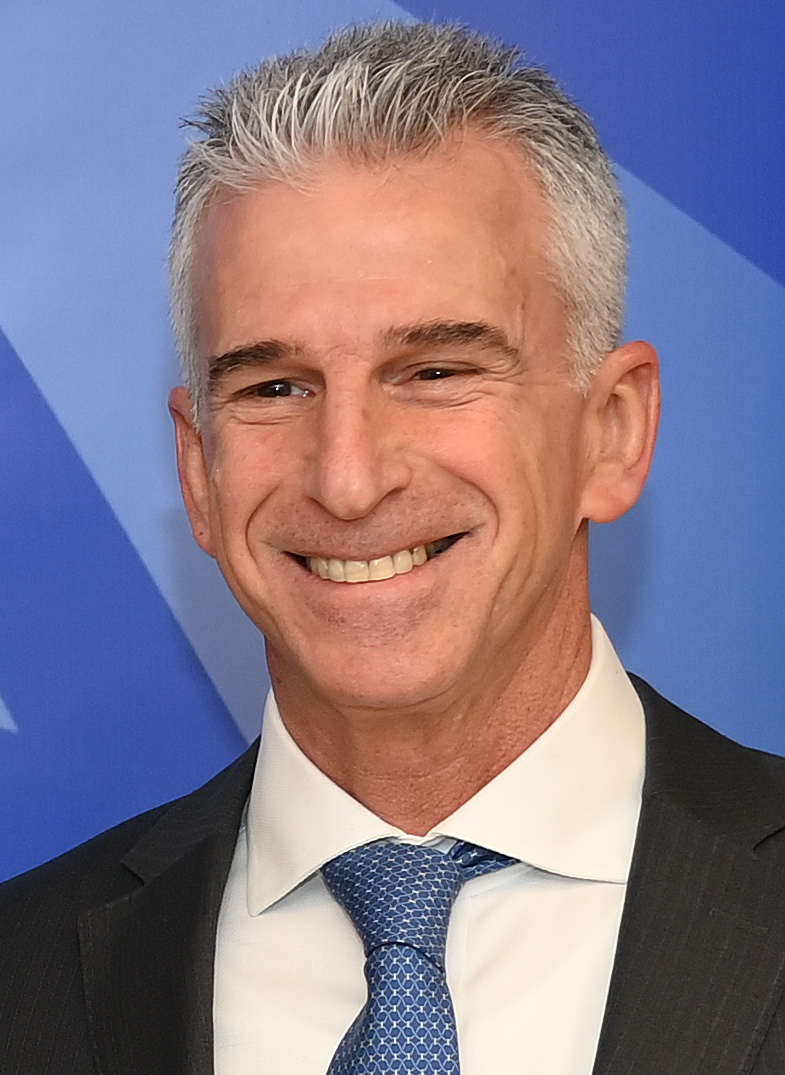
- Barnea in 2023

Director of Mossad
- In office 1 June 2021 – 2 June 2026
- Prime Minister: Benjamin Netanyahu; Naftali Bennett; Yair Lapid; Benjamin Netanyahu
- Preceded by: Yossi Cohen
- Succeeded by: Roman Gofman

Personal details
- Born: 29 March 1965 (age 61) Ashkelon, Israel
- Children: 4
- Education: New York Institute of Technology (BS); Pace University (MBA)

David "Dadi" Barnea (Hebrew: דָּוִד (דָדִי) בַּרְנֵעַ; born 29 March 1965) is an Israeli intelligence officer who served as the 13th director of the Mossad from June 2021 to June 2026. He succeeded Yossi Cohen and was in turn succeeded by Roman Gofman on 2 June 2026. He left office in June 2026 and was succeeded by Roman Gofman.

== Early life and education ==
Barnea was born in Ashkelon and grew up in Rishon Lezion. His father, Joseph Brunner (Barnea), fled with his family from Nazi Germany and immigrated to Israel at the age of three, in 1933. Joseph was a graduate of Yeshivat Hapoel HaMizrachi (Note: The school was affiliated with the Hapoel HaMizrachi political movement.) in Bnei Brak and joined the Palmach at the age of 16. He fought with the Third Battalion of the organization in Nabi Yusha and Safed and then served as an officer with the rank of Lieutenant Colonel in the Israeli Air Force. He was also a manager at Tadiran. His mother, Naomi, was born on board SS Patria and worked as a teacher and school principal.

Barnea studied at the Military Boarding School for Command in Tel Aviv,⁣ and enlisted in the Israel Defense Forces (IDF) in 1983. He did his military service with the General Staff Reconnaissance Unit (Sayeret Matkal). He later studied in the United States, obtaining a bachelor's degree from the New York Institute of Technology and an MBA from Pace University. He then worked as a business manager at an investment bank in Israel.

== Career ==
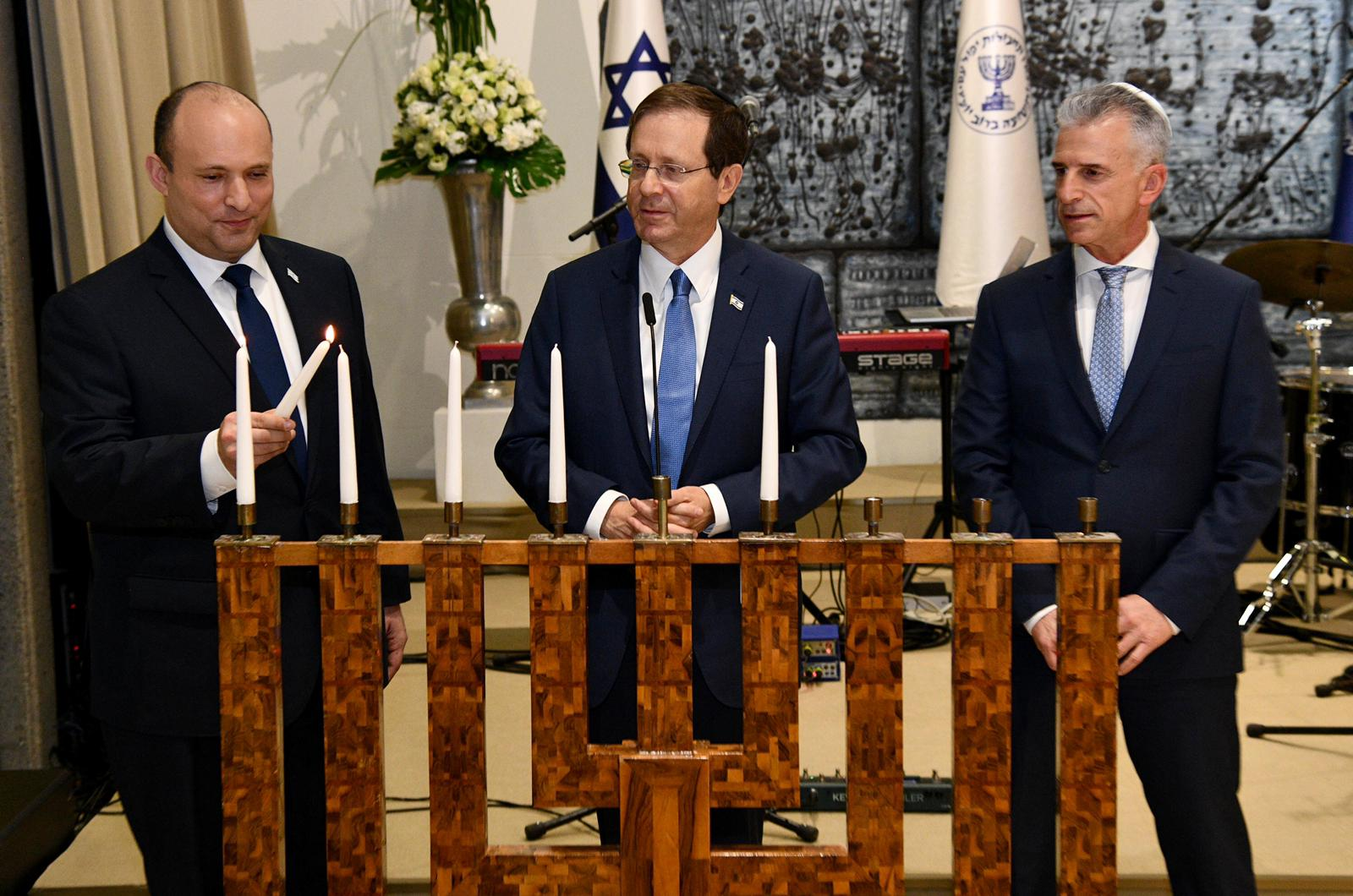
Prime Minister Naftali Bennett, President Isaac Herzog and David Barnea in December 2021

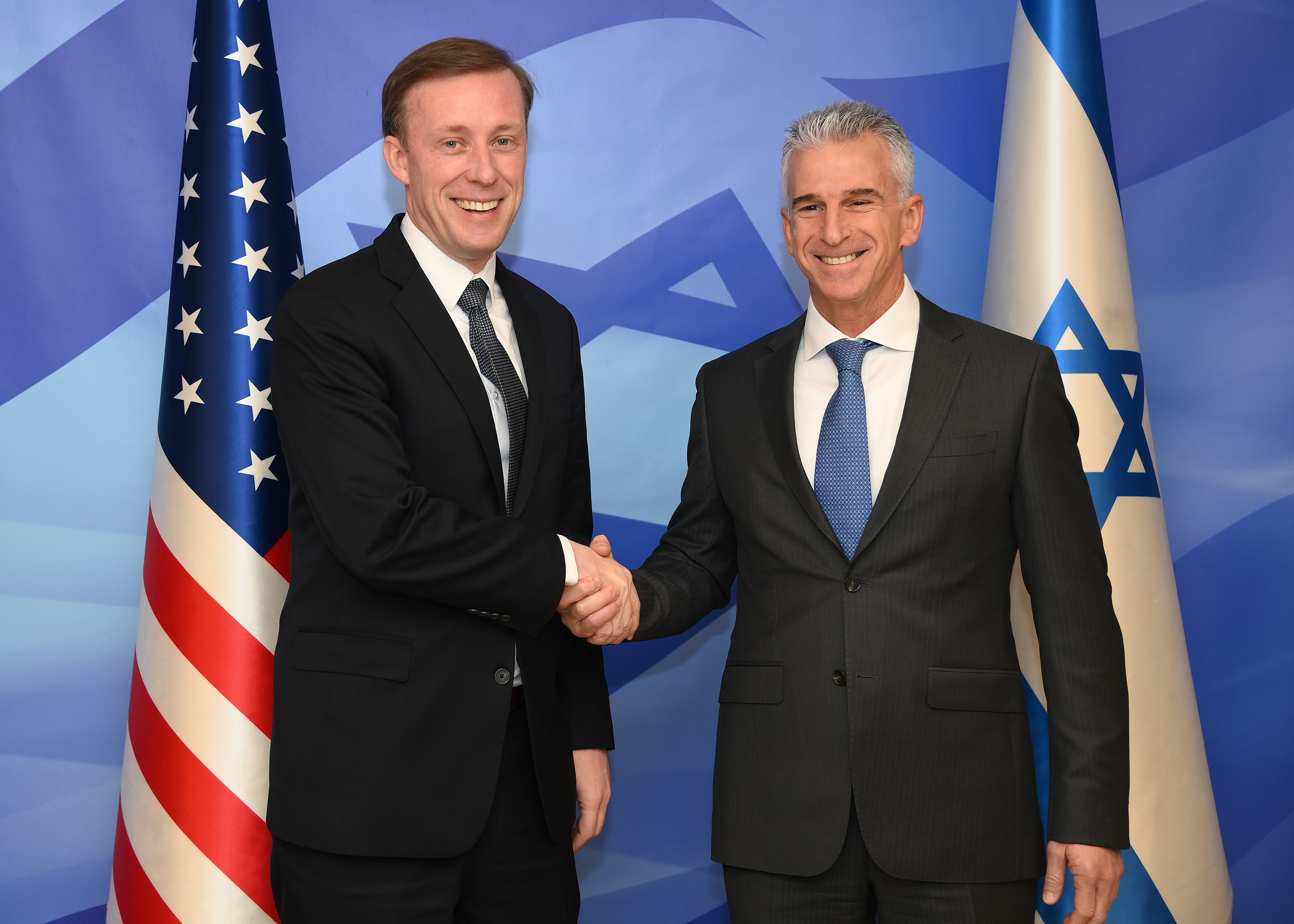
Barnea meets with U.S. National Security Adviser Jake Sullivan in Israel on 19 January 2023

In 1996, Barnea joined the Mossad. He served in the Tzomet Division, commanding operational units in Israel and abroad. For two and a half years, he served as deputy head of the Keshet Division, which is tasked with infiltrating and monitoring targets. In 2013, he was appointed head of the Tzomet Division. While Barnea ran Tzomet, four awards for Israeli national security were presented to the division. In 2019, he was appointed deputy head of the Mossad. In June 2021, he was appointed head of the Mossad.

After the beginning of Gaza war, Barnea pushed for a deal with Hamas to secure the release of Israeli hostages. On 9 November 2023, Barnea met with CIA director William J. Burns and Qatari prime minister Mohammed bin Abdulrahman al-Thani in Doha. The possibilities of a ceasefire and the release of hostages were discussed. In addition to Burns, Barnea was also included in the talks between US president Joe Biden and Prime Minister Benjamin Netanyahu about the release of hostages. Barnea prevailed against Netanyahu, who is said to have long preferred a purely military solution.

In July 2025, Barnea asked the US for assistance in persuading countries in Asia and Africa to accept displaced Palestinians from Gaza.

In the lead-up to the 2026 Iran war, Barnea reportedly assured Prime Minister Netanyahu that the agency could catalyze a widespread domestic uprising in Iran within days of the start of military operations. However, several weeks into the war, intelligence assessments from both Israel and the U.S. concluded that no such large-scale rebellion had materialized, leading to reports of frustration within the Prime Minister's Office. On 21 April, during a Remembrance Day ceremony, Barnea revealed that a Mossad agent, only known as "M", was killed during operations against Iran in the war, although where, when or which incident that he died was never stated.

After Barnea's career in Mossad, he later joined a defense company called Ondas Defense Ltd. as the global president and chairman on 3 August 2026, with the company stated that Barnea will focus on "the Middle East, Europe and Asia, where governments are accelerating investment in autonomous defense, counter-UAS, intelligence, surveillance and reconnaissance, resilient communications, precision-strike and ground robotic systems."

== Personal life ==
Barnea is married and is a father of four. He has a Haredi brother.
