= Yael Man =

Canadian-Israeli spy

- Born: Eileen Steiner; November 1936
- Died: August 27, 2021 (aged 84)
- Occupation: Intelligence agent
- Employer: Mossad
- Known for: 1973 Israeli raid in Lebanon

Yael Man (born Eileen Steiner) was a Canadian-born Israeli intelligence agent who was instrumental in the 1973 Israeli raid in Lebanon known as "Operation Spring of Youth". Posing as an American screenwriter living in Beirut, she carried out surveillance of three Palestine Liberation Organization officials who were killed in the raid.

== Early life ==
She was born in Canada in 1936 and moved to New Jersey with her family at the age of three. Her father was a physicist and her mother was a housewife. Her family was Jewish but not religiously observant. After finishing school she wanted to become a veterinarian but instead studied nursing at her father's insistence. She abandoned her nursing studies and married a Zionist student with whom she moved to New York City, where she studied psychology and computer science at Columbia University. She worked as a computer programmer in New York after graduating in 1961. She and her husband separated in 1965. She had become interested in Zionism and in February 1968 she moved to Israel, where she worked as a computer programmer.

== Recruitment by Mossad ==
In 1971, through an acquaintance who worked as a bodyguard for the organization, she volunteered to join Mossad. After being interviewed first by Mike Harari, who commanded the Caesarea division and then by the Mossad chief Zvi Zamir, she was accepted and underwent training to become an agent. Her Mossad code name was Nielsen. She was seen within the organization as "an exceptionally talented and coolheaded operative, who used her quiet charisma and her attractive appearance as a powerful weapon".

== Operation Spring of Youth ==
In preparation for the 1973 attacks, Yael Man was sent to Beirut to carry out surveillance on three of the targets: Kamal Adwan, Muhammad Youssef al-Najjar and Kamal Nasser. All three lived in two adjacent high-rise apartment buildings on Verdun Street.

Her cover story was that she was an American novelist working on a screenplay for a film to be made in Lebanon about the 19th century British adventurer and antiquarian Lady Hester Stanhope. She prepared for the role by taking a short course with the Israeli author Shabtai Teveth in "the ways a writer lives and works".

She arrived in Beirut in January 1973 and rented an apartment directly across from those occupied by the three targets. From this vantage point she was able to observe and pass on to her handlers "the daily and nightly routine in the three apartments, when the lights are on and off, who is reflected in the windows, and at what times, details about the three's cars and visitors to their homes, whether there is security and at what times", and other components of a "complete and accurate intelligence picture".

After the operation, in which the three targets were killed, Yael Man remained in Beirut for five days, keeping up her routine activities and maintaining her cover story before flying alone to Brussels. A month later Zamir and Harari took her to meet prime minister Golda Meir "to show her what a female fighter looked like".

== Later life ==
Yael Man retired from Mossad after serving for 15 years. She later married her Hebrew teacher, whom she met shortly before her retirement. She died in August 2021.
