= List of Israeli assassinations =

The following is a list of alleged and confirmed assassinations reported to have been conducted by the State of Israel. It includes attempts against individuals who were reportedly (or confirmed to have been) specifically targeted by various Israeli security, intelligence and law enforcement agencies, including the Israel Defense Forces and the Mossad.

Logo used by the Israel Defense Forces to announce targeted killings of Hamas, Hezbollah and Houthi members since 2024.

Logo used by the Israel Defense Forces to announce targeted killings of the Iranian Ayatollah regime.

When carrying out targeted assassinations, the Israeli government refers to these operations as “eliminations”. Individuals who are killed in such operations are described as having been “eliminated”, using the term “Husal” (Hebrew: חוסל, Hebrew pronunciation: [χuˈsal]).

These operations have often been described by Israeli officials as preventive or counterterrorism measures, while these measures have been criticized by critics of the Israeli government's actions, particularly when conducted outside Israel’s borders or in areas of ongoing conflict.

== 1950s ==
Date	Place	Country	Target	Description	Action	Killer
July 11, 1956	Gaza Strip	Egypt	Col. Mustafa Hafez	Egyptian military official who organized Palestinian fedayeen raids from Gaza into Israel	Parcel bomb	Israel Defense Forces operation directed by Yehoshafat Harkabi.
July 14, 1956	Amman	Jordan	Lt. Col. Salah Mustafa	Egyptian Military attache in Amman, organized fedayeen raids from Jordan into Israel	Parcel bomb	Israel Defense Forces operation directed by Yehoshafat Harkabi.

== 1960s ==
Date	Place	Country	Target	Description	Action	Killer
September 11, 1962	Munich	West Germany	Heinz Krug	West German rocket scientist working for Egypt's missile program	Abducted from his company offices on Munich's Schillerstrasse, his body was never found. Swiss police later arrested two Mossad agents for threatening the daughter of another scientist and found that they were responsible for the killing. Part of Operation Damocles.	Mossad
November 28, 1962	Heluan	United Arab Republic	5 Egyptian factory workers	Workers employed at Factory 333, an Egyptian rocket factory.	Letter bomb sent bearing Hamburg post mark. Another such bomb disfigured and blinded a secretary. Part of Operation Damocles.	Mossad
February 23, 1965	Montevideo	Uruguay	Herberts Cukurs	Aviator who had been involved in the murders of Latvian Jews during the Holocaust	Lured to and killed in Montevideo by agents under the false pretense of starting an aviation business.	Mossad

== 1970s ==
Date	Place	Country	Target	Description	Action	Killer
July 8, 1972	Beirut	Lebanon	Ghassan Kanafani	Palestinian writer, political figure, editor-in-chief of Al-Hadaf, and spokesperson of the PFLP, who was assassinated in a car bombing in Beirut after the Lod Airport massacre.	Killed by car bomb along with his 17-year-old niece Lamees.	Mossad
July 25, 1972	Beirut	Lebanon	Attempted killing of Bassam Abu Sharif	Popular Front for the Liberation of Palestine Information Office. He held a press conference with Ghassan Kanafani during the Dawson's Field hijackings justifying the PFLP's actions.	He lost four fingers, and was left deaf in one ear and blind in one eye, after a book sent to him that was implanted with a bomb exploded in his hands.	Mossad
October 16, 1972	Rome	Italy	Abdel Wael Zwaiter	Libyan embassy employee, cousin of Yassir Arafat, PLO representative, poet and multilingual translator, considered by Israel to be a terrorist for his alleged role in the Black September group and the Munich massacre, though Aaron Klein states that 'uncorroborated and improperly cross-referenced intelligence information tied him to a support group' for Black September.	Shot 12 times by two Mossad gunmen as he waited for an elevator to his apartment near Piazza Avellino.	Mossad
December 8, 1972	Paris	France	Mahmoud Hamshari	PLO representative in France and coordinator of the Munich Olympic Games massacre.	Killed by bomb concealed in his telephone.	Mossad
January 24, 1973	Nicosia	Cyprus	Hussein Al Bashir (a.k.a. Hussein Abu-Khair/Hussein Abad).	Fatah representative in Nicosia, Cyprus and PLO liaison officer with the KGB.	Killed by bomb in his hotel room bed.	Mossad
April 6, 1973	Paris	France	Basil Al Kubaisi	PFLP member and American University of Beirut Professor of International Law	Killed on a street in Paris by two Mossad agents.	Mossad
April 9, 1973	Beirut	Lebanon	Kamal Adwan	Black September commander and member of the Fatah central committee	Killed in his apartment in front of his children during Operation Spring of Youth, either shot 55 times or killed with a grenade.	Sayeret Matkal led by Ehud Barak
April 9, 1973	Beirut	Lebanon	Muhammad Youssef Al-Najjar	Black September Operations officer and PLO official	Shot dead in his apartment together with his wife during Operation Spring of Youth.	Sayeret Matkal together with Mossad.
April 9, 1973	Beirut	Lebanon	Kamal Nasser	Palestinian Christian poet, advocate of non-violence and PLO spokesman	Shot dead in his apartment during Operation Spring of Youth. According to Palestinian sources his body was left as if hanging from a cross. A woman neighbour was shot dead when she opened her door during the operation.	Sayeret Matkal
April 11, 1973	Athens	Greece	Zaiad Muchasi	Fatah representative to Cyprus	Killed in hotel room.	Mossad
June 28, 1973	Paris	France	Mohammad Boudia	Black September operations officer	Killed by pressure-activated mine under his car seat.	Mossad
July 21, 1973	Lillehammer	Norway	Attempted killing of Ali Hassan Salameh	High-ranked leader in the PLO and Black September who was behind the 1972 Munich Olympic Games massacre	Ahmed Bouchiki, an innocent waiter believed to be Ali Hassan Salameh, killed by gunmen. Known as the Lillehammer affair.	Mossad
March 27, 1978	East Berlin	East Germany	Wadie Haddad	PFLP commander, who masterminded several plane hijackings in the 1960s and 1970s.	He apparently died of cancer in an East Berlin hospital, reportedly untraced by Mossad. Mossad never claimed responsibility. Aaron Klein states that Mossad passed on through a Palestinian contact a gift of chocolates laced with a slow poison, which effectively caused his death several months later.	Mossad
January 22, 1979	Beirut	Lebanon	Ali Hassan Salameh	High-ranked leader in the PLO and Black September who was behind the 1972 Munich Olympic Games massacre	Killed by a remote-controlled car bomb, along with four bodyguards and four innocent bystanders.	Mossad

== 1980s ==
Date	Place	Country	Target	Description	Action	Executor
June 13, 1980	Paris	France	Yehia El-Mashad	Egyptian nuclear scientist, lecturer at Alexandria University	Killed in his room at the Méridien Hotel in Operation Sphinx. Marie-Claude Magal, prostitute, client of El-Meshad, pushed under a car and killed in the Boulevard Saint-Germain.	Mossad
September 1981	São Paulo	Brazil	José Alberto Albano do Amarante	A Brazilian Air Force lieutenant colonel, assassinated by the Israeli intelligence service to prevent Brazil from becoming a nuclear nation.	He was contaminated by radioactive material.	Samuel Giliad or Guesten Zang, a Mossad agent, an Israeli born in Poland.
August 21, 1983	Athens	Greece	Mamoun Meraish	Senior PLO official	Shot in his car from motorcycle.	Mossad
June 9, 1986	Athens	Greece	Khalid Nazzal	Secretary of the DFLP (Democratic Front for Liberation of Palestine)	Killed in Athens by Mossad agents who entered Greece with fake passports, shot Nazzal while leaving his hotel, and fled the country.	Mossad
October 21, 1986	Athens	Greece	Munther Abu Ghazaleh	High-ranked leader in the PLO. Senior member of the National Palestinian Council, the Revolutionary Council of Al Fatah and the Supreme Military Council of the Revolutionary Palestinian Forces.	Killed by a car bomb	Mossad
April 16, 1988	Tunis	Tunisia	Abu Jihad	Second-in-command to Yassir Arafat	Shot dead in front of his family in the Tunis Raid by Israeli commandos under the direction of Ehud Barak and Moshe Ya'alon, and condemned as a political assassination by the United States State Department.	Israel Defense Forces
July 14, 1989	Alexandria	Egypt	Said S. Bedair	Egyptian scientist in electrical, electronic and microwave engineering and a colonel in the Egyptian army	Fell to his death from the balcony of his brother's apartment in Camp Chezar, Alexandria, Egypt. His veins were found cut and a gas leak was detected in the apartment. Arabic and Egyptian sources claim that the Mossad assassinated him in a way that appears as a suicide.	?

== 1990s ==
Date	Place	Country	Target	Description	Action	Executor
March 20, 1990	Brussels	Belgium	Gerald Bull	Canadian engineer and designer of the Project Babylon "supergun" for Saddam Hussein's government	Shot at door to his apartment	Attributed to Mossad by several sources, and widely believed to be a Mossad operation by intelligence experts, Gordon Thomas states it was the work of Mossad's director Nahum Admoni. Israel denied involvement at the time, and several other countries had interests in seeing him dead.
February 16, 1992	Nabatieh Governorate	Lebanon	Abbas al-Musawi	Secretary-General of Hezbollah	After 3 IDF soldiers were killed by Palestinian militants of the PIJ during a training exercise at Gal'ed in Israel, Israel retaliated by killing Musawi in his car, together with his wife Sihan and 5-year-old child Hussein, with seven missiles launched from two Apache Israeli helicopters. Hezbollah retaliated by attacking Israel's embassy in Argentina.	Israel Defense Forces
June 8, 1992	Paris	France	Atef Bseiso	Palestinian official involved in Munich Massacre	Shot several times in the head at point-blank range by 2 gunmen, in his hotel (Aaron Klein's "Striking Back")	Mossad, with French complicity, according to the PLO, but French security sources suggested the hand of Abu Nidal.
November 24, 1993	Shuja'iyya	Gaza Strip	Emad Akel	Hamas commander	Killed by Israeli soldiers in disguise	Israel Defense Forces
October 26, 1995	Sliema	Malta	Fathi Shaqaqi	Head of Palestinian Islamic Jihad	Shot and killed in front of Diplomat Hotel.	Mossad.
January 6, 1996	Beit Lahia	Gaza Strip	Yahya Ayyash	"The Engineer", Hamas bomb maker	Head blown off by cell phone bomb in Osama Hamad's apartment, responding to a call from his father. Osama's father, Kamal Hamad, was a known collaborator with Israel, and it was bruited in Israel that he had betrayed his son's friend for $1 million, a fake passport and a U.S. visa.	Covert Israeli operation
September 25, 1997	Amman	Jordan	Khaled Mashal (failed attempt)	Hamas political leader	Attempted poisoning. Israel provided antidote, after pressure by Clinton. Canada withdrew Ambassador.	Two Mossad agents with Canadian passports arrested

== 2000s ==
- 2000, September 29–2001, April 25. According to Palestinian sources, the IDF assassinated 13 political activists in Area A under full Palestinian Authority, with 9 civilian casualties.
- 2001 Israel killed 35 suspected Palestinian militants.
- 2002 Israel killed 72 suspected militants.
- 2003 (August) The Israeli government authorized the killing of Hamas's entire political leadership in Gaza, 'without further notice,' in a method called 'the hunting season' in order to strengthen the position of moderates and Mahmoud Abbas.
- 2005 In February Israel announced a suspension of targeted killings, while reserving the right to kill allegedly 'ticking bombs'.

Date	Place	Location	Target	Description	Action	Executor
November 9, 2000	Beit Sahur	West Bank	Hussein Mohammed Abayat (37)	Senior commander of Fatah paramilitary group Tanzim	Killed while traveling in his Mitsubishi by a Hellfire anti-tank missile fired from an Israeli Apache helicopter. Two others were killed in the operation. Leader of Tanzim in Beit Sahur, accused of shootings in West Bank.	Israel Defense Forces
November 22, 2000	Morag	Gaza Strip	Jamal Abdel Raziq (39) and Awni Dhuheir (38)	Senior official of the Fatah faction Tanzim	Killed on the Rafah-Khan Yunis western road near the junction leading to Morag settlement while in a Honda Civic with the driver, Awni Dhuheir when their car was machine-gunned from two tanks at close range. The first version, they were about to attack Morag; the second version, Raziq was targeted after firing at IDF soldiers. His uncle was later sentenced to death for collaborating in his nephew's death by furnishing Israel with details. Two bystanders in a taxi behind them also killed (Sami Abu Laban, 29, baker, and Na’el Shehdeh El-Leddawi, 25, student).	Israel Defense Forces
November 23, 2000	Nablus	West Bank	Ibrahim 'Abd al-Karim Bani 'Odeh (34)	Unknown. Had been jailed for 3 years by the PNA until two weeks before his death.	Killed while driving a Subaru near Al-Salam mosque. Israeli version, he died from his own rudimentary bomb. Palestinian version: his cousin ‘Allan Bani ‘Oudeh confessed to collaborating with Israel in an assassination, and was convicted and shot in Jan 2001.	?
December 11, 2000	Nablus	West Bank	Anwar Mahmoud Hamran (28)	A PIJ bombing suspect. Jailed for 2 years by PNA and released 6 weeks before his death.	Targeted on a campus of Al-Quds Open University while waiting for a taxi-cab. Shot 19 times by a sniper at 500 yards. IDF version shot by soldiers in self-defence. Palestinian version, he died with books in his hand.	Israel Defense Forces
December 12, 2000	al-Khader	West Bank	Yusef Ahmad Mahmoud Abu Sawi (28)	Unknown	Targeted and shot by a sniper at 200 metres, 17 bullets.	Israel Defense Forces
December 13, 2000	Hebron	West Bank	‘Abbas ‘Othman El-‘Oweiwi (25)	Hamas activist	Targeted and shot 3 times in head and chest by a sniper while standing in front of his store in Wadi Al-Tuffah Street.	Israel Defense Forces
December 14, 2000	Burin	West Bank	Saed Ibrahim Taha al-Kharuf (35)		Targeted and shot dead.	Israel Defense Forces.
December 14, 2000	Junction of Salah el-Din near Deir al-Balah	Gaza Strip	Hani Hussein Abu Bakra (32)	Israeli version. Hamas activist shot as he tried to fire from a pistol.	Driver of a Hyundai taxi van. Palestinian version: shot while reaching for his identity card which he was asked to produce when stopped. 4 of seven passengers wounded, one of whom, ‘Abdullah ‘Eissa Gannan, 40, died 10 days later.	Israel Defense Forces.
December 17, 2000	Qalandiyya	West Bank	Samih Malabi	Tanzim officer.	Mobile phone bomb.	?
December 31, 2000	Tulkarem	West Bank	Thabat Ahmad Thabat	Classified by Israel as head of Fatah's Tanzim cell. Dentist, lecturer on public health at Al Quds University, and Fatah Secretary-General on the West Bank.	Israeli Special Forces sniper shot him as he drove his car from his home in Ramin, classified as an apparent political assassination.	Israel Defense Forces
February 13, 2001	Gaza City	Gaza Strip	Mas’oud Hussein ‘Ayyad (50)	Lieutenant-colonel in Force 17, an aide of Yasser Arafat held responsible for a failed mortar attack on a Jewish settlement in Gaza. The IDF also alleged, without providing evidence, that he intended to form a Hezbollah cell in the Gaza Strip.	Killed while driving a Hyundai in Jabalia Camp by a Cobra gunship launching 3rockets.	Israeli Air Force
February 19, 2001	Nablus	West Bank	Mahmoud Suleiman El-Madani (25)	Hamas activist	Shot by two men in plainclothes as he left a mosque. As they fled, according to the Palestinian version, covering fire was provided by an Israeli unit on Mount Gerizim.	
April 2, 2001	Al-Barazil neighborhood of Rafah	Gaza Strip	Mohammed ‘Attwa ‘Abdel-‘Aal (26)	PIJ	Combat helicopters fired three rockets at his Peugeot Thunder, also hitting the taxi behind, whose occupants survived.	Israeli Air Force
April 5, 2001	Jenin	West Bank	Iyad Mohammed Hardan (26)	Head of the PIJ in Jenin. IDF version. He was involved in the 1997 Mahane Yehuda Market Bombings.	Blown up in a public phone booth, when, reportedly, an Israeli helicopter was flying overhead. Baruch Kimmerling classifies it as an apparent political execution to provoke Palestinians.	
April 25, 2001	Rafah	West Bank	Ramadan Ismail ‘Azzam (33); Samir Sabri Zo’rob (34); Sa’di Mohammed El-Dabbas (32); Yasser Hamdan El-Dabbas (18)	Popular Resistance Committees members	Blown up while examining a triangular object with flashing lights that had been reported as lying near the border earlier that day. Palestinians say the object exploded as an Israeli helicopter passed overhead.	
May 5, 2001	Bethlehem	West Bank	Ahmad Khalil ‘Eissa Assad (38)	PIJ activist	Hit while leaving his house for work, reportedly from shots (15) fired from the Israeli military outpost at Tel Abu Zaid, 250 metres away. His niece, Ala, was also injured. Israel said the victim intended to carry out armed operations in the future inside Israel.	Israel Defense Forces
May 12, 2001	Jenin	West Bank	Mutassam Mohammed al-Sabagh (28)	Fatah activist	In a car with two Palestinian intelligence officers, who managed to escape on sighting an Apache helicopter, which struck it with three missiles. The two officers were also wounded. A fourth missile struck a Palestinian police car killing Sergeant Aalam al-Raziq al-Jaloudi and injuring Lieutenant Tariq Mohammed Amin al-Haj. Two bystanders were also wounded. Israeli Army accused the three of plotting attacks on nearby settlers.	Israeli Air Force
June 24, 2001	Nablus	West Bank	Osama Fatih al-Jawabra (Jawabiri) (29)	al-Aqsa Martyrs Brigade militant. His name was on an Israeli wanted list submitted to PNA.	Bomb exploded as he picked up a phone in a public telephone booth. Two brothers, Malik Shabaro (2), and Amar Shabaro (4) injured.	Alleged by PNA to be IDF, but denied by the Israeli government.
July 17, 2001	Bethlehem	West Bank	Omar Ahmed Sa’adeh (45)	Hamas leader	Killed by two wire-guided missiles fired by two Israeli helicopter gunships at his garden hut, also killing Taha Aal-Arrouj (37). His brother Izhaq Ahmed Sa’adeh (51), a peace activist, and his cousin Hamad Saleh Sa’adeh (29), were killed by a further missile as they rushed towards the rubble. A dozen people nearby were wounded. Israel maintained that it was a preventive attack on a planner of a terrorist attack at the Maccabiah Games.	Israeli Air Force
July 23, 2001	'Anin, west of Jenin	West Bank	Mustafa Yusuf Hussein Yassin (26)	?	Released from Israeli prison earlier that day. According to his wife, he opened the door on hearing noises outside their home and was shot at point-blank range in front of his family. Israeli sources say he was planning to bomb Israeli targets.	Israel Defense Forces
July 25, 2001	Nablus	West Bank	Salah Nour al-Din Khalil Darwouza (38)	Hamas	Car hit while driving in Nablus. He evaded two missiles from an Apache helicopter, but the car was hit by a further 4. Israel claimed he planned bombing attacks on French Hill, and Netanya.	Israeli Air Force
July 31, 2001	Nablus	West Bank	Jamal Mansour (41); Jamal Salim Damouni (42)	High-ranking official of Hamas' West Bank political wing	Killed when office struck by helicopter-launched missiles as Mansour was giving an interview to journalists in the Palestinian Centre for Studies and Media. 4 others killed in the room: Mohammed al-Bishawi (28); Othman Qathnani (25); Omar Mansour (28); Fahim Dawabsha, (32). Two children, aged 5 and 8, outside were also killed, and three more adults injured by shrapnel.	Israel Defense Forces
August 5, 2001	Tulkarm	West Bank	Amer Mansour Habiri/Aamer Mansour al-Hudairy (22)	Hamas	Missiles fired at the car.	Israel Defense Forces
August 20, 2001	Hebron	West Bank	Imad Abu Sneneh	Leader of Tanzim	Shot and killed.	Israeli undercover team
August 27, 2001	Ramallah	West Bank	Abu Ali Mustafa (63)	Head of the Popular Front for the Liberation of Palestine and senior executive leader of the PLO.	Killed by laser-guided missiles fired from Apache helicopters while talking on the phone in his office. Baruch Kimmerling classifies it as an apparent political execution to provoke Palestinians. Other sources say Shin Bet convinced the Israeli Cabinet he was connected to terrorism.	Israeli Air Force
September 6, 2001	Tulkarm	West Bank	'Omar Mahmoud Dib Subuh (22); Mustafa 'Ahed Hassan 'Anbas (19).	Unknown	Targeted and killed by a helicopter missile in an attempt to assassinate 4 Palestinians, of whom 2 died.	Israel Defense Forces
October 14, 2001	Qalqiliya	West Bank	'Abd a-Rahman Sa'id Hamed (33)	Unknown	Targeted by a sniper and shot at the entrance to his house.	Israel Defense Forces
October 15, 2001	Nablus	West Bank	Ahmad Hassan Marshud (29)	Unknown	Targeted killing by explosion.	?
October 18, 2001	Beit Sahur	West Bank	Jamal 'Abdallah 'Abayiat (35); 'Issa 'Atef Khatib 'Abayiat (28); 'Atef Ahmad 'Abayiat (25).	Unknown	The three, all relatives were killed while driving a Jeep.	Israel Defense Forces
October 22, 2001	Nablus	West Bank	Ayman Halawah (26).	Unknown	Killed while riding in a car.	?
31 October 2001	Hebron	West Bank	Jamil Jadallah al-Qawasmeh (25).	Unknown	Killed by a helicopter missile that struck his house.	Israeli Air Force
2 November 2001	Tulkarm	West Bank	Fahmi Abu 'Easheh (28); Yasser 'Asira (25)	Unknown	Killed by gunfire whole driving in a car.	Israel Defense Forces
23 November 2001	Far'a	West Bank	Mahmoud a-Shuli (Abu Hanud) (33); Maamun 'Awaisa (22); Ayman 'Awaisa (33).	Unknown	all three killed while riding in a taxi by a helicopter missile.	Israel Defense Forces
December 10, 2001	Hebron	West Bank	Burhan al-Haymuni (3); Shadi Ahmad 'Arfah (13)	None	Two brothers killed in a vehicle hit by a helicopter missile during a targeted killing of a person in a nearby car.	Israel Defense Forces
January 14, 2002	Tulkarem	West Bank	Raed (Muhammad Ra'if ) Karmi (28)	Head of the Tanzim in Tulkarem	He had planned the murders of two Israelis in Tulkarem and was behind a failed assassination attempt on an Israeli Air Force colonel. After surviving an attempt to kill him by helicopter on September 6, 2001, he was persuaded by Arafat to desist from violence but killed twenty-three days after a ceasefire was in place because the Shin Bet was convinced they would never have the same operational opportunity to take him out. Killed from a bomb planted in a cemetery wall, set off by a UAV circling above when he passed by it on a visit to his mistress, to create the impression he had blown himself up accidentally.	Baruch Kimmerling classifies it as an apparent political execution to provoke Palestinians.
January 22, 2002	Nablus	West Bank	Yusif Suragji	West Bank head of Izz ad-Din al-Qassam Brigades. Three other Hamas members also killed. Palestinian Authority claims it was an assassination.	Killed in a raid on an alleged explosives factory.	Israeli Defence Forces
January 24, 2002	Khan Yunis	Gaza Strip	Adli Hamadan (Bakr Hamdan)	Senior Hamas member	missile attack on car.	Israeli Air Force
February 4, 2002	Rafah	Gaza Strip	Ayman Bihdari	DFLP member wanted for 25 August 2001 raid in which three Israeli soldiers were killed.	missile attack on car. Four other DFLP members killed.	Israeli Air Force
February 16, 2002	Jenin	West Bank	Nazih Mahmoud Abu a-Saba'	Second ranking Hamas officer in Jenin.	Killed by a bomb planted in his car, in a targeted killing.	Israel Defense Forces
March 5, 2002	al-Birah	West Bank	Mohammad (Diriyah Munir) Abu Halawa (23); Fawzi Murar (32); 'Omar Hussein Nimer Qadan (27).	Wanted AMB member.	Missile fired at car from a helicopter, Murar and Qadan according to B'tselem were not combatants at the time.	Israeli Air Force
March 6, 2002	Gaza City	Gaza Strip	Abdel Rahman Ghadal	Hamas member	Missile attack on his home.	Israeli Air Force
March 9, 2002	Ramallah	West Bank	Samer Wajih Yunes 'Awis (29)	Not a participant in hostilities at the time, according to B'tselem.	Killed by a missile fired from a helicopter, which struck a car he was travelling in.	Israel Defense Forces
March 14, 2002	Anabta	West Bank	Mutasen Hamad (Mu'atasem Mahmoud 'Abdallah Hammad) (28); 'Atef Subhi Balbisi (Balbiti) (25).	Hamad was an Al Aqsa Martyrs Brigade member and bomb maker.	3 missiles fired from an Israeli attack helicopter at Hamad's car, near a chicken farm. A Palestinian source say a bystander, a chicken farmer (Maher Balbiti) was also killed. An Israeli sources identify him as a terrorist.	Israeli Air Force
April 5, 2002	Tubas	West Bank	Qeis 'Adwan (25); Saed 'Awwad (25); Majdi Balasmeh (26); Ashraf Daraghmeh (29); Muhammad Kmeil (28); Munqez Sawafta (29)	Qeis 'adwan was a Hamas activist and bomb maker to whom several suicide bomb attacks were attributed.	Targeted in a combined drone, tank and special forces siege during Operation Defensive Shield. Given hospitality in his house by Munqez Sawafta. After hours of gunfire, and a refusal to surrender, a D-9 armored bulldozer crushed part of the house and the remaining 3 were shot.	Israel Defense Forces
April 22, 2002	Hebron	West Bank	Marwan Zaloum (59) and Samir Abu Rajoub.	Tanzim Hebron leader and Force 17 member	Killed by a helicopter missile while driving a car. Zaloum was on an Israeli wanted list, and thought responsible for shootings, including that Shalhevet Pass. Israeli helicopter strike.	Israeli Air Force
May 22, 2002	Balata refugee camp, Nablus	West Bank	Iyad Hamdan (22); 'Imad Khatib (25); Mahmoud 'Abdallah Sa'id Titi (30); Bashir Yaish (30)	Unknown, the first three were targeted.	All four killed by a shell shot from an Israeli tank. Yaish was not involved in hostilities at the time.	Israel Defense Forces
June 24, 2002	Rafah	Gaza Strip	Yasir Raziq, 'Amr Kufa.	Izzeddln al-Qassam Brigades leaders.	Missiles fired at two taxis, killing two other passengers (reportedly also Hamas activists), the two drivers and injuring 13 bystanders.	Israeli Air Force
June 30, 2002	Nablus	West Bank	Muhaned Taher, Imad Draoza.	Muhaned Taher, nom de guerre "Engineer 4", was a master Hamas bomber claimed by Israel to be responsible for both the Patt Junction Bus Bombing and the Dolphinarium discotheque suicide bombing.	Died with a deputy in a shoot-out with Israeli raiding commandos.	Israel Defense Forces
June 17, 2002	al-Khader	West Bank	Walid Sbieh	A senior al-Aqsa Martyrs Brigades commander	Shot by an Israeli sniper in a targeted killing while in his car.	Israel Defense Forces
July 4, 2002	Gaza City	Gaza Strip	Jihad Amerin (also known by his alias, (Aqid) Jihad Amrain))	Al-Aqsa Martyrs Brigades Colonel.	Killed in a car bomb.	Israel Security Forces.
July 23, 2002	Gaza City	Gaza Strip	Salah Shahade (Shehadeh)	Leader of Hamas Izz ad-Din al-Qassam Brigades	Killed by 2,205-pound explosive dropped by an F-16. The attack also killed fourteen other Palestinians including his wife and nine children. Yesh Gvul and Gush Shalom tried to have Dan Halutz indicted, but the case was dropped. Killed on the eve of an announced unilateral cease-fire by Tanzim.	Israeli Air Force. 27 reserve pilots undersigned a pilots' letter refusing to serve in IAF sorties over the West Bank and Gaza in protest.
August 6, 2002	Jaba, Jenin	West Bank	Ali Ajuri, Murad Marshud	Classified as people not known to be involved in the fighting (B'tselem).	Ajuri (21) was killed by an air-to-surface missile, during an attempt to arrest him. Murad Marshud (19) killed as bystander.	Israeli Air Force. 27 reserve pilots undersigned a pilots' letter refusing to serve in IAF sorties over the West Bank and Gaza in protest.
August 14, 2002	Tubas	West Bank	Nassa Jarrar	Senior member of Hamas's militant wing.	Died crushed by rubble when an IDF bulldozer demolished his house. The IDF admitted it compelled Nidal Abu M'khisan (19) at gunpoint to act as a human shield and get the victim out of his house. Jarrar shot the youth, possibly believing he was an IDF soldier. Israel suspected him of preparing a bomb an Israeli high-rise building.	Israel Defense Forces
October 13, 2002	Beit Jala	West Bank	Muhammad Ishteiwi 'Abayat (28)	?	Killed in an explosion in a telephone booth, in a targeted killing.	
October 29, 2002	Tubas	West Bank	Assim Sawafta Age 19	Hamas Izzedine al Qassam military leader.	Killed by an undercover army unit, after failing to surrender.	Israel Defense Forces
November 4, 2002	Nablus	West Bank	Hamed 'Omar a-Sader (36); Firas Abu Ghazala (27).	Unknown	Killed by a car-bomb. According to B'tselem, Firas Abu Ghazala was not engaged in hostilities at the time.	Israel Defense Forces
November 26, 2002	Jenin	West Bank	Alah Sabbagh (26); Imad Nasrti/'Imad Nasharteh (22);	Sabbagh reportedly an Al-Aqsa Martyrs Brigade member, Nasrti Hamas local leader.	Killed in an Israeli airstrike on a house in the Jenin refugee camp by two missiles fired into a room.	Israeli Air Force
December 23, 2002	wadi Burqin near Jenin	West Bank	Shumann Hassan Subuh (29) and Mustafa Kash (26/30)	Subah was a Hamas commander and bomb maker.	Ambushed by IDF unit as Kash drove a tractor between Burqin and Al-Yamun.	Israel Defense Forces
January 30, 2003	Burqin	West Bank	Faiz al-Jabber (32)	?	Targeted when Israeli forces opened fire at a Fatah group. He fled, was wounded, then shot dead at close range.	Israeli Border Police
March 8, 2003	Gaza City	Gaza Strip	Ibrahim al-Makadmeh	Gaza Dentist. Second-in-Command of Hamas's Military Wing. Hamas political leader.	He and three of his aides killed by helicopter-fired missiles.	Israeli Air Force
March 18, 2003	Baqat al-Hatab	West Bank	Nasser Asida	Hamas commander	Shot while hiding in a cave, On Israel's most wanted list as alleged mastermind of attacks on Israeli settlements in the West Bank.	Israel Defense Forces's Kfir Brigade
March 25, 2003	Bethlehem	West Bank	Mwafaq 'Abd a-Razaq Shhadeh Badawneh (40); 'Alaa Iyad (24); Nader Salameh Jawarish (25); Christine George S'adeh (11)	?	Israeli Defence Forces version, agents were ambushed and shot dead 2 Palestinian gunmen, and a girl in a car that blundered into the battle and was believed to be part of the ambush. The girl's parents and sister were wounded. B'tselem reports that three of the 4 did not participate in hostilities at the time, but were killed during the targeted assassination by an undercover team of Nader Gawarish and Nader Salameh Jawarish	Israel Defense Forces's Kfir Brigade
April 8, 2003	Zeitoun, Gaza City	Gaza Strip	Said al-Arabid	Hamas	Israeli Air Force strike on his car followed by helicopter missiles. Seven Palestinians, ranging from 6 to 75, were killed, 47 wounded, 8 critically.	Israeli Air Force
April 9, 2003	Gaza City	Gaza Strip	Mahmoud Zatma	Islamic Jihad Movement in Palestine Senior Commander, Bomb Maker	Apache helicopter hit the car he was driving in Gaza City, 10 bystanders injured.	Israeli Air Force
April 12, 2003	Tulkarm	West Bank	Jasser Hussein Ahmad 'Alumi (23)	?	Killed by gunfire. The object of a targeted killing.	Israel Defense Forces
April 10, 2003	Tulkarm	West Bank	Yasser Alemi	Fatah, Tanzim	Shot and killed as a fugitive in Tulkarm.	Israel Border Police
April 29, 2003		Gaza Strip	Nidal Salameh	PFLP	Killed when 4 helicopter missiles struck his car	Israeli Air Force
May 8, 2003	Gaza City	Gaza Strip	Iyad el-Bek (30)	Aide of Salah Shehade, Hamas activist.	Killed by three helicopter missiles fired at a car.	Israeli Air Force
June 11, 2003	Gaza City	Gaza Strip	Tito Masoud (35) and Soffil Abu Nahez (29)	Massoud was a senior member of Hamas's military wing.	Retaliatory strike one hour after the Davidka Square bus bombing. 4 bystanders also killed	Israeli Air Force
June 12, 2003	Gaza City	Gaza Strip	Jihad Srour and Yasser Taha	Hamas members	Killed by between 4 and 6 helicopter missiles while their car was caught in a traffic jam, near a cemetery where victims of the June 11 strike the day before were being buried. Collateral damage consisted of 6 other victims including Taha's wife and child. 25 others were injured by the blasts.	Israeli Air Force
June 12, 2003	Jenin	West Bank	Fadi Taisir Jaradat (21); Saleh Suliman Jaradat (31)	Saleh Suliman Jaradat was an Islamic Jihad activist	Both killed at the entrance of their home, the latter being the target. Fadi Jaradat did not participate in hostilities at the time, according to B'tselem.	Israel Defense Forces. Their killing led to their sister/cousin Hanadi Jaradat's suicide attack on the Maxim restaurant.
June 21, 2003	Hebron	West Bank	'Abdallah 'Abd al-Qader Husseini al-Qawasmeh (41)	Wanted by IDF	Shot dead after getting out of a taxi before a mosque. Three vans approached, with a dozen Israelis disguised as Palestinian labourers, and he was shot in the leg, perhaps while fleeing to a nearby field, and then finished off.	Israel Defense Forces. Their killing led to their sister/cousin Hanadi Jaradat's suicide attack on the Maxim restaurant.
August 21, 2003	Gaza City	Gaza Strip	Ismail Abu Shanab (52)	Engineer and high-ranking Hamas military commander. High-ranking Hamas official	Missile strike, ending a cease-fire.	Israeli Air Force
August 24, 2003	Gaza City	Gaza Strip	Walid el Hams, Ahmed Rashdi Eshtwi (24), Ahmed Abu Halala, Muhammad Abu Lubda	Hamas members. Eshtwi was said by the IDF to be a Hamas liaison officer with West Bank cells.	Twin helicopter missile strike as the five were sitting in a vacant lot near a Force 17 base. Several bystanders were injured, and a further Hamas member critically wounded.	Israeli Air Force
August 26, 2003	Gaza City	Gaza Strip	Khaled Massoud brother of Tito Massoud, killed 3 months earlier.	Hamas Qassam rocket designer, alleged to be involved in mortar strikes.	Attempted assassination of Massoud, who was with two other Hamas activists, Wa'al Akilan and Massoud Abu Sahila, in a car. Alerted to the threat, the three men managed to escape from their car as 3 missiles struck it and killed a passing 65-year-old Jabaliya donkey driver Hassan Hemlawi, who was driving his cart. Two bystanders were also wounded, including four children.	Israeli Air Force
August 28, 2003	Khan Yunis	Gaza Strip	Hamdi Khalaq	Izzedine al Qassam	3 missiles struck hit a donkey cart Khalaq was driving. Three Gazans nearby were wounded. The IDF said he was on his way to a mortar attack on an Israeli settlement in the Gaza Strip.	Israel Defense Forces
August 30, 2003	On a road linking the Nusseirat and Bureij refugee camps	Gaza Strip	Abdullah Akel (37) and Farid Mayet (40)	Hamas senior operatives, said to have fired mortar shells and Qassam rocks.	Killed when 4 helicopter missiles struck their pickup truck. Seven others Palestinians were wounded by the fire. IDF soldiers machine-gunned an 8-year-old girl Aya Fayad the same day in the Khan Yunis refugee camp, while, according to IDF reports, shooting at road-bomb militants detonating bombs on a patrol route.	Israeli Air Force
September 1, 2003	Gaza City	Gaza Strip	Khader Houssre (36)	Hamas member	Killed when 4 helicopter missiles struck a car with 3 Hamas members, in a crowded side street. The second was critically wounded, while the other managed to flee. 25 bystanders were injured in the strike.	Israeli Air Force
October 28, 2003	Tulharm Refugee Camp	West Bank	Ibrahim 'Aref Ibrahim a-N'anish	Wanted by IDF	Shot dead, unarmed, as he drove his car to the entrance of the refugee camp.	Israel Defense Forces
December 25, 2003	Gaza City	Gaza Strip	Mustafa Sabah	Senior Hamas bomb-maker, thought behind explosions that blew up 3 Merkava tanks inside the Gaza Strip.	Killed when 3 helicopter missiles destroyed a Palestinian Authority compound where Sabah worked as a part-time guard.	Israeli Air Force
December 25, 2003	Gaza Strip	Gaza Strip	Mekled Hameid	PIJ military commander.	Helicopter gunship attack on the car, killing its occupants, including two PIJ members. Two bystanders were also reported killed and some 25 bystanders injured.	Israeli Air Force
February 2, 2004	Nablus	West Bank	Hashem Da'ud Ishteiwi Abu Hamdan (2); Muhammad Hasanein Mustafa Abu Hamdan (24); Nader Mahmoud 'Abd al-Hafiz Abu Leil (24); Na'el Ziad Husseini Hasanein (22).	All four wanted by the IDF	Killed in a car struck by a missile fired from a helicopter.	Israel Defense Forces
February 7, 2004	Gaza City	Gaza Strip	Aziz Mahmoud Shami	Islamic Jihad Movement in Palestine local field commander, claimed to be behind a 1995 double suicide bombing in Netanya.	Missile strike incinerated his car while he drove down a crowded street, and a passing 12-year-old boy was killed, and 10 others wounded.	
February 28, 2004	Jabaliya refugee camp	Gaza Strip	Amin Dahduh, Mahmoud Juda, Aiyman Dahduh.	PIJ military commander	Missiles hit his car as it travelled from Gaza city to the refugee camp. Two passengers are also killed and eleven bystanders wounded.	Israeli helicopters.
March 3, 2004	Gaza City	Gaza Strip	Tarad Jamal, Ibrahim Dayri and Ammar Hassan.	Senior Hamas members	Missiles from helicopter fired at their car as it drove down a coastal road.	Helicopter strike.
March 16, 2004	Gaza City	Gaza Strip	Nidal Salfiti and Shadi Muhana	Islamic Jihad Movement in Palestine	Israeli missile strike.	
March 22, 2004	Gaza City	Gaza Strip	Ahmed Yassin	Co-founder and leader of Hamas	The purpose of the operation was to strengthen the position of Mahmoud Abbas. As Yassin left a mosque at dawn, he, 2 bodyguards, and 7 bystanders killed by Israeli Air Force AH-64 Apache-fired Hellfire missiles. 17 bystanders were wounded.	Israeli Air Force
April 17, 2004	Gaza City	Gaza Strip	Abdel Aziz al-Rantisi	Co-founder and leader of Hamas, and successor of Ahmed Yassin as leader of Hamas after his death	The purpose of the operation was to strengthen the position of Mahmoud Abbas. Al-Rantisi was killed by helicopter-fired missiles, along with his son and bodyguard. Several bystanders were injured.	Israeli Air Force
April 22, 2004	Talluza	West Bank	Yasser Ahmed Abu Laimun (32)	Lecturer in hospital management at the Arab-American University in Jenin, mistaken for Imad Mohammed Janajra. IDF initially reported he was a Hamas member.	Initially reported shot after shooting and then running away from an Israeli attack dog, trained to seize wanted individuals. His widow testified that he was shot, while in his garden, from a distance of 200 yards by gunfire from Israeli soldiers behind an oak tree. The IDF apologized.	Israel Defense Forces
May 5, 2004	Talluza	West Bank	Imad Mohammed Janajra (31)	Hamas leader	Ambushed in an olive grove, after an earlier attempt, mistaking Abu Laimun for him. Said by IDF to be armed and approaching them.	Golani Brigade's elite Egoz unit.
May 30, 2004	Zeitoun	Gaza Strip	Wael Nassar	Hamas mastermind behind the mine that blew up an Israeli troop carrier raiding Gaza City, on May 11, killing 6 soldiers.	He was killed on his motorcycle, together with his aide, by a missile strike which also wounded 7 civilians, including a woman and two children. A second following missile killed another Hamas member nearby.	Helicopter strike
June 14, 2004	Nablus	West Bank	Khalil Mahmoud Zuhdi Marshud (24)'Awad Hassan Ahmad Abu Zeid (24).	Head of Al-Aqsa Brigades in Nablus	Earlier targeted in a Nablus missile attack on a car on May 3, killing 3 Al Aqsa Brigade members. He was in a different vehicle. Killed when a missile hit a car outside the Balata refugee camp, also killing PIJ members Awad Abu Zeid e Mohammed Al Assi (Israeli version). Abu Zeid did not engage in hostilities when killed (B'tselem report). Israeli Army radio said the decision to kill him followed on several failures to arrest him. The same day, an attempt to kill Zakaria Zubeidi, head of the Jenin al Aqsa Brigades, failed.	Israel Defense Forces
June 26, 2004	Nablus	West Bank	Naif Abu-Sharah (40) Jafer el-Massari Fadi Bagit Sheikh Ibrahim and the others.	Respectively Tanzim Hamas Nablus officer; Islamic Jihad officer.	Killed by IDF paratroopers together with six other men found huddled in a secret tunnel beneath a house in the old city of Nablus, after trailing a fugitive into the house.	Israeli paratroopers.
July 22, 2004	Gaza City	Gaza Strip	Hazem Rahim	Islamic Jihad in Palestine member	Helicopter gunship missile strike on a car, killing Rahim and his deputy, Rauf Abu Asi. According to Israeli sources, Rahim had been seen on video two months earlier brandishing body parts of ambushed Israeli soldiers.	Israel Defense Forces
July 29, 2004	Near Rafah refugee camp	Gaza Strip	Amr Abu Suta, Zaki Abu Rakha	Abu al-Rish Brigades leader.	In a car, together with a bodyguard, incinerated by Israeli helicopter fire. Accused of involvement in the shooting of an IDF officer, and a 1992 killing in a Jewish settlement in the Gaza Strip.	Israel Defense Forces
August 17, 2004	Gaza City	Gaza Strip	Five dead. Four Unidentified?	The target was a Hamas Izz ad-Din al-Qassam Brigades leader, Ahmed al-Jabari.	The five, included al-Jabari's 14-year-old son, his brother, his nephew and son-in-law, were killed in a drone missile strike on al-Jabari's home. About a dozen other Palestinians wounded. al-Jabari survived the attempt.	Israeli Air Force
September 13, 2004	Jenin	West Bank	Mahmoud Ass'ad Rajab Abu Khalifah (25), Amjad Husseini 'Aref Abu Hassan, Yamen Feisal 'Abd al-Wahab Ayub	Al-Aqsa Brigades leader, deputy to Zakariya Zubeidi.	Killed together with two aides (Israeli version) when a helicopter missile struck his car in the city centre. Amjad Hassan and Yamen Feisal 'Abd al-Wahab Ayub were not, according to B'tselem, involved in the fighting.	Israeli Air Force
September 20, 2004	Gaza City	Gaza Strip	Khaled Abu Shamiyeh (30)	Hamas rocketry mechanic.	Car hit by missile	Israel Defense Forces
September 21, 2004	Gaza City	Gaza Strip	Nabil al-Saedi (34), Rabah Zaqout	Hamas mid-ranking operatives.	Killed when their Jeep was struck by a missile. 8 bystanders including 2 children were wounded.	Israel Defense Forces
September 27, 2004	Damascus	Syria	Izz Eldine Subhi Sheik Khalil (42)	Hamas senior official. A Gazan deported by Israel in 1992.	Blown up by a bomb hidden in his SUV when he answered a call on his mobile phone, triggering the explosion. Israel did not claim responsibility but Ariel Sharon's spokesman Raanin Gissin said:'Our longstanding policy has been that no terrorist will have any sanctuary and any immunity,' and Moshe Ya'alon commented that action should be adopted against "terror headquarters in Damascus" in the wake of the recent Beersheba bus bombings.	
September 27, 2004	Khan Yunis	Gaza Strip	Ali al-Shaeir (26)	Popular Resistance Committee member	Killed while an Israeli helicopter gunship fired several missiles at a car in Abbassam, believed to hold their target, Muhammad Abu Nasira. The latter, with two others of the group, sustained injuries, and al-Shair died.	Israeli helicopter strike
October 6, 2004	al-Shati refugee camp	Gaza Strip	Bashir Khalil al-Dabash, (38/42) and Zarif Yousef al-'Are'ir (30)	Head of Islamic Jihad's military wing, al-Quds Brigades.	Both killed by helicopter missile fired at their Subaru in 'Izziddin al-Qassam Street in downtown Gaza. Three passers-by were wounded. One of three operations in Operation Days of Penitence that killed 5 other Palestinian militants.	Israeli Air Force
October 21, 2004	Gaza City	Gaza Strip	Adnan al-Ghoul Imad Abbas	2nd in command of Hamas, and Qassem rocket expert.	Killed together with his aide Imad Abbas when their car was destroyed by a missile from an Apache helicopter. Four bystanders were wounded.	Israeli Air Force
July 15, 2005	East of Salfit	West Bank	Samer Abdulhadi Dawhqa, Mohammad Ahmed Salameh Mar'i (20), Mohammad Yusef 'Abd al-Fatah A’yash (22)	Alleged to be 'ticking bombs'.	Killed in an olive grove, or, according to B'tselem, in a cave where two were hiding. The first two died immediately in a missile and gunfire strike by Apache helicopters. The third was taken to Ramallah in critical condition, but then seized by Israeli forces and taken off in a military ambulance. He died later, and neither he nor Mar'i, according to B'tselem, were involved in the fighting.	Israel Defense Forces
July 16, 2005	Khan Yunis	Gaza Strip	Saeed Seam (Sayid Isa Jabar Tziam) (31).	Hamas commander of Izzedine al Qassam. Allegedly involved in killing two settlers in 2002 and shooting at an Israeli army outpost in 2004.	Shot dead by Israeli sniper in a targeted killing as he stood outside his Gaza home, as he was going to water his garden, in Khan Yunis.	Israel Defense Forces
July 16, 2005	Gaza City	Gaza Strip	Adel Mohammad Haniyya (29); A'asem Marwan Abu Ras (23); Saber Abu Aasi (24); Amjad Anwar Arafat, one reportedly a nephew of Ismail Haniyeh.	Hamas operatives.	Apache helicopter struck a van carrying the men and numerous Qassam rockets in Gaza city. Five civilians, including a child, were wounded in the attack.	Israeli Air Force
September 25, 2005	Gaza City	Gaza Strip	Sheikh Mohammed Khalil (32)	PIJ	Alleged to have been involved in Hatuel family's murder near the Gush Qatif settlement bloc. Killed when his Mercedes was struck by 5 missiles launched from an Israeli aircraft.	Israeli Air Force
October 27, 2005	Jabalia Camp	Gaza Strip	Shadi Mehana/Shadi Muhana (25)	PIJ	Airstrike hitting car with four Palestinian militants north of Gaza City. Three civilians were also killed, including a 15-year-old boy (Rami Asef) and a 60-year-old man. One source stated 14 other Palestinians were wounded.	Israeli Air Force
November 1, 2005	Gaza City	Gaza Strip	Hassan Madhoun (33); Fawzi Abu Kara	Al-Aqsa Martyrs Brigades	Allegedly planning an operation to strike the Eretz Crossing. Killed when his car was hit by an Israeli Apache helicopter missile. According to documents in the Palestine Papers Israel's Shaul Mofaz had proposed to the PA that Fatah execute him.	Israeli Air Force
December 7, 2005	Rafah	Gaza Strip	Mahmoud Arkan (29).	Popular Resistance Committees field operative	Airborne missile strike on a moving car in a residential area. 10 bystanders, including three children, were injured.	Israeli Air Force
December 8, 2005		Gaza Strip	Iyad Nagar Ziyad Qaddas	Al-Aqsa Martyrs Brigades	Missile striking a house. A third militant, and several Palestinians nearby, including a young girl, suffered injuries.	Israeli Air Force
December 14, 2005	Gaza City	Gaza Strip	Four Unidentified	Popular Resistance Committees	Missile strike on a white sedan near the Karni crossing. Israeli sources say the car was packed with explosives. Three PRC members killed, a fourth is thought to have been an al-Aqsa Martyrs Brigades member. One occupant survived, and two bystanders were injured.	Israeli Air Force
January 2, 2006	East of Jabaliya	Gaza Strip	Sayid Abu-Gadian (45); Akram Gadasas (43), third unknown.	PIJ	All three hit by IAF rocket while in a car close to a no-go zone declared by Israel in the northern Gaza Strip. Collateral damage, two bystanders were wounded.	Israeli Air Force
February 5, 2006	Zeitoun	Gaza Strip	Adnan Bustan; Jihad al-Sawafiri	Islamic Jihad in Palestine. Believed to have director of their engineering and manufacturing unit.	Killed when 2 cars fired on by an IAF missile, the second en route to a retaliatory attack for an earlier Israeli helicopter strike that killed three people.	Israeli Air Force
February 6, 2006	North of Jabalia Camp	Gaza Strip	Hassan 'Asfour (25); Rami Hanouna (27)	al-Aqsa Martyrs Brigade|	Hit and killed when their car was struck by three missiles from an Israeli drone. Three bystanders were also wounded.	Israeli Air Force
February 7, 2006	Gaza City	Gaza Strip	Mohammed Abu Shariya; Suheil Al Baqir	Al Aqsa Brigades	Their car was demolished by a missile.	Israeli Air Force
March 6, 2006	Gaza City	Gaza Strip	Munir Mahmed Sukhar (30); Iyad Abu Shalouf	Islamic Jihad field operative.	Collateral damage, 3-8 passers-by wounded, including 17-year-old Ahmed Sousi, and an 8-year-old boy (Ra'ed al-Batch), both of whom later died.	Israeli Air Force
May 20, 2006	Gaza City	Gaza Strip	Mohammed Dahdoh	PIJ	Killed in a car, held responsible for firing crude rockets into southern Israel. Palestinian version stated Muhanned Annen, 5; his mother, Amnah, 25; and Hannan Annen, 45, Muhanned's aunt, were collateral victims. Dahdoh was alone in the car (IDF version).	Israeli Air Force
May 25, 2006	Sidon	Lebanon	Mahmoud al-Majzoub (Abu Hamze), Nidal al-Majzoub	Commander of the Palestinian Islamic Jihad; the brother was a member also.	Critically wounded in car bombing, when he turned on the ignition of his car, parked near the Abu Bakr mosque in Sidon,. He died the next day. Islamic Jihad blamed Israel, though Israel denied it.	An Israeli government spokesman denied knowledge of any Israeli involvement. (alleged)
June 5, 2006	Jabalia Camp	Gaza Strip	Majdi Hamad (25); Imad Assaliya (27)	Popular Resistance Committees	Missile struck their car, targeting Hamad. Three bystanders were injured.	Israeli Air Force
June 8, 2006	Rafah	Gaza Strip	Jamal Abu Samhadana and three others	Founder of the Popular Resistance Committees militant group, a former Fatah and Tanzim member, and number two on Israel's list of wanted terrorists. Had survived 4 assassination attempts.	Killed by Israeli airstrike on a training camp, along with at least three other PRC members.	Israeli Air Force
June 13, 2006	Gaza City	Gaza Strip	Hamoud Wadiya; Shawki Sayklia	Wadiya was a PIJ rocket expert.	Three militants in a van with a Grad rocket were driving down the main street when a missile struck nearby. They fled but were killed by a second missile, as people gathered. The second blast killed 11 Palestinian bystanders, including Ashraf Mughrabi (25) his son, Maher (8), and a relative Hisham (14), 4 ambulance drivers and hospital staff rushing to the incident, and three boys. Thirty-nine people were wounded.	Israeli Air Force
July 4, 2006	Beit Hanoun	Gaza Strip	Isamail Rateb Al-Masri (30)	Izz ad-Din al-Qassam Brigades	Killed by an IAF rocket.	Israeli Air Force
August 9, 2006	Jenin	Gaza Strip	Osama Attili (24); Mohammed Atik (26)	Described by Israel as leaders of PIJ	Killed when (2) helicopter(s) fired missiles into their house. PIJ leader Hussam Jaradat, another target escaped the strike, while his deputy Walid Ubeidi abu al-Kassam, was lightly wounded.	Israeli Air Force
October 12, 2006	'Abasan al-Kabirah neighbourhood	Gaza Strip	'Abd a-Rahman 'Abdallah Muhammad Qdeih, Na'el Fawzi Suliman Qdeih, Salah Rashad Shehdeh Qdeih	Hamas	All three, armed, killed by a helicopter missile after one of the three fired at an IDF tank	Israeli Air Force
October 12, 2006	Khan Yunis	Gaza Strip	Three militants of Kadiah family.	Hamas	Five members of Kadiah family killed, two, Adel Kadiah, 40, and his son, Sohaib, 13, being civilians	Israeli Air Force
October 12, 2006	Gaza City	Gaza Strip	Ashraf Ferwana	Izz ad-Din al-Qassam Brigades	Ashraf targeted in his home but he survived the drone missile strike which demolished his house. His brother Ayman Ferwana and a girl died, and 10 others injured.	Israeli Air Force
October 14, 2006	Jabalia Camp	Gaza Strip	Ahmad Hassan 'Abd al-Fatah Abu al-'Anin (19); Sakher Faiz Muhammad Abu Jabal (19); Rami 'Odeh Salem Abu Rashed (22); Faiz 'Ali Fadel al-'Ur (33); Suliman Hassan Fadel al-'Ur (30); Muhammad Faiz Mustafa Shaqurah (30);	Izz ad-Din al-Qassam Brigades	Five killed while walking armed in the refugee camp, by a helicopter-launched missile.Awad Attatwa (18), not associated with the group, also died.	Israeli Air Force
October 14, 2006		Gaza Strip	Omar Attia Abu Sharia (30); Rajai Ahmed al-Labban (30)	Omar Attia Abu Sharia was the Secretary-General of the Mujahideen Brigades.	Al-Labban died when the car he was in was hit by a missile fired in an airstrike. Omar Abu Sharia was critically injured and died six months later. Two bystanders were wounded.	Israeli Air Force
November 7, 2006	Al-Yamun	West Bank	Salim Yousef Mahmoud Abu Al-Haija (24); Ala'a Jamil Khamaisa (24); Taher Abed Abahra (25); Mahmoud Rajah Abu Hassan (25).	Al-Aqsa Martyrs Brigades	The four militants were shot while sitting near the Al-Yamun bakery (Palestinian version), fled wounded and were killed in a local house. Aiman Suleiman Mahmoud Mustafa (31), a bakery worker came out to see what was happening and was shot dead. Salim Ahmed Awad (27), Ibrahim Mahmoud Nawahda (30), Salim Ahmed Awad (27) and Mohammed Yousef Abu Al-Haija (27) were also shot and taken prisoner.	Israel Defense Forces undercover squad.
November 20, 2006	Gaza City	Gaza Strip	Bassel Sha'aban Ubeid (22); Abdel Qader Habib (26)	Izz ad-Din al-Qassam Brigades	Missile fired at a Mercedes containing both, parked outside the Ubeid family home. Collateral damage, 5 civilians, members of the Amen family, including Hanan Mohammed Amen, aged 3 months and Mo'men Hamdi Amen (2), injured by shrapnel.	Israeli Air Force
January 15, 2007	Isfahan	Iran	Ardeshir Hosseinpour	Iranian nuclear scientist	Gas poisoning.	Mossad (alleged)
May 17, 2007	Gaza City	Gaza Strip	Imad Muhammad Ahmad Shabaneh (33)	Hamas	Killed while travelling in a car hit by an Israeli helicopter missile.	Israeli helicopters
June 1, 2007	Khan Yunis	Gaza Strip	Fawzi (Fadi) Abu Mustafa	PIJ/Al Quds Brigades senior member	Killed by an IAF airforce missile while riding a motor bike.	Israeli Air Force
June 24, 2007	Gaza City	Gaza Strip	Hussein Khalil al-Hur Hossam Khaled Harb, Hussein Harb Peugeot	al-Quds Brigades local leader.	Struck by a missile while driving a Peugeot through Gaza City	Israeli Air Force
October 23, 2007	Gaza City (near)	Gaza Strip	Mubarak al-Hassanat (35)	Popular Resistance Committees head and Director of military affairs in the Hamas Interior Ministry.	Israeli airstrike (IAF) on his car.	Israeli Air Force
December 17, 2007	Gaza City	Gaza Strip	Majed Harazin (Abu Muamen)	PIJ. Senior Commander, West Bank, overseer of rocket operations.	Killed together with two others in his car, reportedly packed with explosives.	Israeli Air Force
December 17, 2007	Gaza City	Gaza Strip	Abdelkarim Dahdouh; Iman Al-Illa; Ahmad Dahdooh, Ammar al-Said; Jihad Zahar; Mohamman Karamsi	PIJ.	Missile strike from an aircraft on a car, combined with IDF undercover unit, on a PIJ cell preparing to launch rockets.	Israeli Air Force
December 18, 2007	Khan Yunis	Gaza Strip	Hani Barhoum; Mohammed A-Sharif	Hamas	Strike on a Hamas security position.	Israeli Air Force
January 13, 2008	Al-Shati Refugee Camp	Gaza Strip	Nidal Amudi; Mahir Mabhuh; third man unidentified	al-Aqsa Martyrs Brigades Senior operative	The three were killed in a car driving through the refugee camp, struck by an IAF missile.	Israeli Air Force
January 17, 2008	Beit Lahiya	Gaza Strip	One unidentified, Raad Abu al-Ful (43) and his wife.	PIJ rocket manufacturer	They were killed by an IAF airstrike which fired missiles at their car.	Israeli Air Force
January 20, 2008	Gaza City	Gaza Strip	Ahmad Abu Sharia	Al-Aqsa Martyrs Brigades Commander	Hit by an IAF missile as he walked in the streets. Two other Palestinians were wounded.	Israeli Air Force
February 4, 2008	Gaza City	Gaza Strip	Abu Said Qarmout	Popular Resistance Committees member	Killed by an IAF missile that struck his car. Three others were wounded, two seriously.	Israeli Air Force
February 12, 2008	Damascus	Syria	Imad Mughniyeh (45)	Senior Hezbollah commander. Responsible for overseeing Hezbollah's security apparatus and planning numerous attacks around world.	Killed in a car bomb.	Mossad/CIA joint operation.
April 14, 2008		Gaza Strip	Ibrahim Abu Olba	DFLP		Israeli Air Force.
April 30, 2008	Near Shabura refugee camp, Rafah	Gaza Strip	Nafez Mansour (40)	Hamas	Killed in an IAF missile strike. Reportedly involved in Gilad Shalit abduction. Collateral damage. Three bystanders, one dying of his wounds. A further bystander and young girl also hurt.	Israeli Air Force/Shin Bet joint operation.
June 17, 2008	al-Qararah, Rafah district	Gaza Strip	Mu'taz Muhammad Jum'ah Dughmosh (27); Musa Fawzi Salman al-'Adini (35); Mahmoud Muhammad Hassan a-Shanadi (25); Nidal Khaled Sa'id a-Sadudi (21)Muhammad 'Amer Muhammad 'Asaliyah (20).	Army of Islam	Killed when their car was struck by an IAf missile. A further two people were wounded.	Israeli Air Force.
August 1, 2008	Tartus	Syria	Muhammad Suleiman	Syrian General. National Security Advisor. Presidential Advisor for Arms Procurement and Strategic Weapons.	Killed by sniper fire to the head and neck. Israel denied responsibility for the killing but was widely suspected of involvement. According to an NSA intercept published by Wikileaks, the NSA defined it as the ‘first known instance of Israel targeting a legitimate government official."	The U.S. Embassy in Damascus reported that Israelis were the 'most obvious suspect (alleged).'
January 1, 2009	Jabalia Camp	Gaza Strip	Nizar Rayan (49)	Top level Senior Hamas leader. Professor of Sharia law, Islamic University of Gaza. Among the first 5 top Hamas decision-makers, and field operative. Advocated suicide bombings inside Israel.	His house destroyed by an IAF bomb. He died along with his 4 wives and 6 of his 14 children. 30 others in the vicinity were wounded. According to Israel, secondary explosions from weapons in the building caused collateral damage. Rayan was not the target, rather, the strike aimed to destroy Hamas' central compound which included several buildings that served as storage sites for weapons. Israel further stated that phone warnings were delivered to the residents.	Israeli Air Force
January 3, 2009	Gaza City	Gaza Strip	Abu Zakaria al-Jamal	Senior Hamas military wing commander of Izz ad-Din al-Qassam Brigades, and leader of Gaza City's rocket-launching squads	Killed in Israeli airstrike.	
January 15, 2009	Jabalia	Gaza Strip	Said Seyam	Hamas Interior Minister	Killed in Israeli airstrike with his brother, his son, and Hamas general security services officer, Salah Abu Shrakh.	Israeli Air Force
January 26, 2009	Bureij Refugee Camp	Gaza Strip	Issa Batran (failed. See 30 July 2010)	Senior military commander of the Hamas military wing Izz ad-Din al-Qassam Brigades	Targeted at his home. The attempt to assassinate him failed, but the shell hit the balcony of their home and killed his wife Manal Sha’rawi, and five of their children: Bilal, Izz Ad-Din, Ihsan, Islam and Eyman. Batran and his child Abdul-Hadi survived.	Israel Defense Forces
March 4, 2009		Gaza Strip	Khaled Shalan	Senior Operative PIJ	Killed in Israeli airstrike, together with 2/3 other militants, targeted after alleged involvement in rocket attacks on the Israeli city of Ashkelon. They jumped from their car but were critically wounded. 5 bystanders were also wounded.	Israeli Air Force

== 2010s ==
Date	Place	Location	Target	Description	Action	Executor
January 11, 2010	Deir al-Balah	Gaza Strip	Awad Abu Nasir	Islamic Jihad Senior Field Commander	Had escaped several assassination attempts. Reportedly involved in attempts to harm Israeli soldiers. Killed by a missile.	Israeli Air Force
January 12, 2010	Tehran	Iran	Massoud Ali-Mohammadi	Iranian physicist	Killed in a car bomb. Majid Jamali Fashi reportedly confessed to an Iranian court he had been recruited by Mossad to carry out the execution, while the US State Department called the allegation "absurd".	Mossad (alleged)
January 19, 2010	Dubai	United Arab Emirates	Mahmoud al-Mabhouh	Hamas senior military commander of Izz ad-Din al-Qassam Brigades, believed to have been involved in smuggling weapons and explosives into Gaza.	Widely reported to have been killed by Israeli intelligence members. Israel stated that there is no proof of its involvement, and neither confirmed nor denied the allegations of a Mossad role. Dubai police report that Israeli agents used Australian, French, British, Irish, and Dutch passports.	Mossad (alleged)
July 30, 2010	Deserted area in the Nuseirat refugee camp	Gaza Strip	Issa Abdul-Hadi al-Batran (40)	Hamas Senior military commander of Izz ad-Din al-Qassam Brigades in central Gaza, who had survived 4 previous attempts on his life (26 Jan.2009). Thought to have been involved in manufacturing rockets.	Killed by a missile in retaliation for the earlier rocket attack on the city of Ashkelon. A further 13 Palestinians were injured in the strike.	Israeli Air Force
November 3, 2010		Gaza Strip	Mohammed Nimnim	Allegedly al-Qaeda affiliated, Army of Islam commander	Car explosion, due to either a bomb planted by Israel or an Israeli airstrike.	Israeli Air Force, with Egyptian intelligence.
November 17, 2010		Gaza Strip	Islam Yassin	al-Qaeda affiliated, Army of Islam commander	Israeli airstrike on his car, killing him, his brother, and injuring four others.	Israeli Air Force
November 29, 2010	Tehran	Iran	Majid Shahriari	Iranian nuclear scientist and physicist	Killed by explosives.	Mossad (suspected)
January 11, 2011		Gaza Strip	Mohammed A-Najar	Islamic Jihad operative.	Suspected of planning attacks against civilians and launching rockets at Israel Attacked by the Israel Airforce while driving his motorcycle in the Gaza Strip.	Israeli Air Force
April 2, 2011			Ismail Lubbad, Abdullah Lubbad, Muhammad al Dayah	Hamas	Allegedly aiming to kidnap Israeli tourists in Sinai over Passover.	.
April 9, 2011		Gaza Strip	Tayseer Abu Snima	Senior Hamas military commander of Izz ad-Din al-Qassam Brigades	Killed along with 2 of his bodyguards by the Israeli air force during a period of escalated rocket fire from Gaza. He was the most senior Hamas commander killed since 2009.	Israeli Air Force
July 23, 2011	Tehran	Iran	Darioush Rezaeinejad	Iranian electrical engineer	Killed by unknown gunmen on a motorcycle. Rezaeinejad was involved in the development of high-voltage switches, which are used in a key component of nuclear warheads. Such switches may also have civilian scientific applications. The German Newspaper Der Spiegel claimed Mossad was behind the operation. He is the third Iranian nuclear scientist killed since 2010.	Mossad (alleged)
August 18, 2011		Gaza Strip	Abu Oud al-Nirab; Khaled Shaath; Imad Hamed	Popular Resistance Committees Commanders	Killed hours after a terrorist attack killed 6 civilians and one soldier in southern Israel. 4 additional members of the group were killed in the strike.	Israeli Air Force, Shin Bet
August 24, 2011			Ismael al-Asmar	PIJ	Allegedly weapons smuggler and militant in Egypt's Sinai, killed just before shooting a Qassam rocket.	
September 6, 2011			Khaled Sahmoud	Popular Resistance Committees	Killed after allegedly firing 5 Qassam into Southern Israel	
October 29, 2011			Ahmed al-Sheikh Khalil	PIJ munitions expert	Killed in retaliation for allegedly launching rockets into Israel earlier that day.	
November 12, 2011	Tehran	Iran	General Hassan Tehrani Moghaddam	Main architect of the Iranian missile system and the father of Iran's deterrent power ballistic missile forces, chief of the "self-sufficiency" unit of the Islamic Revolutionary Guard Corps	Killed along with 17 other members of the Revolutionary Guards known as Bid Kaneh explosion. Those who died are known as the "Shahidan Ghadir". Iranian officials said that the blast at the missile base was an accident, and ruled out any sabotage organized by Israel. AGIR said that the explosion "had taken place in an arms depot when a new kind of munitions was being tested and moved". However, TIME magazine cited an "unnamed Western intelligence source" as saying that Mossad was behind the blast. Israel neither confirmed nor denied its involvement.	Mossad (alleged)
December 9, 2011			Isam Subahi Isamil Batash	Al-Aqsa Martyrs’ Brigades		
January 11, 2012	Tehran	Iran	Mostafa Ahmadi-Roshan	Iranian nuclear scientist	The bomb that killed Ahmadi-Roshan at the Natanz uranium enrichment facility, and another unidentified person was a magnetic one and the same as the ones previously used for the assassination of the scientists, and the "...work of the Zionists [Israelis]," deputy Tehran governor Safarali Baratloo said.	Mossad (alleged)
March 9, 2012	Tel al-Hawa	Gaza Strip	Zuhir al-Qaisi; Mahmud Ahmed Hananni	Secretary-General of the Popular Resistance Committees	According to Israeli intelligence, he was planning an imminent attack in the Sinai.	Israeli Air Force
August 5, 2012	Tel al-Sultan Refugee Camp	Gaza Strip	Nadi Okhal (19); Ahmad Said Ismail (22)	Popular Resistance Committee, Two senior operatives. IDF sources say they were associated with the global jihadist movement.	Killed while riding a motorbike. The other passenger was badly wounded.	
September 20, 2012	Gaza Strip	Gaza Strip	Anis Abu Mahmoud el-Anin (22); Ashraf Mahmoud Salah (38).	Hamas security officers. Salah belonged to the Popular Resistance Committees	Car shelled by aircraft overhead.	Israeli Air Force
October 13, 2012	Jabaliya	Gaza Strip	Hisham Al-Saidni (Abu al-Walid al- Maqdisi) (43/47/53); Ashraf al-Sabah.	Respectively Salafi-jihadist militant leader of al-Tawhid wa al-Jihad and the Mujahedeen Shura Council, and head of Ansar Al-Sunna. Israeli and one Salafi source say they had links with Al-Qaeda.	Killed by a drone-launched rocket while riding a motorbike in company with Jazar. Several civilians, including a 12-year-old boy, were wounded.	Israeli Air Force
October 13, 2012	Khan Yunis	Gaza Strip	Yasser Mohammad al-Atal (23)	Popular Front for the Liberation of Palestine	Rocket strike while he was riding his motorbike. A second man was critically injured.	
October 14, 2012	Gaza City	Gaza Strip	Ezzedine Abu Nasira (23); Ahmad Fatayer (22)	Popular Resistance Committees	Struck by a missile while riding in a tuk-tuk after firing rockets into Israel to avenge deaths resulting from two airstrikes the day before. Two others seriously wounded.	Israeli Air Force
November 14, 2012	Gaza City	Gaza Strip	Ahmed Jaabari	Top-level Commander of Hamas' military wing Izz ad-Din al-Qassam Brigades. Number 2 to Mohammed Deif.	Killed in an airstrike at the start of Operation Pillar of Cloud. Led Hamas' 2007 takeover of the Gaza Strip and, according to Israel, was responsible for most attacks on Israel originating in Gaza from about 2006 to 2012, including the capture of Gilad Shalit.	Israeli Air Force
November 15–19, 2012		Gaza Strip	Hab’s Hassan Us Msamch; Ahmed Abu Jalal; Khaled Shaer; Osama Kadi; Muhammad Kalb; Ramz Harb; Yahiyah Abbayah	Hab’s Hassan Us Msamch, was a senior operative and Hamas Bombmaker. Ahmed Abu Jalal, was a Senior Hamas commander of the Hamas central military wing in Al-Muazi. Khaled Shaer, was a senior operative in the anti-tank operations. Osama Kadi, was a senior operative in anti-tank operations. Muhammad Kalb, was a senior operative in aerial defense operations. Ramz Harb, was an Islamic Jihad senior operative in propaganda in Gaza City. Yahiyah Abbayah was a senior Hamas expert bomb maker and a military commander in central Gaza.	All of them were killed by an IAF airstrike inside their command bunker and weapon storage during Operation Pillar of Defense.	Israeli Air Force
February 12, 2013	Damascus	Syria	Hassan Shateri	Top IRGC General.	Under the pseudonym Hussam Khoshnevis, he was a Head of Iranian IRGC special reconstruction project for Hezbollah infrastructure in southern Lebanon. Israel airstrike killed him during his traveling from Damascus to Beirut.	Israeli Air Force
April 30, 2013	Gaza City	Gaza Strip	Hithem Ziad Ibrahim Masshal (24/25) and three others, one on the bike.	Al Quds Brigades (Israel). Hamas security guard at Al-Shifa Hospital (Hamas version).	Defined by Israel as a Freelance Terror Consultant" and active in different Jihad Salafi terror organisations responsible for two rockets fired towards Eilat on 17 April, he was killed when a rocket hit him on his motorbike. The strike broke a fragile cease-fire agreement.	
December 4, 2013	Beirut	Lebanon	Hassan al-Laqqis	Senior Hezbollah Military Commander. Chief of technology officer and in charge of the Arms Procurement and Strategic Weapons for the group.	Shot and Killed by gunmen in the head with a silenced gun outside his home and car. Israel never took responsibility, but it is widely suspected Mossad committed it.	Mossad
January 22, 2014	Beit Hanoun	Gaza Strip	Ahmad Zaanin; Mahmoud Yousef Zaanin	PFLP; PIJ	The relatives were held responsible for rocket attacks into southern Israel. Only Ahmed was admitted by PIJ to be a member. His cousin and he were killed sitting in a pickup truck parked outside their home.	Israeli Air Force
February 9, 2014	Deir al-Balah	Gaza Strip	Abdullah Kharti	Popular Resistance Committees member.	Regarded by IDF as involved with rocket fire episodes. Hit and critically wounded, with a friend, while riding on a motorcycle.	Israeli Air Force
March 3, 2014	farmland near Beit Hanoun	Gaza Strip	Mus’ab Musa Za’aneen (21); Sharif Nasser (31)	PIJ	(Israeli version): Had just fired homemade rocket landing in a field south of Ashkelon (Palestinian version): It was not known if either were militants. A child and a fourth person were wounded.	Israeli Air Force
June 11, 2014		Gaza Strip	Mohammed Ahmed Alarur/Awar (30/33) of Beit Lahiya; Hamada Hassan, a Beit Lahia resident (25) was critically wounded.	Hamas policeman. Salafist cell leader (Israeli description) Described by IDF sources as a global jihad-affiliated terrorist planning attack against Israel responsible for a rocket salvo on Sderot that interrupted the silence of a Passover holiday.	Alarur was hit by a missile while riding a motorbike. A car nearby was also struck. One report identifies a further victim, his 7-year-old nephew, who was riding in the family care and who died of wounds on June 14, ascribing to the latter a role of 'human shield.'	Israel Air Force, Shin Bet.
June 27, 2014	al-Shati refugee camp	Gaza Strip	Muhammad al-Fasih and Usama al-Hassumi	Two senior Al-Nasser Salah al-Din Brigades operatives.	Struck by two helicopter-launched missiles while driving a black Kia vehicle. Two other people were wounded.	Israeli Air Force
July 5, 2014	Damascus	Syria	Mwafaq Badiyeh	Samir Kuntar's right-hand man and the personal liaison officer between Samir Kuntar and Hezbollah.	He was killed by an explosive device planted on his car by "Mossad agents." While driving on the main road between Quneitra and Damascus. The security source claim the assassination was a response to rockets fired from Syria to Israel in March, that the Syrian army and Hezbollah were responsible for.	Mossad (alleged)
July 8, 2014		Gaza Strip	Muhammad Shaaban	Head of Hamas Special Forces Naval Commando Unit in Gaza	He was killed along with 2 passengers when his car was hit by IAF airstrike followed by attempted infiltration by 5 Hamas Naval Frogmen inside Israel Beach in Gaza border.	Israeli Air Force
July 27, 2014		Gaza Strip	Salah Abu Hassanein; Hafez Mohammad Hamad; Hussein Abd al-Qader Muheisin; Akram Sha’ar; Mahmoud Ziada; Osama al-Haya; Ahmad Sahmoud; Abdallah Allah'ras; Shaaban Dakhdoukh; Mohammed Sinwar (failed attempt)	Salah Abu Hassanein leader and spokesperson of Islamic Jihad in Gaza. Hafez Mohammad Hamad was Top-level Hamas commander for Islamic Jihad in the Beit Hanoun (northern Gaza) area who is directly responsible for the rocket fire on Sderot during escalation leading up to Operation Protective Edge. Hussein Abd al-Qader Muheisin was a Hamas commander for Islamic Jihad in Sheijaya. Akram Sha’ar is a Hamas commander for Islamic Jihad in Khan Younis, who is directly responsible for both rocket fire and terror attacks in Israel. Mahmoud Ziada was a Hamas commander for Islamic Jihad in Jabaliya, responsible for upgrading Hamas rocket arsenal and directing fighting against Israel during Operation Protective Edge. Osama al-Hayya A Senior Hamas leader in Sheijaya, whose son is in Hamas's 'political wing' Khalil al-Hayya. Ahmad Sahmoud was a Top-level Hamas commander in Khan Younis. Abdallah Allah'ras is a senior commander in the Hamas's "military wing", the Al-Qassam Brigades. Shaaban Dakhdoukh was a commander of the forces in Zeitoun, who worked on burying long-range rockets and helped to smuggle weapons for his forces. Mohammed Sinwar a Hamas Military commander, who was involved in the creation of attack tunnels and the launching of rocket fire into Israeli territory and the raid in which Israeli soldier Gilad Shalit was captured.	All of them were killed by IAF airstrike inside of their house along with their comrades and the entire family and also inside their buried Gaza tunnels. It was later discovered that Mohammed Sinwar had survived.	Israeli Air Force
August 3, 2014	Jabalia Camp	Gaza Strip	Ahmad al-Mabhouh	Nephew of slain Hamas commander Mahmoud al-Mabhouh in charge of engineering and destruction officer in Hamas. Among other things, he was responsible for hiding rockets before they were launched at Israel, preparing complex explosive devices and planning armed attacks against Israeli targets.	The IDF and Shin Bet attacked a building in Jabaliya on Saturday night, killing Hamas operative Ahmad al-Mabhouh, the nephew of Mahmoud al-Mabhouh, who was inside.	Israeli Armed Forces, Shin Bet
August 19, 2014	Gaza City	Gaza Strip	Mohammed Deif (failed attempt)	Chief of staff and Supreme Military Commander of Izz ad-Din al-Qassam Brigades. The main architect of Hamas's tunnel system.	Several IAF missiles struck Deif's 6 storey home. His wife Widad (27), 7-month-old son Ali and daughter Sarah (3) were killed in the strike. Three other residents in the building were also killed. According to Fox News, anonymous Israeli intelligence sources claimed that Deif had been killed in the strike. Hamas denied the reports that Deif, who has survived five previous Israeli attempts to assassinate him, had died in the F-16 bombing of his home. In April 2015, Israel confirmed that Deif survived the assassination attempt.	Israeli Air Force
August 21, 2014	Rafah	Gaza Strip	Raed al Atar Rafah Division Senior commander. Mohammed Abu Shmallah Rafah Division Senior commander. Mohammed Barhoum Rafah Division Senior commander.	3 Hamas Senior Military commanders	Struck by a pair of F-16 one-ton bombs guided through a window of the building where they had been located.	Israeli Air Force
January 18, 2015	al-Amal Farms, Quneitra District	Syria	Jihad Mughniyah; Mohammed Ahmed Issa; Abu Ali Reza Al Tabatabai; Mohammed Ali Allah Dadi; Ismail Al Ashhab; Abu Abbas Al Hijazi; Mohammed Ali Hassan Abu Al Hassan; Ghazi Ali Dhawi; Ali Hussein Ibrahim; Along with 6 other Iranian and Hezbollah high-ranking officers	Jihad Mughniyah was a son of a slain Hezbollah supreme military commander Imad Mughniyah. Mohammed Ahmed Issa was Head of Security and Operations. He was also a Senior Hezbollah Military Commander in Syria. Ismail Al Ashhab was a Senior Hezbollah military commander and a top liaison officer with Iran in charge of training Hezbollah forces along the Golan Heights frontier. Abu Ali Reza Al Tabatabai was a Top Iranian IRGC General. Mohammed Ali Allah Dadi was a Top Iranian IRGC General. Abu Abbas Al Hijazi was a field commander and officer of Hezbollah in Syria. Mohammed Ali Hassan Abu Al Hassan was also a field commander and officer of Hezbollah in Syria. Ghazi Ali Dhawi was also a field commander and officer of Hezbollah in Syria. Ali Hussein Ibrahim also a field commander and officer of Hezbollah in Syria.	Struck and hit by Israel Air Force Nimrod/Hellfire missile Apache Helicopter during their reconnaissance and inspection mission along with Israeli–Syrian ceasefire line at the Golan Heights. According to Israel Intelligence Security, they were planning for the massive mega attack, including infiltration, shooting, assassinations, suicide bombing, anti-tank attack, and missile attack with the intention of kill and kidnap Israel soldiers and civilians community along with Quneitra and Galilee border. And also help to establish the missile base inside Quneitra region. Israel neither confirmed nor denied an airstrike.	Israeli Air Force
December 21, 2015	Damascus	Syria	Samir Kuntar, Farhan Issam Shaalan, Mohammed Riza Fahemi, Mir Ahmad Ahmadi, and several other high ranking IRGC commanders and Hezbollah members	Samir Kuntar was a senior Hezbollah commander and also a convicted murderer of an Israeli family in 1979, held in Israeli prison for the next 30 years before released in a prisoner swap in 2008. Mohammed Riza Fahemi and Mir Ahmad Ahmadi were two Iranian senior military officers of the IRGC Intelligence division.	According to the Israeli defence establishment, they were meeting in order to plan the next round of Iran-sponsored terrorist operations against Israel from the Golan Heights areas recently secured by the Syrian military. Two Israeli planes allegedly destroyed a six-story residential building in Jaramana on the outskirts of Damascus. Kuntar's death was confirmed by his brother and Hezbollah. The explosion also killed eight Syrian nationals, among them Hezbollah commanders, and injured a number of other people.	Israeli Air Force
December 15, 2016	Sfax	Tunisia	Mohamed Zouari	Mohamed Zouari was a Chief of Hamas drone program and an Aviation Engineer expert. He also worked on the development and production of Hezbollah drones.	He was shot dead in the head 6 times by using guns equipped with silencer just in front of his house, who located in Sfax 270 km Southeast of Tunis.	Hamas accused Mossad
March 24, 2017	Gaza City	Gaza Strip	Mazen Fuqaha	Mazen Fuqaha was a senior Hamas operative. He was also a senior commander of Izz ad-Din al-Qassam Brigades, Hamas' military wing.	According to Hamas, he was shot dead four times in the head and chest by Israeli Special Forces, who allegedly used silenced weapons provided by Shin Bet Agents and Gaza operatives.	Israeli Special Forces/ Shin Bet
April 21, 2018	Kuala Lumpur	Malaysia	Fadi Mohammad al-Batsh	Palestinian engineer working for Hamas	Shot dead 10 times by two men on a motorcycle.	Mossad is suspected
August 5, 2018	Masyaf	Syria	Aziz Asbar	Syrian scientist responsible for long-range rockets and chemical weapons programs	Killed by car bomb.	Mossad is suspected
May 5, 2019	Gaza City	Gaza Strip	Hamed Ahmed Abed Khudri	Hamas senior member	Killed by airstrike.	Israeli Air Force
November 12, 2019	Gaza City	Gaza Strip	Baha Abu al-Ata	Palestinian Islamic Jihad leader. According to Israel, he was planning a series of attacks against Israeli civilians and soldiers, including preparations for sniper and kidnapping attacks, armed drone attacks, and rocket fire. He was responsible for firing rockets on Israel in the past.	The Israeli Air Force struck his home in Gaza City, killing him and his wife.	Israeli Air Force, Shin Bet

== 2020s ==
Date	Place	Location	Target	Description	Action	Executor
August 7, 2020	Tehran	Iran	Abdullah Ahmed Abdullah	Abdullah Ahmed Abdullah was al-Qaeda's second in command.	Shot along with his daughter by two men riding on a motorcycle	Mossad at the behest of the United States
November 27, 2020	Tehran	Iran	Mohsen Fakhrizadeh	Mohsen Fakhrizadeh was the senior official in the nuclear program of Iran.	Killed with a one-ton self-destructing gun in a truck smuggled into Iran by 20 agents	Mossad (alleged)
May 10, 2021		Gaza Strip	Mohammed Abdullah Fayyad	Hamas commander	Killed by airstrike at the start of Operation Guardian of the Walls	Israeli Air Force
May 12, 2021		Gaza Strip	Bassem Issa, Jumaa Talha, Khazem Khatib, Sami Radwan, Mahmoud Fares, Jamal Zebda, Mojahed Hadidi, Zafer Shahwa	Issa was the Gaza City Brigade commander for al-Qassam. Others were high-ranking senior members in the brigade.	Killed by airstrike during Operation Guardian of the Walls	Israeli Air Force
May 22, 2022	Tehran	Iran	Hassan Sayyad Khodaei	Colonel of Quds Force	Shot dead	Mossad (alleged)
August 5, 2022	Gaza City	Gaza Strip	Tayseer Jabari	Military leader in the Islamic Jihad Movement in Palestine	Airstrike in Operation Breaking Dawn	Israeli Air Force
March 19, 2023	Damascus outskirts	Syria	Ali Ramzi Al-Aswad	Palestinian Islamic Jihad engineer		Israel (alleged)
May 9, 2023	Gaza City	Gaza Strip	Khalil Bahtini; Jihad Ghanem; Tareq Izz ed-Din	Palestinian Islamic Jihad leaders	Killed by airstrike at the start of Operation Shield and Arrow	Israeli Air Force
September 21, 2023	Near Beit Jinn	Syria	Ali Okasha Abu Jarrah; Zaher as-Saadi Abu Alaa	Suspected Islamic Jihad militants	Killed by drone strike	Israel (alleged)
October 14, 2023		Gaza Strip	Ali Al Qadi, Murad Abu Murad	Al Qadi was a Hamas Nukhba unit company commander during the October 7 attacks. Abu Murad was the Head of Hamas' aerial array and an operational commander during the October 7 attacks on Israel.	Killed by drone strike during Operation Swords of Iron	IDF
October 15, 2023		Gaza Strip	Billal Al Kedra	Hamas commander responsible for the Kfar Aza massacre during October 7, 2023 attacks	Killed by airstrike during Operation Swords of Iron	IDF
October 17, 2023	Bureij	Gaza Strip	Ayman Nofal	Nofal was the commander of Hamas' Central Gaza Brigade.	Killed by airstrike during Operation Swords of Iron	Israeli Air Force
October 31, 2023	Jabalia	Gaza Strip	Ibrahim Biari	Hamas commander of Central Jabaliya, responsible for planning the October 7 massacres	Killed by airstrike during Operation Swords of Iron	IDF
November 10, 2023	Gaza City	Gaza Strip	Ahmed Ghandour, Ayman Siam, Farsan Halifa, Rafet Salman, Wael Rajeb	Ghandour was the commander of Hamas' Northern Gaza Brigade. Siam was the Head of the Hamas Rocket Array. Rajeb was Ghandour's deputy. Farsan Halifa was a former released prisoner during 2011 prisoners deal.	Killed by airstrike during Operation Swords of Iron	Israeli Air Force
December 25, 2023	Sayyidah Zaynab	Syria	Razi Mousavi	Commander in the IRGC's Quds Force	Killed by airstrike	Israeli Air Force
January 2, 2024	Dahieh	Lebanon	Saleh al-Arouri	Deputy Chairman of the Political Bureau of Hamas	Killed by drone strike	Israel
January 8, 2024	Majdel Selm	Lebanon	Wissam al-Tawil	Senior commander of Hezbollah's Redwan Force	Killed by airstrike	Israeli Air Force
January 9, 2024	Khirbet Selm	Lebanon	Ali Hussein Barji	Commander of Hezbollah's aerial forces	Killed by airstrike	Israeli Air Force
January 20, 2024	Mezzeh, Damascus	Syria	Sadegh Omidzadeh	Head of the Quds Force intelligence unit in Syria	Killed by airstrike	Israeli Air Force
March 10, 2024	Nuseirat, Deir al-Balah	Gaza Strip	Marwan Issa, Ghazi Abu Tama'a	Issa was the deputy commander of Hamas' military wing, the Izz al-Din al-Qassam Brigades. Abu Tama'a was the Head of Hamas' Administrative and Combat Support Staff.	Killed by airstrike	Israeli Air Force
April 1, 2024	Damascus	Syria	Mohammad Reza Zahedi	Commander of Quds Force in Lebanon and Syria	Killed by airstrike	Israeli Air Force
April 9, 2024	Beit Meri	Lebanon	Mohammad Srour	Hamas financer	Shot dead at his home	Mossad (alleged)
June 3, 2024	Hayyan, Aleppo	Syria	Saeed Abiyar	Commander in the IRGC	Killed by airstrike	Israeli Air Force
June 11, 2024	Jwaya	Lebanon	Taleb Abdullah	Commander of Hezbollah's Nasr unit	Killed by airstrike	Israeli Air Force
June 17, 2024	Selaa	Lebanon	Muhammad Mustafa Ayoub	Commander in the rocket and missile department of Hezbollah's Nasr unit	Killed by airstrike	Israeli Air Force
July 3, 2024	Haouch, southeast of Tyre	Lebanon	Mohammed Nehme Nasser	Commander of Hezbollah's Aziz unit	Killed by airstrike	Israeli Air Force
July 13, 2024	Khan Yunis	Gaza Strip	Mohammed Deif, Rafa Salama	Deif was the commander of Hamas' military wing, the Izz al-Din al-Qassam Brigades. Salama was the commander of Hamas' Khan Yunis Brigade.	Killed by airstrike	Israeli Air Force
July 30, 2024	Haret Hreik, Beirut	Lebanon	Fuad Shukr	Shukr was the Head of Hezbollah's Strategic Unit.	Killed by airstrike	Israeli Air Force
July 31, 2024	Tehran	Iran	Ismail Haniyeh	Political leader of Hamas	Bomb	Israel
September 20, 2024	Haret Hreik, Beirut	Lebanon	Ibrahim Aqil, Ahmed Wahbi, Various others Hezbollah Radwan high-ranking members	Aqil was the head of Hezbollah's Radwan Force. Wahbi was the head of Radwan's training unit.	Killed by airstrike	Israeli Air Force
September 24, 2024	Beirut	Lebanon	Ibrahim Qubaisi	Commander of Hezbollah's Missile and Rocket unit	Killed by airstrike	Israeli Air Force
September 26, 2024	Beirut	Lebanon	Muhammad Hussein Srour	Commander of Hezbollah's Drone unit	Killed by airstrike	Israeli Air Force
September 27, 2024	Beirut	Lebanon	Hassan Nasrallah, Ali Karaki, Abbas Nilforoushan	Nasrallah was the Secretary-General of Hezbollah. Karaki was the commander of the Southern Front of Hezbollah. Nilforoushan was the commander of Quds Force in Lebanon.	Killed by airstrike	Israeli Air Force
September 28, 2024	Beirut	Lebanon	Nabil Qaouk	Deputy head of Hezbollah's executive council.	Killed by airstrike	Israeli Air Force
September 29, 2024	Beirut	Lebanon	Fatah Sharif	Commander of Hamas in Lebanon	Killed by airstrike	Israeli Air Force
October 3, 2024	Beirut	Lebanon	Hashem Safieddine, Ali Hussein Hazima	Safieddine was the head of Hezbollah's Executive Council. Hazima was the commander of Hezbollah's intelligence headquarters.	Killed by airstrike	Israeli Air Force
November 9, 2024	Al-Qusayr	Syria	Salim Ayyash	Senior member of Hezbollah's Unit 151.	Killed by airstrike	Israeli Air Force
November 9, 2024		Syria	Ali Musa Daqduq	Senior Hezbollah commander	Killed by airstrike	Israeli Air Force
November 17, 2024	Beirut	Lebanon	Mohammad Afif	Head of Hezbollah's media relations department	Killed by airstrike	Israeli Air Force
February 18, 2025	Sidon	Lebanon	Muhammad Shaheen	Hamas's Head of operations in Lebanon	Killed by airstrike	Israeli Air Force
March 18, 2025		Gaza Strip	Issam al-Da'alis, Abu Hamza	al-Da'alis was the head of the Government Administrative Committee and de facto Hamas head of government in Gaza. Hamza was the spokesperson of the Al-Quds Brigades.	Killed by airstrike	Israeli Air Force
March 23, 2025		Gaza Strip	Salah al-Bardawil	Senior member of the Hamas Political Bureau	Killed by airstrike	Israeli Air Force
May 13, 2025	Al-Fukhari	Gaza Strip	Mohammed Sinwar, Muhammad Shabana, Mahdi Quara	Sinwar was the leader of Hamas in Gaza Strip and the commander of Hamas' military wing, the Izz al-Din al-Qassam Brigades. Shabana was the commander of Hamas' Rafah Brigade. Quara was the commander of Hamas' South Khan Younis Battalion.	Killed by airstrike	Israeli Air Force
June 7, 2025	Gaza City	Gaza Strip	As'ad Abu Shari'a	As'ad Abu Shari'a was the Secretary-General of the Mujahideen Brigades.	Killed by airstrike	Israeli Air Force
June 13, 2025	Tehran	Iran	Mohammad Bagheri, Hossein Salami, Amir Ali Hajizadeh, Gholam Ali Rashid, Gholamreza Mehrabi, Mehdi Rabbani, Fereydoon Abbasi, Mohammad Mehdi Tehranchi	Bagheri was the Chief of Staff of the Armed Forces of the Islamic Republic of Iran. Salami was the Commander-in-Chief of the Islamic Revolutionary Guard Corps (IRGC). Ali Hajizadeh was the Commander-in-Chief of the Islamic Revolutionary Guard Corps Aerospace Force. Ali Rashid was the Commander-in-Chief of Khatam al-Anbiya Central Headquarters. Mehrabi was the Deputy Head of Intelligence for the Armed Forces General Staff. Rabbani was the Deputy Head of Operations for the Armed Forces General Staff. Abbasi and Mehdi Tehranchi were Top Iranian Nuclear scientists.	Killed by airstrike	Israeli Air Force
June 15, 2025	Tehran	Iran	Mohammad Kazemi, Hassan Mohaghegh	Kazemi was the head of the Intelligence Organization of the Islamic Revolutionary Guard Corps. Mohaghegh was his deputy.	Killed by airstrike	Israeli Air Force
June 17, 2025	Tehran	Iran	Ali Shadmani	Shadmani was the Commander of the Khatam al-Anbiya Central Headquarters.	Killed by airstrike	Israeli Air Force
June 21, 2025	Qom	Iran	Saeed Izadi, Behnam Shahriyari	Izadi was the head of the "Palestine Branch" of the Quds Force. Shahriyari was a senior IRGC official associated with Unit 190.	Killed by airstrike	Israeli Air Force
June 27, 2025	Gaza City	Gaza Strip	Hakham Muhammad Issa al-Issa	Al-Issa was the Head of the Combat Support and Administrative Headquarters of Hamas.	Killed by airstrike	Israeli Air Force
August 28, 2025	Sanaa	Yemen	Ahmed al-Rahawi, Muhammad Abd al-Karim al-Ghamari	Al-Rahawi was the prime minister of the Supreme Political Council. Al-Ghamari was a Houthi general and chief of staff. At least nine other Houthi affiliated ministers and generals were also killed in the attack.	Killed by airstrike	Israeli Air Force
August 30, 2025	Gaza City	Gaza Strip	Abu Obeida	Abu Obeida was the spokesperson of the Al-Qassam Brigades, the military wing of Hamas.	Killed by airstrike	Israeli Air Force
November 23, 2025	Beirut	Lebanon	Haytham Ali Tabatabai	Ali Tabatabai was a senior commander in Hezbollah's Unit 3800 and Radwan Force units. According to IDF reports, he was also Secretary General Naim Qassem's chief of staff.	Killed by airstrike	Israeli Air Force
December 13, 2025	Gaza City	Gaza Strip	Ra'ad Sa'ad	Sa'ad was the Head of the Production Headquarters of Hamas' military wing.	Killed by drone strike	Israeli Air Force
February 20, 2026	Baalbek	Lebanon	Ali Zeid al-Moussawi, Muhammad Ibrahim al-Moussawi, and Hussein Yaghi	Ali al-Moussawi, Muhammad al-Moussawi, and Yaghi were reportedly senior Hezbollah commanders. At least nine other people, including alleged Hamas and Hezbollah operatives, were also killed in IDF airstrikes targeting suspected Hezbollah command centers and 33 more were wounded.	Killed by airstrike	Israeli Air Force
February 28, 2026	Tehran	Iran	Ali Khamenei, Aziz Nasirzadeh, Ali Shamkhani, Mohammad Pakpour, Mohammad Shirazi, Hossein Jabal Amelian, Reza Mozaffari Nia, Saleh Asadi, Abdolrahim Mousavi	Khamenei was the Supreme Leader of Iran from 1989 to 2026. Nasirzadeh was the Minister of Defense. Shamkhani was Khamenei's Advisor for Security Affairs and Secretary of the Defense Council. Pakpour was the Commander-in-Chief of the Islamic Revolutionary Guard Corps. Shirazi was the Chief of Khamenei's Military Bureau. Jabal Amelian was the Chairman of the Organization of Defensive Innovation and Research (SPND). Moazaffari Nia was the former Chairman of the SPND. Asadi was the Head of Intelligence for the Khatam al-Anbiya Central Headquarters. Mousavi was the Chief of Staff of the Iranian Armed Forces.	Killed by airstrike	Israeli Air Force
March 3, 2026	Beirut	Lebanon	Adham Adnan al-Othman	Al-Othman was a senior commander of the Palestinian Islamic Jihad.	Killed by airstrike	Israeli Air Force
March 17, 2026	Tehran	Iran	Ali Larijani, Gholamreza Soleimani, Esmail Ahmadi	Larijani was the Secretary of the Supreme National Security Council. Soleimani was the commander of the Basij. Karishi was Soleimani's deputy. Ahmadi was the Head of the Basij Intelligence Directorate.	Killed by airstrike	Israeli Air Force
March 18, 2026	Tehran	Iran	Esmaeil Khatib	Khatib was the Minister of Intelligence.	Killed by airstrike	Israeli Air Force
March 20, 2026	Tehran	Iran	Ali Mohammad Naini	Naini was the spokesperson of the Islamic Revolutionary Guard Corps.	Killed by airstrike	Israeli Air Force
March 26, 2026	Bandar Abbas	Iran	Alireza Tangsiri, Behnam Rezaei	Tangsiri was the Commander of the IRGC Navy. Rezaei was the Head of the IRGC Navy Intelligence Directorate.	Killed by airstrike	Israeli Air Force
April 1, 2026	Tehran	Iran	Kamal Kharazi	Kharazi was the head of Iran's Strategic Council on Foreign Relations.	Succumbed to wounds from airstrike eight days after an airstrike hit his home.	Israeli Air Force
April 6, 2026	Tehran	Iran	Majid Khademi, Yazdan Mir	Khademi was the Head of Intelligence of the Islamic Revolutionary Guard Corps. Mir was the Commander of Quds Force's Unit 840.	Killed by airstrike	Israeli Air Force
May 15, 2026	Gaza City	Gaza Strip	Izz al-Din al-Haddad	Leader of Hamas in the Gaza Strip and al-Qassam Brigades	Killed by airstrike	Israeli Air Force
May 26, 2026	Gaza City	Gaza Strip	Mohammed Odeh	Leader of Hamas in the Gaza Strip and al-Qassam Brigades	Killed by airstrike	Israeli Air Force
June 12, 2026	Southern Lebanon	Lebanon	Ali Musa Daqduq	Senior Hezbollah commander	Killed by airstrike	Israeli Air Force

== See also ==
- Timeline of the Israeli–Palestinian conflict
- Targeted Killing in International Law (2008)
- List of Mossad operations
