= Ammar Campa-Najjar =

American politician (born 1989)

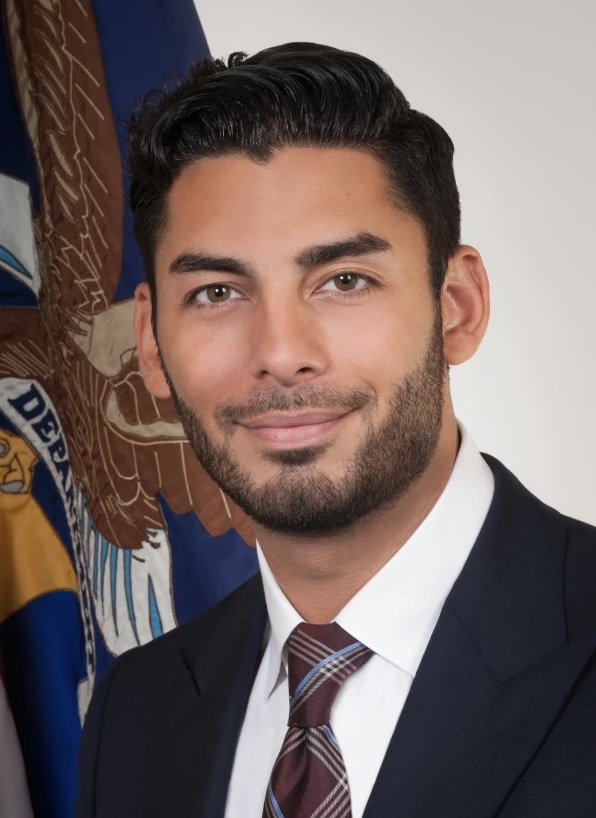
- Official portrait, 2016

Personal details
- Born: February 24, 1989 (age 37) La Mesa, California, U.S.
- Party: Democratic
- Domestic partner: Sara Jacobs
- Relatives: Muhammad Youssef al-Najjar (grandfather)
- Education: Southwestern College (attended); San Diego State University (BA); Georgetown University (atended)

Military service
- Branch/service: United States Navy
- Rank: Lieutenant (junior grade)
- Unit: United States Navy Reserve

Ammar Campa-Najjar (born February 24, 1989) is a Palestinian-Mexican American, U.S. Naval reserve officer, perennial candidate, and former official at the United States Department of Labor in the Obama administration. A member of the Democratic Party, he was the party’s nominee for California’s 50th congressional district in 2018 and 2020, receiving 48.3% of the vote against incumbent Duncan D. Hunter in 2018. He subsequently ran for mayor of Chula Vista in 2022 and for California’s 48th congressional district in 2026.

== Early life and education ==
=== Background and family ===
Campa-Najjar was born in La Mesa, California, and raised in Jamul and Chula Vista, California. His father, Yasser Najjar, is Palestinian, and his mother, Abigail Campa, is Mexican American and a practicing Catholic. Yasser Najjar and his siblings were sent to Cairo by King Hassan II of Morocco after their parents were assassinated. The siblings were separated over the following years with Yasser attending school in England before immigrating to the U.S. and obtaining American citizenship.

Yasser moved to San Diego in 1981 and earned an MBA from San Diego State University. Abigail Campa grew up in Logan Heights and she and Yasser married in the 1980s. In 1994, Yasser traveled to Gaza to work for the newly legitimized Palestinian National Authority and to explore his family's roots. While working for the PNA, he was seen as a moderate who advocated for peace who was an internal critic of Palestinian hardliners in his later years. During his time in Gaza, he attempted to counteract the rising influence of Hamas.

Campa-Najjar's grandfather Muhammad Youssef al-Najjar, also known as "Abu Youssef", co-founded Fatah alongside Yasser Arafat and other exiled Palestinians working in Kuwait in 1965. He was among those targeted in Mossad assassinations following the Munich massacre (Operation Wrath of God). On April 9, 1973, al-Najjar and his wife were killed in their Beirut apartment in an Israeli raid on Lebanon. The attack occurred while their children were at home. The Israeli commando team was led by future prime minister Ehud Barak. Campa-Najjar and Barak met in Washington, D.C., in October 2019.

In February 2018, a book published by Israeli investigative journalist Ronen Bergman, Rise and Kill First, challenged the assumption that those targeted in Operation Wrath of God were behind the Munich massacre. In 2019, in response to the new information, Campa-Najjar withdrew some of the condemnations he had made against his grandfather.

=== Education ===
In 1997, when he was eight, Campa-Najjar and his family moved to the Gaza Strip. In 1998, he attended a Catholic school there. After living in Gaza for four years, he, his mother, and brother moved back to San Diego County. Growing up in post-9/11 America, Campa-Najjar felt he was not "Arab enough in Gaza, Latino enough for the barrio, or American enough in my own country." He wondered if America would accept someone of diverse heritage, saying in the Los Angeles Times: "In 2008, the country said, 'Yes, we can,' and elected this skinny brown guy with a funny name. It really kind of inspired me." When he was 15, Campa-Najjar worked as a janitor to help his single mother pay bills. While in high school, he converted from Islam to Christianity.

Campa-Najjar attended community college at Southwestern College, and earned a dual Bachelor of Arts degree in philosophy and psychology from San Diego State University.

== Career ==
Campa-Najjar worked as a deputy regional field director for the Barack Obama 2012 presidential campaign. During the Obama administration, Campa-Najjar was a White House intern and worked in the Labor Department's Office of Public Affairs for the Employment and Training Administration. As a White House intern, his clerical responsibilities included reading and helping select letters that President Obama would read each day.

He also worked for the United States Hispanic Chamber of Commerce as the communications and marketing director. In this capacity, he prepared to interview then-candidate Donald Trump, who ultimately pulled out of the scheduled event, despite having earlier told Geraldo Rivera in an interview that he would attend. Following the election, NBC News and The San Diego Union-Tribune published his op ed, with a slightly different version published by The Washington Post a few days later, expressing his faith in America despite Trump's election. "Let's not seek comfort in the easy traps of either normalizing or demonizing the decision half of America has made. We must do what is hard, what is necessary and what is right."

In 2017, The Hill published another op ed by Campa-Najjar where he advocated for enhanced vetting and the empowerment of moderate Muslims to help end terrorism. He has advocated for apprenticeship programs that pay people as they learn, for example the Registered Apprenticeship job training initiative, which has bipartisan support.

=== 2018 congressional campaign ===
Campa-Najjar supports solar farms. Campa-Najjar advocated for registering young people to vote, especially those who would be 18 by 2018, because they would be on the receiving end of climate change and increasing levels of indebtedness. His top domestic issue was training Americans to fill job vacancies, and his top international issue was the Israeli–Palestinian conflict, and he opposed Trump's suggested wall with Mexico and travel ban. He cited economic inequality as a top issue facing California, "other than the severe droughts and fires." The district in which he ran for office was about 35% Latino and 15% voters of Middle Eastern descent.

On February 2, 2018, The San Diego Union-Tribune reported that Campa-Najjar had out-raised both the Republican incumbent, Duncan D. Hunter, and his Democratic rival, Josh Butner. On June 5, 2018, Campa-Najjar placed second in the nonpartisan blanket primary, earning a chance to compete against Hunter in November. Campa-Najjar credited support from Our Revolution as an important factor in the primary victory. The Union-Tribune endorsed Campa-Najjar, citing the "lunacy" of incumbent Hunter.

Campa-Najjar lost the 2018 election with 48.3% of the votes to Hunter's 51.7%. During the contest, the Hunter campaign ran an ad in which it claimed that Campa-Najjar had received support from the Council on American–Islamic Relations and the Muslim Brotherhood. PolitiFact found the claim to be false. In October 2018, Duncan L. Hunter, father of Duncan D. Hunter, attacked Campa-Najjar as a security risk.

Campa-Najjar's candidacy attracted international attention due to allegations that his grandfather was involved with the Munich massacre. He acknowledged and denounced the alleged crimes of his grandfather, who died 16 years before he was born. Campa-Najjar's campaign received a notable degree of coverage following the indictment of his opponent for stealing campaign funds for personal use. Hunter's scandal gave his campaign a boost. Campa-Najjar did not blame bigotry for his defeat.

=== 2020 congressional campaign ===
In 2019, Campa-Najjar announced that he would run for the same seat again in 2020. He announced his candidacy on Twitter a day after filing his paperwork with the FEC. He stated that his 2020 campaign would run on the dual platform of economic security and national security. Campa-Najjar said that for the election he would make a more concerted effort to reach out to conservative voters, especially veterans.

Initially characterized as a progressive during his 2018 run, Campa-Najjar walked back his support of Medicare for All and a Green New Deal, calling the latter "impractical". In October 2020, a podcaster posted screenshots purporting to show Campa-Najjar identifying as a blue dog Democrat who intended to become an independent if elected in 2020.

Campa-Najjar appeared in a radio interview with Defend East County founder Justin Haskins. In his interview with KPBS, Campa-Najjar, whose heritage is Latino and Palestinian, said he wanted to sit down with Haskins to address specific issues. They include racist and conspiratorial views of him promulgated by members of Defend East County.

He said in the interview that Judge Amy Coney Barrett “seems very qualified” as a woman, but “if she told him the [Affordable Care Act] was not constitutional, then he said he would not vote to confirm” her to the U.S. Supreme Court. When asked about whether the Clintons and Obamas should be investigated, Campa-Najjar said he would be willing to listen to concerns, noting that nobody is above the law regardless of party. He later told KPBS “the Clintons and Obama shouldn’t go to jail, there wasn’t anything there,” adding that “everything in the past I think is debunked, but if there’s new information let’s look into it … (but) not like a full congressional investigation.” In 2026, President Clinton was asked to testify on the Epstein files.

Under election rules in California, the top two vote-getters in the March 3, 2020, primary, regardless of party affiliation, later faced each other in the general election. Campa-Najjar placed first in the primary, and faced a November runoff election against Republican former Congressman Darrell Issa. Polls show a competitive election in the 50th district, which the Union-Tribune described as "a statistical dead heat".

The newspaper endorsed Campa-Najjar, citing him as "a breath of fresh air," in contrast to long-term congressman Issa "saying derogatory things". Campa-Najjar eventually lost to Issa.

=== 2022 mayoral campaign ===
In 2022, Campa-Najjar unsuccessfully ran for the position of mayor of Chula Vista, California — a city in San Diego County's South Bay region that is outside the congressional district in which he previously claimed residency.

In the June primary election, Campa-Najjar received 22.56% of the vote, enabling him to progress to the general election. His opponent was John McCann, a city councilman. McCann was elected mayor with 52% of the vote to Campa-Najjar's 48%.

=== U.S. Navy Reserve ===
On August 31, 2023, Ammar Campa-Najjar was sworn in as an officer in the United States Navy Reserve. He was sworn in aboard the USS Midway Museum, which he described as surreal because at the same site in 2018, Duncan D. Hunter held a press conference and made racially charged attacks against Campa-Najjar.

=== 2026 congressional campaign ===
In August 2025, Campa-Najjar announced that he would run for the newly proposed redrawn 48th Congressional District if Prop. 50 passed. He was eliminated in the primary election, placing third.

== Personal life ==
Campa-Najjar considers himself to be Latino and Arab American, and is fluent in English, Spanish, and Arabic.

As of June 2026, Campa-Najjar is dating U.S. representative Sara Jacobs. The two met in 2018 when both were running for Congress.
