= Emmanuel Shaked =

Israeli brigadier general (1930–2018)

- עמנואל שקד
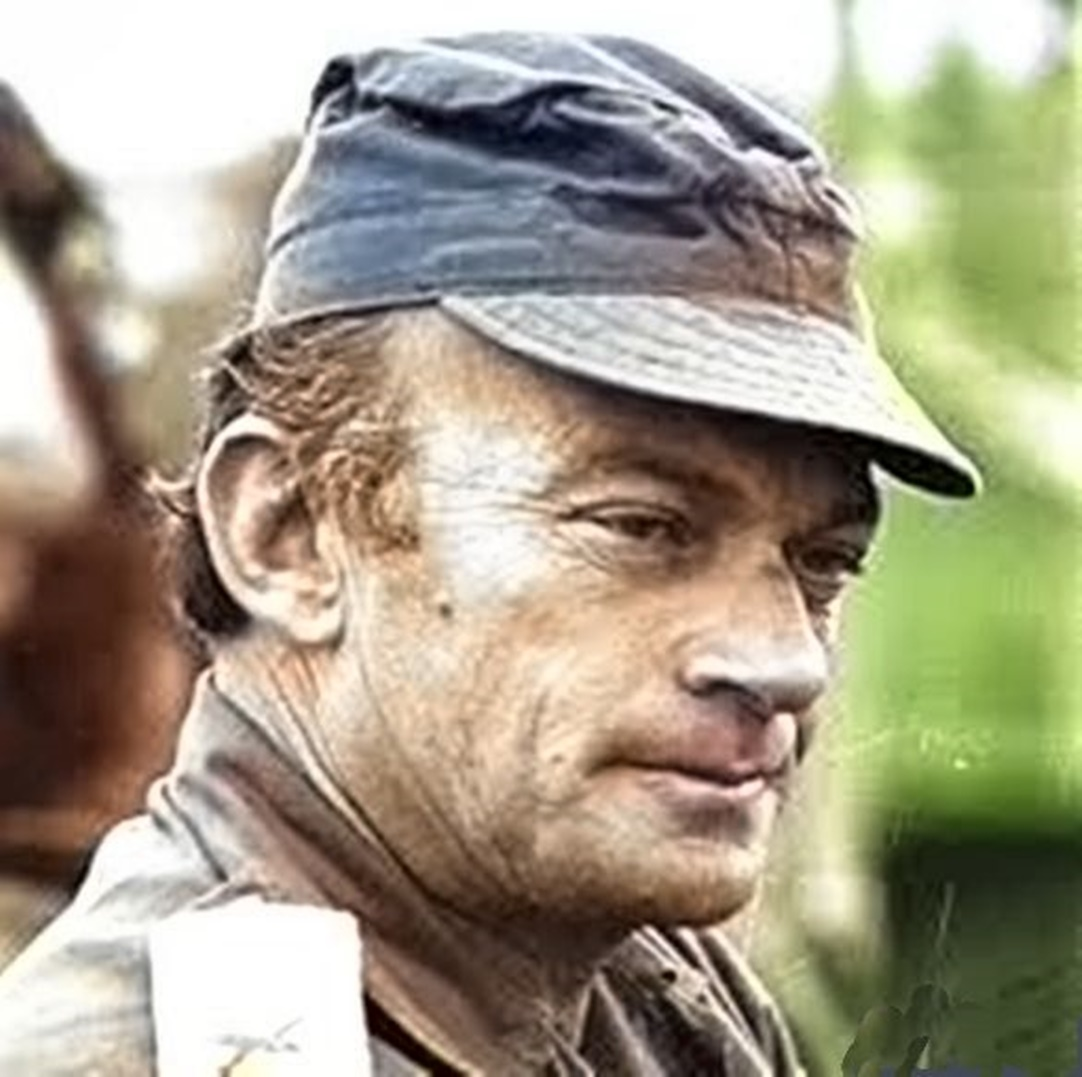
- Born: 1930; Jerusalem, Mandatory Palestine
- Died: September 20, 2018 (aged 87–88)
- Military career
- Allegiance: Israel Defense Forces
- Service years: 1947–74
- Rank: Tat aluf (Brigadier general)
- Nickname: Mano
- Unit: Paratroopers Brigade
- Commands: 890 "Efe" (Echis) paratroop battalion, the Alexandroni Brigade, head of the Paratroopers and Infantry Corps
- Conflicts: 1948 Arab-Israeli War; Suez Crisis; Six-Day War; Yom Kippur War
- Awards: Medal of Distinguished Service

Emmanuel Shaked (Hebrew: עמנואל שקד; August 15, 1930 – September 20, 2018) was an Israeli Brigadier General. He served as commander of the Paratroopers and Infantry Corps.

== Military career ==
Emmanuel Shaked was born and raised in Jerusalem. He joined the Palmach in 1947. He served in the 5th battalion of Harel Brigade and fought in Israel's 1948 Arab-Israeli War. After the war he became an infantry officer after completing Officer Candidate School and served in Givati Brigade.

In 1955, Shaked participated in a deep reconnaissance patrol to obtain intelligence in the Sinai Peninsula. For his part in the operation he was decorated with the Medal of Distinguished Service. Afterwards he transferred to the Paratroopers Brigade and fought in the 1956 Sinai War. Later he served as the commander of 890 "Efe" (Echis) paratroop battalion. During the Six-Day War he commanded Alexandroni Brigade and led the battles in the Golan Heights. In 1969 Shaked was wounded during a skirmish. In 1972 he was appointed head of the Paratroopers and Infantry Corps and commanded Operation Spring of Youth. During the Yom Kippur War Shaked was in charge of special operations on the Syrian and Egyptian fronts, including Operation Gown.

Shaked retired in 1974 with the rank of Brigadier general.
