= United Nations Security Council Resolution 332 =

UN Security Council Resolution 332
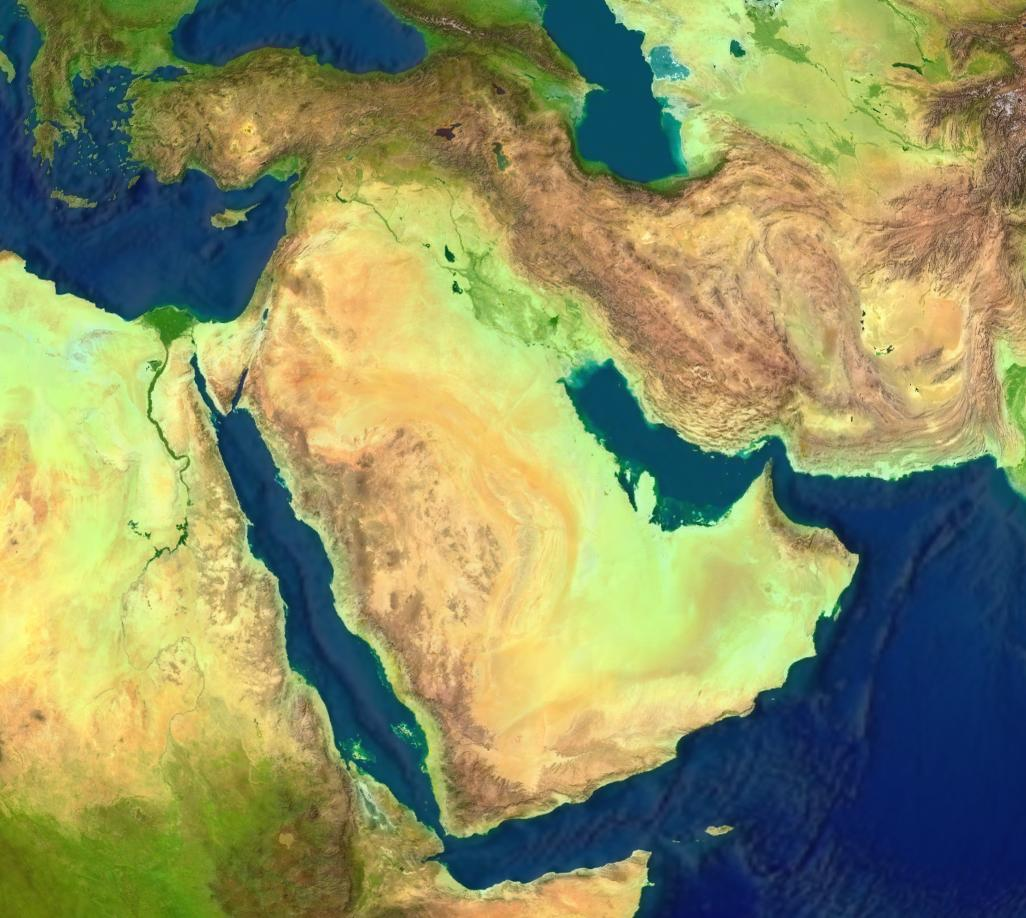
- Date: 21 April 1973
- Meeting no.: 1,711
- Code: S/RES/332 (Document)
- Subject: The situation in the Middle East
- Voting summary: 11 voted for; None voted against; 4 abstained
- Result: Adopted

Security Council composition
- Permanent members: China; France; Soviet Union; United Kingdom; United States
- Non-permanent members: Australia; Austria; Guinea; India; Indonesia; Kenya; Panama; Peru; Sudan; Yugoslavia

United Nations Security Council Resolution 332, adopted on April 21, 1973, after a complaint by the representative from Lebanon, the Council grieved for the tragic loss of civilian life incurred in 1973 Israeli raid on Lebanon in the context of Palestinian insurgency in South Lebanon. The Council condemned Israel for its continued violations of international law and called upon Israel to desist forthwith.

The resolution was adopted by 11 votes to none, with four abstentions from the People's Republic of China, Guinea, the Soviet Union and United States.

== See also ==
- History of Lebanon
- List of United Nations Security Council Resolutions 301 to 400 (1971–1976)
