= Kamal Adwan =

Palestinian politician (1935–1973)

Kamal Abdel Hafiz Adwan

Personal details
- Born: 1935 Barbara, Mandatory Palestine
- Died: 10 April 1973 (aged 37–38) Beirut, Lebanon
- Manner of death: Assassination
- Party: Fateh
- Occupation: Politician, engineer

Kamal Abdel Hafiz Adwan (1935 – 10 April 1973), also spelt Udwan or Edwan, was a Palestinian politician and one of the top leaders in the Palestine Liberation Organization. He was killed during a 1973 Israeli raid in Lebanon.

== Early life and education ==
Kamal Adwan was born in the village of Barbara in Mandatory Palestine. He lived there until the village was taken by Israeli troops during the 1948 Arab–Israeli War. It was recorded that the village was depopulated of its 2,800 Palestinian inhabitants, who became refugees in the Gaza Strip and surrounding Arab countries.

When he was thirteen years old, Adwan settled as a refugee in Gaza where he completed his secondary education. He then worked as a teacher during the early 1950s before moving to Egypt to pursue his secondary education to qualify as a petroleum engineer.

== Political role in the Palestinian National Movement ==
Adwan joined the Palestinian national movement in 1952, when he helped to establish the “justice battalion" in Gaza with Khalil al-Wazir, who was later killed in an Israeli commando operation in 1988.

He then spent his first year as a graduate in Saudi Arabia before he moved to Qatar where he met other Fatah founders including Yasser Arafat. He was one of the founders of Fateh, the Palestinian national movement. He held several political and military positions which included the following:

- Member of the central committee of the Fateh movement,
- Member of the Palestinian national council, the Palestinian Parliament in exile,
- Responsible for the media centre of the Palestine Liberation Organization (PLO)
- Leader of Fateh mechanisms in the West Bank (Western sector)
- Adwan had also played a major role in the foundation of Palestinian universities in the Palestinian territories during the early 1970s.

== Death ==
According to Israeli sources, Adwan was directly involved in the Black September Organization. After obtaining approval from Israeli Prime Minister Golda Meir, Mossad began a covert assassinations campaign. During the operation, several Palestinian militants were killed. Kamal was killed 10 April 1973 in the 1973 Israeli raid on Lebanon.

In an analysis extrapolated from an interview with a Mossad agent involved in Operation Spring of Youth, and contrary to the Israeli claim that the "Verdun operation" came after the kidnapping and killing of Israeli athletes in Munich, Operation Wrath of God was planned months ahead of the Olympic games crisis, and was not a related to a Black September. In his book, The Israeli Secret Services, Ami Pedahzur claims that Adwan seemed to have little or no connection to the Munich hostage crisis, suggesting Mossad's non-involvement in his death. According to Mohammad Odeh Dawood (AKA Abu Dawood), who published his book, From Jerusalem to Munich, Adwan claimed he and two other leaders were masterminds of the Munich hostage crisis.

Kamal was killed in his flat in Beirut, in front of his wife, by Israeli commandos on 10 April 1973 as part of Operation Spring of Youth. Both Kamal Nasser, a poet and writer, and Mohammad Abu-Youssef al Najjar, a lawyer by profession, were killed in the same attack. His killing came nine months after the murders of Ghassan Kanafani, a Palestinian novelist and a member of FPLP, and his 17-year-old niece, Lamees. A 79 year old Italian woman, living in the same building was also killed, as well as several Lebanese policemen. Two of the attackers were killed by Palestinian defenders during their withdrawal. The funeral of Adwan, Nasser and Al Najjar was attended by nearly half a million people most which were Lebanese.

Ehud Barak, who was elected prime minister of Israel in the late nineties, was among the commanders of the raid.

== Legacy ==
Half a million mourners attended the funeral of Kamal Adwan and his comrades in Beirut. Despite over 40 years having elapsed since his death, Adwan is still remembered by Palestinians as a hero who dedicated his life to the Palestinian cause. As a key political figure, his name is frequently mentioned in Palestinian political literature in the period between 1956 and 1973. Kamal Adwan Hospital in Gaza is named after him.

The Jerusalem Post has attributed Fatah attacks in Nahariya and the Carmel Market to Adwan.

== See also ==
- List of Fatah members
