= Kamal Nasser =

Palestinian writer and political leader (1924–1973)

- كمال ناصر
- Born: Kamal Butros Nasser; 1924; Gaza City, Mandatory Palestine
- Died: 10 April 1973 (aged 48–49); Beirut, Lebanon
- Cause of death: Assassination
- Education: Bir Zeit University; American University of Beirut
- Occupations: Political leader, writer, poet

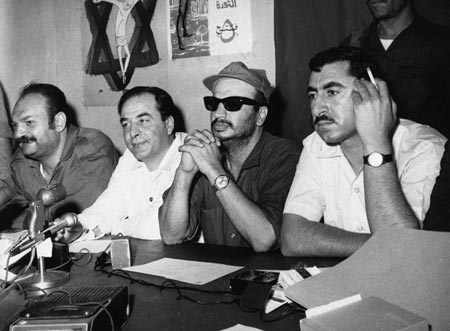
Yassir Arafat (center, in sunglasses) with Democratic Front for the Liberation of Palestine leader, Nayef Hawatmeh (to Arafat's left) and Kamal Nasser (to his right) at press conference in Amman, 1970

Kamal Butros Nasser (Arabic: كمال ناصر; 1924–10 April 1973) was a Palestinian political leader, writer and poet. In the early 1970s, Nasser was a spokesman for the Palestine Liberation Organization.

== Early life and education ==
Nasser was born in Gaza in 1924, and grew up in Birzeit. He hailed from a Christian family; his father was Reverend Butrus Nasir, who was a leader within Palestine's Arab Protestant community from Bir Zeit.

Kamal was educated at Birzeit school (now Bir Zeit University). He then studied political science at the American University of Beirut and graduated in 1945. Later on he worked as a teacher while studying law in Jerusalem, and then taught at Al-Ahlia College in Ramallah.

Nasser's cousin was Hanna Nasser.

== Political life ==
Nasser joined the Ba‘ath in 1952. He was responsible for producing the Al-Ba'ath newspaper from Ramallah and also set up al-Jil al-Jadid (The New Era), a militant newspaper. In 1956 he was elected to Jordanian parliament as Ba‘ath member for the Ramallah district. He did not serve out his term as a result of his expulsion from Parliament during the subsequent martial law period in Jordan. Expelled from the West Bank by Israel in 1967, Nasser became editor of the PLO periodical, Falastin Al Thawra, in 1972 and held the post until his assassination on 10 April 1973. In addition, at that time he became a member of PLO Executive Committee from February 1969 to July 1971, serving as an official with the office of National Guidance. In 1970, he was also spokesman for the committee. In addition, he served as spokesman for the PLO. From 1969 to 1973, Nasser was head of the PLO's media and information efforts.

== Death ==
Nasser was killed in West Beirut on the night of 9 April 1973 by Israeli special forces during an Israeli raid on Lebanon along with Kamal Adwan and Mohammed Yousef Najjar. All three men were included in the Mossad's target list for their alleged participation in the Munich massacre. Their funeral was attended by nearly half a million people most of whom were Lebanese.

== Works ==
Nasser was a published poet and a number of his poems have been translated into English, including The Story and The Last Poem.
