= Issa Batran =

Issa Abdul-Hadi Al-Batran (died 2010) was a leader of Al-Qassam Brigades, the armed wing of Hamas. He was killed by Israeli airstrike on July 30, 2010, at the Nuseirat refugee camp in the central Gaza Strip. The Israeli army claimed that the targets were 'terror infrastructure' in Gaza. Batran's second wife reported that he went knowingly to his death, since he was incapable of overcoming his mourning for the loss of his first wife, Manal Sha’rawi, and their five children, Bilal, Izz Ad-Din, Ihsan, Islam and Eyman. They had been killed on 26 January 2009 by an Israeli shell strike on their balcony in Al-Bureij refugee camp, in an attempt to assassinate him.
