= Muhammad Youssef al-Najjar =

Palestinian Fatah member (1930–1973)

Muhammad Youssef Al-Najjar

Member of the Executive Committee of the Palestine Liberation Organization
- In office 1968–1973

Member of the Palestinian National Congress

Member of the Palestinian parliament in exile

Personal details
- Born: 11 June 1930 Yibna, Mandatory Palestine
- Died: 10 April 1973 (aged 42) Beirut, Lebanon
- Cause of death: Assassination
- Education: Cairo University
- Occupation: Lawyer, Militant, Teacher

Muhammad Youssef Al-Najjar (Arabic: محمد يوسف النجار; 11 June 1930 – 10 April 1973), commonly known as Abu Youssef, was a Palestinian militant who was assassinated by Israeli commandos over alleged involvement in the 1972 Munich massacre.

== Biography ==
Originally from Yibna, he was forced to leave his home village in 1948 by the Israeli forces when he settled with his family in the Rafah Camp, Gaza Strip. He worked as a teacher until 1954 when he went to Egypt to study law at Cairo University. He was qualified from Egypt as a lawyer. In 1965, while working in Kuwait, Abu Youssef founded Fatah along with Yasser Arafat and other exiled Palestinians. Youssef was an early activist, traveling to Qatar to form similar groups, and taking command of Fatah's military wing.

In 1968, Youssef was appointed to the Executive Committee of the Palestine Liberation Organization (PLO). He also was a member of the Palestinian National Congress, and the Palestinian parliament in exile. Two months before his assassination, Youssef was interviewed by the Beirut newspaper L'Orient-Le Jour. In the interview, he explained his conviction to the Palestinian cause, saying that he did not expect his generation of Palestinians to defeat Israel but that future generations would continue fighting: "We plant the seeds, and the others will reap the harvest. Most probably we'll all die, killed because we are confronting a fierce enemy. But the youth will replace us".

Youssef was allegedly involved in planning the 1972 Munich massacre, in which 11 Israeli athletes and coaches were killed by the Black September group. This prompted Israel to launch a campaign of assassinations, with Youssef as a principal target.

== Death ==
In 1973, Israel sent commandos to Beirut, Lebanon to assassinate three high-ranking PLO officials, among them Youssef, in the 1973 Israeli raid on Lebanon. Youssef and his wife were gunned down when Israeli commandos stormed their Beirut apartment. In the raid, Kamal Nasser and Kamal Adwan, other Fatah members, were also killed. Their funeral was attended by nearly half a million people, most whom were Lebanese.

== Legacy ==
The Mohammed Yousef El-Najar Hospital in Rafah was named after him.

== Personal life ==
His grandson, Ammar Campa-Najjar, ran in 2018 as a Democrat to represent California's 50th congressional district in the United States House of Representatives, losing to the incumbent Republican Duncan Hunter. Campa-Najjar ran again in 2020, but lost to former congressman Darrell Issa.

== See also ==
- List of Fatah members
- List of Israeli assassinations
