= 1973 Israeli raid in Lebanon =

Israeli attack on Palestinian forces in Lebanon

Coordinates: 33.9°N 35.53°E

- Part of Mossad assassinations following the Munich massacre (during Palestinian insurgency in South Lebanon)
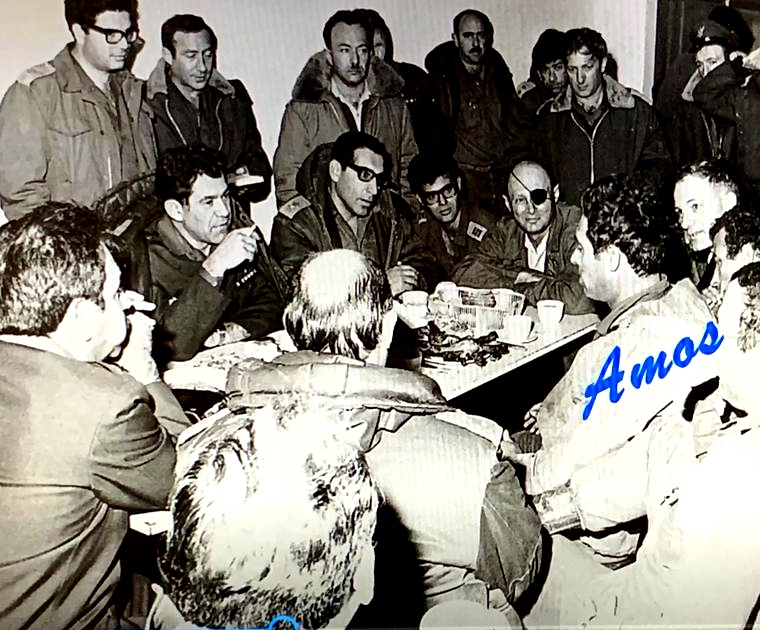
- Israeli commanders debriefing following the operation
Date	April 9–10, 1973
Location	Beirut and Sidon, Lebanon
Result	IDF special forces achieved their objective

Belligerents
Israel	PLO: PFLP

Commanders and leaders
Emmanuel Shaked; Amnon Lipkin-Shahak; Ehud Barak; Shmuel Presburger; Amos Yaron; Shaul Ze'ev	Yasser Arafat; Kamal Adwan †; Muhammad Youssef al-Najjar †

Casualties and losses
2 killed	50+ killed
- 3 Lebanese policemen and 4 civilians killed

On the night of April 9 and early morning of April 10, 1973, Israel Defense Forces special forces units attacked several Palestine Liberation Organization (PLO) targets in Beirut and Sidon, Lebanon. The attack, known as Operation Spring of Youth, is generally considered to have been part of Operation Wrath of God, Israel's retaliation for the Munich massacre at the 1972 Summer Olympics.

The Israeli troops arrived at the Lebanese beaches on speedboats launched from missile boats offshore. Mossad agents awaited the forces on the beaches with cars rented the previous day, and then drove them to their targets and later back to the beaches for extraction.

During the operation, three of the highest-level PLO leaders, surprised at home, were killed, along with other PLO members. Several Lebanese security people and civilian neighbors were also killed, as were two of the Israeli soldiers.

== Background ==
In October 1972, Israel obtained intelligence on the home addresses of three top PLO officials in Beirut:

- Muhammad Youssef al-Najjar (Abu Youssef) – an operations leader in Black September, the group responsible for the 1972 Munich massacre. He was also a PLO veteran, previously head of the Lebanese Fatah branches, head of Fatah internal intelligence organization. His latest duties were head of the PLO's political department and one of Yasser Arafat's deputies (third in line of Fatah's leadership).
- Kamal Adwan – a PLO chief of operations, responsible for armed attacks against Israeli targets.
- Kamal Nasser – PLO spokesman and member of the PLO Executive Committee.

Najjar, Adwan, and Nasser lived near one another in a pair of seven-story buildings on Verdun Street in a fashionable area of West Beirut. These buildings were residential housing for both British and Italian families along with Arab families. One building housed Al-Najjar, and a building across the street housed Adwan and Nasser. Intelligence had also been obtained on the address of Khalil al-Wazir, the PLO's second-in-command, but he lived further away from the three others. In addition to information about their residences, high-grade intelligence had also been amassed on other PLO targets in Lebanon such as weapons workshops, command posts, and offices. It was decided to assassinate Najjar, Adwan, and Nasser.

The Mossad subsequently deployed Yael Man, a female agent codenamed Nielsen to Beirut in January 1973 to amass further intelligence so that an assassination operation could be planned. She arrived in Lebanon under the cover story that she was there to conduct research for a television series on the life of Lady Hester Stanhope which she was planning on writing. She rented an apartment in a building exactly opposite the two buildings where Najjar, Adwan, and Nasser lived and clandestinely photographed potential landing areas and the target buildings, also meticulously recording the routines of those in the buildings.

Although sufficient intelligence had been amassed to enable an assassination, the Mossad still faced a dilemma in how to carry them out. As the buildings were in a densely populated areas, the use of explosives was ruled out due to a high likelihood of killing civilians, and the assassinations would have to be close-contact. The Mossad agents already in Lebanon were there for deep-cover surveillance and did not have sufficient training, while combatants from the Mossad's kidon unit who could carry out such assassinations lacked convincing cover stories to infiltrate Lebanon and remain there long enough to carry out the mission. It was also deemed near-impossible for a kidon team to be able to quickly escape after conducting such an operation. As a result, the conclusion was reached that the Mossad could not carry out such a mission on its own and it would have to be a military operation, as only the Israel Defense Forces had the necessary forces for such an operation.

The IDF's initial proposal was for about a hundred soldiers to take over the buildings, herd the residents into the street, and conduct a lineup to identify and kill the three targets. However, IDF Chief of Staff David Elazar had doubts about the plan and asked Ehud Barak, the commander of the Sayeret Matkal special forces unit, to come up with a better one. After examining the intelligence, Barak concluded that the IDF's proposal would take too much time and get the raiders involved in exchanges of fire. He decided that a small raiding party should instead enter the city, conduct the assassinations within a matter of minutes, and escape before any response could be mounted.

The final plan was to land soldiers from navy ships on the Lebanese coast who would infiltrate into Beirut disguised as tourists, where they would be picked up by Mossad agents waiting for them with rented cars and driven to their targets. Some of the commandos were to be disguised as women (Barak was disguised as a brunette woman). This was at the suggestion of Elazar, who was concerned that a group of men moving through Beirut at midnight would raise suspicion. In addition to the assassination mission, four PLO facilities were to be attacked. To maintain the element of surprise, the apartments of the three targets would have to be breached before the other attacks could begin. Before the mission, the forces trained using similar apartments in northern Tel Aviv. They also practiced cross-dressing and walking around disguised as lovers. Meanwhile, Mossad agents in Beirut gathered additional intelligence for the raid. Nielsen selected the private beach of the Sands Hotel as the landing site since access was restricted to guests and it was close to the hotel's parking lot, where the commandos could be picked up by Mossad agents. Brigadier General Emmanuel Shaked, the commander of the IDF's infantry and paratrooper forces, was placed in overall command of the operation.

On April 6, 1973, six Mossad operatives arrived in Beirut on counterfeit British, German, and Belgian passports. They checked into the Sands Hotel, rented cars, and parked them in the hotel's parking lot.

== The operation ==
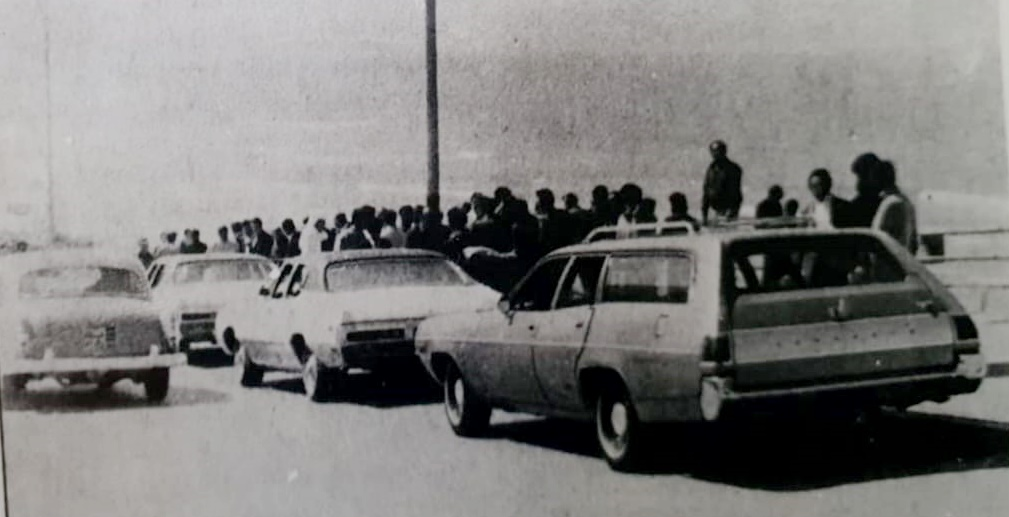
Vehicles used by the raiding force abandoned by the Beirut shore after the raid

On April 9, 1973, eight Israeli Navy missile boats departed from Haifa naval base, carrying 75 soldiers - 21 Sayeret Matkal commandos, 34 Shayetet 13 naval commandos, and 20 soldiers of the Paratroopers Brigade's Sayeret Tzanhanim unit - and 19 Zodiac speedboats on board. They dropped anchor twelve miles off the coast of Beirut. Meanwhile, one of the Mossad operatives at the Sands Hotel met with Nielsen, who confirmed that the three targets were at home, and this information was radioed to the attacking force, after which the operation began. The patrol boats of the Squadron 916 were also kept as a reserve.

The Zodiac boats carrying the raiding party set out for the shore. To avoid being heard, they turned the motors off when they were a few hundred meters from land and rowed the rest of the way in. The Shayetet 13 commandos carried raiders disguised as tourists onto dry land so that they wouldn't get wet and ruin their disguises, particularly those dressed as women, as they were wearing heavy makeup. They met the Mossad agents waiting in the parking lot with the vehicles, and were driven to their targets. The soldiers responsible for carrying out the assassinations were dropped off two blocks from their targets and walked the rest of the way, posing as couples.

At the apartment buildings the force split up, with three designated teams entering the buildings while a backup team led by Barak remained outside and stood guard to repel PLO reinforcements or Lebanese Internal Security Forces (ISF) Gendarmerie units. The backup team also included a doctor. The commandos entered the buildings unchallenged, as the PLO guards they had been expecting in the lobbies were asleep in their cars. Reaching the apartments of their targets, they placed explosive charges at their doors and then signalled to Barak with three clicks on their radio. After receiving the signal from all three teams, Barak replied with five clicks, which was the order to execute. He also signalled to Shaked that the other planned attacks could begin.

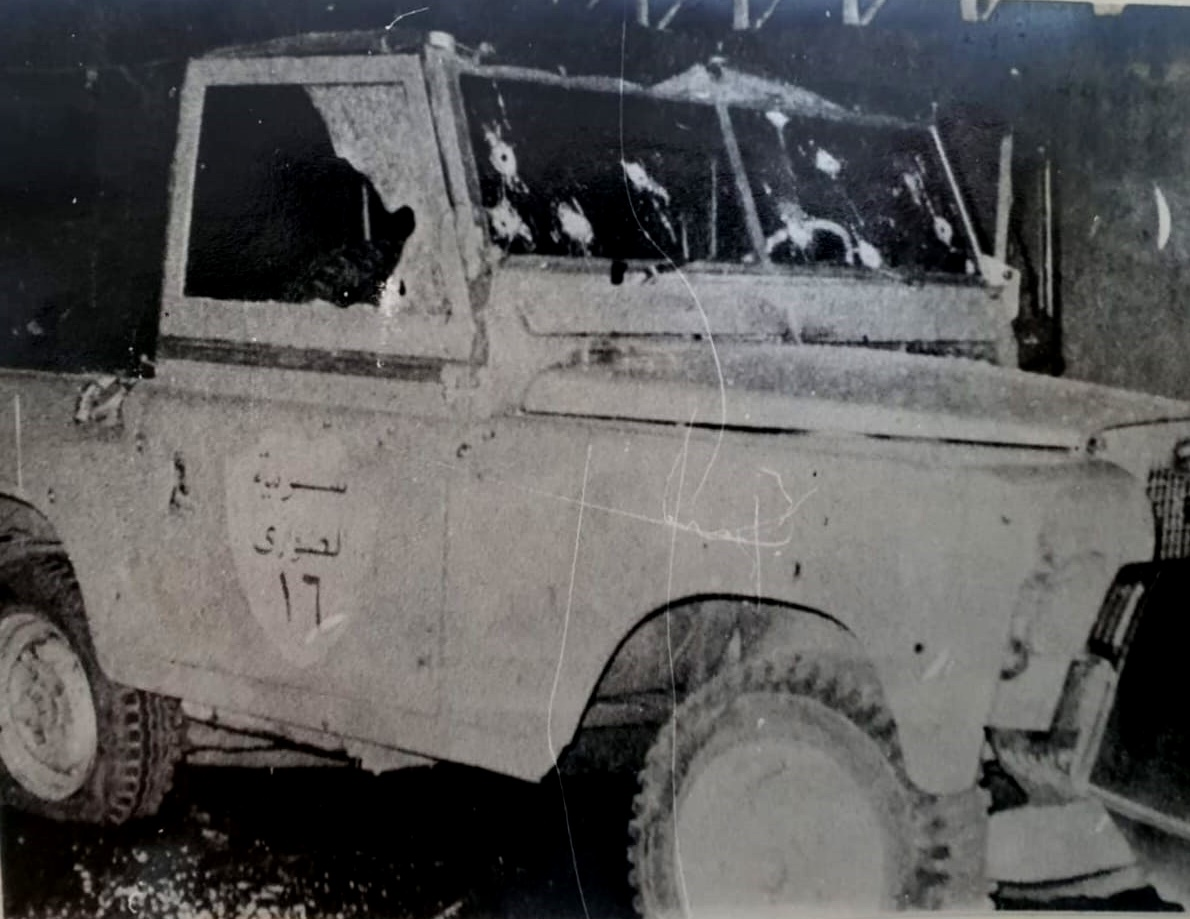
A Lebanese security forces vehicle damaged in the raid

The explosive charges blew the apartment doors open, after which the commandos gunned down their targets. Muhammad Youssef al-Najjar came out of his bedroom and shut himself in another room, along with his wife. Muki Betser and another one of the raiders then sprayed automatic fire into the room through the door, killing Najjar and his wife. After kicking in the door and finding Najjar's body and his fatally injured wife, Betser decided not to pick up his documents as planned as he had heard shooting outside, and ordered his soldiers to follow him into the street. Kamal Nasser, who had been sitting at his desk, took cover and fired at the raiders with his pistol, hitting one of them in the leg before being killed. According to Palestinian reports, Nasser, a Christian, was shot in front of his family with his bullet wounds tracing the sign of the cross. Kamal Adwan stepped out of his door with an AK-47 and was killed. The raiders took as many documents with them as they could and fled the scene. During the raid, an elderly Italian woman responding to the commotion was killed.

At the same time, the backup team became engaged in a firefight. A PLO guard who had fallen asleep woke up and emerged from his car with a pistol drawn. Barak and Amiram Levin shot him, but one of their bullets hit the car and set off its horn, waking up residents of the neighborhood who called the police. Security forces from a nearby police station responded rapidly and the Israelis were soon engaged in a firefight with a few dozen Lebanese Internal Security Forces (ISF) gendarmes. The backup team was joined by the raiding parties in the engagement. The Israeli commandos held off the Lebanese security forces with automatic fire and Betser tossed a grenade at a jeep carrying Lebanese reinforcements, killing three of its four occupants. The Mossad agents arrived with the rented cars, and the commandos piled in and made their getaway, leaving behind spikes in the road to puncture the tires of pursuing police cars. While driving to the beach, they encountered a Lebanese Army armoured personnel carrier (APC) as it scanned the shore. They were not confronted and continued on to the beach, where the commandos and drivers abandoned the cars and returned to the missile boats in Zodiacs.

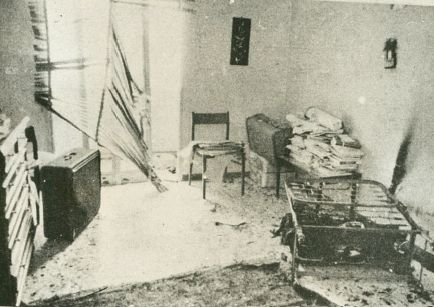
Kamal Adwan's apartment after the raid

At the same time, a force consisting mainly of Sayeret Tzanhanim paratroopers raided a multi-story building that housed militants of the Popular Front for the Liberation of Palestine (PFLP). The team was disguised as civilians and led by Amnon Lipkin-Shahak. They killed the guards at the entrance but took fire from a guard post they had not spotted and a firefight erupted. Three of the soldiers were severely wounded. Two of them were evacuated to one of the waiting cars. The third was being carried to the cars by a Shayetet 13 commando when a PFLP fighter, apparently believing that the wounded man was a Palestinian, tried to rescue him and grappled with the naval commando before fleeing. He was then put in another car. Although the force had a doctor on hand, the Mossad agent at the wheel of the car carrying two of the wounded panicked due to the gunfire and drove to the beach. Despite the fact that they had been discovered and were engaged in a firefight, Shahak ordered that the mission proceed. The soldiers successfully attached explosives to the building and withdrew. Upon arriving at the cars, they found only two of them, with the one carrying two of the wounded having vanished. After searches failed to locate the vehicle, Shahak, despite not wanting to withdraw without accounting for the two wounded men, ordered the men to evacuate in the two remaining cars. As they withdrew, the explosive charges detonated and the building collapsed. At the beach, they found the missing car, with one of the wounded men dead from blood loss. They returned to the missile boats, where another of the wounded died during surgery.

Two secondary forces attacked the Fatah headquarters for Gaza operations and a Fatah workshop in south Beirut. A third force of Shayetet 13 naval commandos landed in north Beirut and destroyed a small Fatah explosives workshop, while another paratroop unit raided and destroyed the PLO's main garage, located just south of Sidon.

== Aftermath ==
The Israeli operation sharply polarized public opinion in Lebanon. The Muslim Prime Minister Saeb Salam tendered to the resignation of the cabinet. 250,000 people, 10 per cent of the Lebanese population, turned out for the funeral in Beirut of the slain PLO leaders and further tens of thousands attended demonstrations in other parts of the country. The opponents of the armed Palestinian presence, chiefly the army command and President Frangieh, tried but failed to use the opportunity to restrict Palestinian freedom of movement. Two weeks of fighting between the army and Palestinian groups ended in stalemate. In the end, Frangieh had to admit that the Lebanese army was unable to defend the Palestinian refugee camps and he therefore reluctantly allowed the PLO to bring in heavier weapons and build fortifications.

Documents seized from Kamal Adwan's apartment provided a wealth of intelligence on PLO operations in the occupied territories and enabled the Israeli authorities to carry out a series of arrests which severely damaged the Fatah network there.

== Popular culture ==
- Operation Spring of Youth was featured in the 2005 Steven Spielberg film Munich.
- The Israeli children's book The Time Tunnel – Operation Spring of Youth (2005) by Galila Ron-Feder Amit, number 32 in the Time Tunnel series, is based on this operation.

== See also ==
- Israeli casualties of war
- United Nations Security Council Resolution 332
- Palestinian casualties of war
