= Atef Bseiso =

Palestinian intelligence officer (1948–1992)

- عاطف بسيسو
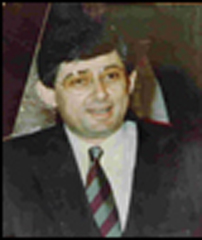
- Atef Bseiso
- Born: 23 August 1948
- Died: 8 June 1992 (aged 43); Paris, France
- Occupation: Palestine Liberation Organization head of intelligence

Atef Bseiso (Arabic: عاطف بسيسو, 23 August 1948 – 8 June 1992) was the Palestine Liberation Organization's (PLO) liaison officer with foreign intelligence agencies. He was assassinated in Paris in 1992. Several theories exist regarding the reason for his murder. According to one, alleging he played a role in the 1972 Munich Olympics massacre, his execution was part of a Mossad assassination campaign. Others argue it was an Israeli operation aiming to disrupt relations of the PLO with Western intelligence agencies. The PLO denied Bseiso had any connection to the Munich operation.

His death was seen at the time as damaging PLO attempts to strengthen their credentials by sharing intelligence information with Western countries on terrorist operations hostile to Western interests. Several assassinations of PLO intelligence officials are thought to reflect the desire of that organization to discourage PLO members from developing close links with Western intelligence agencies. (Note: "Mossad realized he was one of the main links between the PLO and intelligence agencies in the West, including those of Germany, France, and America, and top Israeli intelligence officials believed that these ties were one more step toward the West's bestowment of full international diplomatic legitimization upon Arafat and the PLO, and the isolation of Israel...Their protests to the Western states fell on deaf ears, so Israel decided to convey its displeasure in a more direct manner.")

== Background ==
Bseiso hailed from one of the largest and most respected Palestinian clans in the Gaza Strip. He became a member of the Black September organization, a group from which the perpetrators behind the Munich Massacre were eventually recruited. From that time, his name was on a "red list" of people to be targeted for assassination, signed by Israeli Prime Minister Golda Meir and confirmed by Yitzhak Shamir, though Nahum Admoni gave the green light in 1988 for removing his name from Israel's hit list. Robert Baer, a CIA field officer who sought via French contacts to handle Bseiso, remained agnostic on the question. (Note: "Israelis privately accused him. I never got a good look at the Munich evidence, which left me basically agnostic on Atef's role. Not to mention that the Israelis aren't exactly infallible when it comes to the Palestinians.") A Lebanese friend present at the assassination dismissed the claim saying Bseiso was far too young at the time of the Munich operation to have been involved in it. (Note: "I asked Claude about Munich.'He was a kid,' he said. 'He had no idea what was going on. It's bullshit'.")

By 1992 Bseiso was considered a rising star in the PLO ranks. He had been appointed the PLO's liaison man with the CIA, but also had contacts within German intelligence and France's Direction de la surveillance du territoire. Just before his trip to Europe, he had visited Havana and Spain, and his travel arrangements, down to his final visit to Paris, were all organized by Ahmad Yassin. In June of that year he left Tunis, where he had been based for the last decade, for a series of appointments with these agencies in Europe. The primary purpose of Bseiso's visit to Paris was to discuss with French police arrangements for the security of PLO members in that country.

== Assassination ==
After contacts with the German intelligence agency, Bundesamt für Verfassungsschutz (BfV), in Bonn in early June, Bseiso purchased a Jeep Renegade, which he had arranged to be imported from the United States to Germany, and drove it to Paris where he booked at the last moment into the Hôtel Méridien Montparnasse, which caused the Caesarea assassination squad tailing him to make some rapid retouches to their plan. Bseiso realized he was being tracked after noticing a suspicious figure in his hotel lobby and requested protection from the French, who replied that none was available until the following morning. He had arranged an appointment to make a courtesy visit on his French contacts in the counter-espionage department for 10 am the following day.

Bseiso intended, on finishing business in Paris, to drive down to Marseilles, and ferry back to Tunis, and surprise his wife Dima and their three children with the new car.

An Israeli surveillance team had been tracking Bseiso ever since his arrival in Berlin three days earlier. On the evening of 8 June 1992, Bseiso was dining out with two Lebanese friends: a bodyguard and a woman at one of the Hippopotamus chain of restaurants. After the meal, the suspicion that the hotel lobby figure was tailing him was dismissed, and Bseiso was driven back to the hotel at Rue du Commandant-René-Mouchotte, and on getting out was approached by two men, who looked like skinheads, and who were nicknamed "Tom" and "Frank", the former wielding a .22 Beretta furnished with a cloth sachet brass catcher to collect spent casings. As Bseiso bent down to pull the front seat forward and enable one of his friends to shift from the back passenger seat, one of the two pushed him against the car bonnet, while the other shot Bseiso two or three times in the head. Thereupon they slipped away walking quickly towards the getaway vehicle awaiting them at Rue Vandamme. Within two hours all members of the team had left the country. A spokesman for the Prime Minister Shamir's office dismissed claims Mossad was involved as "totally and completely ridiculous". Bseiso was the 6th (or 7th) PLO leader to be assassinated in France, the others being Mahmoud Hamshari, Basil Al Kubaisi, Ezzedine Kalak, Zouheir Mohsen and Fadl Dani. The operation to kill Bseiso was directed by Shabtai Shavit from a safe house in the 11th Arrondissement of Paris.

== Aftermath ==
According to a Mossad section chief in Brussels, who was shocked at news of Bseiso's killing, Bseiso had been removed from the list in 1988 with the approval of Nahum Admoni. It had apparently been put back on the personal initiative of Shabtai Shavit, who then directed the operation. Shavit was convinced Bseiso was implicated in the Munich attack, and Aaron J. Klein's account endorses this theory, as does John Macintyre in reviewing Klein, though he adds that many Palestinians assassinated for involvement in the Munich massacre were not directly linked to it. (Note: "Klein, who interviewed dozens of Mossad agents, estimates that the majority killed were not directly linked to the massacre. Many who were had taken refuge in the communist bloc where even Mossad found it difficult to reach them. But Klein says the agency, which believed it was having a powerful deterrent effect, was not always fussy about its targets. 'Our blood was boiling,' Klein quotes one intelligence source as saying. 'When there was information implicating someone, we didn't inspect it with a magnifying glass.'.")

The CIA agent Robert Baer, one of the officials Bseiso was to meet the following day, stated that one primary reason for Mossad's killing of Bseiso was to block the growing international recognition of the PLO arising in part from the organization's links with key Western intelligence agencies. The operation to assassinate him relied on key details concerning Bseiso's movements supplied to a Mossad agent, posing as an Iranian government official, by Adnan Yassin in exchange for money. Other sources state he was turned by the Tzomet ("Crossroads") unit while in France where his wife was undergoing treatment for cancer. Israeli sources suggest Yassin was greedy for money: the French investigators concluded that Yassin passed on information in exchange for assistance in paying his wife's medical expenses for cancer treatment in a Paris hospital.

French intelligence, while privately fingering Mossad, (Note: Immédiatement prévenue, la DST n'a guère de doute sur l'implication du Mossad. "Pour nous, c'était aussi un signal à l'égard de la France, témoigne sous couvert de l'anonymat un ancien du service. Les Israéliens avaient le loisir de supprimer Bseiso au cours des mois précédents, lors de ses déplacements en Espagne ou à la Havane. Ils ont choisi de le faire à Paris.") at the time announced publicly that the responsibility for his death was to be traced to the Abu Nidal Organization, a claim made by an anonymous telephone caller stating he represented Abu Nidal, but which was quickly denied by that group. An anonymous caller phoned the bureau of the United Press International, claiming the murder was the handiwork of the Kahane Chai organization, and executed to revenge the killing of Rabbi Meir Kahane. The PLO pointed the finger at Mossad, which is now known to have organized his killing. At the time, Ehud Gol, spokesman for the Israeli Prime Minister Yitzhak Shamir, stated that claims of Israel's responsibility were "completely ridiculous" and did not merit a reply. Some Israeli authorities suggested it was the work of a rival Palestinian faction. General Uri Sagi, head of Israel's military intelligence claimed that Bseiso had been involved in both the 1972 Munich Olympics massacre, a failed attempt on the life of the Jordanian ambassador to London, and an abortive attack on an El Al plane in 1978, adding he did not know who was responsible.

The CIA was furious with Israel for killing one of its key contacts within the PLO. The French were outraged that Mossad had performed a targeted assassination on French soil, and began to crack down on Mossad infrastructure and operations in that country. From Mossad's perspective, the information provided by Yassin allowed them to hamper PLO operations against Israel: they managed to hack into PLO financial accounts and transfer funds from one account to another, sowing suspicions that members were stealing funds, and distracting their external operations as PLO officials tried to root out apparent moles and traitors within their organization. Mossad had been out of the loop of the secret negotiations between the Israeli government and the PLO that lead to the Oslo Accords. They had learnt of these talks via a microphone planted in the offices of Mahmoud Abbas, and when the government learned of the intercepts, according to one theory, they tipped off the PLO which then dismantled the listening devices and arrested Yassin as a traitor. Another version states, to the contrary, that it was the French who tipped off the PLO. The listening devices had been planted by Ahmad Yassin, one in an orthopedic airchair Yassin's son had had shipped from Marseilles. Given the peace talks, Yassin, the deputy to the PLO Ambassador in Tunisia Hakam Balawi, was arrested by the Tunisian authorities on 25 October 1993. He was not executed but sentenced to 15 years in prison. According to Aaron J. Klein, he was never heard of again.

== Legal follow-ups ==
The Palestinian National Authority appealed the decision made by a Paris court on 9 December 2014 dismissing the case on the base of a lack of evidence. The French court of Appeal confirmed the decision on 8 October 2015. A lawyer for the plaintiffs stated that the verdict was "a simple admission that a political assassination can remain unpunished, something which can only add to the sense of resentment and injustice experienced by Palestinians." (Note: "on a tout simplement admis qu'un assassinat politique puisse rester impuni, ce qui ne peut qu'ajouter au ressentiment et au sentiment d'injustice vécu par les Palestiniens.")

== Wreath-laying ==
Labour leader Jeremy Corbyn was present in 2014 when wreaths were laid at the graves of several Palestinian victims of violence, and photographed holding a wreath at Bseiso's gravesite. One of the graves was that of Bseiso. Four years later, his participation caused a media furore when it was cited as evidence for suspicions Corbyn was friendly with terrorists, with claims being made by Benjamin Netanyahu and others that Bseiso had been involved in the Munich Massacre.

== Personal life ==
Bseiso was married and had three children.

== Sources ==
- Andraos, Zuhair (25 January 2014). "Double agent Adnan Yasin avoided sentence under Israeli pressure". Middle East Monitor.
- Baer, Robert (2014). The Perfect Kill: 21 Laws for Assassins. Hachette UK. ISBN 978-0-297-86817-0.
- Bergman, Ronen (2018). Rise and Kill First: The Secret History of Israel's Targeted Assassinations. Hachette UK. ISBN 978-1-473-69472-9.
- Corbyn, Jeremy (5 October 2014). "Palestine United". Morning Star.
- Evans, Helen (8 June 1992). "Senior PLO security official killed in Paris". United Press International.
- Hugeux, Vincent (8 October 2015). "Fin de l'enquête sur l'assassinat d'un cadre de l'OLP à Paris". L’Express.
- Ibrahim, Youssef M. (14 June 1992). "Intriguing Theories; a Murder in Paris Thins P.L.O. Leadership". The New York Times.
- Klein, Aaron J. (2007). Striking Back: The 1972 Munich Olympics Massacre and Israel's Deadly Response. Random House. ISBN 978-1-588-36586-6.
- Macintyre, Donald (21 February 2010). "Mossad: Inside the spying game". The Independent.
- Pontaut, Jean-Marie (19 February 2010). "Quand le Mossad tuait à Paris". L'Express.
- Reeve, Simon (2000). One Day in September: The Full Story of the 1972 Munich Olympics Massacre and the Israeli Revenge Operation "Wrath of God". Arcade Publishing. p. 284. ISBN 978-1-559-70547-9.
- Sabbagh, Dan (14 August 2018). "Jeremy Corbyn: I was present at wreath-laying but don't think I was involved". The Guardian.
- Tempest, Rone (9 June 1992). "PLO Official Assassinated on Paris Street". Los Angeles Times.
- West, Nigel (2017). Encyclopedia of Political Assassinations. Rowman & Littlefield. ISBN 978-1-538-10239-8.
