= Mossad assassinations following the Munich massacre =

Operation Bayonet (also nicknamed Operation Wrath of God) (Note: Hebrew: מבצע זעם האל, romanized: Mivtza Za'am Ha'el) was a covert operation directed by Mossad to assassinate individuals they accused of being involved in the 1972 Munich massacre. The targets were members of the Palestinian armed militant group Black September and operatives of the Palestine Liberation Organisation (PLO). Authorised by Israeli Prime Minister Golda Meir in the autumn of 1972, the operation is believed to have continued for over twenty years. While Mossad killed several prominent Palestinians during the operation, they never managed to kill the mastermind behind Munich, namely Abu Daoud.

The operation was depicted in the television film Sword of Gideon (1986) and Steven Spielberg's film Munich (2005).

== History ==
Two days after the Munich massacre at the 1972 Summer Olympics, Israel retaliated by bombing ten PLO bases in Syria and Lebanon. Prime Minister Golda Meir created Committee X, a small group of government officials tasked with formulating an Israeli response, with herself and Defense Minister Moshe Dayan at the head. She also appointed General Aharon Yariv as her Advisor on Counterterrorism; he, along with Mossad Director Zvi Zamir, took the principal role in directing the ensuing operation. The committee came to the conclusion that, to deter future violent incidents against Israel, they needed to assassinate those who had supported or carried out the Munich massacre, and in dramatic fashion.

Pressured by Israeli public opinion and top intelligence officials, Meir reluctantly authorised the beginning of the broad assassination campaign. Yet when the three surviving perpetrators of the massacre were released just months later by West Germany in compliance with the demands of the hijackers of Lufthansa Flight 615, any remaining ambivalence she felt was removed. The committee's first task for Israeli intelligence was to draw up an assassination list of all those involved in Munich. This was accomplished with the aid of PLO operatives working for Mossad, and with information provided by friendly European intelligence agencies. While the contents of the entire list are unknown, reports put the final number of targets at 20–35, a mix of Black September and PLO elements. (Note: Reeve states that intelligence sources put the number at 20 (Reeve, 162), while Ostrovsky puts it at 35 (Ostrovsky, 179).) Once this was complete, Mossad was charged with locating the individuals and killing them.

Critical in the planning was the idea of plausible deniability, that it should be impossible to prove a direct connection between the assassinations and Israel. In addition, the operations were more generally intended to terrorise Palestinian militants. According to David Kimche, former deputy head of Mossad, "The aim was not so much revenge but mainly to make them [the Palestinian terrorists] frightened. We wanted to make them look over their shoulders and feel that we are upon them. And therefore we tried not to do things by just shooting a guy in the street – that's easy ... fairly."

It is also known that Mossad agent Michael Harari led the creation and direction of the teams, although some may not have always been under government responsibility. Author Simon Reeve explains that the Mossad team – whose squad names are letters of the Hebrew alphabet – consisted of:

...fifteen people divided into five squads: "Aleph", two trained killers; "Bet", two guards who would shadow the Alephs; "Het", two agents who would establish cover for the rest of the team by renting hotel rooms, apartments, cars, and so on; "Ayin", comprising between six and eight agents who formed the backbone of the operation, shadowing targets and establishing an escape route for the Aleph and Bet squads; and "Qoph", two agents specializing in communications.

This is similar to former Mossad katsa Victor Ostrovsky's description of Mossad's own assassination teams, the Kidon. In fact, Ostrovsky says in his book that it was Kidon units that performed the assassinations. This is supported by author Gordon Thomas who was given access to the debriefing reports submitted by the eight Kidon and 80 member backup team that were involved in the assassinations.

Another report by author Aaron J. Klein says that these teams were actually part of a unit called Caesarea, which would be renamed and reorganised into Kidon in the mid-1970s. Harari eventually commanded three Caesarea teams of around 12 members each. They were each further divided into logistics, surveillance, and assassination squads.

One of the covert teams was revealed in the aftermath of the Lillehammer affair (see Ali Hassan Salameh section below), when six members of the Mossad assassination team were arrested by Norwegian authorities. Harari escaped to Israel, and it is possible that others were able to evade capture with him. An article in Time magazine immediately after the killing put the total number of Mossad personnel at 15, which would also be similar to the above descriptions.

A markedly different account comes from the book Vengeance, where the author states that Mossad set up a five-man unit of trained intelligence personnel in Europe – a unit which was led by the person who was also the author's source for the information. The book also says that the team operated outside of direct government control, and that its only communications were with Harari.

Several hours before each assassination, each target's family received flowers with a condolence card reading: "A reminder we do not forget or forgive."

== Operations ==
=== 1972–1988 ===
The first assassination occurred on October 16, 1972, when Palestinian Wael Zwaiter was killed in Rome. Mossad agents had been waiting for him to return from dinner, and shot him twelve times. After the shooting, the agents were spirited away to a safe house. At the time, Zwaiter was the PLO representative in Italy, and while Israel privately claimed he was a member of Black September and was involved in a failed plot against an El Al airliner, members of the PLO argued that he was in no way connected. Abu Iyad, deputy-chief of the PLO, stated that Zwaiter was "energetically" against terrorism.

The second target of Mossad was Mahmoud Hamshari, the PLO representative in France. Israel believed that he was the leader of Black September in France. Using an agent posing as an Italian journalist, Mossad lured him from his apartment in Paris to allow a demolition team to enter and install a bomb underneath a desk telephone. On December 8, 1972, the agent posing as a journalist phoned Hamshari's apartment and asked if he was speaking to Hamshari. After Hamshari identified himself, the agent signalled to other colleagues, who then sent a detonation signal down the telephone line, causing the bomb to explode. Hamshari was mortally wounded in the explosion, but managed to remain conscious long enough to tell detectives what had happened. Hamshari died in a hospital several weeks later. He had given an interview a day after the hostage crisis, saying he was not worried for his life, but did not want to "taunt the devil." Mossad did not comment on the fact that Hamsari was connected to the attack of Munich. This assassination was the first in a series of Mossad targeted killings that took place in France.

On the night of January 24, 1973, Hussein Al Bashir, a Jordanian, the Fatah representative in Cyprus, turned off the lights in his Olympic Hotel room in Nicosia. Moments later, a bomb planted under his bed was remotely detonated, killing him and destroying the room. Israel believed him to be the head of Black September in Cyprus, though another reason for his assassination may have been his close ties with the KGB.

On April 6, 1973, Basil Al Kubaisi, a law professor at the American University of Beirut suspected by Israel of providing arms logistics for Black September as well as being involved in other Palestinian plots, was gunned down in Paris while returning home from dinner. As in previous assassinations, he was shot around 12 times by two Mossad agents. According to police, the bullets were "carefully grouped about his heart and in his head".

Three of the targets on Mossad's list lived in heavily guarded houses in Lebanon that were beyond the reach of previous assassination methods. In order to assassinate them, Operation Spring of Youth was launched as a sub-operation of the larger "Wrath of God" campaign. On the night of April 9, 1973, Sayeret Matkal, Shayetet 13, and Sayeret Tzanhanim commandos landed on the coast of Lebanon in Zodiac speedboats launched from Israeli Navy missile boats offshore. The commandos were met by Mossad agents, who drove them to their targets in cars rented the previous day, and later drove them back to the beaches for extraction. The commandos were disguised as civilians, and some were dressed as women. In Beirut, they raided guarded apartment buildings and killed Muhammad Youssef al-Najjar (Operations leader in Black September), Kamal Adwan (a Chief of Operations in the PLO), and Kamal Nasser (PLO Executive Committee member and spokesman). During the operation, two Lebanese police officers, an Italian citizen, and Najjar's wife were also killed. One Israeli commando was wounded. Sayeret Tzanhanim paratroopers raided a six-story building that served as the headquarters of the Popular Front for the Liberation of Palestine. The paratroopers met strong resistance and lost two soldiers, but managed to destroy the building. Shayetet 13 naval commandos and Sayeret Tzanhanim paratroopers also raided PLO arms-manufacturing facilities and fuel dumps. Some 12–100 PLO and PFLP members were killed during the attacks.

Three attacks quickly followed the Lebanon operation. Zaiad Muchasi, the replacement for Hussein Al Bashir in Cyprus, was killed by a bomb in his Athens hotel room on April 11. Two minor Black September members, Abdel Hamid Shibi and Abdel Hadi Nakaa, were seriously injured when their car was bombed in Rome.

Mossad agents also began to follow Mohammad Boudia, the Algerian-born director of operations for Black September in France, who was known for his disguises and womanising. On June 28, 1973, Boudia was killed in Paris by a pressure-activated bomb packed with heavy nuts and bolts placed under his car seat.

On December 15, 1979, two Palestinians, Ali Salem Ahmed and Ibrahim Abdul Aziz, were killed in Cyprus. According to police, both men were shot with suppressed weapons at point-blank range.

On June 17, 1982, two senior PLO members in Italy were killed in separate attacks. Nazeyh Mayer, a leading figure in the PLO's Rome office, was shot dead outside his home. Kamal Husain, deputy director of the PLO office in Rome, was killed by a shrapnel bomb placed under the back seat of his car as he drove home, less than seven hours after he had visited the home of Mayer and helped the police in their investigation.

On July 23, 1982, Fadl Dani, deputy director of the PLO office in Paris, was killed by a bomb that had been placed in his car. On August 21, 1983, PLO official Mamoun Meraish was killed in his car in Athens by two Mossad operatives who shot him from a motorcycle.

On June 10, 1986, Khaled Ahmed Nazal, Secretary-General of the PLO's DFLP faction, was gunned down outside a hotel in Athens, Greece. Nazal was shot four times in the head. On October 21, 1986, Munzer Abu Ghazala, a senior PLO official and member of the Palestinian National Council, was killed by a bomb as he drove through a suburb of Athens.

On February 14, 1988, a car bomb exploded in Limassol, Cyprus, killing Palestinians Abu Al Hassan Qasim and Hamdi Adwan, and wounding Marwan Kanafami.

=== Ali Hassan Salameh ===
Mossad continued to search for Ali Hassan Salameh, nicknamed the Red Prince, who was the head of Force 17 and the Black September operative believed by Israel to be the mastermind behind the Munich massacre. This belief has since been challenged by accounts of senior Black September officials, who say that while he was involved in many attacks in Europe, Salameh was not at all connected with the events in Munich.

Almost a full year after Munich, Mossad believed they had finally located Salameh in the small Norwegian town of Lillehammer. On July 21, 1973, in what would become known as the Lillehammer affair, a team of Mossad agents shot and killed Ahmed Bouchiki, a Moroccan waiter unrelated to the Munich attack and Black September, after an informant mistakenly identified Bouchiki as Salameh. Six Mossad agents, including two women, were arrested by local police, while others, including the team leader, Michael Harari, managed to escape back to Israel. Five of the captured were convicted of the killing and imprisoned, but were released and returned to Israel in 1975. Victor Ostrovsky claimed that Salameh was instrumental in leading Mossad off course by feeding it false information about his whereabouts.

In January 1974, Mossad agents covertly deployed to Switzerland after receiving information that Salameh would meet PLO leaders in a church on January 12. Two assassins entered the church at the time of the meeting, and encountered three men who appeared to be Arab. One of them made a move for his weapon, and all three were then immediately shot and killed. The Mossad agents continued into the church to search for Salameh, but did not find him. In a short time, the decision was made to abort the mission and escape.

Following the incident, operation commander Michael Harari ordered the mission to kill Salameh be aborted. The Kidon team, however, elected to ignore the order and tried one more time to kill Salameh. Intelligence placed Salameh at a house in Tarifa, Spain. As three agents moved toward the house, they were approached by an Arab security guard. The guard raised an AK-47 assault rifle, and was immediately shot. The operation was aborted, and the team escaped to a safe house.

In the aftermath of the Lillehammer affair, international outrage prompted Golda Meir to order the suspension of Operation "Wrath of God". The ensuing Norwegian investigation and revelations by the captured agents compromised Mossad assets across Europe, including safe houses, agents, and operational methods. Five years later, it was decided to recommence the operation under new Prime Minister Menachem Begin, and find those on the list still at large.

Mossad began surveillance of Salameh's movements after tracking him to Beirut during late autumn of 1978. In November 1978, a female Mossad agent identifying herself as Erika Chambers entered Lebanon with a British passport issued in 1975, and rented an apartment on the Rue Verdun, a street frequently used by Salameh. Several other agents arrived, including two using the pseudonyms Peter Scriver and Roland Kolberg, traveling with British and Canadian passports respectively. Some time after their arrival a Volkswagen packed with plastic explosives was parked along Rue Verdun within view of the rented apartment. At 3:35 p.m. on January 22, 1979, as Salameh and four bodyguards drove down the street in a Chevrolet station wagon, the explosives in the Volkswagen were detonated from the apartment with a radio device, killing everyone in the vehicle. After five unsuccessful attempts, Mossad had assassinated Salameh. However, the blast also killed four innocent bystanders, including a British student and a German nun, and injured 18 other people in the vicinity. Immediately following the operation the three Mossad officers fled without trace, as well as up to 14 other agents believed to have been involved in the operation.

=== Munich hostage-takers ===
Three of the eight terrorists that carried out the Munich massacre survived the botched German rescue attempt at Fürstenfeldbruck airbase on September 6, 1972 and were taken into German custody: Jamal Al-Gashey, Adnan Al-Gashey, and Mohammed Safady. On October 29, they were released in exchange for the hostages onboard hijacked Lufthansa Flight 615 and travelled to Libya, where they went into hiding.

It had been thought that Adnan Al-Gashey and Mohammed Safady were both assassinated by Mossad several years after the massacre; Al-Gashey was found after making contact with a cousin in a Gulf State, and Safady was found by remaining in touch with family in Lebanon. This account was challenged by Aaron J. Klein, who wrote that Adnan died of heart failure in the 1970s and that Safady was killed by Christian Phalangists in Lebanon in the early 1980s. However, in July 2005, PLO veteran Tawfiq Tirawi told Klein that Safady, whom Tirawi claimed as a close friend, was "as alive as you are." Jamal Al-Gashey went into hiding in North Africa, and is believed to be living in Tunisia; he last surfaced in 1999, when he granted an interview to director Kevin MacDonald for the documentary One Day in September.

=== Other actions ===
Along with direct assassinations, Mossad used a variety of other means to respond to the Munich massacre and deter future terrorist action. Mossad engaged in a campaign of letter bombs against Palestinian officials across Europe. Historian Benny Morris writes that these attacks caused non-fatal injuries to their targets, which included persons in Algeria and Libya, Palestinian student activists in Bonn and Copenhagen, and a Red Crescent official in Stockholm. Klein also cites an incident in Cairo where a bomb malfunctioned, sparing the two Palestinian targets.

Former Mossad katsa Victor Ostrovsky claimed that Mossad also used psychological warfare tactics such as running obituaries of still-living militants and sending highly detailed personal information to others. Reeve further stated that Mossad would call junior Palestinian officials, and after divulging to them their personal information, would warn them to disassociate from any Palestinian cause.

=== Other assassinations ===
Several assassinations or assassination attempts have been attributed to the "Wrath of God" campaign, although doubt exists as to whether Mossad was behind them, with breakaway Palestinian factions being suspected of carrying them out. The first such assassination occurred on January 4, 1978, when Said Hammami, the PLO representative in London, was shot and killed. The assassination is suspected of being the work of either Mossad or the Abu Nidal Organisation. On August 3, 1978, Ezzedine Kalak, chief of the PLO's Paris bureau, and his deputy Hamad Adnan, were killed at their offices in the Arab League building. Three other members of the Arab League and PLO staff were wounded. This attack was either the work of Mossad or the Abu Nidal Organisation. On July 27, 1979. Zuheir Mohsen, head of PLO military operations, was gunned down in Cannes, France, just after leaving a casino. Responsibility for the attack has been placed by various sources on Mossad, other Palestinians, and possibly Egypt.

On June 1, 1981, Naim Khader, the PLO representative in Belgium, was assassinated in Brussels. Officials at the PLO information and liaison office in Brussels issued a statement accusing Israel of being behind the killing. Abu Daoud, a Black September commander who openly claimed to have helped plan the Munich attack, was shot multiple times on August 1, 1981 by a gunman in a Warsaw hotel cafe. Daoud survived the attack. It is unclear whether this was done by Mossad or another breakaway Palestinian faction. Daoud claimed that the attack was carried out by a Palestinian double agent for Mossad, who was killed by the PLO ten years later. On March 1, 1982, PLO official Nabil Wadi Aranki was killed in Madrid. On June 8, 1992 PLO head of intelligence Atef Bseiso was shot and killed in Paris by two gunmen with suppressed weapons. While the PLO and a book by Israeli author Aaron J. Klein blamed Mossad for the killing, other reports indicate that the Abu Nidal Organisation was behind it.

=== Secret assistance from European governments ===
The Club de Berne is an intelligence sharing alliance between many European intelligence agencies. In a program of the Club codenamed "Kilowatt," European intelligence agencies assisted Israeli assassins to find their victims, and official interventions coordinated through the Club allowed Israeli assassins to avoid being detained by local police.

== Reactions ==
=== Black September response ===
Black September did attempt and carry out a number of attacks and hostage takings against Israel.

Similar to the Mossad letter-bomb campaign, dozens of letter bombs were sent from Amsterdam to Israeli diplomatic posts around the world in September and October 1972. One such attack killed Ami Shachori, an Israeli Agricultural Counsellor in Britain.

==== Attempted assassination of Golda Meir in Rome ====
A terrorist operation was planned by Black September when it learned that Israeli Prime Minister Golda Meir would be travelling to Rome to meet with Pope Paul VI in January 1973. The planned visit was placed under a regimen of strict secrecy in Israel, and news of the upcoming visit was probably leaked by a pro-Palestinian priest in the Vatican Secretariat of State. Black September commander Ali Hassan Salameh began planning a missile attack against Meir's plane as it arrived in Rome. Salameh's goal was to kill not only Meir, but also key cabinet ministers and senior Mossad officers accompanying her. At the time, Salameh was negotiating with the Soviet Union, asking for safe haven, and he hoped that by the time Israel recovered from this blow, he and his men would be in the Soviet Union and out of Israel's reach. Black September smuggled several shoulder-launched Strela-2 missiles to Bari, Italy, from Dubrovnik, Yugoslavia, by boat. The missiles were then smuggled to Rome and positioned around Fiumicino Airport shortly before Meir's arrival. To divert Mossad's vigilance away from Rome in the run-up to the attack, Salameh planned a terrorist attack on the Israeli embassy in Bangkok, Thailand.

On December 28, 1972, four Black September members took over the Israeli embassy in Bangkok, holding 12 hostages. They raised the PLO flag over the building, and threatened to kill the hostages unless 36 PLO prisoners were released. The building was surrounded by Thai troops and police. The option of a rescue operation was considered in Israel but ruled out. A rescue operation was considered a logistical impossibility, and it was also thought that as the embassy was in busy central Bangkok, the Thai government would never allow the possibility of a shootout to occur. Though their demands were not met, negotiations secured the release of all the hostages and the Black September militants were given safe passage to Cairo.

Mossad found out about the plan to assassinate Golda Meir on January 14, 1973, when a local volunteer informed Mossad that he had handled two telephone calls from a payphone in an apartment block where PLO members sometimes stayed. The calls were in Arabic, which he spoke. Speaking in code, the caller stated that it was "time to deliver the birthday candles for the celebration". Mossad Director-General Zvi Zamir was convinced that this was a coded order connected to an upcoming attack. Zamir had been convinced that the Bangkok embassy raid was a diversion for a larger attack, due to the participants in the raid having so easily given up, something he did not expect from a group as well-trained, financed, strategically cunning, and motivated as Black September. Zamir further interpreted that "birthday candles" could refer to weapons, and the most likely one with a candle connotation was a rocket. Zamir linked the possible upcoming missile attack with Meir's upcoming arrival, and guessed that Black September was planning to shoot down Meir's plane. Zamir then sent a Mossad katsa, or field intelligence officer, to Rome, and travelled to the city with a team of Mossad officers. Zamir met with the head of DIGOS, the Italian anti-terrorism unit, and laid out his concerns. DIGOS officers raided the apartment blocks from where the calls had been made, and found a Soviet instruction manual for launching missiles. Throughout the night, DIGOS teams, each accompanied by a Mossad katsa, raided known PLO apartments, but found no evidence of any plot to kill Meir. In the morning, a few hours before Meir's plane arrived, Mossad agents and Italian police surrounded Fiumicino Airport.

A Mossad katsa spotted a Fiat van parked in a field close to the flight path. The agent ordered the driver to step out. The back door then flew open, and two militants opened fire. The agent returned fire, severely wounding both of them. The van was found to contain six missiles. The driver escaped on foot, and was pursued by the agent. He was captured as he tried to hijack a car driven by another patrolling Mossad operative. The driver was bundled into the car and taken to the truck that served as Mossad's mobile command post, where he revealed the whereabouts of the second missile team after being severely beaten. The truck then sped off, heading north. A cafe-van with three missile launchers protruding from the roof was spotted. The truck then rammed the van, turning it over, trapping the launch team inside and half-crushing them beneath the weight of the missiles, and turning the van's fixed launchers away from the sky. The unconscious driver was pulled from the van and tossed to the side of the road, and DIGOS was alerted that there had been "an interesting accident they should look into". Zamir briefly considered killing the Palestinian terrorists, but felt that their deaths would serve as an embarrassment to Golda Meir's audience with the pope. The terrorists, who had been involved in the Munich massacre, were taken to the hospital and eventually allowed to fly to Libya, but within months, all were killed by Mossad.

==== Assassinations of other Israelis and international officials ====
Suspected Israeli intelligence agents were shot and killed, as well as an Israeli official in Washington. Vittorio Olivares, an Italian El Al employee suspected by Black September, was shot and killed in Rome in April 1973. The Israeli military attaché to the United States, Colonel Yosef Alon, was assassinated on July 1, 1973 in Chevy Chase, Maryland. Alon's killer was never officially identified, and the FBI closed its investigation after failing to identify the culprits, but theorised that Black September was behind the assassination. Fred Burton, former deputy chief of the counterterrorism division of the US State Department's Diplomatic Security Service and Vice-President of the private intelligence and consulting firm Stratfor, conducted an investigation and concluded that Alon's killer was a Black September operative who was killed by Mossad in 2011. Ami Shachori, an agriculture counsellor working at the Israeli Embassy in London, was assassinated by Black September on September 19, 1973.

Black September conducted several other attacks only indirectly against Israel, including the seizure of Western diplomats in the Saudi embassy in Khartoum (see: 1973 Khartoum diplomatic assassinations), but the group was officially dissolved by al-Fatah in December 1974.

=== Arab reaction ===
While the first wave of assassinations from October 1972 to early 1973 caused greater consternation among Palestinian officials, it was the raid on Lebanon – Operation Spring of Youth in April 1973 – that truly shocked the Arab world. The audacity of the mission, plus the fact that senior leaders such as Yasser Arafat, Abu Iyad, and Ali Hassan Salameh were only yards away from the fighting, contributed to the creation of the belief that Israel was capable of striking anywhere, anytime. It also brought about popular mourning. At the funerals for the victims of the raid, half a million people came into the streets of Beirut. Nearly six years later, 100,000 people, including Arafat, turned out in the same city to bury Salameh.

The operation also caused some of the less radical Arab governments to begin putting pressure on Palestinians to stop attacks against Israeli targets and threatened to pull support for the Palestinians if they used their passports during the course of attacks against Israel. As a result, some Palestinian militants began to instead use forged Israeli documents.

== Criticism ==
In his 2005 book Striking Back, author Aaron J. Klein – who says he based his book in large part on rare interviews with key Mossad officers involved in the reprisal missions – contends that Mossad got only one man directly connected to the massacre. The man, Atef Bseiso, was killed in Paris in 1992. Klein goes on to say that the intelligence on Wael Zwaiter, the first Palestinian to die, was "uncorroborated and improperly cross-referenced. Looking back, his assassination was a mistake." He elaborates, stating that the real planners and executors of Munich had gone into hiding along with bodyguards in the Eastern Bloc and Arab world, where Israel could not reach them. Most of those killed were minor Palestinian figures who happened to be wandering unprotected around Western Europe. "Israeli security officials claimed these dead men were responsible for Munich; PLO pronouncements made them out to be important figures; and so the image of Mossad as capable of delivering death at will grew and grew." The operation functioned not just to punish the perpetrators of Munich but also to disrupt and deter future terrorist acts, writes Klein. "For the second goal, one dead PLO operative was as good as another." Klein quotes a senior intelligence source: "Our blood was boiling. When there was information implicating someone, we didn't inspect it with a magnifying glass."

Abu Daoud, one of the main planners of the Munich massacre, said in interviews before the release of the movie Munich that "I returned to Ramallah in 1995, and Israel knew that I was the planner of the Munich operation." The leader of Black September, Abu Iyad, was also not killed by Israel, although he was assassinated in 1991 in Tunis by the Abu Nidal Organization. Former Mossad chief Zvi Zamir countered this in an interview in 2006, when he said that Israel was more interested in striking the "infrastructure of the terrorist organizations in Europe" than those directly responsible for Munich. "We had no choice but to start with preventive measures."

As the campaign continued, relatives of the athletes killed at Munich were kept informed. Simon Reeve writes that some felt vindicated, while others, including the wife of fencer Andre Spitzer, felt ambivalent. The wife of assassinated Mossad agent Baruch Cohen called the operation, especially a side operation directed against those who had murdered her husband, sickening.

According to Ronen Bergman (security correspondent for the Israeli newspaper Yediot Ahronoth and expert on Mossad): "This campaign stopped most PLO terrorism outside the borders of Israel. Did it help in any way to bring peace to the Middle East? No. Strategically it was a complete failure."

Former katsa Victor Ostrovsky has said that the direction Meir set Mossad on, namely that of focusing heavily on the people and operations of the PLO, took energy away from intelligence gathering on Israel's neighbors. This led Mossad to miss the warning signs of the 1973 Yom Kippur War, which caught Israeli defenses by surprise.

== In popular culture ==
The 1984 book Vengeance, by Canadian journalist George Jonas, tells the story of an Israeli assassination squad from the viewpoint of a self-described former Mossad agent and leader of the squad, Avner. Avner has since been claimed to be a pseudonym for Yuval Aviv, an Israeli who now runs a private investigation agency in New York. However, Jonas denies that Aviv was his source for Vengeance, although the book has not been independently verified beyond the fact checking Jonas says he has done. Jonas points to a former Director General of the RCMP Security Service, John Starnes, who he says believes his source's essential story. In spite of this, Mossad's director at the time of the operation, Zvi Zamir, has stated that he never knew Aviv. Several former Mossad officers who took part in Operation "Wrath of God" have also told British journalists that Yuval Aviv's version of events is not accurate. After its 1984 publication the book was listed on the fiction and non-fiction bestseller lists in Britain.

Since its release, two films have been based on Vengeance. In 1986, Michael Anderson directed the HBO film Sword of Gideon. Steven Spielberg released a second movie based on the account in December 2005 entitled Munich. Both movies use Yuval Aviv's pseudonym "Avner" and take a certain amount of artistic license with his account.

== See also ==
- Counterterrorism
- Dahiya doctrine
- Israeli targeted killings
- Lillehammer affair
- List of Israeli assassinations
- Operation Nemesis, conducted by Armenians in the 1920s in response to the Armenian genocide.
- Samson Option
- Selective assassination
- Special Activities Center
- Targeted killing
