= Lillehammer affair =

Murder by Mossad in Lillehammer, Norway

Ahmed Bouchikhi

The Lillehammer affair was the murder of Ahmed Bouchikhi, a Moroccan waiter, by Mossad agents in Lillehammer, Norway, on 21 July 1973. The Israeli agents had mistaken him for their target Ali Hassan Salameh, the chief of operations of the group Black September. Six of the fifteen members of the Mossad team were captured and convicted of complicity in the killing by the Norwegian justice system, in a major blow to the intelligence agency's reputation.

== Background ==
Undercover Mossad agents had been sent by Israel as part of series of planned assassinations following the 1972 Munich massacre to assassinate Ali Hassan Salameh, the head of Force 17 and an operative of the Black September Organization, the Palestinian militant group responsible. In the summer of 1973, Mossad received a tip that Salameh was working as a waiter in Lillehammer in Norway. Author and former Mossad katsa (case officer) Victor Ostrovsky wrote that Salameh was instrumental in leading Mossad off course by feeding it false information about his whereabouts. A team of 15 Mossad agents was sent to Lillehammer to assassinate him, where they were joined by Mossad director general Zvi Zamir and operation commander Michael Harari. Lillehammer was a relatively small city, and the sudden arrival of more than a dozen strangers attracted attention from residents. The local police began to watch them.

A known Palestinian courier in Lillehammer was identified and followed by Mossad agents to a public swimming pool, where he was seen speaking with Bouchikhi, who had no connection to any Palestinian armed groups and whose conversation with the courier was coincidental. The agents came to believe that Bouchikhi, who resembled Salameh, matched the photographs of Salameh. A female Mossad agent then jumped into the pool and got close enough to Bouchikhi to hear him speaking French. The agents knew that Salameh was multilingual, and concluded that this had to be him. The Mossad team followed Bouchikhi to his home. His residence was placed under constant surveillance by Mossad agents sitting in hired cars.

== Assassination ==
On the evening of 21 July, a day after having misidentified Bouchikhi as Salameh, the Mossad agents carried out the assassination. Bouchikhi and his pregnant wife had gone to see a movie. After taking a bus back and getting off at a bus stop, they began slowly walking back home. As they were in sight of their home, a car with four Mossad agents pulled up beside them. While two stayed in the car to provide cover, the other two got out and shot Bouchikhi thirteen times with a .22 caliber pistol, his wife witnessing the shooting. They then jumped back into the car, which immediately drove away at high speed. Local police were close by, but by the time police and rescue arrived, Bouchikhi was dead.

The killing shocked the residents of Lillehammer, where there had not been a murder for 36 years. The Israelis learned that they had killed the wrong man after the story was publicized the following day. Nine members of the hit team, including the two actual murderers, escaped and had left Norway by the day following the assassination. Six other members of the team, four men and two women, were arrested before they could escape. Two agents were caught in a getaway car they were using again without having changed the license plates while trying to get to an airport the day after the assassination. Their interrogations led to the arrests of the remaining members of the cell. Incriminating documents and the keys to a network of safe houses were discovered.

While the defence counsel said their clients played only minor roles such as shadowing and passing on information, five of the six agents were found guilty on a variety of charges and convicted of complicity in the killing, receiving sentences ranging from one year to five and a half years but were released and returned to Israel in 1975. The Mossad later found Ali Hassan Salameh in Beirut and killed him on 22 January 1979 with a remote-controlled car bomb in an attack that also caused the deaths of eight other persons (including four of Salameh's bodyguards) and injured eighteen others.

== Later developments ==
The revelations of the captured agents dealt a massive blow to the secret infrastructure of the Mossad in Europe. The captured agents were interrogated over the operation. One of them, Dan Arbel, became extremely nervous as soon as his cell door shut due to his extreme claustrophobia; he provided many details on the operation in exchange for being transferred to a larger cell with a small window. Authorities discovered a key on one of the suspects for a Mossad safe house in Paris. It was handed over to the French police, who raided the flat and discovered keys to other Mossad safe houses in the city, along with evidence that several of those involved in the Lillehammer operation had been involved in other assassinations as part of Mossad assassinations following the Munich massacre. Information on Mossad safe houses, phone numbers and agents gathered during the interrogation of the agents was rapidly shared with its European counterparts. As a result, Mossad agents who had been exposed had to be recalled, safe houses abandoned, phone numbers changed and operational methods modified.

For the first time, clear evidence had been found of Israel's involvement in the string of assassinations of Palestinians that had taken place on European soil as part of Operation Wrath of God. Under intense international pressure, Golda Meir ordered the operation suspended. It was resumed under Prime Minister Menachem Begin.

Israel never officially took responsibility for the assassination. In January 1996, Prime Minister Shimon Peres said that Israel would never take responsibility for the killing but would consider compensation. The Government of Israel appointed an attorney, Amnon Goldenberg, to negotiate a settlement with Bouchikhi's widow Torill and daughter Malika, who were represented by attorney Thor-Erik Johansen. That same month, an agreement was reached; Israel paid compensation equal to US$283,000 split between Bouchikhi's wife and daughter. A separate settlement of US$118,000 was paid to a son from a previous marriage. An Israeli statement was also issued which stopped short of an apology but expressed "sorrow" over Bouchikhi's "unfortunate" death.

In 1990, Norway reopened the case. In 1998 it issued a global arrest warrant for the leader of the operation, Michael Harari, who had successfully escaped, but closed the case the following year after judging that it would be impossible to get a conviction. According to the September 2004 book release of Mange liv (English: Many lives) by the former lawyer Annæus Schjødt, who represented two of the agents in the case and later married one of them (Sylvia Raphael), information about the Israeli nuclear weapons program was leaked to the Government of Norway by one of the arrested agents, Dan Arbel. However, the Norwegians decided to remain silent about their findings.

== See also ==
- Assassination of Mahmoud Al-Mabhouh
- Basil Al Kubaisi
- Souhaila Andrawes
