= Lufthansa Flight 615 =

1972 aircraft hijacking by Palestinian militants

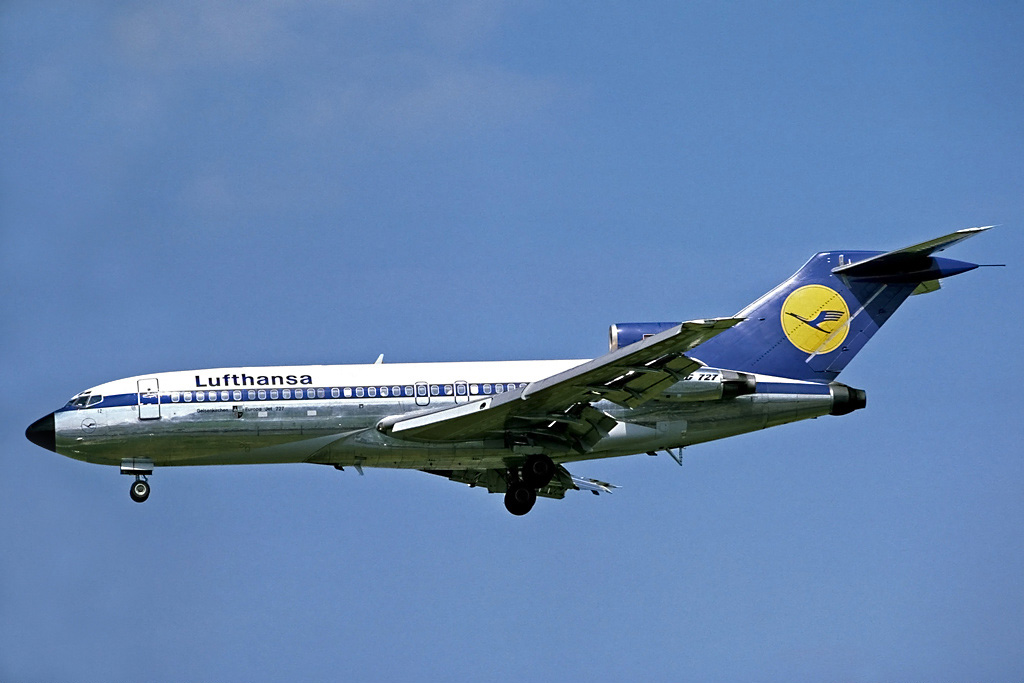
- A Lufthansa Boeing 727-100, similar to the aircraft involved in the hijacking of Flight 615

Hijacking
- Date: 29 October 1972
- Summary: Hijacking
- Site: Tripoli International Airport, Libya; Zagreb Airport, Croatia; Nicosia International Airport, Cyprus

Aircraft
- Aircraft type: Boeing 727-100
- Aircraft name: Kiel
- Operator: Lufthansa
- IATA flight No.: LH615
- ICAO flight No.: DLH615
- Call sign: LUFTHANSA 615
- Registration: D-ABIG
- Flight origin: Damascus International Airport, Damascus, Syria
- Stopover: Beirut–Rafic Hariri International Airport, Beirut, Lebanon
- 2nd stopover: Esenboğa International Airport, Ankara, Turkey
- 3rd stopover: Munich-Riem Airport, Munich, West Germany
- Destination: Frankfurt Airport, Frankfurt, West Germany
- Occupants: 20
- Passengers: 13 (including 2 hijackers)
- Crew: 7
- Fatalities: 0
- Injuries: 0
- Survivors: 20

The hijacking of Lufthansa Flight 615 occurred on 29 October 1972 and was aimed at the release of the three surviving perpetrators of the Munich massacre from a West German prison.

When the Lufthansa airplane was seized by sympathisers of the Black September Organization during the Beirut-Ankara part of a multi-stopover flight from Damascus to Frankfurt, the West German authorities complied with the demand of having the prisoners released. They were handed over at Zagreb Airport, and the hijacked aircraft was flown to Tripoli, where all hostages were released. The liberated Munich attackers were granted asylum by Libyan leader Muammar Gaddafi.

For its actions, the West German government was criticised by Israel and other parties. Allegations were made that the hijacking had been staged or at least tolerated with theories of a secret agreement between the German government and Black September – release of the surviving militants in exchange for assurances of no further attacks on Germany.

== Background ==
=== The Olympic hostage crisis ===
On 5 September 1972, during the Munich Summer Olympics, eight members of the Palestinian group Black September took nine members of the Israeli Olympic team hostage, after killing two other Israeli athletes. During a shoot-out following a failed police rescue attempt at Fürstenfeldbruck Air Base, all hostages were killed. Five of the eight Palestinian militants were also killed. The three surviving perpetrators were Adnan Al-Gashey, Jamal Al-Gashey, and Mohammed Safady, who were arrested and held in pre-trial custody.

In the immediate aftermath of the Munich massacre, West German authorities were concerned over being drawn into the Arab–Israeli conflict. As foreign minister Walter Scheel put it in October 1972, one had to "defend against actions by both sides of the conflict". In Israel, the ensuing German appeasement politics led to comparisons with the 1938 Munich Agreement.

Indeed, since Willy Brandt had become chancellor in 1969, there had been a change of the West German attitude towards the Arab–Israeli conflict. The earlier conservative governments had been considered pointedly pro-Israel (especially during the mid-1960s with the Six-Day War), which had resulted in a number of Arab states breaking off diplomatic relations with West Germany. With Egypt and Tunisia, these had only been restored shortly before the 1972 Olympics.

The West German authorities were aware of the high profile of the prisoners and the fact that the group had numerous sympathisers, so that acts aiming at the liberation of the Munich attackers were feared. Aircraft of then national airline, Lufthansa, or its Israeli counterpart El Al were identified as likely targets. On 9 September, an anonymous letter was received claiming that such a hijacking was indeed imminent, which prompted the Federal Ministry of the Interior (then led by Hans-Dietrich Genscher) to consider whether citizens of Arab states should be denied boarding of Lufthansa flights.

Already during the Munich hostage crisis, it had become evident that the attackers were aware of possible liberation attempts in case of their arrest. Asked if he was afraid of being caught and put into a German prison, their leader Luttif Afif (who was later killed in the Fürstenfeldbruck shootout) had responded that there was nothing to fear, because "there is no death penalty in Germany, and our brothers would liberate us."

=== Aircraft ===
The aircraft involved, manufactured in 1964, was a Boeing 727-100 registered as D-ABIG with serial number 18364 and line number 37. It was equipped with three Pratt & Whitney JT8D-9 engines.

== The hijacking ==
Note: For consistency reasons, all times have been converted to Central European Time.

On Sunday, 29 October 1972, a Lufthansa Boeing 727-100 was hijacked: Flight 615 on the Damascus-Beirut-Ankara-Munich-Frankfurt route. The aircraft had originated at Damascus International Airport in the early morning, with seven crew members but initially without any passengers. At the first stopover at Beirut International Airport, 13 people boarded the flight: nine citizens of unknown Arab countries, two Americans, one German, one Frenchman; and a Spanish journalist who later penned an eyewitness account of the events.

Departure from Beirut was delayed by over 15 minutes. Originally scheduled to depart at 05:45, take-off took place at 06:01. Less than 15 minutes later, two Arab passengers threatened to blow up the aircraft using explosives that had been hidden in the first class cabin (and which likely had been smuggled there in Damascus). They demanded the release of the members of Black September from German prison.

Following a fuel stop at Nicosia International Airport, the pilots were forced to fly towards Munich-Riem Airport, where the hijackers initially had intended the exchange to take place. When the aircraft had arrived in Austrian airspace at around noon, it became evident to the hijackers that their demands could not be fulfilled in time. The plan was changed, and the Lufthansa crew had to divert instead to Zagreb in what was then the Socialist Federal Republic of Yugoslavia, circling over Zagreb Airport until the Black September members had been brought there. This put the Germans under a time crunch, as the aircraft would eventually run out of fuel.

Once word of the hijacking was received at the Lufthansa headquarters in Cologne, chairman Herbert Culmann boarded a corporate Hawker Siddeley HS.125, owned by then subsidiary Condor (registered D-CFCF) and flew to Munich. He was then joined by mayor Georg Kronawitter and police chief Manfred Schreiber, as well as the Bavarian interior minister Bruno Merk at the local crisis committee. The West German governmental response was coordinated by a crisis council in Bonn, which comprised vice chancellor, and foreign minister Walter Scheel and the ministers of the interior and of transportation, Hans-Dietrich Genscher and Lauritz Lauritzen.

Recalling the failed rescue attempt during the Olympic hostage crisis and the (then) lack of a special operations police unit such as the later GSG 9, the West German authorities quickly decided to comply with the demands of the hijackers. By 14:00, the three Black September members had been transported to Riem Airport. Philipp Held, the Bavarian minister for justice, ordered for the revocation of the arrest warrant and had the Black September members issued official emigration papers. The three were brought on board the airplane Culmann had used to get to Munich and were joined by two plain clothes police officers. Culmann decided to head to Zagreb in order to directly assist the negotiations there.

The airplane left Munich, but the pilot had been ordered to stay inside West German airspace. The German negotiators asked that the hijacked Lufthansa jet be allowed to first land at Zagreb, but were unsuccessful in their attempts. The situation tensed when the hijacked Lufthansa aircraft came dangerously close to the point of fuel starvation. In what Culmann later called a "state of emergency," due to an alleged loss of communications with Munich, Culmann then personally ordered the pilot of the aircraft carrying the released Munich attackers to head towards and land at Zagreb Airport. This direction was against orders from higher authorities. As a consequence, a legal investigation against Culmann was initiated, but abandoned shortly thereafter.

Twenty minutes after the three Black September members had arrived at Zagreb Airport, the hijacked Lufthansa jet also landed there and some time later, at 18:05, the transfer took place. This happened without any reciprocal measures: The 18 hostages were not yet released.

Another critical situation unfolded when the Yugoslav authorities in charge of the airport complied with the demands of their counterparts in Bonn and prevented the Lufthansa jet from taking off again. Realizing that the plane would not be refueled, the hijackers again threatened to kill everyone on board. The standoff was broken by Kurt Laqueur, the West German consul in Zagreb, who signed the refueling order without having been authorized to do so. The Lufthansa jet departed at 18:50, this time heading for Tripoli. At 21:03, it arrived at Tripoli International Airport, where the hostages were finally set free.

In Libya and other countries of the region, mass celebrations erupted, with the Lufthansa hijackers and the liberated Munich perpetrators being treated as heroes. Right after their arrival at the airport, a press conference was held, which was broadcast live around the world. The Libyan government led by Muammar Gaddafi allowed the Munich attackers to take refuge and go into hiding, ignoring the demands of West German foreign minister Scheel to put them on trial. In a large scale covert operation dubbed Wrath of God, Israel would subsequently aim at them being tracked down and killed.

== Reactions ==
German politicians of the then government parties (Social Democrats and Liberals) as well as the opposition (the conservative Union parties) generally praised the non-violent outcome of the hijacking. This reflected the public opinion that the release of the Munich attackers would reduce the risk of further attacks against German targets. Criticism evolved around the lack of sufficient airport security to prevent explosives being smuggled into passenger airliners, and Lufthansa not employing sky marshals, which at that time were already common on certain flights by El Al, Pan Am, Swissair, and others.

Israel sharply condemned the release of the Munich perpetrators and accused West Germany of having "capitulated to terrorism". Prime Minister Golda Meir stated on the following day: "We have been depressed since yesterday, aggrieved and I would say insulted, that the human spirit, so weak and helpless, has surrendered to brutal force." Foreign Minister Abba Eban filed an official protest note with the West German government, and the Israeli ambassador in Bonn was temporarily called back, officially due to consultations.

== Allegations of West German government involvement ==
In the immediate aftermath of the hijacking of Flight 615, as well as on a number of later occasions, concerns were voiced that the event might have been staged or at least tolerated by the West German government in order to "get rid of three murderers, which had become a security burden" (as Amnon Rubinstein wrote in Israeli newspaper Haaretz under the headline "Bonn's Disgrace" shortly after the prisoner release). Arguments frequently made during such allegations are the "suspiciously" low passenger number (there were only 13 male passengers on board the hijacked Boeing 727-100, an aircraft type with a seating capacity of 130–150), the "surprisingly" quick decision to have the prisoners released, as well as purported contacts of the West German Federal Intelligence Service to the Palestine Liberation Organization.

The West German trade interests in Arab countries as well as the desire to be spared from future acts of terror were alleged as motives for a government involvement. Shortly after the events surrounding Flight 615, Haim Yosef Zadok accused West Germany in a Knesset speech of having "used the opportunity to improve its relations to the Arab world." In his 1999 autobiography, Abu Daoud (the mastermind behind the Munich massacre) claims that he had been offered $9 million by "the Germans" for faking the prisoner release. However, in later years, he refused to repeat or elaborate this allegation. In a 2006 interview with Frankfurter Allgemeine Zeitung, Zvi Zamir, the head of Mossad from 1968 to 1974, states that he was certain that there had been some kind of an agreement between West Germany and Black September.

The Oscar-winning documentary film One Day in September (which was released in 1999 and covers the Munich massacre) supports the thesis that the hijacking of Lufthansa Flight 615 was "a set-up, organized by the German government in collusion with the militants," which corresponds to remarks by Jamal Al-Gashey about the aftermath of his liberation. The film features an interview with Ulrich Wegener, a German counter-terrorism expert and founding commander of GSG 9, who calls such allegations "probably true". Wegener is also quoted with the opinion that considerations of the West German authorities on how to deal with the hostage situation had likely been mainly driven by the desire to prevent the country from becoming the focus for further acts of terror.

In 2013, investigative journalists of German television programme Report München cited a letter by the Munich police chief, which had been sent to the Bavarian interior ministry eleven days prior to the hijacking of Flight 615. It describes measures that had been taken in order to "accelerate the deportation" of the Munich attackers, rather than preparing for them to be put on trial.

A counter-argument to accusations of a pre-arranged prisoner release includes highlighting the lack of planning and communications that the German negotiators had during the hostage crisis. The situation had been chaotic and confusing at times, making it unlikely that negotiations were scripted. LH 615 – Operation München, a 1975 documentary feature produced by Bayerischer Rundfunk, attributes the non-violent outcome of the hijacking to Lufthansa chairman Culmann and consul Laqueur: They had acted on their own terms rather than obeying orders by governmental officials.

== See also ==
- El Al Flight 426: A 1968 hijacking that had resulted in Israel releasing Arab prisoners in exchange for the hostages.
- Lufthansa Flight 649: Another hijacking that had happened earlier in 1972 and concluded with the West German government paying a $5 million ransom.
- Lufthansa Flight 181: A 1977 hijacking during which the West German government would not comply with the demand of having Palestinian militants released.
