= Adnan Al-Gashey =

Libyan militant

Adnan Al-Gashey (1946 – 1978 or 1979) was a Palestinian militant and one of eight Black September Organization militants who invaded the Israeli quarters at the Munich Olympic Village during the 1972 Summer Olympics. The group took hostage nine of the Israeli Olympic delegation after killing Israeli wrestling coach Moshe Weinberg and weightlifter Yossef Romano in the initial takeover. He was the uncle of Jamal Al-Gashey, who also took part in the Munich operation.

== Early life ==
Al-Gashey was a former student of nursing in University of Tripoli, Libya and had won a scholarship to study chemistry at the American University of Beirut. Unlike some of his fellow fedayeen, he did not have any connections with Germany, but was described by author Simon Reeve as "resourceful, reliable and committed."

== Role in the Munich massacre ==
Though Al-Gashey was one of eight militants involved in the attack at the Israeli delegations quarters in the Munich Olympic Village, unlike some of the other militants, he is not easily identifiable in any of the footage of the day's events. Any mention of Al-Gashey in the crisis at all is identified by author Simon Reeve, who in his book One Day in September (2000) cites Al-Gashey as the militant that machine-gunned the Israelis in the helicopter. After the shootout at Fürstenfeldbruck Air Base, he was captured along with his nephew Jamal Al-Gashey, and Mohammed Safady.

== Aftermath ==
Al-Gashey, his nephew Jamal Al-Gashey, and Mohammed Safady were released seven and a half weeks later on 29 October 1972, when Lufthansa Flight 615 from Damascus to Frankfurt was hijacked by Arab militants. The hijackers demanded the release of the three surviving militants or they would blow up the plane. Without consulting the Israeli government, the West German government acquiesced to their demands.

In a press conference given by the three surviving militants in Tripoli shortly after their release from Germany, Adnan Al-Gashey was asked by a British journalist if he, personally, shot the Israelis. Al-Gashey replied in English:

Al-Gashey: It's not important to say if I killed Israeli or not. Reporter: But they were unarmed, the Israeli hostages, did you shoot any of them yourself? Al-Gashey: They are unarmed, but we have to know that Israeli is our enemy, Israel is our enemy...so we have to kill Israeli because...(cut off by spokesman interjecting)

== Death ==
The circumstances of Al-Gashey's death remain uncertain. In the documentary film One Day in September (2000), it is stated that Israeli Mossad assassination squads killed both him and Mohammad Safady. However, in his book Striking Back: The 1972 Munich Olympics Massacre and Israel's Deadly Response, Aaron J. Klein states that Mossad reported Al-Gashey died naturally in Dubai sometime between 1978 and 1979, from a genetic heart condition.

It can be assumed, however, that by the year 2000, with the publishing of Simon Reeve's book, Al-Gashey had died, as his wife gives a description of him in the past tense.

== Portrayal in film ==
Al-Gashey is portrayed by French Moroccan actor Karim Saidi in the 2005 film Munich.

== See also ==
- Palestine Liberation Organization
- Mossad assassinations following the Munich massacre
- List of hostage crises
