= Mohammed Safady =

Black September militant (born 1953)

- Born: 1953 (age 71–72)
- Occupation: Member of Black September
- Known for: Participating in the 1972 Munich massacre

Mohammed Safady (Arabic: محمد الصفدي, romanized: Muḥammad al-Ṣafadī; born 1953) is a Palestinian militant and one of eight Black September members who perpetrated the Munich massacre, in which they invaded the Israeli quarters at the Munich Olympic Village during the 1972 Munich Olympic Games, taking hostage nine of the Israeli Olympic delegation after killing Israeli wrestling coach Moshe Weinberg and weightlifter Yossef Romano in the initial takeover.

== Attack at 31 Connollystraße ==
In the early morning of 5 September 1972, Safady and seven other members of the Black September group broke into the Israeli delegation's headquarters at 31 Connollystraße. After they had captured the athletes in apartment number one and three, they led them under guard down the stairs to the ground floor of the building. As Israeli wrestler Gad Tsobari reached the bottom of the stairs, he pushed a hooded militant aside and made a dash towards the entrance to the underground car park. While Tsobari made his escape, wrestling coach Moshe Weinberg tackled Safady, landing a powerful punch on his jaw, fracturing it and knocking out several of his teeth. As Moshe Weinberg attempted to seize Safady's gun, which now lay on the floor, another militant shot Weinberg through the chest with a burst from his Kalashnikov rifle.

== Fürstenfeldbruck Air Base ==
Safady, along with Jamal and Adnan Al-Gashey were the only three of the eight militants to survive the firefight with German police at Fürstenfeldbruck.

== Aftermath ==
After their release by the German government on 29 October 1972, seven and a half weeks after they were captured, Safady, along with Jamal and Adnan Al-Gashey were flown to Tripoli, where they gave a press conference to the world's media. Safady can be seen seated to the right of Jamal, who is in the centre.

Safady's fate after the Munich attack has caused much speculation. The documentary One Day in September (2000) states that he was killed by Israeli assassination squads in the aftermath of the Munich operation. However, in his book Striking Back: The 1972 Munich Olympics Massacre and Israel's Deadly Response, author Aaron J. Klein claims that during a conversation with Tawfik Tirawi in Ramallah in 2005, he was told that Safady was "alive as you are". Tirawi did not divulge any further information, only adding that "the Israelis could still harm him." Klein also claims that members of the intelligence community speculated that Safady could have been killed by Lebanese Christian Phalangists as a 'gesture' to the Israeli Mossad.

In 2022, a man alleging to be Safady was interviewed for a German documentary film titled Tod und Spiele München 1972. He admitted to having killed the Israeli hostages, emphasizing his pride in those actions and his lack of regret or remorse for having committed them. He was paid US$2,000 for exclusive rights to use the clip.

== See also ==
- Palestine Liberation Organization
- Mossad assassinations following the Munich massacre
- List of hostage crises
