= Andre Spitzer =

Israeli fencer and Munich massacre victim

- אנדרי שפיצר
- Born: 4 July 1945; Timișoara, Kingdom of Romania
- Died: 6 September 1972 (aged 27); Fürstenfeldbruck, Bavaria, West Germany
- Cause of death: Homicide by gunshot
- Body discovered: Fürstenfeldbruck Air Base
- Resting place: Kiryat Shaul Cemetery; Tel Aviv, Israel; 32°07′45″N 34°49′25″E
- Education: Wingate Institute
- Occupation: Fencing coach
- Years active: 1964–1972
- Known for: Killed by terrorists in the Munich massacre
- Height: 5 ft 10 in (178 cm)
- Spouse: Ankie Spitzer
- Children: Anouk Yael Spitzer
- Parent(s): Tibor Spitzer (father); Leonora Spitzer (mother)

Andre Spitzer (German: [andˈreː ˈʃpɪtsɐ]; Hebrew: אנדרי שפיצר; 4 July 1945 – 6 September 1972) was an Israeli fencing master and coach of Israel's 1972 Summer Olympics team. He was one of 11 athletes and coaches taken hostage and subsequently killed by terrorists in the Munich massacre.

== Early life ==
Spitzer was born in Timișoara, Romania, on 4 July 1945, and was Jewish. His parents survived the Holocaust in Nazi forced labor camps. After his father died in 1956 when he was 11, Andre and his mother moved to Israel. He served in the Israeli Air Force and attended Israel's National Sport Academy, where he studied fencing.

In 1968, he was sent to the Netherlands for further instruction in fencing in The Hague with fencing master Abrahams. Most of his first year in the Netherlands he stayed with the Smitsloo family in Scheveningen. In 1971, he married one of his students, Ankie de Jongh, who converted to Judaism. Andre returned to Israel with his wife soon afterward where, at age 27, he became the country's top fencing instructor. The couple lived in Biranit, Israel, along the border with Lebanon. He helped found the National Fencing Academy, and became chief fencing instructor at the Wingate Institute.

The couple's daughter Anouk Yael was born two months before the Olympic Games.

== Munich Olympics ==
The Spitzers went to Munich with the rest of the Israeli team, but young Anouk was left in the Netherlands in the care of her grandparents.

Ankie Spitzer recalled her husband's idealism and attitude towards the Olympics:

(While strolling in the Olympic Village) ... he spotted members of the Lebanese team, and told (me) he was going to go and say hello to them... I said to him, "Are you out of your mind? They're from Lebanon!" Israel was in a state of war with Lebanon at the time. "Ankie," Andre said calmly, "that's exactly what the Olympics are all about. Here I can go to them, I can talk to them, I can ask them how they are. That's exactly what the Olympics are all about." So he went ... towards this Lebanese team, and ... he asked them "How were your results? I'm from Israel and how did it go?" And to my amazement, I saw that the (Lebanese) responded and they shook hands with him and they talked to him and they asked him about his results. I'll never forget, when he turned around and came back towards me with this huge smile on his face. "You see!" said Andre excitedly. "This is what I was dreaming about. I knew it was going to happen!" (Reeve (2001), pp. 52–53)

Midway through the Olympics, when the Israeli fencers had already competed, the Spitzers were summoned to the Netherlands – their daughter, who was with his wife's parents, had been hospitalized with an incessant bout of crying. After they arrived, they were told by the doctors that everything would be fine and that Andre could rejoin his teammates at the Olympics. Andre missed his train, but his wife drove him at breakneck speed to the station in Eindhoven, where he boarded the train without a ticket.

=== Terrorist attack and death ===
Spitzer returned to Munich about four hours before Palestinian members of Black September broke into the Israeli quarters, killed coach Moshe Weinberg and weightlifter Yossef Romano, and took Spitzer and eight of his teammates hostage. The terrorists announced that they wanted 234 other terrorists freed. The terrorists beat the hostages and castrated one of them, leaving him to bleed to death in front of his bound fellow hostages. Israeli Prime Minister Golda Meir called Spitzer's wife, and told her the Israeli government "would not negotiate with terror." Spitzer's wife asked, "Why not?" and Meir responded, "If we give in to their demands, no Jew will be safe anywhere in the world."

Israeli hostages Kehat Shorr (left) and Andre Spitzer (right) talk to German officials during the hostage crisis.

Spitzer was seen once during the hostage crisis, standing at a second-floor window in a white undershirt with his hands tied in front of him, talking to the German negotiators. Spitzer, the only hostage who spoke German and English as he learned it in his younger days, became the go-between with the German crisis team. At one point, when Spitzer tried to give the negotiators information that the terrorists did not want the negotiators to have about the killing and castration of fellow Israeli hostage Yossef Romano, one of the terrorists clubbed Spitzer in the head with the butt of an AK-47 assault rifle and pulled him roughly away from the window, back into the room. That was the last time most people saw Spitzer alive.

After 20 hours of tense negotiations, during which the hostages did not eat and were not allowed to use the bathroom, the hostages and terrorists were flown by helicopter to Fürstenfeldbruck Air Base from which, the terrorists believed, they would be flown by jet to a friendly Arab nation. Instead, the Bavarian border patrol and Munich police attempted an ill-prepared rescue operation, though 15 minutes before the terrorists arrived 17 West German police officers who had been tasked with ambushing the terrorists, dressed as pilots and stewards, took a vote, decided to abort their mission, and left their ambush. After a two-hour gunfight, Spitzer watched as four of his teammates were killed with machine guns, after which a grenade was detonated inside their helicopter. Seconds later, Spitzer and four more of his teammates were then fatally shot by the terrorists. Spitzer was 27 years old at the time. In all, 11 Israeli hostages were killed. Five of the terrorists and a West German police officer, Anton Fliegerbauer, were also killed in the gunfight.

During the hostage crisis (except for a short half-day break, after other athletes protested) and after the 11 athletes were killed, the International Olympic Committee (IOC) chose not to cancel the remainder of the Olympic Games, and they proceeded as planned.

One month later, the German government released the three surviving terrorists the Germans had captured and imprisoned who had committed the Munich massacre, as demanded by terrorists who hijacked Lufthansa Flight 615 on 29 October. In the immediate aftermath of the hijacking of as well as on a number of later occasions, concerns were voiced that the event might have been staged or at least tolerated by the West German government in order to "get rid of three murderers, which had become a security burden" (as Amnon Rubinstein wrote in Israeli newspaper Haaretz under the headline "Bonn's Disgrace" shortly after the prisoner release).

== Aftermath ==
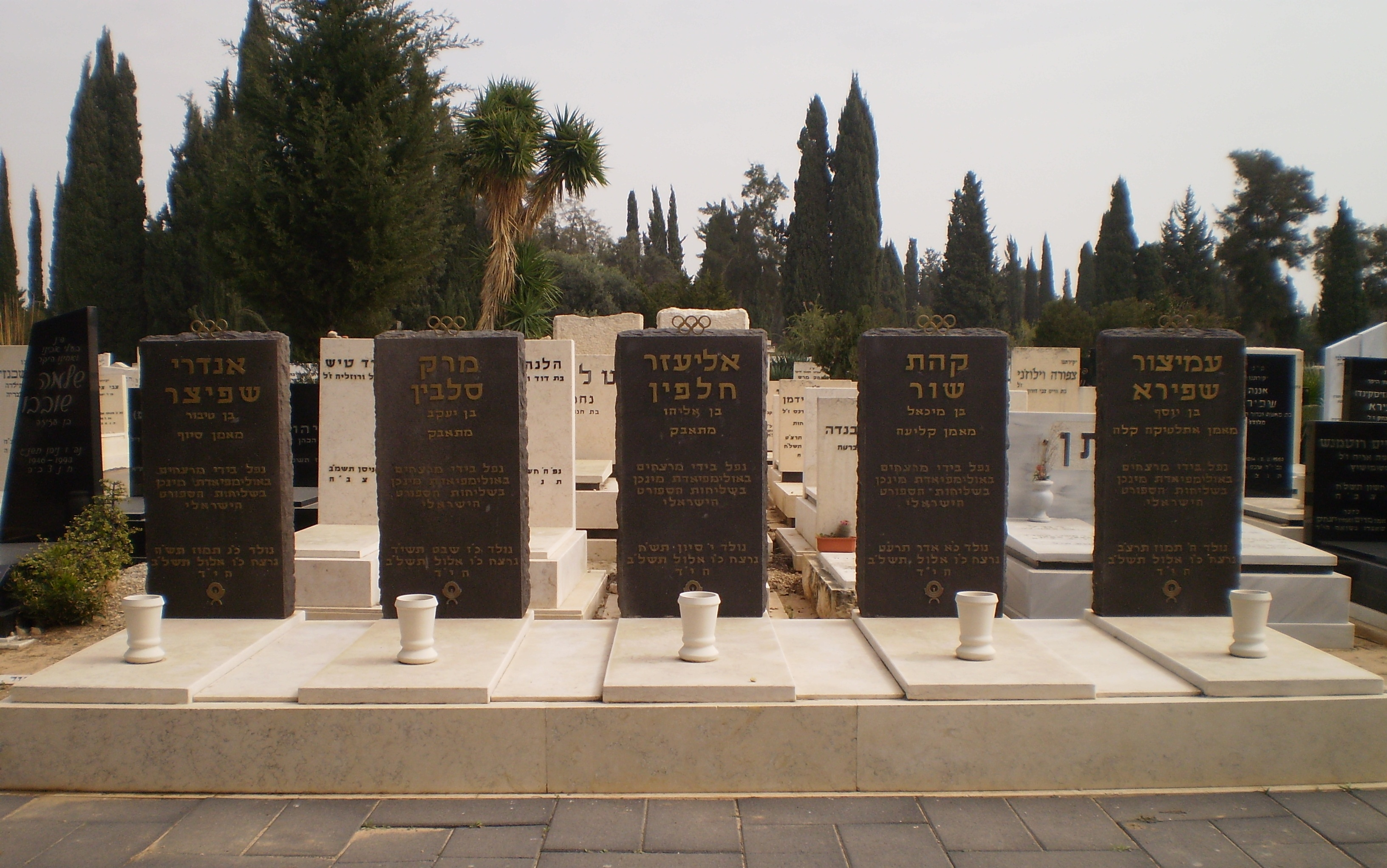
Graves of five of the victims of the Munich Massacre at Kiryat Shaul Cemetery

Spitzer was buried alongside teammates Amitzur Shapira, Kehat Shorr, Eliezer Halfin, and Mark Slavin at Kiryat Shaul Cemetery in Tel Aviv, Israel.

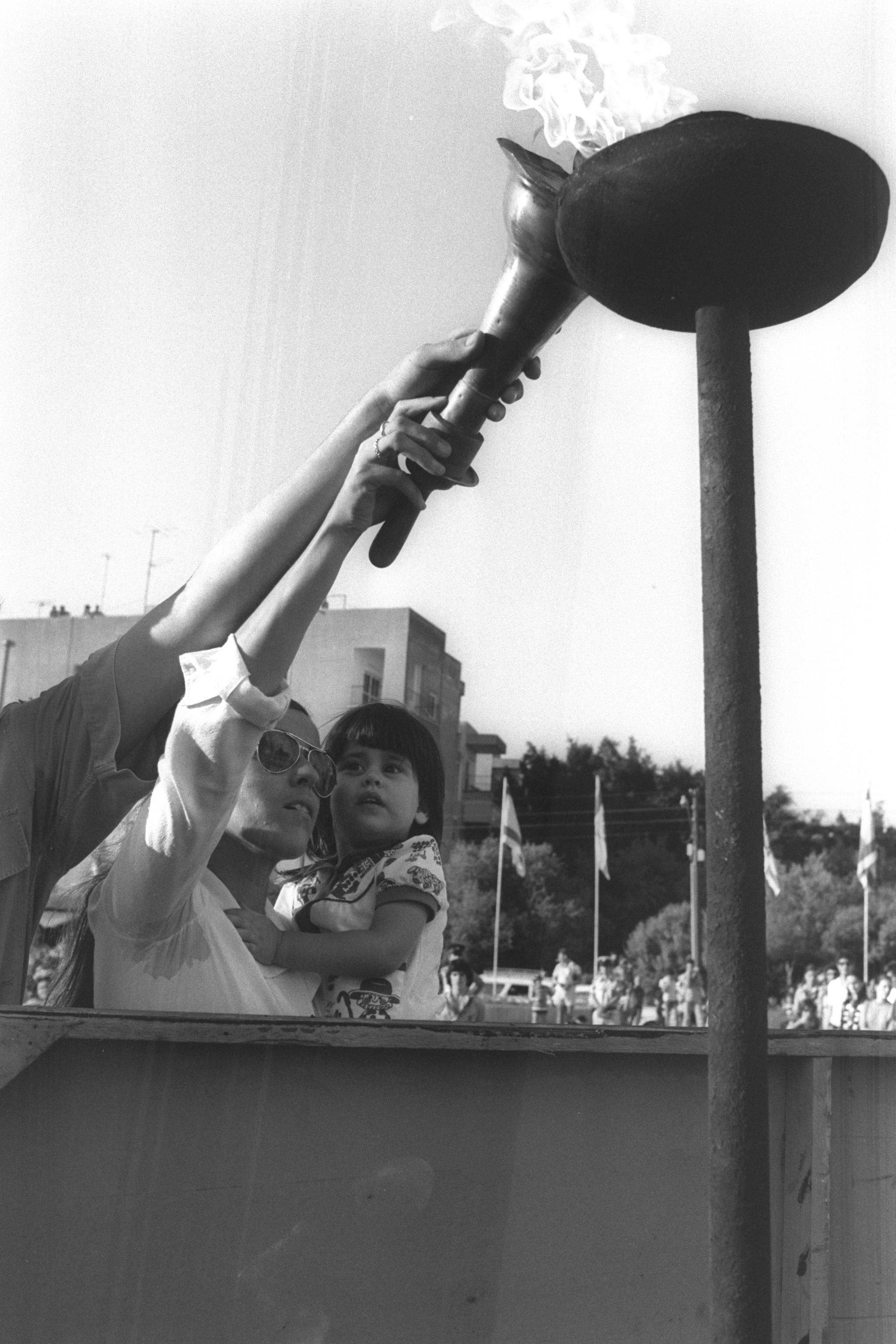
Ankie Spitzer, the widow of Andre Spitzer, holds her daughter while lighting the torch during a memorial ceremony on Yud Alef Square (1974).

Despite having no family in Israel and knowing little Hebrew, Ankie Spitzer decided to remain in Israel with her daughter, and later converted to Judaism. Ankie explained that she thought that if she returned to Amsterdam to raise her daughter, "I would never be able to explain to Anouk what her father was about. She would always be an exception there. Here, she would fit in".

Ankie Spitzer confirmed that during Mossad assassinations following the Munich massacre, a covert operation by Mossad (Israeli external intelligence), authorized by Israeli Prime Minister Golda Meir, to track down and kill the Black September and Palestine Liberation Organization (PLO) perpetrators and masterminds of the Munich massacre, Mossad officials regularly called her home to inform her whenever a target was killed. Ankie said that she drew no satisfaction, and would have preferred for the terrorists to have been put on trial: "It didn't fill me with joy to think, 'Oh, great, now they're revenging Andre', because I never looked for that revenge. I don't live for revenge, I live for justice".

In 1980, Ankie Spitzer married Elie Rekhess, a professor at Tel Aviv University, and is now known as Ankie Rekhess-Spitzer. She led the fight to get the German government to admit their culpability in the failed rescue of Andre and the others. In 2003, after relatives of the killed Olympians brought a lawsuit against the German government charging the government with gross misconduct and gross mismanagement in its handling of the crisis, the Germans paid a financial settlement to the families of the Munich victims. Today Ankie Spitzer is a correspondent in Israel covering the Middle East for Dutch and Belgian television.

Ankie Spitzer for years has sought to have the International Olympic Committee designate a minute of silence at the Opening Ceremony of an Olympic Games for the 11 Olympians who had been killed in Munich, but her request had always been denied until the delayed 2020 Olympic Games in Tokyo.

Andre Spitzer has been portrayed by Ori Pfeffer in Munich and Pasquale Aleardi in Munich 72: Das Attentat.

== See also ==
- List of select Jewish fencers
- One minute of silence
