= Ali Hassan Salameh =

Palestinian militant (1941–1979)

- علي حسن سلامة
- Ali Hassan Salameh
- Born: 1 April 1941; Qula, Mandatory Palestine
- Died: 22 January 1979 (aged 37); Beirut, Lebanon
- Spouse(s): Um Hassan; Georgina Rizk
- Relatives: Hassan Salameh (father)
- Military career
- Allegiance: PLO; Black September
- Service years: 1958–1979
- Rank: Chief of operations
- Nickname: Red Prince
- Unit: Force 17
- Conflicts: Munich massacre, Sabena Flight 571

Ali Hassan Salameh (Arabic: علي حسن سلامة, ʿAlī Ḥasan Salāmah; 1 April 1941 – 22 January 1979) was a Palestinian militant who was the chief of operations for the Black September Organization and founder of Force 17. He was assassinated in January 1979 as part of an assassination campaign by Mossad.

== Biography ==
Ali Hassan Salameh was born on 1 April 1941 in Qula, Mandatory Palestine to a wealthy family. He was the son of Shaykh Hassan Salameh, who was killed in action by the Israeli army during the 1948 Palestine war near Lydda. Ali Salameh was educated in Germany and is thought to have received his military training in Cairo and Moscow.

He was known for flaunting his wealth, being surrounded by women and driving sports cars, and having popular appeal among Palestinian young men; his nickname underlined his popularity—the "Red Prince" (Arabic: الأمير الاحمر). He served as the security chief of Fatah. After the Munich massacre during the 1972 Olympic Games, he was hunted by the Israeli Mossad during its assassination campaign. In 1973, Mossad agents killed an innocent Moroccan waiter, Ahmed Bouchiki, in what became known as the Lillehammer affair in Norway, mistaking Bouchiki for Salameh, and resulting in the arrest of some of the Israeli agents.

As a result of the failure in Lillehammer and his alleged CIA protection, Salameh felt relatively safe. Having lived under cover in various parts of the Middle East and Europe, in 1978, he married Georgina Rizk, a Lebanese celebrity who had been Miss Universe seven years earlier. The couple spent their honeymoon in Hawaii and then stayed at Disneyland in California. When Rizk became pregnant, she returned to her flat in Beirut where Salameh also rented a separate apartment. Rizk was six months pregnant at the time of his death. Their son Ali Salameh is a political science graduate who studied in Canada. By a prior marriage he was a grandson-in-law of Mohammad Amin al-Husayni. He had two sons from his first marriage to Um Hassan.

Salameh served as the key bridge between the Palestine Liberation Organisation (PLO) and the Central Intelligence Agency (CIA) from 1970 until his death after being recruited as a CIA asset by Robert Ames. The PLO, at the request of the US, had undertaken steps to help ensure the security of both the US Embassy—Salameh responded by posting a PLO guard unit there—and, more generally, American citizens resident in Lebanon. The contacts later developed more extensively as the PLO offered its intelligence assistance in regard to larger regional issues. The US had undertaken with Israel to avoid contacts with the PLO, but US security interests under Gerald Ford, on the advice of Henry Kissinger, enabled an unofficial relationship which, when discovered by Israel, deeply disturbed Israeli officials. When asked by the Israelis, US officials denied the relationship. The desire to disrupt the channels between the US and the PLO was one of the motivations behind his assassination.

Salameh received dozens of CIA alerts of the Mossad's intention to assassinate him. The CIA provided him with encrypted communications equipment and considered sending him an armored car. He was also warned by the CIA that his practice of driving around Beirut in convoys of vehicles carrying bodyguards left him vulnerable to an Israeli assassination.

== Assassination ==
In June 1978, the Mossad intensified its efforts to assassinate Salameh, codenamed Operation Maveer (Burner). Michael Harari was in charge of the operation. A Lebanese agent working for Israeli military intelligence supplied key details on Salameh's routine. Mossad operatives were subsequently deployed to Beirut to monitor Salameh, one of whom enrolled at the gym where he regularly exercised and befriended him. As many as fourteen Mossad agents were involved in the operation. One of the agents believed to be involved was Erika Chambers, who arrived in Beirut in October 1978 posing as an NGO staffer wishing to assist Palestinian orphans. She rented a flat overlooking Salameh's apartment. Two other agents involved in the operation using the aliases Peter Scriver and Roland Kolberg entered Lebanon on British and Canadian passports, respectively.

From October 1978, over a period of six weeks, Mossad agents observed Salameh, noting that he spent most afternoons with Rizk at her apartment in Snoubra, West Beirut, and when not in meetings spent time at the gym and at a sauna. An initial plan to kill him with a bomb attack at the sauna was vetoed for fear of excessive civilian casualties. The Mossad decided to kill him with a car bomb. Explosives were placed in the trunk of a Volkswagen which was then parked close to Salameh's apartment block.

On 22 January 1979, Salameh was in a convoy of two Chevrolet station wagons headed from Rizk's flat to his mother's for a birthday party. Chambers was on her balcony painting, with the Volkswagen parked below on Rue Verdun (an upscale commercial and residential street in Beirut). As Salameh's convoy passed the Volkswagen at 3:35 pm and turned onto Rue Madame Curie, 100 kg of explosive attached to the car by a fellow Mossad agent was remotely exploded, either by Chambers or on her signal to another Mossad agent. Harari watched the explosion through a telescope from an Israeli Navy missile boat off the coast of Beirut.

The detonation left Salameh conscious, but severely wounded and in great pain, having pieces of steel shrapnel embedded in his head and throughout his body. He was rushed to the American University of Beirut, where he died on the operating table at 4:03 p.m. Salameh's four bodyguards were also killed in the explosion. Four bystanders were also killed. In addition, at least 16 people were injured in the blast. Immediately following the operation, the Mossad agents involved in the operation left the country. Chambers and two other agents were picked up by boat on the Beirut shore and taken to an Israeli missile boat.

=== Funeral ===
Salameh was buried in Beirut after a public funeral ceremony attended by Yasser Arafat and about 20,000 Palestinians on 24 January 1979.

== In popular culture ==
- Ali Hassan Salameh was featured in the plot of the Steven Spielberg film Munich as one of the assassination targets. He is seen twice portrayed by Mehdi Nebbou, but was not assassinated until after the events of the film.
- He appears as the character named Jamal Ramlawi in the spy novel Agents of Innocence by David Ignatius, a thinly disguised account of his recruitment by the CIA.
- He is briefly mentioned in the Robert Ludlum novel The Janson Directive, where his alleged links to the CIA are cited as an example of shady deals the United States makes.
- Daniel Silva borrowed from the exploits of Ali Hassan Salameh and his relatives to create the background for his fictional spy novel Prince of Fire, 2005.
- Ali Hassan Salameh is repeatedly referenced in the book By Way of Deception by Victor Ostrovsky in his account of his own recruitment and training to become an officer in Mossad.
- Salameh is played by Daniel Alfie and is centrally featured as a target in the 1986 Canadian made for TV film Sword of Gideon, an earlier production that tells essentially the same story and which used the same source material as Speilberg's later theatrical film Munich.

== Bibliography ==
- Bar-Zohar, Michael; Eitan Haber (1983). The Quest for The Red Prince: The Israeli Hunt for Ali Hassen Salameh the PLO leader who masterminded the Olympic Games Massacre. Weidenfeld & Nicolson. ISBN 978-0-297-78063-2. which includes black-and-white photographic plates and which also include Yasser Arafat, together with an index.
- Michael Bar Bar-Zohar and Eitan Haber (1 December 2005). Massacre in Munich: The Manhunt for the Killers Behind the 1972 Olympics Massacre. The Lyons Press. ISBN 978-1592289455.

== See also ==
- Yuval Aviv
