= Jamal Al-Gashey =

Palestinian militant (born 1953)

- Born: 1953 (age 72–73); Shatila refugee camp, Lebanon
- Occupation: Member of Black September
- Known for: Participating in the 1972 Munich massacre

Jamal Al-Gashey (Arabic: جمال الجاشي; born 1953) is a Palestinian militant who was a member of the Black September offshoot of the Palestine Liberation Organization and one of eight militants who carried out the massacre of eleven Israeli athletes during the 1972 Summer Olympics in Munich, West Germany. He is visible several times in television news footage of the event, identifiable by his blue- and white-striped jacket. During the failed rescue attempt by the Munich police, which resulted in the deaths of nine Israeli hostages and five of the Black September militants, Al-Gashey was shot in the wrist attempting to aid a fellow Black September member.

== Early life ==
In interviews, Al-Gashey has said that he was brought up in conditions of great poverty, mostly in the Shatila refugee camp in Lebanon. His family was displaced in the 1948 Arab–Israeli War but always had a desire to return. Al-Gashey said that living in squalor and relying on handouts while Israelis were living on his ancestral land fostered his hatred for Israel, which led him to join the PLO in 1967. He said that during his initial training, for the first time, he felt "truly Palestinian ...not just a wretched refugee, but a revolutionary fighting for a cause."

== Role in the Munich massacre ==
In July 1972, Al-Gashey was one of several young Black September members recruited for what he referred to as "special training", without having any idea what their target might be. He flew to Munich at the end of August 1972, staying in a hotel and even attending a few Olympic events. On the night of 4 September, Al-Gashey met for dinner with the other members of the strike team, along with a senior Black September operative (believed to be Abu Daoud), who briefed them on their upcoming mission and drove with them in taxis to the Olympic Village. Al-Gashey claims that until that dinner meeting, he had no clue that the team's target was to be the Israeli Olympians.

Although charged with multiple crimes related to the massacre, Al-Gashey and his surviving compatriots never stood trial. Nearly eight weeks after the massacre, on 29 October, Lufthansa Flight 615 was hijacked by two Black September members, who demanded the release of the three Munich survivors. The jailed fedayeen were subsequently released by the West German government. When they landed in Libya, they were interviewed, with footage of this press conference being shown in the film One Day in September. Jamal Al-Gashey can be seen seated in the middle of the three, between his cousin Adnan (believed to be the guerilla who shot and killed five of the hostages who were tied up in one of the helicopters) and Mohammed Safady. When asked directly if he had killed any of the Israelis, Adnan Al-Gashey simply replied, "It's not important for me to say if I killed Israeli (sic) or not."

== Later life ==
It is believed that Al-Gashey has spent the time since his release in hiding in North Africa. He is married and has two daughters. He is the only member of the group to consent to interviews, having given a brief statement in 1992 to a Palestinian journalist. In 1999, Al-Gashey emerged from hiding to give a more in-depth interview in the film One Day in September. Since he believed that Israeli agents were still trying to kill him, he was disguised and his face shown only in blurry shadow as a precaution. Director Kevin Macdonald noted Al-Gashey's edgy, almost paranoid behaviour throughout the interview, but was able to convince him that the film he was working on would only be authentic if Al-Gashey gave his side of the story. During the 1999 interview, he explained,

I'm proud of what I did at Munich because it helped the Palestinian cause enormously...before Munich, the world had no idea about our struggle, but on that day, the name of 'Palestine' was repeated all around the world.

== See also ==
- Mossad assassinations following the Munich massacre
- List of people who disappeared
- List of hostage crises
