= 1972 Israeli air raid in Syria and Lebanon =

Military incident

- Part of Operation Wrath of God (Palestinian insurgency in South Lebanon)
Date	8 September 1972
Location	Palestinian refugee camps in Syria and Lebanon
Result	Israeli victory

Belligerents
Israel	(Palestine Liberation Organization) PLO

Casualties and losses
None	65–200 killed

On 8 September 1972, Israeli planes bombed ten Palestine Liberation Organization (PLO) bases in Syria and Lebanon as a response to the Munich massacre that took place on 6 September, perpetrated by Black September, a Palestinian terrorist organization active since 1970. Estimates of the number and identity of casualties vary widely, with several sources giving a figure as high as 200 militants and 11 Lebanese civilians. Seven bases were attacked in Syria and three in Lebanon. A short dogfight between Israeli and Syrian fighters resulted in three Syrian jets being downed. The main rail link between Syria and Beirut was cut and targets in Latakia were also attacked.

On 11 September, a UN Security Council resolution demanding a halt to Israeli raids was vetoed by the United States, after the Soviet Union and China had vetoed amendments that would have also applied the resolution to terrorist activities.

On 16 September, three Israeli armored columns crossed into southern Lebanon, with air support, to search for PLO bases. It destroyed at least 130 houses suspected of housing PLO militants. 45 militants were killed in this operation and 16 were captured.

== See also ==
- Mossad assassinations following the Munich massacre
- 1973 Israeli raid on Lebanon
