= Lufthansa Flight 649 =

German passenger plane hijacked in 1972

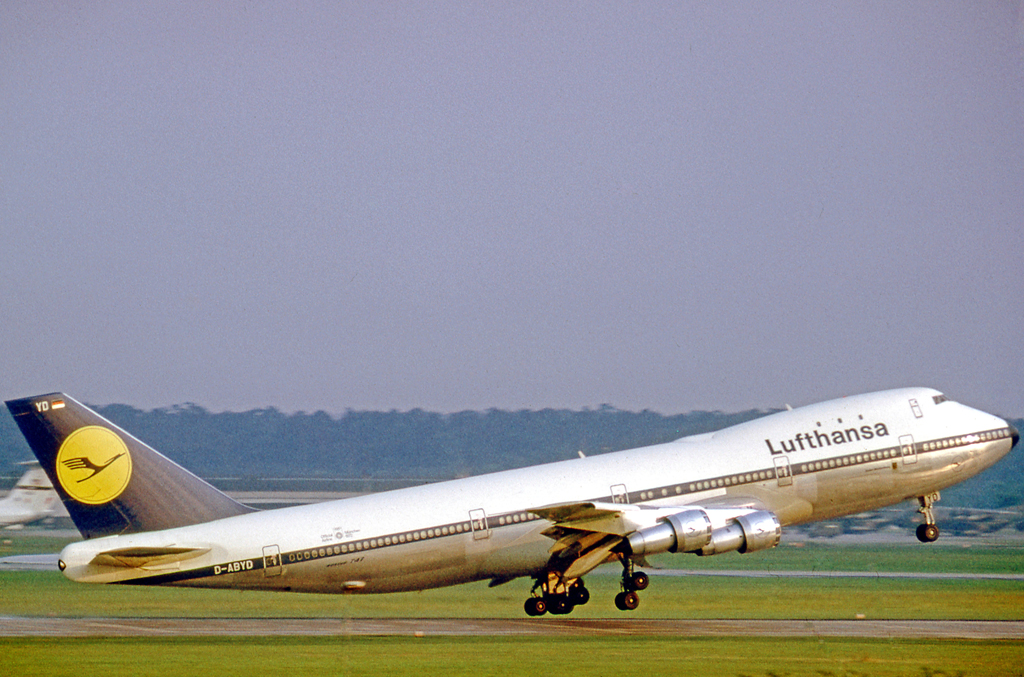
- D-ABYD, the aircraft involved in the hijacking, in June 1972

Hijacking
- Date: 22–23 February 1972
- Summary: Hijacking
- Site: Aden International Airport, South Yemen

Aircraft
- Aircraft type: Boeing 747-230B (Note: The aircraft was a Boeing 747-200B model ("B" is passenger variant); Boeing assigns a unique code for each company that buys one of its aircraft, which is applied as an infix to the model number at the time the aircraft is built, hence "747-230B" designates a 747-200B built for Lufthansa Airlines (customer code 30).)
- Aircraft name: Baden-Württemberg
- Operator: Lufthansa
- IATA flight No.: LH649
- ICAO flight No.: DLH649
- Call sign: LUFTHANSA 649
- Registration: D-ABYD
- Flight origin: Haneda Airport, Tokyo, Japan
- 1st stopover: Kai Tak Airport, British Hong Kong
- 2nd stopover: Don Mueang International Airport, Bangkok, Thailand
- 3rd stopover: Indira Gandhi International Airport, New Delhi, India
- Last stopover: Ellinikon International Airport, Athens, Greece
- Destination: Frankfurt Airport, Frankfurt, West Germany
- Passengers: 177 (including 5 hijackers)
- Crew: 15
- Fatalities: 0
- Injuries: 0
- Survivors: 192

The hijacking of Lufthansa Flight 649 was an aircraft hijacking that took place between 22 and 23 February 1972. Eventually, all hostages on board the seized Boeing 747-230B were released when the West German government paid a ransom of US$5 million. The aircraft was hijacked by unknown men.

== Hijacking ==
Flight 649 was a scheduled Lufthansa service on the Tokyo-Hong Kong-Bangkok-Delhi-Athens-Frankfurt route, which was operated once a week, leaving Tokyo-Haneda Airport on Monday afternoons and arriving at Frankfurt Airport the next morning. On Tuesday, 22 February 1972, the Boeing 747-200 serving the flight (registered D-ABYD) was hijacked by five men who were armed with guns and explosives. The initial assault happened at around 1:00 a.m., half an hour after the aircraft with 172 other passengers and 15 crew members had departed Delhi-Palam Airport in Delhi bound for Ellinikon International Airport in Athens.

The hijackers identified themselves as part of a previously-unknown group, the Organisation for Resisting Zionist Persecution. Subsequent reports claimed that they were in fact acting as members of the Popular Front for the Liberation of Palestine (PFLP). They had reportedly boarded the flight at different airports: one at Hong Kong-Kai Tak, two at Bangkok-Don Muang, and two at Delhi-Palam.

Initially, the pilot was ordered to land the 747 at an unprepared airstrip in the Arabian Desert. Once the hijackers learned that the Lufthansa crew considered such a manoeuvre to be too dangerous, they agreed on heading to Aden International Airport instead, in what was then South Yemen. Once having landed there, all women and children among the passengers were released, as well as one female flight attendant.

A few hours after the hijacking had commenced, a note was received at the Lufthansa headquarters in Cologne: the aircraft would be blown up by 9:00 a.m. on the following day if a ransom of US$5 million had not been paid by then. The handing-over was to take place near Beirut, according to the detailed instructions on the note. The West German government (at the time, Lufthansa was a state-owned company) decided to fully comply with the demands, without any bargaining.

On 23 February, once the hijackers had been informed that the ransom had indeed been paid, the male passengers (among them Joseph Kennedy, the then 19-year-old son of Robert F. Kennedy) were allowed to leave the hijacked aircraft and board the Boeing 707 Lufthansa had flown to Aden to pick them up with, but this aircraft also had to stay on the ground for another three hours. The remaining 14 Lufthansa crew members remained as hostages inside the jumbo jet, and were eventually released in the evening.

Though it was planned to keep the exact amount of money secret in order to not attract copycats, the sum was disclosed to the public on 25 February by Georg Leber, then Federal Minister for Transport. According to a spokesman of the International Air Transport Association (IATA), at that time this marked the biggest ransom ever paid for an aircraft.

== Aftermath and political background ==
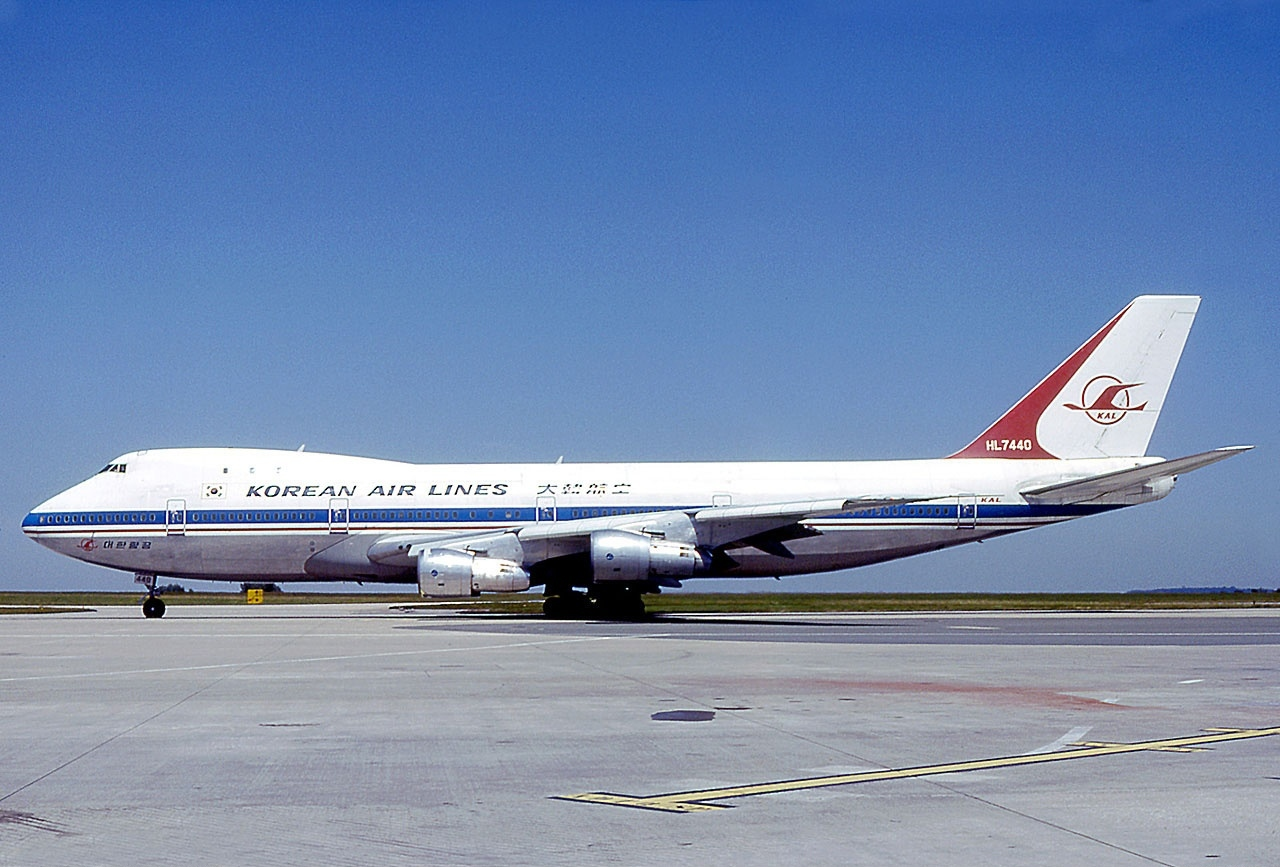
The Boeing 747 involved in the hijacking, with new operator Korean Air Lines and registration HL7440.

Once all hostages of Flight 649 were set free, the hijackers surrendered to the South Yemeni authorities. On 27 February, they were released again without having been charged with any criminal offenses, likely in exchange for $1 million of the ransom. Thus, the perpetrators could never be reliably identified. West German news magazine Der Spiegel speculated that the remainder of the ransom had been used by the PFLP to fund the Japanese attackers responsible for the Lod Airport massacre, which took place on 30 May 1972.

The hijacking of Lufthansa Flight 649 marked the first such event in the history of the airline and the beginning of a series of Palestinian acts of violence involving West Germany during 1972, most notably the hostage crisis during the Munich Summer Olympics and the subsequent hijacking of Lufthansa Flight 615. Israel claimed that by complying with the demands of the attackers in all of those events, the West German government had "surrendered to terrorism". This accusation was combined with allegations of appeasement efforts towards the Arab–Israeli conflict. In 1977, when Lufthansa Flight 181 (the Landshut) was hijacked, the Germans stormed it with special forces of GSG 9, rather than negotiating with the Palestinian hijackers.
