= Hippopotamus (restaurant) =

French restaurant chain

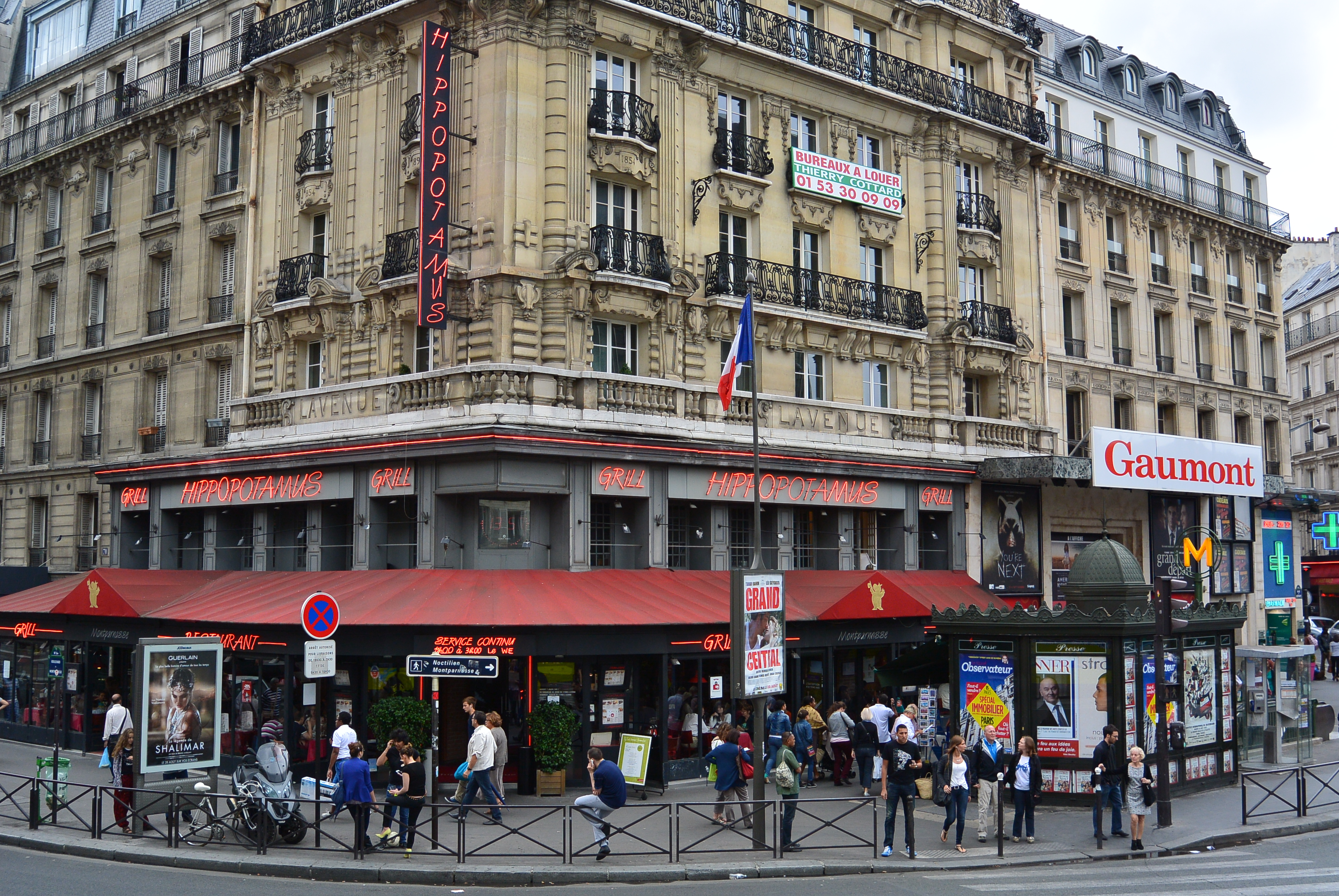
Hippopotamus restaurant in Paris

Hippopotamus is a French chain of grill restaurants with a hippopotamus as its logo. The brand is owned by Groupe FLO. It is open daily from 11:00am to 1:00am. As of November 2025, Hippopotamus has 99 locations worldwide in France and Ivory Coast.

== History ==
In mid-1968, Christian Guignard opened his first grill restaurant near the Champs-Élysées in Paris. The restaurant served prime rib on a thick wooden board with matchstick fries. Changes such as vegetarian dishes, Braille menus, and sides of green beans were later added.

In February 1992, Group Flo led by Jean-Paul Bucher bought the assets of Hippopotamus.
