= Ronen Bergman =

Israeli investigative journalist

- רונן ברגמן
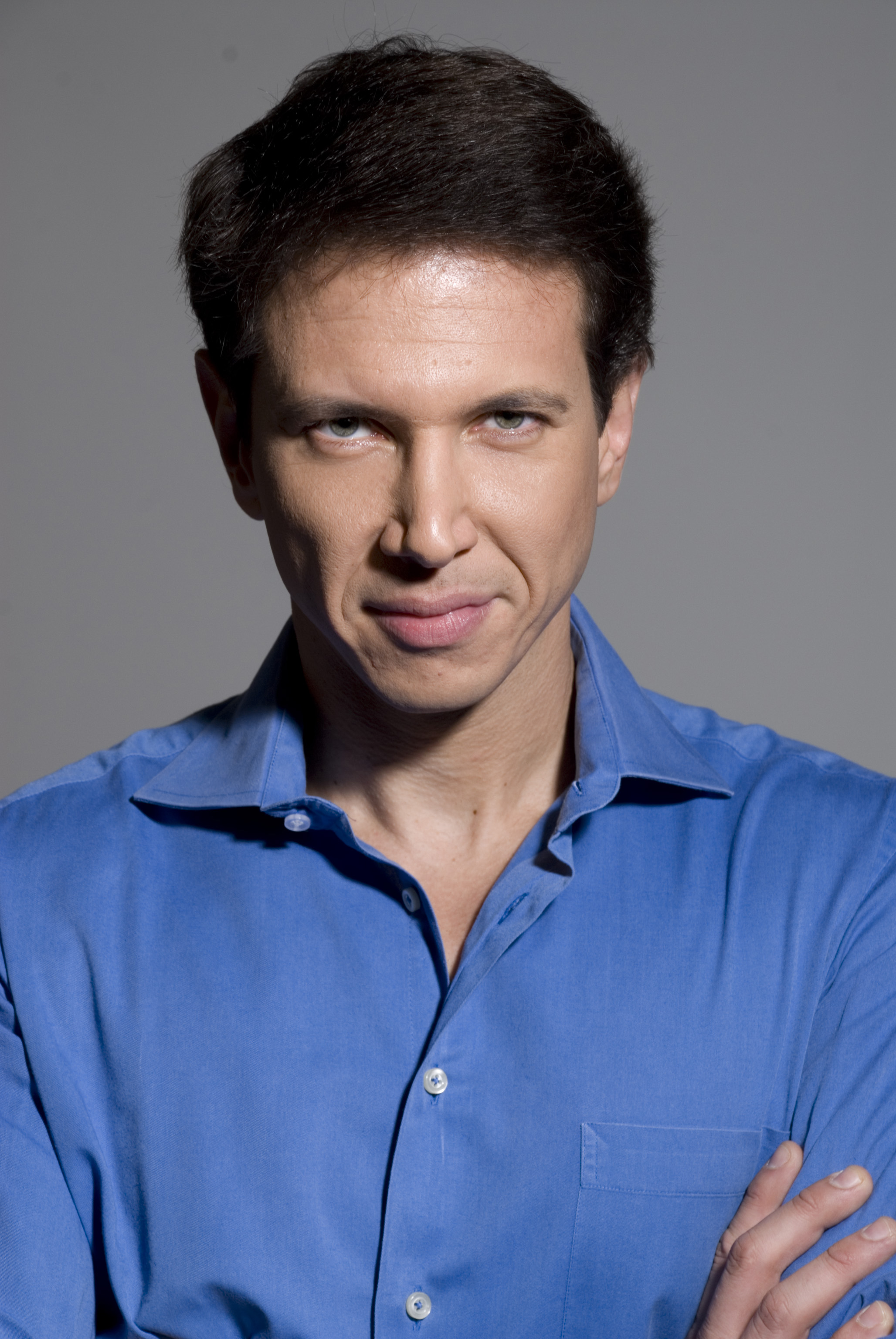
- Bergman in 2008
- Education: University of Haifa (LLB); Corpus Christi College, Cambridge (MPhil, PhD)
- Occupation: Journalist
- Writing career
- Genre: Investigative journalism
- Notable work: Rise and Kill First (2018)
- Notable awards: Contributed towards the New York Times winning the Pulitzer Prize for International Reporting in 2024
- Website: ronenbergman.com

Ronen Bergman (Hebrew: רונן ברגמן) is an Israeli investigative journalist and author. He is a staff writer for The New York Times Magazine, based in Tel Aviv, and a senior political and military analyst for Yedioth Ahronoth.

He previously wrote for Haaretz.

His work contributed to The New York Times ' 2024 Pulitzer Prize win for its coverage of the Gaza war.

== Biography ==
Bergman's parents were both Holocaust survivors.

Bergman did his military service in the Israel Defense Forces in the intelligence unit of the Military Police Corps. After his military service, he studied law at the University of Haifa, graduated cum laude, and was admitted to the Israel Bar Association. He later studied at Corpus Christi College, Cambridge, in the United Kingdom, where he received a Master of Philosophy in international relations and a PhD in history. His PhD thesis was titled "Israel and Africa: military and intelligence liaisons".

== Career as a journalist ==
Bergman has written in the weekly HaOlam HaZeh, in Shoken network locales and in Haaretz, and since 2000 he has been writing in the "7 Days" supplement of Yedioth Ahronoth, and is a part of the editorial team of the newspaper.

Bergman is an expert on intelligence, security, terrorism and the Middle East. He is a lecturer at various forums in Israel and the United States. During his career, he has exposed a number of scandals, including failures at the Abu Kabir Forensic Institute, Nahum Manbar's connections to the Iranian arms industry, Yasser Arafat's secret bank account, the case of the broken smallpox vaccines prepared for the Gulf War, and Teddy Kollek's connections with British intelligence.

A topic that Bergman dealt with for many years was the senior Egyptian source who reported the plans for the Yom Kippur War to the head of the Mossad, Zvi Zamir, and was nicknamed "Babylon" by Bergman. Following Bergman's and other journalists' exposure, it became known that the man was Ashraf Marwan.

In 2018, Bergman joined The New York Times Magazine as a staff writer after having been a contributing writer to the magazine for several years. He serves as one of The New York Times's correspondents in Tel Aviv and covers the Middle East.

== Books ==
- Authority Granted, 2002
- Moment of Truth, 2003
- Point Of No Return, 2007
- The Secret War With Iran, 2008
- By Any Means Necessary, 2009
- Operation Red Falcon, 2015
- Rise and Kill First: The Secret History of Israel's Targeted Assassinations, 2018

== Awards and recognition ==
Bergman won several journalism awards:

- 1995 B'nai B'rith Worlds Center Award for Journalism
- 1996 Haaretz award for Best Story.
- 2017 Sokolov Prize for "a series of important and courageous journalistic exposures starting from what was done at the Abu Kabir Forensic Institute to the scandal of the dangerous vaccines against smallpox, the disclosure of the communication tapes of the Yom Kippur War and the recent conversations with the former head of the Mossad Meir Dagan."
- 2017 Paul Harris prize.
- 2021 special commendation by the Asian Media Owners Association.
- Member of The New York Times team which won the 2024 Pulitzer Prize for International Reporting for a series of investigations and revelations related to the Gaza war.
