= Donald Macintyre (journalist) =

British journalist on The Independent

- Education: Christ Church, Oxford, Cardiff School of Journalism
- Occupation: Journalist for The Independent

Donald Macintyre is a British freelance journalist and author, formerly a political editor and foreign correspondent on The Independent.

== Education ==
Macintyre was educated at Bradfield College and Christ Church, Oxford, and obtained a post-graduate diploma from the Cardiff School of Journalism, under Tom Hopkinson.

== Journalism career ==
After working at the Birmingham Sunday Mercury, Macintyre moved to the Daily Express as an industrial reporter, subsequently becoming Labour Editor at The Sunday Times and The Times.

As Labour Editor at The Times, he did not go to Wapping when Rupert Murdoch transferred production there in January 1986, later that year joining The Independent before its launch with his two fellow NUJ "refuseniks" on the labour staff, David Felton and Barrie Clement. He joined The Sunday Telegraph as Political Editor in 1987, leaving it for the short-lived Sunday Correspondent in 1990 before joining first The Independent on Sunday and then The Independent as Political Editor (1993–96), Chief Political Commentator (1996–2004) and Parliamentary Sketchwriter and columnist (2012–2015).

Macintyre was the Jerusalem Bureau Chief for The Independent (2004–12), mainly covering Israel and the Occupied Palestinian Territories but also travelling to Iraq, Turkey, Egypt, Yemen, Jordan and Libya for the newspaper.

== Prizes ==
- 2011 Next Century Foundation's Peace Through Media Award

== Publications ==
Books

- Talking about Trade Unions, Wayland, 29 November 1979; ISBN 978-0853402237
- (Co-author) Strike: Thatcher, Scargill and the Miners Peter Wilsher, Donald Macintyre and Michael Jones Deutsch, September 1985, ISBN 0 233 97825 9
- Mandelson: And the Making of New Labour, HarperCollins; New Edition (18 September 2000), ISBN 0-00-653062-1
- Gaza: Preparing for Dawn, October 2017, ISBN 1786071061
