= Michael Harari =

Israeli intelligence officer (1927–2014), involved in the failed Lillehammer affair

- מייק הררי
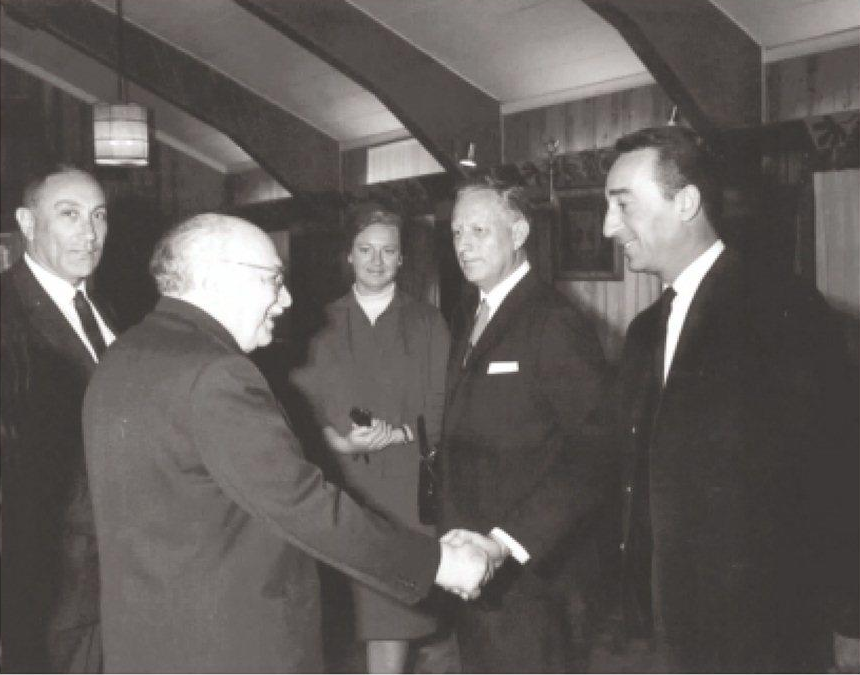
- From right to left: Michael Harari, Wolfgang Lotz and his wife, Zalman Shazar, and Meir Amit
- Born: February 18, 1927; Tel Aviv, Mandatory Palestine
- Died: September 21, 2014 (aged 87); Tel Aviv, Israel
- Occupation: Intelligence officer
- Employer: Mossad
- Known for: Failed Lillehammer affair Rescue of hostages at Entebbe

Michael Harari (Hebrew: מייק הררי; February 18, 1927 – September 21, 2014) was an Israeli intelligence officer in the Mossad. He was notably involved in the Lillehammer affair, an attempted revenge killing following the Munich massacre that instead resulted in the murder of an innocent individual in a case of mistaken identity. He was later involved in Operation Entebbe.

== Early life ==
Harari was born in Tel Aviv in Mandatory Palestine in 1927. At age 13, he joined the Haganah, and acted as a courier carrying messages between different units. In 1943, he joined the Palmach, the elite strike force of the Haganah, and participated in a 1945 raid on the Atlit detention camp which freed 208 Jewish hostages held by the British authorities as illegal immigrants, and the Night of the Bridges. He was arrested by the British authorities several times, and was eventually sent to the Palyam and transferred to Europe to help facilitate illegal Jewish immigration to Palestine.

== Career ==
Following independence, he then spent time in the Israel Defense Forces and Shin Bet before being recruited by the Mossad in the 1960s. During his time in the Mossad, he ran agents in Europe, eventually advancing to the head of the Operations Branch. It was during this time that he helped build and lead teams in a series of assassinations of Palestinians believed to be responsible for the Munich Massacre in 1972. In what became known as the Lillehammer affair, Harari led a team into Norway where they believed Ali Hassan Salameh, the chief of Black September operations was living. After identifying and assassinating the target, it was revealed that they had killed an innocent waiter, Ahmed Bouchiki, who only resembled Salameh. While authorities arrested many of Harari's team, he escaped back to Israel. A Norwegian case against him was dismissed in January 1999 because of a lack of evidence.

Despite this setback, Harari later scored two major successes for the Mossad. Before Operation Entebbe was launched in July 1976, to free Israeli hostages at Entebbe International Airport, Harari supposedly took the disguise of an Italian businessman to enter and reconnoiter the airport. He also helped facilitate the use of Kenyan air bases to refuel Israeli planes returning from the rescue mission. In January 1979, Harari led a team that killed Ali Hassan Salameh in Beirut with a car bomb, the same man he had tried to assassinate in Lillehammer years earlier. The blast also killed four innocent bystanders, including a British student and a German nun, and injured 18 other people in the vicinity.

At some later point in time, Harari became the Mossad station chief of Latin America, but based in Israel. Although he is said to have retired after this service, it is unclear if all his Israeli intelligence connections were severed when he left for Panama. He returned to Israel just before or during the 1989 United States invasion of Panama, which deposed Manuel Noriega and installed the legitimate presidential victor, Guillermo Endara. Harari later appeared on Israeli television and denied that he was ever a close advisor of Noriega. He also said that he had escaped by his own means. Harari was played by actor Moshe Ivgy in Steven Spielberg's 2005 film Munich, which depicts the Mossad assassinations following the Munich massacre.

Harari died at his home on September 21, 2014, at the age of 87.
