= Basil Al Kubaisi =

Iraqi academic and politician (1934–1973)

- Born: Basil Raouf Al Kubaisi; 1934; Baghdad, Kingdom of Iraq
- Died: 6 April 1973 (aged 38–39); Paris, France
- Cause of death: Assassination
- Burial place: Baghdad, Iraq
- Education: Adams State University; Howard University; American University
- Occupation: Academic
- Spouse: Nadia Al Khudairi
- Children: 3

Academic background
- Thesis: Arab Nationalist Movement 1951-1971: From Pressure Group to Socialist Party (1971)

Academic work
- Discipline: Political science
- Institutions: American University of Beirut; University of Calgary

Basil Al Kubaisi (Arabic: باسل الكبيسي; 1934 – 6 April 1973) was an Iraqi nationalist activist and academic who was assassinated by the Mossad agents in Paris on 6 April 1973. He was one of the members of the Popular Front for the Liberation of Palestine (PFLP).

== Early life and education ==
Al Kubaisi was born in Baghdad in 1934. He hailed from an affluent Sunni Muslim family. His father, Raouf Al Kubaisi, worked for Hussein bin Ali, King of Hejaz and held several posts in Iraq, including the governor of Basra.

Basil was educated in Baghdad. He attended the American University of Beirut (AUB) until 1954 when he was expelled from the university due to his nationalist activities. While attending the AUB he met with George Habash, future leader of the PFLP. Al Kubaisi continued his university studies in the USA where he received a degree in political sciences from Adams State University, Colorado, in 1956.

Al Kubaisi held a master's degree from the Howard University in Washington, D.C. in 1966. His MA thesis was entitled The Algerian Front de Liberation (F.L.N.), 1954-1964: From Liberation Movement to Political Party.

Al Kubaisi received his PhD from the American University, Washington, D.C., in 1971. His doctoral thesis was entitled Arab Nationalist Movement 1951-1971: From Pressure Group to Socialist Party. While making interviews to gather data for his study Al Kubaisi also met an American agent Robert Ames in Aden, Yemen.

His PhD thesis was translated into Arabic by Al Kubaisi's wife in 1973 and was published by the Beirut-based Dar Al 'Awda and Majallat Al Hadaf with the title Harakat al Qawmiyyin al Arab (Arabic: The Arab Nationalist Movement). It was later republished by the Arab Research Foundation in 1985 with the same title.

== Career and activities ==
Following his graduation in 1955 Al Kubaisi returned to Iraq and became a member of the Arab Nationalist Movement (ANM). He was appointed director of the Office of the Iraqi Foreign Minister in 1956. He was arrested and detained in March 1958 due to his involvement in the attack against the Jordanian delegation in Baghdad. The Jordanians were in Baghdad as part of the negotiations to declare the Hashemite Union. Al Kubaisi also attempted to assassinate King Faisal of Iraq in the same incident. He was released from prison soon after the regime change in July 1958 which overthrew the Iraqi monarchy. He was again arrested by the new regime due to his ANM activities.

After his release from prison Al Kubaisi left Iraq and settled in Beirut. He became a member of the PFLP in 1967 when the organization was established. He was mainly involved in logistics activities in the group.

Al Kubaisi worked as a faculty member at the American University of Beirut. Then he joined the University of Calgary, Canada, in 1969 where he worked until his assassination in 1972.

== Assassination ==
Israel initiated attacks against leading Arab figures after the killing of Israeli Olympic team members by the Black September Organization in Munich in September 1972. Al Kubaisi was on the assassination list of the Mossad's Committee X, and they claimed that although he was not related to the Munich attack, he was a member of the PFLP which had been involved in various terrorist attacks against Israelis. On the other hand, it was argued by the Mossad that Al Kubaisi helped the Black September Organization in terms of logistics and communications in Europe. However, both Aaron J. Klein and George Jonas who published books in 2005 on the Munich attack openly stated that there was no connection between Al Kubaisi and the Black September Organization and that he did not have any role in the attack.

Al Kubaisi was shot to death by two Mossad agents near his hotel on Paris's Chauveau Lagarde street on 6 April 1973. The perpetrators were part of the Caesarea group within the Mossad. They gunned down him nine times using a silenced Beretta pistol, and he died instantly.

Al Kubaisi was buried in Baghdad after a funeral ceremony attended by many Iraqi and Palestinian officials.

=== Aftermath ===
Immediately after the assassination the Iraqi embassy in Paris announced that it was "a terrorist act by Israeli secret agents." A Palestinian news agency reported that he was “on a mission” for the PFLP in Paris. His doctoral thesis was published in the PFLP's media organ Al-Hadaf magazine on 14 September 1974. The magazine also published an obituary where Al Kubaisi was described as an "important ANM and PFLP member."

== Personal life ==
Al Kubaisi was married to Nadra Al Khudairi who held a PhD in English literature and was a member of a well-known Baghdadi family. They had three sons, Ahmed, Yasser and Yaarub.
