= Ezzedine Kalak =

Palestinian Arab diplomat (1936–1978)

- عز الدين القلق
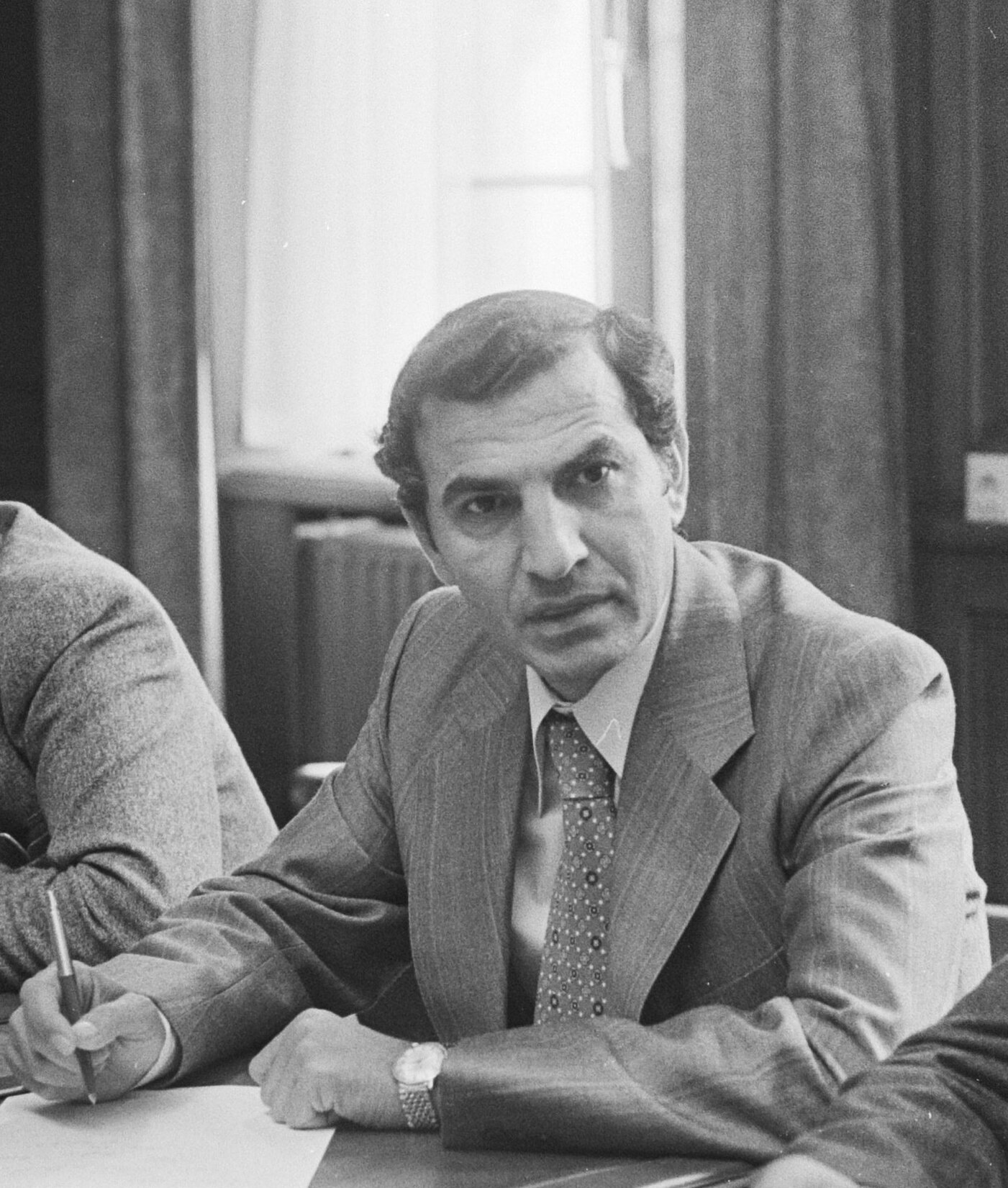
- Kalak (1977)
- Born: 1936; Haifa, Mandatory Palestine
- Died: 3 August 1978 (aged 41–42); Paris, France
- Cause of death: Assassination
- Burial place: Damascus
- Education: Damascus University; University of Poitiers
- Years active: 1960s–1978

Ezzedine Kalak (Arabic: عز الدين القلق, romanized: 'Izz al-Din al-Qalaq; 1936–1978) was a member of the Fatah and served as the representative of the Palestine Liberation Organization (PLO) in France from 1973 to his assassination in Paris on 3 August 1978. He was killed by the Abu Nidal group.

== Early life and education ==
Kalak was born in Haifa, Mandatory Palestine, in 1936. He was named after Ezzeddin Al Qassam, leader of the Arab revolt in Palestine between 1936 and 1939. Kalak had seven siblings.

Kalak was educated in Haifa until Nakba in 1948 when the family had to leave Palestine and settled in Damascus. Following his graduation from high school he attended Damascus University. During his studies he joined a literary group and published short stories in the Syrian newspapers. He also became a member of the Syrian Communist Party while studying at the university. He was imprisoned for three years due to his Communist activities from 1959 and 1961. After his release from prison he translated and published American and Chinese short stories. He graduated from Damascus University in 1963 obtaining a degree in chemistry.

Kalak received a Ph.D. in physical chemistry from the University of Poitiers in the late 1960s. During his studies in France he joined the Fatah and was elected head of the General Union of Palestinian Students in France.

== Career and activities ==
Following his graduation from Damascus University Kalak worked as a teacher in Riyadh, Saudi Arabia, until 1965. He settled in Paris after he completed his Ph.D. and worked for Radio Monte Carlo as a translator. He established a magazine entitled Fedayeen (Arabic: Resistance fighter) in Paris in 1970. During this period he began to work with Mahmoud Hamshari, PLO's representative in France. Kalak was instrumental in getting support from French artists, including Serge Le Péron and Claude Lazar, for the Palestinian cause. Through Kalak's initiatives the French artists produced posters and contributed to the exhibitions and other artistic events in support of Palestinian resistance movement.

Kalak succeeded Hamshari as representative of the PLO in France in September 1973 after the assassination of Hamshari by Mossad agents. The PLO office was semi-officially recognized by France on 31 October 1975 and was reopened at the Arab League headquarters in the Boulevard Haussmann in Paris. Kalak was the first Palestinian official invited to Élysée Palace to attend a ceremony held for the Saudi Arabian King Khalid in 1978.

Kalak collected Palestinian political posters from the 1960s and 1970s. These were archived by Poster House in New York City which donated them to the Watson Library.

== Assassination ==
Kalak and his aide Adnan Hammad were shot to death at the PLO Office in Paris on 3 August 1978. Three other people were also injured in the attack.

The perpetrators were Hatem Husni and Kayad Assad who were the members of the Black June, part of the Abu Nidal Organization, a revolutionary Palestinian group. They were university students in France and were both Jordanians of Palestinian origin. Husni and Assad were arrested immediately after the murder. They were sentenced to fifteen years in prison in March 1980. However, they were released from prison in 1986 and deported from France as a result of the negotiations between the government of France and Abu Nidal Organization. Through the deal the terrorist attacks of the Abu Nidal Organization in France were terminated. Following their release from prison Hatem Husni and Kayad Assad met with Abu Nidal, leader of the Abu Nidal Organization, at an undisclosed location.

A funeral ceremony for Kalak and Adnan Hammad was held at the Grand Mosque, Paris, and Kalak was buried in Damascus on 5 August 1978. Hammad was buried in Beirut, Lebanon.
