= Aaron J. Klein =

Israeli author and journalist (1960 - 2016)

Aaron J. Klein (Hebrew: אהרון קליין; 1960 - July 7, 2016) was an Israeli author and journalist. He previously served as Time magazine's military and intelligence affairs correspondent in the Jerusalem Bureau. The recipient of 2002 Henry Luce Award, Aaron J. Klein, an M.A. in history from Hebrew University, has taught journalism at the college and university level in Israel.

His book Striking Back: The 1972 Munich Olympics Massacre and Israel's Deadly Response (2005) was translated into a dozen languages and published in more than twenty countries. Among the allegations Klein presented was the alleged Mossad operation to kill leading Palestinian militant Wadie Haddad in 1978 by poisoning him via a manipulated box of Belgian chocolates.

In 2014, Klein's book Master of Operations — a biography of Mossad agent Mike Harari — was published in Israel.

Klein died of cancer on July 7, 2016.
