= One Day in September =

- Cinema poster
- Directed by: Kevin Macdonald
- Produced by: John Battsek; Arthur Cohn
- Narrated by: Michael Douglas
- Cinematography: Neve Cunningham; Alwin H. Küchler
- Edited by: Justine Wright
- Music by: Alex Heffes
- Production companies: BBC Films; Passion Pictures
- Distributed by: Redbus Film Distribution (UK); Sony Pictures Classics (US)
- Release dates: 22 October 1999 (US); 19 May 2000 (UK)
- Running time: 94 minutes
- Country: United Kingdom
- Language: English

One Day in September is a 1999 documentary film directed by Kevin Macdonald examining the 5 September 1972 murder of 11 Israeli athletes at the 1972 Summer Olympics in Munich, Germany. Michael Douglas provides the sparse narration throughout the film.

The film won the Academy Award for Best Documentary Feature at the 72nd Academy Awards, on 26 March 2000.

== Summary ==
The documentary begins with an advertisement by the Munich Tourism Bureau, when the city was bidding for the 1972 Summer Olympics, with a local woman inviting the world and the IOC members to vote in a favor of the city, then shows interviews with the wives of some of the murdered athletes, including Ankie Spitzer, widow of fencing coach Andre Spitzer. The film also features the first known filmed interview with Jamal Al-Gashey, the only surviving member of Black September. Al-Gashey, who is in hiding in Africa, wears a cap and sunglasses and his face is slightly blurred.

There are various shots of the Games getting under way, and attention is given to the lax security the Germans had at the Games. The terrorists are seen preparing for the assault; Al-Gashey claims that he and the other Black September members were trained in Libya before going to West Germany to begin the assault.

The assault is described by Al-Gashey as well as by some of the German security staff present. Footage of ABC anchor Jim McKay is interspersed, along with sound clips of Peter Jennings, to give an impression of events unfolding as they happened. General Ulrich Wegener, founder of the German counter-terrorist unit GSG 9, was also interviewed during the film, and was roundly criticized for his seemingly flippant attitude about the subject matter.

The film offers evidence supporting the allegation that the rescue operation was poorly planned and executed; for instance, the German police assigned to the getaway aeroplane voted to abandon this as a suicide mission without consulting the central command, while the snipers were not prepared and were poorly positioned. The film implies that had the German government prepared better, the athletes might have been saved. Former Mossad Director Zvi Zamir, who was present at the airport during the final gunfight, is interviewed about his views on the failed rescue (he had previously been interviewed on this subject in an NBC profile of the Munich massacre broadcast during the Barcelona Olympics). At the end of the section, graphic photographs of the dead Israelis and Palestinians are shown in a photo-montage set to the Deep Purple song "Child in Time".

The film also alleges that the 29 October hijacking of a Lufthansa jet and the subsequent release of the three surviving Black September members in exchange for the hostages was a set-up by the German government, who did not want their failings to be made obvious in the trial.

== Reception ==
Film critic Roger Ebert gave the film 3/4 stars, writing that he found the choice to depict the events in the style of a thriller "a little unsettling. It’s one thing to see a fictional re-creation of facts, [...] and another to see facts tarted up like fiction." He still recommended the film, stating that it "grips the attention and is exciting and involving. I recommend it on that basis--and also because of the new information it contains." He also stated that "Macdonald brings remarkable research to the film" and "he relentlessly builds up a case against the way the Germans and the International Olympic Committee handled the crisis." However, Ebert also criticized the film's ending, writing "I was disturbed, however, by Macdonald’s pumped-up style, and by a tasteless conclusion in which images of action, bloodshed and corpses are cut together into a montage and backed with rock music."

In a mixed review for The Guardian, Peter Bradshaw wrote "If Macdonald's film is tough on the Germans, it is lax and naive about the Palestinian cause," noting, "the families of murdered Israeli athletes are extensively and sympathetically interviewed, and gruesome police pictures of the corpses are shown, but there is no balancing attempt to make sense of the Arab and Palestinian experience of oppression"; for instance "the film passes very lightly over the fact that [Al-Gashey] was kept at the Chatila refugee camp, without dwelling on the resonance of that." However Bradshaw ultimately describes the film as "chilling" and "very watchable", writing: "For all its occasional naivety and bias, Macdonald's film is a riveting and hallucinatory recapitulation of 20th-century history: in 1945, the horrifying crimes of Germany lead to the foundation of the state of Israel, which in turn lead to the mass dispossession of the Palestinian people, and 27 years later the Germans, the Jews and the Arabs meet in a bloody, slapstick collision at the 1972 Olympic Games in Munich."

On review aggregator website Rotten Tomatoes, the film holds an approval rating of 97% based on 32 reviews, with an average rating of 8.0/10.

== Concerns about screenings for Academy Awards ==
Roger Ebert continued his criticisms after the film received an Academy Award, claiming that the producer, Arthur Cohn, intentionally subverted the Academy's documentary and foreign film by-laws – which dictate that only members who have seen all of the nominated films may vote – by limiting screenings of his film to a small group of invited people; "by limiting those who have seen his, Cohn shrinks the voting pool and improves his odds."

Joe Berlinger, director of the documentaries Brother's Keeper and Paradise Lost, agreed telling Ebert "The long list of snubbed [documentary] films (as well as the long list of undeserved winners) confirms for me that this award in this category has little meaning other than the skill to manipulate the system. (Of course there are always exceptions--deserving films that actually get recognized.) Until there is a documentary branch of the Academy that treats docs like any other film in any other category, nothing will change, despite the recent band-aid attempt to improve the situation."

== See also ==
- Munich '72 and Beyond (2018)
- Sword of Gideon (1986)
- Munich (2005)
- September 5 (2024)

== Bibliography ==
- Reeve, Simon (New York, 2001), One Day in September: the full story of the 1972 Munich Olympic massacre and the Israeli operation 'Wrath of God' ISBN 1-55970-547-7
