= Zvi Zamir =

Director of the Mossad (1968–1974)

- צבי זמיר
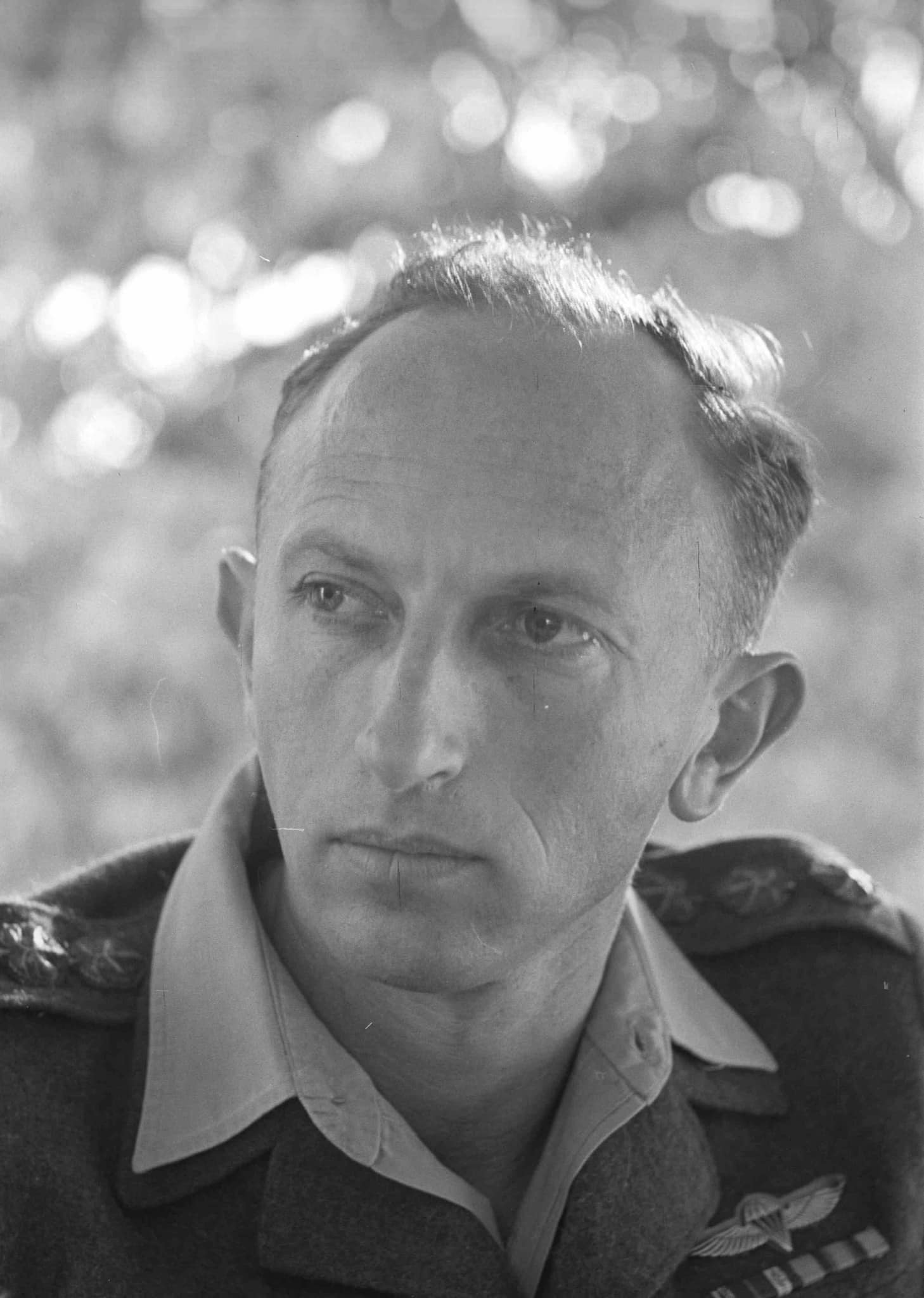
- Zamir in 1960
- Born: Zvicka Zarzevsky; 3 March 1925; Łódź, Poland
- Died: 2 January 2024 (aged 98); Tel Aviv, Israel
- Occupation: Director of Mossad
- Espionage activity
- Allegiance: State of Israel
- Service branch: Palmach; Israel Defense Forces; Mossad
- Service years: Palmach: 1942–1948; IDF: 1948–1968; Mossad: 1968–1974
- Rank: Major general

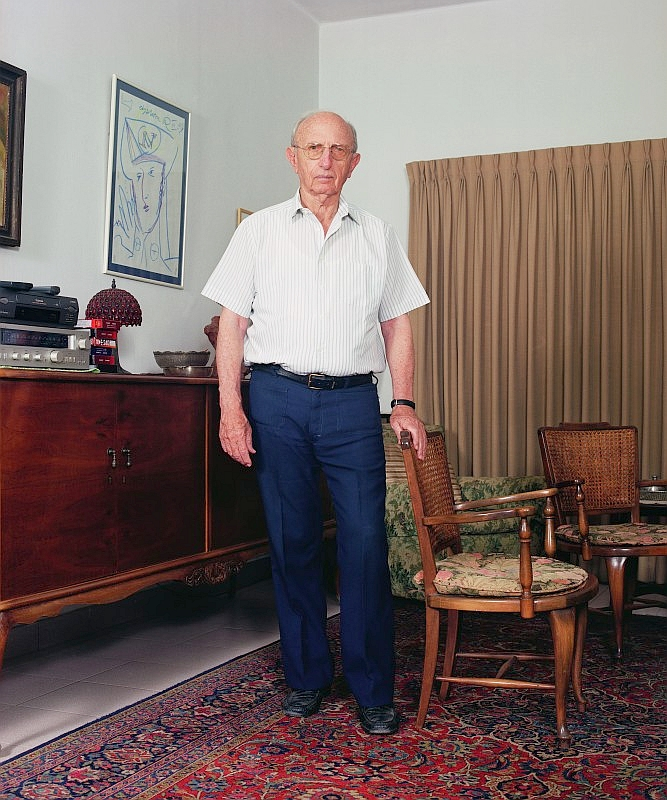
Zamir 2004

Zvi Zamir (Hebrew: צבי זמיר; born Zvicka Zarzevsky; 3 March 1925 – 2 January 2024) was a major general in the Israel Defense Forces and the director of the Mossad from 1968 to 1974.

== Early life ==
Born in Poland on 3 March 1925, Zamir immigrated with his family to the then British Mandate of Palestine when he was only seven months old. At the age of 18, Zamir began his military career, first as a soldier in the Haganah's Palmach, a unit that included future Israeli leaders such as Moshe Dayan and Yitzhak Rabin

== Intelligence career ==
=== IDF posts ===
During the 1948 Arab–Israeli War, Zamir fought in the newly created Israel Defense Forces as an infantry platoon leader. After the war he continued climbing the chain of command, becoming a licensed reconnaissance pilot for the Artillery branch, and was eventually promoted to the commander of the Southern Command. His final IDF post before being appointed Mossad director came in 1966, when he was appointed the military attaché to London.

=== Mossad ===
During his tenure at the Mossad, he helped carry out an assassination campaign, the Israeli response to the Munich Massacre, and dealt with the lead up and aftermath of the Yom Kippur War in 1973. After the West German government refused to accept an Israeli special forces team during the Munich hostage crisis, Zamir was sent to observe activities. He was at the Fürstenfeldbruck airbase the night that the failed rescue attempt left all nine remaining Israeli hostages dead. Zamir was interviewed about the incident in 1999 when he spoke with the producer of One Day in September, a documentary on the massacre. In it he strongly criticized the German rescue effort for its complete lack of coordination. He had previously been interviewed on this subject for an NBC profile during their coverage of the 1992 Barcelona Olympics, and he discussed the massacre several times thereafter.

== Later life ==
Zamir was played by Ami Weinberg in Steven Spielberg's 2005 movie Munich.

His memoirs were published in Hebrew in 2011 under the title With Open Eyes (Be'einaim Pekuhot, בעיניים פקוחות).

Zamir lived in Tzahala, a neighborhood in the north of Tel Aviv. He died on 2 January 2024, at the age of 98.
