= Timeline of the Israeli–Palestinian conflict =

This timeline of the Israeli–Palestinian conflict lists events from 1948 to the present. The Israeli–Palestinian conflict emerged from intercommunal conflict in Mandatory Palestine between Palestinian Jews and Arabs, often described as the background to the Israeli–Palestinian conflict. The conflict in its modern phase evolved since the declaration of the State of Israel on May 14, 1948, and consequent intervention of Arab armies on behalf of the Palestinian Arabs.

== Background ==
Israel gained independence on May 14, 1948, while a Palestinian attempt to establish a state in the Gaza Strip in September 1948 under an Egyptian protectorate failed, being de facto managed by Egyptian military and announced dissolved in 1959.

== 1948–1949: Arab–Israeli War ==
Month, Day	Event(s)
=== 1948 ===
May 13	Haganah took control of Jaffa. The Irgun had been shelling Jaffa for three weeks. After most of the Arab population fled the city, its 1947 population of 70,000 was reduced to 4,000.
May 14	The Jewish People's Council gathered at the Tel Aviv Museum, and approved a proclamation declaring "the establishment of a Jewish state in Eretz Israel, to be known as the State of Israel".
May 14	At midnight the British Mandate over Palestine terminated.
May 15	Following a letter from the Agent of the new Provisional Government to President Truman that the state of Israel has been proclaimed as an independent republic within frontiers approved by the General Assembly of the United Nations, the United States recognized the provisional government as the de facto authority of the new State of Israel.
May 15	Members of the Arab League – Syria, Iraq, Egypt, Transjordan, the Holy War Army and the Arab Liberation Army, marched their forces into what had the previous day ceased to be the British Mandate for Palestine. The League of Arab States sent a cablegram to the Secretary-General of the United Nations saying, "On the occasion of the intervention of Arab States in Palestine to restore law and order and to prevent disturbances prevailing in Palestine from spreading into their territories and to check further bloodshed".
May 23	Thomas C. Wasson, US Consul General, assassinated in Jerusalem.
June	Violent confrontation between the Israel Defense Forces (IDF) under the command of David Ben-Gurion, and the paramilitary Jewish group Irgun known as The Altalena Affair resulted in the dismantlement of the Irgun, Lehi, and all Israeli paramilitary organizations operating outside the IDF. Infiltration by Palestinian fedayeen began from Egypt, resulting in many minor skirmishes, raids and counter-raids, causing hundreds of casualties on both sides, including many civilians. One thousand three hundred Israelis were killed or wounded in paramilitary attacks.
September 17	Folke Bernadotte, United Nations Peace Envoy, assassinated in Jerusalem.
September 22	The All-Palestine Government assembled in the Egyptian-controlled Gaza Strip and was recognized by all members of the Arab League except Jordan.
October 28	The Israeli army killed at least 70 villagers at Al-Dawayima.
=== 1949 ===
February–July	Israel concluded the Armistice Agreements with neighbouring countries. The territory of the Mandatory Palestine was divided between the State of Israel, the Transjordan and the All-Palestine Government in Gaza, under prefecture of Egypt. During and after the war about 711,000 Palestinian Arabs became displaced and refugees. 800,000–1,000,000 Jews living in Muslim countries left or were expelled during or after the war.
February 24	Armistice signed with Egypt.
February	148 infiltrators killed by the Israeli army during February in area around Majdal/Ashkelon.
March 23	Armistice signed with Lebanon.
April 3	Armistice signed with Transjordan.
June	Israeli army killed 93 infiltrators along Southern Jordan and Gaza Strip borders.
July 30	Armistice signed with Syria.
July	59 infiltrators killed by Israeli army. It is estimated that at least 1000 were killed during 1949, the vast majority of them unarmed.

== 1948–1966 ==
Between 1949 and 1953, there were 99 complaints made by Israel about the infiltration of armed groups or individuals and 30 complaints of armed Jordanian units crossing into Israeli territory. Several hundred Israeli civilians were killed by infiltrators, and some were raped and mutilated. Israel launched numerous reprisal raids in response. Between 1949 and 1956, 286 Israeli civilians were killed. During the same period, excluding the Suez War, 258 Israeli soldiers were killed. Between 2,700 and 5,000 Arab infiltrators were killed. It is unclear whether these Arabs were really infiltrators or were simply unauthorized crossers, as many Palestinians were crossing into Israel for economic reasons. The Israeli forces necessarily treated anyone attempting unauthorized entry as a potential infiltrator, given the level of bloodshed.

Month, Day	Event(s)
=== 1951 === The State of Israel was confronted by a wave of Palestinian infiltrations (fedayeen). In 1951, 118 Israelis, including 48 civilians, were killed by such infiltrators. According to Israeli army records, an average of 36 infiltrators were killed each month during 1951. Arabs were also being attacked by the Israelis, and the overall situation deteriorated. Israel began Retribution Operations as punishment and prevention measures.
February 6–7	Sharafat, a village south-west of Jerusalem, attacked by Israeli army. Nine villagers killed.
=== 1952 === 68 Israelis, including 42 civilians, were killed by Palestinian infiltrators. The Israeli army killed a monthly average of 33 people crossing the armistice lines, including 78 in March and 57 in April.
January 6–7	Israeli army attacked Bayt Jala killing seven people.
=== 1953 === 71 Israelis, including 44 civilians, killed by Palestinian infiltrators.
April 22	At least six Jordanian soldiers killed by Israeli sniper fire from West Jerusalem.
May 17–23	Operation "Viper on the Track": seven West Bank villages and a Bedouin camp in Israel attacked by Israeli army.
August 11–12	Operation "Vengeance and Reprisal": four West Bank villages attacked by Israeli army, including al-Khader and Surif. Six people killed.
October 16	Qibya massacre. Unit 101, commanded by Ariel Sharon, carried out a raid on the village of Qibya. Over 60 Arabs killed.
=== 1954 === 57 Israelis killed, including 33 civilians. Israeli Border Police record between May and December they killed 51 infiltrators.
March 16–17	Ma'ale Akrabim massacre: Arab gang attacked an Israeli civilian bus, killing 11.
April 28–29	Operation "Lion": Nahhalin village attacked by Israeli army. Nine people killed: four National Guardsmen, three Jordanian soldiers, the village mukhtar and a woman.
July 10–12	Operation "Eye for an Eye": An Israeli company led by Ariel Sharon attacked a post on the Gaza border near Kissufim, killing 9 or 10 Palestinian gendarmes.
July 23–24	Start of the Lavon Affair.
=== 1955 === 74 Israelis killed, including 24 civilians. The Israeli army recorded 36 hostile infiltrators as killed.
February 28 – March 1	Operation "Black Arrow": Ariel Sharon led an Israeli attack on an Egyptian army base in the Gaza Strip, killing 38 soldiers and two civilians.
August 31 – September 1	Israeli army attacked outskirts of Khan Yunis. 72 Egyptians and Palestinians killed.
October 27–28	Ariel Sharon led a force of 200 Israeli paratroopers on an attack on Kuntilla. 12 Egyptian soldiers killed.
November 2–3	Operation "Volcano": the Israeli army attacked Egyptian army positions in al Sabha and Wadi Siram, killing 81 Egyptian soldiers.
December 11–12	Operation "Olive Leaves": a large Israeli force commanded by Ariel Sharon attacked Syrian positions east of Lake Tiberias. 48 Syrian soldiers and six civilians killed.
=== 1956 === 117 Israelis killed, including 54 civilians (excluding soldiers killed during the attack on the Suez Canal).
April 5	Moshe Dayan ordered the shelling of the centre of Gaza City with 120 mm mortars. 57 civilians and four Egyptian soldiers killed.
October 9	Qalqilya police station attacked by an Israeli battalion-sized force that included armour and artillery. Between 70 and 90 Jordanians killed.
October 29 – November	Suez Crisis. Israel invaded Egypt's Sinai Peninsula with covert assent from France and Britain. The European nations had economic and trading interests in the Suez Canal, while Israel wanted to reopen the canal for Israeli shipping and end Egyptian-supported fedayeen incursions and attacks. Israel completely withdrew six months later when Egypt assured Israel unimpeded navigation and safety.
October 29 – November	In the Kafr Qasim massacre, 48 or 49 Arab civilians were killed by the Israel Border Police as they returned to their village from work.
=== 1957 ===
March	Israel withdrew its forces from the Sinai Peninsula, ending the Suez Crisis.
=== 1959 === The Cairo-born Yasser Arafat formed Fatah to conduct guerrilla warfare operations against Israel.
=== 1963 === In a new wave of Arab socialism, the Ba'ath Party took power in Iraq and Syria. Among the key Ba'ath aims was the support of the Palestinian cause.
=== 1964 ===
February 3	The Palestine Liberation Organization (PLO) was founded in Cairo by the Arab League. Ahmad Shuqeiri was its first leader, although the organization was de facto controlled by the Egyptian government. The PLO stated their goal as the destruction of the State of Israel through armed struggle and its replacement with an "independent Palestinian state" between the Jordan River and the Mediterranean.

== 1967–1973 ==
Month, Day	Event(s)
=== 1967 ===
June	The Six-Day War. Israel launched a defensive strike on Egyptian Air Force (June 5), following Egyptian naval blockade of the Straits of Tiran (May 22) and Egyptian military buildup in the Sinai Peninsula (May 16), interpreted as acts of war. Attack quickly turned into a regional war, in which Israel defeated the combined forces of Egypt, Syria, Jordan, Iraq and their supporters. It captured the Sinai Peninsula and the Gaza Strip from Egypt, East Jerusalem and the West Bank from Jordan, and the Golan Heights from Syria. The number of war casualties estimated between 15,000 and 25,000.
September 1	The Khartoum Resolution issued at the Arab Summit with eight Arab countries adopted the "three "no"s": 1. No peace with Israel; 2. No recognition of Israel; 3. No negotiations with Israel.
November 22	The UN Security Council adopts Resolution 242, the "land for peace" formula, which has been the starting point for further negotiations.
=== 1968 === Between 1968 and 1970, Egypt waged a War of Attrition against Israel.
March 21	Israel fought the Battle of Karameh against Fatah and Jordanian forces.
December 27–28	Israeli army launched an attack on Beirut airport, destroying 13 aircraft valued at $43.8 million.
=== 1969 ===
February 2	Yasser Arafat, head of the Fatah party, appointed chairman of the Palestine Liberation Organization, replacing Ahmad Shukeiri, after Fatah became the dominant force in the PLO.
August 21	Denis Michael Rohan, an Australian Christian working on an Israeli kibbutz, set fire to the Al Aqsa Mosque in Jerusalem, causing extensive damage and destroying the 12th century minbar.
September 22–25	King Faisal of Saudi Arabia convened a conference in Rabat, Morocco, to discuss the arson attack on the Al Aqsa Mosque. The leaders of 25 Muslim states attended and the conference called for Israel to give up territory conquered in 1967. The conference also set up the Organisation of Islamic Cooperation and pledged its support for the Palestinians.
=== 1970 ===
May 8	Avivim school bus massacre: Palestinian militants from Lebanon attacked an Israeli school bus, killing 12 (mostly children) and wounding another 19.
September	The PLO was driven out of Jordan, decamping to south Lebanon.
=== 1971 ===
January 2	Murder of the Aroyo children. A Palestinian teenager threw a hand grenade into the moving car of the Aroyo family. The children, aged 4 and 7, were killed and the parents injured.
=== 1972 ===
May 8	A Sabena airplane flying from Vienna to Tel Aviv was hijacked by four members of Black September and held at Lod Airport. The hijackers demanded the release of 100 Palestinian prisoners. Israeli paratroopers disguised as mechanics entered the aircraft, killed two of the hijackers and released 90 passengers.
May 30	Lod Airport massacre. Acting on behalf of the Popular Front for the Liberation of Palestine, Japanese Red Army members entered Lod Airport's waiting area and fired indiscriminately at staff, passengers and visitors. 24 people were killed and 78 injured.
July 9	PFLP spokesman and author Ghassan Kanafani and his 17-year-old niece killed by an Israeli car bomb in Beirut.
July 11	A grenade thrown within Tel Aviv's bus terminal, claimed to be retaliation for Kanafani's killing, injures 11.
July 19	Anis al-Sayigh, Director of the Beirut Center for Palestinian Affairs, injured by an Israeli letter bomb.
July 25	Bassam Abu Sharif, chief assistant to George Habash, badly injured by Israeli letter bomb delivered to PFLP offices in Beirut.
August 5	Ali Hasan Salameh, a Black September commander, led an attack on an American-owned oil-storage facility at Trieste in Italy.
September 6	The Munich massacre of Israeli Olympic athletes by Palestinian militant group, Black September. The terrorists killed two of the athletes and took nine hostage, demanding the release of 250 Palestinian and Lebanese prisoners held in Israel. They called their operation "Ikrit and Biram" after two villages in northern Israel. In an airport shoot-out with the West German police, five terrorists were killed, but not before they shot and killed the remaining Israeli hostages. This led Israel to launch reprisal assassinations known as Operation Wrath of God.
September 11	Zadock Ophir, a Mossad clerk at the Israeli embassy in Brussels shot and badly wounded by a Palestinian.
September 19	Ami Shchori, agricultural attaché at the Israeli embassy in London, killed by an Arab letter bomb.
October 17	Wa'el Zu'aiter, Fatah's representative in Rome, shot dead by Israeli agents.
December 8	Mahmoud Hamshari, PLO representative in Paris, badly wounded by an Israeli bomb. He died a month later.
December 28	Black September gunmen entered the Israeli embassy in Bangkok and took six Israeli hostage. They demanded the release of 36 Palestinians. The hostages were released unharmed.
=== 1973 ===
January 24	Hussein Abu-Khair, Fatah representative in Cyprus, killed by an Israeli bomb in Nicosia.
January 26	Baruch Cohen, Mossad director of operations against Palestinians in Europe, killed in Madrid by a Fatah gunman.
February 22	Israeli Air Force jets shot down Libyan Arab Airlines Flight 114 over Sinai, killing 104 passengers and crew.
March 6	Black September gunmen attacked the Saudi embassy in Khartoum demanding the release of Abu Dawud held in Jordan. They murdered the American ambassador, Cleo Noel, the retiring American chargé d'affaires, George Moore and a Belgian diplomat, Guy Eid.
March 12	Simha Gilzer, a Mossad agent, shot dead in Nicosia by Palestinian gunmen.
April 6	Basil Al Kubaisi, a PFLP official, killed by Israeli agents in Paris.
April 9	Operation "Spring of Youth": Israeli commandos raided PLO targets in Beirut. After Muhammad Youssef al-Najjar, Kamal Adwan and Kamal Nasser were killed at home, the resulting demonstrations brought down the Lebanese government.
April 27	An Israeli El Al employee was murdered in Rome by a Palestinian gunman.
June 27	Muhammad Boudia, an Algerian member of Fatah, killed in Paris by an Israeli bomb.
July 2	Yosef Alon, Israeli defense attaché, shot dead outside his home in Washington, D.C.
July 21	Mossad gunmen mistook a Moroccan waiter in Lillehammer, Norway for a perpetrator of the Munich massacre and shot him dead. Six Israelis captured and put on trial.
October	Yom Kippur War. Syria and Egypt unleashed a surprise attack on Israeli forces in the Golan Heights and the Sinai Peninsula on the holiest day of the Hebrew calendar and last day of Ramadan. Jordan, Iraq, and other Arab nations joined in and/or supported the Arab war effort. Many Israeli prisoners of war were tortured and killed by Egypt and Syria while in captivity.
October 19	In a speech to the US Congress, US President Richard Nixon requested permission to deliver large amounts of weapons to Israel. In response, King Faisal announced that Saudi Arabia would stop all oil shipments to the United States. The Netherlands was also included in the embargo.

== 1974–1980s: Palestinian insurgency in South Lebanon ==
Month, Day	Event(s)
=== 1974 ===
April 11	Kiryat Shmona massacre. The PFLP–GC militia crossed the border into Israel from Lebanon, entered an apartment building and killed all 18 residents. Half were children.
May 15	Ma'alot massacre. The Democratic Front for the Liberation of Palestine attacked a van killing two Israeli Arab women, entered an apartment and killed a family, and took over a local school and held 115 students and teachers hostage. 25 Israelis were killed at the school, including 22 children, and 68 were wounded.
October 14	The PLO was recognized by the UN General Assembly as the representative of the Palestinian people and was granted the right to participate in the deliberations on Palestine.
October 26–29	The Arab League recognized the PLO as sole representative of the Palestinians.
November 13	Yasser Arafat addressed the United Nations General Assembly.
November 22	The United Nations General Assembly adopts Resolution 3236, which recognizes Palestinians right to self-determination, officiates the U.N.'s contact with the Palestine Liberation Organization, and added the "Question of Palestine" to the U.N. agenda, on top of promoting PLO non-observer status at UN assemblies, allowing them to participate in all Assembly sessions.
=== 1975 ===
March 4	Savoy Operation. Eight Palestinian terrorists in two teams landed by boat in Tel Aviv. Shooting and throwing grenades, they captured the Savoy Hotel and took the guests as hostages. Five hostages were freed and eight killed. Three Israeli soldiers were also killed.
July 4	A "refrigerator bomb" in Jerusalem killed 15 Israelis and wounded 77.
November 10	United Nations General Assembly Resolution 3379, adopted by a vote of 72 to 35 with 32 abstentions, "determines that Zionism is a form of racism and racial discrimination". The resolution was revoked by Resolution 46/86 on December 16, 1991.
November 13	An explosive charge went off near Cafe Naveh on Jaffa Road, near the pedestrian mall. Seven Israeli civilians killed and 45 injured.
=== 1976 ===
May 3	Ben Yehuda Street in Jerusalem bombed by Palestinian terrorists. 33 civilians injured.
July 4	Operation "Entebbe". Air France Flight 139, originating in Tel Aviv, took off from Athens, Greece, heading for Paris. It was hijacked by four terrorists (two from the Popular Front for the Liberation of Palestine and two from the radical German militant group Revolutionary Cells). Israel performed a rescue mission to free the 248 passengers and 12 crew members held hostage at Entebbe Airport in Uganda.
=== 1977 ===
January 3	Mahmud Salih, PLO representative in Paris and manager of an Arab bookshop, killed by Israeli agents.
=== 1978 ===
January 4	Sa'id Hammami, PLO representative in London and well-known dove, killed by an Abu Nidal gunman.
March 11	Coastal Road massacre. Fatah Palestinians killed an American photographer, hijacked a load bus and killed 38 more Israelis, including 13 children, and wounded 76.
March 14	Operation "Litani". Israel, in alliance with the mostly Christian South Lebanon Army, launched a limited-scope invasion of Lebanon and attempted to push Palestinian militant groups away from the Israel border. The seven-day offensive resulted in 100,000 to 285,000 refugees created and between 300 and 1,200 Lebanese and Palestinian militants and civilians killed.
June 15	Ali Yassin, PLO representative in Kuwait, killed by a member of the Abu Nidal group.
August 5	Yizz al-Din Qalaq, PLO representative in Paris and well-known dove, killed by an Abu Nidal gunman.
September 17	Israeli Prime Minister Menachem Begin and Egyptian President Anwar Sadat signed the Camp David Accord, in which Israel agreed to withdraw from the Sinai Peninsula in exchange for peace and a framework for future negotiation over the West Bank and Gaza Strip.
=== 1979 ===
January 22	Ali Hassan Salameh, head of Yasser Arafat's security unit Force 17, killed by an Israeli car bomb in Beirut.
March 14	An Israeli was killed and 13 people injured when an explosive charge blew up in a trash can in Zion Square, Jerusalem.
March 26	Egypt–Israel peace treaty. Egypt became the first Arab country to recognize Israel officially.
April 22	Samir Kuntar, a PLO operative, killed four Israelis in Nahariya, including two girls aged four and two.
=== 1980 ===
October 5	A parcel bomb blast in a postal office in Givatayim, Tel Aviv killing three people and wounding seven others, and left material damage. The authorities said that de PFLP-GC carried the attack.
=== 1981 ===
June 1	Na'im Khudr, PLO representative in Brussels and well-known dove, killed by an Abu Nidal gunman.
July 17	Israel bombed the PLO headquarters in a civilian area of Beirut, causing over 300 civilian deaths. The United States brokered a fragile cease-fire.
August 29	Abu Nidal terrorists attacked Vienna's Stadttempel, the Austrian capital's principal synagogue.
October 9	Majid Abu Sharar, a prominent member of Fatah, killed by an Israeli bomb in Rome.
October 20	A truck bomb exploded in Antwerp, Belgium outside a Portuguese Jewish synagogue.
=== 1982 ===
May 15	Israel, allied with Lebanese Christians, launched Operation "Peace for Galilee", an invasion of southern Lebanon against PLO, Syrian and Muslim Lebanese forces, claiming its purpose was to remove PLO forces camped there after several PLO cease-fire violations. The most notable of these was the Abu Nidal Organization attempt to assassinate Shlomo Argov, Israel's ambassador to the United Kingdom. As a result, the PLO leadership relocated to Tunis.
September	Sabra and Shatila massacre. Lebanese Phalangists massacred between 762 and 3,500 civilians, mostly Palestinians and Lebanese Shiites, in Sabra and the Shatila refugee camp. While no Israeli soldiers were present in the fighting, Israeli Defense Minister, Ariel Sharon, was found to be indirectly responsible by negligence for the massacre by the Kahan Commission, and was asked to resign his position. The commission's conclusions were controversial and remain a subject of debate.
9 October 1982	Great Synagogue of Rome attack.The 1982 Great Synagogue of Rome attack, which was carried out by armed Palestinian militants at the entrance to the Great Synagogue of Rome, took place on 9 October 1982 at 11:55 a.m. A 2-year-old toddler, Stefano Gaj Taché, was killed in the attack, while 37 civilians were injured.

== 1980s ==
Month, Day	Event(s)
=== 1980 ===
June 2	Israeli settlers attempted to assassinate mayors of Nablus and Ramallah in a series of car bombings.
=== 1982 ===
April 11	Israeli-American reservist Alan Harry Goodman killed two Palestinians and injured seven others at the Dome of the Rock.
=== 1983 ===
April 10	Isam Sartawi, a close associate of Yasser Arafat and prominent dove, killed by an Abu Nidal gunman in Lisbon.
July 26	Members from the Jewish Underground carried out an attack at Hebron University, killing three Palestinian students and injured more than thirty others.
August	The Israeli Army withdrew from most of Lebanon in August 1983, maintaining a self-proclaimed "Security Zone" in the south.
December 8	Murder of Danny Katz: the body of a 14-year-old Israeli was found mutilated with evidence of strangulation, torture, and sexual assault. Five Arabs were convicted of the murder.
=== 1985 ===
April 9	Sana'a Mouhadly of the Syrian Social Nationalist Party detonated herself in an explosive-laden vehicle in Lebanon, killing two Israeli soldiers and injuring two more, becoming the first reported female suicide bomber.
October 1	After three Israeli civilians were killed on board a yacht off the coast of Cyprus by the PLO's Force 17, the Israeli Air Force carried out Operation "Wooden Leg", striking the PLO base in Tunis and killing 60 PLO members.
October 7	The Palestinian Liberation Front hijacked the Achille Lauro, redirecting the cruise ship to Syria and holding its passengers and crew hostage, demanding the release of 50 Palestinians in Israeli prisons. One man was murdered; Leon Klinghoffer, a Jewish American, who was celebrating his 36th wedding anniversary with his wife. He was shot in the forehead and chest while sitting in his wheelchair.
December 27	Intending to hijack El Al jets and blow them up over Tel Aviv, Fatah – Revolutionary Council gunmen opened fire with rifles and grenades at the international airports in Rome and Vienna, killing 18 civilians and wounding 138. Six of the seven terrorists were either killed or captured.
=== 1986 ===
September 5	Pan Am Flight 73 Boeing 747-121, flying between Mumbai–Karachi–Frankfurt–New York City, was hijacked while on the ground at Karachi airport, Pakistan, by four armed Palestinian men of the Abu Nidal Organization. 360 passengers were on board. 19 passengers and 2 crew members were killed during the hijacking, including 12 Indians. 1 hijacker is serving prison sentence in the US, while 3 hijackers and 1 supporter escaped from prison in Pakistan in January 2008 and are still missing.
December 4	Students of Birzeit University began to stage protests against Israel until December 16. Four Palestinians were killed by the Israeli military during the demonstrations.
=== 1987 (before the First Intifada) ===
February 9	Civil unrest broke out across the Occupied Palestinian territories after Israeli soldiers used live ammunition to disperse a demonstration held at the Balata Camp, in the West Bank.
March 25	Civil unrest broke out in the West Bank and lasted until 15 April.
June 6	Israeli settlers attacked the Dheisheh refugee camp in the West Bank.
June 24	1987 Arab citizens of Israel general strikes

== 1987–1991: First Intifada ==
The First Intifada began with violence, riots, general strikes, and civil disobedience campaigns by Palestinians spread across the West Bank and Gaza Strip. Israeli forces responded with tear gas, plastic bullets, and live ammunition against the demonstrators.

After the outbreak of the First Intifada, Shaikh Ahmed Yassin created Hamas from the Gaza wing of the Egyptian Muslim Brotherhood. Until that point the Muslim Brotherhood in Gaza had enjoyed the support of the Israeli authorities and had refrained from violent attacks. However, Hamas quickly began attacks on Israeli military targets, and subsequently, Israeli civilians.

The Israeli army killed more than 1,000 Palestinians in the First Intifada whilst 164 Israelis were killed. Allegedly almost half (1,000) of the total Palestinian casualties were caused by internal fighting among Palestinian factions.

Month, Day	Event(s)
1987
July 22	Cartoonist Naji al-Ali shot in the head whilst walking a London street. He died of his injuries on 21 August 1987. It was later revealed that those believed to be responsible were being managed by Mossad agents.
November 25	Six Israeli soldiers killed by infiltrators who flew over the Lebanese border on hang gliders
December 8	Four Palestinian workers from Jabalya refugee camp were killed when an Israeli army tank transporter drove into their mini-bus at the Erez crossing.
1988 During 1988, 289 Palestinians in the West Bank and Gaza were killed by the Israeli security forces, and an additional 15 killed by Israeli civilians. In the same period six Israeli civilians and four members of the Israeli armed forces were killed by Palestinians.
March 24	Two Palestinian demonstrators were killed by Israeli soldiers in the Balata Camp.
April 16	Abu Jihad (Khalil al-Wazir), head of PLO's military operations, killed in his home in Tunis by a seaborne Israeli assassination squad.
May 4	Two Palestinians were killed and 12 others were injured by Israeli forces during a riot in the Jabalia refugee camp.
August 1	King Hussein of Jordan abandoned to the PLO its claim for the West Bank.
November 15	An independent State of Palestine was proclaimed by the Palestinian National Council meeting in Algiers, by a vote of 253 to 46.
December 15	The UN General Assembly approves Resolution 43/177, acknowledging the Palestinian Declaration of Independence and replacing the designating "Palestine" rather than "PLO" in the U.N.'s system.
1989 During 1989, 285 Palestinians were killed by the Israeli security forces, and an additional 17 killed by Israeli civilians. In the same period 19 Israeli civilians and six members of the Israeli armed forces were killed by Palestinians.
April 13	Israel Border Police raided the village of Nahalin in the West Bank, killing five Palestinian youths.
July 16	The Tel Aviv Jerusalem bus 405 massacre: the first Palestinian suicide attack inside Israel's borders.
1990 During 1990, 125 Palestinians were killed by the Israeli security forces, and an additional nine killed by Israeli civilians. In the same period four Israeli civilians and three members of the Israeli armed forces were killed by Palestinians.
May 20	Former IDF soldier Ami Popper killed seven Palestinian workers from Gaza at a bus stop in Rishon LeZion, Israel. He was sentenced to life imprisonment for his crimes, but later commuted to 40 years in prison.
1991 During 1991, 91 Palestinians were killed by the Israeli security forces, and an additional six killed by Israeli civilians. In the same period seven Israeli civilians and one member of the Israeli armed forces were killed by Palestinians.
January 14	Abu Iyad, second in command of Fatah and opposed to Yasser Arafat's support of Saddam Hussein, was killed in Tunis by Abu Nidal recruit Hamza Abu Zaid.
Gulf War	When the U.S.-led coalition fought to get Saddam Hussein out of Kuwait, Hussein attempted to draw Israel into the war and fired 39 Scud missiles into Israel. To avoid disrupting the U.S.-led coalition, Israel did not retaliate.

== 1991–present: Peace process ==
Month, Day	Event(s)
=== 1991 ===
October 30	Madrid Conference.
December 16	United Nations General Assembly Resolution 4686 revoked Resolution 3379 of November 10, 1975 (on Zionism and racism) by a vote of 111 to 25 and 13 abstentions.
=== 1992 === During 1992, 19 Israeli civilians and 15 members of the Israeli armed forces were killed by Palestinians. In the same period, 136 Palestinians were killed by the Israeli army. An additional two were killed by Israeli civilians.
May 24	Murder of Helena Rapp: 15-year-old Israeli girl was stabbed to death on the way to school by a Palestinian.
June	Labour Party leader Yitzhak Rabin elected Prime Minister of Israel.
=== 1993 === During 1993, 165 Palestinians were killed by the Israeli army. An additional 15 were killed by Israeli civilians. In the same period 36 Israeli civilians and 25 members of the Israeli armed forces were killed by Palestinians.
April	Mehola Junction bombing, the first suicide attack by Hamas. One Palestinian bystander was killed by the blast, and eight Israeli soldiers were slightly injured.
August 20	Yasser Arafat and Yitzhak Rabin signed the Declaration of Principles on Interim Self-Government in Oslo. This event is also seen by many people as the definitive end to the First Intifada (although some argue it had effectively ended by 1991–1992). By 1993, the violence of the Intifada had claimed the lives of 1162 Palestinians and 160 Israelis.
=== 1994 === During 1994, 110 Palestinians were killed by the Israeli security forces, and an additional 38 killed by Israeli civilians. In the same period 58 Israeli civilians and 16 members of the Israeli armed forces were killed by Palestinians.
February 25	Cave of the Patriarchs massacre. Baruch Goldstein opened fire on Palestinian Muslims worshipping at the Ibrahimi Mosque, killing 29 and injuring 125. He was subsequently overpowered and beaten to death by survivors.
April 6	Hamas carried out their first suicide bombing, in Afula, Israel, killing 5 people and the suicide bomber.
April 13	Hadera bus station suicide bombing by Hamas, killing 8 people.
May 18	Israeli forces withdrew from Jericho and Gaza City in compliance with the Oslo accords.
July	Yasser Arafat returned from exile to head the Palestinian National Authority.
October 19	22 Israelis killed by a Hamas suicide attack on a bus in Tel Aviv. This was the first major suicide bombing in Tel Aviv.
October 26	With mediation provided by the United States, the Israel–Jordan Treaty of Peace was signed by Yitzhak Rabin and King Hussein.
November 30	Afula axe attack: A Palestinian killed a 19-year-old female Israeli soldier with an axe.
December 10	Yitzhak Rabin, Shimon Peres and Yasser Arafat awarded the Nobel Peace Prize.
=== 1995 === During 1995, 42 Palestinians were killed by the Israeli security forces, and an additional three killed by Israeli civilians. In the same period 16 Israeli civilians and 30 members of the Israeli armed forces were killed by Palestinians.
January 22	Beit Lid massacre: a double suicide bombing by the Palestinian Islamic Jihad killed 21 in one of the biggest attacks which further divided the Israeli public over the peace process.
April 9	Kfar Darom bus attack: eight Israelis were killed and 52 injured in an Islamic Jihad suicide bombing.
July 24	Ramat Gan bus bombing: six Israelis killed and 33 wounded in a Hamas suicide bombing.
August 21	Ramat Eshkol bus bombing: five Israelis killed in a Hamas suicide bombing and over 100 injured.
September 28	Interim Agreement on the West Bank and the Gaza Strip, also known as Oslo II, signed in Washington, D.C.
November 4	Prime Minister Yitzhak Rabin assassinated in Tel Aviv by Jewish extremist Yigal Amir. Shimon Peres assumed the position of acting Prime Minister.
=== 1996 === During 1996, 69 Palestinians and 4 Lebanese militants were killed by the Israeli security forces, and an additional five killed by Israeli civilians. In the same period 41 Israeli civilians and 34 members of the Israeli armed forces were killed by Palestinians.
January 5	Shin Bet kill Yahya Ayyash, commander of the Izz ad-Din al-Qassam Brigades, using a telephone bomb.
February 25 – March 4	A series of suicide attacks in Jerusalem (Jerusalem bus 18 suicide bombings and in the French Hill), Tel Aviv and Ashkelon left more than 60 Israelis dead. These events were said to have had a major impact on the Israeli elections in May.
April 11–27	Operation "Grapes of Wrath" and the shelling of Qana. Operation "Grapes of Wrath" (Hebrew: מבצע ענבי זעם) was the Israeli Defense Force's code-name (Hezbollah calls it April War) for a sixteen-day campaign against Lebanon in 1996. Israel conducted more than 1,100 air raids and extensive shelling (some 25,000 shells). 639 Hezbollah cross-border rocket attacks targeted northern Israel, particularly the town of Kiryat Shemona. The conflict escalated on April 18 when Israeli artillery killed 106 civilians in a technical error and Israeli warplanes killed nine other civilians in the city of Nabatiyeh while sleeping in their two-story building. The conflict was de-escalated on 27 April by a ceasefire agreement banning attacks on civilians.
May	Likud's leader Benjamin Netanyahu elected Prime Minister of Israel.
June 9	Murder of Yaron and Efrat Ungar: Married Israeli couple shot dead by Palestinian gunmen while driving with their one-year-old son.
=== 1997 === During 1997, 18 Palestinians were killed by the Israeli security forces, and an additional five killed by Israeli civilians. In the same period 31 Israeli civilians were killed by Palestinians.
January 15–17	Protocol Concerning the Redeployment in Hebron signed. The agreement called for an IDF withdrawal from 80% of Hebron, and initiation of withdrawal from rural areas in the West Bank, as well as remaining parts of the West Bank apart from settlements and military locations. Israel and the PA agreed to begin negotiations on the permanent status agreement to be completed by May 4, 1999.
March 13	Island of Peace massacre: A Jordanian soldier opened fire on a large group of Israeli schoolgirls, killing 7 of them and injuring 6.
March 21	Cafe Apropo bombing: Palestinian suicide bomber killed 3 Israeli women and injured 48.
July 30	16 Israelis killed in a double suicide attack in the major market of Jerusalem. This was the worst killing during Netanyahu's time which is regarded as a relatively quiet period. Netanyahu attributed this to his tit-for-tat policy and his objection to the Palestinian revolving door policy.
September 4	A Hamas suicide bombing at a pedestrian mall in Jerusalem killed five Israelis, including three 14-year-old girls, and led to Chicago's Persian heritage crisis.
September 25	Mossad agents failed in an attempt to kill Hamas member Khaled Mashal in Amman.
=== 1998 === During 1998, 21 Palestinians were killed by the Israeli security forces, an additional seven killed by Israeli civilians. In the same period nine Israeli civilians and three members of the Israeli armed forces were killed by Palestinians.
October 23	Benjamin Netanyahu and Yasser Arafat signed the Wye River Memorandum at a summit in Maryland hosted by Bill Clinton. The sides agreed on steps to facilitate implementation of the Interim Agreement on the West Bank and Gaza Strip of September 28, 1995 and other related agreements including the Hebron Protocol of January 17, 1997 so that the Israeli and Palestinian sides could more effectively carry out their reciprocal responsibilities, including those relating to further redeployments and security.
=== 1999 === During 1999, eight Palestinians were killed by the Israeli security forces. In the same period two Israeli civilians and two members of the Israeli armed forces were killed by Palestinians.
May 17	Ehud Barak of the Labour Party elected Prime Minister under the One Israel banner.
=== 2000 ===
May 24	The Israeli Army withdrew from southern Lebanon, in compliance with U.N. Resolution 425. Syria and Lebanon insisted that the withdrawal was incomplete, claiming the Shebaa Farms as Lebanese and still under occupation. The UN certified full Israeli withdrawal.
July	The Camp David Summit between Israeli Prime Minister Ehud Barak and Palestinian Authority Chairman Yasser Arafat aimed at reaching a "final status" agreement. The summit concluded without an agreement.

== 2000–2005: Al-Aqsa Intifada ==
Month, Day	Event(s)
=== 2000 ===
September 28–29	Right-wing Israeli opposition leader Ariel Sharon visited the Temple Mount, which is administered by a Waqf. (Under Israeli law, each religious group is granted administration of their holy sites.) The day after the visit, violent confrontations erupted between Muslims and Israeli Police. The uprising became known as the Al-Aqsa Intifada after Sharon's visit, for the Masjid Al-Aqsa also known as the Temple Mount compound (holy also to Jews and Christians). This event is considered by some to be one of the possible catalysts of the second intifada. Palestinian leaders (including the Palestinian Minister of Communication, Imhad Falouji) later admitted publicly that the Intifada had been planned since the end of the Camp David negotiations. A campaign of suicide bombings and terrorist attacks began on September 29, 2000, and within five years left over 1,068 Israelis dead and over 7,000 injured—69 percent of them civilians. Approximately 3,000 Palestinians were also killed in this conflict.
October 1–9	October 2000 events in Israel, solidarity demonstrations held by Palestinian citizens residing in Israel escalated into clashes with Israeli police and Israeli Jewish citizens. 13 Arab civilians (12 with Israeli citizenship) were shot and killed by Israeli police and one Jewish civilian killed by a Palestinian. In a Hezbollah cross-border raid, 3 Israeli soldiers were killed and their bodies kidnapped and Northern Israel was shelled in an attempt to ignite the Israeli–Lebanese border too, but Israelis decided on limited response.
October 12	The lynching in Ramallah, two Israeli reservists accidentally entered Ramallah, to be arrested by Palestinian Security Forces, later to be publicly lynched and videotaped inside the police station.
November 22	Two Israeli women killed and 60 civilians wounded in a car bomb attack in Hadera.
December 10	Prime Minister of Israel Ehud Barak resigned.
=== 2001 === In 2001, Hamas began firing rockets towards Israeli areas. The weapons used initially were home made with of limited range and destructive capability. These were later replaced with military grade rockets.
January 21–27	Taba Summit. Peace talks between Israel and the Palestinian Authority aimed to reach the "final status" of negotiations. Ehud Barak temporarily withdrew from negotiations during the Israeli elections, and subsequently Ariel Sharon refused to continue negotiating in the face of the newly erupted violence.
February 6	Ariel Sharon of Likud elected Prime Minister and refused to continue negotiations with Yasser Arafat at the Taba Summit.
March 26	Murder of Shalhevet Pass, a 10-month-old Israeli baby was shot dead by a Palestinian sniper. The Israeli public was shocked when the investigation concluded that the sniper deliberately aimed for the baby.
June 1	Dolphinarium massacre. A Hamas suicide bomber exploded himself at the entrance of a club. 21 Israelis killed, over 100 injured, all youth. Five months prior to the bombing, there was a failed terrorist attempt at the same spot.
August 9	Sbarro restaurant massacre. A suicide bomber wearing an explosive belt weighing 5 to 10 kilograms, containing explosives, nails, nuts and bolts, detonated his bomb. In the blast 15 people (including 7 children and a pregnant woman) were killed, and 130 wounded. Both Hamas and the Islamic Jihad initially claimed responsibility.
August 27	Abu Ali Mustafa, the General Secretary of the Popular Front for the Liberation of Palestine, was assassinated by an Israeli missile shot by an Apache helicopter through his office window in Ramallah.
October 17	Israeli Tourism Minister Rehavam Zeevi assassinated in Jerusalem by members of the Popular Front for the Liberation of Palestine.
December 1	11 Israeli civilians, nine of them teenagers, were killed and 188 injured in a Hamas suicide bombing attack.
=== 2002 ===
March 13	The United States pushed through the passage of Resolution 1397 by the Security Council, demanding an "immediate cessation of all acts of violence" and "affirming a vision of a region where two states, Israel and Palestine, live side by side within secure and recognized borders".
March 14	Israeli forces continued the raid on Ramallah and other West Bank towns. A helicopter attack near Tulkarm killed Mutasen Hammad and two bystanders. A bomb in Gaza City destroyed an Israeli tank which was escorting settlers, killing 3 soldiers and wounding 2. A car bomb in Tulkarm exploded, killing 4 Palestinians. Palestinians executed two accused collaborators in Bethlehem, planning to hang one of the corpses near the Church of the Nativity until Palestinian police stopped them.
March 27	Passover massacre, the Park Hotel in Netanya held a big Passover dinner for its 250 guests. A Palestinian suicide bomber entered the hotel's dining room and detonated an explosive device, killing 30 people and injuring around 140, all civilians. Hamas claims responsibility.
March 28	The Beirut Summit approved the Saudi peace proposal.
March 29	Israeli forces began Operation "Defensive Shield", Israel's largest military operation in the West Bank since the 1967 Six-Day War.
March 30	A suicide bomber exploded in a Tel Aviv café at around 9:30 pm local time, wounding 32 people. President George W. Bush and Secretary of State Colin Powell (USA) called on Yasir Arafat to condemn the wave of suicide bombings in Arabic, to his own people. Israeli spokespeople made similar demands. Arafat went on television and swore in Arabic that he would "die a martyr, a martyr, a martyr". Members of Arafat's personal Al-Aqsa brigade stated that they would refuse any form of cease-fire, and that they would continue suicide bombings of civilians in Israel.
March 31	Matza restaurant massacre, a Palestinian Hamas bomber blew himself up in an Arab-owned restaurant in Haifa, killing 15 and injuring over 40 people.
April	Israeli troops exchanged gunfire with guards of Yasir Arafat in Ramallah.
April 2	Israeli troops occupied Bethlehem. Dozens of armed Palestinian gunmen occupied the Church of the Nativity and held the church and its clergy.
April 12	Battle of Jenin (2002) (part of Operation "Defensive Shield"). Israeli forces entered a Palestinian refugee camp in Jenin, where about a quarter of suicide bombings since 2000 had been launched from. The battle resulted in the deaths of 23 Israeli soldiers and 52 Palestinians, of which 30–47 were militants and 5–22 were civilians (sources vary). This particular event sparked a great deal of controversy.
May 9	Muhammad al-Madani, governor of Bethlehem, left the Church of the Nativity.
May 18	Israeli Shin Bet officials announced they had arrested six Israelis for conspiring to bomb Palestinian schools in April, including Noam Federman, a leader of the illegal Kach movement of Rabbi Meir Kahane, and Menashe Levinger, son of Rabbi Moshe Levinger.
June	Israel began construction of the Israeli West Bank barrier to prevent suicide bombers from entering Israel.
June 18	Patt junction massacre, a Palestinian Suicide bomber, an Islamic law student and member of Hamas, detonated a belt filled with metal balls for shrapnel on a bus in Jerusalem. 19 Israelis were killed, and over 74 wounded.
June 24	U.S. President George W. Bush called for an independent Palestinian state living in peace with Israel. Bush stated that Palestinian leaders must take steps to produce democratic reforms, and fiscal accountability, in order to improve the negotiations with Israel. He also stated that as Palestinians show control over terrorism, Israel must end operations in the West Bank, and in areas which it entered under Operation "Defensive Shield".
July 16	2002 Immanuel bus attack. Palestinian militants ambushed a bus and killed 9 Israeli civilians, including infants. The youngest victim of the Second Intifada was among them.
July 22	An Israeli warplane fired a missile at an apartment in Gaza City, killing the top of their most-wanted list, Salah Shehadeh, chief commander of Hamas' military wing, the Izzadine el-Qassam. The apartment building was flattened and 14 civilians were killed, including eight children. Writing in the Hebrew daily, Yediot Aharanot, the conservative Israeli military correspondent, Alex Fishman, explained that this bombing came 90 minutes after the Tanzim, Hamas, and Islamic Jihad had finalized the wording of a unilateral ceasefire, which was to be announced in the Washington Post the following morning.
July 31	Hebrew University massacre: nine students—four Israelis and five Americans—were killed by a suicide bomber at the Hebrew University of Jerusalem, and over 100 injured.
August 14	Marwan Barghouti, captured April 15, was indicted by a civilian Israeli court for murdering civilians and membership in a terrorist organisation.
October 21	Karkur junction suicide bombing, 14 Israelis, including seven civilians, killed in an Islamic Jihad suicide bombing in Wadi Ara.
November 21	Jerusalem bus 20 massacre, a Hamas suicide bomber detonated himself on a crowded bus in Jerusalem, killing 11 people, and wounding over 50.
=== 2003 ===
January 5	Tel Aviv central bus station massacre. 23 Israeli civilians killed by a Palestinian suicide bomber.
March 5	Haifa bus 37 suicide bombing. 17 Israelis, including 16 civilians and nine children, killed by a Hamas suicide bomber.
March 16	Rachel Corrie, an American member of the International Solidarity Movement was crushed by an IDF bulldozer, becoming the first ISM member to die in the conflict. Members of the group who witnessed her death alleged murder, while Israel called it a "regrettable accident".
March 19	Mahmoud Abbas appointed Prime Minister of the Palestinian National Authority.
March 24	Hilltop 26, an illegal Israeli settlement near the city of Hebron, was peacefully dismantled by the IDF.
April 30	The Quartet on the Middle East announced the Road map for peace.
May 27	Ariel Sharon stated that the "occupation" of Palestinian territories "can't continue endlessly".
June 2	A two-day summit was held in Egypt. Arab leaders announced their support for the road map and promised to work on cutting off funding to terrorist groups.
June 11	Davidka Square bus bombing. A Palestinian suicide bomber killed 17 Israeli civilians.
June 29	Hamas, Islamic Jihad and Fatah agreed to a three-month cease-fire.
July 9	The International Court of Justice ruled in a non-binding advisory opinion that the Israeli West Bank barrier was illegal under international law, the United Nations had also condemned the construction of the wall as "an unlawful act of annexation". The United States and Australia defended the security fence saying the wall was a counter-terrorism protective measure and that the onus was on the Palestinian Authority to fight terrorism. The U.S., Canada, Israel and some 30 other democratic states objected to the ICJ consideration of the UN General Assembly request, finding the request loaded and prejudicial, and expressing concern of the ICJ's credibility.
August 19	Jerusalem bus 2 massacre. A Hamas Palestinian disguised as a Haredi Jew detonated himself with a bomb spiked with ball-bearings on a bus crowded with children. 23 Israelis were killed and over 130 wounded, all civilians.
September 6	Mahmoud Abbas resigned from the post of Prime Minister.
October 4	Maxim restaurant suicide bombing. A 28-year-old Palestinian female suicide bomber, Hanadi Jaradat, exploded herself inside the Maxim restaurant in Haifa. 21 Israelis (Jewish and Arab) were killed, and 51 others wounded. The restaurant was co-owned by Jewish and Christian Arab Israelis, and was a symbol of co-existence.
=== 2004 ===
January 29	2004 Jerusalem bus 19 bombing. Ali Yusuf Jaara, a 24-year-old Palestinian policeman from Bethlehem, became a suicide bomber and killed 11 Israeli civilians in Jerusalem.
March 14	2004 Ashdod Port bombings. 10 Israeli civilians killed in a suicide bombing. Hamas and Fatah claimed responsibility.
March 22	An Israeli Air Force rocket killed Hamas leader Ahmed Yassin and eleven others in Gaza City.
April 17	An Israeli Air Force rocket killed Hamas leader Abdel Aziz al-Rantissi and two others in Gaza City.
May 2	Murder of Tali Hatuel and her four daughters. Eight-months pregnant woman and her four young daughters ambushed and killed by Palestinian militants.
August 31	Beersheba bus bombings. 16 Israeli civilians killed in a suicide bombing. Hamas claims responsibility.
October 16	Israel officially ended a 17-day military operation, named Operation "Days of Penitence", in the northern Gaza Strip. The operation was launched in response to a Qassam rocket that killed two children in Sderot. About 108–133 Palestinians were killed during the operation, of whom one third were civilians.
November 11	Yasser Arafat died at the age of 75 in a hospital near Paris, after undergoing urgent medical treatment since October 29, 2004.
=== 2005 ===
January 13	Karni border crossing attack. Palestinian terrorists killed 6 Israeli civilians with 200 pound Explosive device, hand grenades, and AK-47 rifles.
February 25	Stage Club bombing. Young Israelis arrived for a surprise birthday party at the Stage Club in Tel Aviv. A Palestinian teenage suicide bomber detonated himself at the entrance to the club. Five Israelis killed, and about 50 wounded. Islamic Jihad claims responsibility.
July 12	HaSharon Mall suicide bombing (July 12, 2005). Five Israeli civilians killed and over 90 injured in a suicide bombing.

== 2005–present: Post-Intifada, Gaza conflict ==
After Israel completely withdrew from Gaza in 2005, Hamas and other militants unleashed a barrage of daily rocket attacks into Israel. The city of Sderot, for example, one mile away from Gaza, was hit by over 360 Qassam rockets within a six-month period after Israel's withdrawal. In June 2006, militants from Gaza tunneled into Israel, killing two soldiers and capturing one. Two weeks later, Hezbollah, supported by Iran and Syria, attacked Israel across the internationally recognized Israeli–Lebanese border, killing eight soldiers and kidnapping two, simultaneously launching a barrage of rockets against civilian towns in northern Israel. Israel responded with a military operation that lasted 34 days. After Hamas fired thousands of rockets at Israeli communities and refused to renew a six-month truce, Israel responded with a military operation against Hamas to protect Israeli citizens. The 22-day operation ended on January 18, 2009. In May 2010, Turkish activists with the Free Gaza flotilla tried to break Israel's naval blockade of Hamas-controlled Gaza. In August 2010, Lebanese soldiers shot and killed an Israeli soldier during routine IDF maintenance on the border. Three Lebanese soldiers and one Lebanese journalist were killed in the exchange of gunfire.

Month, Day	Event(s)
=== 2005 ===
August 7	An IDF deserter and member of the banned Kach group in Israel, Eden Natan-Zada, opened fire on a crowded bus in the Arab town of Shfaram, killing four Palestinians and wounding 22. When he ran out of bullets, the bus was stormed by Arab bystanders and Zaada was beaten to death. PM Ariel Sharon and several Israeli leaders condemned the attack and offered condolences to the families.
August 17	Asher Weissgan shot and killed four Palestinians in the West Bank as a protest against the Gaza disengagement plan.
September 12	Completion of Israel's unilateral disengagement plan. Israel removed all Jewish settlements, many Bedouin communities, and military equipment from the Gaza Strip. Although there was no permanent Israeli presence or jurisdiction in Gaza anymore, Israel retained control of certain elements (such as airspace, borders and ports), leading to an ongoing dispute as to whether Gaza is "occupied" or not. Since the disengagement, Palestinian militant groups have used the territory as a staging ground from which to launch rocket attacks and build tunnels into Israel.
=== 2006 ===
January 25	Hamas won by landslide the majority of seats after the 2006 Palestinian legislative election. Israel, the United States, European Union, and several European and Western countries cut off their aid to the Palestinians; as they viewed the Islamist political party who rejected Israel's right to exist as being a terrorist group.
June 9	Following the Gaza beach blast, in which seven members of one family and one other Palestinians were killed on a Gaza beach, the armed wing of Hamas called off its 16-month-old truce. Israel claimed it was shelling 250 m away from the family's location; Palestinians claimed that the explosion was Israeli responsibility. Some said Israel had not been responsible for the blast or doubted they were. An Israeli internal investigation report claimed the blast was most likely caused by an unexploded munition buried in the sand and not by shelling. This investigation was criticized by Human Rights Watch and The Guardian.
June 13	Israel killed 11 Palestinians in a missile strike on a van carrying Palestinian militants and rockets driving through a densely civilian populated area in Gaza. Nine among those killed are civilian bystanders.
June 25	After crossing the border from the Gaza Strip into Israel, Palestinian militants attacked an Israeli army post. The militants captured Gilad Shalit, killed two IDF soldiers and wounded four others. Israel launched Operation "Summer Rains".
July 5	First Qassam rocket of increased range was fired into the school yard in the Southern Israeli coastal city of Ashkelon. This was the first instance of an increased distance Qassam rockets could reach and the first time a significantly large city had been attacked. No one was injured in this attack.
July 12	2006 Lebanon War: Hezbollah infiltrated Israel in a cross-border raid, captured two soldiers and killed three others. Israel attempted to rescue the captured, and five more soldiers were killed. Israel's military responded, and the 2006 Israel-Lebanon conflict began. The conflict resulted in the deaths of 1,191 Lebanese people and 165 Israelis. Of the Israelis killed, 121 were soldiers and 44 were civilians. It is unclear how many of the Lebanese fatalities were combatants, though Israeli officials reported that an estimated 800 were Hezbollah militants. Approximately one million Lebanese and 300,000–500,000 Israelis were displaced.
July 26	Israel launched a counter-offensive to deprive cover to militants firing rockets into Israel from Gaza. 23 Palestinians killed, at least 16 were identified militants, 76 wounded.
August 14	2006 Fox journalists kidnapping. Palestinian militants kidnapped Fox journalists Olaf Wiig and Steve Centanni, demanding the U.S. to release all Muslims in prison. The two were eventually released on August 27, after stating they had converted to Islam. They both later said that they were forced to convert to Islam at gunpoint.
September	Violence and rivalry erupted between Fatah and Hamas in the Gaza Strip. Mahmoud Abbas tried to prevent civil war. President Mahmoud Abbas and his moderate party advocate a Palestinian state alongside Israel, while Prime Minister Ismail Haniyeh and his Islamist party reject Israel's right to exist.
September 26	A UN study declared the humanitarian situation in the Gaza Strip "intolerable", with 75% of the population dependent on food aid, and an estimated 80% of the population living below the poverty line. The Palestinian economy had largely relied on Western aid and revenues, which had been frozen since Hamas's victory. The situation can also be attributed to Israeli closures, for which Israel and the EU cited security concerns, specifically smuggling, possible weapons transfers and uninhibited return of exiled extremist leaders and terrorists; as well as an extremely high birth rate.
October 11–14	In the midst of an increase of rocket attacks against Israel, the Israeli Air Force fired into the Gaza Strip over a three-day period. 21 Palestinians were killed (17 Hamas militants, 1 al-Aqsa Martyrs' Brigades militant, and 3 civilians). The two dozen wounded included gunmen and passersby. Israel said the offensive was designed to track down the capture soldier and to stop militants firing rockets into Israel. Spokesman Abu Ubaida for Hamas's military wing issued a statement vowing "we will bombard and strike everywhere" in response to the attacks. Makeshift rockets were immediately shot into Israel.
October 20	Brokered by Egyptian mediators, Fatah reached a deal to end fighting between the Hamas and Fatah factions, both groups agreeing to refrain from acts that raise tensions and committing themselves to dialogue to resolve differences. Prime Minister Ismail Haniyeh of Hamas brushed off comments by President Mahmoud Abbas, head of Fatah, who indicated he could dismiss the Hamas-led cabinet. Abbas unsuccessfully urged Hamas to accept international calls to renounce violence and recognize Israel's right to exist.
October 20	Palestinian gunmen (presumably of the Fatah faction) opened fire at the convoy of Prime Minister Haniyeh as it passed through a refugee camp in central Gaza.
November 8	Beit Hanoun November 2006 incident. Amidst ongoing rocket fire, Israel shelled Beit Hanoun, killing 19 Palestinian civilians (seven children, four women) during the Gaza operations. Israeli Prime Minister Ehud Olmert apologised, saying the incident had been an accidental "technical failure" by the Israeli military.
=== 2007 ===
January 19	Israel releases $100 million in tax revenues they had withheld, to cover the humanitarian needs and other basic expenses of the Palestinians. Israel wanted to strengthen Abbas and "keep money out of the hands of the Hamas government".
February	Negotiations in Mecca produced agreement on a Palestinian national unity government signed by Abbas on behalf of Fatah and Khaled Mashal on behalf of Hamas.
March	The Palestinian Legislative Council established a national unity government, with 83 representatives voting in favor and three against. Government ministers were sworn in by Abu Mazen, the chairman on the Palestinian Authority, at a ceremony held simultaneously in Gaza and Ramallah.
May 4	The United States set a timetable for easing Palestinian travel and bolstering Israeli security, including steps like removing specific checkpoints in the West Bank and deploying better-trained Palestinian forces to try to halt the firing of rockets into Israel from Gaza and the smuggling of weapons, explosives and people into Gaza from Egypt. Israel was wary over certain proposals so long as Palestinian militants continued to fire rockets at Israel. The Hamas-led Palestinian government rejected the initiative.
June 7	Battle of Gaza began, resulting in Hamas taking control of the Gaza Strip from Fatah.
November 27	Annapolis Conference in the U.S., a peace conference marked the first time a two-state solution ("two states, Israel and Palestine, living side by side in peace and security") was articulated as the mutually agreed-upon outline for addressing the Israeli–Palestinian conflict. The conference ended with the issuing of a joint statement from all parties, including the U.S., Israel, the Palestinian National Authority, possibly also Arab League, Russia, China, etc..
=== 2008 ===
February 27	Hamas, the Popular Resistance Committees and the Palestinian Islamic Jihad fired a rocket barrage at the Israeli city of Ashkelon and more places, killing one civilian.
February 28	Operation "Hot Winter" was launched in response to rockets fired from the Gaza Strip into Israel. The operation resulted in 112 Palestinians and three Israelis being killed.
May 14	Tony Blair announced new plan for peace and for Palestinian rights, based heavily on the ideas of the Peace Valley plan.
November 4	Israeli troops made a raid on Gaza, in which they killed six members of Hamas. Hamas responded with rocket attacks on southern Israel.
December	Israel launched Operation "Cast Lead" against the Hamas-controlled Gaza Strip, a full-scale invasion of the territory.
=== 2009 === Operation "Cast Lead", launched near the end of the previous year by Israel, continued until January 18. After 22 days of fighting, Israel and Hamas each declared separate unilateral ceasefires. Casualties of the Gaza War are disputed. According to Hamas, they included as many as 1,417 Palestinians including as many as 926 civilians. According to the IDF, 1,166 Palestinians were killed, and 295 were non-combatants. According to the testimonies of three Guardian films, 1,400 Palestinians dead, including more than 300 children (431 Children).
January 13–14	Israeli forces attacked Khoza'a, a small rural community east of Khan Yunis in the south of the Gaza Strip. Missiles containing white phosphorus were deployed.
January 15	Israeli artillery attack hit a UN compound in Gaza, the compound was set ablaze by white phosphorus shells.
March 15	Gunmen killed two Israeli policemen who were traveling in the Jordan Valley on Highway 90, in Masua in the West Bank. The attacks was claimed in an anonymous call said that the attack was behalf of the Imad Mughniyeh Group and Fatah.
April 2	Bat Ayin axe attack. A Palestinian terrorist attacked a group of Israeli children with an axe and a knife, killing one and injuring three.
December 24	Killing of Rabbi Meir Hai. Rabbi killed in a drive-by shooting. Al-Aqsa Martyrs' Brigades claimed responsibility.
=== 2010 ===
January	Two airstrikes against weapons tunnels used to smuggle rockets and militants attempting to fire mortars into Israeli were carried out by the Israeli Air Force, killing 3 militants and wounding another 7. The militants were members of Hamas and the Islamic Jihad Movement in Palestine.
February 10	Tapuah junction stabbing. A Palestinian Authority police officer stabbed an Israeli soldier to death.
February 24	Murder of Neta Sorek. Israeli woman stabbed to death by Palestinian terrorists.
March 4	A suicide bombing in a motorcycle blast in the city of Haifa, leaving one civilian was killed, 12 others were wounded, as well as material damage to a vehicle.
May	Gaza flotilla raid. Turkish activists with the Free Gaza flotilla tried to break Israel's naval blockade of Hamas-controlled Gaza, but were intercepted by the IDF. When the IDF boarded the ship, the activists attacked them with knives and metal rods. Nine Turks were shot dead by IDF gunfire.
August 31	Hamas terrorists shot dead four Israeli civilians near Kiryat Arba, including a pregnant woman.
September 2	2010 direct talks: U.S. launched direct negotiations between Israel and The Palestinian Authority in Washington, D.C.
September 14	2010 direct talks: A second round of Middle East peace talks between Israel and the Palestinian Authority concluded in Sharm El Sheikh, Egypt.
December 18	Murder of Kristine Luken. American woman stabbed to death by Palestinian terrorists. Another woman was severely injured.
=== 2011 === In 2011, Israel deployed the Iron Dome air defence system to shoot down rockets fired by Palestinian militant organizations, such as Hamas, in Gaza.
March 11	Itamar massacre. Two Palestinians infiltrated the town of Itamar and murdered five members of the Fogel family in their beds. Among the victims were three young children, including an infant.
March 23	2011 Jerusalem bus stop bombing. Hamas bombed a bus station in Jerusalem and killed 1 civilian. 39 injured.
April 7	Hamas school bus attack. Hamas militants bombed an Israeli school bus and killed a teenager.
April 14–15	Kidnapping of Vittorio Arrigoni. Vittorio Arrigoni an Italian activist was kidnapped by "The Brigade of the Gallant Companion of the Prophet Mohammed bin Muslima", with the purpose of release of their leader Walid al-Maqdasi, imprisoned by the de facto government in Gaza a month earlier. Arrigoni was found dead in an operation carried out by Hamas authorities in an apartment in Mareh Amer area in northern Gaza.
August 18	2011 southern Israel cross-border attacks. Egyptian and Palestinian militants attacked southern Israel and killed 8 Israelis, including six civilians. 40 injured. Five Egyptian soldiers are also killed.
September	Palestine Authority moved a resolution in UN for recognition of Palestine statehood, calling it a 'Palestine Spring'.
November	Palestine won membership of UNESCO while UN vote on statehood was put off amid no support from France and UK while US had threatened to veto it.
=== 2012 === An annual survey by Shin Bet (AKA the Israel Security Agency (ISA)) concluded that in 2012, the number of terrorist attacks in the West Bank had risen from 320 in 2011 to 578 in 2012, but it was accompanied by a decrease in the number of fatalities. During that same year, 282 attacks were carried out in Jerusalem, compared to 191 in 2011. The increase in attacks was due in part to a 68% rise of attacks using molotov cocktails. However, the number of attacks involving firearms and explosives also grew by 42%—37 compared to 26 in 2011.
January 1	Gaza fired two white-phosphorus-containing mortars into the area governed by the Eshkol Regional Council. The shells landed in an open field and caused no injuries or damage. A complaint about the white phosphorus was subsequently sent to the UN by Israel.
March 9–15	March 2012 Gaza–Israel clashes. Gaza militants launched over 300 rockets, Grad missiles, and mortar shells into southern Israel, wounding 23 Israeli civilians. Israel retaliated with air strikes on Gazan weapons storage facilities, rocket launching sites, weapon manufacturing facilities, training bases, posts, tunnels and terror operatives, killing 22 militants. 4 Palestinian civilians died during the clashes, though some of their deaths were found to be unrelated to Israeli actions.
March 30	It was revealed that the Civil Administration, a unit of the IDF, had over the years covertly earmarked 10% of the West Bank for further settlement.
September 21	September 2012 Egypt-Israel border attack. Militants opened fire on Israeli soldiers and civilian workers. 1 soldier was killed.
November 14–21	Operation "Pillar of Defense". The Israeli Air Force killed Ahmed Jabari, second-in-command of the military wing of Hamas. Israel strikes 1500 sites in Gaza, including rocket launchpads, weapon depots, government facilities and apartment blocks. Gaza officials said 133 Palestinians had been killed in the conflict of whom 79 were militants, 53 civilians and 1 was a policeman and estimated that 840 Palestinians were wounded. Hamas fired over 1,456 rockets at southern Israel, killing 6, including a pregnant woman, and injuring hundreds. Rockets were fired at Jerusalem for the first time and at Tel Aviv for the first time since the first Gulf War. A bus was bombed in Tel Aviv on November 21, wounding 28 civilians. Israel retaliated by bombing hundreds of military sites in the Gaza Strip.
November 29	United Nations General Assembly resolution 67/19, upgrading Palestine to non-member observer state status in the United Nations, was adopted by the 67th session of the UN General Assembly, the date of the International Day of Solidarity with the Palestinian People and the 65th anniversary of the adoption by the General Assembly of resolution 181(II) on the Future Government of Palestine. Vote: For: 138; Abs.: 41 Against: 9.
November 30	In response to the UN approving the Palestinian UN bid for non-member observer state status, the Israeli government inner cabinet announced that it approved the building of housing units in the E1 area, connecting Jerusalem and Ma'aleh Adumim.
December 17	The UN decides that the designation of 'State of Palestine' will be used in all official United Nations documents.
=== 2013 ===
January 15	Four Palestinians were killed by IDF within a week.
January 23	A Palestinian woman was shot dead by an IDF soldier, another wounded.
April 30	An Israeli civilian was killed by a Palestinian; the attacker was wounded.
August 26	Three Palestinian civilians killed during clashes in Kalandia, West Bank.
September 21	An Israeli soldier was abducted and killed by Palestinian in Beit Amin.
September 22	An Israeli soldier was killed by Palestinian sniper in Hebron.
October 1	A Palestinian was killed on Israel–Gaza border by IDF in unclear circumstances.
October 6	A nine-year-old Israeli girl was wounded (condition: "light") in a terror attack in Psagot.
=== 2014 ===
June 12	Eyal Yifrah, 19, Gilad Shaar, 16, and Naftali Frenkel, 16, who also had US citizenship, were killed while hitchhiking home from their religious schools in settlements on the West Bank. For the detailed story: 2014 kidnapping and murder of Israeli teenagers.
June 16	Ahmed Sabarin, 21, got shot and killed by Israeli forces in al-Jalazon refugee camp, during house searches in the West Bank for three missing teens. Israel accused Hamas of being behind the kidnapping of the three Israeli teens in the West Bank. Israeli forces have so far rounded up more than 150 Palestinians, including parliament speaker Abdel Aziz Dweik.
June 20	Israeli forces shot and killed two Palestinians, including a teenager, in clashes that accompanied Israel's search for three students who have been missing for more than a week in the occupied West Bank. Israeli soldiers fired live rounds that killed Mahmoud Jihad Muhammad Dudeen (age 14 or 15). Thousands attended his funeral. An Israeli round also struck Mustafa Hosni Aslan, 22, in the head during a clash near the Qalandiya checkpoint in Ramallah.
June 30	Israeli jets and helicopters launched dozens of air strikes across the Gaza Strip overnight, just hours after the bodies of three abducted Israeli teenagers were found in a shallow grave near the southern West Bank city of Hebron. Following the discovery of the bodies, Netanyahu issued a statement once again blaming Hamas. Hamas denied involvement. Spokesman Sami Abu Zuhri said "Only the Israeli version of the events has been published ... Israel is attempting to make way for aggression against us, against the Hamas ... No Palestinian group, Hamas or any other group, has taken responsibility for the action, and thus the Israeli version can't be trusted."
July 1	In retaliation, to the news about the three abducted Israeli teenagers, 16-year-old Mohammed Abu Khdeir was grabbed off the street after leaving his home in Jerusalem's Arab neighbourhood of Shuafat to go to morning prayers with friends. He was beaten and burned alive. On July 7 it was reported that three Jewish detainees confessed to the crime.
July 17	Thousands of Israeli soldiers backed by tanks initiated an invasion on the Gaza Strip. All border areas under fire. Tank shelling every minute. Northern Gaza town, Beit Lahiya, came under heavy Israeli shelling. "There is the sound of tank shells all the time", said Jamal Abu Samra, 42, a farmer in the area. He said his wife, six children, four brothers and their families were huddling on the ground floor of the family home.
August 3	Shelling by Israel of a United Nations school sheltering some 3,300 displaced people in southern Gaza violating international law according to the United Nations. The school had been designated a protected location and the Israel Defense Forces had been informed 17 times of the precise coordinates of the school's location. 10 people were killed and many injured.
November 14	During a religious prayer service, two terrorists armed with axe and gun burst through the doors of the synagogue Kehilat B'nei Torah in Har Nof, Jerusalem. Several rabbis heroically gave up their lives by striking the radical Islamic terrorists with tables and chairs to allow others to escape. A resident near the synagogue said of the attack, "I would hate to think of what would have happened if my father had not missed prayer time that day."
December 4	Mohammad Hossam Abdel Latif Habali was a 22-year-old mentally disabled Palestinian who was shot and killed by Israeli soldiers on 4 December 2018 in Tulkarm, a city in the West Bank, near the 1967 boundary between Israel and the Israeli-occupied West Bank. Witnesses report that Habali was killed by Israeli forces, and the IDF has not disputed the cause of death. Main article: Death of Mohammad Habali
=== 2023–present ===
On 7 October 2023, Hamas-led militants attacked Israel, killing about 1,200 people and taking some 250 hostages. Israel then launched a major military campaign in the Gaza Strip. The ensuing Gaza war has been described as the deadliest in the history of the conflict.

=== Death timelines ===
Data is from the United Nations Office for the Coordination of Humanitarian Affairs.

== See also ==
- History of the Israeli–Palestinian conflict
- Military operations of the Israeli–Palestinian conflict
- Timeline of the Arab–Israeli conflict
- Outline of the Gaza war
