= List of terrorist incidents in 1994 =

This is a timeline of incidents in 1994 that have been labelled as "terrorism" and are not believed to have been carried out by a government or its forces (see state terrorism and state-sponsored terrorism).

== Guidelines ==
- To be included, entries must be notable (have a stand-alone article) and described by a consensus of reliable sources as "terrorism".
- List entries must comply with the guidelines outlined in the manual of style under MOS:TERRORIST.
- Casualty figures in this list are the total casualties of the incident including immediate casualties and later casualties (such as people who succumbed to their wounds long after the attacks occurred).
- Casualties listed are the victims. Perpetrator casualties are listed separately (e.g. x (+y) indicate that x victims and y perpetrators were killed/injured).
- Casualty totals may be underestimated or unavailable due to a lack of information. A figure with a plus (+) sign indicates that at least that many people have died (e.g. 10+ indicates that at least 10 people have died) – the actual toll could be considerably higher. A figure with a plus (+) sign may also indicate that over that number of people are victims.
- If casualty figures are 20 or more, they will be shown in **bold**. In addition, figures for casualties more than 50 will also be **underlined**.
- Incidents are limited to one per location per day. If multiple attacks occur in the same place on the same day, they will be merged into a single incident.
- In addition to the guidelines above, the table also includes the following categories:

0 people were killed/injured by the incident.
1–19 people were killed/injured by the incident.
20–49 people were killed/injured by the incident.
50–99 people were killed/injured by the incident.
100+ people were killed/injured by the incident.

== List ==
Date	Type	Dead	Injured	Location	Details	Perpetrators	Part of
February 25	Mass shooting	29 (+1)	125	Hebron, West Bank	Cave of the Patriarchs massacre: Israeli Baruch Goldstein killed 29 and injures 125 Palestinian worshippers in an attack in the Cave of the Patriarchs (Ibrahimi Mosque) in Hebron before being killed.	Baruch Goldstein	
February 27	IED	10	60	Zouk Mikael, Lebanon	Church bombing. Samir Geagea, leader of the Lebanese Forces and seven others tried and convicted. Geagea's conviction was later overturned.		
March 1	Mass shooting	1	4	New York City, United States	1994 Brooklyn Bridge shooting: Rashid Baz killed a Hasidic seminary student and wounds four on the Brooklyn Bridge in response to the Cave of the Patriarchs massacre.	Rashid Baz	
March 19	Suicide bombing	14 (+1)	49	Baku, Azerbaijan	1994 Baku Metro bombings: 14 people were killed and 49 injured in the first attack of the Baku Metro bombings.	Lezgin separatists	
April 6	Shootdown, assassination	12	0	Kigali, Rwanda	Assassination of Juvénal Habyarimana and Cyprien Ntaryamira: 12 people, including Rwandan President Juvénal Habyarimana and Burundian President Cyprien Ntaryamira were killed when their airplane was shot down. The shootdown was the catalyst for the Rwandan genocide		
April 6	Suicide car bombing	8 (+1)	55	Afula, Israel	Afula bus suicide bombing: A Hamas suicide bomber detonated his car packed with explosives in front of an Egged bus that was boarding students	Hamas	
April 13	Suicide bombing	5 (+1)	30	Hadera, Israel	Hadera bus station suicide bombing: A suicide bomber detonated, killing 5.	Hamas	
June 27/28	Chemical attack	8	500	Matsumoto, Japan	Matsumoto sarin attack: Members of the Aum Shinrikyo doomsday cult released sarin gas near the homes of several judges who presiding over legal cases involving the cult.	Aum Shinrikyo	
June 16	Mass shooting	3	1	Belfast, Northern Ireland	Three UVF members were killed by the Irish National Liberation Army (INLA) on Shankill Road.	INLA	The Troubles
June 18	Mass shooting	6	5	Loughinisland, Northern Ireland	Six Catholic civilians were killed and five wounded in an Ulster Volunteer Force (UVF) attack at on a pub in County Down.	UVF	The Troubles
July 3	Bombing	13	42	Baku, Azerbaijan	1994 Baku Metro bombings: A bomb exploded on the Baku Metro, killing 13 and wounding 42 in the second attack of Baku Metro bombings.	Lezgin separatists	
July 18	Suicide car bombing	85 (+1)	300+	Buenos Aires, Argentina	AMIA bombing: A suicide bomber rammed his car into the building of the Asociación Mutual Israelita Argentina (Argentine Israelite Mutual Association) killing 85 people. The bombing has never been officially solved, but Argentina, Israel and the United States accused Hezbollah and Iran of being behind the attack and Argentina named 21-year-old Hezbollah operative Ibrahim Hussein Berro as the bomber	Unknown	
July 19	Bombing	21	0	Colón, Panama	Alas Chiricanas Flight 901: a plane was brought down by a bomb shortly after takeoff, killing all 21 people on board, twelve of whom were Jews. The bombing was never solved though an organization calling itself Ansar Allah claimed responsibility and the fact that many of passengers were Jews suggests that the bombing could have been motivated by the Israeli–Palestinian conflict	Unknown	
July 26	Bombings	0	26	London, United Kingdom	1994 London Israeli Embassy attack: The Israeli embassy was severely damaged by a car bomb and twenty people were injured. 13 hours later, the Balfour House, which once housed many Jewish organizations was also bombed, injuring six. Two Palestinian students allegedly linked to Hezbollah were convicted for the bombings.	Hezbollah	
August 18	Mass shooting	18	2	Gingaraba, Chocó Department, Colombia	ELN members massacred 8 soldiers and 11 civilians while burning a bus. Only two women survived.	ELN	
August 28	Shootout	8 (+8)	0	Tamara, Casanare Department, Colombia	7 soldiers and 8 guerrillas died after troops of the 16th Brigade of the Army and 28 and 45 fronts of the FARC clashed in La Picacha	ELN	
September 4	Suicide bombing	12 (+2)	46	Bagratashen, Armenia	1994 Bagratashen bombing: A briefcase bomb planted in crowded market by two ethnic Azeris from Georgia, Imran Huseinov and Turkmen Jafarov, exploded, killing the two perpetrators and twelve others.	Imran Huseinov; Turkmen Jafarov	
September 19	Assassination	1	0	Medellín, Colombia	ELN militants assassinated the president of the First Committee of the House of Representatives, José Arlen Uribe Márquez.	ELN	
October 9	Mass shooting	2	16	Jerusalem, Israel	Nahalat Shiv'a#Terrorist incidents: Two Palestinian policemen who defected to Hamas opened fire on Israelis in the Nahalat Shiv'a neighborhood	Hamas	
October 19	Suicide bombing	22 (+1)	56	Tel Aviv, Israel	Dizengoff Street bus bombing: A Hamas suicide bomber detonated on a bus, killing 22 people and injuring 56.	Hamas	
October 24	Suicide bombing, assassination	3+ (+1)		Colombo, Sri Lanka	Sri Lankan Leader of the Opposition Gamini Dissanayake and MPs Ossie Abeygunasekera, Weerasinghe Mallimarachchi and G. M. Premachandra were assassinated by an LTTE suicide bomber.	LTTE	
November 2	Ambush	13	23	Purace, Cauca, Colombia	Guerrillas of the FARC and ELN, ambush a column of the National Police. A captain, a lieutenant and 9 agents were killed, as were two students in a school bus.	FARC and ELN	
November 9	Suicide bombing, assassination	1 (+1)		Grandpass, Sri Lanka	Former MP Ossie Abeygunasekera was assassinated by a LTTE female suicide bomber	LTTE	
December 11	Bombing	1	10	Minamidaitōjima, Japan	Philippine Airlines Flight 434: A bomb exploded on a plane which was en route from Cebu to Tokyo. The bomb killed one passenger but did not destroy the plane. Ramzi Yousef had planted the bomb on the previous leg of the plane's journey from Manila to Cebu. The bombing was a test run for the later unsuccessful Bojinka plot	Al-Qaeda	
December 24–26	Hijacking	3 (+4)	25	Marseille, France	Air France Flight 8969: Four GIA members hijacked an Air France plane with the intention of crashing it into the Eiffel Tower. However, after killing three passengers, the plane was raided in Marseille by the GIGN and all four hijackers were killed	GIA	
December 25	Suicide bombing	0 (+1)	13	Jerusalem, Israel	A Hamas suicide bomber detonates at a bus stop, wounding 13.	Hamas	

== See also ==
- List of terrorist incidents
