= HaSharon Junction =

HaSharon Junction צומת השרון

Location
- Sharon plain, Israel
- Coordinates: 32°19′24.7″N 34°54′14.3″E
- Roads at junction: Highway 4 Highway 57

Construction
- Type: Intersection

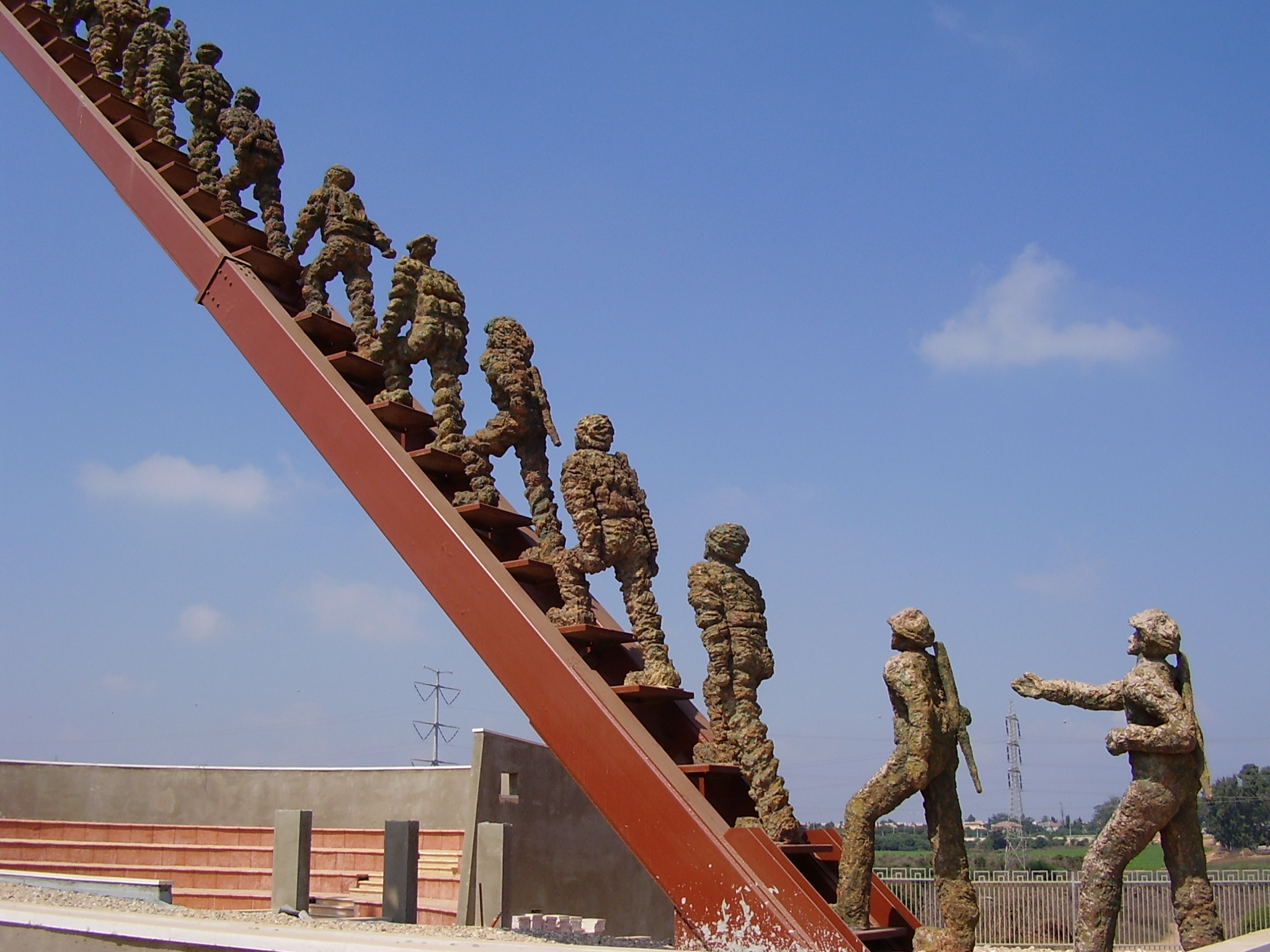
A monument commemorating the victims of the Beit Lid suicide bombing at the junction

The HaSharon Junction (Hebrew: צומת השרון), commonly known as Beit Lid Junction (Hebrew: צומת בית ליד), is a key road junction in the Sharon region of Israel. It intersects Highway 4 and Highway 57. The junction serves as a large transportation hub for dozens of Egged and Kavim buses.

On the southwest corner of the junction is Ashmoret Prison, a civilian jail.

It is planned that in the future, a large interchange will replace the current intersection. It will be located slightly north of the existing junction, along a new alignment of Highway 57, which will be shifted to the north.

== History ==
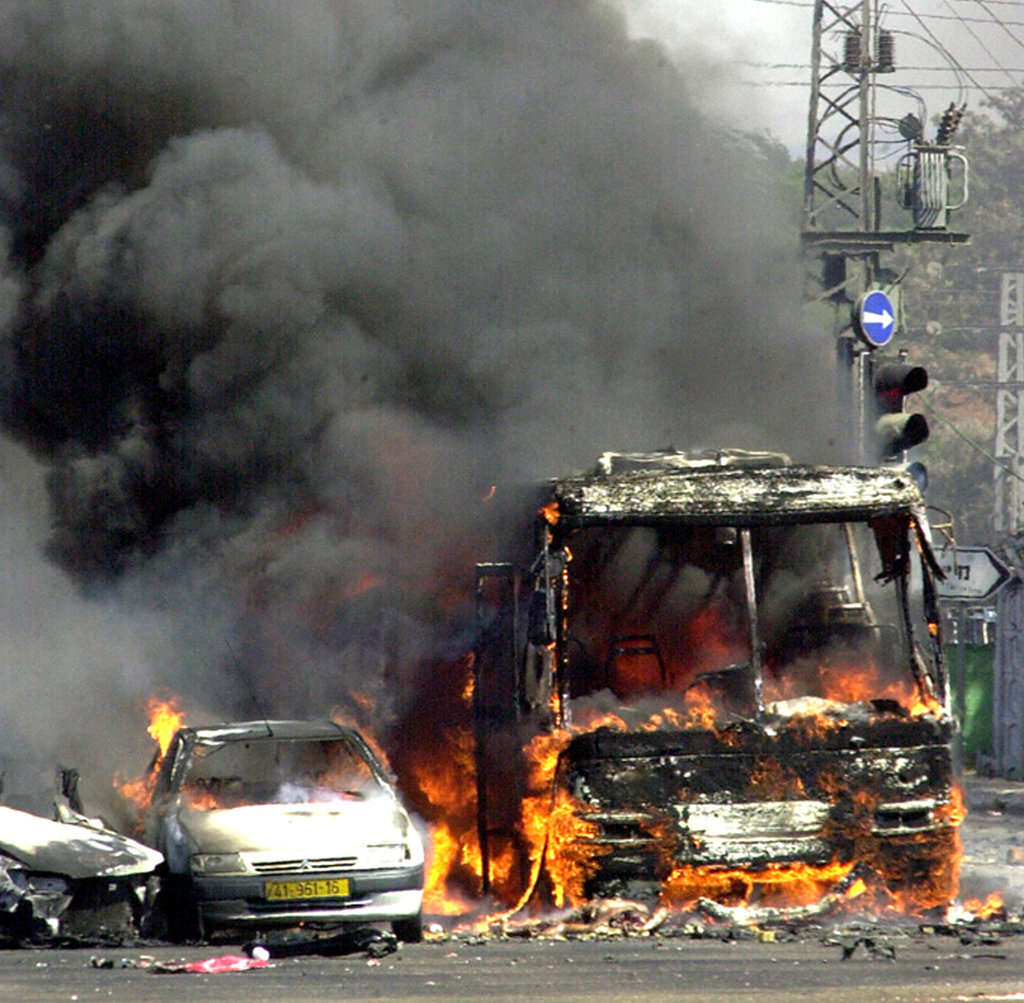
A bus burning after the 2001 bomb attack

In 1995, the Beit Lid suicide bombing attack by the Palestinian Islamic Jihad killed 22 people.

In September 2001, Hamas exploded a suicide car bomb at the junction, injuring 12.

In 2025, eight soldiers were injured in a car ramming attack at the junction.

== Buses ==
The following buses stop at the Beit Lid Junction. The junction itself does not have routes using it as a starting or ending station.

=== Egged ===
Line	Route
641	Tel Aviv CBS - Netanya CBS
821	Afula CBS - Tel Aviv CBS
823	Tel Aviv CBS - Nazareth Illit
921	Tel Aviv CBS - Haifa Hof HaCarmel CBS (both directions)
947	Haifa Hof HaCarmel CBS - Jerusalem CBS

=== Nativ Express ===
Line	Route	Via
35	Netanya CBS - Netanya CBS	Kfar Yona
