= Beit Lid suicide bombing =

Double Palestinian suicide bombing in Israel in 1995

- Part of the Israeli–Palestinian conflict
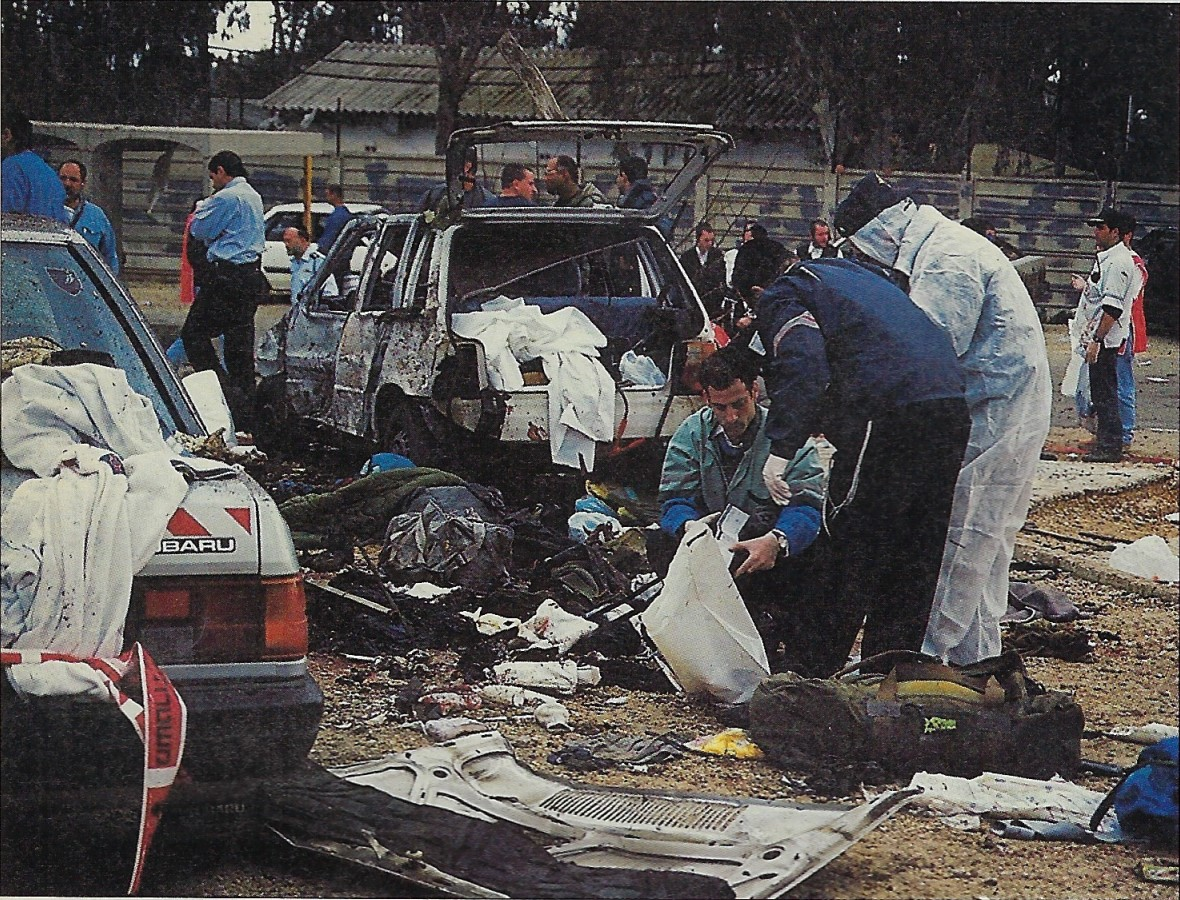
- The attack aftermath

- The attack site
- Native name: הפיגוע בצומת בית ליד
- Location: 32°19′25″N 34°54′14″E; Beit Lid Junction, Highway 4/Highway 57, Netanya, Israel
- Date: January 22, 1995; 31 years ago c. 9:30 am (UTC+2)
- Attack type: Suicide attack
- Weapon: Suicide belts
- Deaths: 23 (including two suicide bombers)
- Injuries: 66 (mostly soldiers)
- Perpetrator: Palestinian Islamic Jihad claimed responsibility
- Assailants: Anwar Soukar & Salah Shaaker
- No. of participants: 2

The Beit Lid suicide bombing, (also named Beit Lid massacre) saw two Palestinian suicide attacks by the Palestinian Islamic Jihad against Israeli soldiers at the Beit Lid Junction on January 22, 1995. 21 soldiers and one civilian were killed. It was the first suicide attack by Palestinian Islamic Jihad.

== Background ==
In 1994, Hani Abed, a Palestinian Islamic Jihad operative, brokered an alliance between Hamas and Palestinian Islamic Jihad. (Hani was later assassinated by Israel). As part of the alliance, Hamas's chief bombmaker, Yahya Ayyash, built the three bombs used by Islamic Jihad for the Beit Lid suicide attack. Each was made using plumber's pipe (one foot long and eight inches (200 mm) wide) and five kilograms of military-grade TNT, surrounded by nails.

The Beit Lid junction is a well-known waypoint towards Netanya. Strategically, it is an important crossroads between Tel Aviv and Haifa located on Highway 4. "On Sunday mornings, Beit Lid was swamped with thousands of young soldiers and aging reservists heading back to military duty from weekend leaves". Ashmoret Prison is located in the southwest corner of the Beit Lid junction. At the time of the bombing, Ahmed Yassin, founder of Hamas, was being held there.

== The attack ==
On 22 January 1995, at approximately 9:30 am, a Palestinian suicide bomber, disguised as an Israeli soldier, approached the bus stop at the Beit Lid junction in central Israel. The bus stop was full of Israeli soldiers who were on their way to their bases after their weekend vacation. The suicide bomber walked into the crowd and detonated the hidden explosives belt he was wearing. About three minutes later a second suicide bomber exploded at the same spot, killing and injuring people wounded in the first explosion, as well as bystanders who had rushed to the scene to assist the victims of the first explosion.

== Aftermath ==
Israeli Prime Minister Yitzhak Rabin toured the bombing site the next day, walking within yards of a kit bag containing a third bomb. Shaaker had left it there for a third suicide bomber, Shahdi Abed al-Rahim, who never made it to the junction. al-Rahim was to have used the bomb to kill Rabin and the Shabak agents accompanying him. The bomb was later recovered, and provided investigators with more evidence implicating Ayyash.

== See also ==
- List of massacres in Israel
- List of terrorist incidents, 1995

== Bibliography ==
- Katz, Samuel. The Hunt for the Engineer. Lyons Press, 2002. ISBN 1-58574-749-1
