= 1994 Bagratashen bombing =

Bombing during the First Nagorno-Karabakh War

- Part of First Nagorno-Karabakh War
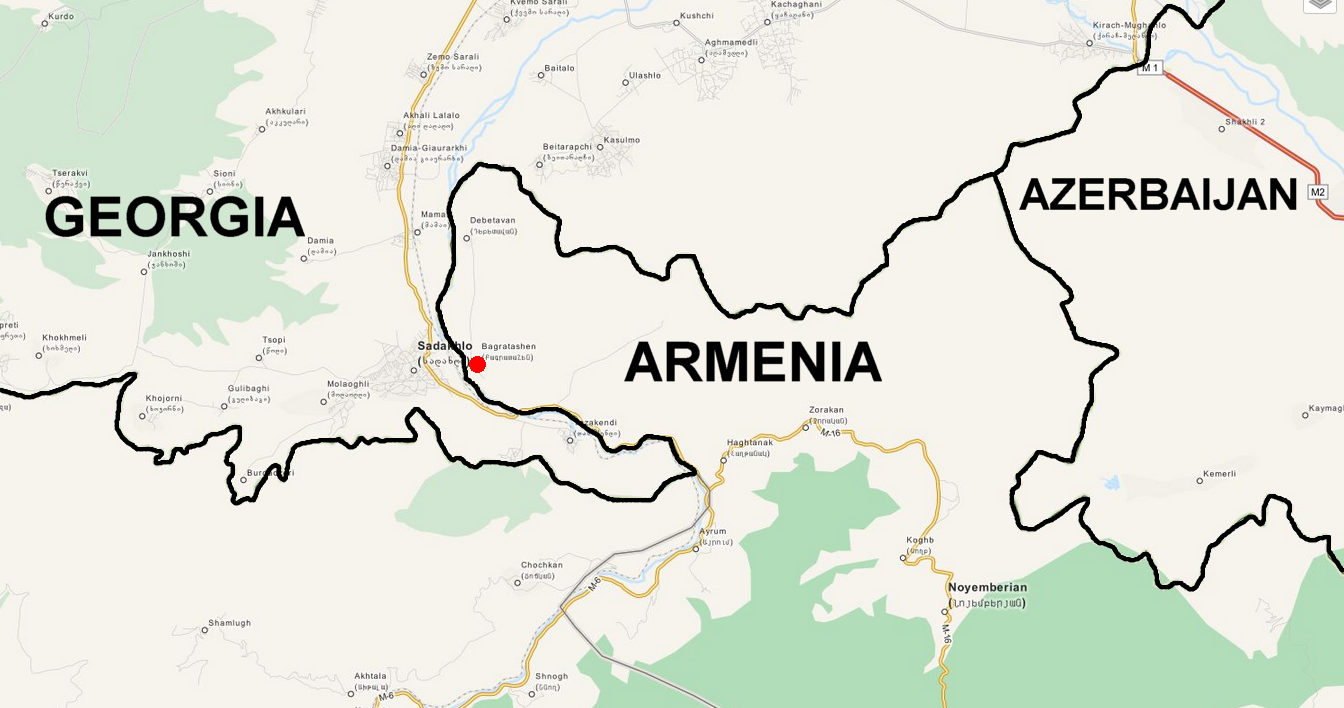
- Location of Bagratashen (red dot)
- Location: Bagratashen, Armenia
- Date: September 4, 1994; 1:00 p.m. (UTC+04:00)
- Target: Armenians
- Attack type: Suicide bombing
- Weapon: Briefcase bomb
- Deaths: 14 (including the two perpetrators)
- Injuries: 46
- Perpetrators: Imran Huseinov; Turkmen Jafarov

A bombing occurred in Bagratashen village market in northern Armenia on September 4, 1994 in which 14 people were killed (including the two perpetrators) and 46 were injured, although initial reports talked about 10 deaths and 26 injuries.

Bagratashen is a large village in Armenia's Tavush province, on the Armenian-Georgian border, not far from Azerbaijan. Sadakhlo, a large Azerbaijani populated village of 10,000, is located on the Georgian side of the border. During the 1990s, after the dissolution of the Soviet Union, the area was "a center of mafia gangs dealing particularly in black-market fuel" because Armenia was under embargo from Azerbaijan, while the Armenian-Turkish border was closed since 1993 due to the conflict with Azerbaijan. Armenia and Azerbaijan were involved in a bloody conflict in the First Nagorno-Karabakh War.

The bombing was perpetrated by Imran Huseinov from Baku and Turkmen Jafarov from the Bula village in the Marneuli Municipality of Georgia. Both were ethnic Azerbaijanis.

According to the local officials, the "explosive device had been planted in a briefcase." The explosion included a wide area.
