= 2010 Tapuah Junction stabbing =

2010 stabbing attack in the West Bank, Palestine

Tapuah Junction stabbing
- The attack site
- Location: 32°06′55″N 35°15′26″E; Tapuah Junction, Road 60, West Bank
- Date: 10 February 2010
- Attack type: Stabbing
- Deaths: 1 soldier
- Assailant: Palestinian Authority police officer Muhammad Hatib
- No. of participants: 1

On 10 February 2010, Palestinian Authority police officer Muhammad Hatib stabbed Druze Israeli soldier Ihab Khatib to death as the latter was sitting in a jeep at a traffic light. The attack was considered part of an "emerging trend" at the time, involving assaults on Israelis by members of the Palestinian Authority security services.

== Background ==
Peter Lerner, spokesman for the Israeli military in the West Bank, said that it was "extraordinary that a Palestinian policeman would carry out such an attack." The attack took place in an area controlled by Israeli police, not in an area where the Palestinian police had authority. It is one of a number of attacks and thwarted Arab terrorist attacks that have taken place at Tapuach Junction, located south of Nablus.

The attack came amid rising tension between Palestinians and Israeli settlers in the West Bank. In the preceding months, settlers were accused of having launched attacks on their Palestinian neighbors, including setting vehicles, homes, and a mosque on fire.

According to Isabel Kershner, this attack took place at a "delicate time" when Israeli and Palestinian security services were attempting to build "mutual trust." This incident together with the killing of Rabbi Meir Hai a month earlier, in which Palestinian police were implicated, raised concerns that Palestinian Authority police might use their weapons to attack Israeli soldiers, Israeli civilians, or both. The Boston Globe called this attack unusual since although violent attacks had at one time been frequent in the West Bank, they had become "relatively rare" since Palestinian Police had taken increased responsibility for security.

However, an unnamed Israeli official told the press that Palestinian Authority Prime Minister Salam Fayyad was "actively encouraging Palestinians to use popular resistance against Israel." Israeli columnist Caroline Glick argues that this attack was the result of Palestinian Authority President Mahmoud Abbas's ongoing "incitement against Israel," rhetoric that "encourages his own forces to attack Israelis." Writing in Haaretz, security analyst Avi Issacharoff described the attack as part of an "emerging trend," a series of attacks on Israelis carried out by Palestinian security personnel, including the killing of Killing of Rabbi Meir Hai two months earlier, caused by incitement to terrorism by members of the Palestinian Authority government.

Following the attack, IDF Samaria Brigade commander Col. Itzhik Bar stated that since the beginning of 2010, IDF troops had foiled 20 stabbing attacks and uncovered 12 bombs.

== Attack ==
Ihab Khatib, a Druze Israeli policeman, was on his way from Jenin to a military outpost near Tapuah Junction, and was sitting alone in his jeep with the window open, waiting at a traffic light. Hatib, wearing civilian clothes, approached, pulled out a knife, reached through the window and thrust the knife into Khatib, who tried to escape by pressing down on the gas pedal, but his jeep flipped over on the side of the road when he lost consciousness. Hatib tried to flee by car, but Yossi Margalit, a security officer for the Rechelim settlement who was nearby, rammed his own car into him, causing light wounds. Hatib was arrested by Israeli soldiers and given medical attention. He was then transferred to the Shin Bet for questioning. Sergeant Khatib was rushed to Rabin Medical Center in Petah Tikva, but died of his wounds. He was buried the following day in his home village.

== Victim ==
St.-Sgt. Maj. Ihab Khatib (alt. Ihab Chattib; aged 28) was a Druze Arab non-commissioned logistics officer in the Kfir Brigade. He hailed from the mainly Druze village of Maghar in the Galilee. He was survived by his parents and five siblings. Khatib's uncle had been killed in action while serving in the Israel Defense Forces during the 2006 Lebanon War, and his aunt had been killed when a Katyusha rocket fired by Lebanese militant group Hezbollah hit her house.

== Perpetrator ==
Muhammad Hatib (alt. Mahmoud al-Khattib; Mahmoud Yusef Nimer Hattib) 34-year old Palestinian police officer. At the time of the incident, he was the head of bureau for the Palestinian Authority's chief of Police in Ramallah. Hatib was dressed in civilian clothing at the time of the attack. Israeli Brigadier General Nitzan Alon, who had had contact with the killer shortly after the incident, reported that Hatib had "said he was tired of living" and that the subsequent investigation failed to reveal any signs of "organisational affiliation or of clear ideological reasons", linking the act to militant groups or a larger plot. Israeli media reports suggested "this was an indication Mr. Khatib [sic] may have hoped he would be killed as he carried out the alleged attack." Military sources also reported that Hatib appeared to be pursuing a military target, "since he waited on the side of the road when he could have attacked Israelis at a nearby hitchhiking post."

Hatib was not among the officers trained by the European Union Police Mission for the Palestinian Territories.

MK Ayoub Kara called for the death penalty to be imposed on the assailant.

== Response ==
Palestinian Authority Prime Minister Salam Fayyad issued a "rare" condemnation of the attack, stating that it "conflicts with our national interests", and pledged to take steps to prevent such incidents in the future. However, an Israeli government source said that while the Palestinian Authority had made marked improvements in its security apparatus, it was more hesitant in dealing with extremists in its own movement.

Director-General of the Palestinian Authority Minister of Detainees and Ex-Detainees Affairs, Osama al-Ghoul, demanded that the attacker, Mahmoud Yusef Nimer Hatib, be released from custody in an Israeli hospital, saying, "Of course [he should be released]. We are fighting the Israeli occupied [sic]. This is our land."

The Tapuah Junction was renamed in honor of Staff Sergeant Major Ihab Khatib.

Member of the Knesset Ayoub Kara called on the government "to strengthen our hold in the land of Israel and the state of Israel” by building “a new town right here, where our beloved Ihab fell, a town named after him that will serve as a memorial."

The editorial board of The Jerusalem Post used this stabbing attack to argue for increased security in the West Bank. Residents of Samaria argued that the government's policy of removing of the security checkpoint enabled this murder to happen.

== See also ==
- Killing of Rabbi Meir Hai
- Bat Ayin ax attack
- Tapuah Junction stabbing (2013)
- Majdi Halabi
- 2017 Temple Mount shooting
- Palestinian political violence
