= Ramat Eshkol bus bombing =

1995 suicide bombing in East Jerusalem

- The attack site
- Location: 31°47′57.7″N 35°13′30.7″E; Ramat Eshkol, Jerusalem
- Date: August 21, 1995 c. 7:45 am (GMT+2)
- Attack type: Suicide bombing
- Deaths: 5 civilians and one police officer (+1 bomber)
- Injuries: 107+ (mostly policemen)
- Perpetrator: Hamas claimed responsibility

A Hamas suicide attack was carried out on a city bus in the Ramat Eshkol neighborhood of East Jerusalem on August 21, 1995.

The Palestinian Islamist militant organization Hamas claimed responsibility for the attack.

== The attack ==
Using a bomb designed by Yahya Ayyash, the Palestinian suicide bomber Sufian Jabarin detonated herself at 7:45 am as a commuter bus passed through Ramat Eshkol. Five people (including the bomber) were killed and more than one hundred were wounded. Many of the victims were policemen on their way to work at the national police headquarters and summer students en route to the Mount Scopus campus of Hebrew University. One of the victims was an American teacher from Connecticut who was visiting Israel to gather material for her classes on Israeli history. Another victim was paralyzed from the neck down during the attack and remained attached to a respirator until he died in 2005.
