= Killing of Rabbi Meir Hai =

2009 killing of Israeli settler by Palestinian militants in the West Bank, Palestine

- Location: Highway 57, West Bank (near Shavei Shomron)
- Date: 24 December 2009
- Attack type: drive-by shooting
- Deaths: 1 killed (Rabbi Meir Avshalom Hai)
- Perpetrator: Palestinian assailants. Al Aqsa Martyrs' Brigades claimed responsibility.

On 24 December 2009, three Palestinian gunmen opened fire on a vehicle near Shavei Shomron in the West Bank, killing an Israeli settler. The Imad Mughniyeh Group, a little-known affiliate of the Al Aqsa Martyrs' Brigades, the armed wing of the Fatah party, claimed responsibility for the attack.

== Attack ==
On 24 December 2009, at around 4:30 PM, Meir Hai drove his minivan out of the village of Einav and headed towards his home at Shavei Shomron. While driving on Highway 57, a group of Palestinian militants driving a golf vehicle drove next to Hai's vehicle and opened fire at him, apparently with an automatic weapon, hitting him in the head with 10 bullets. Hai's vehicle swerved to the side of the road.

The attackers fled the scene and abandoned their vehicle near the village Asira ash-Shamaliya after setting it on fire. A team of Magen David Adom paramedics was urged to the scene. They found Hai in his car, unconscious, bleeding massively, with no pulse and not breathing. After resuscitation efforts, the paramedics team pronounced his death.

According to an anonymous Israel Defense Forces officer, a week before the attack, Israel had removed a traffic-monitoring roadblock about 150 metres (490 ft) from where Hai was shot. The attackers apparently fled to Asira ash-Shamaliya. through the point where the roadblock previously stood

== Victim ==
Rabbi Meir Avshalom Hai (alt. Chai) was a 45-year-old Israeli rabbi and father of seven who lived in the Israeli settlement of Shavei Shomron located in the northern West Bank, where he had lived for 14 years before his murder. Hai was a Torah teacher and principal at the Shavei Shomron school.

Hai was the son-in-law of the former Immanuel mayor Eliyahu Merav and was also a well-known member of the Bratslav Hassidic community.

== Perpetrators ==
The Imad Mughniyeh Group, a little-known affiliate of the Al Aqsa Martyrs' Brigades, the armed wing of Palestinian President Mahmoud Abbas' Fatah party, claimed responsibility for the attack. The group said its members "withdrew from the area safely." It also warned of "a series of attacks to come."

The three militants involved in the killing were:

- Raed Sarkaji, a Tanzim operative who was released in January 2009 from an Israeli prison after serving a seven-year sentence on terror charges;
- Anan Subuh, an Al-Aqsa Martyrs' Brigades operative pardoned by Israel as part of a 2007 deal, under which 400 Fatah militants handed in their weapons, promised to cease their terror activity, and in return were assured that the IDF would stop pursuing them; and
- Raghan Abu Sharah.

== Response ==
=== Israeli response ===
On 26 December, IDF Duvdevan Unit and Nahshon Battalion troops conducted an operation in separate locations in Nablus to locate three of the Fatah Al-Aqsa Martyrs' Brigades operatives who were determined by the Shin Bet to be behind the attack: Raghsan Abu Sharah, Raed a-Sarkaji and Anan Sabah. The fourth suspect reportedly turned himself in to Israeli authorities prior to the operation.

Short confrontations took place at the homes of Abu Sharah and a-Sarkaji. IDF forces used different methods including shots in the air in order to make the two surrender. Both refused, though Abu Sharah sent out his wife. In the third location, where Sabah was staying, a several-hour-long standoff included the firing of an antitank missile toward the house, in an attempt to force Sabah out. All three were shot dead by Israeli troops following their refusal to surrender.

An M16 rifle seized from Sabah was later identified by a police forensics lab as the weapon used in the attack. Sabah had been released from an Israeli prison as part of the amnesty deal with the Palestinian Authority in 2007, in which Israel agreed not to hunt down Palestinian gunmen who agreed to lay down their arms. Major Peter Lerner, spokesman for Israel's Central Command, stated that all three had been involved in anti-Israel violence in the past through activities in the Aksa Martyrs Brigades.

The following day, Israeli Prime Minister Benjamin Netanyahu stated at the start of the weekly cabinet meeting:

I want to praise the Shin Bet and the IDF on the speedy operation against the cell which murdered Rabbi Meir Hai. Our policy against terrorism is clear. We will continue to respond aggressively – against any attack on Israeli citizens and against any firing of rockets or missiles at Israeli territory.

Palestinian Prime Minister Salam Fayyad condemned the Israeli operation as an "assassination" and "an attempt to target the state of security and stability that the Palestinian Authority has been able to achieve." The Al-Aqsa Martyrs' Brigades threatened a quick response to the operation, stating: "This is a despicable ... We will not stand idly by and the holy warriors' blood will not be shed in vain. The enemy will see nothing but the language of blood and fire. It [the enemy] will pay for the crime … the response will be quick."

Hai's killing was cited in newspaper editorials demanding greater security for Israelis in the West Bank.

The Yesha Council stated that:

the murderous shooting attack in Samaria is a direct result of the policy of lifting restrictions on the Palestinians, removal of necessary road blocks in Judea and Samaria and the transfer of the responsibility for security to those whose ranks produced many terrorists who murdered Jews. As in the case of similar incidents in the past, once again the gestures aimed at [Palestinian President Mahmoud Abbas] Abu Mazen carry a price tag of Jewish blood.

Israeli Member of Knesset Michael Ben-Ari, from the far-right National Union party, said that "the path of capitulation, the opening of arteries, the [settlement] freeze and the release of [Palestinian] prisoners that [Prime Minister Benjamin] Netanyahu has brought down upon us signals to terrorists that Jewish blood is negligible. The terrorist probably thinks that he will be released in the next exchange."

Israeli Interior Minister Eli Yishai, Justice Minister Yaakov Neeman, and Members of Knesset Yaakov Katz and Uri Ariel attended Hai's funeral. Yishai stated that "Hundreds and thousands of children are crying over the loss of the rabbi," referring to the Jewish learning institutes Hai had set up.

=== Palestinian Authority response ===
On 25 December, the Palestinian Authority stated that its security forces had rounded up, interrogated and released some 150 suspects in connection with the attack. According to an Israel Radio report, most of the suspects were residents of Tulkarem. Sources in the IDF lauded the conduct of the Palestinian security establishment in its response to the killing of Hai, calling it "determined and impressive."

Fatah officials warned that the killing of its operatives could trigger a third intifada, which would be directed not against Israel but against the (Fatah-controlled) Palestinian Authority. During the funerals of the three men, thousands of Palestinians chanted slogans accusing the PA of collusion with Israel and calling for the dismantling of the PA. The funerals were described by a local journalist as "one of the biggest anti-Palestinian Authority demonstrations" in many years. Fatah named a soccer tournament in honor of the militants, called the "Martyrs Raed Al-Sarkaji, Anan Subh, Ghassan Abu Sharakh, and Haitham Al-Naana Ramadan Football Championship" as reported in the Palestinian newspaper Al-Hayat Al-Jadida.

== See also ==
- Palestinian political violence
- Tapuah Junction stabbing (2010)
