= Afula bus suicide bombing =

1994 Palestinian terrorist attack against civilians in Israel

- The attack site
- Location: 32°36′43″N 35°17′17″E; Afula, Israel
- Date: 6 April 1994; 32 years ago 12:15 pm (GMT+2)
- Attack type: Suicide attack
- Deaths: 9 (including perpetrator)
- Injuries: 55
- Perpetrators: Hamas, PIJ claimed responsibility
- Motive: Revenge for the Cave of the Patriarchs massacre

The Afula bus suicide bombing was carried out on 6 April 1994, at a bus stop next to an Egged bus in the center of Afula, Israel. Eight Israeli civilians were killed in the attack and 55 were injured. Hamas and PIJ claimed responsibility for the attack.

This was the first of the Palestinian suicide attacks to be carried out by Palestinian militants against Israeli civilians in Israel,^{[i]} and was carried out in retaliation for the killing by a settler of 29 Muslims while they were at prayer in the Ibrahimi mosque in Hebron on 25 February.

== Preparations for the attack ==
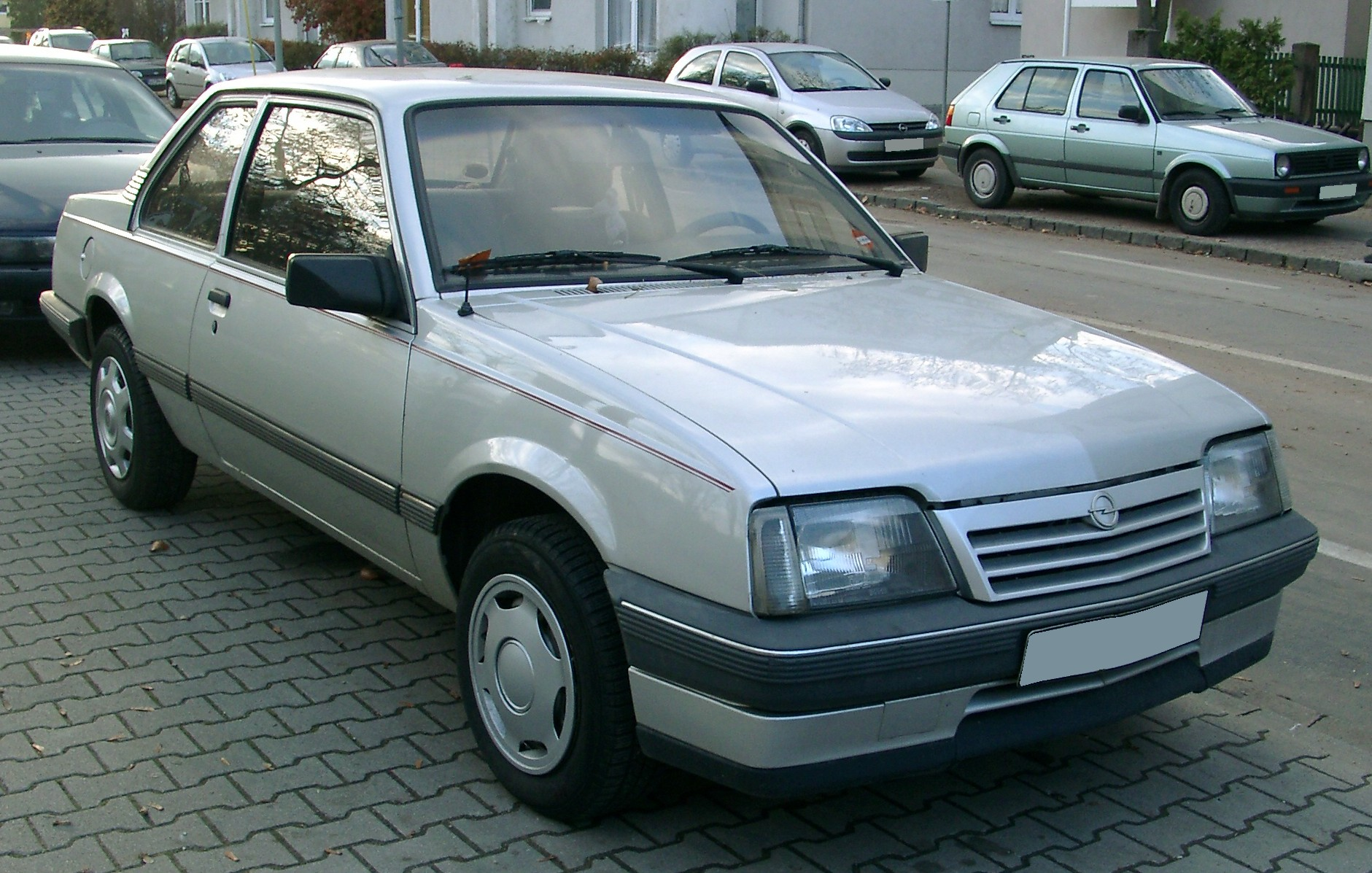
An Opel Ascona C, similar to the 1987 Opel Ascona C used to carry out the attack

The Afula bus suicide bombing attack was planned by Hamas chief bombmaker Yahya Ayyash, who began to plan suicide bombings within Israel in 1992.

Ayyash rigged a 1987 Opel Ascona with seven gas cylinders, five anti-personnel hand grenades, and wrapped the bomb in a rucksack containing 1,100 carpenter nails. A caller to a Western news agency in Jerusalem said the car was carrying 385 pounds of explosives. The car, which had Israeli license plates that did not belong to it, had been stolen in Tel Aviv on 23 March.

== The attack ==
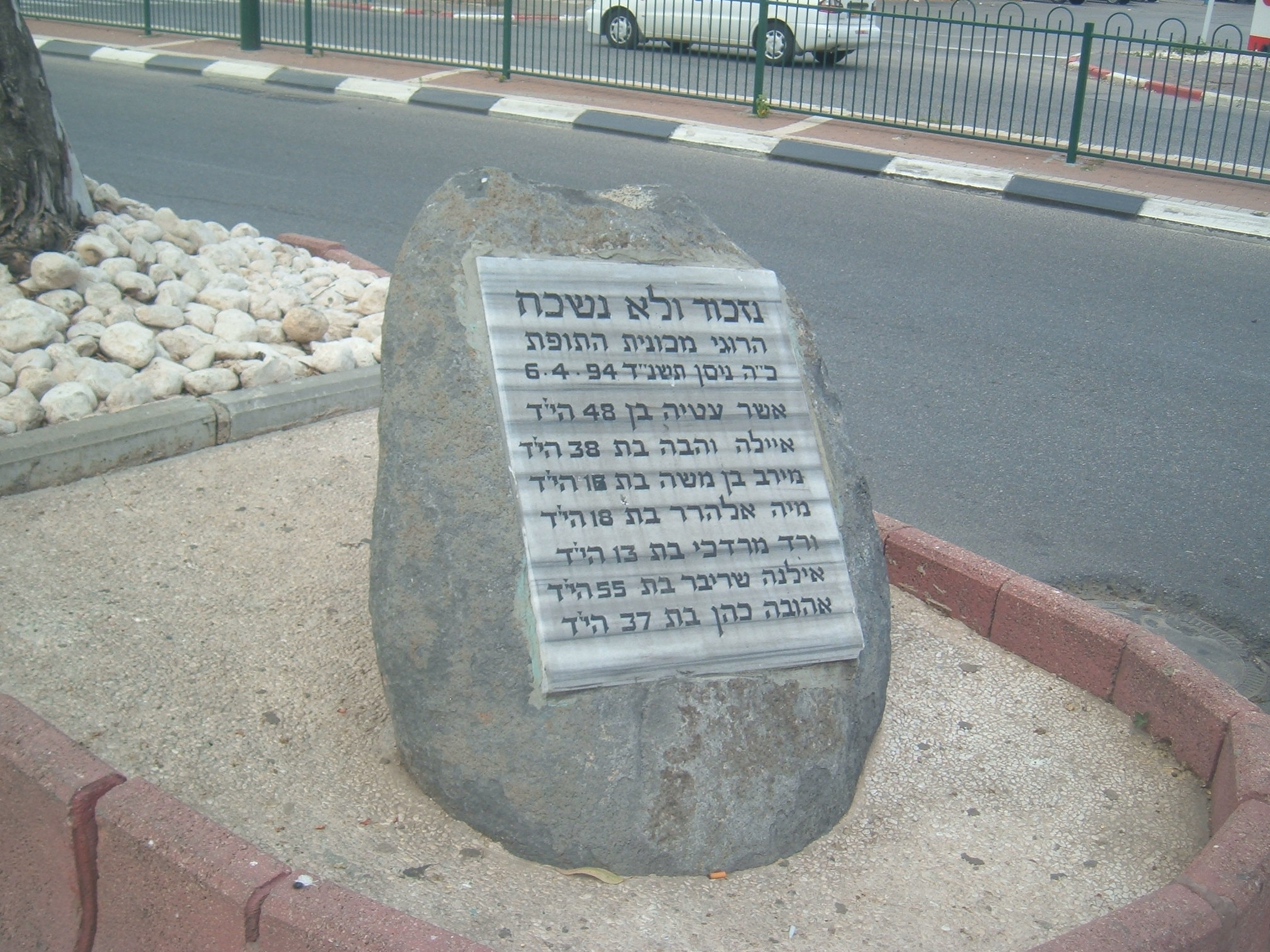
The memorial built at the site of the attack in memory of the victims of the attack

Around 12:10 pm, during Holocaust Memorial Day, a Palestinian suicide bomber drove a vehicle full of explosives into the division nine street in downtown Afula. Two nearby schools had just ended classes for the day, and young Jewish students streamed toward the approaching bus for home.

The suicide bomber stopped his vehicle next to an Egged commuter bus line number 348 and detonated the explosives device as the bus was boarding passengers at the bus stop, which was crowded with people. According to witnesses, a firefighter who was the first on the scene said that the street was covered with oil, seared metal and nails.

A 23-year-old survivor who had been reading a newspaper about the on-going Oslo peace negotiations saw "a big rolling fire." He ran away, ripping off his burning clothes as he went. An ambulance driver reported that "people were charred, lacking limbs, lacking heads ... ." Tree branches were ripped off and windows were shattered at a nearby kindergarten.

Among the mostly Jewish victims were several Arabs, including one of the fatalities.

== The perpetrators ==
A few hours after the blast, Hamas issued a communique stating that the bombing was carried out by a 19-year-old Palestinian named Ra'id Zaqarna, who originated from the village of Qabatya in the West Bank and who was a member of the Abdel el-Rahman Hamadan militant cell of the Izz ad-Din al-Qassam Brigades.

Zaqarna drove to the intersection of Afula's 9th Brigade (Hativa Tesha) street, and pulled in front of the #348 bus. As a group of Israeli students boarded the bus, Zaqarna detonated the bomb. Israeli media reports said that he had previously served time in prison and was on an Israeli army list of fugitive members of Hamas's extremist armed wing. Police said they found a banner denouncing the Oslo peace process, and a Koran, the Islamic holy book, near the debris of the car.

== Motivation ==
Hamas publicly declared that the attack was one of 5 planned to retaliate for the Cave of the Patriarchs massacre in which the Hebron settler Baruch Goldstein machine-gunned 29 Muslims dead at prayer, wounding another 125. Hamas, after conducting a second attack on 13 April, the Hadera bus station suicide bombing, Hamas desisted from undertaking the other three it had planned, when Israel quickened its schedule for withdrawing its military from the Gaza Strip soon after.

Then Shin Bet head's advisor on Palestinian affairs Matti Steinberg explained that Hamas had until then refrained from attacking civilian targets inside Israel, and the change in this policy was a result of Goldstein's massacre. Hamas itself has repeatedly stated that it initially did not intend to attack Israeli civilians, but only did so after the Cave of Patriarch's massacre. Hamas leader Rantissi further stated, "when Israel stops killing Palestinian civilians, we will stop killing Israeli civilians."

== See also ==
- Palestinian political violence
- Afula ax attack
- 1994 Brooklyn Bridge shooting

== Footnotes ==
- ^iThe first suicide car bomb attack took place at the Mehola Junction bombing in the West Bank on 16 April 1993. "A year later, on 6 April 1994, Hamas carried out its first successful suicide car bomb attack in Israel proper when a car packed with nearly 400 pounds of explosives detonated beside a bus picking up students in the Israeli town of Afula ..."
