= Dizengoff Street bus bombing =

1994 suicide attack against civilians in Tel Aviv, Israel

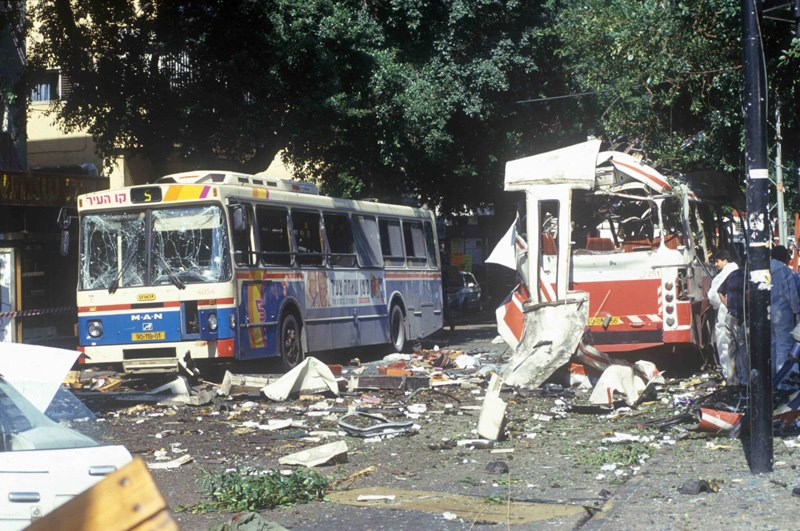

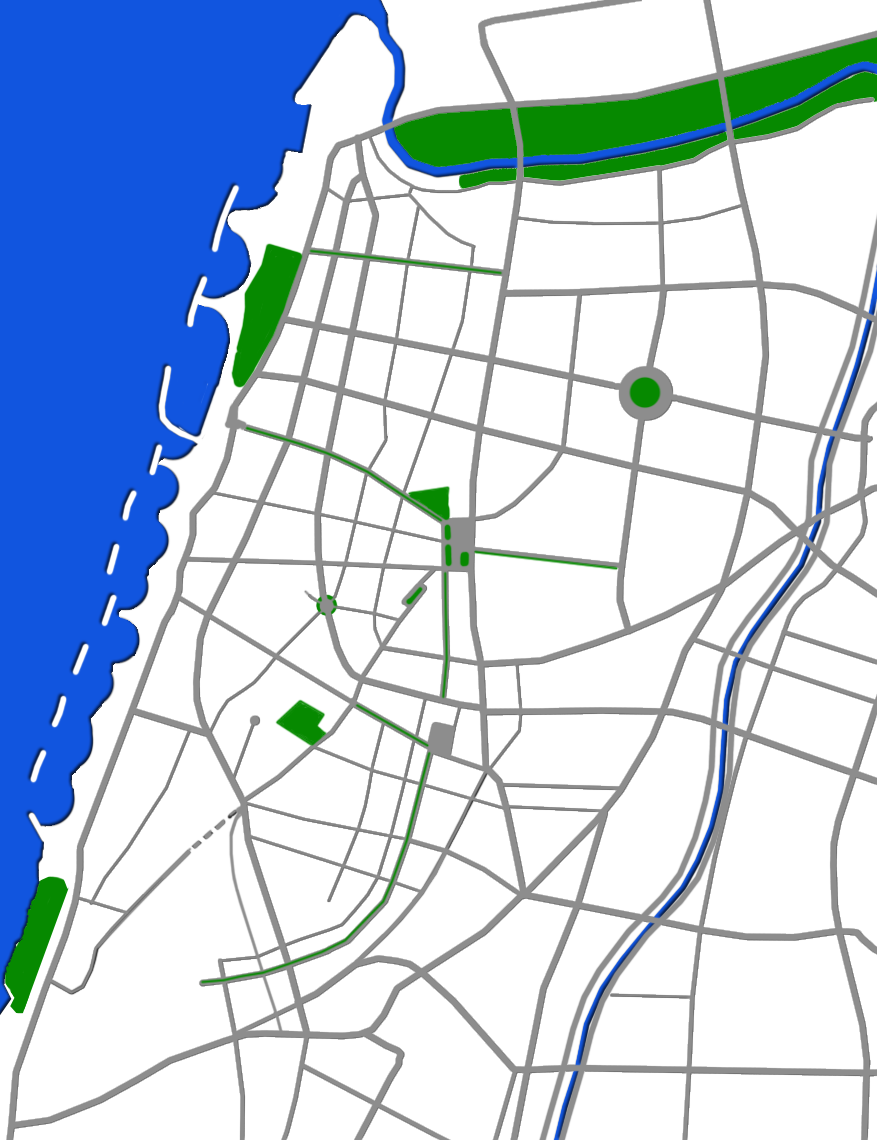
- Location: 32°4′44″N 34°46′26″E; Dizengoff Street, Tel Aviv, Israel
- Date: October 19, 1994; 32 years ago c. 9:00 am (UTC+2)
- Attack type: Suicide attack
- Deaths: 23 (including the perpetrator)
- Injuries: 104
- Perpetrator: Hamas claimed responsibility
- Assailant: Saleh Abdel Rahim al-Souwi
- No. of participants: 1

The Dizengoff Street bus bombing was a Hamas suicide attack on a passenger bus driving down Dizengoff Street, Tel Aviv in 1994. At that time, it was the deadliest suicide bombing in Israeli history, and the first successful attack in Tel Aviv. 22 civilians were killed and 50 were injured. The attack was planned by Hamas chief Yahya Ayyash, a week before the signing of the Israel-Jordan Treaty of Peace.

== Background ==
Yahya Ayyash was disappointed that the previous attack he orchestrated, the Hadera central station suicide bombing, had killed only six Israelis. The bomb used in that attack had been small and made of acetone peroxide, a relatively weak explosive. For the attack on bus five, Ayyash constructed a bomb using an Egyptian land mine packed with twenty kilograms of military-strength TNT, surrounded by nails and screws. TNT is not readily available in the Palestinian territories, but Hamas had managed to acquire some by smuggling it in or purchasing it from Israeli organized crime. The device "was one of the best ever built by Ayyash."

Qalqilya resident Saleh Abdel Rahim al-Souwi was selected for the attack. Al-Souwi joined Hamas after his older brother Hasin was killed in 1989, in a shootout with Israeli forces. Al-Souwi was wanted by the Israeli Shabak, but was not considered a high priority. The day before the attack, al-Souwi taped a statement saying "It is good to die as a martyr for Allah" and "Sages end up in paradise".

== Attack ==
Muatab Mukadi, a member of Ayyash's Samaria battalion (of the Izz ad-Din al-Qassam Brigades), drove al-Souwi to one of the bus's first stops. al-Souwi chose an aisle seat on the left side of the bus, and placed the bomb (stored in a brown bag) at his feet.

At approximately 9:00 AM, as the bus was slowing down for a stop 100 metres north of Dizengoff Square, al-Souwi detonated the bomb killing 21 Israelis and one Dutch national. The powerful explosion lifted the bus off its chassis and the heat melted the fiberglass bus frame. Limbs were projected like missiles into the seating area of nearby restaurants.

Following the explosion, a crowd of demonstrators descended on the bomb site chanting "Death to the Arabs". "Police arrested scores of Arab suspects in and around the blast area, though most of them were detained to save them from the crowd's anger."

== Aftermath ==
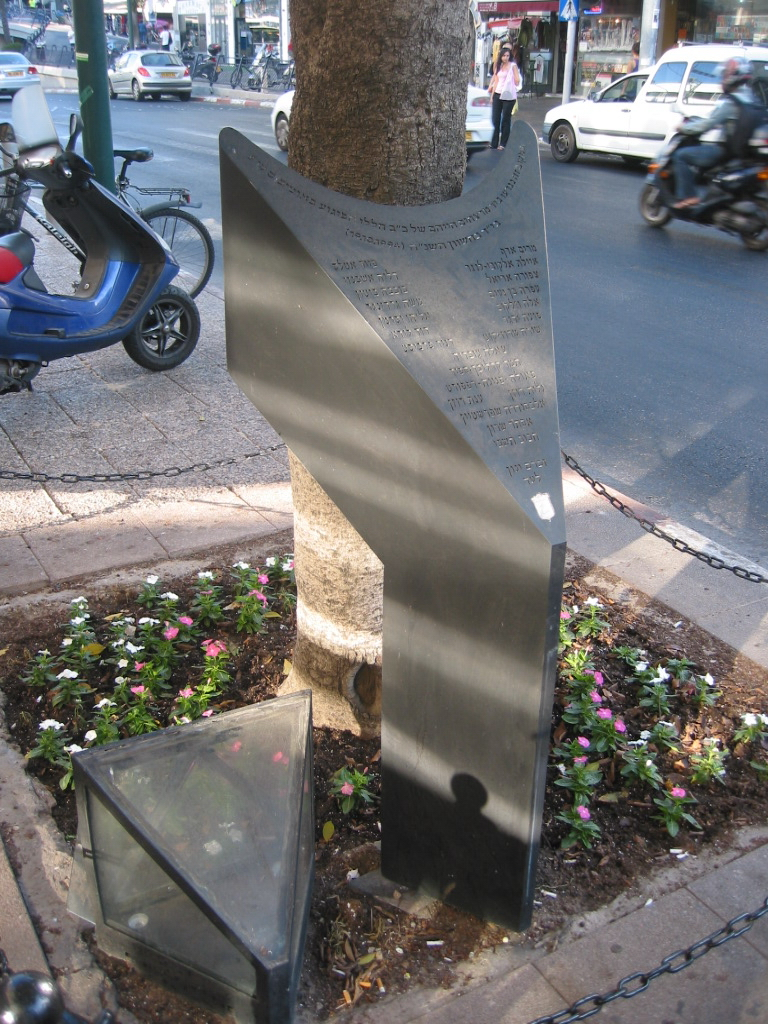
Memorial to victims of the attack

Israeli police quickly identified al-Souwi as the perpetrator. The day after the bombing, with his identity confirmed using DNA, al-Souwi's family threw a neighborhood party celebrating his "martyrdom." That afternoon, the Israel Security Agency (ISA) destroyed the house, after giving the family one hour to remove their possessions.

== Sources ==
- Katz, Samuel (1999). The Hunt for the Engineer: How Israeli Agents Tracked the Hamas Master Bomber. New York: Fromm International. ISBN 0-88064-243-2.
