= Afula axe attack =

1994 attack on an Israeli soldier by a Palestinian Hamas militant

- The attack site
- Native name: רצח ליאת גבאי
- Location: 32°36′34″N 35°17′26″E; Afula, Israel
- Date: 30 November 1994; 31 years ago
- Attack type: Axe murder
- Weapon: Pickaxe
- Deaths: 19-year-old Israeli soldier (Liat Gabai)
- Perpetrator: Hamas
- Assailant: Wahib Ali Abu Roub

The Afula axe attack was a 1994 attack by a Palestinian member of Hamas on a 19-year-old female Israeli soldier who was on her way home from the artillery base in which she served, in the downtown area of Afula, near the town's police station. The attacker hit her head from behind with an axe. The attack, which shocked the Israeli public, was one of the more prominent axe attacks at that time, which signified to many in the Israeli public a deterioration to their personal security at the time. The attacker was sentenced to life imprisonment, was released in the Gilad Shalit prisoner exchange, but was returned to prison after he resumed militant activity. He is currently serving a life sentence.

== Preparations for the attack ==
On 30 November 1994, the day of the attack, Wahib Ali Abu Rub decided that he would attempt to attack an IDF soldier in Afula that same day. As a result, he bought a pickaxe in Jenin. Afterwards he boarded a taxi in Jenin, which took him to Israel. According to the Israeli police, the taxi managed to evade the checkpoints of the IDF and Israeli police forces by driving on dirt roads in the Ta'anakh region located south of Israel's Jezreel Valley.

== The attack ==
Abu Rub entered the Israeli town of Afula and proceeded to a main downtown street, near the city's police station, where he approached a 19-year-old female Israeli soldier from behind. The soldier, Liat Gabai, was on her way back home from the military base in which she served to attend a memorial service for her grandmother.

The assailant hit Gabai in the head with the pickaxe several times before she fell to the ground with the axe stuck in her head. He was immediately captured by bystanders.

== Subsequent events ==
=== Victim ===
After the attack Gabai was rushed in critical condition to the HaEmek Medical Center in Afula. Gabai died of her injury two hours after the attack and was buried in the military cemetery in Afula on 1 December 1994. Liat was posthumously promoted to the rank of sergeant.

=== In Afula ===
Immediately after the attack, fearing a revenge attack, extensive Israeli military and police forces escorted various Arab workers in the city back to their homes outside the city, while angry Jewish residents gathered in the streets.

=== Attacker ===
The attacker, an unemployed Palestinian, 25-year-old Wahib Abu Rub from Qabatiya, was a member of the Islamist militant organization Hamas. He was sentenced to life imprisonment.

On 18 October 2011, Abu Rub was released after having served 17 years of his sentence as part of the Gilad Shalit prisoner exchange between Israel and Hamas. He was arrested and returned to prison in 2014. Israeli authorities claimed that he had returned to terrorist activities. A special judicial committee ruled that Abu Rub had breached the conditions of his release and that he should serve his full sentence for Gabai's murder. The Nazareth District Court rejected an appeal by Abu Rub and upheld the committee's decision.

== Reactions ==
Israeli Prime Minister Yitzhak Rabin condemned the attack but said that violence would not stop the Middle East peace talks.

During the mid-2000s (decade), Israeli singer Shay Gabso recorded the song "You tell me" (תגידי לי את) written in memory of Liat Gabai, with the assistance of Lt. Col. Yair Ben-Shalom who was Gabai's commander.

== See also ==
- Afula bus suicide bombing
- Palestinian political violence
