= Yahya Ayyash =

Palestinian militant and bombmaker (1966–1996)

- يحيى عياش

3rd Commander of the Izz al-Din al-Qassam Brigades
- In office November–December 1993 – 5 January 1996
- Preceded by: Emad Akel
- Succeeded by: Adel Awadallah

Personal details
- Born: 6 March 1966 Rafat, Rafat, Jordanian-ruled West Bank
- Died: 5 January 1996 (aged 29) Beit Lahia, Gaza Strip
- Cause of death: Assassination
- Education: Birzeit University (BSc)
- Nickname: The Engineer

Yahya Ayyash (Arabic: يحيى عياش, romanized: Yaḥyā ʿAyyāš, pronounced [jaħjaː ʕajːaʃ]; 6 March 1966 – 5 January 1996) was the chief bombmaker of Hamas and the leader of the West Bank battalion of the Izz ad-Din al-Qassam Brigades. In that capacity, he earned the nickname "the Engineer" (Arabic: المهندس, romanized: al-Muhandis). Ayyash is credited with advancing the technique of suicide bombings against Israel by Palestinian militant groups. The bombings he orchestrated killed approximately 90 Israelis, many of them civilians. He was assassinated by the Shin Bet on January 5, 1996, through a booby-trapped mobile phone.

Ayyash is celebrated by local Palestinian communities who have named streets and other locales in his honor. His name was also given to the rocket Ayyash-250 produced by Hamas.

== Early life ==
Ayyash was born in Rafat on 6 March 1966, the eldest of three brothers. As a child, he received an award from the Islamic Trust for his talent in memorizing the Quran.

As a boy, Ayyash's hobby was repairing radios and television sets. After graduating from high school in 1985, he entered Birzeit University in 1987. He received a Bachelor of Science degree in electrical engineering in 1991.

Described as "well educated, ambitious, and soft-spoken," Ayyash hailed from a relatively affluent family. He was married with one child. He planned to study for a master's degree in Jordan, but soon after being denied a student visa, he joined Hamas.

== Work for Hamas ==
Ayyash built the bombs used in a number of Hamas suicide attacks: the Mehola Junction bombing, the Afula Bus massacre, the Hadera central station massacre, the Tel Aviv bus 5 massacre, the Egged bus 36 bombing, the Ramat Gan bus 20 bombing, and the Jerusalem bus 26 bombing. As part of a strategic alliance between Hamas and Palestinian Islamic Jihad, Ayyash built the bombs used by Islamic Jihad at the Beit Lid massacre.

Unable to obtain TNT and other high explosives in the Palestinian territories, Ayyash used readily available household products such as a combination of acetone and detergent. When combined, these substances form acetone peroxide, an explosive known as "Mother of Satan" for its instability.

Ayyash came to the attention of Israeli security forces after a failed bombing attempt in Ramat Ef'al. Following a high-speed chase, three would-be Hamas suicide bombers were arrested by police. When police inspected their car, they found it rigged with a bomb—five 12-kilogram (26 lb) gasoline tanks filled to capacity, connected to an acetone peroxide-based detonator. After evacuating the area, sappers used a robot armed with a shotgun to shoot the detonator in the hopes of defusing it but it blew up, causing a massive explosion. Police investigators said that if this had happened in a crowded area, hundreds would have been killed. Under interrogation, the three bombers revealed Ayyash's identity.

== Assassination ==
After the assassination of Yitzhak Rabin, the Palestinian Authority began to cooperate more closely with the Shin Bet. The Shin Bet learned that Ayyash often spent the night in the Gaza City home of Osama Hamad, a childhood friend whose uncle, Kamil Hamad, was known to the authorities.

In October 1995, Kamil Hamad met with Shin Bet operatives, demanding money and Israeli identity cards for himself and his wives. After they threatened to inform on him, he agreed to cooperate. Shin Bet agents gave him a cell phone and told him it was bugged so they could listen in on his conversations. They did not tell him that it also contained 15 grams of RDX explosive. Hamad gave the phone to his nephew Osama, knowing that Ayyash regularly used Osama's phones.

At 08:00 on 5 January 1996, Ayyash's father called him and Ayyash answered. Overhead, an Israeli plane picked up their conversation and relayed it to an Israeli command post. When it was confirmed that it was Ayyash on the phone, Shin Bet remotely detonated it, killing him instantly. He was in Beit Lahia at the time.

Israel did not confirm or deny its role in killing Ayyash, which led to rumors and speculation about the extent of Israeli involvement.

In 2012, former Shin Bet director Carmi Gillon confirmed the story in the documentary The Gatekeepers. Kamil Hamad disappeared and it is rumored that he received US$1 million, a fake passport and a visa to the US.

=== Aftermath ===
Following Ayyash's death, four suicide bombings killed seventy-eight Israelis in February and March 1996. The first of these took place shortly after the end of the 40-day mourning period for Ayyash and the cell that claimed responsibility called itself "Disciples of the martyr Yahya 'Ayyash", stating it was a revenge attack for his assassination. Israeli security services who later interrogated one of the organizers of the attacks said they were carried out by a sub-group of the Qassam Brigades, and that, "the attacks were most probably a direct reaction to the assassination of 'Ayyash [with] no far-reaching political goal."

On 9 January 2026, Ayyash's widow, Hiyam, was arrested and detained in Nablus by Israeli forces after accusing her of using "inciteful language" against Israel online.

== Legacy ==
The Militant, a newsweekly associated with the Socialist Workers Party (United States), reported that "100,000 Palestinians... attended the funeral". Yasser Arafat, president of the Palestinian National Authority (PA), offered his condolences to Hamas leaders. In a speech soon after the death, Arafat praised Ayyash as a martyr and blamed Israel for his assassination.

In April 2010, Israel's Channel 10 reported that the Palestinian Authority named a street in Ramallah after Ayyash. The future presidential compound of the PA is being built on the street. Only a few weeks earlier, a square in Ramallah was named after the Palestinian militant Dalal Mughrabi who directed the 1978 Coastal Road massacre. PA sources said the PA did not intend to name the street after Ayyash. The Ramallah Municipality stated that the street name had been chosen at the end of the 1990s shortly after Ayyash's death.

In response, Israel, the United States and Canada condemned the Palestinian Authority. The Israeli Prime Minister's Office called it an "outrageous glorification of terrorism by the Palestinian Authority" while a U.S. State Department spokesperson stated "we also strongly condemn the glorification of terrorists. Honoring terrorists who have murdered innocent civilians either by official statements or by the dedication of public places hurts peace efforts and must end."

The PA had previously named streets in Jenin and Beit Lahia as well as square in Jericho in honor of Ayyash.

== Bibliography ==
- Gunning, Jeroen (2008). Hamas in politics: democracy, religion, violence. Columbia University Press. ISBN 978-0-231-70044-3.
- Katz, Samuel (2002). The Hunt for the Engineer. Lyons Press. ISBN 1-58574-749-1.
- Rosaler, Maxine (2003). Hamas: Palestinian Terrorists. The Rosen Publishing Group. ISBN 978-0-8239-3820-9.
- Rubin, Barry (1999). The Transformation of Palestinian Politics: From Revolution to State-Building. Harvard University Press. ISBN 0-674-00071-4.
