= Ramat Gan bus bombing =

1995 suicide attack

Ramat Gan bus 20 bombing
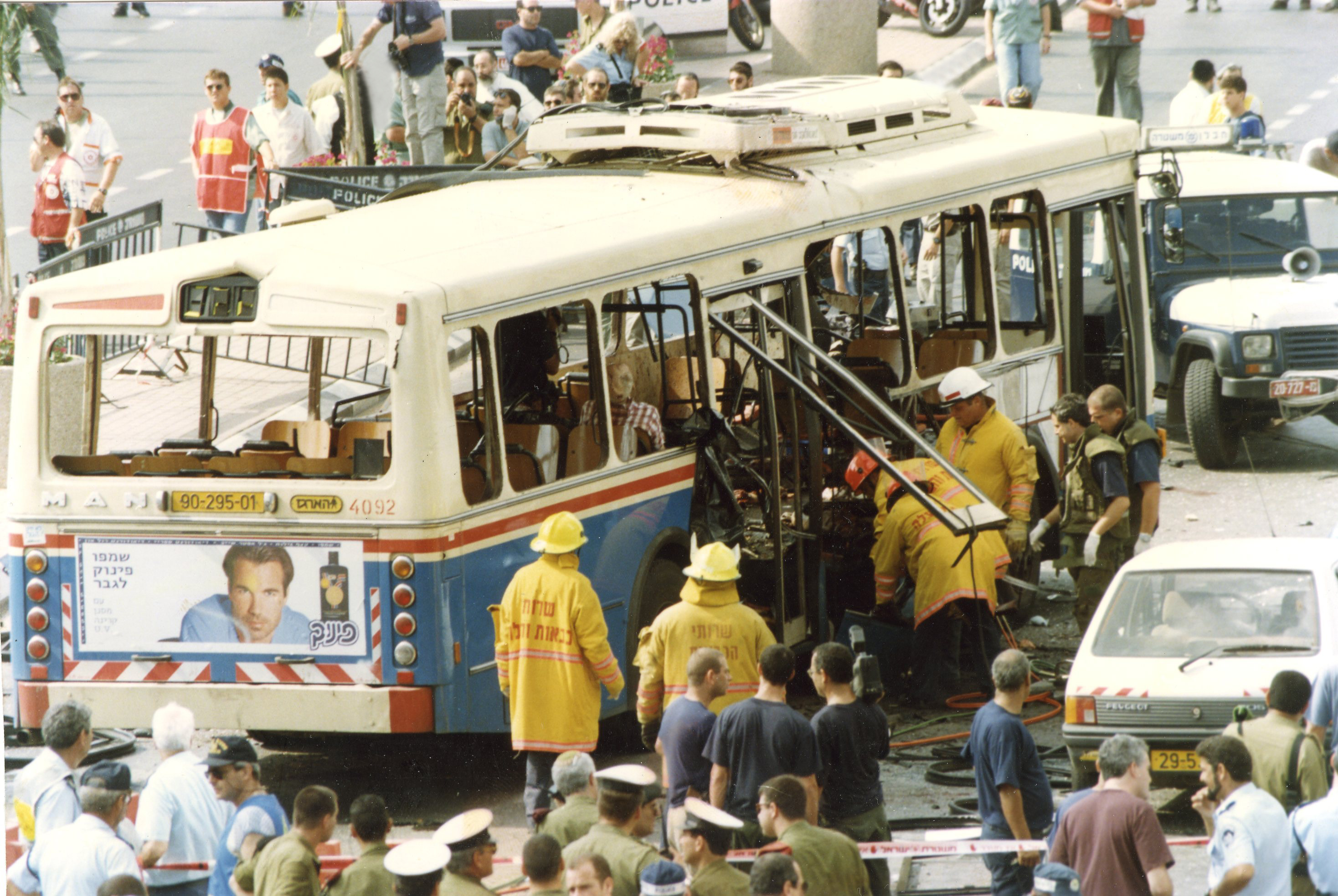
- The attack aftermath

- The attack site
- Native name: הפיגוע בקו 20 ברמת גן
- Location: 32°05′03″N 34°48′12″E; Abba Hillel Street, Ramat Gan, Israel
- Date: July 24, 1995; 31 years ago c. 8:40 am (GMT+2)
- Attack type: Suicide attack
- Weapon: 15 kilograms (33 lb) explosive device
- Deaths: 6 Israeli civilians (+1 bomber)
- Injuries: 33 Israeli civilians
- Perpetrator: Hamas claimed responsibility

The Ramat Gan bus bombing was a Hamas suicide attack on a crowded No. 20 commuter bus in Ramat Gan, Israel on July 24, 1995, near the Israel Diamond Exchange. Six Israelis were killed and 33 were wounded. The bomb contained 15 kilograms (33 lb) of TNT packed with nails into a metal pipe.

== The perpetrator ==
Just after 9:00 am, a call came in to the Associated Press office in East Jerusalem claiming responsibility for the attack. The caller boasted that a youth from Hamas from the Yahya Ayyash group from the West Bank carried out the attack".

== See also ==
- Palestinian political violence
