= Mehola Junction bombing =

1993 Palestinian suicide car bomb attack in the West Bank

- The attack site
- Location: 32°22′15″N 35°30′29″E; Mehola Junction, West Bank
- Date: April 16, 1993; 33 years ago c. 1:00 am (UTC+2)
- Attack type: Suicide bombing
- Weapon: Car bomb
- Deaths: 1 civilian (+1 bomber)
- Injuries: 7–9
- Perpetrator: Hamas claimed responsibility
- Assailant: Shahar al-Nabulsi

The Mehola Junction bombing was the first suicide car bomb attack carried out by Palestinian militants and took place on 16 April 1993.

Hamas bombmaker Yahya Ayyash rigged a Volkswagen Transporter using three large propane tanks and explosives collected from grenades and other ordnance. The bomb was connected to a detonator switch in the driver's controls.

Hamas operative Saher Tamam al-Nabulsi drove the car to Mehola Junction, a rest area on the Jordan Valley Highway in the West Bank. Just after 1:00 am, the car exploded between two buses, one civilian and one military. The blast killed al-Nabulsi and Marwan Ghani, a Palestinian from the nearby village of Bardala who worked in a snack bar in Mehola. Ghani's brother and eight Israeli soldiers were slightly injured.

An investigation conducted after the attack revealed that several weeks before the attack, on March 15, 1993, the terrorist ran over and killed Avish Yaakov Barakha, a resident of Har Brakha, and Ofer Cohen. It was also revealed that the terrorist wanted to carry out the attack within the Green Line territories, but IDF checkpoints prevented him from reaching there.
