= Hadera bus station suicide bombing =

1994 suicide bombing in Hadera, Israel

Hadera central station suicide bombing
- The attack site
- Location: 32°26′7″N 34°54′49″E; Hadera, Israel
- Date: April 13, 1994 c. 9:40 am (GMT+2)
- Attack type: Suicide attack
- Deaths: 5 (+1 suicide bomber)
- Injuries: 30
- Perpetrator: Hamas claimed responsibility
- Assailant: Amar Salah Diab Amarna
- No. of participants: 1
- Motive: Revenge for the Cave of the Patriarchs massacre

The Hadera bus station suicide bombing was a 1994 Hamas suicide attack on a passenger bus departing from the central bus station in Hadera for Tel Aviv, Israel. As a result, five civilians were killed and 30 injured. The attack came exactly one week after another Hamas bus suicide bombing attack in Afula. Both attacks were motivated officially by Hamas as retribution for the Cave of the Patriarchs massacre conducted against Muslim worshippers in February by Baruch Goldstein. The attack took place on the Israeli Fallen Soldiers and Victims of Terrorism Remembrance Day.

Hamas bombmaker Yahya Ayyash built a bomb using two kilograms of home-made acetone peroxide explosive. Twenty-one-year-old Amar Salah Diab Amarna, a native of Ya'bad in the West Bank, was selected for the mission.

On the morning of April 13, 1994, Amarna boarded the 9:30 am bus to Tel Aviv. At 9:40 am, as the bus was pulling out of the station, Amarna placed the bag containing the bomb on the floor of the bus, "where shrapnel could rip through vital arteries in the groin area," and detonated it.

As Israeli rescue workers converged on the scene of the explosion, a second pipe bomb exploded. Hamas later claimed responsibility for the attack.

== Bibliography ==
- Katz, Samuel (2002). The Hunt for the Engineer. Lyons Press. ISBN 1-58574-749-1.
