= List of Black September attacks =

From its foundation in 1971 until 1981, Black September carried out a number of terrorist attacks against Israeli and Jordanian targets around the world. It also inspired a number of "copycat" and solidarity actions, as well as hoaxes.

== 1971 ==
=== August ===
- August 24, Madrid: A bomb placed in the rear lavatory of a Jordanian Alia Airliner, parked on the airport tarmac, blows a hole in the aircraft fuselage. This attack is sometimes credited to Black September, as well as Fatah members, although it is uncertain if the group was fully operational.

=== September ===
- September 9, Jordan: A bomb planted by Black September damages part of the Trans-Arabian Pipeline near the Jordanian-Syrian border. Black September bombs the pipeline a second time on September 17.

=== November ===
- November 11, Amman: Black September bombs the Intercontinental Hotel in Amman, Jordan, targeting American citizens.
- November 28, Cairo: Prime Minister of Jordan Wasfi Tel is assassinated by Black September operatives. First time a claim of responsibility is reported.

=== December ===
- December 15, London: Black September attempts to assassinate Zaid Rifai, Jordanian ambassador to the United Kingdom. He is injured but survives.
- December 15, Geneva: a parcel bomb sent to Jordan's UN Mission in Geneva explodes while police attempt to examine it. The blast injures three people.

== 1972 ==
=== February ===
- February 6, Ravenstein, Netherlands: oil tankers owned by Gulf Oil were set on fire by explosions. Black September claims credit for the attack, claiming they targeted Gulf Oil for aiding Israel.
- February 6, Brühl, North Rhine-Westphalia, Germany: five Jordanians suspected of spying for Israel are murdered near Cologne by Black September operatives.
- February 8, Hamburg: The Streuber Motor factory is bombed. The factory made electrical generators used in Israeli aircraft.

=== May ===
- May 8, Vienna: Sabena Flight 571 is hijacked by Black September members and forced to land in Tel Aviv. Israeli commandos storm the plane after it lands. One passenger and two hijackers die in the resulting gun battle.

=== August ===
- August 5, Trieste: a joint Black September – Popular Front for the Liberation of Palestine operation blew up one of six oil tanks, causing $7 million worth of damage. They claimed they did it because the facility supplied oil to Austria and West Germany.
- August 16, Rome: an El Al flight was interrupted after a bomb allegedly hid in a phonograph machine blew a hole in the baggage compartment. The Nationalist Youth Group for the Liberation of Palestine took credit, but some believed Black September was the culprit.

=== September ===
- September 5, Munich: Munich massacre – Eight members of Black September take 11 Israeli athletes hostage. A bungled rescue attempt by German authorities leads to the deaths of all 11 hostages, five Black September members, and a West German police officer.
- September 11, Brussels: Ophir Zadok, an official at the Israeli embassy was lured to a local café by a man claiming knowledge of a terrorist attack against the embassy. He was shot by two assailants. Black September was suspected.
- September 16, Amsterdam: 64 mail bombs are mailed from Amsterdam to various Israeli targets in Europe, the Americas, Australia and Africa.
- September 19, London: Dr. Ami Shachori, the agricultural attache at the Israeli Embassy in London is killed after opening one of the Black September letter bombs personally addressed to him. He reportedly believed the package contained Dutch flower seeds he wanted to plant when he got home. The blast exploded on his desk and the official was killed when a large wooden splinter drove through his heart. Theodore Kaddar, who had recently arrived to succeed Schechori, was also injured.
- September 19, London: Israeli security agents search the mail and find four letter bombs addressed to members of the embassy staff, and four addressed to Ambassador Michael Comay
- September 19, London: four letter bombs addressed to members of the staff at the Israeli embassy are found at a London post office. One of the letters opened by the police contained a note from Black September.
- September 19, Paris: the Israeli embassy discovered two letter bombs.
- September 20, London: eight more letter bombs are addressed to Israeli officials are intercepted.
- September 20, Ottawa: six letter bombs were addressed to Israeli officials were discovered.
- September 20, Montreal: a letter bomb addressed to the Israeli consul general Pinchas Shanaan was discovered.
- September 20, New York: three letter bombs addressed to Israeli officials were discovered at a post office, addressed to Yosef Tekoah, the Israeli ambassador to the UN, Jacob Barrone and Uri Gordon, members of Israels Permanent Mission to the UN.
- September 20, Geneva: five letter bombs addressed to Israeli officials in Austria were discovered.
- September 20, Brussels: a letter bomb addressed to an Israeli official was discovered.
- September 20, Tel Aviv: a letter bomb addressed an Israeli official is found.
- September 20, Jerusalem: a letter addressed to an Israeli official exploded in a post office, injuring a postal worker.
- September 20, Australia: five letter bombs addressed to Israeli officials were discovered.
- September 21, Barranquilla, Colombia: a threat against an American firm is made on behalf of Black September. An intruder is spotted at 1:35 am but is chased away by security guards. Officials regard the incident as a "false alarm".
- September 21, Jerusalem: ten letter bombs were discovered at a post office.
- September 21, Kinshasa, Zaire: an undisclosed number of letter bombs were discovered at the Israeli embassy.
- September 21, Buenos Aires: five letter bombs were discovered at the Israeli embassy.
- September 21, Phnom Penh, Cambodia: a letter bomb was discovered at the Israeli embassy.
- September 22, London: Scotland Yard volunteered to coordinate a global effort to investigate the letter bombs.
- September 23, Amman: Jordanian police discover four of the Amsterdam letter bombs addressed to its officials.

=== October ===
- October 4, Rome: the first of a series of Malaysian postmarked letter bombs was discovered at the office of the United Hias Society. The package contained a note from Black September.
- October 6, Algiers: Palestinian students held hostages in the West German consulate demanding the release of three Black September prisoners. The hostages are released after an hour. The Black September Organization itself does not appear to have been involved.
- October 6, New York: a Malaysian postmarked letter bomb addressed to Hannah Goldberg, former executive director of Hadassah fails to explode when she opens it. The package contained a note from Black September.
- October 10, New York: a Malaysian postmarked letter bomb addressed to Rose Halpern, former president of Hadassah fails to explode when she opens it.
- October 10, Bulawayo, Rhodesia: Malaysian postmarked letter bombs were discovered mailed to Jewish families. One was the mother of Jewish weightlifter John Orkin, a member of the Rhodesian Olympic team. The bombs fail to explode.
- October 10, Colombo, Ceylon: a US embassy official received a telephone assassination threat from a man claiming to be from Black September. It is not known if BSO was really involved.
- October 14, New York: a Malaysian postmarked letter bomb addressed to a former official of Haddassah exploded in the hands of postal clerk William Figueroa, blowing off his right little finger and requiring an operation to remove fragments of the device from his left.
- October 25, Kiryat Shmona, Israel: letter bombs addressed to Richard Nixon, Melvin Laird and William Rogers are intercepted. Israeli official they were mailed either by a local Arab or infiltrators from Lebanon.
- October 29, Beirut: Lufthansa Flight 615 was hijacked. Two perpetrators threatened to blow up the aircraft if the three surviving Black September members responsible for the Munich massacre are not released from custody. The West German authorities decided to comply, flying the Munich attackers to Zagreb where they boarded the hijacked Boeing 727. The Lufthansa plane was forced to fly to Tripoli, where all hostages were released and the Black September members were given a hero's welcoming.
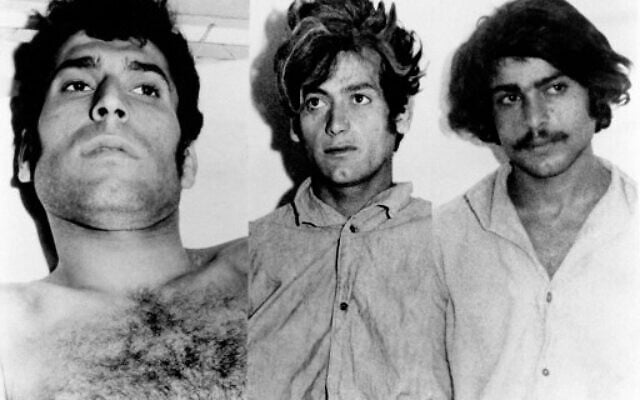
Ibrahim Mosoud Badran, Samer Mohamed Abdulah and Abed Kair al Dnawly 6 September 1972.

Mohammad Abbas

=== November ===
- November 10, Bombay: police intercept 42 letter bombs addressed to Jewish firms in Europe
- November 10, New Delhi: police intercept 10 letter bombs addressed to Jewish firms in Europe
- November 10, Geneva: police intercept five Indian postmarked letter bombs addressed to the Israel Mission to the UN in Geneva and Jewish organizations.
- November 10, London: Mr. Vivian Prins, head of a diamond company that traded with Israel was wounded when an Indian post marked bomb exploded in his face.
- November 10, London, Glasgow: police intercepted twenty letter bombs addressed to Jewish targets throughout Britain.
- November 10, New York: another postal worker was injured while handling an Indian postmarked letter bomb.
- November 10, New York: the head of Haddassah received a letter bomb
- November 10, Amsterdam: a Dutch Jew received a letter bomb
- November 13, Paris: journalist Khodr Kannou was shot by three gunmen. Attack is variously attributed to Black September, who may have been unhappy with a story he was writing or believed him to be a Mossad agent, or part of Mossads assassinations following the Munich massacre.

=== December ===
- December, Cyprus: police foil an alleged Black September plot to hijack a Cyprus to Israel plane
- December 20, Beirut: the US embassy was hit by two anti-tank rockets. Some official attributed the attack to Black September.
- December 24, London: Abdul Karin Fuheid, a Fatah official, is arrested in at an airport on illegal possession of a firearm and fifty rounds of ammunition. Black September demands release of their "courier".
- December 26, Turkey: two Black September operatives were arrested trying to leave the country en route for Paris. Police found explosives, detonators, firing devices and plastic bombs in their car.
- December 28, Bangkok: 1972 Israeli Bangkok Embassy hostage crisis

== 1973 ==
=== January ===
- January, Brookline, Massachusetts: Black September made threats to the families of members of the Israeli consulate.
- January 8, Paris: Black September claimed credit for placing a bomb that destroyed the offices of the Jewish Agency for Israel
- January 20, Vienna: three Black Septemberists were arrested in connection with a plot to blow up Schönau camp for Jewish refugees from the Soviet Union
- January 26, Madrid: Shin Bet officer Baruch Cohen was lured to a café by an Arab contact who promised to provide him information on politically active Arabs in Spain and fatally shot. His assailants fled to an airport and left the country.
- January 27, Austro-Italian border: three more members of Black September were arrested on attempting to enter Italy. They were part of the operation to blow up the Schonau camp.

=== February ===
- February 15, Amman: police arrested Abu Daoud. Daoud was in the midst of an assassination and coup plot against King Hussein of Jordan. A high ranking Black September operative, Daoud provided authorities with extensive information on the group's activities.
- February 21, Israel: a Libyan 727 accidentally flew into Israeli airspace. Aware of Black September threats to crash an airliner into Tel Aviv, the Israeli Air Force shot the plane down, killing 106.

=== March ===
- March 1, Khartoum: Attack on the Saudi Embassy in Khartoum
- March 7, New York: 1973 New York City bomb plot
- March 12, Nicosia: Simha Gilzer, an Israeli businessman, was assassinated in the steps of the Palace Hotel. Black September took credit the following day saying the man was a Mossad officer and had been complicit in the killing of a Black September leader in January.
- March 15, Franco-Italian border: police apprehended Black September operative who were planning attacks against the Israeli and Jordanian embassies.

=== July ===
- July 1 Checy Chse Maryland Colonel Yosef Alon is shot and killed. In his book Chasing Shadows (Palgrave Macmillan), Fred Burton, former deputy chief of the counterterrorism division of the U.S. State Department's Diplomatic Security Service and vice-president of the private intelligence and consulting firm Stratfor, concluded after a lengthy investigation that Alon's killer was an agent from Black September named Hassan Ali who was killed by Mossad in 2011.

=== August ===
- August 5, Athens: 1973 Athens Hellinikon International Airport attack

== 1974 ==
=== February ===
- Three guerrillas armed with pistols and plastic bombs hijacked a Greek freighter holding Greeks as hostages at Karachi, demanding the release of the attackers of the 1973 Hellinikon International Airport at Athens. They eventually released the hostages and in return the Greek government changed the sentences of the Hellinikon International Airport attackers from death to life imprisonment.

== 1981 ==
=== October ===
- October 20, Antwerp: A truck bomb explodes outside a synagogue in Antwerp, Belgium, killing three people and wounding 106. Black September claims responsibility.
