= List of aircraft hijackings and attacks on aircraft by Palestinian militant groups =

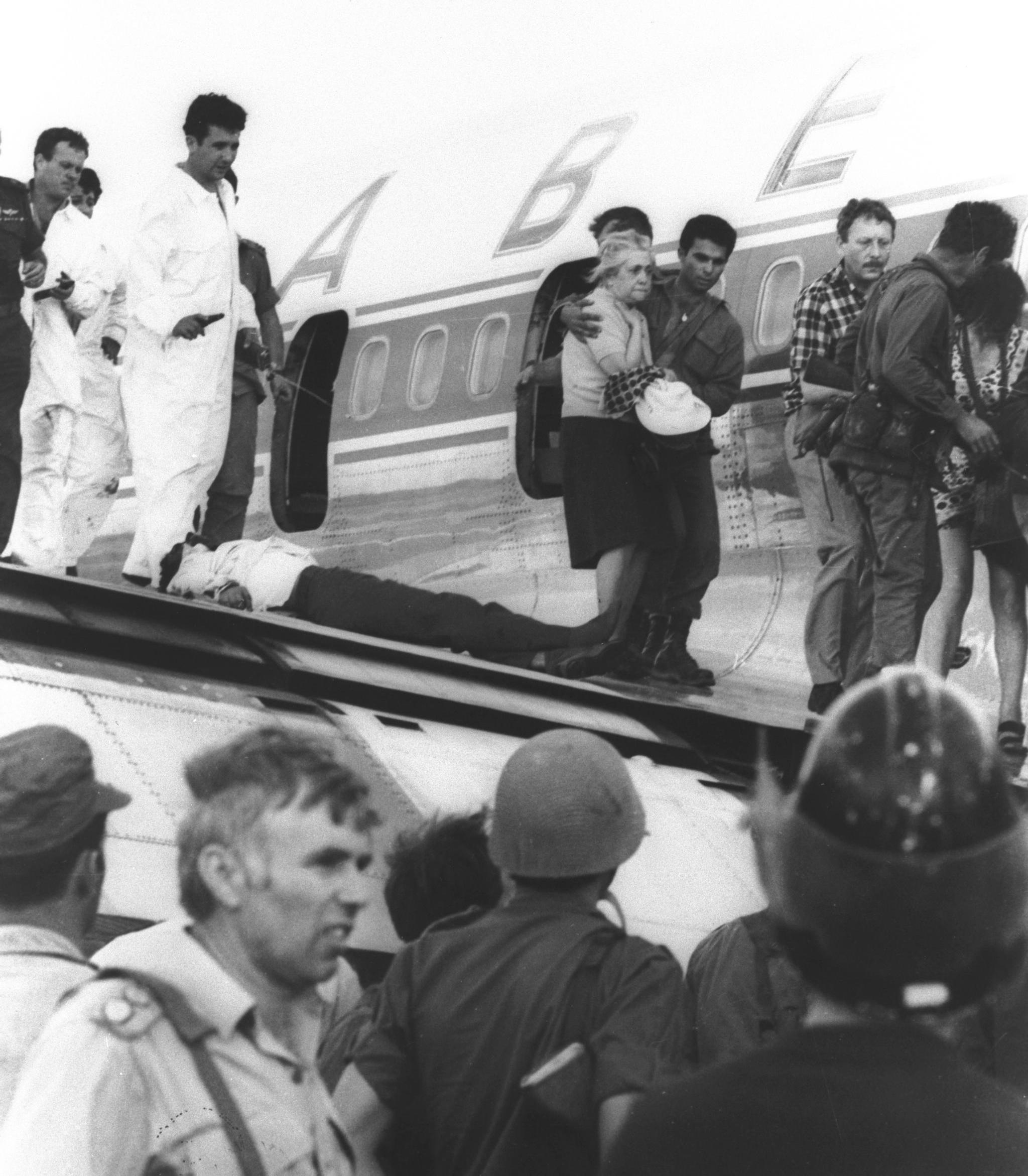
Rescued hostages of hijacked Sabena Flight 571 in Lod Airport, Israel (1972)

Aircraft hijackings involving Palestinian militant groups were a notable tactic used in the context of the Arab-Israeli conflict, particularly from the late 1960s to the early 1980s. While other hijackings in this time period were related to political defection or personal gains, the hijackings by Palestinian militant groups, were often high profile, violent and polically charged. Groups such as the Popular Front for the Liberation of Palestine (PFLP) and Black September carried out hijackings with the stated aims of demanding prisoner releases, drawing international attention to their cause, and pressuring governments. These attacks played a significant role in shaping global aviation security policies, leading to measures such as the introduction of metal detectors and the strengthening of counterterrorism responses by airlines and governments.

Several of these incidents had long-term geopolitical consequences, such as the Dawson's Field hijackings of 1970, which prompted international crackdowns on air piracy, and the Entebbe hijacking of 1976, which led to a military rescue operation by Israeli forces.

There were significant tensions among airline pilots and organizations like the International Federation of Air Line Pilots' Associations (IFALPA) during the late 1960s and early 1970s due to the rising number of hijackings. Pilots were deeply concerned about the lack of effective international responses to the growing threat of air piracy

In 1970, after a wave of high-profile hijackings, including the Dawson's Field hijackings carried out by the PFLP, airline pilots, represented by the IFALPA, threatened to strike. Their goal was to pressure governments and aviation authorities into implementing stronger security measures and more decisive responses to the growing threat of hijackings. Although the International Civil Aviation Organization (ICAO) did not organize or endorse the strike, it played a crucial role in the diplomatic efforts to combat air piracy. These efforts included the development of anti-hijacking conventions and the promotion of stricter airport security protocols.

The pilots' strike threats significantly heightened the sense of urgency among governments, contributing to the swift adoption of the Hague Convention of 1970, which established a stronger international legal framework for prosecuting hijackers and deterring future incidents.

This list includes confirmed aircraft hijackings and attacks attributed to Palestinian militant groups, based on credible historical and journalistic sources.

The criteria used for this list:

- Attempted and successful aircraft hijackings committed by Palestinian militant groups or individuals and persons with Palestinian sympathies.
- Successful sabotage or bombings of aircraft by Palestinian militant groups.
- Attempted and successful attacks on stationary aircraft on the ground by Palestinian militant groups or individuals.

== History ==
Aircraft hijackings related to Palestinians started in the 1960s and continued up to the 1990s. The hijackings can be grouped into the following decades, with a count of registered incidents.

Aircraft hijack incidents by Palestinean militant groups, 1968–1986
Year	1960	1970	1980	Total
Number	4	18	5	27

== 1960s ==
Date	Airline	Flight	Type	Route / Location	Perpetrator	Fatalities	Details and outcome
23 July 1968	El Al	Flight 426	Hijacking	Rome to Tel Aviv (diverted to Algiers)	PFLP	0	The only successful hijacking of an El Al commercial flight. Diverted to Algiers, where negotiations extended over 40 days before both the hijackers and the hostages were released.
26 December 1968	El Al	Flight 253	Ground attack	Athens International Airport, Greece	PFLP	1	Two Palestinian militants (including Mahmoud Mohammad Issa Mohammad) opened fire with submachine guns and threw hand grenades as the plane prepared for takeoff. One passenger was killed and two were injured. Both attackers were captured.
18 February 1969	El Al	Flight 432	Ground attack	Zurich Airport, Switzerland	PFLP	1	With AK-47 rifles and grenades, four militants attacked the Boeing 720 during a stopover in Zurich en route from Amsterdam to Tel Aviv. An onboard Israeli security guard shot and killed the leader of the attackers. One crew member was fatally wounded and several passengers were injured.
29 August 1969	TWA	Flight 840	Hijacking	Rome to Tel Aviv (diverted to Damascus)	PFLP	0	Two PFLP operatives (including Leila Khaled) commandeered the flight en route from Rome to Tel Aviv. Diverted to Damascus, the passengers were evacuated and the nose section of the aircraft was blown up. Two Israeli passengers were held for two months before being released in a prisoner exchange.

== 1970s ==
- (Switzerland) February 21, 1970: Swissair Flight 330 from Zurich-Kloten Airport to Kai Tak Airport, British Hong Kong, via Tel Aviv-Lod International Airport, crashed nine minutes after take-off when a bomb exploded. The attackers have never been conclusively identified, but have been alleged to have been members of the Popular Front for the Liberation of Palestine - General Command (PFLP-GC). All 38 passengers and 9 crew were killed. The same day another bomb exploded aboard an Austrian Airlines Caravelle bound for Vienna. The Austrian Airlines plane landed safely.
- (Egypt) July 22, 1970: Olympic Airways Flight 255 six PFLP hijacked a Boeing 727 out of Athens, Greece to Beirut, Lebanon. Greek authorities complied with the hijackers' demands and released seven Palestinian terrorists.
- (West Germany) (Switzerland) September 6, 1970: As part of the Dawson's Field hijackings by Popular Front for the Liberation of Palestine members, the TWA Flight 741 from Frankfurt (a Boeing 707) and Swissair Flight 100 from Zürich (a Douglas DC-8) were forced to land at Dawson's Field.
- (Israel) (Netherlands) (Palestine) September 6, 1970: As part of the Dawson's Field hijackings by PFLP members, the hijacking of El Al Flight 219 from Amsterdam (a Boeing 707) was foiled: hijacker Patrick Argüello was shot and killed, and his partner Leila Khaled was subdued and turned over to British authorities in London.
- (Palestine) September 6, 1970: As part of the Dawson's Field hijackings by PFLP members, two hijackers who were prevented from boarding the El Al flight, hijacked instead Pan Am Flight 93, a Boeing 747, diverting the large plane first to Beirut and then to Cairo, rather than to the small Jordanian airstrip.
- (Palestine) September 9, 1970: As part of the Dawson's Field hijackings by PFLP members, BOAC Flight 775, a Vickers VC10 coming from Bahrain, was hijacked by a PFLP sympathizer and brought to Dawson's Field in order to pressure the British to free Leila Khaled.
- (West Germany) (Japan) (South Yemen) February 22, 1972: Lufthansa Flight 649, a Boeing 747-200 from Tokyo to Frankfurt, was hijacked by a group commandeered by the Popular Front for the Liberation of Palestine (PFLP) during the Delhi-Athens leg and forced to divert to Aden, where all 182 passengers and crew were released the next day in exchange for a $5 million ransom.
- (Austria) May 8, 1972: Sabena Flight 571 from Vienna to Tel Aviv was taken over by four members of the Palestinian Black September movement. The plane diverted to Lod airport, where the hijackers demanded the release of Palestinian prisoners held by Israel, or the plane would be blown up. It was stormed by israeli Sayeret Matkal special forces. Two future Israeli prime ministers, Ehud Barak and Benjamin Netanyahu took part in the rescue. Two of the hijackers were killed along with one female passenger.
- (West Germany) (Lebanon) (Socialist Federal Republic of Yugoslavia) October 29, 1972: Lufthansa Flight 615, a Boeing 727, from Beirut to Frankfurt, piloted by Capt. Walter Claussen, was hijacked by three men and flown to Zagreb, asking for the liberation of the three surviving perpetrators of the Munich Massacre on 5 September that year. After boarding the three liberated men, the plane was redirected to Tripoli, Libya where all hostages were finally released.
- (Netherlands) (United Arab Emirates) (Syria) July 20, 1973: Japan Airlines Flight 404 was a Boeing 747-246B hijacked just after takeoff from Schiphol Airport en route to Tokyo. The hijackers were four Palestinians associated with Wadie Haddad, leader of the Popular Front for the Liberation of Palestine - External Operations (PFLP-GC) and a member of the Japanese Red Army. The plane flew to Dubai, then Damascus before ending in Libya. All passengers and crew were released after 89 hours, but the aircraft was destroyed on the ground in Benghazi, Libya.
- (France) On October 18, 1973, Danielle Cravenne, the second wife of French film producer Georges Cravenne, was shot dead by a police sniper at Marignane airport. Danielle, who was mentally unstable, had tried to hijack 1973 Paris-Nice flight to protest against the release of the film The Mad Adventures of Rabbi Jacob which was being promoted by Cravenne and which she considered "anti-Palestinian", especially in the midst of the Yom Kippur War.
- (Netherlands) (United Arab Emirates) November 25, 1973: A KLM Boeing 747, "Mississippi", was hijacked by three young Arabs over Iraqi airspace on a scheduled Amsterdam-Tokyo flight with 247 passengers on board. After the hijackers threatened to blow up the plane when no country would grant landing permission, the plane landed in Malta. Most of the passengers and the eight flight attendants were released after negotiations with the Maltese PM Dom Mintoff who argued with the hijackers that the plane could not possibly take off with both the passengers and the 27,000 gallons of fuel they had demanded given the (then) short runway. With 11 passengers on board the jumbo jet left Malta to Dubai where the incident ended without fatalities.
- (Italy) (Greece) December 17, 1973: 1973 Rome airport attacks and hijacking Five heavily armed Palestinian members of PLO invaded Rome-Fiumicino Airport and killed two people while making their way to Pan Am Flight 110 which was preparing to leave the gate. The destroyed the airplane and killed 30 passengers and crew. Then they hijacked Lufthansa Flight 303 and flew to Athens where one passenger was killed. They refueled and flew on to Damascus in Syria, where they again refueled. The final stop was Kuwait where all hostages was released, after the terrorists negotiated a free passage for themselves.
- (Israel) September 8, 1974: TWA Flight 841 (1974) from Tel Aviv-Lod International Airport to New York City via Athens and Rome, crashed into the Ionian Sea killing all 88 passengers and crew. The cause of the crash was a bomb in the cargo hold, believed to have been planted by the "National Arab Youth Organization for the Liberation of Palestine", a group associated with the Abu Nidal Organization.
- (Israel) June 27, 1976: The hijack of Air France Flight 139 on June 27, 1976, by members of the militant organizations Revolutionary Cells and the Popular Front for the Liberation of Palestine – External Operations was brought to an end on July 4 at Entebbe Airport, Uganda by Operation Entebbe. Israeli commandos assaulted the building holding the hijackers and hostages, killing all Palestinian hijackers and rescuing 105 persons, almost all Israeli and Jewish hostages. However, three passengers and one commando were killed.
- (Spain) (Palestine) October 13, 1977: Lufthansa Flight 181 (also known as the Landshut) was hijacked by Palestinian hijackers on a flight from Palma de Mallorca to Frankfurt. The ordeal ended in Mogadishu, Somalia when GSG 9 commandos stormed the plane. Three hijackers were killed and 86 hostages were freed. The pilot was killed before the raid. The hand of West Germany's Red Army Faction was suspected.

== 1980s ==
- (Japan) (United States) August 11, 1982: Pan Am Flight 830 was enroute to Los Angeles, California via Hawaii when a bomb planted on the aircraft exploded. The bomb had been planted by Mohammed Rashed, a Jordanian-born Palestinian linked to the 15 May Organization. One passenger was killed by the blast, but the pilot was able to land the plane safely at Honolulu International Airport.The bomber spent more than 20 years in prison, and was released in 2016.
- (United Arab Emirates) September 23, 1983: Gulf Air Flight 771 blew up in mid-flight after a bomb exploded in the baggage compartment. The plane was enroute from Karachi to Abu Dhabi. 112 passengers and crew died. The bomb was planted by the militant Palestinian Abu Nidal Organization in an attempt to pressure Saudi Arabia to pay protection money to avoid attacks on their own soil.
- (Palestine) (Egypt) November 23, 1985: Three Palestinian members of the Abu Nidal Organization hijacked its Athens to Cairo route, EgyptAir Flight 648 and demanded that it fly to Malta. All together, 60 people died, most of them when Egyptian commandos stormed the aircraft.
- (United States) (Greece) April 2, 1986: TWA Flight 840 bombing was a Boeing 727-231 from Los Angeles to Cairo, via New York City, Rome and Athens. A group called Izzeddin Qassam unit of the Arab Revolutionary Cells, linked to Palestinian Abu Nidal Organization, claimed responsibility for the bombing that exploded shortly before landing in Athens blasting a hole in the airplane's starboard side. Four passengers died after being blown out. The aircraft made a successful emergency landing.
- (Pakistan) (United States) September 5, 1986: 22 people were killed when Pakistani security forces stormed Pan Am Flight 73, a Boeing 747-121 carrying 360 passengers and crew, at Karachi after a 16-hour siege. The flight was en route to Frankfurt from Mumbai, India, when the flight was hijacked on the ground in Karachi by four armed terrorists of the Abu Nidal Organization. In 2023, the movie Hijacked: Flight 73, based on this hijacking, was released.
