= 1973 Athens Hellinikon International Airport attack =

Attack at Hellinikon International Airport Athens

Attack on the Hellinikon International Airport in Athens
- Location: 37.899°N 23.727°E; Athens, Greece
- Date: August 5, 1973
- Target: passengers at the Hellinikon International Airport
- Attack type: guns and grenades attack, hostage-taking
- Deaths: 5 (Note: 3 died on the day of the attack while 2 more died in the following weeks)
- Injuries: 55
- Perpetrators: Two Arab militants, members of the Black September

The 1973 Hellinikon International Airport attack was an attack at the Hellinikon International Airport at Athens, Greece. The two attackers were members of the Palestinian militant organization Black September. The militants used sub-machine guns and grenades against the passengers waiting in the passenger lounge. The attackers took hostages before they finally surrendered to the Greek police. It is believed that the gunmen wanted to hijack a plane, but they decided to attack when they were about to be searched by a Greek security inspector before boarding.

== Background ==
In December 1968, two Arabs made the El Al Flight 253 attack. The attackers had been arrested by the Greek authorities and said that their mission was to destroy an El Al's Boeing 707 plane and kill all the passengers.

In August 1969, there was the TWA Flight 840 hijacking.

In November 1969, two militants launched a grenade attack on the El Al offices at Athens destroying part of the offices, injuring 14 people and killing a two-year-old. They were arrested by the Greek authorities.

In December 1969 three other Arabs had been arrested by the Greek authorities before being able to hijack a TWA flight and they confessed that they were members of the Palestine Liberation Organization and arrived in Athens from Beirut for this mission.

In 1970, six Arabs from the Palestinian Popular Struggle Front hijacked an Olympic Airways's Boeing 727 (Flight 255) on its way from Beirut to Athens, demanding the release of the seven Arab guerrillas held in Greek jail. After an International Red Cross plea for the lives of the hostages, the Greek authorities promised to release the seven Arabs in one month's time. After refueled, the hijackers released the passengers but held hostage the crew and a Red Cross representative and flew to Cairo.

In 1972 and 1973, Black September had done terrorist attack in different countries, including the Munich massacre at the 1972 Summer Olympics, the Israeli Bangkok Embassy hostage crisis, the Sabena Flight 571, the Attack on the Saudi embassy in Khartoum and the 1973 New York City bomb plot.

In addition, in July 1973, an armed Palestinian with sub-machine gun, grenades and revolvers tried unsuccessfully to attack the Athens office of the El Al Israel Airlines. After his unsuccessful attack, he held 17 people hostages (including children) in a hotel nearby, threatening to kill them all including himself, and demanded a safe passage to the Middle East. He was deported to Kuwait.

== Attack ==
The two attackers, according to the Greek prosecutor, were: Shafik el Arid (22 years old) and Tallal Khantouran (21 or 22 years old), both from Jordan. They arrived in Athens the same day (5 August) from Beirut, Lebanon in order to make the attack. They had traveled to Athens previously on 3 August from Benghazi, Libya to survey the transit lounge. Their orders were to attack Israel-bound passengers of any nationality travelling by any airline.

The attackers opened fire and threw grenades into the crowd, killing three, injuring 55 (including five police officers), and destroying parts of the building. They then took 35 hostages and held them for more than two hours before surrendering to the police. Those killed were Jeannie Salandi, Elbert Kersen and Wolfgang Ullhofen. Salandi and Kersen were Americans while Ullhofen was Austrian. On August 16, another American, Laura Haack, died from injuries sustained in the attack. On September 18, the fifth and final victim, Henry Leppo, also an American, died from his injuries.

Their target was a flight for Tel Aviv, but they made a mistake and attacked the passengers for a flight to New York.

The Tel Aviv Airport security was tightened due to fear that a plane flying to Israel might be hijacked. It was relaxed when the terrorists were arrested by the Greek authorities and it was clear that the attack was over.

== Aftermath ==
The Greek Government protested to Arab ambassadors and asked them "to cooperate in order to avert such actions in the future."

=== Lufthansa plane hijacking ===
In December, the capture of the killers from the Hellinikon airport attack led to the 1973 Rome airport attacks and hijacking. The hijackers demanded from the Greek government the release of the two terrorists. After failing to persuade the Greek authorities to release the terrorists, they limited their demands to permission for just refuelling and leaving.

=== Court decision ===
The Greek courts charged the killers with "premeditated homicide of a particularly odious nature, three counts; attempted homicide and grievous bodily injuries, 55 counts; considerable damage to foreign property and public utilities; illegal detention of persons; obstructing aerial communications and creating disorder in an airport, and illegal possession and use of weapons" and in January 1974 they were sentenced to death.

=== Hostage Crisis in Pakistan ===
In February 1974, three guerrillas armed with pistols, grenades and plastic bombs hijacked the Greek freighter Vori, holding Greeks as hostages at Karachi, Pakistan, and demanded the release of the attackers. They threatened to blow up the ship and kill the hostages, declaring that they were members of the Muslim International Guerrillas, a group which was active in the Philippines and Indonesia. Greek government asked Arab ambassadors to intervene. The Palestine Liberation Organization officials from the Karachi office and the ambassadors to Pakistan of Syria, Egypt and Lebanon went to meet the guerrillas in order to help with the negotiations.

The guerrillas eventually released the hostages, and in return the Greek government commuted the sentence of the Athens attackers from death to life imprisonment. One of the hostages said that the gunmen were under the impression that the terrorists in Athens would be released.

After they released the hostages, the guerrillas, accompanied by the Libyan and Egyptian ambassadors, boarded a Pakistan International Airlines Boeing 707 and travelled to Egypt, whence they took another flight to Libya. The guerrillas were wearing masks and dark glasses in order to hide their faces.

=== Deportation to Libya ===
In May 1974, the Greek government decided to deport the two terrorists to Libya. Israel protested saying that their release would encourage terrorism.
