= Willi Voss =

German screenwriter and journalist (born 1944)

Personal details
- Born: Willi Pohl; 9 May 1944 (age 82) Ruhr region, Germany
- Other political affiliations: PLO (former)
- Occupation: Writer, laborer, librarian, journalist

Willi Voss (born on 9 May 1944 as Willi Pohl) and sometimes writing under the pseudonym E. W. Pless, is a German laborer, librarian, and journalist. In the 1970s he was known as a far right ideologue and neo-Nazi and an arms procurer for the Palestinian Liberation Organization, and was involved in the 1972 Summer Olympics Munich Massacre.

== Biography ==
Willi Pohl grew up in the Ruhr region. In the 1970s, he was a member of the German neo-Nazi scene, with ties to the criminal milieu. The contact had been established by the neo-Nazi Udo Albrecht, with whom Pohl was friends for several years. As a PLO affiliate, he smuggled weapons for Palestinian commandos in Germany. Pohl helped Abu Daoud and the Black September Organization, and the mastermind of the 1972 Munich attacks in its planning and execution, according to his own account unknowingly. After the Munich assassinations, he planned to take hostages in Vienna's St. Stephen's Cathedral and in parallel in Cologne Cathedral on Christmas 1972 in order to ransom the three surviving Munich preparators. Since the preparatory smuggling of weapons was exposed by an informant, he was arrested by the Bavarian police at the end of October 1972 with weapons and a threatening letter from Black September. Three days after his arrest came the hijacking of Lufthansa Flight 615, which was used to ransom the Black September members. Pohl's hopes of also being ransomed were not fulfilled.

According to the Frankfurter Allgemeine, Pohl was sentenced in 1974 to a prison term of two years and two months only for unlawful possession of weapons. Four days after the judge's verdict, he was let go and departed for Beirut."

In December 2012, Der Spiegel reported that Pohl, according to his own statements, had spied on the headquarters of the PLO secret service Rasd as an agent for the CIA since 1975, after defecting from Black September. Under the alias Ganymede, he is said to have provided information and documents on plans for attacks in the Middle East and Europe, identified terrorist cells, and reported the collaboration between the neo-Nazi Udo Albrecht and his accomplices with Palestinians.

He returned to Germany from the Middle East in the late 1970s, after being captured by Christian militias in Lebanon and released in a prisoner exchange. He had received a remission from the authorities in return for his information. Back in Germany, he wrote as a freelance writer, mostly under his current name Willi Voss, but sometimes also under the pseudonym E.W. Pless. He wrote Western stories and Jerry Cotton novels, in addition to a number of crime novels and political thrillers, which were published by Bastei-Lübbe and Ullstein Verlag, among others. He has also written screenplays for episodes of the shows Großstadtrevier and Tatort.

He received an award for his novel Gegner in the Konsalik Novel Prize competition. With the book Das Gesetz des Dschungels (The Law of the Jungle), he won third place in the national competition for the German Crime Fiction Award in 1989.

== Bibliography ==
=== As E. W. Pless ===
- Geblendet. Aus den authentischen Papieren eines Terroristen. Schweizer Verlagshaus, Zürich 1979, ISBN 3-7263-6217-7.
- Gegner. Schweizer Verlagshaus, Zürich 1983. ISBN 3-7263-6377-7
- Signum F. Rehkugler u. Voss, Reutlingen 1986. ISBN 3-926062-00-2

=== As Willi Voss ===
- Tränen schützen nicht vor Mord. Bastei Lübbe, Bergisch Gladbach 1982. ISBN 3-404-36059-1
- Frost im Blut. Bastei Lübbe, Bergisch Gladbach 1984. ISBN 3-404-37016-3
- Der stirbt von selbst. Bastei Lübbe, Bergisch Gladbach 1984. ISBN 3-404-37022-8
- Keine Tränen für das Opfer. Bastei Lübbe, Bergisch Gladbach 1985. ISBN 3-404-37033-3
- Auch Narren sterben einsam. Bastei Lübbe, Bergisch Gladbach 1986. ISBN 3-404-10778-0
- Das Gesetz des Dschungels. Ullstein, Frankfurt/M. 1988. ISBN 3-548-10565-3
- Die Nacht, der Tod. Ullstein, Frankfurt/M. 1990. ISBN 3-548-10658-7
- Pforte des Todes. Pendragon, Bielefeld 2009. ISBN 978-3-86532-154-1
- Bitteres Blut. Sutton, Erfurt 2011. ISBN 978-3-86680-958-1
- UnterGrund aavaa, Berlin 2012. ISBN 978-3-944223-00-1
