= Flight 255 =

Flight 255 may refer to:

Listed chronologically

- Olympic Airways Flight 255, hijacked 1970
- Quebecair Flight 255, crashed 1979, engine failure
- Northwest Airlines Flight 255, crashed 1987, pilot error
