= Khalid Duhham Al-Jawary =

Convicted terrorist (born 1945)

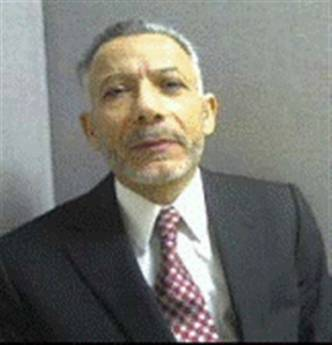
Khalid Al-Jawary (photo by US Immigration and Customs Enforcement)

Khalid Duhham Al-Jawary (born 1945), also known as Abu Walid al-Iraqi and Khaled Mohammed El-Jassem, is a convicted terrorist. A Jordanian and Iraqi citizen of Palestinian origin, he served 16 years for plotting to attack New York City in 1973, placing three self-manufactured bombs in cars which failed to detonate.

== Black September ==
Al-Jawary has been tied to a letter-bombing campaign conducted by the Black September militant group that targeted world leaders during the 1970s and a failed attack in 1979. He has also been accused of involvement in the bombing of TWA Flight 841 in 1974.

== New York City bomb plot ==
In 1973, Al-Jawary manufactured powerful explosives and left them in three rental cars near Israeli targets throughout New York City. He targeted two Israeli banks on Fifth Avenue and the El-Al cargo terminal at John F. Kennedy International Airport. The explosions were intended to occur on March 4 to coincide with a visit by Israeli Prime Minister Golda Meir. The bombs failed to detonate, but the construction and materials used allowed the FBI to link the explosives to the Black September letter-bombs and to Al-Jawary. Investigators matched 60 fingerprints from evidence with Al-Jawary's.

== 1980 assassination attempt ==
On October 25, 1980, an unidentified assailant launched a rocket at the automobile of Abu Walid al-Iraqi while in Beirut, Lebanon. Although two aides suffered injuries, Abu Walid escaped the attack unharmed. The Voice of Palestine, a PLO-supported radio station, blamed the attack on the Mossad, although a rival Palestinian militant group may have attempted the attack. The same radio report indicated that he was head of the technical division of the Unified Security Organization, where he worked closely with Salah Khalaf, or Abu Iyad, for many years.

== Capture and release ==
In January 1991 he flew from Iraq to attend the funeral of Abu Iyad in Tunis. He was detained en route in Rome for use of a false Jordanian passport. A few months later Italian authorities handed over custody to the FBI, who flew Al-Jawary to stand trial in Brooklyn. In 1993, he was sentenced to 30 years in prison.

In 2000, Al-Jawary claimed in a sworn statement to U.S. immigration officials that he was a member of the PLO and of Hamas.

Al-Jawary was released from the federal Supermax prison in Florence, Colorado on February 19, 2009, having served 16 years of his term, and was handed over to US immigration officials pending deportation. On February 26, Al-Jawary was escorted from the United States, arriving in Sudan on March 3 after having been denied asylum in Jordan and Algeria.
