= Killing of Ami Shachori =

Killing of Israeli attaché, London, 1972

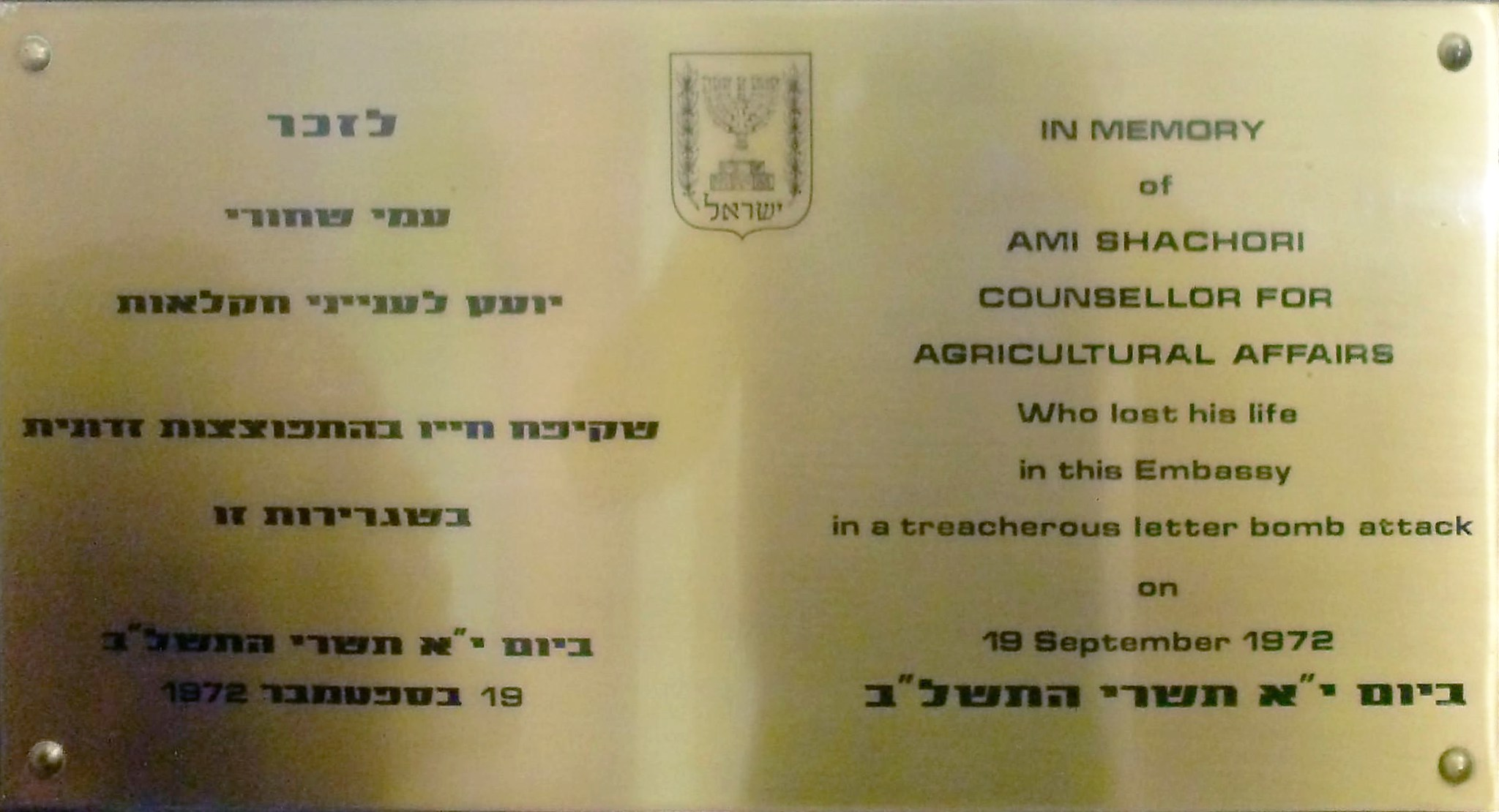
Commemorative plaque at the Israeli embassy in London

On 18 September 1972, a letter bomb mailed from Amsterdam to the Israeli embassy in London killed Dr. Ami Y. Shachori, the Israeli agriculture attaché at the Israeli embassies in the United Kingdom and Scandinavia. Theodor Kaddar, Shachori's designated replacement, was injured in the blast. Shachori had been in London since 1968. His role at the embassy was to promote Israeli agricultural products. He was a soil expert and a graduate of the University of California and the Hebrew University in Jerusalem.

== Letter bomb campaign ==
In September 1972 before the attack, the Palestine Liberation Organization's official Radio Elghiza gave a 10-day warning of the letter bomb campaign. Letter bombs were sent to Israeli diplomatic missions in the Americas and Europe.

Eight total letter bombs addressed to the Israeli embassy were discovered. After the attack, security officials subsequently discovered three additional mail bombs addressed to senior Israeli officials at the embassy. Four additional letter bombs were found at a Royal Mail sorting office.

Israeli Ambassador Michael Comay blamed Palestinian militant group Black September Organization, which had conducted the Munich massacre two weeks prior. One of the letters contained a leaflet from the group.

Joint memorial services for Shachori and for the 11 victims of the Munich massacre were held at the Israeli embassy and the Marble Arch Synagogue, attended by Comay and Chief Rabbi Immanuel Jakobovits.

== Response ==
Alec Douglas-Home, the British Foreign Secretary, said in response that "Britain was disgusted at the underhand act of terrorism".
