= TWA Flight 841 (1974) =

1974 airliner bombing

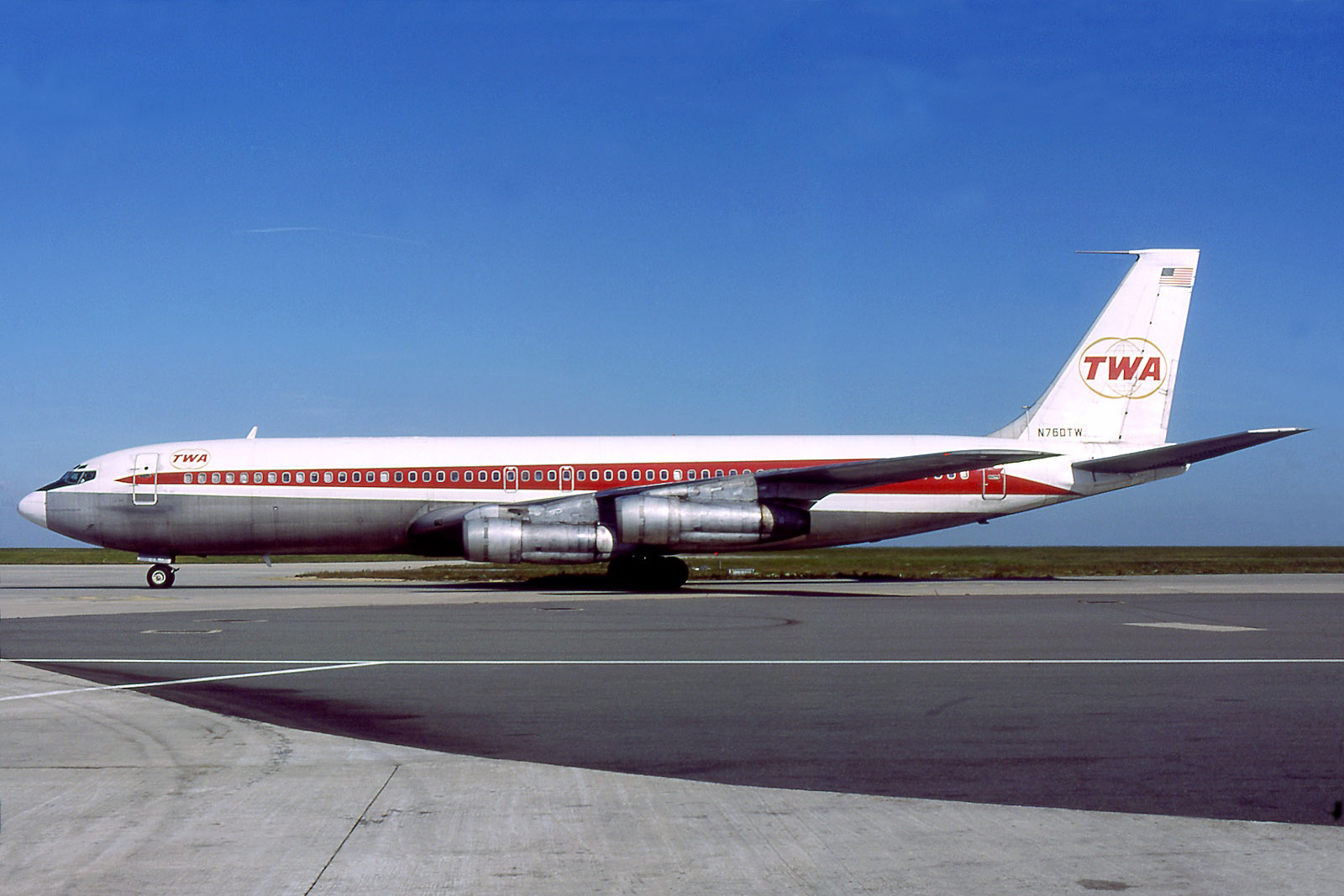
- A TWA Boeing 707-331B similar to N8734

Bombing
- Date: September 8, 1974
- Summary: Terrorist bombing causing structural and control system failures followed by stall
- Site: Over the West Coast of Greece (Ionian Sea); 38°25′N 19°22′E

Aircraft
- Aircraft type: Boeing 707-331B
- Operator: Trans World Airlines
- Call sign: TWA 841
- Registration: N8734
- Flight origin: Ben Gurion International Airport, Tel Aviv, Israel
- 1st stopover: Ellinikon International Airport, Athens, Greece
- Last stopover: Leonardo Da Vinci International Airport, Rome, Italy
- Destination: John F. Kennedy International Airport, New York City, United States
- Occupants: 88
- Passengers: 79
- Crew: 9
- Fatalities: 88
- Survivors: 0

On September 8, 1974, a Boeing 707 (registered N8734) operating as TWA Flight 841 from Tel Aviv to New York City via Athens and Rome crashed into the Ionian Sea, killing all aboard. The National Transportation Safety Board determined that the plane had been destroyed by a bomb hidden in the cargo hold. The detonation of the bomb destroyed the systems responsible for operating the plane's control surfaces, causing the plane to pitch up until it stalled and dove into the sea.

== Background ==
After the ousting of the PLO from Jordan following the Jordanian–Palestinian civil war, the Palestinian military organizations made South Lebanon into their headquarters, enlisting militants from Palestinian refugee camps. South Lebanon was also referred to as Fatahland, due to the almost complete control of Fatah and other military Palestinian organizations over this officially Lebanese area, which they used to stage attacks against Israel.

== Aircraft and crew ==
Boeing 707-331B N8734 had its maiden flight in March 1969, and was purchased by Irving Trust Corporation before it was leased to TWA on April 7, 1969. It was powered by four Pratt & Whitney JT3D-3B turbofan engines.

The captain was Donald H. Holliday, 55, who had 21,960 flight hours, including 7,280 hours on the Boeing 707. Due to farsightedness, he had to wear prescription glasses. Holliday's first officer was Jon L. Cheshire, 36, who had 9,139 flight hours, with 5,311 of them on the Boeing 707. The flight engineer was Ralph H. Bosh, 37, who had 6,634 flight hours, with 3,548 of them on the Boeing 707.

There were six flight attendants on board the flight.

== Events ==
The airline's Tel Aviv office said 49 passengers boarded the plane there for Rome and the United States. They included 17 Americans (plus a baby), 13 Japanese, four Italians, four French, three Indians, two Iranians, two Israelis, two Sri Lankans, an Australian and a Canadian. The nationalities of 30 other passengers and the nine crew members were not immediately known at the time. Reuters reported a total of 37 Americans aboard. The crash occurred about 50 nautical miles west of Cephalonia, Greece.

After stopping for 68 minutes in Athens, it departed for Rome. About 30 minutes after takeoff, the plane crashed into the Ionian Sea. The out-of-control aircraft was observed by crew on the flight deck of Pan Am Flight 110. They watched the aircraft execute a steep climb, followed by the separation of an engine from the wing and a death spiral. All 79 passengers and nine crew members were killed.

In Beirut, it was reported that a Palestinian youth organization claimed it had put a guerrilla on the plane with a bomb. However, a spokesman for TWA said sabotage was "highly unlikely." Later, the National Transportation Safety Board determined that the plane was indeed destroyed by a bomb hidden in the cargo hold, which caused structural failure resulting in uncontrollable flight. The USS Independence along with the USS Biddle was tasked with picking up the debris and bodies. The wreck of the plane rests in 3,164 m (10,381 ft) of water, and it was decided that whatever additional information the wreckage contained (like the recorders on board) would not justify the cost and difficulty of recovering the main wreckage.

Suspicion fell on Abu Nidal and his terror organization, as responsibility was claimed by the "National Arab Youth Organization for the Liberation of Palestine", a group led by Abu Nidal from Libya.

In January 2009 the Associated Press published an investigation saying that Khalid Duhham Al-Jawary, responsible for the 1973 New York City bomb plot, was linked to the bombing of TWA Flight 841.

== Maps ==
Location of the crash and the airports

== Notes ==
- Barry Werth, 31 Days: Gerald Ford, The Nixon Pardon and a Government in Crisis (New York: Anchor Books). 2006. pp. 324–5 ISBN 978-1-4000-7868-4
