= Abu Daoud =

Palestinian militant, teacher and lawyer (1937–2010)

- A portrait of Abu Daoud from before 2010
- Born: Mohammad Daoud Oudeh; 1937; Silwan, Mandatory Palestine
- Died: 3 July 2010 (aged 72–73); Damascus, Syria
- Years active: 1960s–2000s

Mohammad Daoud Oudeh (Arabic: محمد داود عودة; 1937 – 3 July 2010), commonly known by his nom de guerre Abu Daoud or Abu Dawud (أبو داود), was a Palestinian militant, teacher and lawyer known as the planner, architect and mastermind of the Munich massacre. He served in a number of commanding functions in Fatah's armed units in Lebanon and Jordan.

== Biography ==
Oudeh was born in Silwan, East Jerusalem, in 1937. He was a teacher by training. He taught physics and mathematics in Jordan and Saudi Arabia. Then he worked at the justice ministry of Kuwait and studied law. He lived in Jerusalem until the 1967 Six-Day War, when he was displaced after Israel captured the eastern portion of the city. He resettled in Jordan, where he joined the PLO.

In 1970, Abu Daoud was one of the founders of Fatah. He received military training from the North Korean military. From 1971 he was leader of the Black September, a Fatah offshoot created to avenge the September 1970 expulsion of the Fedayeen Movement from Jordan and carry out international operations. The group gained international notoriety for its role in the Munich massacre at the 1972 Munich Olympics, in which a number of athletes on the Israeli team were taken hostage by Black September. Eleven Israeli athletes and a German policeman were killed by the end of the multi-day stand-off. Documents uncovered in 2012 show that logistical help and support were supplied by two German neo-Nazis, Wolfgang Abramowski and Willi Pohl. The connection was made through Udo Albrecht, a neo-Nazi who set up a right-wing German group (Volksbefreiungs-Front Deutschland) and provided assistance to the Palestinians in return for training facilities in Jordan.

After the Black September attack, Oudeh lived in Eastern Europe and Lebanon. He resumed his activities with Fatah and the PLO in close collaboration with Abu Iyad and other officials. He led armed units in Lebanon during the Lebanese Civil War. In January 1977, Oudeh was intercepted by French police in Paris while travelling from Beirut under an assumed name, and was arrested despite protests from the PLO, Iraq and Libya, who claimed that because Oudeh was travelling to a PLO comrade's funeral he should receive diplomatic immunity. The French government refused a West German extradition request on the grounds that forms had not been filled in properly and put him on a plane to Algeria before Germany could submit another request. Oudeh fled to Eastern Europe, then to Lebanon until the 1975 Lebanese Civil War broke out, then back to Jordan.

On 1 August 1981, Oudeh was shot five times from a distance of around two meters (6') in the coffee shop of the Victoria Inter-Continental Hotel in Warsaw, but he survived the attack, chasing his would-be assassin down to the front entrance of the hotel before collapsing. Oudeh claimed the attempted assassination was carried out by a Palestinian double agent recruited by the Mossad, and claimed the would-be assassin was executed by the PLO ten years later.

After the 1993 Oslo Accords, he moved to Ramallah in the West Bank. Following a trip to Jordan and the publication of his memoirs, Oudeh was banned from returning to Ramallah. He settled with his family in Syria, the only country that would take him. He lived on a pension provided by the Palestinian Authority and gave interviews to Aljazeera and other Arab and international media outlets about his life, the Munich events, and Palestinian politics. Oudeh was allowed safe passage through Israel in 1996, so he could attend a PLO meeting in the Gaza Strip to rescind an article in the PLO charter calling for Israel's eradication.

== Munich massacre ==
As a commander of Black September, Abu Daoud was the mastermind behind the Munich massacre. He planned the operation in July 1972, briefed the killers on the specifics of the operation, and accompanied the members of the cell to the Olympic Village by taxi on the night/early morning of the attack. It was on the evening of 4 September 1972, the day before the operation commenced in the early morning of 5 September 1972, that Abu Daoud briefed the squad and issued final instructions over dinner in a restaurant at the Munich railway station.

In 2006, Abu Daoud gave several personal interviews after the release of the Steven Spielberg film Munich revived discussions of the massacre. Abu Daoud remained unrepentant regarding his role in the Munich attacks, stating on Germany's Spiegel TV, "I regret nothing. You can only dream that I would apologise." In an Associated Press interview, he justified the operation by claiming it was a strategic success, declaring: "Before Munich, we were simply terrorists. After Munich, at least people started asking who are these terrorists? What do they want? Before Munich, nobody had the slightest idea about Palestine."

== Published works ==
He published his autobiography Palestine: From Jerusalem to Munich in French in 1999. It was later published in English as Memoirs of a Palestinian Terrorist, also titled Palestine-A History of the Resistance Movement, by the Sole Survivor of Black September by Arcade Publishing in hard-cover format. The book is a first hand account of the rise of the Palestinian resistance movement from its inception to the attack at the 1972 Munich Olympics. Regarding the book and his subsequently being barred from returning to the West Bank, "The Israeli decision to bar my return is linked to an event which happened 27 years ago, the Munich operation, which we considered a legitimate struggle against the enemy we (the PLO) were fighting."

In 1999, the Palestinian Prize for Culture was granted to Abu Daoud for his book Palestine: From Jerusalem to Munich, in which he describes how he planned and executed the Munich operation. As part of the prize, Abu Daoud was awarded 10,000 French francs.

== Death ==
On 3 July 2010, Daoud died of kidney failure at Al-Andalus Hospital in Damascus, Syria. After a funeral service in the Al Wasim Mosque in Yarmouk with his coffin draped in the Palestinian flag, he was buried in the Martyrs Cemetery of the Yarmouk Palestinian refugee camp on the southern outskirts of Damascus. He was survived by his wife, five daughters and a son. His daughter Hana Oudeh, in the eulogy, said her father was "a great loving and sincere man whose dream was to go back to Palestine." Representatives of various Palestinian groups, including Fatah and Islamic Jihad, attended the funeral. Shortly before his death, Oudeh said in a statement to Israelis, "Today, I cannot fight you any more, but my grandson will and his grandsons too."

In a condolence letter to Abu Daoud's family following his death, the chairman of the Palestinian Authority, Mahmoud Abbas, wrote: "He is missed. He was one of the leading figures of Fatah and spent his life in resistance and sincere work as well as physical sacrifice for his people's just causes."
