= 1969 Athens airline office attack =

1969 terrorist attack

1969 Athens attack
- Location: Athens, Greece
- Date: 27 November 1969
- Attack type: Grenade attacks
- Deaths: 1
- Injuries: 14
- Perpetrator: Palestinian Popular Struggle Front

On 27 November 1969, El Al offices in Athens, Greece were attacked with grenades by two terrorists belonging to the Palestinian Popular Struggle Front (PSF). A 2-year-old Greek boy later died from his injuries, while 14 others were wounded in the attack. The two terrorists were arrested but subsequently released in the wake of the Olympic Airways Flight 255 hijacking.

In 2019, Mansour Saif al-Din Mourad, a member of Jordan’s House of Representatives, in a television interview bragged about carrying out a terrorist attack against El Al offices in Greece in 1969 which was thought to have been this attack, although the date was cited as 27 December.
