= Michael Comay =

Israeli diplomat (1908–1987)

- מיכאל שאול קומיי
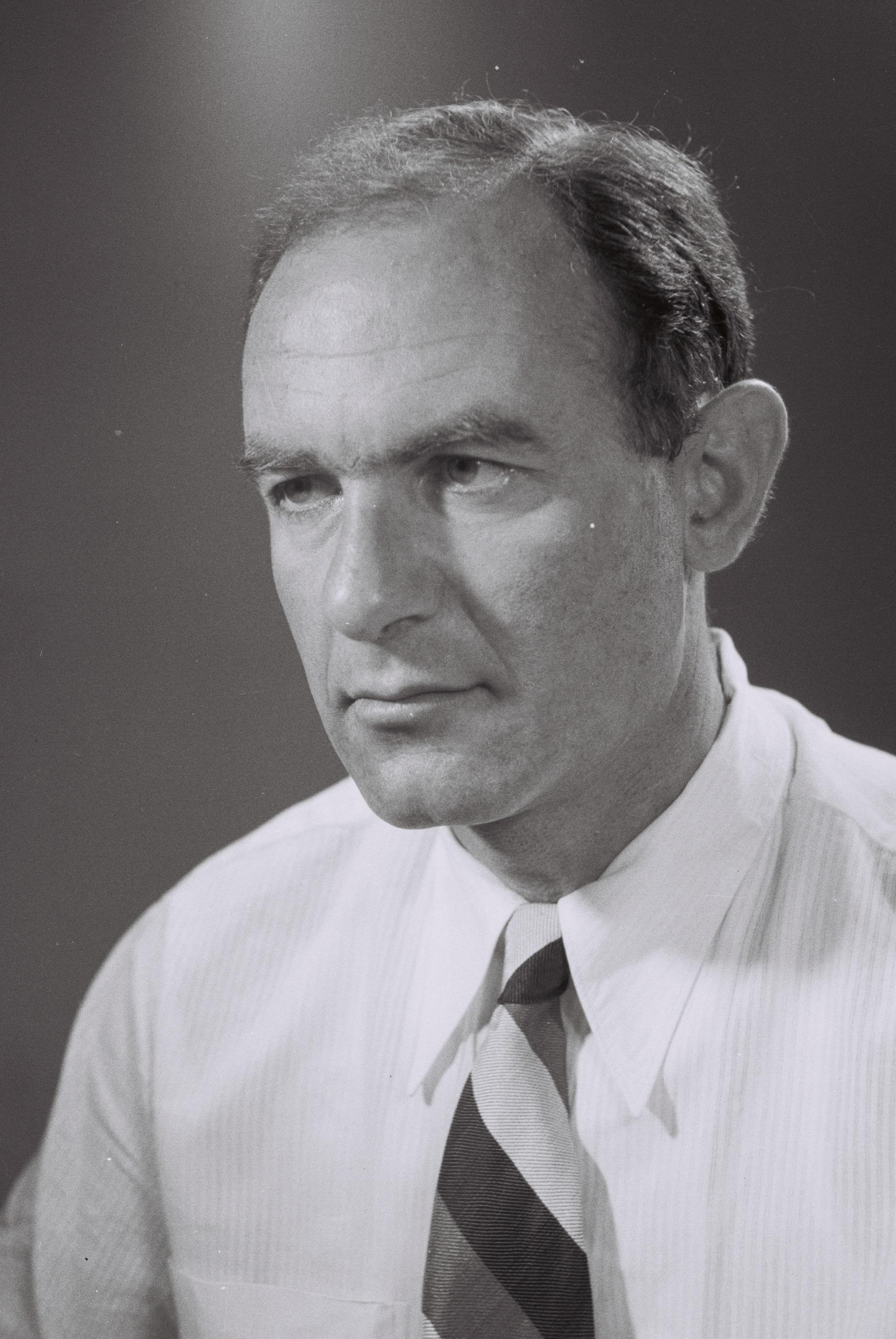
- Michael Comay, c.1958

Diplomatic roles
- 1954–1957: Ambassador of Israel to Canada
- 1959-1967: Permanent Representative to the UN
- 1970-1973: Ambassador of Israel to the United Kingdom

2nd Permanent Representative to the UN
- In office 1959–1967
- Prime Minister: David Ben-Gurion, Levi Eshkol
- Preceded by: Abba Eban
- Succeeded by: Gideon Rafael

Personal details
- Born: 17 October 1908 Cape Town, South Africa
- Died: 6 November 1987 (aged 79) Jerusalem

Michael Saul Comay (Hebrew: מיכאל שאול קומיי; October 17, 1908 – November 6, 1987) was an Israeli diplomat. He was the Israeli Ambassador to Canada from 1953 to 1957, Permanent Representative of Israel to the United Nations from 1960 to 1967, and was Ambassador to the United Kingdom from 1970 to 1973.

== Early life ==
Comay was born on 1908 in Cape Town, South Africa. He studied general sciences and law at the University of Cape Town, and was qualified to practice law at a higher level. From 1931, he worked as a lawyer and began to work with the South African Jewish community.

During World War II, Comey served in the infantry of the South African Army and fought in the North African campaign, and attained the rank of major. After the end of the war, Comay gave up his work as a lawyer in Cape Town and emigrated to the Mandatory Palestine with his family, and worked for the Jewish Agency.

== Diplomatic career ==
Initially, he worked as a representative of the South African Zionist Federation under the auspices of the Jewish Agency. Subsequently, he became more active in the political department of the Jewish Agency and in 1947, he was sent to the United Nations to advocate for support for the establishment of the Jewish state.

After the establishment of the state of Israel in 1948, Comey joined the Ministry of Foreign Affairs and served as the director of the Commonwealth division within the ministry. In 1952, he was appointed deputy director-general of the foreign ministry and a year later, he served as Israel's Consul General in Canada. In 1954, prior to becoming an ambassador to Canada, he sought the acquisition of 24 Canadair Sabres for the Israeli Air Force but failed due to the outbreak of the 1956 Suez War.

After serving as ambassador to Canada till 1957, Comey served as Israel's permanent representative to the United Nations from 1959 to 1967. From 1970 to 1973, he served as Israel's ambassador to the United Kingdom. Comay retired from foreign service in 1979.

== Personal life ==
Comay and his wife had two sons and one daughter. One of his sons, Yohanan, was killed in action during the 1973 Yom Kippur War while serving as a soldier in the Artillery Corps of the Israel Defense Forces.

Following his retirement from foreign service, Comay and his wife were leaders of the Israeli Society for the Prevention of Cruelty to Animals. In 1981, he published his book Zionism, Israel and the Palestinian Arabs: Questions and Answers. He died in 1987 at the age of 79.
