= El Al Flight 253 =

1968 terrorist attack on a Boeing 707

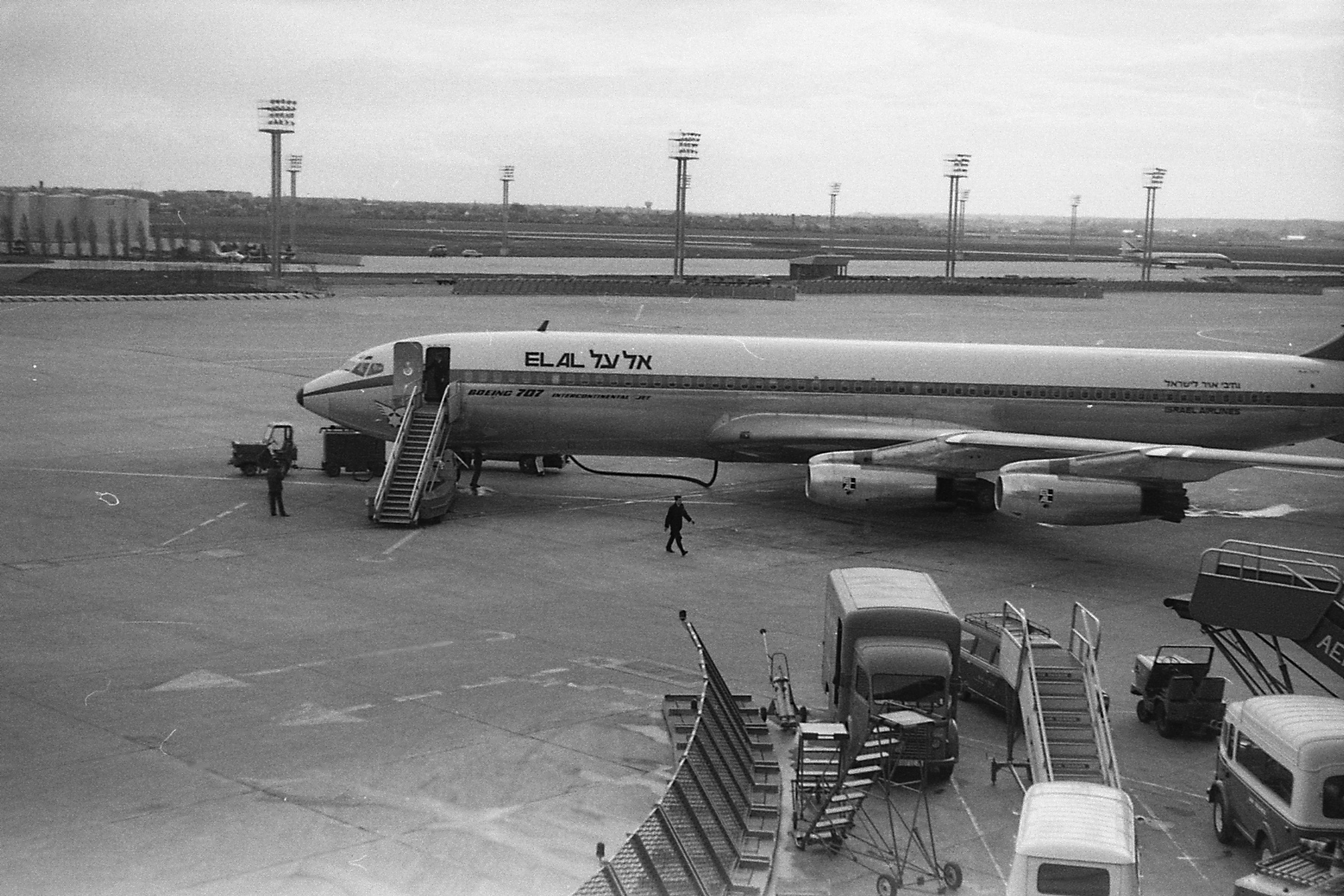
- A similar Boeing 707

Terrorist Incident
- Date: December 26, 1968
- Summary: Terrorist attack
- Site: Ellinikon International Airport, Athens, Greece

Aircraft
- Aircraft type: Boeing 707
- Operator: El Al
- Flight origin: Tel Aviv, Israel
- Stopover: Ellinikon International Airport, Athens, Greece
- Destination: New York City, United States
- Passengers: 41
- Crew: 10
- Fatalities: 1
- Injuries: 2
- Survivors: 50

The El Al Flight 253 attack was a terrorist attack against a Boeing 707 passenger plane by the Popular Front for the Liberation of Palestine (PFLP). The attack took place while the plane was on a layover in Athens en route from Tel Aviv, Israel, to New York City, United States in 1968.

== Background ==
Days before the attack, European and American authorities warned European airlines about bomb threats during the pre-Christmas holiday rush.

The incident came five months after a group of self-styled Palestinian Arab commandos hijacked El Al Flight 426 on July 23, shortly after it took-off from Rome for Tel Aviv and forced it to fly to Algiers. Algeria eventually released all passengers, crew and the plane.

== Attack ==
The two attackers were 19-year-old Naheb H. Suleiman, born in Tripoli, Libya, of Palestinian parents, and 25-year-old Mahmoud Mohammad Issa Mohammad, born in 1943 in Mandatory Palestine. They were members of the PFLP. They arrived on an earlier Olympic Airways flight from Cairo. 37 of the 41 passengers boarded the flight in Tel Aviv, and four boarded in Athens.

Mohammad and Suleiman attacked Flight 253 as it was about to depart from a layover in Athens, Greece on December 26, 1968. The two dashed out of the airport transit lounge just as the Israeli plane, parked 200 yards (180 m) away, was preparing to take off. The plane had flown in earlier from Tel Aviv. Mohammad fired at the plane for more than a minute with a submachine gun while Suleiman threw two hand grenades, creating panic among the planes' 10 crew and 41 passengers. One passenger, Israeli Leon Shirdan, 50, of Haifa, a marine engineer, was killed. He was survived by his wife and then 15-year-old daughter. Two unidentified women were injured, one by a bullet, the other as she leaped from the jet when the door was opened.

== Aftermath ==
=== Perpetrators ===
Mohammad and Suleiman were taken into custody by Greek authorities. Both confessed they were members of a Palestinian organization and had planned to destroy the jet and kill all Israeli passengers aboard. Mohammad was sentenced to 17 years and 5 months in prison, but was freed some 4 months later after another Palestinian terrorist group hijacked a Greek airliner and demanded his release in the Olympic Airways Flight 255 hijacking. Subsequently, he successfully hid his terrorist past and emigrated to Canada. Once Canadian authorities learned of his crime, a protracted extradition process culminated in his extradition to Lebanon in 2013.

=== Retributory raid ===
Two days after the attack, Israel raided the Beirut International Airport, destroying 12 (or possibly 13) Lebanese passenger airplanes. The attack drew a sharp rebuke from the US, which stated that nothing suggested that the Lebanese authorities had anything to do with the El Al attack.
