= Embassy of Israel, London =

Israeli diplomatic mission in the United Kingdom

שגרירות ישראל בלונדון Embassy of Israel in London
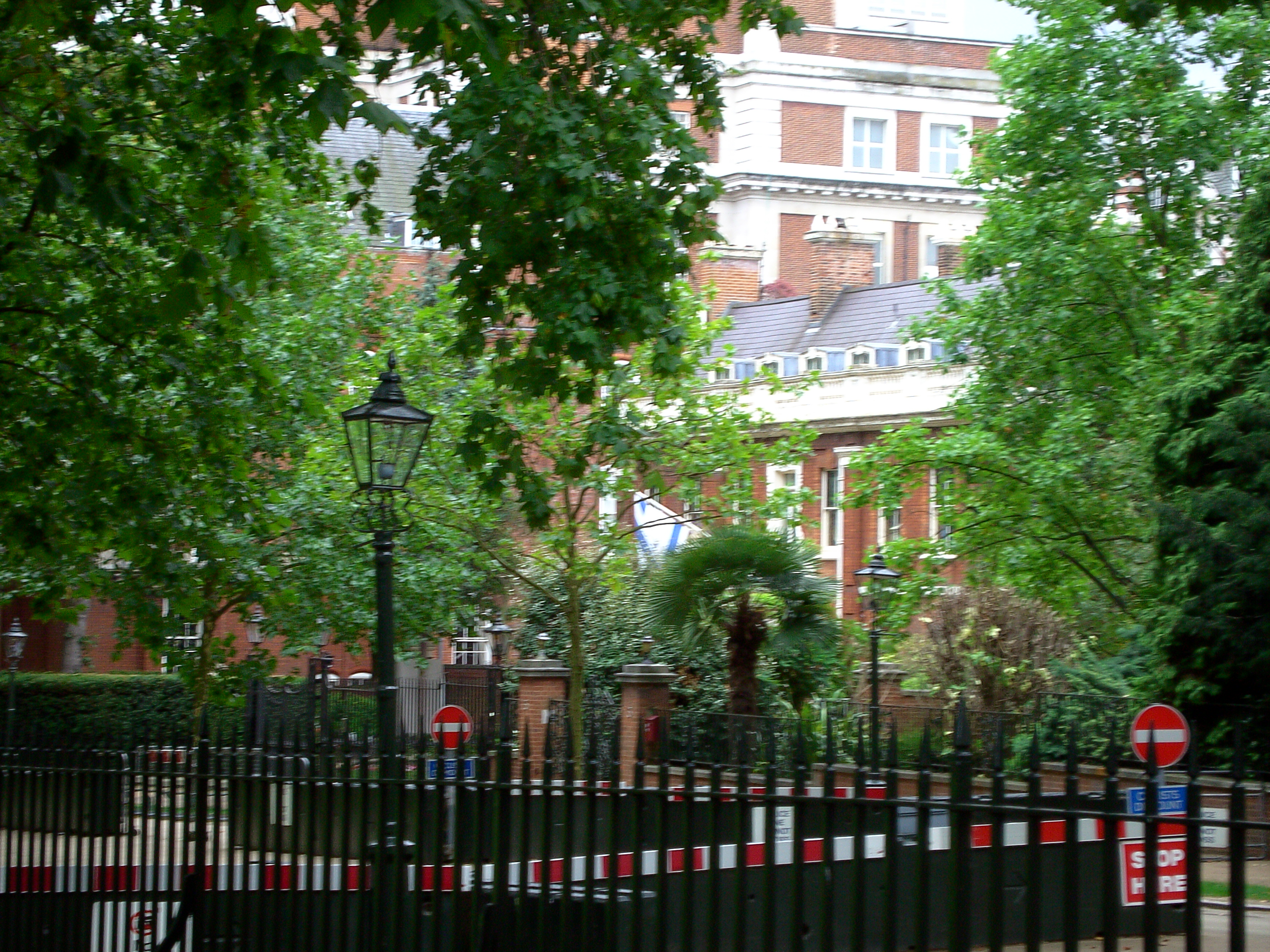
- Location: South Kensington, London
- Address: 2 Palace Green, London, W8 4QB
- Coordinates: 51°30′11″N 0°11′22″W
- Ambassador: Vacant

Designations

Listed Building – Grade II*
- Official name: 2 Palace Green, W8
- Designated: 15 April 1969
- Reference no.: 1357462

The Embassy of Israel in London is the diplomatic mission of Israel in the United Kingdom. It is located in the South Kensington area on Kensington Palace Gardens near the junction with Kensington High Street. The Grade II* listed building hosts both the Embassy of Israel and the Israeli Consulate, accessible via a separate entrance at 15a Old Court Place.

== Location ==
The embassy is situated at 2 Palace Green, the southern section of Kensington Palace Gardens, which is home to Kensington Palace itself as well as a number of other diplomatic delegations, and forms part of the Crown Estate. Security around the embassy is extremely rigorous, and photography of the building is prohibited.

== The building ==
The embassy occupies a house originally built in 1860–62 for the author William Makepeace Thackeray, constructed in red brick at his request. It was granted Grade II* listed status in 1969.

== Security incidents and assassination attempts ==
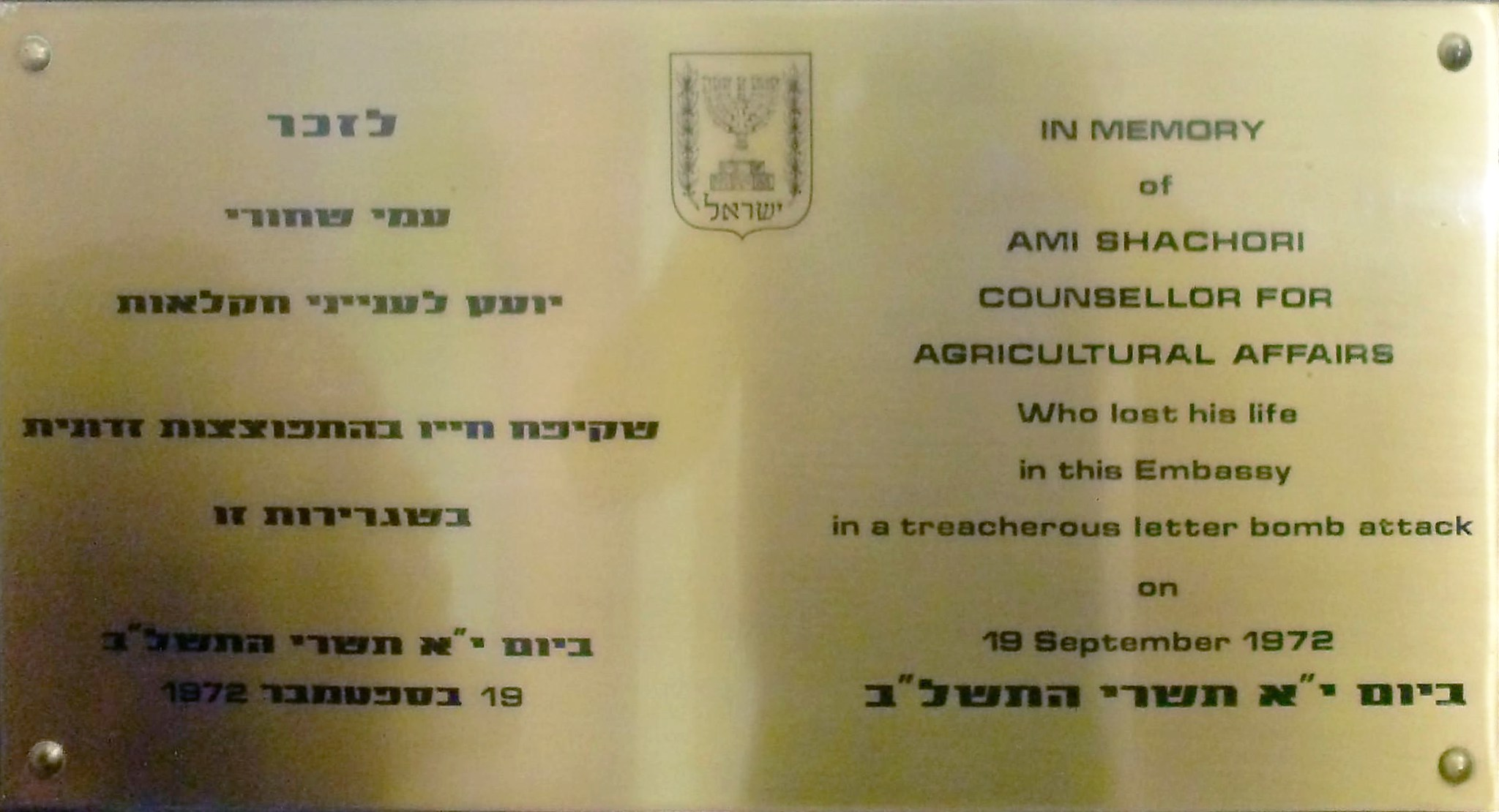
Memorial plaque at the Embassy to Ami Shachori

On 19 September 1972, a letter bomb delivered to the Embassy exploded, killing Ami Shachori, an Israeli diplomat. Seven other bombs claimed to have been sent by the Palestinian terrorist group Black September were either not delivered, or detected.

On 3 June 1982, Ambassador of Israel Shlomo Argov was shot and seriously injured on departing an event at the Dorchester Hotel where he was guest of honour. A terror cell claiming to have split from the PLO and headed by Abu Nidal took credit for the attack. After a lengthy coma, Argov died of his wounds in 2003. The incident is widely reported as being a key factor in the 1982 Lebanon War.

On 26 July 1994, a car bomb exploded outside the embassy, partially destroying the front of the building and injuring 20 people within and outside the building. The blast damaged shops on nearby Kensington High Street, and blew out windows in Kensington Palace. The attack came a day after the leaders of Israel and Jordan had met for peace talks and eight days after the AMIA bombing in Buenos Aires. Thirteen hours after the attack on the embassy another bomb exploded outside a Jewish charity building in north London, injuring six people. Five Palestinians resident in London were arrested in January 1995 in connection with the bombings and two – Jawad Botmeh and Samar Alami – were sentenced to 20 years in jail for their role in the attacks.

A series of demonstrations outside the embassy during December 2008 and January 2009, held in protest at Israel's "Cast Lead" operation in Gaza, were marred by violence and ended in a number of arrests and at least one court sentence for those taking part in the violence.

On 28 April 2025, an armed man was arrested while trespassing on embassy grounds and charged with preparing acts of terrorism. The Metropolitan Police's counter-terrorism division stated that they believed the suspect acted alone.

== Renovations and re-dedication ==
On 15 March 2010, Ambassador of Israel Ron Prosor formally announced the re-dedication of the embassy after an extensive refurbishment programme. As part of the embassy's re-dedication, the original Music Room of the Thackeray house was named in honour of late Ambassador Shlomo Argov.

== See also ==
- Israel–United Kingdom relations
- 1994 London Israeli Embassy bombing
