= Udo Albrecht =

German criminal (born 1940)

Udo Albrecht (born 13 April 1940 in Beyrode, Germany, likely died in 2019) was a far right extremist with a long history of criminal activity dating back to the 1950s including prison escapes, bank robberies, counterfeiting and offences related to explosives and weapons sales.

Albrecht was born in East Germany. He joined the Freikorps Adolf Hitler in 1967. He cultivated close ties with the Palestine Liberation Organization in the 1970s. When the PLO fought Jordanian forces, Albrecht and other neo-Nazis fought alongside the Fedayeen. For this, he was arrested by the Jordanian army. Because of these close ties, during a hostage taking by Black September at the Saudi Arabian Embassy in Khartoum, the group demanded Albrecht's release. After his release, he was arrested again in Vienna in 1971. He was arrested again in Germany in 1976 and was held in a prison in Bonn in solitary confinement on charges of membership in a criminal organization and illegal possession of weapons. He fled to Lebanon in 1981, where he was again arrested.
