= 1973 Rome airport attacks and hijacking =

Terrorist attacks

1973 Rome airport attacks
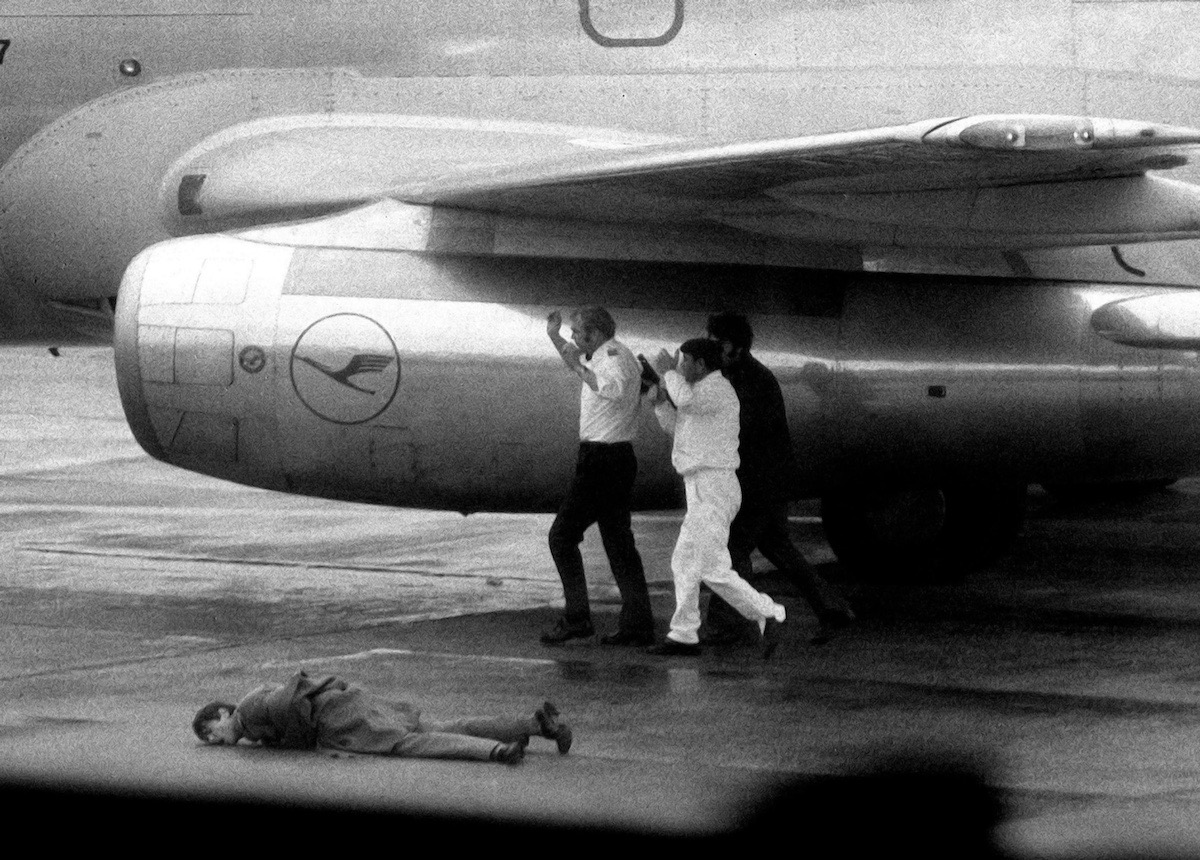

- Initial attack site at Leonardo da Vinci–Fiumicino International Airport in Rome and hijacked airliner landing sites
- Location: 41°48′01″N 12°14′20″E: Rome, Italy (primary); Athens, Greece; Damascus, Syria; Kuwait
- Date: 17–18 December 1973 (CET / UTC+01:00)
- Target: Aircraft in Leonardo da Vinci–Fiumicino Airport
- Attack type: Terrorism, aircraft hijacking, hostage crisis, firebombing
- Deaths: 34
- Injuries: At least 22 (including 1 terrorist)
- Perpetrator: Fatah

In December 1973, Fatah, a Palestinian military organization, executed a series of attacks originating at Rome-Fiumicino Airport in Italy, resulting in the deaths of 34 people. The attacks began with an airport-terminal invasion and hostage-taking, followed by the firebombing of a Pan Am aircraft and the hijacking of a Lufthansa flight.

Pan Am Flight 110 was scheduled to depart from Rome, Italy and arrive in Tehran, Iran, by way of Beirut, Lebanon. On 17 December 1973, shortly before takeoff, the airport terminal and the flight aircraft were attacked and the aircraft was set on fire by armed Palestinian gunmen, resulting in the deaths of thirty persons on the plane and two in the terminal.

Following the Flight 110 attack, the gunmen hijacked Lufthansa Flight 303 and killed two more people. They ended up in the custody of the Kuwaiti authorities.

== Background ==
Since the ousting of the Palestine Liberation Organization (PLO) from Jordan, following the Jordanian-Palestinian civil war, Palestinian military organizations made South Lebanon their headquarters and base of operations, enlisting militants from Palestinian refugee camps. South Lebanon was referred to as Fatah-land, due to the almost complete control of Fatah and other military Palestinian organizations over this -officially Lebanese- area, which they used to stage attacks against Israel, mainly targeting civilians, and to engage in armed operations abroad, termed "acts of terrorism."

== Pan Am Flight 110 ==
Pan Am Flight 110
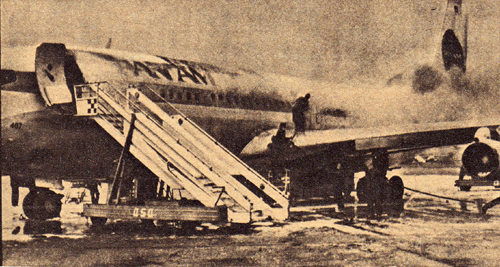
- Clipper Celestial on fire shortly after the attack

Incident
- Date: 17 December 1973
- Summary: Aircraft attack, arson
- Site: Leonardo da Vinci–Fiumicino International Airport; 41°48′01″N 12°14′20″E

Aircraft
- The aircraft involved in the accident, seen in 1965
- Aircraft type: Boeing 707-321B
- Aircraft name: Clipper Celestial
- Operator: Pan Am
- Call sign: CLIPPER 110
- Registration: N407PA
- Flight origin: Leonardo da Vinci–Fiumicino Airport, Italy
- Stopover: Beirut–Rafic Hariri International Airport, Beirut, Lebanon
- Destination: Mehrabad International Airport, Tehran, Iran
- Occupants: 177
- Passengers: 167
- Crew: 10
- Fatalities: 30
- Injuries: 20
- Survivors: 147

On 17 December 1973, Pan Am Flight 110 was scheduled to fly from Leonardo da Vinci International Airport in Rome to Beirut International Airport in Lebanon and then on to Tehran, Iran. At the controls of the Boeing 707-321B (registration N407PA, name Clipper Celestial) were Captain Andrew Erbeck, First Officer Robert Davison, and Flight engineer Kenneth Pfrang.

Pan American Boeing 707-321B (N407PA) Clipper Celestial in 1965

At approximately 12:51 local time in Rome, just as Flight 110 was preparing to taxi, five suspects made their way through the terminal building, armed with automatic firearms and grenades. The terrorists removed submachine guns from hand-luggage bags and began firing throughout the terminal, shattering windows and killing two people. Pilots and crew in the cockpit of the aircraft were able to observe travelers and airport employees in the building running for cover. Captain Erbeck announced over the plane's public address system that there was "some commotion" in the terminal and instructed all the people on board to get down on the floor.

Several of the gunmen ran across the tarmac toward the Pan American jet, throwing one phosphorus incendiary and other hand grenades through the open front and rear doors of the aircraft. The explosions knocked crew and passengers to the ground, and the cabin filled with thick, acrid smoke from the resulting fires. Stewardesses were able to open the emergency exit over the wing on one side of the plane; the other exit was obstructed by gunmen. The crew attempted to evacuate as many passengers as possible through the available exit, but twenty-nine passengers and purser Diana Perez died on the plane, including all eleven passengers in first class. Four Moroccan officials heading to Iran for a visit, and Bonnie Erbeck, wife of the plane's captain, were among the dead. Captain Erbeck survived the attack. Also killed were fourteen Aramco employees and employee family members. The aircraft itself was destroyed.

== Lufthansa Flight 303 ==
Lufthansa Flight 303
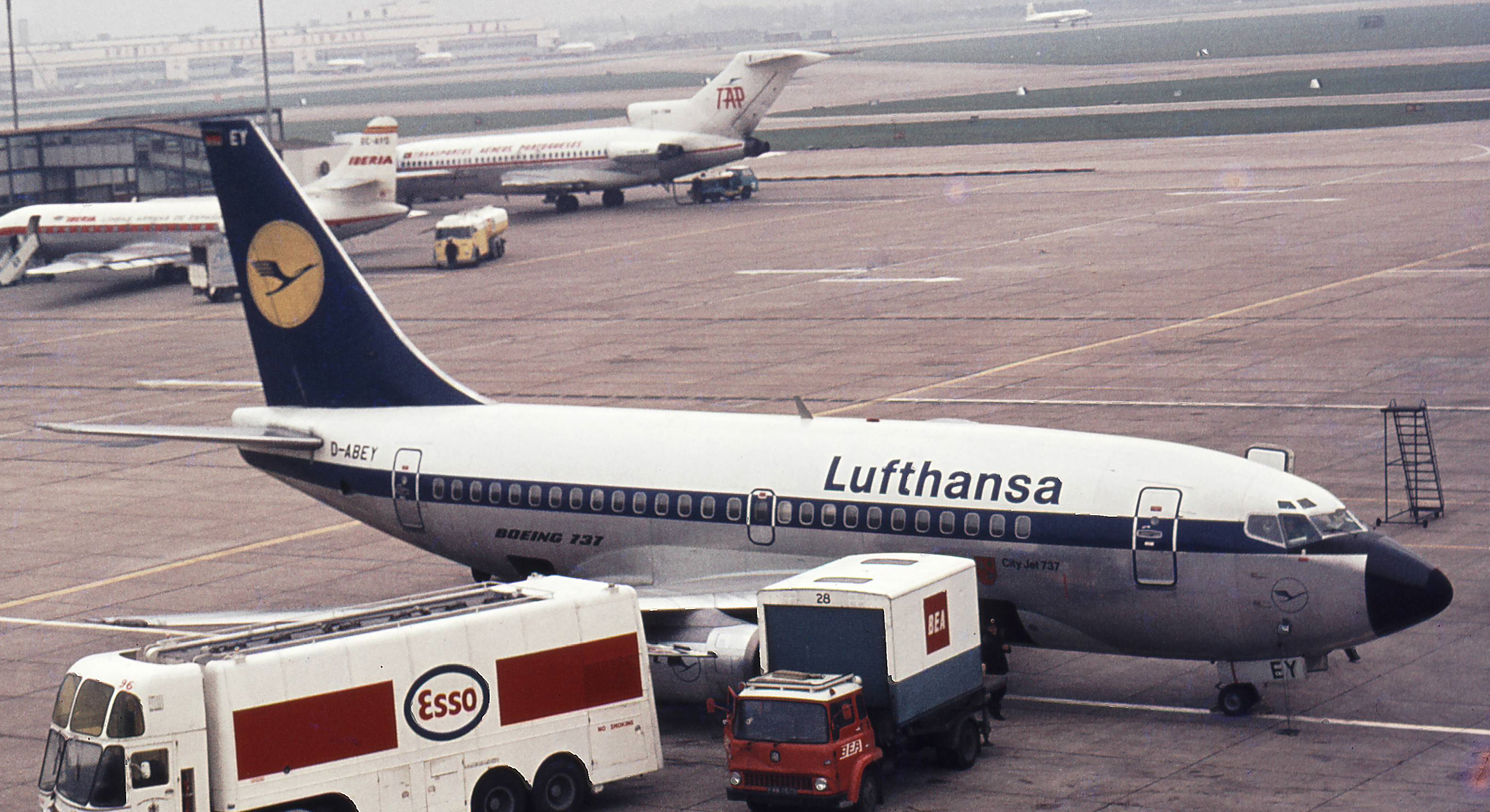
- D-ABEY, the aircraft involved in the hijacking, seen in 1970

Hijacking
- Date: 17 December 1973– 18 December 1973
- Summary: Aircraft hijacking
- Site: Leonardo da Vinci–Fiumicino International Airport in Rome, Italy; 41°48′01″N 12°14′20″E
- Total fatalities: 2
- Total injuries: 2

Aircraft
- Aircraft type: Boeing 737-100
- Operator: Lufthansa
- Call sign: LUFTHANSA 303
- Registration: D-ABEY
- Flight origin: Leonardo da Vinci–Fiumicino Airport
- Destination: Munich-Riem Airport, Munich, West Germany
- Occupants: 19
- Passengers: 15 (including 5 terrorists)
- Crew: 4
- Fatalities: 1
- Injuries: 2
- Survivors: 18

Ground casualties
- Ground fatalities: 1

Having assaulted the Pan Am aircraft, the five gunmen took hostage several Italians and Lufthansa ground crew members into Lufthansa Flight 303, waiting to depart for Munich. An Italian border police officer, 20-year-old Antonio Zara, was shot and killed when he first arrived at the scene of the attack and tried to fight the terrorists, after the general alarm had been sounded by the airport's control tower.

The hijackers then forced the crew already on board to move the plane towards the runway in order to take off. For the first part of the plane's taxiing, the aircraft was chased by several Carabinieri and Guardia di Finanza vehicles, who abandoned the chase after the hijackers threatened to kill all the hostages on board. At 13:32 hours, just over half an hour from the start of the action, the plane took off for Athens, Greece, where it arrived at 16:50 hours, local Athens time.

The attack was too fast to allow an adequate response from the airport's police forces. At the time, 117 officers were on duty at the airport: 9 carabinieri, 46 customs officers and 62 State Police officers, of which 8 were employed in the anti-sabotage service, a negligible number for an intercontinental airport like Fiumicino. The airport structure was unsuitable for the prevention of terrorist attacks, as it was designed at a time when such events were rare.

=== Athens stopover ===
Upon landing in Athens, the terrorists demanded by radio the release of two Palestinian gunmen responsible for an attack on Hellinikon International Airport. They claimed to have killed five hostages, including the plane's first officer. The terrorists then threatened to crash the jet in the middle of Athens if their demands were not met. In reality, only one Italian hostage, Domenico Ippoliti, had been killed and one other hostage wounded. After the refusal of the two detainees to join the commando, they limited their demands to just refuel and leave. The plane took off again from Athens after sixteen hours on the ground and after the gunmen had released the wounded hostage and dumped the body of the dead hostage onto the tarmac.

=== Damascus stopover ===
The plane next headed for Beirut, Lebanon, where Lebanese authorities refused to allow its landing, and blocked the runway with vehicles. Cyprus also refused to allow landing. The terrorists on board ordered the plane to head for Damascus, Syria, allegedly because the plane was running low on fuel. After they landed in the Syrian capital's airport, Air Force Commander Major General Naji Jamil attempted to persuade the Palestinians to release the hostages, but they refused. The Syrians provided food to everyone on board and refueled the plane. They also treated one of the hijackers for a head injury. The plane took off again two to three hours after landing.

=== Landing in Kuwait ===
The commandeered jet headed for Kuwait, where Kuwaiti authorities refused to allow it to land. Captain Kroese was ordered by the terrorists to land anyway on a secondary runway. An hour of negotiations between the terrorists and the Kuwaiti authorities ended with the release of all twelve remaining hostages in exchange for "free passage" to an unknown destination for the hijackers. The terrorists were permitted to retain their weapons and, upon leaving the plane, raised their hands to the cameras in a V-for-victory sign.

== Aftermath ==
The terrorists negotiated their escape, but they were still captured shortly thereafter. The Kuwaiti authorities, after questioning the terrorists, decided not to put them on trial and considered the possibility of handing them over. The factors that came into play at this point were complex, and sparked a diplomatic case that saw the US and many Arab and European countries clashing over the fate of the terrorists and which nation had jurisdiction to prosecute them.

Italy, despite having made a formal request for extradition to the Arab emirate, appeared to have no real intention of detaining and trying the terrorists on its own territory, since the request was bound to fail (Italy had no extradition treaty with Kuwait). What probably encouraged Italy to relent in its efforts to take the matter under its command was the danger that detaining the suspects in Italian prisons could have exposed Italy to retaliation by other Palestinian terrorists in a bid for their release. Subsequently, in fact, the last terrorist who was held in Italy (responsible for the failed attack in Ostia in 1972) was also actually released, probably for the same reason. Other European countries such as the Netherlands also followed this line of thinking. Italy's actions lend credence to the notion that the Italian government had decided to consider the tragic events at Fiumicino in terms of its "national interest", whereby it engaged in compromise that tended towards humiliation.

After gruelling international wrangling, in 1974, Egyptian president Anwar Sadat agreed to the suspects being taken to Cairo under the responsibility of their group, who would process them for conducting an "unauthorized operation". They remained in prison until 24 November 1974, when, following negotiations further to the hijack of a British aircraft in Tunisia (carried out with the precise aim of forcing their release), the five men in the commando were released in Tunisia with the complicity of a good number of Arab and European governments and the US. Thereafter, all news of the men ceased and they were spirited away, perhaps hosted in an Arab country where they went unpunished.

== Gallery ==
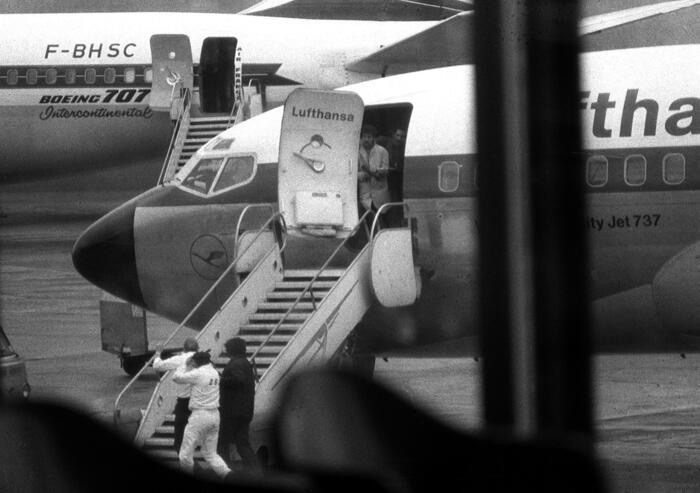

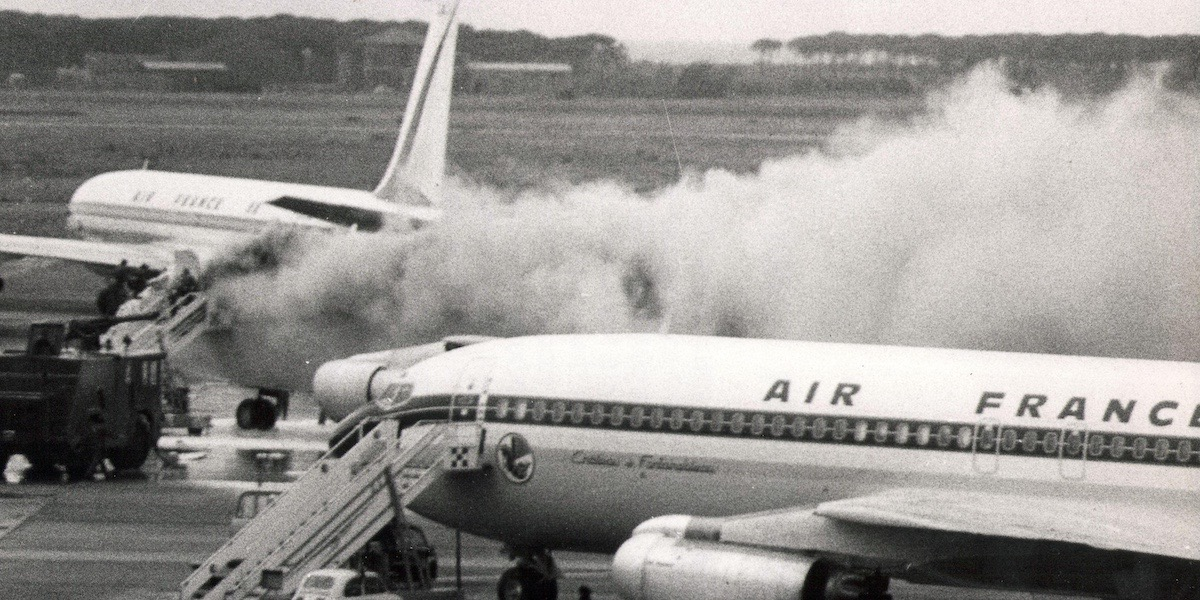

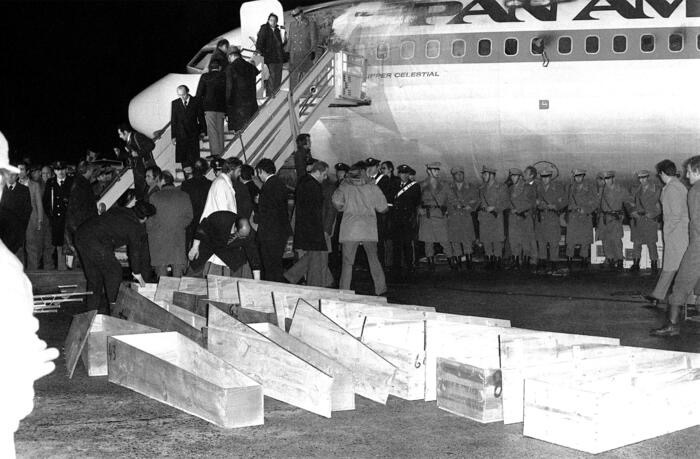

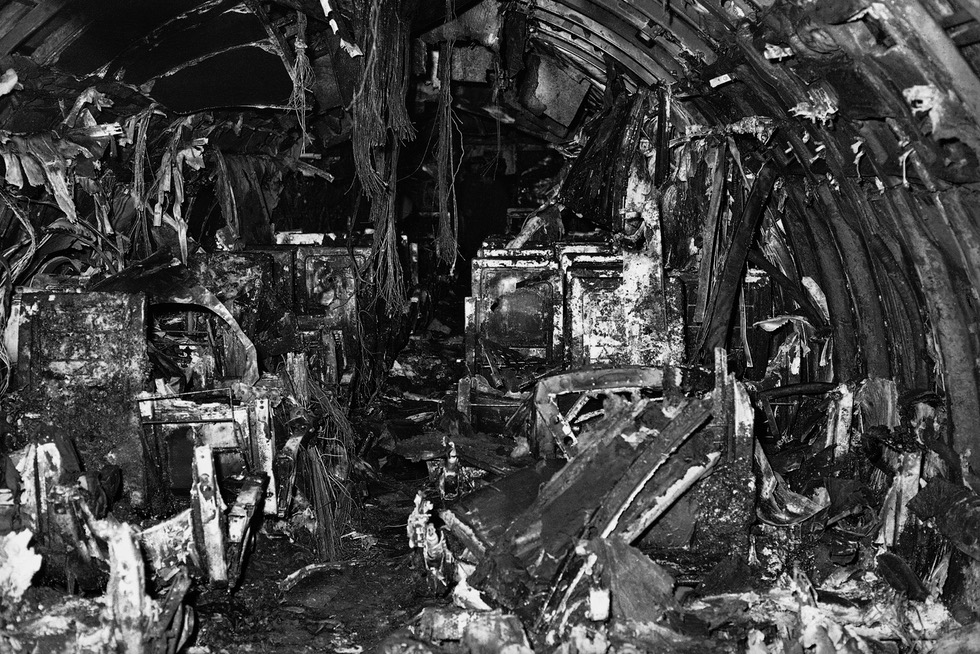

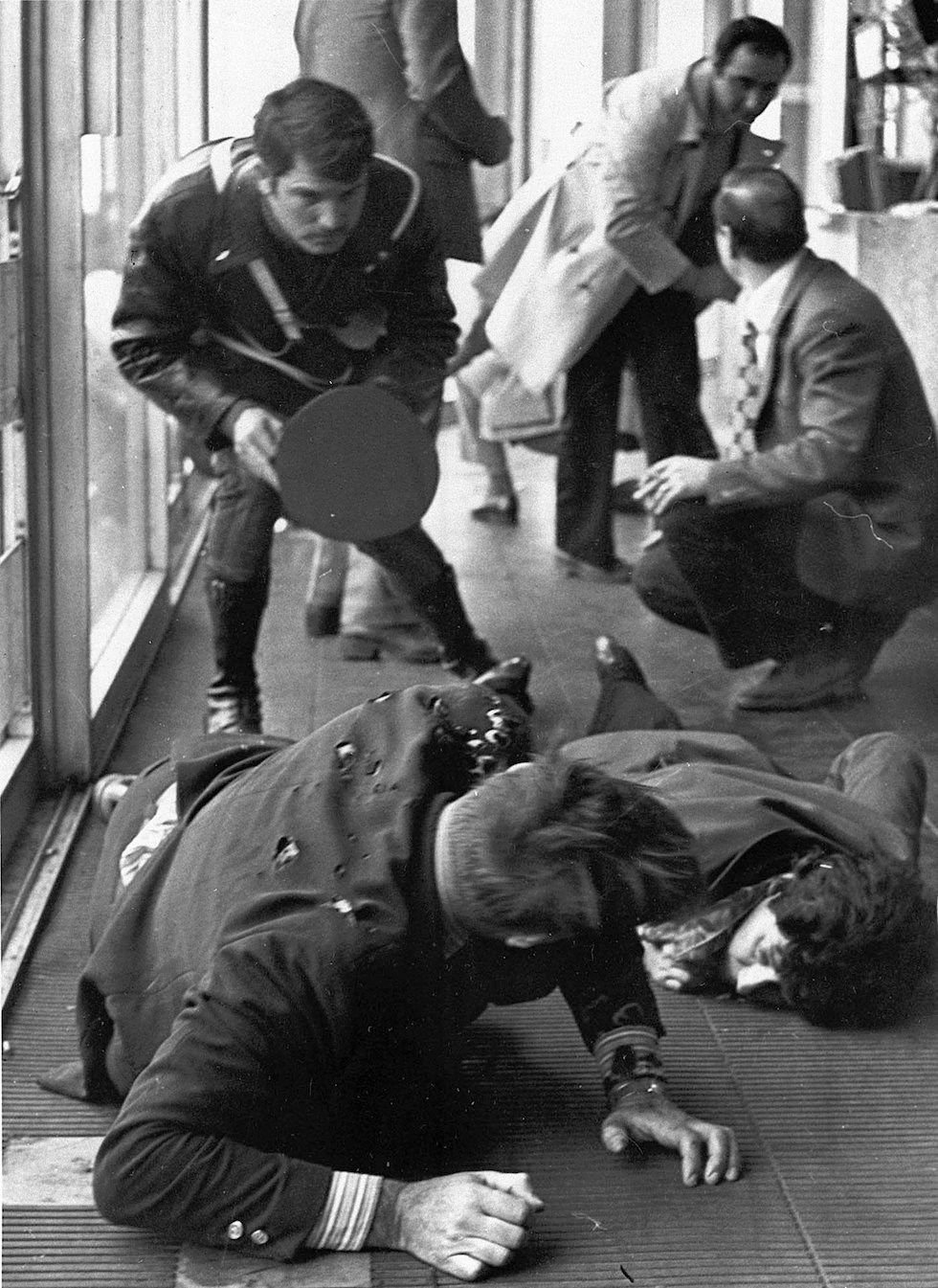

== See also ==
- List of aircraft hijackings
- List of terrorist incidents
- Terrorism in Europe

== Sources ==
- Death in Rome Aboard Flight 110, TIME, 31 December 1973. Retrieved on 10 April 2007. (subscription required)
- "Arab Hijackers Land in Kuwait; Hostages Freed". The New York Times, 19 December 1973. Page 1. (subscription required)
- "Arab Guerrillas Kill 31 in Rome During Attack on U.S. Airliner, Take Hostages and Go to Athens". The New York Times, 18 December 1973. Page 1. (subscription required)
- Athens attack leaves 3 dead, BBC News, 5 August 1973. Retrieved on 10 April 2007.
- Gabriele Paradisi, Rosario Priore: La strage dimenticata Fiumicino 17 December 1973, Reggio Emilia 2015.
