= Mahmoud Mohammad Issa Mohammad =

Airline hijacker

- محمود محمد عيسى محمد

Member of the Popular Front for the Liberation of Palestine
- In office 1968–2013

Personal details
- Born: 1943
- Died: 2015 (aged 71–72) Lebanon

Mahmoud Mohammad Issa Mohammad (Arabic: محمود محمد عيسى محمد) (born in 1943) was a Palestinian former member of the Popular Front for the Liberation of Palestine who took part in an attack that killed a man. After a two-decade battle with Canadian immigration authorities, he was finally deported to Lebanon in 2013. He died from cancer in 2015.

== Background ==
In 1968, Mohammad took part in the attack of a commercial El Al aircraft at an airport in Greece. Under orders of the Popular Front for the Liberation of Palestine, the then-25-year-old and another man hurled grenades and sprayed the plane with machine-gun fire, killing Leon Shirdan, a 50-year-old Israeli maritime engineer. After the attack, the Associated Press described the aircraft as "blazing, smoking" and "bullet-riddled".

Mohammad and his accomplice were arrested at the airport. In 1970 he was convicted of manslaughter and other charges and sentenced to 17 years in jail. However, he was freed a few months later after another Palestinian terrorist group hijacked a plane and threatened to kill the passengers unless the government released Mohammad.

After being pardoned by Greece, Mohammad lived in different parts of the Middle East, including Lebanon, where he married his wife in 1976. The couple spent a few months in Cyprus in the 1980s, until he was barred from re-entering the country for security reasons in 1984.

== Life in Canada and legal battle ==
In 1987, he applied for residency in Canada while failing to disclose his membership in the PFLP and his criminal history.

On December 15, 1988, an immigration adjudicator ruled Mohammad should be expelled from the country because he had concealed his role in the 1968 politically motivated attack in Greece. However, before he could be deported, he filed a refugee claim and was able to avoid deportation for more than 25 years due to appeals and legal maneuvering. He lived in Brantford, Ontario, with his wife Fadia Khalil. He had three children and two grandchildren.

In 2001, the refugee board's appeal division concluded that Mohammad was a "terrorist" under Canada's Immigration and Refugee Act and upheld his deportation. However, Mohammad was granted another pre-removal risk assessment in 2006, which meant a new hearing and a re-evaluation of an earlier risk assessment that found it would not mean his certain death to send him to a Lebanese refugee camp.

Mohammad denied he was a terrorist, stating in 1988 that: "I was a freedom fighter – not a terrorist. I was fighting Israel, the enemy of (his people)... My record in Canada is clean, clear and good." He also stated, regarding efforts to deport him that "I'll fight to the last moment. I am not going to give up." When asked by a FOX News reporter about whether he regretted his crime, he responded: "[It's] not your business. [It's] not your business... This is not your business."

As of March 2011, it has been estimated that Mohammad's 23-year legal case has cost Canadian taxpayers over $3 million. James Bissett, a former Canadian diplomat, who now works with Centre for Immigration Policy Reform, cited Mohammad's case as "the classic case" demonstrating the flaws in Canada's immigration and refugee system, noting that: "He's still here and his case is still before the court. It's cost the taxpayer $3 million and he's not paying."

== Deportation in 2013 ==
On May 11, 2013, after fighting deportation for more than 25 years, Mohammad was deported from Canada to Lebanon. At a press conference, Canadian Immigration Minister Jason Kenney praised the deportation, stating:

"After a 26-year stay in Canada, we finally succeeded in deporting this convicted terrorist killer. Mr. Mahmoud Mohammad Issa Mohammad represents just how broken Canada's immigration and refugee determination systems had become under previous governments...[Mohammad] lied about his identity a criminal past, he lied about not having ties to terrorist organizations...Mr. Mohammad flagrantly violated Canada's fair immigration laws and this country's generosity. He made a mockery of our legal system."

At the same conference, Kenney cited Mohammad's case as a failure of Canada's immigration system, stating that: "This case is almost a comedy of errors, with delays, with a system that was so bogged down in redundant process and endless appeals that it seemed to some that we would never be able to enforce the integrity of Canada's immigration system and deport this terrorist killer.

Phil McColeman, the Member of Parliament for Brant, praised the deportation, stating that

"As country we accept people from all over the world who want to come to Canada and we expect that when they come here they are law-abiding citizens who play by the rules. We can't and we shouldn't tolerate it when people misrepresent themselves in order to get into Canada...What do we say to the thousands of others who are law-abiding citizens who are honest about their background and who want to come to Canada. To do otherwise, to allow someone like him to stay, we'd be legitimizing misrepresenting yourself to get into Canada and saying that well, if you do that, and stay here long enough, we'll forget about it."

Commenting on Mohammad's deportation, Shimon Fogel, CEO of the Centre for Israel and Jewish Affairs (CIJA), stated: "It really was a thorn in our side, much like some of the known Nazi war criminals who were able to dodge the system. There was just something glaringly unjust about his ability to take advantage of everything that Canada had to offer even though he had blood on his hands." Fogel further stated that "Although long delayed, justice was ultimately not denied in this case. Just as it is critical that we provide swift and compassionate support to legitimate refugees, it is likewise essential that we prevent Canada from being used as a safe haven for terrorists."

His deportation was welcomed by the family of Leon Shirdan, the Israeli man who was killed in the 1968 attack. His grandson, Ran Shirdan, who also lives in Canada, stated that his family had "no sense of closure" until "Canada announced the deportation of this revolting excuse for a human being", stating that the deportation was "Way late — but late better than never."

Mohammad's deportation was criticized by immigration lawyer Lorne Waldman, who claimed it was evidence of a pro-Israel stance of the Conservative government of Stephen Harper. Mohammad's lawyer, Barbara Jackman, expressed concern that Mohammad would not be able to afford proper medical treatment in Lebanon.

== Personal life ==
Mohammad died from cancer in 2015.
