= Olympic Airways Flight 255 =

1970 terrorist attack on a Boeing 727

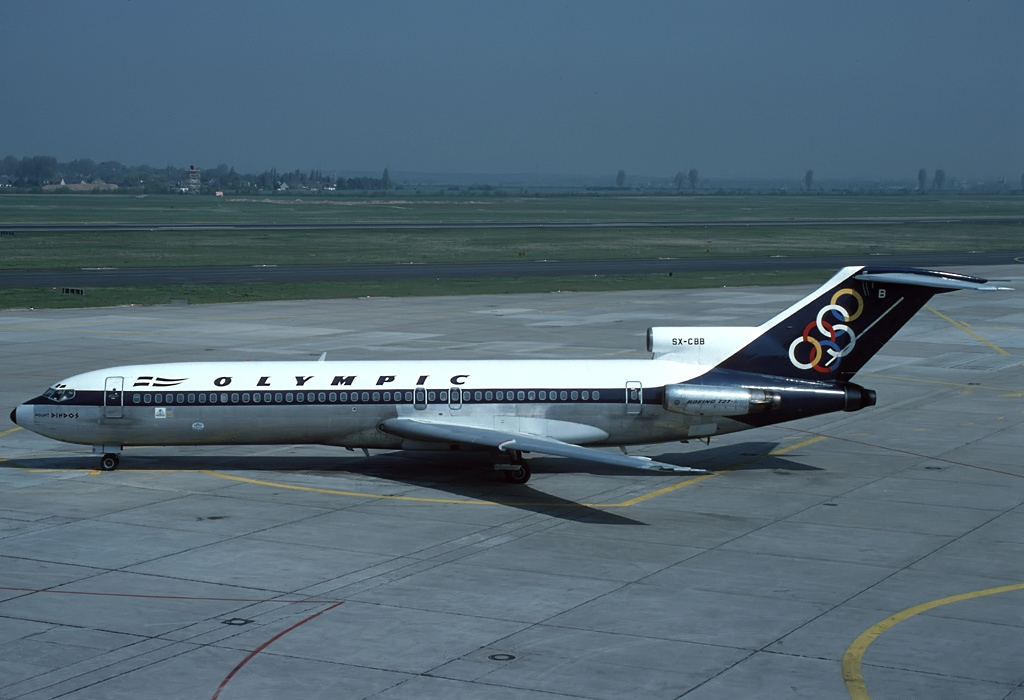
- An Olympic Airways 727, similar to the one involved in the hijacking.

Hijacking
- Date: 22 July 1970
- Summary: Hijacking
- Site: over Rhodes, Greece

Aircraft
- Aircraft type: Boeing 727
- Operator: Olympic Airways
- Flight origin: Beirut Airport, Beirut, Lebanon
- Destination: Athens, Greece
- Passengers: 47 (including 6 hijackers)
- Crew: 8
- Fatalities: 0
- Survivors: 55

On 22 July 1970, Olympic Airways Flight 255 was hijacked by Palestinian terrorists over Rhodes, Greece, after it had taken off from Beirut, Lebanon en route to Athens, Greece. The hijackers demanded and successfully negotiated the release of seven Palestinian terrorists held in Greek prisons.

== Hijacking ==
The six-person commando of hijackers, belonging to the Popular Front for the Liberation of Palestine (PFLP) and/or the Palestinian Popular Struggle Front (PSF), demanded the release of seven Palestinians held in Greek prisons for three terrorist incidents, the El Al Flight 253 attack, the attempted hijacking of a TWA flight on 21 December 1969, and the 1969 Athens airline office attack. The hijackers threatened to blow up the plane if their demands were not met.

In response to the hijacking, the owner of the airliner, Aristotle Onassis, flew to Athens, and along with Stylianos Pattakos, the Greek Deputy Premier and Interior Minister, and Justice Minister Anghelos Tsou, attempted to negotiate with the hijackers, with all three offering to exchange themselves as hostages with the passengers. While their offers were rejected, it was through the mediation of the International Red Cross representative André Rochat at the Athens Ellinikon International Airport, that the Greek government eventually announced eight hours after the plane had landed that all the terrorists would be released within one month, while announcing that it had received assurances from Arab diplomats that Greece would never again be used for terrorist activities.

While the passengers were released in Athens, the hijackers subsequently ordered the flight flown to Cairo, Egypt with five crew members and Rochat who had voluntarily offered himself as a captive as a voucher for the promised release of the seven terrorists. The hijackers were greeted at the Cairo Airport by President Gamal Abdel Nasser and given a hero's welcome. The plane was returned to Athens the next day. The terrorists held in Greek prisons were eventually released in August, despite objections from the Israeli government.

The submission of the Greek government to the hijackers' demands have been said to have encouraged a number of further hijackings, notably including the Dawson's Field hijackings later the same year.
