= 1973 New York City bomb plot =

Terrorist plot in the United States

Coordinates: 40°46′58″N 73°57′34″W

On March 4th 1973, Palestinian terrorist group Black September attempted to detonate three car bombs in New York City at the same time Israeli prime minister Golda Meir was set to arrive. The bombs failed to explode. The main suspect, Khalid Duhham Al-Jawary, was not caught until January 1991. The attempted attack was the first such Black September operation within the United States.

== Background ==
Black September was formed in 1970, after the Black September conflict between Palestinians and Jordanians erupted in Jordan that same year. In September 1972, it caught world attention with the massacre of 11 Israeli athletes and coaches at the 1972 Summer Olympics in Munich. Israel soon responded with the Mossad assassinations following the Munich massacre. In early March 1973, the group attacked the Saudi embassy in Khartoum, killing the U.S. Ambassador and Deputy Chief of Mission as well as the Belgian Chargé d'affaires.

== Plot ==
=== Planning ===
On January 12, 1973, Khalid Duhham Al-Jawary, described in a federal warrant as a 27-year-old Iraqi linked to Black September but self-described as a Palestinian who grew up in Jordan, flew through Montreal to Boston, and then on to New York City. On January 17 the FBI, acting on a tip received in Tel Aviv, interviewed Al-Jawary about his activities. Al-Jawary claimed to be in flight training at Teterboro Airport, and would leave a month to become a commercial pilot in the Mideast. During his time in New York, Al-Jawary became friendly with a woman named Carol, and used trips to Manhattan with her son Todd in order to reconnoiter targets without arousing suspicion.

=== Car bombs ===
Just days after the Khartoum killings, around March 4, 1973, Al-Jawary took three rented cars rigged with explosives and placed them around various Israeli targets in the city; one at Fifth Avenue and 47th Street at the First Israel Bank and Trust company, another at Fifth Avenue and 43rd Street at an Israel Discount Bank, and a third at El-Al's cargo terminal at John F. Kennedy International Airport.

The bombs consisted of gasoline, propane tanks, and Semtex, as well as batteries and blasting caps. The two cars on Fifth Avenue had alarm clocks for timing the detonators, whereas the one at JFK, two times as powerful, utilized an advanced electronic timer known as an "e-cell". In addition to the explosives, someone had placed Black September propaganda in the cars, concealed in Hebrew language newspapers.

According to a Federal agent at the time, the explosives were supposed to detonate at noon on March 4 with the arrival of Prime Minister Meir in the city. However, the bombs never detonated, a failure which the FBI ascribed at the time to "an error in the circuitry system."

== Discovery ==
According to an Associated Press investigation released in 2009, the National Security Agency had intercepted an encrypted message sent from official Iraqi diplomatic communications in the United States to the Iraqi foreign ministry in Baghdad (and then the Palestine Liberation Organization), which revealed the plot and the bombs' locations. At 7:15 pm on March 6, officials from the FBI and New York Police Department started a search for the car bombs. All three cars were found: the two on Fifth Avenue had been towed and impounded at Pier 56 on March 5, and subsequently discovered on March 7 by their rental agency, while the car at the airport was found early in the morning on March 7 and disabled by NYPD bomb squad member Terence McTigue.

According to the FBI, the detonation of one of the bombs by police caused a fireball 50 to 75 feet high and 25 feet wide, creating a potential fatality zone of 100 yards that could have killed hundreds. They soon issued a warrant for the arrest of the main suspect, Al-Jawary, but also stated publicly at the time, "It would have been a pretty tough job for one man."

== Aftermath ==
In the immediate aftermath of the failed attack the FBI launched a massive investigation for the case, codenamed Tribomb. Three hundred FBI agents took part, recovering 60 fingerprints identified as those of Al-Jawary and conducting hundreds of interviews. Despite immediately issuing a warrant for the arrest of Al-Jawary, he managed to escape the country, but in 1991, while flying from Iraq to Tunis for the funeral of Abu Iyad, he was detained in Rome for use of a false Jordanian passport. A few months later Italian authorities handed over custody to the FBI, who flew Al-Jawary to stand trial in Brooklyn. In April 1993, he was sentenced to 30 years in prison. Al-Jawary was released on February 19, 2009 from the U.S. Federal prison system and handed over to U.S. immigration officials.

== See also ==
- List of terrorist incidents, 1973
- Terrorism in the United States
