= Sabena Flight 571 =

1972 aircraft hijacking in Lod, Israel

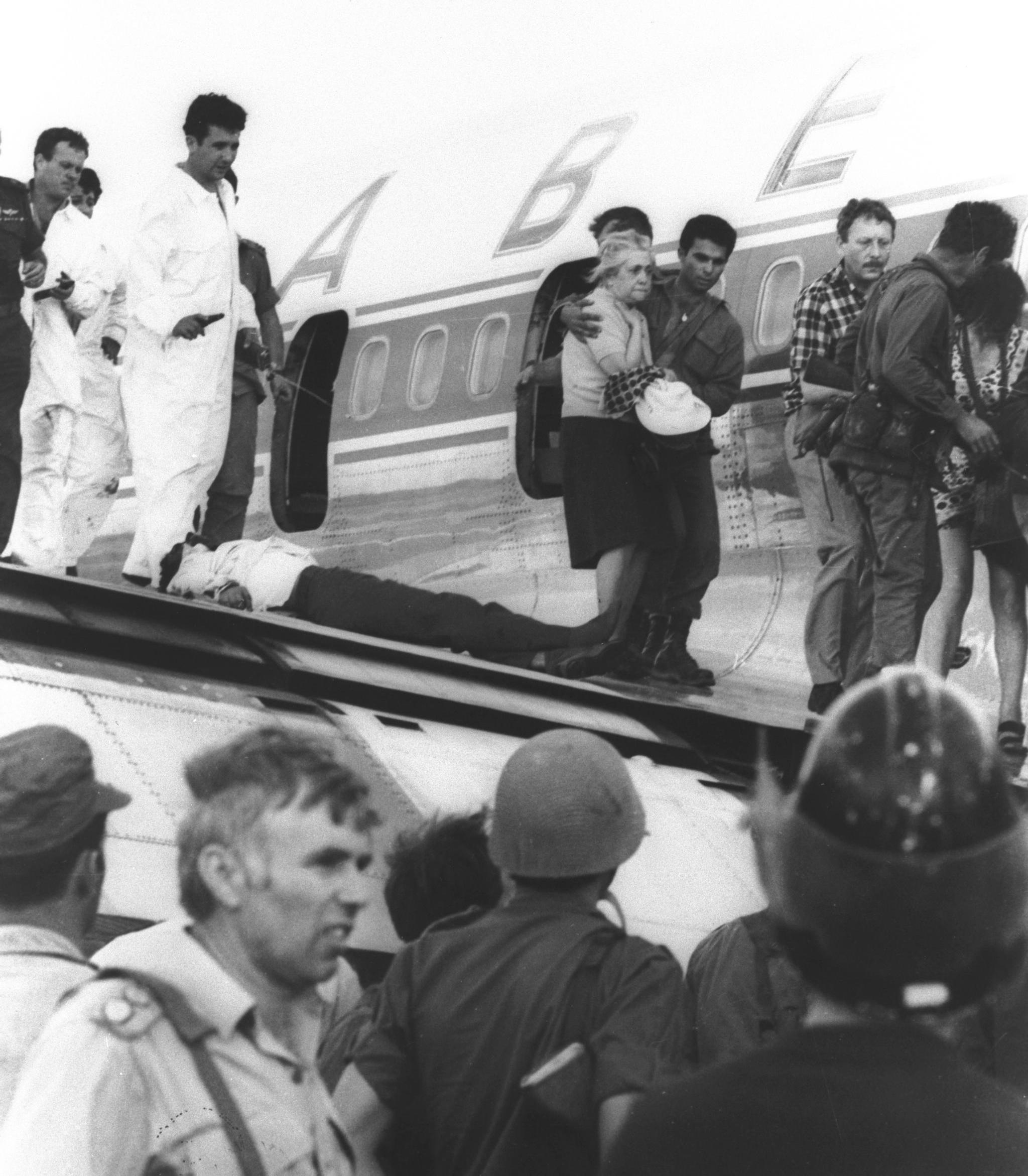
- Israeli soldiers rescuing hostages on the plane

Hijacking
- Date: 8 May 1972
- Summary: Hijacking
- Site: Tel Aviv-Lod International Airport, Lod, Israel; 32.0094°N 34.8769°E

Aircraft
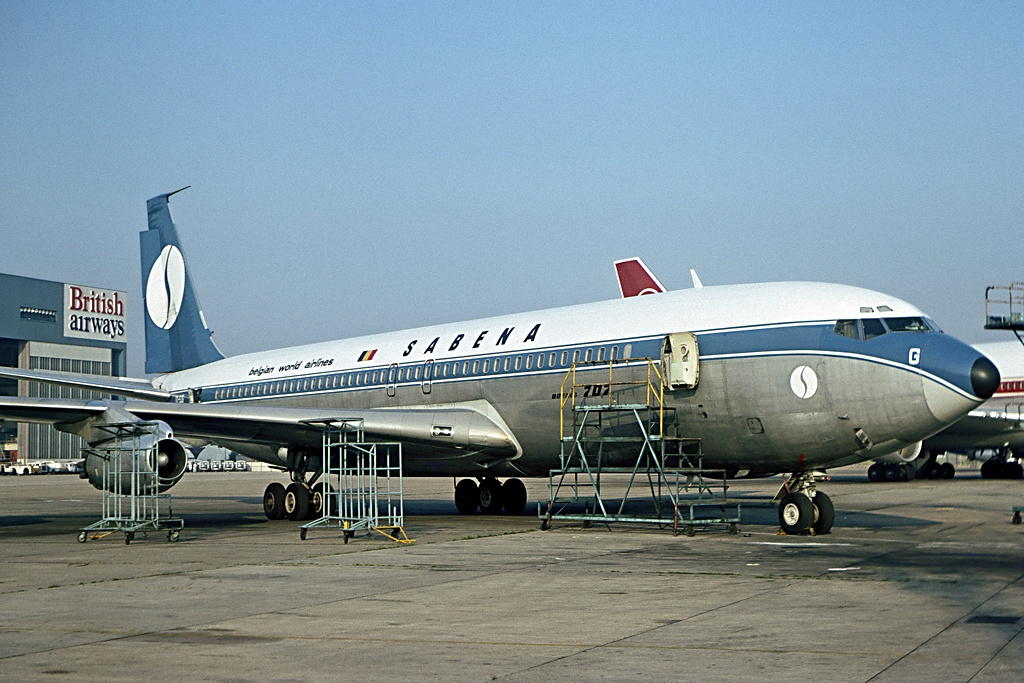
- The aircraft involved in the incident, seen on 7 June 1976
- Aircraft type: Boeing 707-329C (Note: The aircraft was a Boeing 707-320C model. Boeing used customer codes to identify the original customer for each airframe from 1958 until 2016. 29 is the code for Sabena, hence the designation 707-329C.)
- Operator: Sabena
- Registration: OO-SJG
- Flight origin: Brussels Airport, Brussels, Belgium
- Stopover: Vienna International Airport, Vienna, Austria
- Destination: Lod Airport, Tel Aviv, Israel
- Passengers: 94 (inc. 4 hijackers)
- Crew: 7
- Fatalities: 3 (1 passenger, 2 hijackers)
- Injuries: 3 (2 passengers, 1 commando)
- Survivors: 98 (inc. 2 hijackers)

Sabena Flight 571 was a scheduled passenger flight from Brussels to Tel Aviv via Vienna, operated by the Belgian national airline, Sabena. On 8 May 1972, a Boeing 707 passenger aircraft operating that service, captained by British pilot Reginald Levy, DFC, was hijacked by four members of the Black September Organization, a Palestinian terrorist group.

Following their instructions, Captain Levy landed the plane at Lod Airport in Israel. The hijackers demanded Israel release Palestinian prisoners in exchange for the hostages. The standoff was ended by an Israeli commando raid in which all of the hijackers were killed or captured.

== Hijacking ==
The attack, planned by Ali Hassan Salameh, was carried out by a group of two men and two women who pretended to be two couples: the group's leader Ali Taha Abu Snina, plus Abed al-Aziz Atrash, Rima Tannous and Theresa Halsa. They were armed with two handguns, two hand grenades and two belts of explosives. Twenty minutes out of Vienna, the hijackers entered the cockpit. "As you can see," Captain Levy told the 90 passengers, "we have friends aboard." He concealed from the hijackers that his wife was a passenger on the plane, traveling with him to celebrate his birthday in Tel Aviv.

Soon after taking command, the hijackers separated the Jewish hostages from the others and sent them to the back of the aircraft. When the plane landed, the hijackers demanded the release of 315 convicted Palestinian terrorists imprisoned in Israel, and threatened to blow up the airplane with its passengers. Captain Levy managed to send the Israelis a coded message requesting help.

Defense Minister Moshe Dayan and Transport Minister Shimon Peres, who would become Prime Minister and later President of Israel, conducted negotiations with the hijackers while preparing a rescue operation, code-named "Operation Isotope". Captain Levy said he talked to the hijackers about everything "from navigation to sex" while the passengers and crew waited to be rescued.

On 9 May 1972 at 4:00 p.m. the rescue operation began: a team of 16 Sayeret Matkal commandos, led by Ehud Barak and including Benjamin Netanyahu, both future Israeli prime ministers, approached the aircraft disguised as aircraft technicians in white coveralls. Having immobilized it during the preceding night by deflating some of the landing gear tires, they convinced the hijackers that its hydraulic system needed repair. They then stormed the aircraft, killing both male hijackers within two minutes.

They captured the two female hijackers and rescued all 90 remaining passengers. Three passengers were wounded in the exchange of fire, one of whom later died of her injuries. Netanyahu was wounded during the rescue when another commando, Marko Ashkenazi, accidentally discharged his gun as he used it to hit Theresa Halsa. The bullet passed through her and penetrated Netanyahu's biceps.

== Aftermath ==
Halsa and Rima Tannous were eventually sentenced to life imprisonment—Halsa for 220 years. They were freed in November 1983, in a prisoner exchange after the 1982 Lebanon War. Halsa later passed away on 28 March 2020 due to cancer in Jordan. Prior to Halsa's death, she told Israeli newspaper Maariv that she "doesn't regret the operation".

Sabena continued to operate the aircraft for another five years, until it was purchased by Israel Aircraft Industries. It was eventually sold to the Israeli Air Force, and served as a spy plane for many years, participating in most of the Air Force's long-range operations.

Captain Levy, a Royal Air Force veteran who took part in strategic bombing missions over Germany during World War II and also in the Berlin airlift, had joined Sabena in 1952. He retired in 1982. He died of a heart attack, at a hospital near his home in Dover on 1 August 2010. The hijacking took place on his 50th birthday.

== In media ==
- From Night Flak to Hijack: It's a Small World, autobiography by Captain Reginald Levy DFC.
- Sabena Hijacking: My Version, Israeli docudrama depicting the hijacking and rescue, in which three Prime Ministers of Israel were involved.
