= Black September Organization =

Palestinian militant organization (1970 – c. 1988)

- منظمة أيلول الأسود
- Leaders: Salah Khalaf † (founder); Abu Daoud; Amin al-Hindi
- Dates active: September 1970 – c. 1988
- Active regions: Global, mostly concentrated in Europe and the Middle East
- Ideology: Palestinian nationalism Anti-Zionism
- Status: Inactive
- Part of: Fatah (alleged)

The Black September Organization (BSO; Arabic: منظمة أيلول الأسود, romanized: Munaẓẓamat Aylūl al-Aswad) was a Palestinian militant organization, which was founded in September 1970. Besides other actions, the group was responsible for the assassination of the Jordanian Prime Minister Wasfi Tal, and the Munich massacre, in which eleven Israeli athletes and officials were kidnapped and killed, as well as a West German policeman dying, during the 1972 Summer Olympics in Munich, their most publicized event. These attacks led to the creation or specialization of permanent counter-terrorism forces in many European countries.

== Origin ==
Newsreel about the 1970 events

The group's name is derived from the Black September conflict (1970 – 71, also known as the Jordanian Civil War) which began on 16 September 1970, when King Hussein of Jordan declared military rule in response to the Dawson's Field hijackings by the Popular Front for the Liberation of Palestine (PFLP), with the aftermath of the conflict resulting in the deaths and expulsions of thousands of Palestinians from Jordan. The BSO began as a small cell of Fatah men determined to take revenge upon King Hussein and the Jordanian Armed Forces. Recruits from the PFLP, as-Sa'iqa, and other groups also joined.

Initially, most of its members were dissidents within Fatah who had been close to Abu Ali Iyad, the commander of Fatah forces in northern Jordan who continued to fight the Jordanian Army after the PLO leadership withdrew. He was killed, allegedly through execution, by Jordanian forces on 23 July 1971. It was alleged by them that the Jordanian Prime Minister at the time, Wasfi Tal, was personally responsible for his torture and death.

== Structure of the group ==
There is disagreement among historians, journalists, and primary sources about the nature of the BSO and the extent to which it was controlled by Fatah, the Palestine Liberation Organization (PLO) faction controlled at the time by Yasser Arafat.

In his book Stateless, Salah Khalaf (Abu Iyad), Arafat's chief of security and a founding member of Fatah, wrote that: "Black September was not a terrorist organization, but was rather an auxiliary unit of the resistance movement, at a time when the latter was unable to fully realize its military and political potential. The members of the organization always denied any ties between their organization and Fatah or the PLO."

The denial described in Abu Iyad's claim was mutual: according to a 1972 article in the Jordanian newspaper Ad-Dustour, Mohammed Daoud Oudeh, also known as Abu Daoud, a BSO operative and former senior PLO member, told Jordanian police: "There is no such organization as Black September. Fatah announces its own operations under this name so that Fatah will not appear as the direct executor of the operation." A March 1973 document released in 1981 by the U.S. State Department seemed to confirm that Fatah was Black September's parent organization.

According to American journalist John K. Cooley, the BSO represented a "total break with the old operational and organizational methods of the fedayeen. Its members operated in air-tight cells of four or more men and women. Each cell's members were kept purposely ignorant of other cells. Leadership was exercised from outside by intermediaries and 'cut-offs' [sic]", though there was no centralized leadership.

Cooley writes that many of the cells in Europe and around the world were made up of Palestinians and other Arabs who had lived in their countries of residence as students, teachers, businessmen, and diplomats for many years. Operating without a central leadership, it was a "true collegial direction". The cell structure and the need-to-know operational philosophy protected the operatives by ensuring that the apprehension or surveillance of one cell would not affect the others. The structure offered plausible deniability to the Fatah leadership, which was careful to distance itself from Black September operations.

Fatah needed Black September, according to historian Benny Morris. He writes that there was a "problem of internal PLO or Fatah cohesion, with extremists constantly demanding greater militancy. The moderates apparently acquiesced in the creation of Black September in order to survive". As a result of pressure from militants, writes Morris, a Fatah congress in Damascus in August–September 1971 agreed to establish Black September. The new organization was based on Fatah's existing special intelligence and security apparatus, and on the PLO offices and representatives in various European capitals, and from very early on, there was cooperation between Black September and the PFLP.

The PLO closed Black September down in September 1973, on the anniversary it was created by the "political calculation that no more good would come of terrorism abroad" according to Morris. In 1974 Arafat ordered the PLO to withdraw from acts of violence outside the West Bank, the Gaza Strip and Israel.

== Munich massacre ==
The group was responsible for the 1972 Munich massacre in which eleven Israeli Olympic athletes were murdered, nine of whom were first taken hostage, and the killing of a German police officer, during the 1972 Summer Olympics in Munich, Germany.

Following the attack, the Israeli government, headed by Prime Minister Golda Meir, launched an assassination campaign and ordered Mossad to assassinate those known to have been involved in the Munich massacre. By 1979, at least one Mossad unit had assassinated eight Black September and PLO members, including Ali Hassan Salameh, nicknamed the "Red Prince", the wealthy, flamboyant son of an upper-class family, and commander of Force 17, Yasser Arafat's personal security squad. Salameh was also behind the 1972 hijacking of Sabena Flight 572 from Vienna to Lod. He was killed by a car bomb in Beirut on 22 January 1979. During a raid in Lebanon in April 1973, Israeli commandos killed three senior members of Black September in Beirut. In July 1973, in what became known as the Lillehammer affair, Ahmed Bouchiki, an innocent Moroccan waiter who was mistaken for Ali Hassan Salameh was killed in Norway. Six Israeli operatives were arrested for the murder.

Remarks in 2010 by Abu Daoud, the alleged mastermind of the Munich kidnappings, deny that any of the Palestinians assassinated by Mossad had any relation to the Munich operation, despite the fact that the list includes two of the three surviving members of the kidnap squad arrested at the airport.

== Other attacks ==
Other actions attributed to Black September include:

- 28 November 1971: the assassination of Jordan's prime minister, Wasfi al-Tal, in retaliation for the expulsion of the PLO from Jordan in 1970–71;
- December 1971: the attempted assassination of Zaid Rifai, Jordan's ambassador to London and former chief of the Jordanian royal court;
- 6 February 1972: sabotage of a West German electrical installation and gas plants in Ravenstein and Ommen in the Netherlands and in Hamburg in West Germany;
- 8 May 1972: hijacking of a Belgian aircraft, Sabena Flight 572, flying from Vienna to Lod.
- September and October 1972: dozens of letter bombs were sent from Amsterdam to Israeli diplomatic posts around the world, killing Israeli Agricultural Counsellor Ami Shachori in Britain.
- 23 January 1973: assassination of Mossad officer Baruch Cohen in Madrid.
- 1 March 1973: Attack on the Saudi Embassy in Khartoum, Sudan: 10 hostages were held at the Saudi Arabian embassy, five of them diplomats. The US ambassador, the US deputy ambassador, and the Belgian chargé d'affaires were murdered. The remaining hostages were released. A 1973 United States Department of State document, declassified in 2006, concluded: "The Khartoum operation was planned and carried out with the full knowledge and personal approval of Yasser Arafat."
- 2 March 1973: 1973 New York bomb plot
- 5 August 1973: two Palestinian militants claiming affiliation with Black September opened fire on a passenger lounge in Athens' now closed Ellinikon International Airport, killing three and wounding 55. A Lufthansa Boeing 737 was hijacked from Rome in December 1973 to demand that the gunmen be freed from Greek custody.
- 20 October 1981: Black September claimed responsibility for the 1981 Antwerp synagogue bombing in Belgium, which killed three and wounded 106 people.

== In media ==
The 1977 film Black Sunday centers on a fictional Black September plot to attack the Super Bowl. The 2005 film Munich depicts the Munich massacre and subsequent Israeli campaign of retaliation.

== See also ==
- Abu Nidal Organization (aka Fatah Revolutionary Council)
- Islamic Jihad Organization – similar organization in Lebanon led by Imad Mughniyeh, which orchestrated the 1983 Beirut barracks bombing and is thought to have been a cover organization for Hezbollah.
- Force 17 – Fatah's special operations unit, led by Ali Hassan Salameh and including Imad Mughniyeh.
- Palestinian Islamic Jihad
- Palestinian political violence
- Sabena Flight 571
- 15 May Organization

== Blibliography ==
- Bar Zohar, M., Haber E. The Quest for the Red Prince: Israel's Relentless Manhunt for One of the World's Deadliest and Most Wanted Arab Terrorists. The Lyons Press, 2002, ISBN 1-58574-739-4.
- Cooley, J. K.: Green March, Black September: The Story of the Palestinian Arabs. Frank Cass and Company Ltd., 1973, ISBN 0-7146-2987-1.
- Jonas, G. Vengeance. Bantam Books, 1985.
- Khalaf, S. (Abu Iyad). Stateless.
- Morris, B.: Righteous Victims: A History of the Zionist-Arab Conflict, 1881–2001. Vintage Books, 2001.
- Oudeh, M. D. (Abu Daoud). Memoirs of a Palestinian Terrorist.
