= Palestinian political violence =

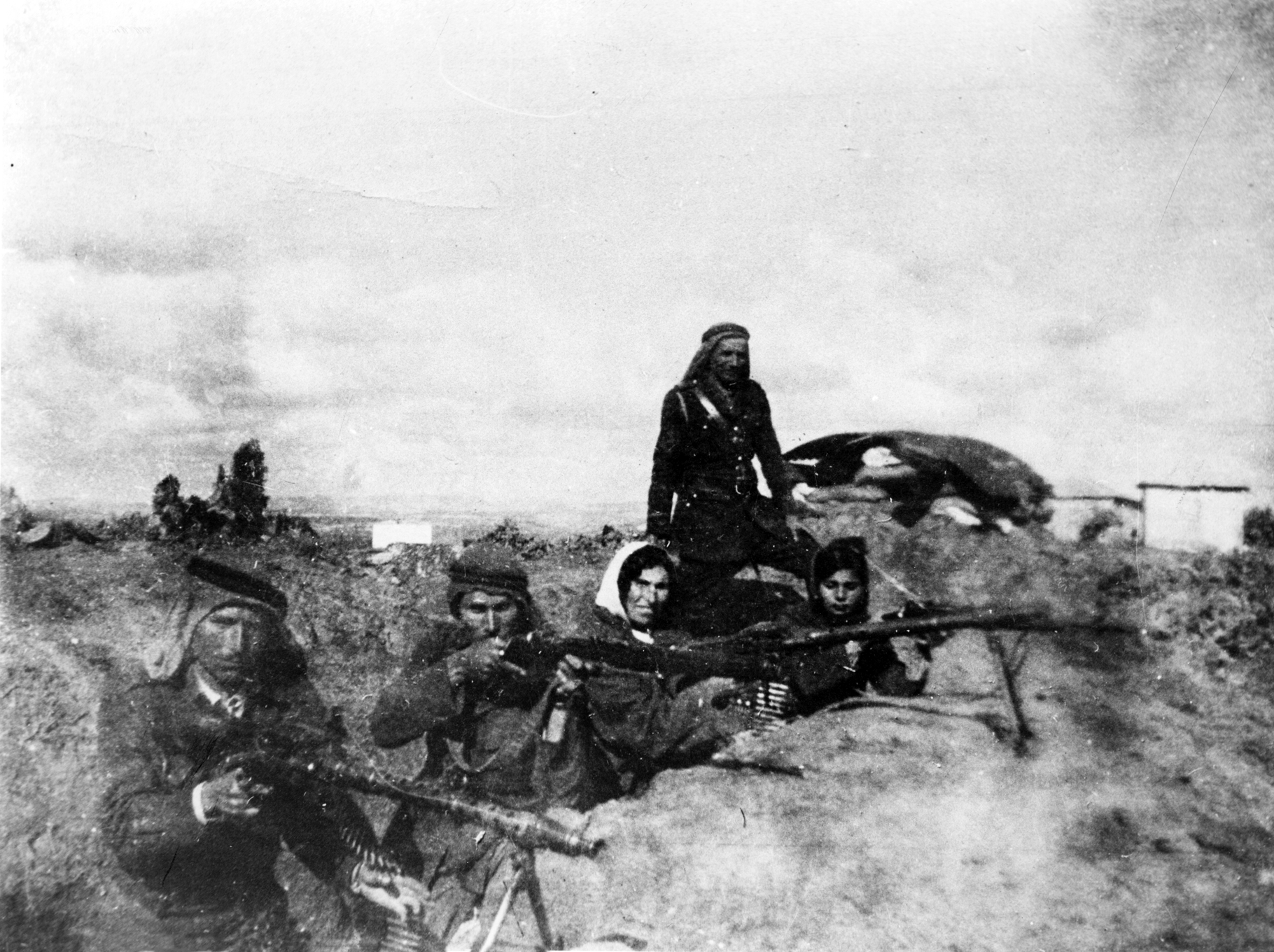
Palestinian insurgents fighting against British forces during the 1936–1939 Arab revolt in Palestine

Palestinian political violence encompasses acts of politically motivated violence carried out by Palestinian individuals and organisations, particularly in the context of the Israeli–Palestinian conflict. It has included guerrilla warfare, armed attacks on both military and civilian targets, suicide bombings, hijackings, hostage-taking, rocket attacks and other forms of violence such as stone-throwing.

The objectives and ideological motivations of Palestinian groups involved in political violence have varied across organisations and historical periods. Stated objectives have included Palestinian self-determination, the establishment of a Palestinian state, ending the Israeli occupation, and the return of Palestinian refugees. The Palestine Liberation Organization's 1968 charter explicitly advocated armed struggle to achieve Palestinian liberation, self-determination and return to Palestine. The release of Palestinian prisoners held by Israel has also been an objective of particular armed groups; in October 2023, Hamas and Palestinian Islamic Jihad demanded prisoner releases in exchange for releasing hostages.

Various prominent Palestinian armed groups have also advocated the destruction of Israel, while antisemitism has featured in the ideology of certain movements. Hamas's 1988 founding charter called for Israel's destruction and contained antisemitic rhetoric. Palestinian Islamic Jihad has likewise advocated Israel's destruction and the establishment of an Islamic state in historic Palestine. Hamas's 2017 policy document distinguished its opposition to Zionism from opposition to Jews as a people, but continued to reject recognition of Israel. By contrast, the Palestine Liberation Organization formally recognised Israel's right to exist in peace and security in 1993.

Palestinian groups that have been involved in politically motivated violence include the Palestine Liberation Organization (PLO), Fatah, the Popular Front for the Liberation of Palestine (PFLP), the Popular Front for the Liberation of Palestine – General Command (PFLP-GC), the Democratic Front for the Liberation of Palestine, the Abu Nidal Organization, the Palestinian Islamic Jihad, and Hamas. Several of these groups are considered terrorist organizations by the governments of the United States, Canada, the United Kingdom, Japan, New Zealand and the European Union.

Attacks have taken place both within Israel and Palestine as well as internationally. They have been directed at both military targets and civilians of many countries. Tactics have included hostage taking, plane hijacking, boat hijacking, stone throwing, improvised explosive device, knife attacks, shooting sprees, attacks with vehicles, car bombs and assassinations. In the 1990s, groups seeking to stop Israeli-Palestinian negotiations began adopting suicide bombings, predominantly targeting civilians, which later peaked during the Second Intifada. In recent decades, violence has also included rocket attacks on Israeli urban centers. The October 7 attacks resulted in massacres and hostage-taking.

Suicide bombings constituted 0.5% of Palestinian attacks against Israelis in the first two years of the Second Intifada, though this percentage accounted for half of the Israelis killed in that period. By 2026, a Palestinian minority of 27 percent supports armed struggle.

== History ==
=== Overview and context ===
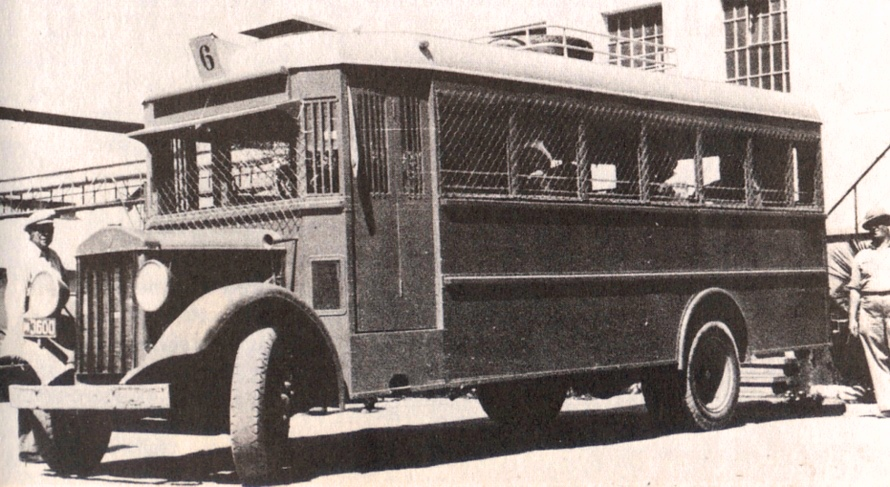
A Jewish bus equipped with wire screens to protect against rock, glass, and grenade throwing, late 1930s

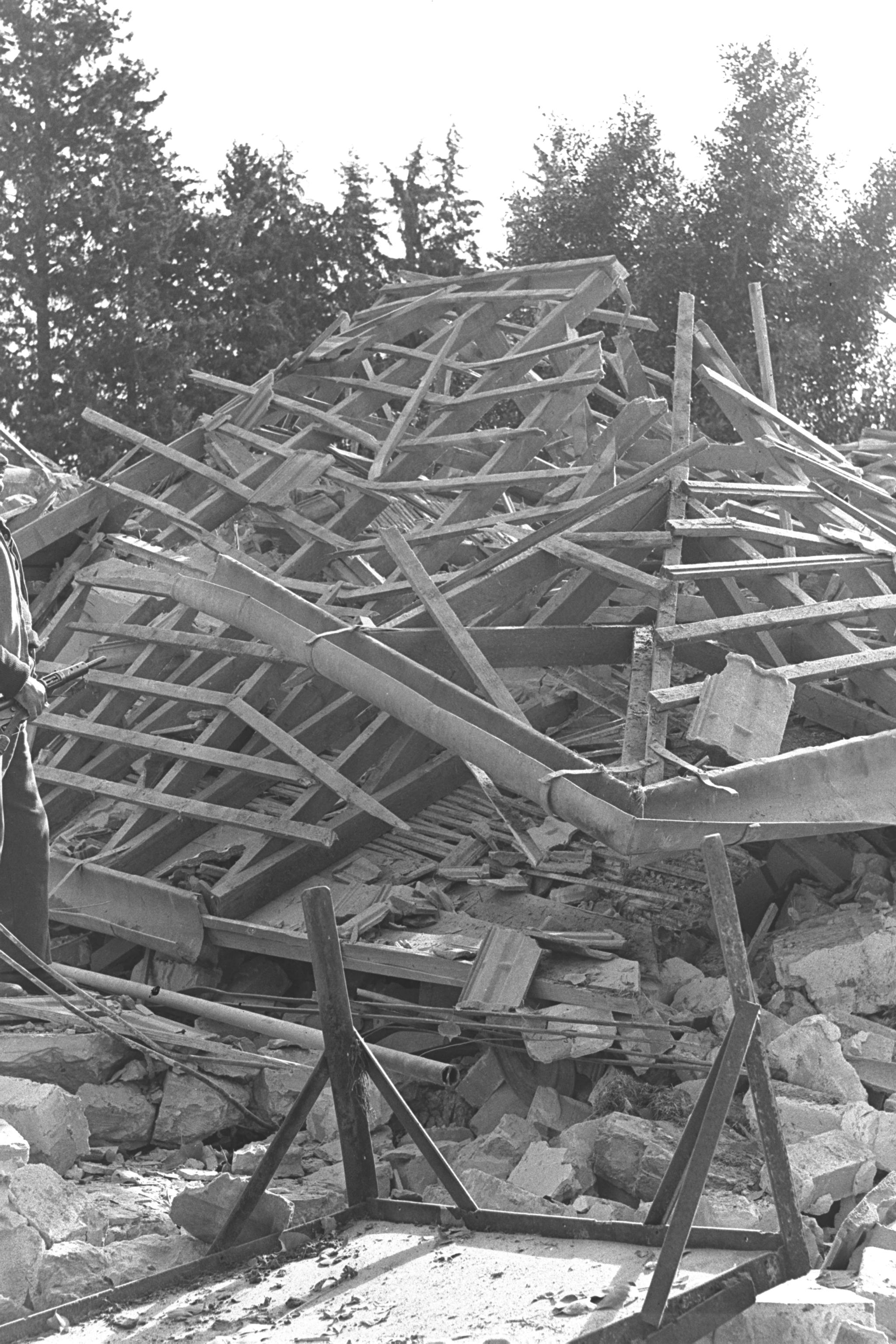
A demolished farmhouse in Tel Mond, Israel, after a fedayeen attack

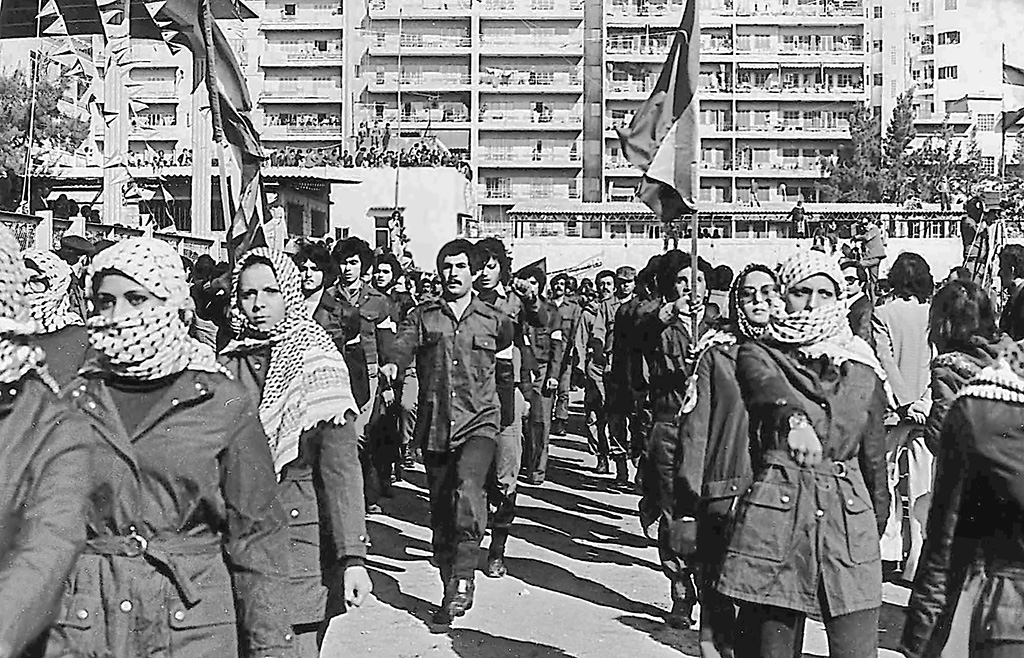
Palestinian fedayeen at a Fatah rally in Beirut, Lebanon in 1979

In protest against the 1917 Balfour Declaration, which proposed a national home for the Jewish people in Palestine, both Muslim and Christian Palestinians began to organize in opposition to Zionism. By the end of Ottoman rule, the Jewish population of Palestine was 56,000 or one-sixth of the total population. Hostility to Jewish immigration led to numerous incidents such as the 1920 Nebi Musa riots, the 1921 Jaffa riots, the 1929 Palestine riots and the 1936–39 Arab revolt in Palestine. The Arab revolt was suppressed by British security forces and led to the deaths of approximately 5,000 Palestinians. After the passing of the United Nations Partition Plan for Palestine in 1947 which called for the establishment of independent Arab and Jewish States, the 1947–48 Civil War in Mandatory Palestine broke out. Following the Israeli Declaration of Independence on May 15, 1948, the 1948 Arab–Israeli War began, involving intervention by neighboring Arab states. Casualties included 6,000 Israelis and, according to the 1958 survey by Arif al-Arif, 13,000 Palestinians. Additionally some 750,000 Palestinians were expelled or fled during the Nakba subsequently becoming refugees.

In the Six-Day War, a further 280,000–360,000 Palestinians became refugees, the West Bank including Jerusalem was captured and occupied from Jordan and Gaza was occupied from Egypt. These occupied Palestinian territories later began to be settled by Jewish and Israeli settlers, while the Palestinians were placed under Israeli military administration. Historically, Palestinian militancy was fragmented into several groups. The Palestine Liberation Organization led, and eventually united, most factions, while conducting military campaigns, varying from airplane hijackings, militant operations, and civil protest. In 1987, the First Intifada, a revolt of predominantly civil resistance, broke out. It led to the Madrid Conference of 1991, and subsequently to the Oslo I Accord. Oslo I produced an interim understanding allowing the new Palestinian National Authority to exercise limited autonomy in 3%, later 17%, of the West Bank, and parts of the Gaza Strip, which were not used or designated for Israeli settlement. Unsatisfied with concessions, Islamist organizations such as Hamas and Palestinian Islamic Jihad adopted the usage of suicide bombings, predominantly against Israeli civilians. Frustration over the perceived failure of the peace talks to yield a Palestinian state led to the outbreak of the Second Intifada from September 2000 until 2005, coincident with Israel's unilateral disengagement plan. The rise of Hamas, the use of Palestinian rocketry and Israel's control of Gaza's borders, has led to further chronic violence, culminating in a further two conflicts, the Gaza War of 2008–09 and Operation Pillar of Defense in 2012.

Since 1967, some reports estimate that some 40% of the male population of the West Bank and Gaza Strip have been arrested or detained in Israeli prisons for political or military reasons.

=== British Mandate for Palestine (1917–1947) ===
Following the Balfour Declaration in November 1917 which encouraged Jewish migrants to settle in Palestine, violence against the Jews increased in the region. At this time Arabs were the majority, both geographically and demographically compared to the Jewish population. The majority of Arab Palestinians were distributed throughout the highlands of Judea, Samaria and Galilee whereas the Jewish population was scattered in small towns and rural communities. Arabs hostile to the Jewish population adopted a "war of attrition" tactic which was advantageous to the more numerous Arab community.

Many of the deaths were inflicted during short time spans and in a few locations. On a day in April 1920, about 216 Jews were wounded or killed in Jerusalem. By May 1921, around 40 Jews were killed or wounded per day. In August 1929 that number had risen to 80 per day. During the 1929 riots, one percent of the Jewish population of Jerusalem were wounded or killed, in Safed 2 percent, and in Hebron 12 percent. During the 1920–1929 attacks on Jews were organized by local groups and encouraged by local religious leaders. As the Jewish community did not count on the British authorities to protect them, they formed the Haganah which were predominantly defensive in the 1920s. During the Arab Revolt in the 1936–1939 period, violence was coordinated and organized by the Grand Mufti of Jerusalem and was directed against both Jews and the British. Due to the rising level of Arab violence, the Haganah started to pursue an offensive strategy.

=== Independence of Israel to establishment of PLO (1949–1964) ===
Throughout the period 1949–56 the Egyptian government opposed the movement of refugees from the Gaza strip into Israel, but following the IDF's Gaza Raid on February 28, 1955, the Egyptian authorities facilitated militant infiltration but still continued to oppose civilian infiltration.

Around 400 Palestinian insurgents were killed by Israeli Security Forces each year in 1951, 1952 and 1953; a similar number and probably far more were killed in 1950. In 1949, 1,000 or more Palestinians were killed. At least 100 Palestinians were killed during 1954–1956. In total upward of 2,700 and possibly as many as 5,000 were killed by the IDF, police, and civilians along Israel's borders between 1949 and 1956. Most of the people in question were refugees attempting to return to their homes, take back possessions that had been left behind during the war and to gather crops from their former fields and orchards inside the new Israeli state. Meron Benivasti states that the fact that the "infiltrators" were for the most part former inhabitants of the land returning for personal, economic and sentimental reasons was suppressed in Israel as it was feared that this may lead to an understanding of their motives and to the justification of their actions.

After Israel's Operation Black Arrow in 1955, in response to massacres in the city of Rehovot, the Palestinian fedayeen were incorporated into an Egyptian unit. John Bagot Glubb, a British general who commanded the Arab Legion, claimed in his 1957 autobiography A Soldier with the Arabs that he convinced the Legion to arm and train the fedayeen for free. Between 1951 and 1956, 400 Israelis were killed and 900 wounded by fedayeen attacks.

The Palestine Liberation Organization was founded in 1964. At its first convention in Cairo, hundreds of Palestinians met to "call for the right of self-determination and the upholding of the rights of the Palestinian nation". To achieve these goals, a Palestinian army of liberation was thought to be essential; thus, the Palestinian Liberation Army was established with the support of the Arab states. Fatah, a Palestinian group founded in the late 1950s to organize the armed resistance against Israel, and headed by Yasser Arafat, soon rose to prominence within the PLO. The PLO charter called for "an end to the State of Israel, a return of Palestinians to their homeland, and the establishment of a single democratic state throughout Palestine".

=== Six-Day War and aftermath ===
Our basic aim is to liberate the land from the Mediterranean Seas to the Jordan River. We are not concerned with what took place in June 1967 or in eliminating the consequences of the June War. The Palestinian revolution's basic concern is the uprooting of the Zionist entity from our land and liberating it.

— Yasser Arafat, 1970

Due to Israel's defeat of Arab armies in the Six-Day War, the Palestinian leadership came to the conclusion that the Arab world was unable to challenge Israel militarily in open warfare. Simultaneously, the Palestinians drew lessons from movements and uprisings in Latin America, North Africa and Southeast Asia which led them to move away from guerilla warfare in rural areas and towards terrorist attacks in urban environments with an international reach. This led to a series of aircraft hijackings, bombings and kidnappings which culminated in the killings of Israeli athletes during the 1972 Munich Olympic Games. The military superiority of Israel led Palestinian fighters to employ guerrilla tactics from bases in Jordan and Lebanon.

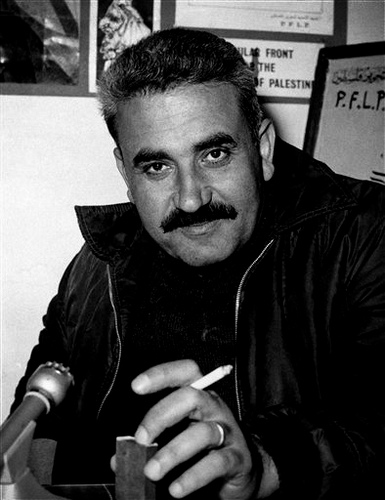
George Habash, founder of the PFLP, masterminded the hijackings of four Western airliners to Jordan, which led to the Black September conflict.

In the wake of the Six-Day War, confrontations between Palestinian guerrillas in Jordan and government forces became a major problem within the kingdom. By early 1970, at least seven Palestinian guerrilla organizations were active in Jordan, one of the most important being the Popular Front for the Liberation of Palestine (PFLP) led by George Habash. Based in the Jordanian refugee camps, the fedayeen developed a virtual state within a state, receiving funds and arms from both the Arab states and Eastern Europe and openly flouting the law of the country. The guerrillas initially focused on attacking Israel, but by late 1968, the main fedayeen activities in Jordan appeared to shift to attempts to overthrow the Jordanian monarchy.

=== Black September ===
Various clashes between the fedayeen and the army occurred between the years 1968–1970. The situation climaxed in September 1970, when several attempts to assassinate King Hussein failed. On September 7, 1970, in the series of Dawson's Field hijackings, three planes were hijacked by PFLP: a SwissAir and a TWA that were landed in Azraq area and a Pan Am that was landed in Cairo. Then on September 9, a BOAC flight from Bahrain was also hijacked to Zarqa. The PFLP announced that the hijackings were intended "to pay special attention to the Palestinian problem". After all hostages were removed, the planes were dramatically blown up in front of TV cameras.

A bitterly fought 10-day civil war known as Black September ensued, drawing involvement by Syria and Iraq, and sparking troop movements by Israel and the United States Navy. The number of people killed on all sides were estimated as high as 3,500, other sources claiming it to be as high as 20,000.

Battles between Palestinian guerrilla forces and the Jordanian army continued during the closing months of 1970 and the first six months of 1971. In November 1971, members of the Palestinian Black September group, who took their name from the civil war, assassinated Jordanian Prime Minister Wasfi al-Tal in Cairo. In December the group made an unsuccessful attempt to assassinate the Jordanian ambassador in Britain.

=== Relocation to Lebanon and Lebanese Civil War ===
In the aftermath of Black September in Jordan, many Palestinians arrived in Lebanon, among them Yasser Arafat and the Palestinian Liberation Organization (PLO). In the early 1970s their presence exacerbated an already tense situation in Lebanon, and in 1975 the Lebanese Civil War broke out. Beginning with street fighting in Beirut between Christian Phalangists and Palestinian militiamen, the war quickly deteriorated into a conflict between two loosely defined factions: the side wishing to preserve the status quo, consisting primarily of Maronite militias, and the side seeking change, which included a variety of militias from leftist organizations and guerrillas from rejectionist Palestinian (nonmainstream PLO) organizations. The Lebanese civil war lasted until 1990 and resulted in an estimated 130,000 to 250,000 civilian fatalities and one million wounded.

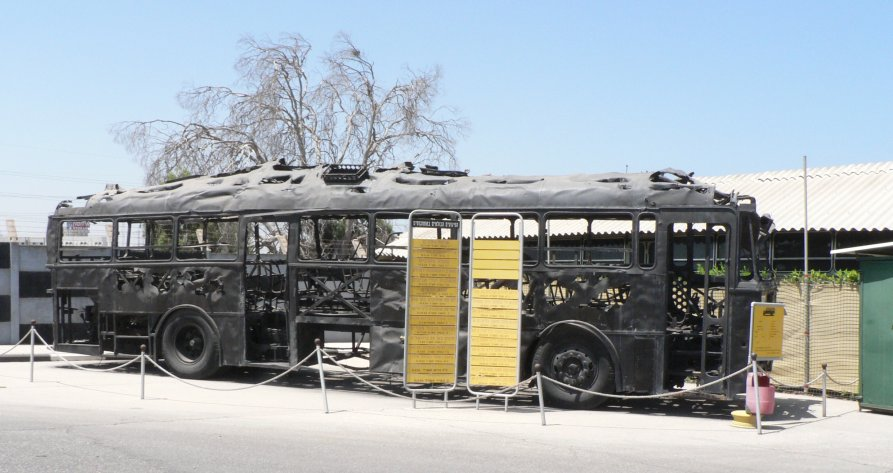
Charred remains of the bus hijacked and burnt by Palestinian militants in 1978 in the Coastal Road massacre

After Black September, the PLO and its offshoots waged an international campaign against Israelis. Notable events were the Munich Olympics massacre (1972), the hijacking of several civilian airliners (some were thwarted, see for example: Entebbe Operation), the Savoy Hotel attack, the Zion Square explosive refrigerator and the Coastal Road massacre. During the 1970s and the early 1980s, Israel suffered attacks from PLO bases in Lebanon, such as the Avivim school bus massacre in 1970, the Maalot massacre in 1974 (where Palestinian militants massacred 21 school children) and the Nahariya attack led by Samir Kuntar in 1979, as well as a terrorist bombing by Ziad Abu Ein that killed two Israeli 16-year-olds and left 36 other youths wounded during the Lag BaOmer celebration in Tiberias. Following the 1982 Israeli invasion of Lebanon, called "Operation Peace for Galilee" by the IDF, and the exile of the PLO to Tunis, Israel had a relatively quiet decade.

=== First Intifada (1987–1993) ===
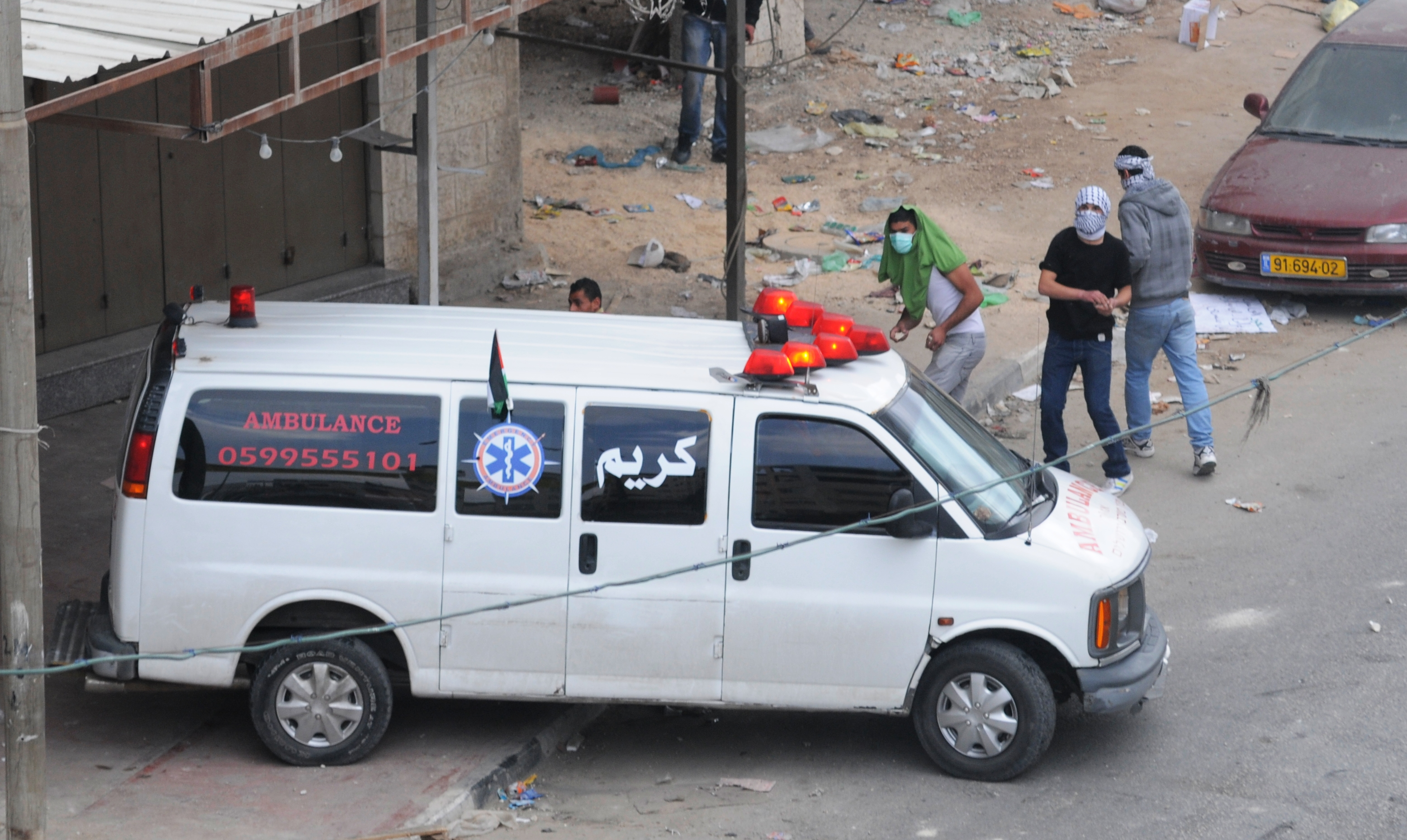
Palestinians in Qalandiya throw rocks from behind an ambulance during a riot as part of the Nakba protests.

The First Intifada was characterized more by grassroots and non-violent political actions from among the population in the Israeli occupied Palestinian territories. A total of 160 Israelis and 2,162 Palestinians were killed, including 1,000 Palestinians killed by other Palestinians under the accusation of being collaborators. The Intifada lasted five years and ended with the signing of the Oslo Accords. The strategy of non-violence, though widespread among Palestinians, was not always adhered to, and there were youth who threw molotov cocktails and stones, with such violence generally directed against Israeli soldiers and settlers.

There were two attacks that represented new developments in terms of political violence inside Israel in this period. The first Palestinian suicide attack took place on July 6, 1989, when a member of the Palestinian Islamic Jihad boarded the Tel Aviv Jerusalem bus 405. He walked up to the driver and pulled the wheel to the right, driving the vehicle into a ravine, killing 16 people. The end of the intifada also saw the first use of suicide bombing as a tactic by Palestinian militants. On April 16, 1993, Hamas carried out the Mehola Junction bombing, in which operative Saher Tamam al-Nabulsi detonated his explosives-laden car between two buses. One person, a Palestinian, other than the attacker was killed, and 21 were wounded.

During this period, the Abu Nidal Organization became subsumed by infighting and mass executed hundreds of its members and their families during 1987–1988. The number of executed is estimated at 600 people, mostly Palestinians, across several separate locations in Syria, Lebanon and Libya.

=== Oslo Accords to Camp David Summit (1993–2000) ===
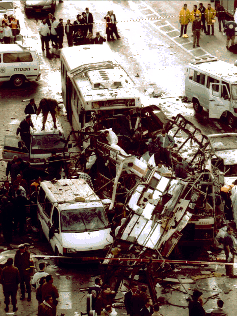
Bus after 1996 terror bombing in Jerusalem

The years between the intifadas were marked by intense diplomatic activity between Israel and Palestinians, who were represented by the PLO. This led to the signing of the Oslo Accords and the creation of the Palestinian National Authority. In response, Islamist organizations such as Hamas and the Palestinian Islamic Jihad (PIJ) adopted the tactic of suicide bombings, influenced by Lebanese groups, to derail the peace process, weaken the PLO and polarize Israeli politics.

In this period, suicide bombings of Israeli buses and crowded spaces became a regular tactic, particularly by Hamas and Islamic Jihad. Attacks during this period include the Beit Lid massacre, a double-suicide bombing at a crowded junction that killed 21 people and the Dizengoff Center massacre, a suicide bombing outside a Tel Aviv shopping mall that killed 13 people.

=== Second Intifada (2000–2005) ===
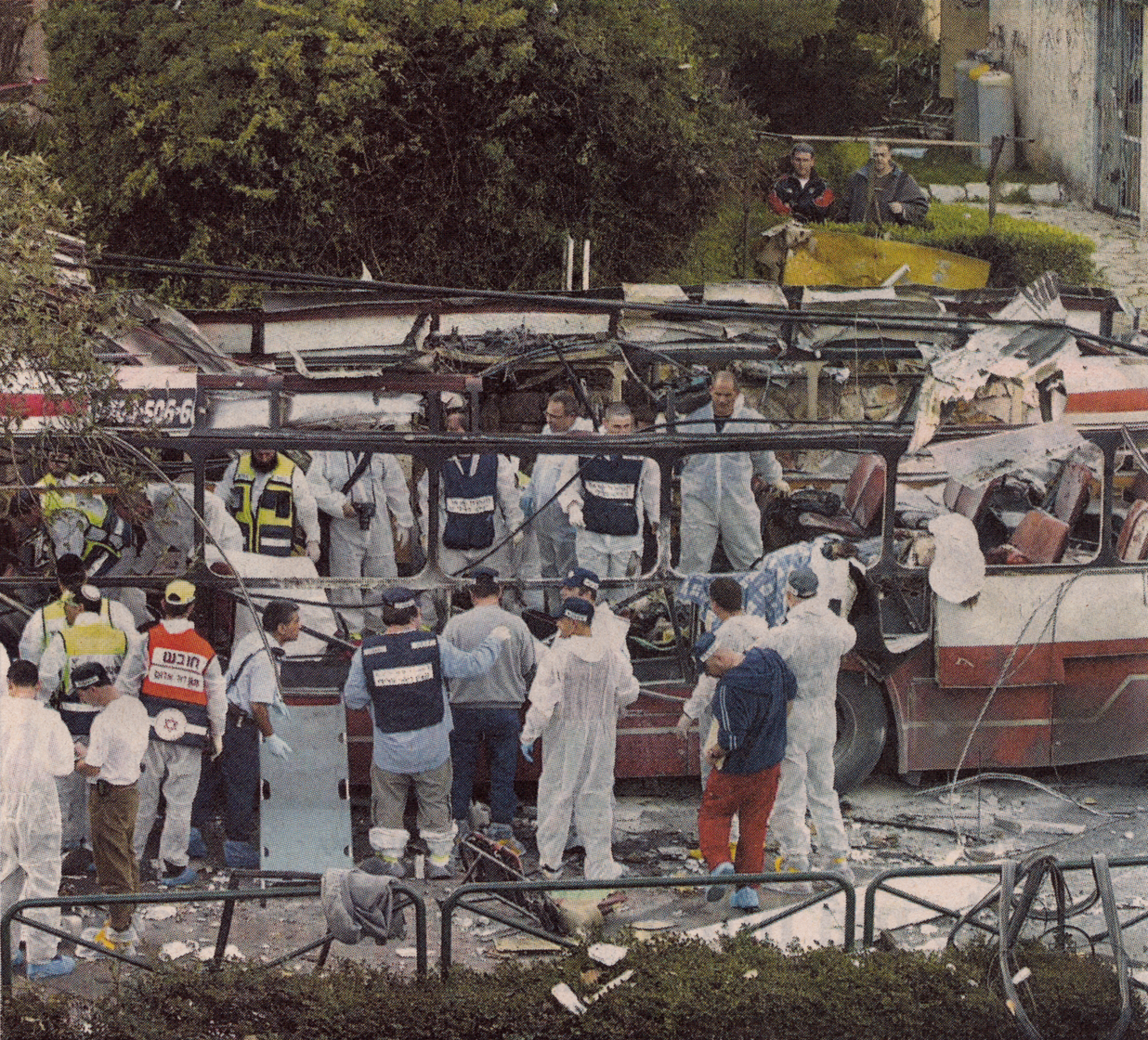
Bus after 2003 terror bombing in Haifa

The Second Intifada (2000–2005) witnessed a significant increase in Palestinian political violence, including many suicide bombings, which predominantly targeted Israeli civilians. According to B'Tselem, as of July 10, 2005, over 400 members of the Israeli Security forces, and 821 Israeli civilians have been killed by Palestinians since the signing of the Oslo Accords in 1993, 553 of whom were killed within the 1949 Armistice lines, mainly by suicide bombings. Targets of attacks included buses, Israeli checkpoint, restaurants, discothèques, shopping malls, a university, and civilian homes.

==== Ramallah lynching ====
In October 2000, a Palestinian mob lynched two non-combatant Israel Defense Forces reservists, Vadim Nurzhitz (sometimes spelled as Norzhich) and Yossi Avrahami (or Yosef Avrahami), who had accidentally entered the Palestinian Authority-controlled city of Ramallah in the West Bank. The brutality of the event, captured in a photo of a Palestinian rioter proudly waving his blood-stained hands to the crowd below, sparked international outrage and further intensified the ongoing conflict between Israeli and Palestinian forces.

==== Suicide bombings and attacks on civilians ====
A spate of suicide bombings and attacks, aimed mostly at civilians (such as the Dolphinarium discotheque suicide bombing), was launched against Israel and elicited a military response. A suicide bombing dubbed the Passover Massacre (30 Israeli civilians were killed at Park hotel, Netanya) climaxed a bloody month of March 2002, in which more than 130 Israelis, mostly civilians, were killed in attacks. Israel launched Operation Defensive Shield. The operation led to the apprehension of many members of militant groups, as well as their weaponry and equipment. 497 Palestinians and 30 Israelis were killed during Operation Defensive Shield.

In the 2004 Sinai bombings, 31 people were killed and 159 others were wounded in a simultaneous attack against multiple tourist destinations in Egypt. Of the dead, 15 were Egyptians, 12 were from Israel, two from Italy, one from Russia, and one was an Israeli-American. According to the Egyptian government, the bombers were Palestinians led by Iyad Saleh, who had tried to enter Israel to carry out attacks there but were unsuccessful.

=== 2005–2013 ===
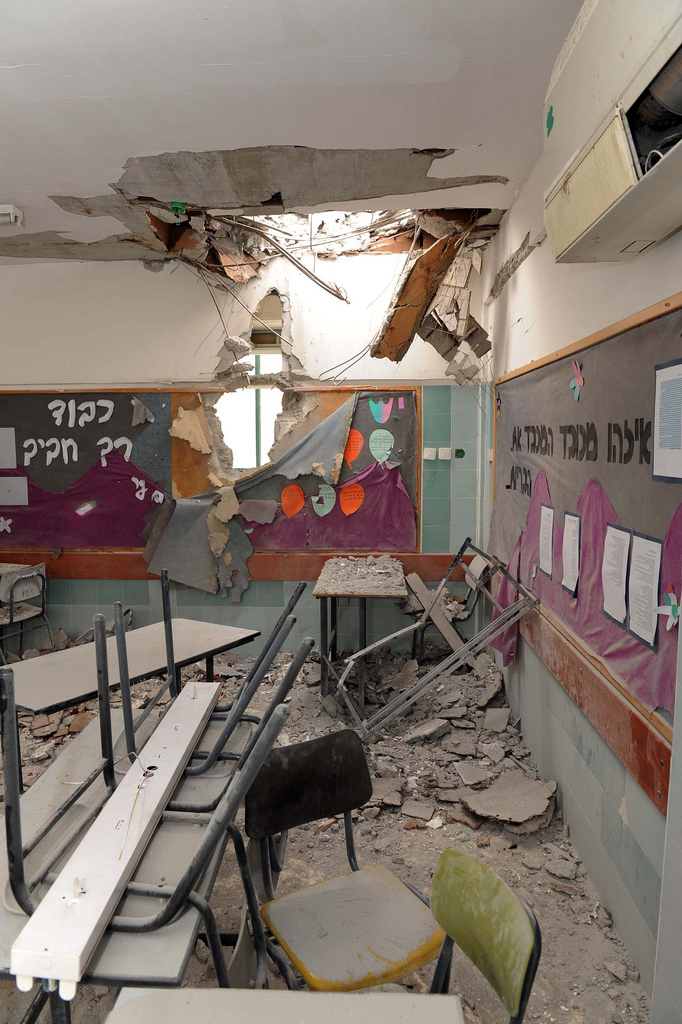
A kindergarten classroom in the Israeli city of Beer Sheva after being hit by a Grad rocket fired from the Gaza Strip

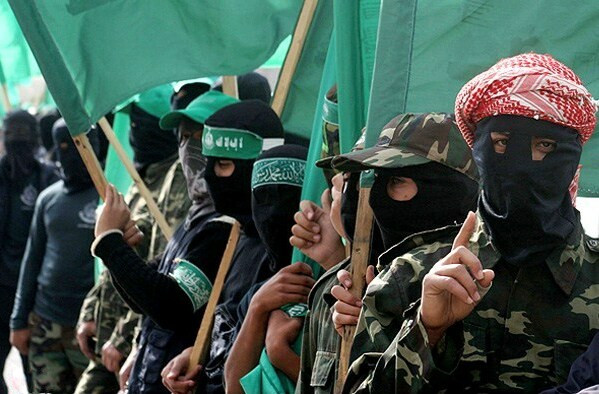
Hamas' military wing, the Al-Qassam Brigades, on parade in 2011

In the mid-2000s, Hamas started putting greater emphasis on its political characteristics and strengthened its popularity amongst Palestinians. In 2006 Palestinian legislative elections Hamas won a majority in the Palestinian Legislative Council, prompting the United States and many European countries to cut off all funds to Hamas and the Palestinian Authority, insisting that Hamas must recognize Israel, renounce violence and accept previous peace pacts.

After the Israel's unilateral disengagement plan in 2005 and the 2006 Palestinian legislative elections, Hamas took control over all the Gaza Strip in June 2007 in a bloody coup. Palestinian militant groups in the Gaza strip increased the firing of Qassam rockets, mortars and Grad missiles on southern Israel. Attacks continued outside the Gaza Strip perimeter, including the attack that resulted in the Israeli soldier Gilad Shalit being captured and held in the Gaza Strip for over five years.

Hamas has made use of guerrilla tactics in the Gaza Strip and to a lesser degree the West Bank. Hamas has adapted these techniques over the years since its inception. According to a 2006 report by rival Fatah party, Hamas had smuggled "between several hundred and 1,300 tons" of advanced rockets, along with other weaponry, into Gaza. Some Israelis and some Gazans both noted similarities in Hamas's military buildup to that of Hezbollah in the 2006 Israel-Hezbollah war.

Hamas has used IEDs and anti-tank rockets against the IDF in Gaza. The latter include standard RPG-7 warheads and home-made rockets such as the Al-Bana, Al-Batar and Al-Yasin. The IDF has a difficult, if not impossible time trying to find hidden weapons caches in Palestinian areas – this is due to the high local support base Hamas enjoys.

During the Gaza War (2008–2009), Palestinian militant groups fired rockets aimed at civilian targets which struck the cities of Ashdod, Beersheba and Gedera. The military wing of Hamas said that after a week from the start, it had managed to fire 302 rockets, at an average of 44 rockets daily. 102 rockets and 35 mortars were fired by Fatah at Israel. Over 750 rockets and mortars were fired from Gaza into Israel during the conflict wounded 182 civilians, killing 3 people, and causing minor suffering to another 584 people suffering from shock and anxiety. Several rockets landed in schools and one fell close to a kindergarten, all located in residential areas. The UN fact finding mission stated that this constituted a deliberate attack against the civilian population and was unjustifiable in international law.

In 2012, terror attacks against Israelis in the West Bank increased compared to 2011. The number of terror attacks in the West Bank increased from 320 in 2011 to 578 in 2012. The attacks mainly involved rock throwing, Molotov cocktails, firearms and explosives.

In 2013, Hamas stated that the "kidnapping of IDF soldiers to trade for Palestinian prisoners is at the heart of Palestinian culture".

=== Israel–Gaza war ===
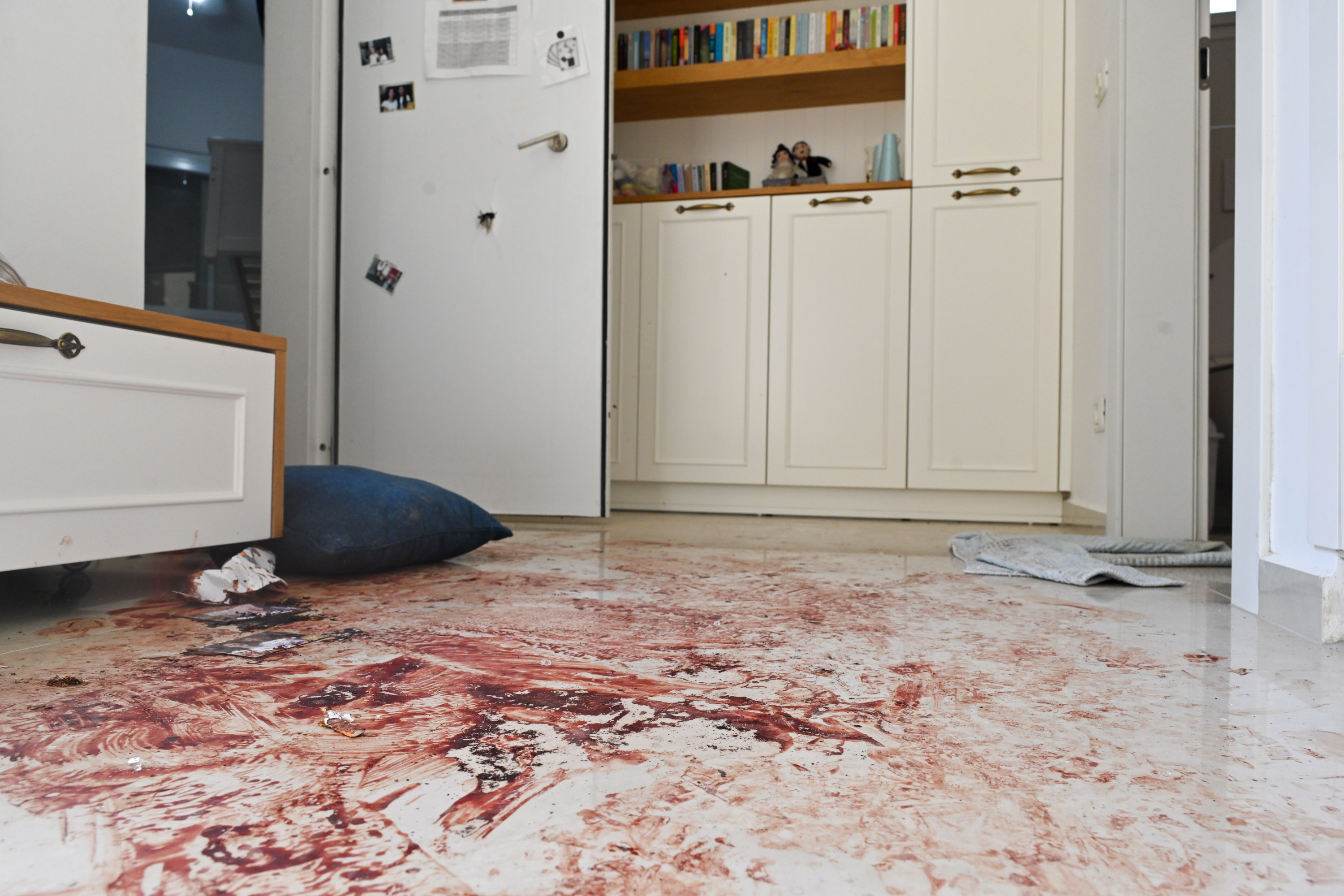
A blood-stained home floor in the aftermath of the Nahal Oz massacre

On October 7, 2023, Hamas and other Palestinian factions launched an attack, breaching the Gaza–Israel barrier. For months prior to the attack, Hamas had been leading Israeli intelligence to believe that they were not seeking conflict. Hamas fighters proceeded to massacre hundreds of civilians at a music festival and in kibbutz Be'eri and take hostages in Southern Israel back to the Gaza Strip. In total, 1,139 civilians, IDF soldiers and foreign nationals were killed in Israel, making this the deadliest attack by Hamas militants since the foundation of Israel in 1948. The Hamas-led attack marked the beginning of the ongoing Gaza war.

== Government involvement ==
In 2011, Israeli PM Benyamin Netanyahu stated that the incitement promulgated by the Palestinian Authority was destroying Israel's confidence, and he condemned what he regarded as the glorification of the murderers of the Fogel family in Itamar on PA television. The perpetrator of the murders had been described as a "hero" and a "legend" by members of his family, during a weekly program.

Isi Leibler wrote in the Jerusalem Post that Mahmoud Abbas and his chief negotiator Saeb Erekat deny Israel's right to exist and promote vicious hatred against Jews, in statements made in Arabic. He claimed that the state-controlled Palestinian media praised the murders committed by Palestinians. Abbas al-Sayed who perpetrated the Passover suicide attack at the Park Hotel in Netanya which killed 30 civilians was described by Abbas as a "hero" and "symbol of the Palestinian Authority".

Following the Itamar massacre and a bombing in Jerusalem, 27 US senators sent a letter requesting the US Secretary of State to identify the administration's steps to end Palestinian incitement to violence against Jews and Israel that they said was occurring within the "Palestinian media, mosques and schools, and even by individuals or institutions affiliated with the Palestinian Authority".

The United Nations body UNESCO stopped funding a children's magazine sponsored by the Palestinian Authority that commended Hitler's killing of Jews. It deplored this publication as contrary to its principles of building tolerance and respect for human rights and human dignity.

Palestinian Media Watch reported that the Palestinian Authority spent more than $5 million a month paying salaries to Palestinians and Israeli Arabs imprisoned in Israel for terror crimes. They also stated that groups in a summer camp for children sponsored by PA Prime Minister Salam Fayyad were named after militants: Dalal Mughrabi, who led the Coastal Road Massacre; Salah Khalaf, head of Black September that carried out the Munich massacre; and Abu Ali Mustafa, the general secretary of the Popular Front for the Liberation of Palestine who perpetrated many attacks. Saddam Hussein, the leader of Iraq, donated $25,000 to the families of suicide bombers, and $10,000 to the families of Palestinian civilians killed by the Israeli military.

After Israel agreed to hand over the bodies of dead Palestinian suicide bombers and other militants as part of what the Israeli Government described as 'a humanitarian gesture' to PA chairman Mahmoud Abbas to help the peace process, the Palestinian Authority planned a national rally to honour them and to provide full military funerals. The bodies included the suicide bombers that perpetrated the bus bombing in Jerusalem's Shmuel Hanavi neighborhood which killed twenty-three people, many of them children, and the attacker in the Cafe Hillel bombing. Israel will also return the remains of the bombers that committed the bombings on two buses in Beersheba in 2004 killing 16 people, the Stage night club bombing, the attack on the open-air Hadera market as well as the attackers of the Savoy Hotel in Tel Aviv who killed eight hostages. The Palestinian Authority and Hamas both planned official ceremonies and PA president Abbas attended a ceremony at his Muqataa compound. Prisoners Affairs Minister Qaraqi called on Palestinians for a day of celebration. The rally in honor of the dead will be attended by PA President Mahmoud Abbas, PLO leaders, and families of the dead militants. The dead are considered martyrs by Palestinians, but viewed as terrorists by Israelis.

Palestinian President Mahmoud Abbas has been accused of incitement to violence, on the basis of a statement he made concerning youths injured in defending the Haram al Sharif/Temple Mount from what Palestinians have seen as attempts to alter the status quo. He declared in September 2015: "Every drop of blood spilled in Jerusalem is pure, every shahid will reach paradise, and every injured person will be rewarded by God."

== Involvement of women and children ==
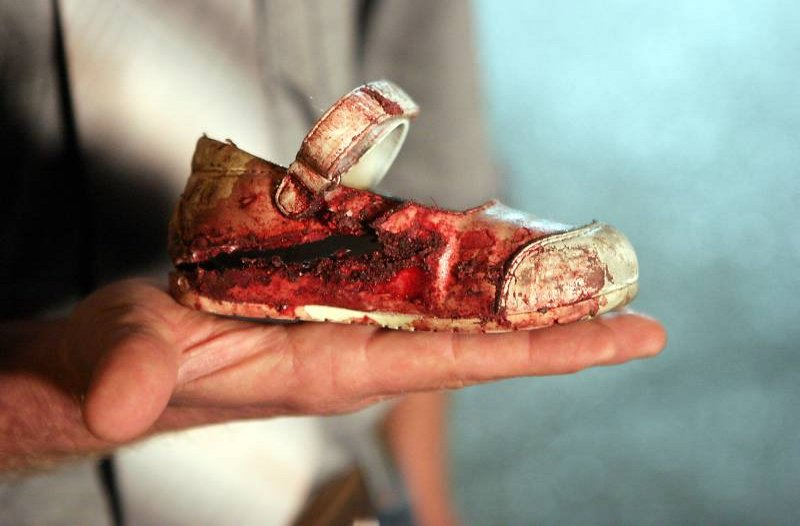
Bloody child's shoe after Palestinian attack on an Israeli shopping mall

In the 1930s, the emergence of organized youth cadres was rooted in the desire to form a youth paramilitary. It was believed that armed youth might bring an end to British hegemony in the Middle East. Youth were cajoled into violence by Palestinian political figures and newspapers that glorified violence and death. The Palestinian Arab Party sponsored the development of storm troops consisting solely of children and youth. A British report from the period stated that "the growing youth and scout movements must be regarded as the most probable factors for the disturbance of the peace".

As a youngster, Yasir Arafat led neighborhood children in marching and drills, beating those who did not obey. In the 1940s, Arafat's father organized a group of militants in Gaza which included Yasir Arafat and his brothers. The leader, Abu Khalid, a mathematics teacher in Gaza, gave Arafat the name Yasir in honor of the militant Yasir al-Bireh.

=== Child suicide bombers ===
As part of the Arab–Israeli conflict, especially during the Second Intifada from 2000 to 2005, Palestinian militant groups used children for suicide bombings. Minors were recruited to attack Israeli targets, both military and civilian. This deliberate involvement of children in armed conflict was condemned by international human rights organizations.

According to Amnesty International: "Palestinian armed groups have repeatedly shown total disregard for the most fundamental human rights, notably the right to life, by deliberately targeting Israeli civilians and by using Palestinian children in armed attacks. Children are susceptible to recruitment by manipulation or may be driven to join armed groups for a variety of reasons, including a desire to avenge relatives or friends killed by the Israeli army."

=== Human shields ===
According to the United Nations Secretary-General Ban Ki-moon in 2015, Hamas launched rockets from inside schools to use the retaliatory child deaths for propaganda and deter Israel from attacking Gaza. This tactic is called the human shield.

=== Involvement of women ===
Women in particular have increasingly associated political violence with expanded citizenship rights due to the perceived failure of nonmilitaristic tactics to achieve political goals, primary amongst these, the achievement of Palestinian autonomy.

The profile of the female Palestinian suicide bombers has been the subject of study by Katherine VanderKaay, who presented her profiling of the subjects at the American Psychological Association's annual meeting. While the first suicide bombing undertaken by a Palestinian took place in 1994, the first female suicide bomber from among Palestinian society did not emerge until January 2002. The bomber was Wafa Idris, a 28-year-old paramedic and a supporter of secularist parties.

== Violence against civilians ==
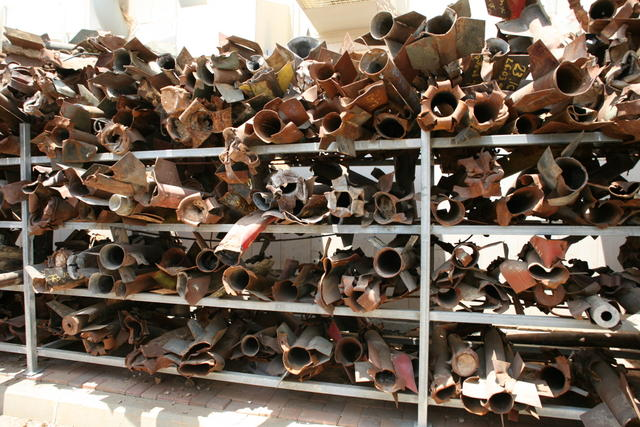
Qassam rockets fired at Sderot

Timeline of Israelis and Palestinians killed in the occupied Palestinian territory and Israel from 2008 to October 6, 2023

According to Israeli human rights organization B'Tselem, 500 Israeli civilians were killed by Palestinians from September 29, 2000, to March 31, 2012, in Israel, and another 254 Israeli civilians were killed in the Gaza Strip and the West Bank.

B'Tselem stated that the primary justification used by Palestinian organizations to justify violence against civilians is that "all means are legitimate in fighting for independence against a foreign occupation", but rejected this rationale as "completely baseless", noting that international humanitarian law strictly requires combatants to distinguish between civilians and military targets.

B'Tselem also noted that Palestinian spokespersons assert that Israeli settlers in the Occupied Territories lack civilian protection under international law due to the illegality of settlements and their involvement in Israel's security forces. B'Tselem responded that the illegality of settlements does not alter the civilian status of their residents under international law, and that settlers, "a distinctly civilian population," remain protected from targeted attacks. B'Tselem said it "strongly opposes the attempts to justify attacks against Israeli civilians by using distorted interpretations of international law" and "demands that the Palestinian Authority do everything within its power to prevent future attacks and to prosecute the individuals involved in past attacks."

=== Rocket attacks on Israel ===
Rocket attacks fired at Israel from the Gaza Strip, 2001–2021

Palestinian rocket and mortar attacks on Israel from the Gaza Strip have occurred since 2001. Between 2001 and January 2009, over 8,600 rockets had been launched, leading to 28 deaths and several hundred injuries, as well as widespread psychological trauma and disruption of daily life.

The weapons, often generically referred to as Qassams, were initially crude and short-range, mainly affecting the Israeli city of Sderot and other communities bordering the Gaza Strip. In 2006, more sophisticated rockets began to be deployed, reaching the larger coastal city of Ashkelon, and by early 2009 major cities Ashdod and Beersheba had been hit by Katyusha and Grad rockets.

Attacks have been carried out by all Palestinian armed groups, and, prior to the 2008–2009 Gaza War, were consistently supported by most Palestinians, although the stated goals have been mixed. The attacks, widely condemned for targeting civilians, have been described as terrorism by United Nations, European Union and Israeli officials, and are defined as war crimes by human rights groups Amnesty International and Human Rights Watch.

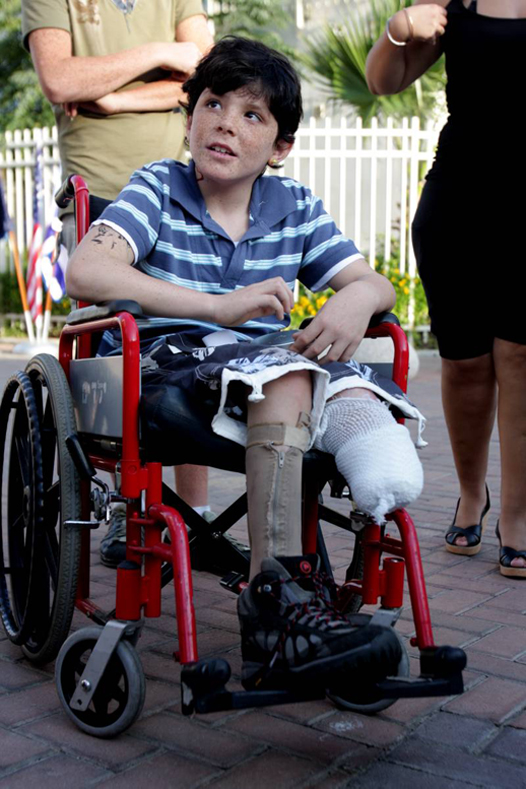
Osher Twito, an Israeli boy crippled by Palestinian rocket fire

Defenses constructed specifically to deal with the weapons include fortifications for schools and bus stops as well as an alarm system named Red Color. Iron Dome, a system to intercept short-range rockets, was developed by Israel and first deployed in the spring of 2011 to protect Beersheba and Ashkelon, but officials and experts warned that it would not be completely effective. Shortly thereafter, it intercepted a Palestinian Grad rocket for the first time.

The attacks were a stated cause of the Gaza blockade, the Gaza War (December 27, 2008 – January 21, 2009) and other Israeli military operations in the Gaza Strip, including Operation Rainbow (May 2004), Operation Days of Penitence (2004), the 2006 Gaza–Israel conflict, Operation Autumn Clouds (2006), and Operation Hot Winter (2008). Attacks began in 2001. Since then, nearly 4,800 rockets have hit southern Israel, just over 4,000 of them since Israel withdrew from the Gaza Strip in August 2005. The range of the rockets has increased over time. The original Qassam rocket has a range of about 10 km (6.2 mi) but more advanced rockets, including versions of the old Soviet Grad or Katyusha have hit Israeli targets 40 km (25 mi) from Gaza.

Some analysts see the attacks as a shift away from reliance on suicide bombing, which was previously Hamas's main method of attacking Israel, and an adoption of the rocket tactics used by Lebanese militant group Hezbollah.

=== Stone-throwing ===
Palestinian stone-throwing is a violent political statement which encompasses the practice of throwing stones by hand and using powerful slings variously aimed at Israel security personnel, Israeli civilians, and at both civilian and military vehicles.

== Internal violence ==
B'Tselem reports that from September 29, 2000, to March 31, 2012, there were 669 Palestinians killed by Palestinians. Of those, 134 were killed for suspected collaboration with Israel.

Concerning the killing of Palestinians by other Palestinians, a January 2003 Humanist magazine article reports:

For over a decade the PA has violated Palestinian human rights and civil liberties by routinely killing civilians—including collaborators, demonstrators, journalists, and others—without charge or fair trial. Of the total number of Palestinian civilians killed during this period by both Israeli and Palestinian security forces, 16 percent were the victims of Palestinian security forces.

... According to Freedom House's annual survey of political rights and civil liberties, Freedom in the World 2001–2002, the chaotic nature of the Intifada along with strong Israeli reprisals has resulted in a deterioration of living conditions for Palestinians in Israeli-administered areas. The survey states:

"Civil liberties declined due to: shooting deaths of Palestinian civilians by Palestinian security personnel; the summary trial and executions of alleged collaborators by the Palestinian Authority (PA); extrajudicial killings of suspected collaborators by militias; and the apparent official encouragement of Palestinian youth to confront Israeli soldiers, thus placing them directly in harm's way."

Internal Palestinian violence has been called an Intrafada, a play on "intifada".

== Palestinian attitudes ==
=== 1980s ===
The PLO officially "declared its rejection and condemnation of terrorism in all its forms" in 1988.

=== 1995–2000 ===
A study conducted by Mkhaimer Abusada of Al-Azhar University explored attitudes towards the use of political violence. Four questions were posed on the subject of political violence to over a thousand respondents randomly selected from localities in the West Bank and Gaza Strip. The first question was: "Do you support the continuing resort of some Palestinian factions to armed operations against Israeli targets in Gaza and Jericho?" Overall, 56% of respondents responded negatively. Those affiliated with leftist groups showed the highest levels of support for armed attacks against Israelis (74%), while those affiliated with parties supporting the peace process showed the lowest levels (24%). The Islamic opposition was split, with slightly over half in favor, and slightly less than half opposed.

In September 1995, survey participants were asked whether they supported, opposed or had no opinion with regard to "armed attacks against Israeli army targets", "armed attacks against Israeli settlers", and "armed attacks against Israeli civilian targets". The majority supported the use of armed attacks against Israeli military targets and settlers in the West Bank and Gaza Strip. Support crossed all party lines and groups, and was highest among the Islamic opposition (91% and 84%) and the leftists (90% and 89%), though a significant majority of those who supported the peace process also supported armed attacks on military targets and settlers (69% and 73%). To explain the apparent paradox in the latter position, Abusada quotes Shikaki (1996) who "contends that Palestinian support for the use of armed attacks against Israeli military targets and settlers does not indicate 'opposition to the peace process but Palestinian insistence that the process entails an end to occupation and settlements.'" Palestinian support for armed attacks against Israeli civilian targets in Israel was 20% overall, with support being highest among those affiliated with the Islamic opposition (42%) and the leftists (32%), and lowest among supporters of the peace process (12%) and the National Independents (10%).

=== 2000–04 ===
A July 2001 poll conducted by the Palestinian Center for Policy & Survey Research (PSR) found that 58 percent of Palestinians supported armed attacks against Israeli civilians inside Israel and 92 percent supported armed confrontations against the Israeli army in the West Bank and the Gaza Strip. A May 2002 poll by the center found that support for bombings of civilians inside Israel dropped to 52%, but support for armed attacks against Israeli settlers remained "very high" at 89 percent. Support for armed attacks against soldiers stood at 92 percent. A poll after the 2003 Maxim restaurant suicide bombing, in which 20 Israelis were killed, concluded that 75 percent of Palestinians supported the attack, with support higher "in the Gaza Strip (82%) compared to the West Bank (70%), in refugee camps (84%) compared to towns and villages (69%), among women (79%) compared to men (71%), among the young (78%) compared to the old (66%), among students (81%) compared to professionals (33%), and among supporters of Hamas (92%) compared to supporters of Fateh (69%)".

The firing of rockets from Beit Hanoun into Israel was acceptable to about three-quarters of the Palestinian public in the occupied territories, and was higher in the West Bank (78%) compared to the Gaza Strip (71%), among students (83%) compared to merchants (63%), and among supporters of Hamas (86%) compared to supporters of Fatah (73%). While firing rockets from Beit Hanoun was supported by a majority of Palestinians (75%), 59% of the residents of Beit Hanoun rejected this practice. 83% of Palestinians favored a mutual cessation of violence.

A report by the Jerusalem Media and Communication Center, a Palestinian organization, showing trends based on polls conducted since 1997, indicated that Palestinian support for military operations against Israeli targets stood at 34–40 percent in 1997–1999, climbed to 65–85 percent in 2000–2004, and dropped back to 41 percent at the end of 2004. "Military operations" were defined as including shootings, car bombs and mortar rocket attacks, but not suicide bombings. A 2005 poll by the center indicated that 53 percent of Palestinians supported "the continuation of [the] Al-Aqsa Intifada, 50 percent supported "suicide bombings against Israeli civilians", and 36 percent supported "the resumption of military operations against Israeli targets".

A 2004 study by Victoroff et al. was conducted on a group of 52 boys, all 14 years old, from the al-Shati camp in Gaza. Forty-three percent of the boys reported that a family member had been wounded or killed by the IDF, and half lived in households where the father's employment was lost following the outbreak of the Second Intifada. "Sympathy for terrorism" was found to be correlated with depression and anxiety scores, as well as with the level of "perceived oppression", and "emotional distress". Of those who felt subject to unjust treatment, 77 percent expressed sympathy for political violence.

=== 2005–2012 ===
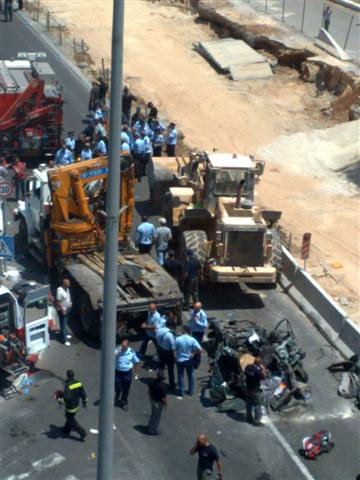
Jerusalem, July 2, 2008. A Palestinian man drives a front-end loader into several vehicles in Jerusalem, killing three before being shot dead.

A March 2008 report by Palestinian Center for Policy & Survey Research (PSR) noted that the level of support for armed attack against Israeli civilians inside Israel increased significantly with 67% supporting and 31% opposed, compared to support by 40% in 2005 and 55% in 2006. A February 2008 suicide bombing that killed one Israeli woman in Dimona was supported by 77% and opposed by 19%. An overwhelming majority of 84 percent supported the March 2008 Mercaz HaRav massacre, in which a Palestinian gunman killed eight students and wounded eleven in a Jerusalem school. Support for the attack was 91 percent in the Gaza Strip compared to 79 percent in the West Bank. Similar suicide attacks in 2005 had been less widely supported, with 29% support for a suicide attack that took place in Tel Aviv, and 37% support for another one in Beersheba.

The 2009 Hamas political violence took place in the Gaza Strip during and after the 2009 Gaza War. A series of violent acts, ranging from physical assaults, torture, and executions of Palestinians suspected of collaboration with the Israel Defense Forces, as well as members of the Fatah political party, occurred. According to Human Rights Watch, at least 32 people were killed by these attacks: 18 during the conflict and 14 afterward, and several dozen more were maimed, many by shots to the legs.

In 2012, the number of militant attacks in the West Bank rose from 320 in 2011 to 578 in 2012, including 282 in Jerusalem alone compared to 191 in 2011. According to an annual Shin Bet report, the increase was due in part to a 68% rise of attacks using molotov cocktails. The number of attacks involving firearms and explosives grew by 42%, from 26 to 37.

=== Casualties ===
Palestinian deaths by other Palestinians since 1982.

Conflict	Killed
Operation Pillar of Defense	8
Gaza War	75
Internal violence 2007–present	600
Battle of Gaza (2007)	130
Second Intifada	714
First Intifada	1,100
War of the Camps	

== Groups ==
=== Arab Committees in Mandatory Palestine ===
- Arab Higher Committee
  - Supreme Muslim Council
  - Reform Party
  - National Bloc
  - Youth Congress Party
  - Independence Party
  - National Defense Party
  - Palestine Arab Party
- Central Committee of National Jihad in Palestine
- Society for the Defense of Palestine
- al-Najjada
- Army of the Holy War
- (Arab League) Arab Liberation Army

=== 1948 onwards ===
- Hamas
  - Founded in 1987 by Ahmed Yassin and Mohammad Taha as an outgrowth of the Muslim Brotherhood, Hamas' goal is the establishment of a Palestinian state.
  - Armed wing is the Izz ad-Din al-Qassam Brigades; the sole target of its suicide bombings and missile attacks is Israel.
  - Took part in 2006 elections and won. After the 2007 Battle of Gaza the Hamas government was disbanded by Mahmoud Abbas but remained de facto rulers of the Gaza Strip.
  - Currently led by Khaled Mashal
- Palestinian Islamic Jihad (PIJ) (founded 1970s)
  - Formed by Fathi Shaqaqi as a branch of Egyptian Islamic Jihad
  - Goal is the destruction of the state of Israel and replacement with an Islamist state
  - Armed wing is the Al-Quds Brigades (Jerusalem brigades)
  - Currently led by Ramadan Shallah, the Secretary General and Abd Al Aziz Awda
- The Popular Resistance Committees
  - Islamist
  - Founded in 2000 by Jamal Abu Samhadana who led the group until he was killed in 2006.
  - Hamas linked group, based in the Gaza Strip
- Palestine Liberation Organization (PLO) (founded June 1964)
  - Formed as the political representation of the Palestinian people
  - Currently led by Mahmoud Abbas

=== PLO ===
- Popular Front for the Liberation of Palestine (PFLP) (founded 1967)
  - Left-wing
  - Joined the PLO in 1968 and became the second-largest PLO faction, after Arafat's al-Fatah, but withdrew in 1974, accusing the group of moving away from the goal of abolishing the State of Israel. It was led by Abu Ali Mustapha until his assassination in 2001.
  - Armed wing is the Abu Ali Mustapha Brigades and Jihad Jibril Brigades
  - Currently led by Ahmad Sa'adat
- Democratic Front for the Liberation of Palestine (DFLP) (founded 1969)
  - Marxist-Leninist group that believes Palestinian national goals can be achieved only through revolution of the masses. Split into two factions in 1991; Nayif Hawatmah leads the majority and more hard-line faction, which continue to dominate the group. Joined with other rejectionist groups to form the Alliance of Palestinian Forces (APF) to oppose the Declaration of Principles signed in 1993. Broke from the APF – along with the PFLP – over ideological differences. Has made limited moves towards merging with the PFLP since the mid-1990s.
- Abu Nidal organization (ANO), also known as Fatah – the Revolutionary Council (FRC), (founded 1974)
  - Split from PLO; part of the so-called rejectionist front, the ANO is a secular, nationalist group. Was led by Abu Nidal, widely regarded as the most ruthless of the Palestinian leaders, until his death in August 2002. According to Kameel Nasr, Arab and Israeli Terrorism, The group was infiltrated and influenced by Israeli security.
- Palestinian Liberation Front (PLF)
  - Minor Left wing faction
  - Founded in 196 by Ahmed Jibril and Shafiq al-Hout, re established in 1977 by Abu Abbas
- Arab Liberation Front (ALF)
  - Minor faction tied to the Iraqi Ba'ath Party
  - Founded in 1969, first leader was Zeid Heidar
  - Currently led by Rakad Salem
- As-Sa'iqa (VPLW)
  - Palestinian branch of the Syrian Ba'ath Party
  - Founded in 1966 as alternative to Fatah, organisation boycotts Palestinian National Authority and is opposed to Oslo Accords
  - Organisation was not active during the Second Intifada
  - Currently led by Farhan Abu Al-Hayja.
- Palestinian Popular Struggle Front (PPSF)
  - Minor Socialist faction formerly led by Samir Ghawshah
- Palestinian Arab Front (PAF)
  * Minor Arab Nationalist faction
  - Originally part of the ALF, split from the ALF in 1993
  - Supports the Palestinian right of return and creation of Palestinian state within 1967 borders
  - Currently led by Jameel Shihadeh.
- Fatah (founded early 1960s)
  - Palestinian nationalist political party
  - Reverse acronym for "Harekat at-Tahrir al-Wataniyyeh al-Falastiniyyeh" ("Palestinian National Liberation Movement" in Arabic)
  - Also known as the Movement for the National Liberation of Palestine
  - Founded by Yasser Arafat in 1959. Took control of the PLO in 1968, with Arafat as chairman.
  - Currently led by Mahmoud Abbas

==== Fatah associates ====
- Tanzim (founded 1995)
  - Means "organization" in Arabic
  - Loosely organized Fatah militia
  - Led by Marwan Barghouti until his arrest in 2002.
- Force 17 (early 1970s–2007)
  - Elite unit of the PLO once under Yasser Arafat's direct guidance.
  - Acts as a versatile unit for combat and intelligence-gathering.
  - Dismantled in 2007 and incorporated into the Palestinian Presidential Guard.
- Fatah Special Operations Group (Fatah-SOG)
  - Founded in the early 1970s by Col. Abdullah Abd al-Hamid Labib
  - Also known as the Martyrs of Tel Al Za'atar, Hawari, and Amn Araissi.
  - Recently inactive (as of 2004)
- Ahmed Abu Reish Brigade
  - Extremist offshoot of Fatah.
  - Was involved in the July 17, 2004, kidnappings in the Gaza Strip.
  - Possibly linked to the Popular Resistance Committees
  - Led by Ahmed Abu Reish
- Al Aqsa Martyrs Brigade
  - Responsible for many suicide bombings and shootings of Israeli civilians
  - Responsible for executing suspected conspirators and leaders of opposition against Arafat
  - Funded by Fatah and the Palestinian Authority
  - Offshoot of this group, Fatah Hawks, has carried out guerrilla attacks against Israeli military personnel in the Gaza Strip.
- Black September Organization (1970–1973)
  - Began as a small cell of Fatah men determined to take revenge upon King Hussein and the Jordanian army for Black September in Jordan. Recruits from the PFLP, as-Sa'iqa, and other groups also joined.
  - Carried out Munich massacre.
  - Carried out Attack on the Saudi embassy in Khartoum
  - In 1973 two members of the Black September attacked, with sub-machine guns and grenades, at the passenger lounge at Ellinikon International Airport in Athens, Greece. Three civilians have been killed and 55 have been wounded. After the attack the gunmen took hostages, for more than two hours, before surrendering to the Greek police. Most of the casualties and injured were Greeks and Americans.

==== Splinter ====
- Popular Front for the Liberation of Palestine - General Command (PFLP-GC) (founded 1968)
  - Splinter group from the PFLP, founded by Ahmed Jibril. Declared its focus would be military, not political. Was a member of the PLO, but left in 1974 for the same reasons as PFLP.

=== Al-Qaeda associates ===
- Army of Islam (Jaysh al-Islam)
  - Also known as the Tawhid and Jihad Brigades and al-Qaeda in Palestine
  - The group are an armed Gaza clan named Doghmush who are affiliated with al-Qaeda and Abu Qatada
- Abdullah Azzam Brigades
- Jund Ansar Allah (2008–)
  - al-Qaeda-affiliated group in the Gaza Strip, founded in November 2008 by Abdel Latif Moussa
  - In August 2009, the group proclaimed the creation of an Islamic emirate in Gaza and led an armed rebellion against Hamas.
  - The group's leader Abdel Latif Moussa was killed during that rebellion.
- Fatah al-Islam (2006–)
  - al-Qaeda-affiliated group involved in a conflict with the Lebanese army in 2007 over control of Palestinian refugee camps, which caused the death of nearly 500 people.
  - The group was established in 2006 by Shaker al-Abssi who led the group until killed by Lebanese forces in 2007.
  - Abu Mohamad Awad succeeded al-Abbsi as the group's leader.
- Jund al-Sham (1999–2008)
  - Radical Islamist group set up by Palestinians and Syrians which operated in different areas of the Middle East.
  - The group's leader Abu Youssef Sharqieh was captured by Lebanese forces during the 2007 conflict in Palestinian refugee camps.
  - The group was disbanded in 2008 as its members joined Lebanese al-Qaeda affiliated group Osbat al-Ansar.
- Jaljalat (2006–)
  - A Hamas-splinter organisation founded in 2006 by Mahmoud Taleb, a former al-Qassam Brigades commander, after he opposed Hamas joining the 2006 elections
  - The group is affiliated with both Jund Ansar Allah and al-Qaeda
- Jahafil Al-Tawhid Wal-Jihad fi Filastin (2008–)
  - al-Qaeda-affiliated group in the Gaza Strip, founded in November 2008 by Abu al-Walid al-Maqdisi

=== Sabireen Movement ===
The Sabireen Movement's leadership converted to Shia Islam in 2014. It is at odds with Hamas and Palestinian Islamic Jihad, and supports Hezbollah, Iran and Syria.

== Notable attacks ==
=== In Israel and Palestine ===
Year	Main article	Location	Perpetrator	Fatalities
1953	Yehud attack	Yehud		3 civilians
1954	Ma'ale Akrabim massacre	Scorpions Pass, Route 227		11 civilians
1956	Shafrir synagogue shooting	Kfar Chabad		6 civilians
1956	Ein Ofarim killings	near Hatzeva		3 civilians
1956	Negev desert road ambush	Highway 25, Southern District		5 civilians
1970	Avivim school bus bombing	Avivim	PFLP-GC	12 civilians
1971	Murder of the Aroyo children	Gaza Strip		2 civilians
1972	Lod Airport massacre	Lod Airport	Japanese Red Army and PFLP-EO	24 civilians
1974	Kiryat Shmona massacre	Kiryat Shmona	PFLP-GC	18 civilians
1974	Ma'alot massacre	Ma'alot-Tarshiha	DFLP	31 civilians
1974	Nahariya attack	Nahariya	Fatah	3 civilians, 1 soldier
1974	Beit She'an attack	Beit She'an	DFLP	4 civilians
1975	Savoy Hotel attack	Tel Aviv	PLO	8 civilians, 3 soldiers
1975	Kfar Yuval hostage crisis	Kfar Yuval	Arab Liberation Front	3 civilians
1975	Zion Square refrigerator bombing	Zion Square, Jerusalem	PLO	15 civilians
1978	Coastal Road massacre	Coastal Highway, near Tel Aviv	Fatah and PLO	38 civilians, 1 soldier
1979	Nahariya attack	Nahariya	PLF	4 civilians
1980	Misgav Am hostage crisis	Misgav Am	Arab Liberation Front	3 civilians
1983	Murder of Danny Katz	Northern District		1 civilian
1984	Bus 300 affair	near Deir al-Balah, Gaza Strip	PFLP	1 civilian
1987	Night of the Gliders	near Kiryat Shmona	PFLP-GC	6 soldiers
1988	Mothers' bus attack	near Aroer	PLO	3 civilians
1989	Killing of Binyamin Meisner	Nablus, West Bank		1 soldier
1989	Killing of Avi Sasportas and Ilan Saadon	Southern District	Hamas	2 civilians
1989	Tel Aviv–Jerusalem bus attack	near Kiryat Yearim		16 civilians
1992	Night of the Pitchforks	IDF training base near Gal'ed		3 soldiers
1992	Murder of Helena Rapp	Bat Yam		1 civilian
1993	Mehola Junction bombing	Mehola, West Bank	Hamas	1 civilian
1993	Abduction and killing of Yaron Chen	Ramallah, West Bank	Hamas	1 soldier
1994	Afula bus suicide bombing	Afula	Hamas and PIJ	8 civilians
1994	Hadera bus station suicide bombing	Hadera	Hamas	5 civilians
1994	Dizengoff Street bus bombing	Tel Aviv	Hamas	22 civilians
1994	Netzarim Junction bicycle bombing	Netzarim Junction, Gaza Strip	PIJ	3 soldiers
1994	Afula axe attack	Afula	Hamas	1 soldier
1995	Beit Lid suicide bombing	Beit Lid Junction	PIJ	22 soldiers, 1 civilian
1995	Kfar Darom bus attack	near Kfar Darom, Gaza Strip	PIJ	1 civilian, 7 soldiers
1995	Ramat Gan bus bombing	Tel Aviv	Hamas	6 civilians
1995	Ramat Eshkol bus bombing	Jerusalem	Hamas	5 civilians, 1 police officer
1996	Jaffa Road bus bombings	Jerusalem	Hamas	17 civilians, 9 soldiers
1996	Dizengoff Center suicide bombing	Tel Aviv	Hamas	12 civilians, 1 soldier
1996	Murder of Yaron and Efrat Ungar	Route 383 near Gefen	Al-Qassam Brigades	2 civilians
1997	Café Apropo bombing	Tel Aviv	Hamas	3 civilians
1997	Mahane Yehuda Market bombings	Jerusalem	Hamas	16 civilians
1997	Ben Yehuda Street bombing	Jerusalem	Hamas	5 civilians
2000	Ramallah lynching	Ramallah, West Bank		2 soldiers
2001	Murder of Ofir Rahum	Ramallah, West Bank		1 civilian
2001	Azor attack	Azor	Hamas	7 soldiers, 1 civilian
2001	Netanya bombing	Netanya	Hamas	3 civilians
2001	Murder of Shalhevet Pass	Hebron, West Bank	Tanzim	1 civilian
2001	HaSharon Mall suicide bombing	Netanya	Hamas	6 civilians
2001	Dolphinarium discotheque massacre	Tel Aviv	Hamas	21 civilians
2001	Sbarro restaurant suicide bombing	Jerusalem	Hamas	16 civilians
2001	Binyamina train station suicide bombing	Binyamina-Giv'at Ada	PIJ	2 soldiers
2001	Nahariya train station suicide bombing	Nahariya	Hamas	3 civilians
2001	Assassination of Rehavam Ze'evi	Jerusalem	PFLP	1 civilian
2001	Camp 80 junction bus 823 attack	near Pardes Hanna-Karkur	Fatah and PIJ	3 civilians
2001	Ben Yehuda Street bombing	Jerusalem	Hamas	11 civilians
2001	Haifa bus 16 suicide bombing	Haifa	Hamas	15 civilians
2002	Hadera attack	Hadera	Al-Aqsa Martyrs' Brigades	6 civilians
2002	Jaffa Street bombing	Jerusalem	Al-Aqsa Martyrs' Brigades	1 civilian
2002	Karnei Shomron Mall suicide bombing	Karnei Shomron, West Bank	PFLP	3 civilians
2002	Yeshivat Beit Yisrael bombing	Jerusalem	Al-Aqsa Martyrs' Brigades	10 civilians
2002	Seafood Market attack	Tel Aviv	Al-Aqsa Martyrs' Brigades	2 civilians, 1 police officer
2002	Atzmona attack	Atzmona, Gaza Strip	Hamas	5 civilians
2002	Café Moment bombing	Jerusalem	Hamas	11 civilians
2002	Matzuva attack	Matzuva	PIJ	5 civilians, 1 soldier
2002	King George Street bombing	Jerusalem	Hamas	3 civilians
2002	Passover massacre	Netanya	Hamas	30 civilians
2002	Kiryat HaYovel supermarket bombing	Jerusalem	Hamas	2 civilians
2002	Matza restaurant suicide bombing	Haifa	Hamas	16 civilians
2002	Yagur Junction bombing	Highway 70, east of Haifa	Hamas	6 soldiers, 2 civilians
2002	Mahane Yehuda Market bombing	Jerusalem	Al-Aqsa Martyrs' Brigades	6 civilians
2002	Sheffield Club bombing	Rishon LeZion	Hamas	16 civilians
2002	Netanya Market bombing	Netanya	Hamas and PFLP	3 civilians
2002	Megiddo Junction bus bombing	Megiddo Junction	PIJ	13 soldiers, 4 civilians
2002	Herzliya bombing	Herzliya	Al-Aqsa Martyrs' Brigades	1 civilian
2002	Patt Junction bus bombing	Jerusalem	Hamas	19 civilians
2002	Itamar attack	Itamar, West Bank	PFLP	5 civilians
2002	Immanuel bus attack	Immanuel, West Bank	DFLP and Fatah	9 civilians
2002	Neve Shaanan Street bombing	Tel Aviv	PIJ	5 civilians
2002	Hebrew University bombing	Jerusalem	Hamas	9 civilians
2002	Meron Junction Bus 361 attack	Meron Junction, near Safed	Hamas	6 civilians, 3 soldiers
2002	Kissufim tank ambush	Kissufim		2 soldiers
2002	Allenby Street bus bombing	Tel Aviv	Hamas	6 civilians
2002	Karkur junction suicide bombing	Karkur	PIJ	7 civilians, 7 soldiers
2002	Sonol gas station bombing	Ariel, West Bank	Hamas	3 soldiers
2002	Metzer attack	Metzer	Al-Aqsa Martyrs' Brigades	5 civilians
2002	Hebron ambush	Hebron, West Bank	PIJ	12 soldiers
2002	Kiryat Menachem bus bombing	Jerusalem	Hamas	11 civilians
2002	Beit She'an attack	Beit She'an	Al-Aqsa Martyrs' Brigades	6 civilians
2002	Yeshivat Otniel shooting	Otniel, West Bank	PIJ	4 civilians
2003	Tel Aviv central bus station massacre	Tel Aviv		23 civilians
2003	Haifa bus 37 suicide bombing	Haifa	Hamas	17 civilians
2003	Mike's Place suicide bombing	Tel Aviv	Hamas and Al-Aqsa Martyrs' Brigades	3 civilians
2003	French Hill suicide bombings	East Jerusalem	Hamas	7 civilians
2003	Afula mall bombing	Afula	PIJ and Al-Aqsa Martyrs' Brigades	3 civilians
2003	Davidka Square bus bombing	Jerusalem	Hamas	17 civilians
2003	Murder of Oleg Shaichat	near Kafr Kana	"Free People of the Galilee"	1 soldier
2003	Shmuel HaNavi bus bombing	Jerusalem	Hamas	23 civilians
2003	Tzrifin bus stop attack	Tzrifin	Hamas	9 soldiers
2003	Café Hillel bombing	Jerusalem		7 civilians
2003	Maxim restaurant suicide bombing	Haifa	PIJ	21 civilians
2003	Geha Interchange bus stop bombing	Geha Interchange	PFLP	3 soldiers, 1 civilian
2004	Erez Crossing bombing	Erez Crossing	Hamas and Al-Aqsa Martyrs' Brigades	4 civilians
2004	2004 Jerusalem bus 19 bombing	Jerusalem	Hamas and Al-Aqsa Martyrs' Brigades	11 civilians
2004	Liberty Bell Park bus bombing	Jerusalem	Al-Aqsa Martyrs' Brigades	8 civilians
2004	Ashdod Port bombings	Ashdod	Hamas and Fatah	10 civilians
2004	Murder of the Hatuel family	Kissufim		5 civilians
2004	Beersheba bus bombings	Beersheba	Hamas	16 civilians
2004	Carmel Market bombing	Tel Aviv	PFLP	3 civilian
2004	IDF outpost bombing attac	IDF outpost near the Philadelphi Route	Hamas and Fatah	
2005	Karni border crossing attack	Karni Crossing	Hamas, al-Aqsa Martyrs' Brigades and the Popular Resistance Committees	6 civilians
2005	Stage Club bombing	Tel Aviv	PIJ	5 civilians
2005	HaSharon Mall suicide bombing	Netanya	PIJ	5 civilians
2005	Hadera Market bombing	Hadera	PIJ	7 civilians
2005	HaSharon Mall suicide bombing	Netanya	PIJ	5 civilians
2005	2nd Rosh Ha'ir restaurant bombing	Tel Aviv	PIJ	11 civilians
2005	Kidnapping and murder of Sasson Nuriel	East Jerusalem	Hamas	1 civilian
2006	Kedumim bombing	Kedumim, West Bank	Al-Aqsa Martyrs' Brigades	4 civilians
2006	Gaza cross-border raid	near Kerem Shalom	Izz ad-Din al-Qassam Brigades, Popular Resistance Committees and the Army of Islam	2 soldiers
2006	Murder of Eliyahu Asheri	West Bank	Popular Resistance Committees	1 civilian
2007	Eilat bombing	Eilat	Al-Aqsa Martyrs' Brigades and PIJ	3 civilians
2007	Nahal Telem shooting	Nahal Telem, West Bank		2 soldiers
2008	Dimona suicide bombing	Dimona	Hamas	1 civilian
2008	Jerusalem yeshiva attack	Jerusalem		8 civilians
2008	Jerusalem bulldozer attack	Jerusalem		3 civilians
2009	Bat Ayin axe attack	Bat Ayin, West Bank		1 civilian
2009	Killing of Rabbi Meir Hai	Highway 57, near Shavei Shomron, West Bank	Al-Aqsa Martyrs' Brigades	1 civilian
2010	Tapuah Junction stabbing	Kfar Tapuach, West Bank		1 soldier
2010	West Bank shooting attack	near Kiryat Arba, West Bank	Hamas	4 civilians
2010	Murders of Neta Sorek and Kristine Luken	Beit Jamal and Beit Shemesh		2 civilians
2011	Itamar attack	Itamar, West Bank		5 civilians
2011	Sha'ar HaNegev school bus attack	Negev		1 civilian
2011	Jerusalem bus stop bombing	Jerusalem	Hamas	2 civilians
2011	Murder of Asher and Yonatan Palmer	Kiryat Arba, West Bank		2 civilians
2013	Tapuah Junction stabbing	Kfar Tapuach, West Bank		1 civilian
2014	Murder of Shelly Dadon	Migdal HaEmek		1 civilian
2014	Gush Etzion kidnapping and murder	Gush Etzion, West Bank	Hamas	3 civilians
2014	Jerusalem tractor attack	Jerusalem		1 civilian
2014	October Jerusalem vehicular attack	East Jerusalem		2 civilians
2014	November Jerusalem vehicular attack	Jerusalem		3 civilians
2014	Killing of Sergeant Almog Shiloni	Tel Aviv		1 civilian
2014	Murder of Dalia Lemkus	Alon Shvut, West Bank		1 civilian
2014	Jerusalem synagogue attack	Jerusalem		6 civilians
2015	Shvut Rachel shooting	Allon Road, West Bank		1 civilian
2015	Murder of Eitam and Na'ama Henkin	near Beit Furik, West Bank	Hamas	2 civilians
2015	Lions' Gate stabbings	Jerusalem		2 civilians
2015	Beersheba bus station shooting	Beersheba		1 civilian
2015	Gush Etzion Junction attack	Gush Etzion Junction, West Bank		3 civilians
2016	January Tel Aviv shooting	Tel Aviv		3 civilians
2016	Tel Aviv stabbings	Tel Aviv		1 civilian
2016	June Tel Aviv shooting	Tel Aviv		4 civilians
2016	Murder of Hallel Yaffa Ariel	Kiryat Arba, West Bank		1 civilian
2016	Jerusalem shooting	East Jerusalem		2 civilians
2017	Jerusalem truck attack	Jerusalem		4 soldiers
2017	Jerusalem Light Rail stabbing	Jerusalem		1 civilian
2017	June Jerusalem attack	Jerusalem		4 police officers
2017	Temple Mount shooting	Jerusalem	Islamic Movement in Israel	2 police officers
2017	Har Adar shooting	Har Adar, West Bank		3 security guards
2018	Murder of Itamar Ben Gal	Ariel, West Bank		1 civilian
2018	Barkan Industrial Park shooting	Barkan Industrial Park, West Bank		2 civilians
2019	Samaria combined attack	Samaria, West Bank		1 civilian, 1 soldier
2019	Murder of Dvir Sorek	Migdal Oz, West Bank		1 civilian
2022	Beersheba attack	Beersheba		4 civilians
2022	Bnei Brak shootings	Bnei Brak		5 civilians
2023	Hamra junction shootings	Highway 57, West Bank	Al-Qassam Brigades	3 civilians
2023	Tel Aviv car-ramming	off Kaufmann Street in Tel Aviv, Israel	suspected	1 civilian
2023	2023 Hamas-led attack on Israel	Gaza Strip Envelope	Hamas	797 civilians, 379 soldiers
2024	Lehi Street bombing	Lehi Street, Tel Aviv	Hamas, PIJ	
2025	2025 al-Funduq shooting	West Bank	Al-Qassam Brigades members and a Al-Quds Brigades member in the Jenin Brigades	3 Dead
2025	2025 Karkur junction ramming attack	Karkur Junction		1 Civilian
2025	2025 Ramot Junction shooting	Jerusalem	Hamas	8 Dead
2025	Gush Etzion Junction Attack	Gush Etzion	Palestinian Islamic Jihad	1 Civilian
2025	2025 Harod Valley attack	Harod Valley		2 Civilians

=== International attacks ===
Year	Country	Events
1968	Greece	El Al Flight 253 attack
1968	USA	Assassination of Robert F. Kennedy
1970	Switzerland	Swissair Flight 330
1970	Germany	1970 Munich bus attack
1972	Germany	Munich massacre
1972	Yemen	Lufthansa Flight 649
1972	Thailand	Bangkok Israeli embassy hostage crisis
1973	Greece	Hellinikon Airport attack
1973	USA	NYC bomb plot
1973	Japan	Hijacking of Japan Air Lines Flight 404
1973	Italy, Greece, Syria, Kuwait	Rome airport attacks and Hijacking of Lufthansa Flight 303
1973	Sudan	Attack on the Saudi Embassy in Khartoum
1974	Mediterranean Sea	TWA Flight 841 crashing
1974	Kuwait	Japanese Embassy attack
1975	France	1975 Orly Airport attacks
1976	Greece, Uganda	Hijacking of Air France Flight 139
1976	Turkey	Yeşilköy airport attack
1977	France, Italy, Cyprus, Bahrain, UAE, Yemen, Somalia	Lufthansa Flight 181
1978	France	1978 Orly Airport attack
1978	UK	London bus attack
1980	France	Paris synagogue bombing
1981	Belgium	Antwerp bombing
1985	Italy, Austria	Rome and Vienna airport attacks
1985	Egypt	Achille Lauro hijacking
1985	Cyprus	Larnaca yacht killings
1985	Malta	EgyptAir Flight 648
1990	Egypt	1990 Cairo bus attack
1994	Argentina	AMIA bombing
2002	Kenya	2002 Mombasa attacks
2004	Egypt	2004 Sinai bombings

== See also ==
- Violence in the Israeli–Palestinian conflict
- List of killings and massacres in Mandatory Palestine
- Islamic terrorism
- Martyrdom in Palestinian society
- Palestinian casualties of war
- Palestinian right of armed resistance
- List of extrajudicial killings and political violence in Lebanon
- Zionist political violence
- Israeli settler violence
- Israeli casualties of war
