= Orly Airport attack =

Orly Airport attack may refer to:

- 1975 Orly Airport attacks
- 1978 Orly Airport attack
- 1983 Orly Airport attack
- 2017 Orly Airport attack
