= List of terrorist incidents in 1978 =

This is a timeline of incidents in 1978 that have been labelled as "terrorism" and are not believed to have been carried out by a government or its forces (see state terrorism and state-sponsored terrorism).

== Guidelines ==
- To be included, entries must be notable (have a stand-alone article) and described by a consensus of reliable sources as "terrorism".
- List entries must comply with the guidelines outlined in the manual of style under MOS:TERRORIST.
- Casualties figures in this list are the total casualties of the incident including immediate casualties and later casualties (such as people who succumbed to their wounds long after the attacks occurred).
- Casualties listed are the victims. Perpetrator casualties are listed separately (e.g. x (+y) indicate that x victims and y perpetrators were killed/injured).
- Casualty totals may be underestimated or unavailable due to a lack of information. A figure with a plus (+) sign indicates that at least that many people have died (e.g. 10+ indicates that at least 10 people have died) – the actual toll could be considerably higher. A figure with a plus (+) sign may also indicate that over that number of people are victims.
- If casualty figures are 20 or more, they will be shown in **bold**. In addition, figures for casualties more than 50 will also be **underlined**.
- Incidents are limited to one per location per day. If multiple attacks occur in the same place on the same day, they will be merged into a single incident.
- In addition to the guidelines above, the table also includes the following categories:

0 people were killed/injured by the incident.
1–19 people were killed/injured by the incident.
20–49 people were killed/injured by the incident.
50–99 people were killed/injured by the incident.
100+ people were killed/injured by the incident.

== List ==
Date	Type	Dead	Injured	Location	Details	Perpetrator	Part of
January 7	Shooting	2	1	Rome, Italy	A leftist terrorist group attacked the office of the Italian Social Movement, killing three people in an event known as the Acca Larentia Massacre.	Nuclei Armati di Contropotere Territoriale	
February 1	Poisoning	0	5	Netherlands	Members of the Arab Revolutionary Council poison Israeli oranges with mercury, injuring five children.	Arab Revolutionary Council	Israeli–Palestinian conflict
February 4	Ambush	10	Unknown	Carare-Opon region, Colombia	Guerrillas from the IV front of the FARC ambush two Army trucks in Campo Capote. A second lieutenant and 9 soldiers are killed.	FARC	Colombian conflict
February 13	Bombing	3	9	Sydney, Australia	A bomb placed in a garbage bin at the Hilton Hotel explodes while the bin was being emptied into a garbage truck. Two garbage collectors and a police officer were killed and nine others were wounded. The perpetrators were never identified, but the hotel was hosting the first ever Commonwealth Heads of Government Meeting which was the likely target.	Unknown	
February 17	Bombing	12	30	County Down, Northern Ireland	The Provisional Irish Republican Army plants an incendiary bomb outside the La Mon restaurant in Gransha. The bomb exploded before the restaurant could be evacuated after PIRA phoned in a threat.	PIRA	The Troubles
February 18	Shooting	1	20	Nicosia, Cyprus	Two assassins killed prominent Egyptian newspaper editor Youssef Sebai and then rounded up several Arabs who were attending a convention as hostages. As Cypriot forces were trying to negotiate with the hostage-takers at the airport, Egyptian troops decided to launch their own assault without authorization from the Cypriots. The unauthorized raid led to the Egyptians and the Cypriots exchanging gunfire, killing or injuring more than 20 of the Egyptian commandos.		
February 24	Bombing	1	0	Tenerife, Spain	Police officer Rafael Valdenebro attempted to deactivate a bomb placed by the group in San Cristóbal de La Laguna, which was intended to assassinate a local lawyer. He was hit in the head, arms and legs and died on March 8.	MPAIAC	Terrorism in Spain
March 3	Bombing	1	3	Port Elizabeth, South Africa	Bomb explodes outside Government offices.	Umkhonto We Sizwe	Internal resistance to apartheid
March 11	Massacre	39 (+9)	71	Tel Aviv, Israel	11 PLO terrorists hijack a bus on Coastal highway and take dozens of civilians hostage. 38 civilians and one Israeli soldier are killed when police attempt to raid the bus, which burst into flames.	PLO	Israeli–Palestinian conflict
March 13–14	Hostage-taking	2	1	Assen, Netherlands	Three South Moluccans took 70 hostages at the provincial hall, demanding the release of Molucccan prisoners. Two hostage were executed and a photographer was wounded.	South Moluccan freedom fighters	
March 16 – May 9	Kidnapping, murder	6	0	Italy	Former prime minister and leader of the Democrazia Cristiana party, Aldo Moro, is kidnapped by Red Brigades terrorists on March 16. The terrorists kill his five bodyguards. Moro is found murdered after 55 days of captivity.	Red Brigades	
March 16	Massacre	7	41	Beyazıt Square, Istanbul, Turkey	The Beyazıt massacre was the killing of students at Istanbul University, in which 7 died and 41 were injured.	Grey Wolves (organization)	Political violence in Turkey (1976–1980)
March 17	Bombing	2	2	Lemoiz, Spain	ETA planted a bomb in the under-construction Lemóniz nuclear reactor, killing two workers (Andrés Guerra and Alberto Negro), wounded two more, and causing substantial damage to the reactor itself. Further ETA actions ultimately resulted in the cancellation of the project.	ETA	Basque conflict, Anti-nuclear movement in Spain
March 17	Massacre	5		Ümraniye, Istanbul, Turkey	Ümraniye Massacre in the 1 Mayıs District (now Mustafa Kemal District), five workers (Salih Ulug, Ömer Bayraktar, Cevat Koca, Bahri Bilgin and Sinan Koca) who were members of the Nationalist Confederation of Trade Unions and came from the Çanakçı district of Giresun were killed by members of the (TİKKO).	TİKKO	Political violence in Turkey (1976–1980)
April 13	Attempted car bombing	0	1	Guipuzcoa, Spain	Several individuals tried to plant an explosive device at ADEGUI's headquarters in San Sebastián. The attack was partially unsuccessful. One of the perpetrators was wounded in detonating the bomb early and escaped from the scene of the attack by car. The militant, identified as Vicente Aldalur, was hospitalized in France for severe burns.	Comandos Autonomos Anticapitalistas	Basque conflict
May 9	Shooting	2	3	Eastern Highlands, Rhodesia	Two civilians were killed during an attack on the Montclair Hotel. Guerillas fired at least three rocket-propelled grenades, before opening fire with AK-47 assault rifles.	ZANLA	Rhodesian Bush War
May 20	Shooting	2 (+3)	5	Paris, France	Three terrorists fire on El Al passengers in the departure lounge of Orly Airport, resulting in the death of all three terrorists and one policeman, with three French tourists injured.	Palestinians	Israeli–Palestinian conflict
May 24	Assassination	1	0	Guipúzcoa, Spain	A taxi driver was beaten and shot dead by the Batallón Vasco Español which accused the taxi driver of having helped an ETA attack.	Batallón Vasco Español	Basque Conflict
May 25	Bombing	0	1	Evanston, Illinois, United States	Police officer Terry Marker is injured by a bomb sent to professor Buckley Crist at Northwestern University by Theodore Kaczynski.	Theodore Kaczynski	
June 7	Shooting	2	2	Figtree, Rhodesia	Two British women mission teachers were shot dead and two other missionaries wounded during a raid by ZIPRA guerrillas on the Salvation Army Usher Institute.	Zimbabwe People's Revolutionary Army (ZIPRA)	Rhodesian Bush War
June 23	Massacre	12	0	Vumba Mountains, Rhodesia	Eight British missionaries and four young children – including a three-week-old baby – were beaten, stabbed and axed to death at Elim Mission near Umtali (now Mutare) on the border with Mozambique. Most of the women were also sexually assaulted.		Rhodesian Bush War
June 27	Shooting	2	0	Hartley district, Rhodesia	Two German-born missionaries, Father Gregor Richert (48) and Brother Bernhard Lisson (68), were shot by a small group of terrorists near their quarters at St. Rupert's Mission.		Rhodesian Bush War
August 10	Massacre	5	14	Çankaya, Ankara, Turkey	Balgat Massacre. Four coffeehouses with left-wingers were fired from a car with automatic weapons. As a result of the gunfire, four people were killed and eleven people were injured, two seriously.	Mustafa Pehlivanoğlu and Haydar Şahin	Political violence in Turkey (1976–1980)
August 13	Bombing	175	80	Beirut, Lebanon	A bomb destroys an office building in West Beirut housing the headquarters of the Palestinian Liberation Front, killing more than 175 people and injuring another 80. The bombing was allegedly carried out by the Popular Front for the Liberation of Palestine – General Command.	PFLP-GC	Palestinian insurgency in South Lebanon
August 14	Shooting	12	0	Cimitarra, Colombia	FARC members murder 12 peasants in Santander Department.	FARC	Colombian conflict
August 19	Shooting	6	Unknown	Boyacá, Colombia	FARC guerrillas attack troops from the battalion of engineers "Baraya", and kill 6 soldiers in Otanche	FARC	Colombian conflict
August 19	Shooting	2	2	Managua, Nicaragua	Two people who collaborated in the regime of General Anastasio Somoza were shot dead and two other policemen injured.	Sandinists	
August 19	Arson	377+		Abadan, Iran	As a result of arson in the Cinema Rex, some 377 people were killed. Upon perceiving the fire, the 700 audiences of the cinema rushed towards the exit doors, but found them closed. Hundreds of people had packed into the cinema to watch the film The Deers.	Disputed	Iranian Revolution
August 20	Shooting, grenade attacks	1 (+1)	9	London, United Kingdom	A crew bus of El Al was attacked by three members of the Popular Front for the Liberation of Palestine (PFLP). A flight attendant and one suspected terrorist were killed in the attack, and nine people were injured.	PFLP	Israeli–Palestinian conflict
September 1–6	Bombings	0	2	Speedway, United States	A series of eight bombings occurs in the town of Speedway, Indiana. A Vietnam War veteran and his wife are seriously wounded in the last bombing. A local drug dealer named Brett Kimberlin is convicted of the bombings. The motive for the bombings was never determined but they may have been meant to serve as a distraction from a murder which Kimbelin was allegedly involved with.	Brett Kimberlin	
September 3	Aircraft shootdown	48	8	Karoi, Rhodesia	Members of ZIPRA shot down Air Rhodesia Flight 825 from Kariba to Salisbury killing 48 civilians. 38 were killed in the crash and 10 survivors were shot with automatic weapons.	ZIPRA	Rhodesian Bush War
October 9	Bahçelievler massacre	7		Bahçelievler, Ankara, Turkey	Latif Can, Efraim Ezgin, Hürcan Gürses, Osman Nuri Uzunlar, Serdar Alten, Faruk Ersan and Salih Gevence, young members of the Workers Party of Turkey, were killed.	Grey Wolves (organization)	Political violence in Turkey (1976–1980)
October 22	Shooting	3	1	Getxo, Spain	Four Civil Guards are shot by ETA while returning from a football match. Three die.	ETA	Basque conflict
December 19–26	Massacre	120	1000+	Kahramanmaraş Province, Turkey	Massacre of Alevis. According to official figures, 120 people were killed during the events. 559 houses belonging to Alevis were burned, nearly 290 workplaces were destroyed.	Grey Wolves (organization)	Political violence in Turkey (1976–1980)
December 31	Theft	0	0	Bogotá, Colombia	Members of the M-19 enter a tunnel to steal more than 5000 weapons in the North Canton, main deposit of arms of the Military Forces of Colombia.	Movimiento 19 Abril	Colombian conflict
