= 2002 Kissufim tank ambush =

2002 incident in Gaza

On September 5, 2002, during the Second Intifada, an Israeli Merkava II tank was driving along a dirt road near the Kissufim crossing following figures identified as "suspicious" when it was blown up by a 100-kilogram bomb buried under the road. One soldier was killed instantly, while three soldiers were wounded. It took five hours to extricate the surviving soldiers from the burning tank.

The tank commander was blown out of the turret hatch but landed unharmed. It was the third deadly Palestinian assault on an Israeli tank in 2002.

According to the Israel Defense Forces, the incident began on the previous night, when anti-tank missiles were fired at an army post. Soldiers and the tank were sent to search for the rocket launchers, and militants detonated the bomb under the tank.

An Arab umbrella group dominated by Yasser Arafat's Fatah organization claimed responsibility, stating, "This operation came to prove that Palestinian fighters are capable of reaching everywhere.

== Response ==
Israel responded to the ambush by launching a helicopter missile strike at a metal workshop or foundry being used as a bomb factory in Khan Younis. The bomb-making factory was empty when it was targeted; there were no casualties.

Israel's defense minister, Binyamin Ben-Eliezer, stated that Israel would not return occupied areas of the Gaza Strip to the control of the Palestinian Authority, as it had pledged to do the previous month.
