= Hadera Market bombing =

Terrorist incident in Hadera, Israel

- Part of the Second Intifada militancy campaign
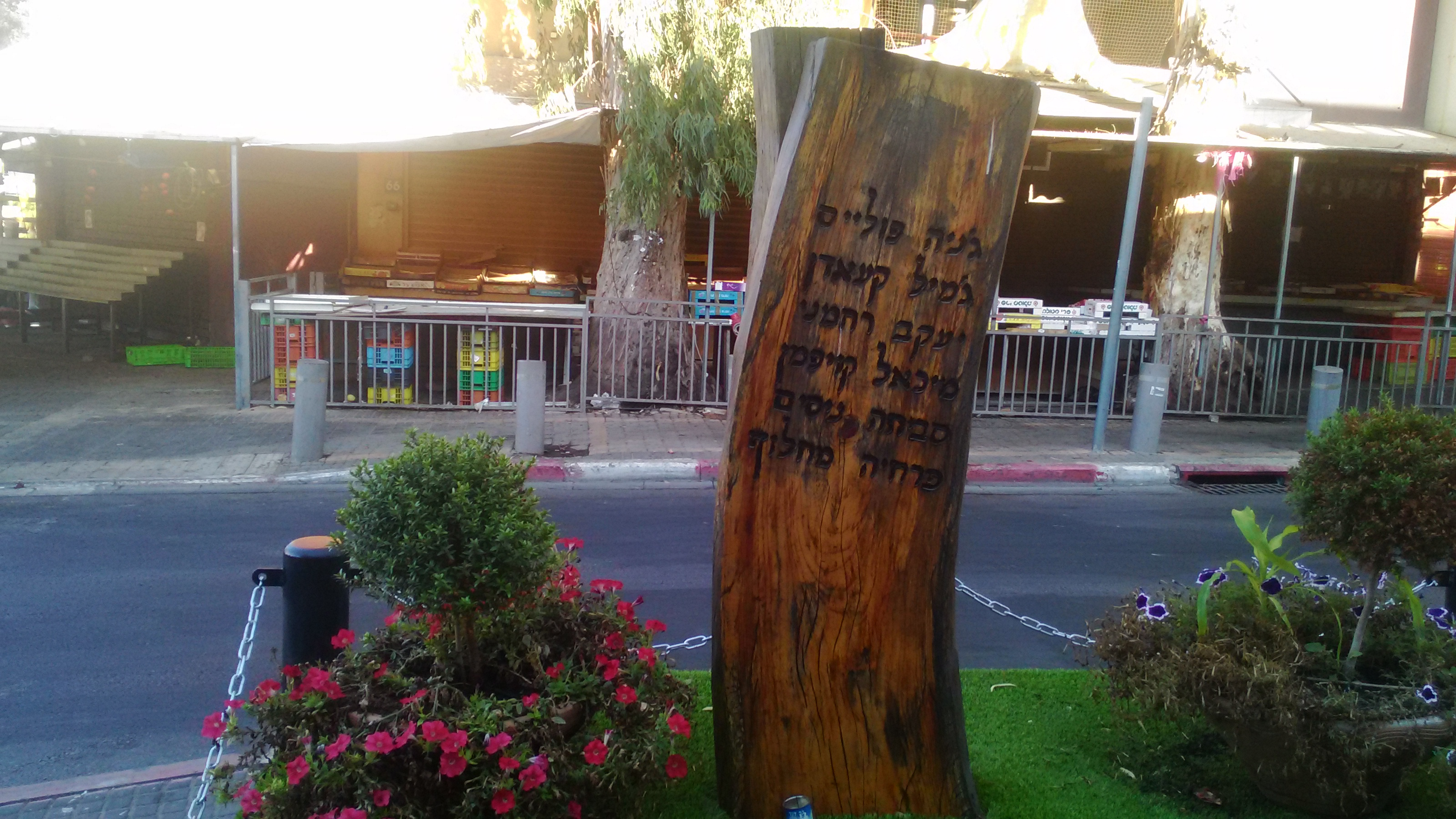
- A memorial for the attack victims

- The attack site
- Native name: הפיגוע בשוק בחדרה
- Location: 32°26′08″N 34°55′15″E; Hadera's open-air market, Hadera, Israel
- Date: October 26, 2005; 21 years ago
- Attack type: Suicide bombing
- Weapon: 5 kilograms (11 lb) suicide vest
- Deaths: 7 Israeli civilians (+1 bomber)
- Injuries: 55 Israeli civilians
- Perpetrator: Islamic Jihad organization claimed responsibility

The Hadera Market bombing was a suicide bombing which occurred on October 26, 2005 at the entrance to the main fruit and vegetable open-air market in Hadera. Seven people were killed in the attack, and 55 were injured, of them five in severe condition.

The Islamic Jihad claimed responsibility for the attack.

== The attack ==
On Wednesday, October 26, 2005, during the afternoon hours, a Palestinian suicide bomber who wore an explosive belt hidden underneath his clothes approached the open market place in the small Israeli coastal town of Hadera. The market place was busy with shoppers in advance of a Jewish Holiday, with many stocking up for the weekend. The suicide bomber detonated the explosive device at the market. The blast killed seven civilians and injured 55 people, of them five in severe condition.

Two Palestinian Islamist militant group Islamic Jihad claimed responsibility for the attack and stated that the attack was carried out by a 20-year-old Palestinian named Hassan Abu Zeid who originated from the Palestinian town Qabatiya in the West Bank.

== The perpetrators and Israeli response ==
The Islamist militant organization Palestinian Islamic Jihad claimed responsibility, and stated that the attack was carried out in revenge for the Israeli targeted killing of the Islamic Jihad commander Luay Saadi. Abu al-Muaman, one of the organization's leaders, stated in the press that "This attack is merely a preliminary response by the Palestinian rebellious groups, and harder retaliation is on its way." Israel retaliated by killing an Islamic Jihad's top commander in northern Gaza and another militant in an airstrike.

== Official reactions ==
Involved parties

Israel:

- An Israeli government spokesman called on the Palestinian Authority to increase its efforts to "disarm and dismantle the terror organization."

Palestinian territories:

- Palestinian National Authority - Palestinian Authority Chairman Mahmoud Abbas condemned the attack, saying: "It harms Palestinian interests and could widen the cycle of violence, chaos, extremism and bloodshed.".

International

United States: White House spokesman Scott McClellan condemned the attack and called on the Palestinian leadership to crack down on the Palestinian militants.
