= Attack on the Montclair Hotel =

- Part of Rhodesian Bush War
- Operational scope: Terrorist attack
- Planned by: Unknown
- Target: Guests staying at the Montclair Hotel
- Date: 9 May 1978
- Executed by: ZANLA
- Outcome: Hotel staff repel guerillas from the hotel
- Casualties: 2 killed 3 injured

The Attack on the Montclair Hotel was a terrorist attack on the hotel, which had once been popular among tourists spending their holidays in Rhodesia, by the Zimbabwe African National Liberation Army (ZANLA) on 9 May 1978. During the attack, the guerillas fired at least three rocket-propelled grenades at the hotel, before opening fire with AK-47 assault rifles.

During the attack, the guerillas killed two Rhodesian civilians and wounded three, including one American tourist. They were then chased away from the hotel by some of the staff who had armed themselves with guns, kept for protection from guerrillas. The two dead civilians were identified as Betty Verran of Juliasdale and Mrs. D. Groenewald of Salisbury.
