= List of terrorist incidents in 1973 =

This is a timeline of incidents in 1973 that have been labelled as "terrorism" and are not believed to have been carried out by a government or its forces (see state terrorism and state-sponsored terrorism).

== Guidelines ==
- To be included, entries must be notable (have a stand-alone article) and described by a consensus of reliable sources as "terrorism".
- List entries must comply with the guidelines outlined in the manual of style under MOS:TERRORIST.
- Casualties figures in this list are the total casualties of the incident including immediate casualties and later casualties (such as people who succumbed to their wounds long after the attacks occurred).
- Casualties listed are the victims. Perpetrator casualties are listed separately (e.g. x (+y) indicate that x victims and y perpetrators were killed/injured).
- Casualty totals may be underestimated or unavailable due to a lack of information. A figure with a plus (+) sign indicates that at least that many people have died (e.g. 10+ indicates that at least 10 people have died) – the actual toll could be considerably higher. A figure with a plus (+) sign may also indicate that over that number of people are victims.
- If casualty figures are 20 or more, they will be shown in **bold**. In addition, figures for casualties more than 50 will also be **underlined**.
- Incidents are limited to one per location per day. If multiple attacks occur in the same place on the same day, they will be merged into a single incident.
- In addition to the guidelines above, the table also includes the following categories:

0 people were killed/injured by the incident.
1–19 people were killed/injured by the incident.
20–49 people were killed/injured by the incident.
50–99 people were killed/injured by the incident.
100+ people were killed/injured by the incident.

== List ==
Date	Type	Dead	Injured	Location	Details	Perpetrator	Part of
January 7	Spree shooting	8	11	New Orleans, United States	After shooting two police officers a week earlier, Mark Essex, a former Black Panther Party member, shot 19 people (ten of them police officers) in retaliation for police killings at a Howard Johnsons hotel. He also set fires in the hotel before being killed by police.	Mark Essex	
January 20	Car bombing	1	14	Dublin, Ireland	1972 and 1973 Dublin bombings: A car bomb exploded near a betting shop, killing a bus conductor.	Ulster Volunteer Force	The Troubles
January 27	Assassination	2		Santa Barbara, California	Assassination of Mehmet Baydar and Bahadır Demir by an Armenian nationalist	Gourgen Yanikian	
March 1	Hostage-taking	3		Khartoum, Sudan	Attack on the Saudi Embassy in Khartoum: Black September took ten hostages (five of them diplomats) at the Saudi Arabian embassy. Three western diplomats were killed. Palestinian gunmen burst into the embassy, and took Moore hostage, as well as fellow American Cleo Allen Noel, a Belgian diplomat, and two others.	Black September	Israeli–Palestinian conflict
March 4	Attempted bombings	0	0	New York City, United States	1973 New York City bomb plot: Black September member Khalid Duhham Al-Jawary attempted to bomb three Israeli locations to coincide with Golda Meir's visit to the city. However, the bombs were poorly wired and failed to detonate.	Black September	Israeli–Palestinian conflict
March 8	Car bombing	1	200	London, United Kingdom	1973 Old Bailey bombing: PIRA car bombing of the Old Bailey courthouse, killing 1 person.	PIRA	The Troubles
March 23	Shootings	3	1	Belfast, United Kingdom	Provisional IRA Honey Trap killings: Two Provisional Irish Republican Army female operatives lured four British soldiers to a IRA safe house on Belfast's Antrim Road by pretending the house was used for parties with females and soldiers, once at the house one of the females said she was bringing back more women, she returned with two masked gunmen bursting into the house; one had a Thompson submachine gun and the other was carrying a Browning Hi-Power pistol, the soldiers were made kneel execution style, one soldier survived despite having his spine injuries as well as having part of his tongue and jaw shot off.	Provisional Irish Republican Army	The Troubles
April 16	Arson	2		Rome, Italy	Primavalle fire: 3 activists of Potere Operaio burned the house of a militant of the Italian Social Movement and killed his two sons.	Potere Operaio	Years of Lead
May 17	Bombing	4	52	Milan, Italy	Milan police headquarters bombing: Gianfranco Bertoli, an anarchist activist, supporter of Max Stirner, attacked police headquarters with a hand grenade during a commemorative ceremony with Italian Prime Minister Mariano Rumor.	Gianfranco Bertoli (lone wolf)	Years of Lead
May 18	Bombing	82	0	Lake Baikal, USSR	Aeroflot Flight 109 flying from Irkutsk Airport to Chita Airport exploded in flight after a passenger detonated a bomb when refused passage to China. The plane crashed east of Lake Baikal, Russia, killing all 82 passengers.	Lone wolf	
June 12	Car bombings	6	33	Coleraine, United Kingdom	1973 Coleraine bombings: Two Provisional Irish Republican Army car bombings targeted a wine shop and a garage. Six people were killed in the wine shop bombing and 33 others were injured.	Provisional Irish Republican Army	The Troubles
June 20	Massacre	13+	365+	Buenos Aires, Argentina	Ezeiza massacre: Massacre of left-wing Peronists at rally celebrating his return from Spain at Ezeiza International Airport. Right-wing Peronists were blamed for the massacre. 13 victims were positively identified but more people may have been killed.	Right-wing Peronists	
July 1	Assassination	1	0	Washington, D.C., United States	The Israeli attaché, Yosef Alon, was shot dead .	Black September (suspected)	Israeli–Palestinian conflict
July 20	Hijacking	0 (+1)	1	Japan	Japan Air Lines Flight 404: Hijacking by a member of the Japanese Red Army and four members of the Popular Front for the Liberation of Palestine. One of the terrorists is killed when his grenade accidentally detonates.	Japanese Red Army; PFLP	Israeli–Palestinian conflict
July 21	Assassination	1	0	Lillehammer, Norway	Israeli Mossad agents shot and killed Ahmed Bouchiki, a Moroccan waiter and brother of musician Chico Bouchikhi. The agents had mistaken their target for Ali Hassan Salameh, the chief of operations for Black September. Six of the Mossad team of fifteen were arrested and convicted of complicity in the killing by a Norwegian court, in a major blow to the intelligence agency's reputation.	Mossad	Israeli–Palestinian conflict
August 5	Mass shooting	3	58	Athens, Greece	1973 Athens Hellinikon International Airport attack: Two Palestinian terrorists opened fire and threw four grenades in the transit area of Ellinikon International Airport at passengers waiting to board flights for Geneva and New York City and took thirty to thirty five hostages. Surrounded by Greek Police, they surrendered after two hours. They declared that they belonged to Black September and their objective was to hijack a flight to Tel Aviv, but they missed the flight because they were confused by the airport signs.	Black September	Israeli–Palestinian conflict
August 30	Bombing	32	55	Cai Lậy District, Vietnam	Shelling of Cai Lay schoolyard: The shelling was an attack on a Cai Lậy District government-controlled schoolyard in Cai Lậy town, Định Tường province, South Vietnam on 30 August 1973,	Viet Cong	Vietnam War
tember 1	Bombings	0	21	London, United Kingdom	Bombings of King's Cross and Euston stations: The PIRA set off bombs at King's Cross and Euston stations, injuring 21 people.	PIRA	The Troubles
September 28–29	Hijacking	0	0	Marchegg, Austria	Two Arab terrorists hijacked the Chopin-Express from Moscow to Vienna at the East-West border. The train was often used by Jewish exiles from the USSR. The terrorists demanded the closure of an Austrian transit camp for Jews on their way to Israel. Chancellor Bruno Kreisky (Jewish himself) complied and allowed the terrorists to escape to Libya.	As-Sa'iqa	Israeli–Palestinian conflict
November 23	Bombing	4	0	Marghera, Italy	Argo 16: A C-47 aircraft called the Argo 16 is bombed by unknown terrorists, killing all four people on board.	Unknown	
November 25	Hijacking	0	0	Iraq	KLM Flight 861: A hijacking by three Arabs demanding the release of seven Palestinian prisoners. The situation ended peacefully without casualties.	Arab Nationalist Youth Organization	Israeli–Palestinian conflict
December 14	Bombing	4	20	Marseille, France	Algerian consulate bombing in Marseille: The Algerian consulate was bombed by the anti-Arab Charles Martel Group. Four people were killed and another twenty were injured.	Charles Martel Group	
December 17–18	Hijacking, bombing	34	22	Rome, Italy	1973 Rome airport attacks and hijacking: On Pan Am Flight 110, 30 passengers were killed when Palestinian guerrillas threw phosphorus bombs aboard the aircraft as it prepared for departure. A Lufthansa plane was hijacked the same day by Palestinians, who killed 2 passengers.	Black September; PLO	Israeli–Palestinian conflict
December 18	Car bombing	0	60	London, United Kingdom	The Provisional IRA detonated a car bomb in Thorney Street, Westminster, London. 60 people were injured in the blast, six of whom had serious injuries.	Provisional IRA	The Troubles
December 20	Bombing, assassination	1		Madrid, Spain	Assassination of Luis Carrero Blanco: Prime Minister Admiral Luis Carrero Blanco was assassinated by ETA.	ETA	
December 27	Kidnapping, murder	1	0	Belfast, United Kingdom	German industrialist Thomas Niedermayer was kidnapped and killed by the Provisional Irish Republican Army. His body was not discovered until 1980.	Provisional Irish Republican Army	The Troubles

== See also ==
- List of terrorist incidents
