= List of terrorist incidents in 1985 =

This is a timeline of incidents in 1985 that have been labeled as "terrorism" and are not believed to have been carried out by a government or its forces (see state terrorism and state-sponsored terrorism).

== Guidelines ==
- To be included, entries must be notable (have a stand-alone article) and described by a consensus of reliable sources as "terrorism".
- List entries must comply with the guidelines outlined in the manual of style under MOS:TERRORIST.
- Casualty figures in this list are the total casualties of the incident including immediate casualties and later casualties (such as people who succumbed to their wounds long after the attacks occurred).
- Casualties listed are the victims. Perpetrator casualties are listed separately (e.g. x (+y) indicate that x victims and y perpetrators were killed/injured).
- Casualty totals may be underestimated or unavailable due to a lack of information. A figure with a plus (+) sign indicates that at least that many people have died (e.g. 10+ indicates that at least 10 people have died) – the actual toll could be considerably higher. A figure with a plus (+) sign may also indicate that over that number of people are victims.
- If casualty figures are 20 or more, they will be shown in **bold**. In addition, figures for casualties more than 50 will also be **underlined**.
- Incidents are limited to one per location per day. If multiple attacks occur in the same place on the same day, they will be merged into a single incident.
- In addition to the guidelines above, the table also includes the following categories:

0 people were killed/injured by the incident.
1–19 people were killed/injured by the incident.
20–49 people were killed/injured by the incident.
50–99 people were killed/injured by the incident.
100+ people were killed/injured by the incident.

== List ==
Date	Type	Dead	Injured	Location	Details	Perpetrator	Part of
20 January	Bombing	32	0	Sri Lanka	22 soldiers and 10 civilians are killed in a train explosion set off by the LTTE.	LTTE	Sri Lankan Civil War
21 January	Bombing	0	0	Magelang, Indonesia	Bombing of the Borobudur Buddhist temple in Central Java. Believed to have been carried out by Islamists in retaliation for the Tanjung Priok massacre	Islamists	
23 February	Bombing	1	18	Paris, France	A Marks & Spencer shop is bombed, killing one and wounding 18, attributed to pro-Iranian Lebanese Hezbollah.	Hezbollah	
February 7	Mortar	9	37	Newry, Northern Ireland	The Provisional IRA launches homemade mortar shells at an RUC base, killing nine police officers and wounding thirty-seven.	PIRA	The Troubles
8 March	Car bombing	80	175	Beirut, Lebanon	Car bomb explodes, killing 80, injuring 175; allegedly planned and executed by "rogue elements" of the Central Intelligence Agency.	CIA (alleged)	Lebanese Civil War
8 March	Bombing	0	18	Paris, France	The Cinema Rivoli is bombed while hosting a Jewish film festival, injuring 18	Hezbollah	
12 March	Shooting, bombing, hostage-taking	1	0	Ottawa, Ontario, Canada	Three Armenian Revolutionary Army militants storm the Turkish embassy, killing a security guard, blasting open the gate in front of the building with a bomb, and taking 12 people hostage before surrendering.	Armenian Revolutionary Army	
9 April	Suicide bombing	2 (+1 attacker)	0	Jezzine, Lebanon	A suicide car bomber drove an explosive-laden vehicle into an Israeli army patrol, killing 2 soldiers. This was the world's first female suicide bomber, at just 17 years old.	Syrian Social Nationalist Party	South Lebanon conflict (1985–2000)
12 April	Bombing	18	82	Madrid, Spain	Bombing of the El Descanso restaurant. American servicemen frequented the restaurant and were believed to have been the target. Islamic Jihad claimed responsibility.	Islamic Jihad	Lebanese Civil War
14 May	Massacre	146	85	Anuradhapura, Sri Lanka	LTTE gunmen shoot dead 146 Sinhalese civilians and injure 85 others as they were praying at Jaya Sri Maha Bodhi, a sacred Buddhist shrine.	LTTE	Sri Lankan Civil War
14 June	Hijacking	1	0	Athens, Greece	TWA Flight 847 hijacking, Hezbollah, see FBI Most Wanted Terrorists. Terrorists take passengers of an Athens-Rome flight hostage, murdering US Navy Seaman Robert Stethem.	Hezbollah	Lebanese Civil War
19 June	Shooting	12	0	San Salvador, El Salvador	Left-wing guerrillas opened fire on the Zona Rosa nightclub, killing 12 people including six Americans.	Revolutionary Party of Central American Workers	Salvadoran civil war
19 June	Bombing	3	74	Frankfurt am Main, West Germany	3 killed and 74 wounded at Frankfurt Airport by bomb. Police defuse second bomb.	Abu Nidal Organization	
20 June	Bombings	8	Several	Across Nepal	Bombs explode in several cities, including the capitol Kathmandu, as well as in Jhapa, Pokhara, Biratnagar, Janakpur, Birgunj, Mahendranagar, Nepalganj and at Bhairahawa Airport. Nepal Janabadi Morcha claimed responsibility.	Nepal Janabadi Morcha	
23 June	Bombing	2	4	Narita, Japan	A bomb intended for Air India Flight 301 explodes before being loaded on the plane. The bombing was committed by the same people who bombed Air India Flight 182 the same day.	Babbar Khalsa	Punjab insurgency
23 June	Bombing	329	0	Atlantic Ocean, Ireland	Air India Flight 182 is destroyed by a bomb en route from Montreal to Delhi. Canadian investigation determined the bomb had been planted by Sikh militants from the Babbar Khalsa and was in retaliation for Operation Blue Star	Babbar Khalsa	Punjab insurgency
28 June	Attack	15	Unknown	Quindío Department, Colombia	The M-19 attacks the town of Genoa and kills 8 policemen, 2 soldiers and 5 civilians.	M-19	Colombian conflict
1 July	Bombing, shooting	1	29	Madrid, Spain	Bombing at Trans World Airlines and British Airways offices, killing one woman and injuring 27. A follow-up submachine gun shooting and attempted grenade attacks on the Alia Royal Jordanian Airline office injured two. Linked to the Abu Nidal Organization.	Abu Nidal Organization	
22 July	Bombings	1	32	Copenhagen, Denmark	Two near-simultaneous bombs at the Jewish synagogue and at the offices of Northwest Orient, explode, killing one and injuring 32. The bombers are interrupted while placing a third, more powerful, bomb, which they later dispose of in the harbor. The bombs are later linked to Islamic Jihad.	Hezbollah	
1 August	Kidnapping	0	0	Mediterranean and Libya	A Belgian–French family is kidnapped from their yacht Silco in the Mediterranean and held in Libya for several years.	Abu Nidal Organization	Israeli–Palestinian conflict
23-24 September	Robberies, shootings	21 (+5 attackers)	11 (+2 attackers)	Lahad Datu, Malaysia	A group of Moro pirates raid the town and commit robberies and shootings.	Moro pirates	Moro attacks on Sabah
25 September	Shooting	4	1	Bayonne, France	4 members of the Spanish government backed death squad Grupos Antiterroristas de Liberación kill 4 ETA members and injured a civilian in an attack on a hotel bar.	GAL	Basque conflict
5 October	Mass shooting	8	4	Ras Burqa, Egypt	Egyptian soldier Suleiman Khater kills 7 Israeli tourists, including four children, and another Egyptian soldier in the beach resort town	Suleiman Khater	Israeli–Palestinian conflict
7 October – 10 October	Hijacking	1	0	Mediterranean	Achille Lauro hijacking: cruise ship hijacking by Palestinian Liberation Front, during which passenger Leon Klinghoffer, a 69-year-old wheelchair-using Jewish American citizen, is shot dead and thrown overboard.	PLF	Israeli–Palestinian conflict
20 October	Shooting	3	0	Armenia, Colombia	M-19 guerrillas attack the facilities of the Cisneros Battalion. Three soldiers die.	M-19	Colombian conflict
31 October	Bombing	0	28	Athens, Greece	An young Iraqi was carrying a bomb inside a bus, which exploded by accident and 28 students in the bus were injured.	Unknown	Unknown
November	Massacre	164+	Unknown	Toribío, Cauca, Colombia	The Tacueyó massacre occurred between November 1985 and January 1986 in the township of Tacueyó, where the guerrilla "Comando Ricardo Franco Frente-Sur" was attacked. The massacre was discovered on December 13, 1985, and was carried out by guerrillas Hernando Pizarro Leongómez and Jose Fedor Rey (alias Javier Delgado) alleging that the 164 guerrillas killed in their own group were, according to them, infiltrators or informers of the National Army of Colombia or the CIA.	Comando Ricardo Franco Frente-Sur	Colombian conflict
6 November	Siege, shootout	98	Several	Bogotá, Colombia	Palace of Justice siege. Members of the 19th of April Movement take over the Palace of Justice, the home of the Supreme Court of Colombia, in hopes of forcing a trial of President Belisario Betancur. 98 people were killed, including 35 militants, 48 soldiers and 11 of the 25 Supreme Court Justices.	M-19	Colombian conflict
23 November	Hijacking	58 (+2 attackers)	Several	Luqa, Malta	EgyptAir Flight 648 is hijacked en route from Athens to Cairo by three members of the Abu Nidal Organization. The flight is diverted to Luqa Airport where the militants engage in a standoff with the Egyptian military. The Egyptian military stages a raid in which 60 people, including 2 of the attackers, are killed.	Abu Nidal Organization	Israeli–Palestinian conflict
7 December	Bombings	0	43	Paris, France	Two bombs explode at the Galeries Lafayette and the Galerie Printemps, wounding 43 people. The attacks are claimed by the Hezbollah-affiliated Committee for Solidarity With Arab and Middle Eastern Political Prisoners (CSPPA).	CSPPA, Hezbollah	1985–86 Paris attacks
27 December	Shootings, grenade	19 (+4 attackers)	138 (+1 attacker)	Rome, Italy; Vienna, Austria	Four gunmen from the Abu Nidal Organization open fire on the El Al ticket counter at Leonardo da Vinci–Fiumicino Airport, killing 16 and wounding 99. Nearly simultaneously, three more gunmen attack Vienna International Airport, targeting passengers boarding a flight for Tel Aviv. Three people are killed and 39 injured. Four of the seven terrorists are also killed in the attacks.	Abu Nidal Organization	Israeli–Palestinian conflict

== See also ==
- List of terrorist incidents
