= Stage Club bombing =

2005 Palestinian suicide attack on a nightclub in Tel Aviv, Israel

- Part of the Second Intifada militancy campaign
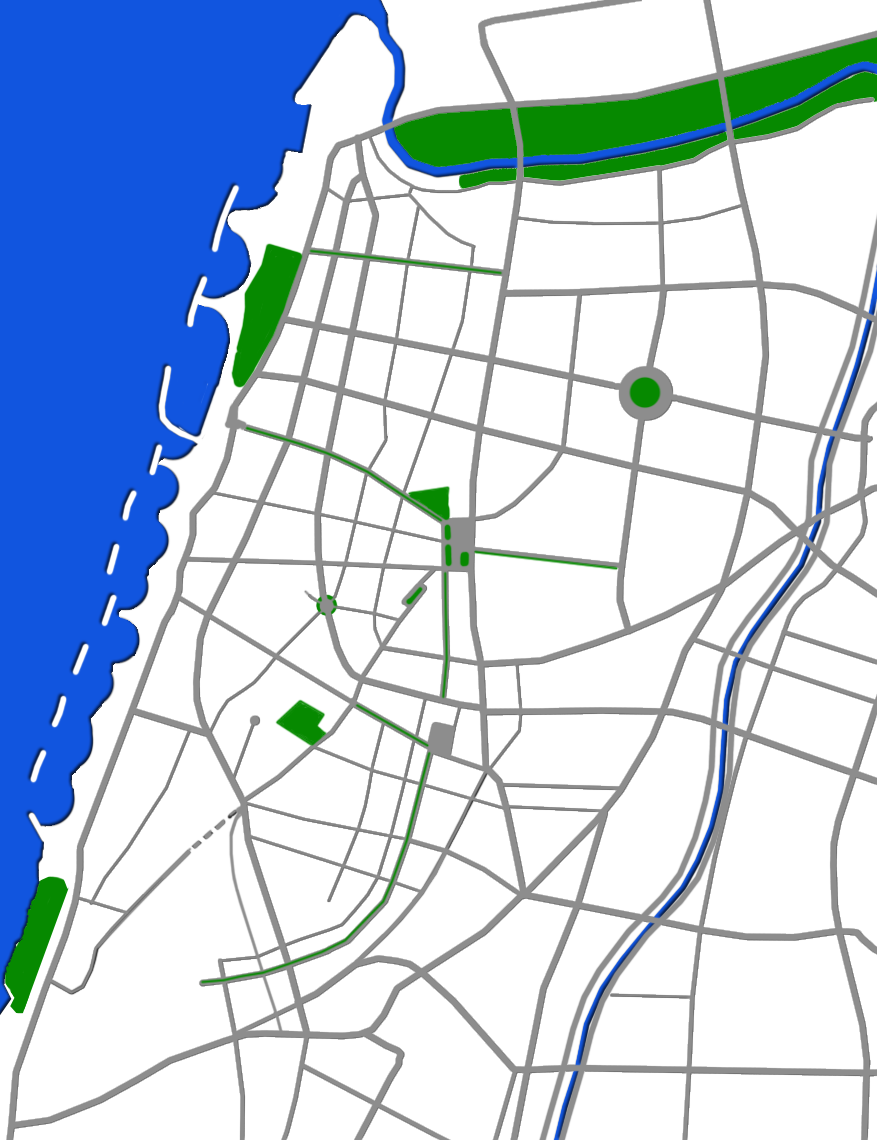
- Native name: הפיגוע במועדון הסטייג'
- Location: 32°04′23″N 34°45′54″E "Stage" nightclub in Tel Aviv, Israel
- Date: February 25, 2005; 21 years ago c. 11:30 pm (UTC+2)
- Attack type: Suicide bombing
- Weapon: 20 kilograms (44 lb) suicide vest
- Deaths: 5 Israeli civilians (+1 bomber)
- Injuries: 50+ Israeli civilians
- Perpetrator: Islamic Jihad claimed responsibility

The Stage Club bombing was a terrorist attack which occurred on February 25, 2005 in which a Palestinian suicide bomber blew himself up outside the "Stage" beachfront nightclub in Tel Aviv, Israel, killing 5 people and injuring over 50.

The Palestinian militant organization Islamic Jihad claimed responsibility for the attack.

== Attack ==
On Friday, February 25, 2005, at 11:30 pm, a Palestinian suicide bomber wearing hidden explosives attached to his body, detonated himself in a crowd of young Israelis who were waiting outside a beachfront nightclub near the promenade of Tel Aviv. This was on the corner of Herbert Samuel and Yonah Hanavi streets, opposite the Israeli beachfront. The blast killed five people and injured more than 50.

Most of the victims belonged to an Israeli army reserve unit that was planning to celebrate the birthday of one of its officers at the nightclub.

"We're a small and very 'together' unit," later said Yaron Greivsky, whose 30th birthday was the reason for the surprise gathering. "We're the kind who smile when we're called up for reserve service. All of us have been in dangerous places, we've been in Lebanon, Gaza, Hebron, all over. No one was ever hurt. And then a terrorist comes to the middle of Tel Aviv, where it's supposed to be the safest, and destroys everything."

As the nightclub was located in central Tel Aviv, emergency medical services arrived rapidly. Within 35 minutes, all casualties had been evacuated from the site. Four hospitals received the patients: Wolfson Medical Center, Sheba Medical Center, Sourasky Medical Center, and Beilinson Medical Center (part of Rabin Medical Center).

== Perpetrator ==
Abdullah Badran (1983-February 25, 2005) was the suicide bomber. Badran was a university student from the village of Deir al-Ghusun near the West Bank town of Tulkarm. His parents claimed he was a devout Muslim, but had no history of militant activity. Badran was twenty-one at the time of his death.

The Palestinian militant organization Islamic Jihad (PIJ) claimed responsibility for the attack. After the attack the Al-Jazeera network released a video in which Badran stating that he carried out the attack in revenge for Israel's actions in West Bank and the Gaza Strip. Israel Defense Minister Shaul Mofaz said that Syria, PIJ's backer, was ultimately responsible.

Palestinian Authority security officials, on orders from President Mahmoud Abbas, arrested three men with ties to PIJ in Tulkarem in the aftermath of the attack.
