= List of terrorist incidents in 1970 =

This is a timeline of incidents in 1970 that have been labelled as "terrorism" and are not believed to have been carried out by a government or its forces (see state terrorism and state-sponsored terrorism).

== Guidelines ==
- To be included, entries must be notable (have a stand-alone article) and described by a consensus of reliable sources as "terrorism".
- List entries must comply with the guidelines outlined in the manual of style under MOS:TERRORIST.
- Casualties figures in this list are the total casualties of the incident including immediate casualties and later casualties (such as people who succumbed to their wounds long after the attacks occurred).
- Casualties listed are the victims. Perpetrator casualties are listed separately (e.g. x (+y) indicate that x victims and y perpetrators were killed/injured).
- Casualty totals may be underestimated or unavailable due to a lack of information. A figure with a plus (+) sign indicates that at least that many people have died (e.g. 10+ indicates that at least 10 people have died) – the actual toll could be considerably higher. A figure with a plus (+) sign may also indicate that over that number of people are victims.
- If casualty figures are 20 or more, they will be shown in **bold**. In addition, figures for casualties more than 50 will also be **underlined**.
- Incidents are limited to one per location per day. If multiple attacks occur in the same place on the same day, they will be merged into a single incident.
- In addition to the guidelines above, the table also includes the following categories:

0 people were killed/injured by the incident.
1–19 people were killed/injured by the incident.
20–49 people were killed/injured by the incident.
50–99 people were killed/injured by the incident.
100+ people were killed/injured by the incident.

== List ==
Date	Type	Deaths	Injuries	Location	Details	Perpetrator	Part of
February 10	Shooting, grenade attacks	1	23	Munich, West Germany	1970 Munich bus attack: A bus carrying passengers to an El Al plane at the Munich-Riem Airport was attacked by militants.	DFLP	Israeli–Palestinian conflict
February 21	Bombing	47	0	Switzerland	A bomb exploded in the rear of Swissair Flight 330, causing it to crash near Zürich, killing 38 passengers and all 9 crew members.	PFLP-GC	Israeli–Palestinian conflict
March 6	Premature explosion	3	2	New York City, United States	Greenwich Village townhouse explosion: Three Weather Underground members Theodore Gold, Diana Oughton, Terry Robbins, are killed while preparing a bomb in a house in Greenwich Village. The bomb was to be used on Fort Dix. Two other Weathermen, Kathy Boudin and Cathy Wilkerson were injured in the explosion	Weather Underground	
March 31	Plane hijacking	0	0	Japan, South Korea, North Korea	Japan Airlines Flight 351, carrying 131 passengers and 7 crew from Tokyo to Fukuoka, was hijacked by nine members of the Japanese Red Army. 23 passengers were freed at Fukuoka Airport, mainly children or old aged. 108 passengers and all crew members with Red Army left Fukuoka, bound for Gimpo Airport in Seoul. Three days later, the hijackers asked to be flown to the North Korean capital Pyongyang, before leaving, 103 hostages were freed, and nine Red Army members surrendered to North Korean authorities.	Japanese Red Army	
April 21	Bombing	36	0	Philippines	Unknown		
May 22	Ambush	12	25	Avivim, Israel	Avivim school bus bombing: Two bazooka shells were fired at a school bus by, killing 12, including 8 children and wounding another 25.	PFLP-GC	Israeli–Palestinian conflict
June 1	Kidnapping, Assassination	1	0	Timote, Argentina	Former President Pedro Eugenio Aramburu was kidnapped and shot dead.	Montoneros	Dirty War
June 27	Riots	6	26	Belfast, Northern Ireland	Gun battle between Provisional IRA and Ulster Loyalists.	Provisional IRA and loyalist paramilitaries	The Troubles
July 22	Bombing	6	66	Gioia Tauro, Italy	Bomb attack on the train Palermo–Turin, near the Gioia Tauro railway station.	Unknown	
31 July–August 10	Kidnapping	1	0	Montevideo, Uruguay	Dan Mitrione, Chief Public Safety Adviser for USAID in Uruguay was kidnapped and murdered by militants. In the same day the group kidnapping the Brazilian consul Aloysio Dias Gomide, released on 21 February 1971 for ransom ($250,000).	Movimiento de Liberación Nacional-Tupamaros	
August 11	Bombing	2	0	Crossmaglen, Northern Ireland	1970 Crossmaglen bombing: Two members of the RUC were killed by a booby trap bomb	Provisional IRA	The Troubles
August 24	Bombing	1	3	Madison, Wisconsin, United States	Sterling Hall bombing The Army Mathematics Research Center on the University of Wisconsin–Madison campus was blown up.	Anti-Vietnam War protestors	
September 6	Plane hijacking	1 (perpetrator)	1	Zarqa, Jordan	Coordinated hijacking of four airliners. One hijacking was foiled in midair and two planes were diverted to Jordan's Dawson Field. Nicaraguan Sandinista hijacker Patrick Argüello was killed and all passengers were freed after negotiated release of captured hijacker Leila Khaled and three PFLP prisoners. The following day a fifth aircraft was also hijacked.	PFLP	Black September
October 5 – October 17	Kidnapping, murder	1	1 (kidnapped)	Quebec, Canada	Murder of Pierre Laporte, kidnapping of James Cross.	FLQ	October Crisis

== See also ==
- List of terrorist incidents
