= 1975 Orly Airport attacks =

1975 Islamic terrorist attack in Paris, France

- Location: Orly Airport, Paris, France
- Date: 13 and 19 January 1975
- Attack type: RPG attacks, shooting, grenade attacks, hostage-taking
- Deaths: 0
- Injuries: 23
- Perpetrator: Popular Front for the Liberation of Palestine

On 13 and 19 January 1975, an El Al aircraft at Orly Airport in Paris, France, was subject to attempted RPG attacks by leftist terrorists belonging to the Popular Front for the Liberation of Palestine (PFLP), led by Carlos the Jackal. Although the intended attacks failed, collateral damage was suffered, and the second attack resulted in gunfighting and a seventeen-hour hostage situation.

In the first attack, Carlos and Johannes Weinrich of the Revolutionary Cells fired two RPGs at an El Al aircraft, but missed and instead hit a Yugoslav plane and an administration building, injuring three people. Six days later, Carlos returned with three Palestinian terrorists, and another attempted RPG-attack on an El Al airplane was thwarted, resulting in a hostage situation and gunfights with police. Twenty people were wounded after grenades were thrown by the terrorists into the airport terminal. The terminal building was surrounded by hundreds of French riot police, and French Interior Minister Michel Poniatowski arrived at the scene and reportedly became involved in negotiating with the terrorists. After seventeen hours, the ten hostages including one child were released in return for the three remaining terrorists, excluding Carlos who had fled during the gunfight, being flown to Baghdad, Iraq.
