= 1978 Orly Airport attack =

1978 terrorist attack

- The attack site
- Location: 48.7233°N 2.3794°E; Orly Airport, Paris, France
- Date: 20 May 1978; 48 years ago c. 3:00 pm
- Attack type: Mass shooting
- Deaths: 2 civilians (+3 attackers)
- Injuries: 5
- Perpetrator: Palestinian nationalists

The 1978 Orly Airport attack was a shoot-out that took place on 20 May 1978 in the Paris Orly Airport, France as three terrorists armed with submachine guns opened fire at the El Al boarding gate. The terrorists were also reportedly carrying grenades and plastic explosives in the shoot-out that lasted for 25 minutes. Two people including one police officer were killed before the three terrorists were shot and killed by French police and Israeli security guards. Five people waiting to board a nearby Iberia flight to Malaga were wounded. The airport was evacuated for about three hours after the attack. According to Israeli sources the group behind the attack was a unit headed by Abu Nidal which cooperated with the Popular Front for the Liberation of Palestine (PFLP).
