= Palestinian support for Iraq during the Gulf War =

Palestinian involvement in the First Iraq War

Following the Iraqi invasion of Kuwait in August 1990, many Palestinians in the West Bank and Gaza adopted a pro-Iraq stance, while Yasser Arafat and the Palestinian Liberation Organisation adopted a more ambiguous stance that was widely perceived as pro-Iraq. Palestinian support for Iraq was motivated by a number of factors, including Iraqi president Saddam Hussein's linkage of the Gulf crisis with the Israeli occupation of Palestine, Hussein's anti-Israel posturing, frustrations over the stalled course of the First Intifada, and resentment towards the richer Gulf states.

The stance backfired significantly, as the Iraqi invasion and Palestinian support for the invasion received near unanimous international condemnation and Iraq was resoundingly and quickly defeated in the Gulf War. As a result, most Palestinians in Kuwait were expelled from the country, a socially and economically damaging six-week curfew was placed on the West Bank and Gaza by the Israeli military, the PLO's diplomatic standing was severely damaged, most Arab funding for the PLO was cut, and Palestinians lost much of the international sympathy they had gained in the previous three years due to the harsh Israeli responses to the Intifada. Philip Mattar of the Institute for Palestine Studies has described the Gulf War as "one of the worst setbacks for the Palestinians in modern times." Anthony Lewis of The New York Times wrote that "over many decades Palestinian nationalism has made crucial political mistakes. This may be the worst."

== Background ==
=== First Intifada ===
The First Intifada was a mass uprising by Palestinians against Israeli occupation that began in December 1987. During its early stages, the Intifada was largely non-violent, with actions including labour strikes, tax strikes, boycotts of Israeli goods, boycotts of Israeli institutions, demonstrations, the establishment of underground classrooms and cooperatives, raisings of the banned Palestinian flag, and civil disobedience. The Israeli government responded to the Intifada with a harsh crackdown, with Minister of Defence Yitzhak Rabin pledging to suppress it using "force, might, and beatings," including ordering Israeli soldiers to break the bones of Palestinian protestors, imposing widespread lockdowns on Palestinian cities, mass arrests, and demolitions of Palestinian houses. During the later stages of the Intifada, as the Israeli crackdown severely damaged the Palestinian economy and morale, as the Palestinian Liberation Organisation (PLO) leadership-in-exile wrestled to take on greater day-to-day control over the Intifada from the Unified National Leadership of the Uprising, and as extremist Islamist factions grew significantly, the uprising grew more violent during its last stages, including Palestinian internal political violence against rumoured collaborators.

=== Palestinians in Kuwait ===
In 1990, there was a major Palestinian community in Kuwait, with 400 000 Palestinians living in the country. This community represented the largest non-Kuwaiti population in Kuwait and the third largest community of the Palestinian diaspora in the world. This community would play an important role in Kuwait during the second half of the 20th century, particularly being overrepresented among schoolteachers in Kuwait. However, by the late 1980s, tensions between the Palestinian community in Kuwait and the Kuwaiti authorities had grown. Restrictive naturalisation laws meant that few Palestinians were able to gain Kuwaiti citizenship, even those who had been born in Kuwait, which significantly restricted education and employment opportunities for Palestinians. Following the early 1980s recession in Kuwait, the government had also adopted a Kuwaitisation policy, aiming to replace non-citizen workers with citizens, and cut funding to foreign aid initiatives, including an almost 50% cut to its support for the PLO.

=== Iraqi invasion of Kuwait ===
On 2 August 1990, Saddam Hussein's Iraq invaded Kuwait. The invasion provoked nearly unanimous international condemnation, culminating in United Nations Security Council Resolution 678 that gave the Iraqi government a final deadline of 15 January 1991 to withdraw its troops from Kuwait or face potential military intervention. After the Iraqi government failed to do so, a 42-state coalition began an aerial bombardment campaign against Iraqi forces on 17 January 1991. Later that day, the Iraqi government began firing missiles towards Israel in an attempt to provoke the Israeli government into joining the war, which it hoped would push Muslim-majority states to withdraw from the Coalition. Iraq would fire a total of 42 Scud missiles at Israel between 17 January and 23 February 1991, killing two civilians directly and up to 74 indirectly. Israel did not join the Coalition, and by the end of February 1991, Kuwait had been liberated.

== History ==
=== PLO stances and statements ===
According to journalists Jack Anderson and Dale Van Atta, the Iraqi invasion of Kuwait in early August 1990 caught PLO leader Yasser Arafat by surprise. At a meeting of Arab League foreign ministers on 3 August 1990, the PLO abstained from voting on the resolution condemning the Iraqi invasion but rejecting foreign intervention. On 4 August, the PLO abstained from voting on an Organisation of Islamic Cooperation resolution condemning the invasion. On 10 August, the PLO voted against a new Arab League foreign ministers resolution condemning the invasion that now included language calling for Gulf states' right to self-defence.

Several factions of the PLO did explicitly support the Iraqi invasion, including the Popular Front for the Liberation of Palestine. PFLP General Secretary George Habash called for "Arab masses and all its nationalist, democratic and progressive forces to resist the American invasion of the Arab region." In early September 1990, Habash made his first visit to Iraq in fourteen years to meet with Hussein. Muhammad Zaidan, leader of the minor Palestinian faction the Palestinian Liberation Front that was based in Iraq, also supported the Iraqi invasion, calling it "the day of the great victory" that would lead to "pan-Arab unity and awakening."

According to Philip Mattar of the Institute for Palestine Studies, by mid-August 1990, even though the PLO had not explicitly supported the Iraqi invasion, a perception had been created "throughout most of the world - including among Palestinians in the West Bank, Gaza Strip, and Jordan - that the PLO supported Saddam and opposed the international consensus." As a result, some prominent moderate members of the PLO began to issue statements on their own accord, including Salah Khalaf, who stated that "it is unacceptable to occupy others' territory by force" and claimed that the PLO would have supported a resolution calling for Iraqi withdrawal from Kuwait "had it not been condemnatory," and Faisal Husseini, who called for "the restoration of Kuwait's self-determination." On 14 August 1990, Youssef M. Ibrahim of The New York Times wrote that the PLO was "deeply divided over what policy to follow," with different parts and individuals of the organisation issuing statements that seemed contradictory of each other.

On 19 August, the PLO issued a statement claiming that it was the victim of a "ferocious political media campaign" that had been distorting its position on the crisis and that it was simply calling for a negotiated settlement. Later in August 1990, Arafat would give his first formal statement on the crisis, summarising the PLO's position as wishing to act as a mediator in the crisis, support of an Arab solution to the crisis without American involvement, and linking Iraqi withdrawal from Kuwait to Israeli withdrawal from Palestine, Syria, and Lebanon, as well as to Syrian withdrawal from Lebanon.

After a mid-October meeting with French Minister of Foreign Affairs Roland Dumas, Arafat claimed that foreign intervention against Iraq "would be a disaster for everyone," but stated that he was "optimistic, and I am continuing my efforts to bring about a peaceful solution within an Arab context with international collaboration."

In early January 1991, Arafat complained that the US was "asking Palestinians to open talks with their enemies, the Israelis," without being willing to open talks with Iraq, and called for the international community "to solve all the problems in the Gulf, in the Middle East." That month, Arafat visited Iraq to meet with Hussein. On 7 January, Arafat addressed a rally in Baghad, pledging that Palestine and Iraq would stand "together, side by side."

=== Support for Iraq in Palestine ===
There was widespread grassroots support for Iraq among the populations of Palestine. A number of small demonstrations were held in Palestinian cities following the Iraqi invasion in support of Iraq, and some Palestinians celebrated when Iraq began its Scud missile attacks against Israel in 1991. According to Helena Lindholm Schulz of the University of Gothenburg, "the atmosphere in the West Bank and Gaza during the Gulf War was one of feverish expectation." American political scientist and activist Norman Finkelstein wrote in 1992 that "few persons I met in Palestine even understood that cheering the Scud missiles was a "controversial" issue."

In late August 1990, Grand Mufti of Jerusalem Saad al-Alami called for Hussein to "get rid of the American army and its allies which are deployed on Saudi soil" and to "act to purify the places sacred to Islam in Mecca and Medina from the foreign invaders."

=== Support for Iraq among Arab citizens of Israel ===
Arab Democratic Party MK Abdulwahab Darawshe expressed support for the Iraqi invasion, saying in August 1990 that "British imperialism detached Kuwait from Iraq. We support the return of the historic rights."

== Causes ==
=== PLO strategic ambiguity ===
According to journalists Jack Anderson and Dale Van Atta, Arafat was "trying to resurrect his credibility with the White House and demonstrate that he can act as a peacemaker." According to Philip Mattar of the Institute for Palestine Studies, "Arafat is known to be a master of ambiguity, which allows him to appear to be all things to all people. His "yes/no" approach to politics and diplomacy had served him well in keeping disparate Palestinian groups together and in surviving the minefields of Arab politics. The PLO's position during the gulf crisis seems to be consistent with this approach." In October 1990, Time Magazine argued that, "as Arafat sees it, he is covering his bets. Whether there is war or peace, he reckons, the Palestinian issue will have to be addressed. Moreover, if a peaceful solution is found in the gulf, he figures he will share the credit as a mediator."

=== Iraqi military strength ===
American researcher Cheryl Rubenberg noted that, as the Soviet Union began its collapse in the late 1980s, the PLO was left "without the diplomatic support of a superpower," while relations with Hafez al-Assad's Syria were extremely poor, relations with Egypt and Jordan cool, and Arab states in the Gulf had begun to cut aid to the PLO during the 1980s, leaving a situation in which "only Iraq appeared to be a genuine ally."

According to Helena Lindholm Schulz of the University of Gothenburg, "the Scud missiles fired by Iraq represented a flexing of muscles; it was perceived as though an Arab state was finally threatening the air power of Israel." According to Ann Mosely Lesch of Villanova University, Hussein's "threats appeared credible because he controlled a powerful battle-hardened army that had already used missiles and chemical weapons in war."

=== Potential for peace negotiations ===
According to Greg Philo and Mike Berry, Palestinian support for the Iraqi invasion was prompted by "the Iraqi dictator's attempt to make a ‘linkage’ between Iraqi withdrawal from Kuwait and Israeli withdrawal from the occupied territories, and because he struck at the Israeli state with scud missiles." Roger Heacock of Birzeit University has argued that the Iraqi invasion was initially perceived by some Palestinians as mere geopolitical manoeuvering rather than a serious crisis, and that, to Palestinians, "the United States seemed to betray expansionist designs by immediately intervening on the military, political and diplomatic levels, leaving little room for dialogue with Baghdad." According to Heacock, this initially generated anti-American sentiment among Palestinians, which then became outright pro-Iraq sentiment after Hussein made a high-profile speech on 12 August 1990 in which he indicated that any Iraqi withdrawal from Kuwait would be conditional on an Israeli withdrawal from Palestine.

Jerome Segal of the University of Maryland, College Park that Palestinian support for Iraq emerged in part from the failure of the American government to press for peace talks and to recognise a Palestinian state following the Palestinian Declaration of Independence in November 1988, in which the PLO accepted a two-state solution for the first time, thus discouraging Palestinian moderates. According to Ann Lesch and Joe Stork of the Middle East Research and Information Project, "Palestinians had watched their peace initiative being frittered away when Israeli Prime Minister Yitzhak Shamir blocked even preliminary Israeli-Palestinian meetings. The PLO-US dialogue, initiated in December 1988, lacked substance. Saddam seemed to offer the tough backing essential for negotiations." According to Norman Finkelstein, "most Palestinians are convinced that Israel only understands force. It will negotiate peace only when it must reckon with the consequences of not negotiating peace."

=== Stalemate of the First Intifada ===
Palestinian historian Mustafa Kabha has argued that, by 1990, the First Intifada had been bought "to a dead end." According to Roger Heacock of Birzeit University, "the key factor present within Palestinian public opinion in the summer of 1990 was frustration," with Hussein perceived as someone strong enough to secure Palestinian independence as the First Intifada faltered, Israeli settlement in the occupied territories continued to increase, and the most right-wing government in Israeli history at that point was formed in June 1990. Palestinian scholar Hanan Ashrawi stated that "promised the Palestinians, who had lost hope, the faint possibility of liberation. Many knew it would not work. But if they dreamed of an Arab liberator on a white horse, if, in their despair, in the absence of any semblance of a peace process, they clung to this reed, can you really blame them?"

Boaz Evron of Yedioth Ahronoth wrote that "With the intifada going nowhere, the U.S. 'dialogue' with the PLO a waste of time, and the world standing idly by-naturally, you grasp at every straw, even if the straw is actually poisoned bait... The enthusiasm for Saddam is really the frustration with America, with Europe, and with the Israeli left - with all of us who failed to draw back the occupation regime even one inch." Gil Sedan of the Jewish Telegraphic Agency wrote in August 1990 that Israeli analysts mostly saw support for Iraq among Arab citizens of Israel as emerging from political manoeurvering, with Palestinian political figures taking tougher stances against Israel to try and outflank rising Islamist factions, and from disllusionment with the Israeli left as no political solution to the Israeli-Palestinian conflict appeared as distant as ever. Sedan also noted that some Israeli analysts believed that Palestinians cared more about destroying Israel than establishing an independent Palestinian nation-state. Don Peretz of Binghamton University wrote that Palestinian moderates had been "losing control to militants unwilling or unable to calculate the possible impact on the Palestinian community of armed resistance" by 1990 as a result of the stalling of the Intifada, noting that the Unified National Leadership of the Uprising had become unable to consistently enforce its orders against the killings of rumoured collaborators.

=== Israeli policies during the Gulf War ===
According to American political scientist and activist Norman Finkelstein, some Palestinians within the occupied territories turned towards supporting Iraq's missile attacks on Israel during the war as a result of the Israeli policies towards the occupied territories during the war, particularly that the Israeli government imposed a harsh lockdown on the territories and that the government distributed gas masks to all settlers within the territories but refused to distribute gas masks to Palestinian residents.

=== Anti-Americanism ===
Palestinian politician Nabil Shaath stated that there was "a deep resentment of the United States support of Israel accumulated over four decades" among Palestinians. According to Marwan Darweish and Andrew Rigby, the perception of Hussein was that "here was a man who refused to be intimidated by American power and hence restored some sense of pride to the Arab nation."

According to Ann Mosely Lesch of Villanova University, Palestinians held a belief that "Washington maintained a double standard," noting an April 1990 non-binding resolution of the American congress supporting recognition of Jerusalem as the capital of Israel, the American veto against United Nations Security Council resolutions condemning the Israeli government's use of force against Palestinian demonstrations during the Intifada, and the American's withdrawal from negotiations with the PLO following a beach raid in May 1990 by the Palestinian Liberation Front, a minor Palestinian faction. The Washington Post reported in August 1990 that Arafat's aides claimed that Arafat "has sucked up to the U.S. for 18 months and had nothing to show for it," citing in particular that he was denied the chance to directly meet and negotiate with senior American officials after the Palestinian Declaration of Independence in November 1988 and comparing him to Nelson Mandela, who was invited to meet George H.W. Bush shortly after his release from prison.

=== Resentment against Gulf states ===
According to Ann Mosely Lesch of Villanova University, "Saddam touched the chord of widespread resentment toward the oil-rich states in the Arabian peninsula," saying that Hussein presented a narrative that "the current rulers in the Gulf were willing brokers and satellites of the West, and that the Gulf states purposely withheld assistance from indebted Arab people." Palestinian political scientist and former Palestinian National Council member Asad Abdul Rahman stated that Hussein "managed to market himself as the Robin Hood who was going to redistribute Arab wealth." According to Ann Lesch and Joe Stork of the Middle East Research and Information Project, "An Arab approach to peace, Iraq maintained, must be coupled with a pan-Arab military and material build-up. Oil revenues must be invested in the Arab world rather than abroad; wealthy Arab governments must aid poor ones, and special pan-Arab funds should be set up to help the Palestinian intifada."

=== Historical Palestine–Iraq relations ===
According to Toufic Haddad of the Palestine Chronicle, "many Palestinians did have a pre-existent sympathy towards Iraq irrespective of the question of its conflict with Kuwait. Iraq is remembered in Palestinian popular consciousness as one of the Arab states to have fought against Zionist armies in 1948 and 1967, doing so valiantly, unlike other states such as Jordan which made secret arrangements with Zionist forces before 1948 to divide Palestine between itself and the future Israel. Iraq was also the only warring Arab state that did not sign an armistice agreement in the wake of the Nakba." According to Ann Lesch and Joe Stork of the Middle East Research and Information Project, "PLO had been feeling physically and politically insecure in Tunis since the Israeli air raid in October 1985 and the assassination of Abu Jihad in April 1988, and had moved substantial sections of its administrative and military operations to Baghdad."

However, Roger Heacock, an American professor at Birzeit University during the Gulf War, has argued that "prior to his speech of 12 August 1990, Saddam Hussein was not considered a model by the Palestinians," pointing to divided opinions among Palestinians about Iran–Iraq War during the 1980s.

== Palestinian collaboration with and resistance to the Iraqi invasion in Kuwait ==
According to Caryle Murphy of The Washington Post, "most Palestinians [in Kuwait] remained neutral, publicly at least. There were, for example, no street demonstrations by Palestinians in Kuwait to show support for Baghdad, despite reported Iraqi efforts to organize them." By mid-November 1990, almost half of the Palestinian community in Kuwait had left the country. Many Palestinians who remained within the country and worked in essential services like healthcare did not participate in the general strike called for by the Kuwaiti resistance.

Most Palestinians in Kuwait who actively collaborated with the Iraqi occupation were Ba'athists. The Iraqi government arranged for several hundred armed members of Ba'athist minor Palestinian factions to deploy to Kuwait during the occupation, including the Arab Liberation Front, the Palestinian Liberation Front, and the Palestine Liberation Army. Those members were used by the Iraqi military to police the Palestinian community in Kuwait and to repress Palestinians who opposed the occupation. The General Union of Palestinian Teachers wrote a letter to Hussein applauding the invasion.

On 5 August 1990, the local branch of the PLO organised a demonstration in the Hawally district opposing the invasion. The leader of the Kuwaiti branch of Fatah, Rafik Qiblawi, was assassinated in January 1991 by Iraq. Some Palestinians in Kuwait sheltered members of the Kuwaiti resistance, and some actively fought with the resistance. The Iraqi military largely refused to distribute weapons to Palestinians in Kuwait, despite PLO requests, out of concerns of their involvement with the Kuwaiti resistance.

== Reactions ==
=== Palestinian criticism of Iraq ===
On 14 January 1991, the second most senior official within the PLO, Salah Khalaf, was assassinated by the Abu Nidal Organization, a minor extremist and anti-PLO Palestinian faction. While the immediate cause of the assassination was Khalaf's role in PLO operations against the Abu Nidal Organisation, there has been widespread speculation that the assassination was ordered by Hussein over Khalaf's opposition to Arafat's stance on the Gulf War. Several days before his assassination, Khalaf had told journalists that "I don't want my own cause associated with the destruction of the Arab region" and accused Hussein of ignoring PLO attempts at resolving the crisis peacefully.

Palestinian-American intellectural Edward Said wrote that "this is a matter of principle. Invasion is invasion," and that "I was very disappointed when Palestinians on the West Bank and Gaza identified with Iraq bashing the Kuwaitis. Even if the Kuwaitis are arrogant, why would a victim identify with the oppressor?" Palestinian historian Walid Khalidi wrote that "the principles violated by Saddam in his invasion of Kuwait were the very principles from which the Palestinian cause drew its moral strength. The 'terrorist' image that Arafat was so desperate to shed was only reconfirmed by a close association with Saddam."

=== In Kuwait ===
In September 1990, the Kuwait News Agency quoted a Kuwaiti government spokesperson as saying that "Kuwait was awaiting from PLO officials a moral and principled stand rejecting the Iraqi invasion and condemning the killings, lootings and rapes by Iraqi occupation troops there," but that instead the PLO leadership "overpasses reality with lies and fabricated claims." Kuwaiti diplomant and General Secretary of the Gulf Cooperation Council Abdullah Bishara stated that the PLO had " no right to turn their back on the legitimacy of our existence when they themselves depend on the legitimacy of their cause to get world sympathy. We don't accept any apologies from Mr. Arafat... We have always backed them diplomatically and financially. They floated because of our support and now they turn their backs on us when our very independence is threatened."

=== Internationally ===
Israeli Prime Minister Yitzhak Shamir rejected attempts to link the Iraqi invasion with the Israeli occupation of Palestine, saying that "We have been asked more than once to withdraw from these territories and other areas in Israel and refused. We will continue to do so in the future." Israeli Minister of Foreign Affairs David Levy stated that the PLO's support for the invasion "exposed the real face of Arafat and showed the world that he is still supporting terrorism and that he cannot be a partner in peace negotiations." Former Mapam MK Elazar Granot stated that "the PLO has cast a giant question mark over the prospect of its ever representing the Palestinian people in the future." Shinui leader Amnon Rubinstein accused the PLO of "supporting a brutal, unscrupulous tyrant" and described its position as "political idiocy." Independent MK David Zucker called the PLO's stance "a major, major mistake, maybe a historic mistake."

American officials rejected the PLO's calls to tie negotiations over Kuwait with the Israeli occupation of Palestine. American president George H. W. Bush stated in September 1990 that the Iraqi occupation of Kuwait should be dealt with "without trying to tie it into some other unresolved dispute," describing calls to link the conflicts as "an effort to dilute the resolutions of the United Nations." In January 1991, Bush repeated that "there will be no linkage on these two questions," with United States Secretary of State James Baker saying that "we will not agree to anything that would constitute linkage of the Kuwait-Iraq problem to other problems."

British Foreign Secretary Douglas Hurd described Arafat's support for Iraq as a "serious mistake." Italian Minister of Foreign Affairs Gianni De Michelis stated that "the European Community will have to make a re-evaluation of its attitude" towards the PLO. Australian Prime Minister Bob Hawke argued that "the leadership of the PLO, by its support of Saddam Hussein, has gravely damaged its credibility internationally."

Some international figures, however, did suggest some support for linking the occupation of Kuwait with the occupation of Palestine. Former American president Jimmy Carter argued in The New York Times that "there is no way to separate the crisis in the Gulf from the Israeli-Palestinian question," claiming that even if the Iraqi occupation was defeated through war, "even greater pressure will emerge within the international community to convene a peace conference" on the Israeli-Palestinian conflict. In his Christmas 1990 message, Pope John Paul II stated that "the light of Christ is with the tormented nations of the Middle East," saying that "The Holy Land too has been awaiting this peace for years: a peaceful solution to the whole question which concerns it, a solution which takes into account the legitimate aspirations of the Palestinian people and of the people which lives in the State of Israel." While supporting international action against Iraq, Soviet leader Mikhail Gorbachev stated that "there is a link here, because failure to find a solution in the Middle East at large also has a bearing on the conflict."

== Impact ==
=== Gulf War curfew in Palestine ===
During the Gulf War, the Israeli government imposed an almost two-month-long curfew on Palestinian residents of the Gaza Strip and the West Bank, confining them to their houses around-the-clock. The Israeli government justified the curfew by pointing towards Palestinian support for Iraq, saying that the measure was necessary to prevent Palestinians from launching attacks in support of Iraq. The curfew was the longest imposed on the Palestine by the Israeli government since the start of the Israeli occupation in 1967.

The curfew had a significantly negative effect on social and economic conditions within Palestine. According to Don Peretz of Binghamton University, the curfew "brought the entire economy virtually to a halt."

The curfew was largely followed without resistance by Palestinians, leading to an effective halt to the First Intifada in early 1991.

=== Decline of Palestine-Kuwait relations ===
The PLO's support for Iraq severely damaged Kuwait–Palestine relations and the standing of the Palestinian community in Kuwait. Following the liberation of Kuwait, most of the remaining Palestinians inside the country were either expelled by the Kuwaiti government or fled out of fear of reprisals.

In July 1991, The Los Angeles Times quoted a senior Kuwaiti official as calling for Palestinians to "be relegated to the forgotten," saying that "every one of them is a ticking time bomb."

=== Internal Palestinian politics ===
According to Judith Miller of The New York Times, the war "widened divisions among Palestinians, splitting them openly for the first time, not just ideologically but geographically and economically," and "deepened the despair of Palestinians -- everywhere."

The failure of the PLO's stance on the invasion damaged its standing in Palestinian politics following Iraq's resounding defeat. According to Judith Miller of The New York Times, the war saw "the worst discord in P.L.O. ranks in years," but that despite mounting criticism of Arafat's leadership of the PLO, "there is no serious effort to replace him, largely because there are no plausible alternatives." As a result of cuts to its funding, the PLO was forced to close a significant number of its offices and to institute cuts to many of its welfare programmes inside the occupied territories. Fatah co-founder and moderate Hani al-Hassan told The Los Angeles Times in July 1991 that "after all that has happened, I am feeling humiliated."

The PLO's stance on the war benefitted the recently founded and quickly growing Islamist nationalist and anti-PLO group Hamas. According to Palestinian historian Mustafa Kabha, "the sanctions against the PLO, enforced by halting Gulf state support, did not apply to Hamas, which declared that Iraq must withdraw from Kuwait. The funds filling Hamas coffers sustained the expedited process of building institutions, founding a political bureau, and establishing a military branch called Regiments of 'Izz al-Din al-Qassam.'" As well as having funds redirected towards it, Hamas also moved to take advantage of the growing disillusionment among Palestinians, with The New York Times quoting one Palestinian analyst in July 1991 as saying that "The P.L.O. still represents the Palestinians politically, but Hamas increasingly reflects their despair."

=== International politics ===
According to Australian researcher Ian Bickerton, the PLO's support for Iraq "undermined and discredited PLO diplomatic efforts." According to Palestinian historian Mustafa Kabha, the damage caused by the PLO's support for Iraq during the Gulf War helped push the PLO towards endorsing the US-organised Madrid Conference of 1991.

According to Youssef M. Ibrahim of The New York Times, following the liberation of Kuwait, "Virtually all of the key Arab countries, including moderates such as Saudi Arabia and Egypt as well as militants such as Syria, appear to have decided they will not do business with him. Even old friends like Jordan and Algeria are now distancing themselves from Mr. Arafat and his associates." According to former Egyptian government minister Ismail Sabri Abdullah, "Egyptians by and large trusted Arafat. Now Egyptians blame him. They don't understand his attitude." The government of Qatar expelled most Palestinians living inside the country, while Saudi Arabia moved to fire Palestinians working for its ministry of defence.

As well as undermining international diplomatic support for Palestine, the support for Iraq also had the effect of undermining popular sympathies for Palestinians among international audiences that had been built up as a result of the Israeli crackdown on the First Intifada over the previous three years. Reuters journalist Robert Mahoney wrote in late January 1991 that "TV pictures of Israeli soldiers firing at Palestinians have been replaced by harrowing footage of Tel Aviv residents being pulled from the debris after an Iraqi attack... Virtually the only news reported from the occupied territories has been the shouts of triumph by Palestinians each time a Scud has crashed into Israel." According to Joel Brinkley of The New York Times, "Not since the Yom Kippur War nearly 18 years ago, in fact, has the world looked so warmly on [Israel], seeing it once again as a victim -- a sharp contrast to the portrayal during the first years of the Palestinian uprising."

Palestinian support for Iraq also damaged the Israeli peace movement. According to Don Peretz of Binghamton University, Iraq's missile attacks and Palestinian support for the attacks "helped undermine the progress that had been made during the past few years in changing Israeli perceptions of the Palestinians," noting that the most prominent Israeli peace group, Peace Now, supported the Coalition's intervention against Iraq.

== Aftermath ==
In 2001, Faisal Husseini made the first formal visit to Kuwait by a Palestinian Authority official since the Gulf War. Yasser Arafat died in November 2004. The next month, Arafat's successor as Chairman of the Palestine Liberation Organization, Mahmoud Abbas, issued a formal apology to Kuwait for the PLO's support of the Iraqi invasion. In 2013, the Embassy of Palestine, Kuwait City was re-opened for the first time since the Gulf War, with the new Palestinian Ambassador Rami Tahboub stating that "I don't think we'll ever get back to before 1990, but the relations will continue to improve to the best of both people."

During an interview, Hassan Asfour, a Palestinian minister and negotiator, firmly rejected any suggestion that Yasser Arafat or the official Palestinian leadership had supported Iraq's invasion of Kuwait. As supporting evidence, he asserted that Abu Ammar and Abu Iyad had counselled Saddam Hussein that the invasion constituted a significant trap for Iraq. Asfour added that Abu Iyad "paid with his life for the way he spoke," at the hands of one of the Palestinian proxies associated with Iraq, namely the Abu Nidal Organization. He charged the Americans with promoting this "big lie" for the purpose of imposing their blockade.

== See also ==
- Iraq–Palestine relations
