= Gulf War curfew in Palestine =

From January to March 1991, the Israeli government imposed an around-the-clock curfew on Israeli-occupied Palestine. Occurring during the First Intifada, the Israeli government justified the curfew as necessary to prevent outbreaks of unrest and militant attacks linked to Palestinian support for Iraq in the Gulf War. The curfew was the longest and most extensive curfew imposed on Palestine since the start of the Israeli occupation in 1967.

== Background ==
The First Intifada was a mass uprising by Palestinians against Israeli occupation that began in December 1987. During its early stages, the Intifada was largely non-violent, with actions including labour strikes, tax strikes, boycotts of Israeli goods, boycotts of Israeli institutions, demonstrations, the establishment of underground classrooms and cooperatives, raisings of the banned Palestinian flag, and civil disobedience. The Israeli government responded to the Intifada with a harsh crackdown, with Minister of Defence Yitzhak Rabin pledging to suppress it using "force, might, and beatings," including ordering Israeli soldiers to break the bones of Palestinian protestors, imposing widespread lockdowns on Palestinian cities, mass arrests, and demolitions of Palestinian houses. During the later stages of the Intifada, as the Israeli crackdown severely damaged the Palestinian economy and morale, as the Palestinian Liberation Organisation (PLO) leadership-in-exile wrestled to take on greater day-to-day control over the Intifada from the Unified National Leadership of the Uprising, and as extremist Islamist factions grew significantly, the uprising grew more violent during its last stages, including Palestinian internal political violence against rumoured collaborators.

In August 1990, Saddam Hussein's Iraq invaded Kuwait. The invasion provoked nearly unanimous international condemnation; the PLO, however, declared its support for Iraq, partially out of hope that Iraq would be a powerful ally against Israel and that Hussein would tie any settlement of the occupation of Kuwait to the Israeli occupation of Palestine. United Nations Security Council Resolution 678 had given the Iraqi government a final deadline of 15 January 1991 to withdraw its troops from Kuwait or face potential military intervention. After the Iraqi government failed to do so, a 42-state coalition began an aerial bombardment campaign against Iraqi forces on 17 January. Later that day, the Iraqi government began firing missiles towards Israel in an attempt to provoke the Israeli government into joining the war, which it hoped would push Muslim-majority states to withdraw from the Coalition. Iraq would fire a total of 42 Scud missiles at Israel between 17 January and 23 February 1991, killing two civilians directly and up to 74 indirectly. Israel did not join the Coalition, and by the end of February, Kuwait had been liberated.

== Events ==
=== Prelude ===
The first two weeks of 1991 has seen several temporary curfews imposed on Israeli-occupied Palestine by the Israeli government. A 24-hour curfew had been imposed on 1 January, to prevent demonstrations celebrating the 26th anniversary of the start of Fatah's guerilla campaign against Israel. Four Palestinians were killed by Israeli forces after breaking the curfew. Another curfew had been imposed on 14 January, following an outbreak of rioting in Palestine. The riots had been triggered by the hardline Abu Nidal Organization's assassination of three senior Fatah officials on 14 January: Salah Khalaf, the second most senior Fatah official, Fatah security chief Hayel Abdul Hamid, and Fakhri Al Omari, one of Khalaf's aides. In response to the riots, Israeli forces shot and killed three teenage rioters and declated the Gaza Strip a closed military zone.

=== Imposition of the curfew ===
On 16 January 1991, as the deadline for the Iraqi withdrawal passed without any withdrawal, the Israeli government declared a state of emergency, placing the Israel Defence Forces on high alert and temprorarily closing down schools. Simultaneously, the Israeli government imposed an indefinite full-day curfew on Palestinian residents of the Gaza Strip, confining them to their homes around-the-clock. The next day, as the Gulf War began, the government extended the curfew to the Palestinian residents of the West Bank. The curfew did not apply to Israeli settlers living in the Israeli-occupied Palestine.

The Israeli government justified the curfew as necessary due to Palestinian support for Hussein, to prevent Palestinian militants within the occupied territories from launching attacks against Israel and to prevent any large outbreaks of unrest while Israel was under a state of emergency.

The curfew was imposed under Article 89 of Israeli Military Order No. 378.

=== Initial curfew ===
During the curfew, Israeli soldiers patrolling the occupied territories mounted loudspeakers on their vehicles and broadcast warnings to Palestinians not to leave their homes. Journalists were forbidden from entering the occupied Palestinian territories without an Israeli military escort during the curfew.

The vast majority of Palestinians obeyed the curfew peacefully, with relatively few incidents of Palestinians breaking the curfew being reported. On 19 January, a 24-year-old Palestinian woman in Nablus was shot and killed by Israeli soldiers. The woman had violated the curfew by stepping out onto her balcony while feeding her baby. On 6 February, the Unified National Leadership of the Uprising called for a non-violent at-home protest against the curfew, consisting of "a collective 15-minute period of banging pots and pans, singing the national anthem, chanting nationalist slogans, and whistling."

In most areas, the Israeli government temporarily lifted the curfew for small periods of time once every few days to allow for Palestinians in those areas to purchase supplies. On 20 January, the Israeli government lifted the curfew for two hours. In Bethlehem that day, a group of youth attempted to take advantage of those two hours to organise a demonstration, but were dispersed by Israeli forces using tear gas.

The Israeli government gradually began to lift the curfew on 18 February.

=== Re-imposition of the curfew ===
As the ground campaign in the Gulf War began on 24 February, the Israeli government re-imposed the curfew on the Palestinian territories. The decision to re-impose the curfew was made within minutes of the Israeli government being informed by the American government that the offensive against Hussein's forces had begun.

Despite the end of war by the end of February, the Israeli government did not immediately lift the curfew.

== Effects ==
=== Nutrition ===
The curfew had a significantly negative effect on nutrition in Palestine.

While the Israeli government did temporarily lift the curfew at times and did issue permits to some essential workers to continue working during the curfew, the curfew still had a significant impact on Palestinian supply chains. In particular, uneven lifting of the curfew led to frequent localised shortages in supplies, as supplies could not be transported to opened areas from closed areas. Supply chains were also affected by harassment of Palestinians transporting supplies at Israeli military checkpoints.

During the curfew, the United Nations Relief and Works Agency for Palestine Refugees in the Near East (UNRWA) played a significant role in providing food aid to Palestinians.

The Israeli government denied that the curfew caused significant malnutrition among Palestinians, with a spokesperson telling The New York Times Magazine that "there were cash flow problems -- largely from the absence of funds from Kuwait -- but never any starvation."

=== Economic ===
The curfew had significantly negative effects on the Palestinian economy. The curfew had a significant effect on Palestinians who worked in non-essential jobs, as they were unable to work and earn a salary. Many Palestinians also saw significant hits to their savings, leaving poorer Palestinians impoverished. According to Don Peretz of Binghamton University, "brought the entire economy virtually to a halt. Farmers had been unable to water, harvest, or market their crops, and most business in the territories had ceased. Even though forty-six factories were permitted to continue operations, they too lost money. Nearly all currency transfers from Palestinians who had worked in Israel or the Gulf ended. Although food prices in centers such as Jericho and Nablus fell, the market declined because so few customers had money for purchases. Economists calculated that the territories were working at only 25 percent capacity by the time the war ended and the curfew was lifted."

As Palestinians were unable to travel into Israel during the curfew, sectors of the Israeli economy that depended on Palestinian labour, notably construction, were also severely affected. Many of those Palestinians permanently lost their jobs as a result of the curfew, being replaced by Soviet Jews who had recently immigrated. Few of the Palestinians working in Israel who were fired during the curfew were paid severance pay, despite being legally entitled to it.

=== Health and medical ===
Mohammed Moussa Abu Lehia, a senior doctor in the Jabalia refugee camp told The New York Times Magazine that "I saw illness I had rarely seen here. We saw diseases of developed societies -- hypertension and depression, triggered by anxiety over the war and the restrictions -- and the ills of the poor, such as scurvy, malnutrition." According to Human Rights Watch, those needing healthcare during the curfew "must find a means of leaving home to reach a clinic or hospital. Those with telephones can call for ambulances, which have in general not been obstructed during this curfew. But those without phones must contact a neighbor or walk out of their homes and try to talk their way past soldiers... Non-acute health care has been hit the hardest. Preventive treatment has all but stopped, and people have resorted increasingly to consulting with doctors by phone in lieu of traveling to their offices."

=== Children and youth ===
According to Jill Hamburg and Jonathan Ferziger of United Press International, "children on both sides show the same signs of trauma from Iraqi missile attacks. Both Israeli and Palestinian children wet their beds, both refuse to finish meals and both cry in the middle of the night because of scary dreams, parents in Israel and the Israeli-occupied West Bank say. But besides the individual love and attention each family tries to offer their children at home, the Israelis have activated legions of child psychologists at schools and on television to confront children's fears as only a media-savvy Western country can do well... Palestinian parents on the other hand, confined to their homes by a monthlong army-imposed curfew, have tried to deal with their children's fears mostly in simple, time-honored ways -- a kiss, a hug and a few tender words."

As Palestinian schools were closed during the curfew and the Christmas holiday break had taken place in late-December, most Palestinian children spent the period from mid-December 1990 through March 1991 without schooling.

=== Palestinian support for Iraq ===
Despite the curfew and heavy Iraqi losses in the Coalition aerial campaign, some Palestinians initially continued to express support for Iraq. The Washington Post on 20 January quoted one 15-year-old Palestinian boy as saying that "It's wonderful that missiles hit Tel Aviv. At last Israelis are feeling something like we feel with their army here," while quoting Palestinian academic Hanan Ashrawi as saying that "The war has increased support for Saddam tremendously. People now see him as an underdog, or as some almost mythical figure from Arab culture and history: the man who says, 'I will die fighting, but I will maintain my pride and dignity.' And who do they have to compare him with? By contrast, the other Arab leaders appear to be subservient to the West, trying to save themselves." Local PLO leadership in Palestine, however, attempted to distance themselves from the PLO's support of Hussein, with Mayor of Bethlehem Elias Freij stating that "The missile attack on Israel is an escalation, and every time there is an escalation of the situation, the Palestinians suffer."

By the later stages of the curfew, as the effects of the curfew accumulated and Hussein stopped linking any negotiations over the war with the Israeli occupation of Palestine, doubts began to grow among Palestinians over the results of the PLO's support for Iraq. One local PLO activist quoted by The Washington Post on 24 February stated that "frankly in my opinion the Palestinians lost a lot. We lost almost everything that was gained in three years.The PLO should have been more cautious and should have played the game better than they played it. Now we are going to pay for our support for the PLO and for Iraq," while quoting an East Jerusalem merchant as saying that "What a fool Yasser Arafat has been. Always Arab leaders have promised to defend the Palestinians, and always they have betrayed us. Surely Arafat could have anticipated this, and kept some distance from Saddam. Now the whole world will blame us for crimes for which we are not responsible."

According to Judith Miller of The New York Times Magazine, "the Palestinians' open and enthusiastic support for Iraq turned the Israeli public -- even the doves -- against them, undermined their cause in the eyes of the world and added immeasurably to their misery."

== Reactions ==
=== In Palestine ===
Al-Quds editor Saeb Erekat claimed that "Israel is taking advantage of the situation to do whatever they want to the Palestinians. And nobody seems to care. We are being kept under curfew until our economy is in shambles, and our moderate leadership is being meanwhile destroyed. When the war is over, there could be nothing and no one left here for any peace process." Hanna Siniora of the Israel/Palestine Center for Research and Information claimed that the Israeli government "used the gulf crisis to isolate Jerusalem from the rest of the territories." Roger Heacock of Birzeit University claimed that the curfew aimed "to snuff out the daily social manifestations of the Intifada."

The Unified National Leadership of the Uprising cancelled most planned strike actions during the curfew to allow Palestinians to be ready to shop for supplies whenever the Israeli military temporarily lifted the curfew, and largely avoided commenting on the Gulf War.

=== In Israel ===
An Israeli military official quoted by The New York Times on 31 January stated that "It is an exceptional curfew, but it is also exceptional for missiles to be falling on Tel Aviv."

Abdulwahab Darawshe MK Abdulwahab Darawshe described the curfew as a "disgusting procedure." In mid-February, human rights NGO B'Tselem spokesperson Dafna Golan stated that "After one week, after two weeks, it just doesn't make sense anymore. It can't go on like this."

=== Internationally ===
The European Economic Community provided 7,9 million in European Currency Units, to be distributed by UNRWA, to the Palestinian Territories in aid to mitigate the effects of the curfew. The government of the Netherlands also announced 2 million Dutch guilders in aid and provision of 10 000 gas masks to Palestine during the curfew.

United Nations Committee on the Exercise of the Inalienable Rights of the Palestinian People chair Absa Claude Diallo expressed "profound indignation at the stepped-up and expanded use of collective punishment by the Israeli authorities against the Palestinian people," saying that the curfew "has served only to increase the feeling of vulnerability of the Palestinians and their fear for their very existence."

In its 1992 report, Human Rights Watch stated that the curfew "appeared to be an act of collective punishment," saying that "the comprehensiveness and duration of this curfew revealed Israel's disregard of its obligations under international law to attend to the welfare of the population under occupation, and to weigh the steps it takes for its own security needs against that obligation," noting that the Israeli government "did not, for example, make adequate and timely efforts to lift the curfew to test its continuing necessity, or to allow exceptions for localities that had been relatively quiet during the intifada and presumably posed a lesser threat to security and public order." Peter Gubser of American Near East Refugee Aid stated that "conditions in the West Bank and Gaza [following the curfew] are as bad or worse than I have ever seen them, probably worse even than the aftermath of the 1967 war."

== See also ==
- Palestinian exodus from Kuwait (1990–91)
