= Dan Caspi =

Israeli media theorist

- דן כספי
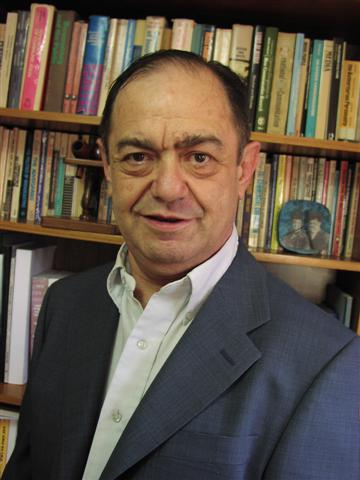
- Professor Caspi
- Born: 1 January 1945; Săveni, Romania
- Died: 22 January 2017 (aged 72); Israel
- Occupation: University lecturer

Dan Caspi (Hebrew: דן כספי; 1 December 1945 – 22 January 2017) was a lecturer at the Communication Studies Department of Ben-Gurion University of the Negev, Beersheba, Israel.

Throughout his career, Caspi has combined research with public activity and extensive, lively commentary, publishing hundreds of articles in the printed daily and online press, including regular columns in a Jerusalem local paper, in the Israel Publishers’ Association monthly Otot ("Signals")' in Haayin Hashviit ("The Seventh Eye", an online media journal)' the op-ed section of ynet (an online newspaper produced by Yedioth Ahronoth) and a blog for Ha'aretz.

== Life and work ==
Dan Caspi (originally Casapu) was born in Săveni, part of the Moldavia region of northeastern Romania. His family soon relocated to nearby Dorohoi. Although physical handicapped by cerebral palsy(CP), he attended regular local schools in Romania and then in Israel after moving there with his family in 1960, at the age of 14. The family settled in Beersheba, Israel, where Caspi completed high school.

In the mid-1960s, Caspi began undergraduate studies at the Hebrew University of Jerusalem in political science and sociology, followed by graduate studies in political science and communications. Caspi's doctoral thesis, supervised by Elihu Katz and Emanuel Gutmann, assesses Knesset Members’ perception of public opinion, as differentiated from actual public opinion. After receiving his degree in 1976, he spent a year of post-doctoral studies at MIT, under the auspices of Ithiel de Sola Pool., followed by work at other universities, including Rutgers, Manchester, Concordia, the London School of Economics and Paris VIII. During the mid-1980s, Caspi moved to the Open University of Israel and developed a communications studies program, writing and editing a series of textbooks now used at universities, colleges and professional schools in Israel. In 2000, he returned to Beersheba to help establish the Department of Communication Studies at Ben-Gurion University of the Negev, a department he headed until 2009. Caspi was married, with a daughter and four grandchildren. He died on 22 January 2017.

== Positions ==
Over the past few years, Caspi has held several academic and public positions:

- Member of the Academic Council, Hadassah College, Jerusalem
- Head of the Department of Communication Studies and the Burda Center for Innovative Communications, Ben-Gurion University of the Negev (2004–2009)
- Member of the panel of judges, Nahum Sokolov Prize (2005, 2007 and 2009)
- Member of the Israel Broadcasting Authority Executive Board (2000–2003)
- Member of the Science Council of the biannual Kesher, Tel Aviv University (since 2005)
- Founding President of the Israel Communications Association (1996–1999)
- Academic consultant to Tik Tikshoret, Israel Educational Television's weekly program devoted to media issues (1991–1993)
- Academic consultant, Koteret School of Journalism and Communications, Tel Aviv University (1992–1993)
- Consultant to the Israel Ministry of Education and Culture for the drafting of special mass media syllabi (1986–1992)
- Founder and editor, Medina, Mimshal Veyahasim Beinleumiim [State, Government and International Relations], an Israeli journal of political science (1971–1986)

== Research and publications ==
Caspi specializes in mass media, media and politics, public opinion and propaganda, media institutions, local media, minority media, media regulation and electoral campaigns. He has published over 20 books on communications and dozens of academic articles in Hebrew, English and Russian, including a children's book under the name Aba shel Inbal ("Inbal’s Father").

=== Books ===
- îòáø ìîøàä : îåñã áéàìé÷ Beyond the Mirror: The Media Map in Israel. Beer Sheva.] Ben-Gurion University Press. 2012, in Hebrew.
- Agenda: Media, Society, Politics TelAviv. Resling, 2011, in Hebrew.
- Mustafa Kabha and Dan Caspi, The Palestinian Arab In / Outsiders: Media and Conflict in Israel. London: Vallentine Mitchell, 2011.
- Hanna Adoni, Dan Caspi, Akiba A. Cohen, Media, Minorities, and Hybrid Identities: The Arab and Russian Communities in Israel. Cresskill (NJ): Hampton Press, 2006.
- Due to Technical Difficulties: The Fall of the Israeli Broadcasting Authority. Mevasereth Zion: Tzivonim, 2005, in Hebrew.
- Dan Caspi and Yehiel Limor.The In/Outsiders: The Mass Media in Israel. Cresskill (NJ): Hampton Press, 1999.
- Dan Caspi and Yehiel Limor. The Mediators: The Mass Media in Israel, 1948–1990. Tel Aviv. Am Oved, 1992, in Hebrew.
- Media Decentralization: The Case of Israel’s Local Newspapers. New Brunswick (NJ): Transaction, 1986.
- The Growth of the Local Press in Israel. Institute for Local Government, Bar-Ilan University, 1980, in Hebrew.

=== Peer-reviewed selected journal articles ===
• Dan Caspi, A Revised Look at Online Journalism in Israel: Entrenching the Old Hegemony. Israel Affairs. 17:3, 2011. 341-363.

• Dan Caspi and Nelly Elias. 'Don't patronize me: media-by and media-for minorities', Ethnic and Racial Studies, First published on: 28 April 2010 (iFirst) 34:1, 62-82.

• Dan Caspi, On Media and Politics: Between Enlightened Authority and Social Responsibility, Israel Affairs. 11:1, 2005.

• Hanna Adoni, Akiba A. Cohen and Dan Caspi, The consumer's choice: Language, media consumption and hybrid identities of minorities. Communications: European Journal of Communication Research 27:4, 2002. 411-436.

• Dan Caspi, Hanna Adoni, Akiba A. Cohen and Nelly Elias, The Red and the White and the Blue: the Russian Media in Israel. Gazette. 64:6, 2002. 551 - 570.

• Dan Caspi, When Americanization Fails? From Democracy to Demediocracy in Israel. Israel Studies Bulletin. 15. 1999. 1-5.

=== Other publications ===
- Political Polarization and Electoral Rhetoric: The Begin-Peres Televised Debates. Open University of Israel Research Report: Working Paper No. 419/88, January 1988, in Hebrew.
- Dan Caspi with Daniel Rubinstein, The Wallkeepers: Monitoring the Israel-Arab Conflict, in: Daniel Bar-Tal and Izhak Schnell, eds. The Impacts of Lasting Occupation: Lessons from Israeli Society. Oxford University Press. 299-325. 2013.
- Dan Caspi and Eleanor Lev. Just Like in America: New Media in the 18th Knesset Election Campaign, in: Asher Arian and Michal Shamir, eds. The Elections in Israel – 2009. New Brunswick, N.J.: Transaction. 251-275. 2011.
- Dan Caspi, Israel: Media System. The International Encyclopedia of Communication. Blackwell. 6: 2536-2541. 2008 (2010, revised entry).
- Dan Caspi, "Israel: From Monopoly to Open Skies," in: Anthony McNicholas and David Ward, eds. Television and Public Policy: Change and Continuity in an Era of Liberalization. Lawrence Erlbaum, New York/London. 305-321. 2008.
- Dan Caspi and Baruh Leshem, From Electoral Propaganda to Political Advertising in Israel, in: Lynda Lee Kaid and Christina Holtz-Bacha, eds. The Sage Handbook of International Political Advertising. Thousands Oaks, Ca. Sage. 109-129. 2006.
- Dan Caspi, On Media and Politics: Between Enlightened Authority and Social Responsibility, Israel Affairs. 11:1, 23-38. 2005.
- Dan Caspi, "Propaganda in Israel"& "Electoral Propaganda", in: N.J.Cull, D. Culbert & D. Welch, eds. Propaganda and Mass Persuasion: A Historical Encyclopaedia, 1500 to the Present. ABC Clio, 2003.
- Dan Caspi and Yehiel Limor, The In/outsiders – Political Control on Media in Israel: A Theoretical Framework. in: H. Herzog & E. Ben-Rafael. eds. Language and Communication in Israel. Israel Studies Series. New Brunswick, N.J. Transaction. 557-577. 2001.
- Dan Caspi, American-Style Electioneering in Israel: Americanization versus Modernization, in: David Swanson & Paolo Mancini. eds. Politics, Media and Modern Society. Westport, Connecticut. Praeger. 173-193. 1996.

=== Textbooks and textbook sections ===
- Pictures in our Heads: Public Opinion and Democracy. Tel Aviv: The Open University of Israel, 2001, in Hebrew.
- Dan Caspi and Yehiel Limor, Mass Communication: An Introduction, Units 1-4, Units 5-7, and, with Yehiel Limor. Units 8-10 (Communication Institutions). Tel Aviv: The Open University of Israel, 1993–1996, in Hebrew.
- 5. Mass Media and Politics. Government and Politics in Israel, Unit 10 .Tel Aviv: The Open University of Israel, 1990 (revised edition, 1997; Russian and revised edition, 1998), in Hebrew..

== Editing ==
1. Dan Caspi and Nelly Elias, eds. Ethnic Minorities and Media in the Holy Land. London. Vallentine Mitchell. 2014.

2. Tal Samuel-Azran and Dan Caspi, eds. New Media and Innovative Technologies. Beersheba. Ben-Gurion University Press and Tzivonim Publishing, 2008.

3. Dan Caspi, ed. Communication and Politics in Israel. Jerusalem: Van Leer/ Hakibbutz Hameuhad, 2007, in Hebrew.

4. Dan Caspi and Yehiel Limor, eds. Mass Media in Israel. Tel Aviv: The Open University of Israel, 1998, in Hebrew.

5. Dan Caspi. ed. Communications and Democracy in Israel Jerusalem: Van Leer/ Hakibbutz Hameuhad, 1997 (2nd printing – 1998; 4thprinting – 1999), in Hebrew.

6. Dan Caspi. ed. Trends and Traditions in Mass Communication: A Reader.Tel Aviv. The Open University of Israel. 1995, in Hebrew.

7. Dan Caspi, Avraham Diskin and Emanuel Gutmann, eds.The Roots of Begin’s Success: The 1981 Elections. London: Croom Helm, 1984.

== Activism ==
Caspi has long been a staunch opponent of family-owned media conglomerates in Israel and has warned repeatedly of the connection between capital, the press and government, especially regarding the rise in power of the "media barons" who head these conglomerates. In the early 1990s, Caspi published pieces critical of their cross-ownership and control of television broadcast channels. One of his newspaper articles at the time, Citizen N. M. (Hadashot, October 8, 1992), coined a lasting nickname for Yedioth Ahronoth publisher Noni Mozes. In the mid-1990s, Caspi revealed that violence against women even occurs in academic circles, breaking his colleagues’ extended silence by publishing an article entitled Don't Ask Him (People in the Forefront (Haaretz daily supplement), January 27, 1995). The two articles respectively open and close his collection of articles entitled Agenda (see list of Hebrew books, above).
