= Kuwait–Palestine relations =

- Kuwait: Palestine

Kuwait–Palestine relations refer to foreign relations between Kuwait and Palestine.

Kuwait supports the establishment of an independent Palestinian state through a two-state solution. It has stated that it will not recognize Israel until the establishment of an independent Palestine.

== History ==
After the Nakba, Palestinian Arabs moved to Kuwait for work. This movement was made easier after Kuwait removed visa requirements for Jordanians. The number of Palestinians moving to Kuwait increased after the Six-Day War when Israel occupied Gaza and the West Bank along with the Sinai and Golan Heights. From 1967 to 1969, 60 percent of teachers in Kuwait were Palestinians. Kuwait introduced the Kafala system which limited the rights of non-citizens and made a Kuwaiti responsible for any non-Kuwaiti. Kuwait limited the enrollment of non-citizens in educational institutions to 10 percent but allowed the P.L.O. to operate schools for Palestinians. The PLO tried to prevent the influence of radical organizations, such as the P.F.L.P., from increasing their influence in the Palestinian community in Kuwait. The PLO took five percent of the salary of Palestinians as tax for the Fatah-controlled Palestinian National Fund.

In 1976, Kuwait closed schools operated by the Palestinian Liberation Organization which increased overcrowding in public schools. It made laws requiring expatriates to send their children to private schools. In 1986, 200 out of 276 seats reserved for foreigners at Kuwait University went to Palestinians. The Kuwaiti Government started a process of increasing the number of Kuwaitis in education and bureaucracy and reducing the number of Palestinians.

=== Expulsion of Palestinians after Gulf War ===
During the Gulf War, the Palestinian Liberation Organization (PLO) supported Iraq's Saddam Hussein which harmed relations with Kuwait. The Palestinian Arabs believed supporting Iraq would be the best way to establish a Palestine State after Saddam promised to confront Israel before the invasion. The Palestinian Liberation Organization's office in Kuwait opposed the invasion but its office in Bagdad and Jordan supported the invasion. Rafiq Shafiq Qiblawi, PLO official in Kuwait, was assassinated by the Iraqis for opposing the invasion. Nonetheless, the image of Palestinians in Kuwait was irrevocably damaged after Saddam Hussein used the Arab Liberation Front and Palestinian Liberation Front (Abu Abbas Faction) in the occupation of Kuwait. 70 percent of Palestinians in Kuwait boycotted work but 30 percent continued. Although Palestinians helped Kuwaitis during the war including tending to the injured and helping to distribute aid, a large number of Kuwaitis continued to blame Palestinians over the PLO siding with Iraq.

Palestinians who lived in Kuwait during the war suffered collective punishment over Arafat's deal with Saddam Hussein, even though many disagreed with the PLO’s stance. After the United States removed Iraqi forces from Kuwait, hundreds of Palestinian youth were killed and/or tortured by Kuwaiti resistance. Palestinians were victims of arbitrary detentions as part of discrimination upon the Palestinian community. Palestinians were fired from government jobs and expelled from educational institutions. Overall, Kuwait expelled Palestinians living in the country in what is known as the Palestinian exodus from Kuwait (1990–91). The Palestinian population shrunk from 400 thousand to 20 thousand. Kuwait also closed the Embassy of Palestine.

=== Apology and restoration of ties ===
In 2004, Mahmoud Abbas made formal apology to Kuwait for siding with Iraq in the Gulf War. Previously, Al Tayeb Abdul Rahim, had refused to apologize and stated Kuwait made the Palestinians suffer.

In 2013, the Embassy of Palestine in Kuwait was reopened.

Salem Abdullah Al-Jaber Al-Sabah, Minister of Foreign Affairs of Kuwait, called for an end to the Gaza war, aid to be provided to the Palestinians, and establishment of an independent Palestinian state on 30 October 2023. Kuwaiti National Assembly discussed the war in Gaza criticizing Israel and the UN Security Council. Kuwait accused Israel of violating International law. Hamas praised Kuwait for their stance. Kuwait donated US$2 million to United Nations Relief and Works Agency for Palestine Refugees in the Near East. Crown prince Nawaf Al-Ahmad Al-Jaber Al-Sabah condemned Israel. Protests were held in Kuwait in solidarity with the Palestinians.

== See also ==
- Foreign relations of Kuwait
- Foreign relations of Palestine
- International recognition of Palestine
