= Hayel Abdul Hamid =

Fatah member (1937–1991)

- Born: 1937; Safed, Mandatory Palestine
- Died: 14 January 1991 (aged 54–55); Carthage, Tunisia
- Cause of death: Assassination
- Burial place: Amman, Jordan

Hayel Abdul Hamid, known as Abu al Hol, (Arabic: هايل عبد الحميد; 1937–1991) was a Palestinian who was a member of the Fatah. He served in its different agencies and was its security head. He was assassinated at his home in Carthage, Tunisia, on 14 January 1991 along with other Fatah members, Salah Khalaf and Fakhri Al Omari.

== Early life and education ==
Abdul Hamid was born in Safed, Mandatory Palestine, in 1937. The family had to leave their hometown in 1948 when Israel was established. They settled in the Yarmouk refuge camp in Damascus, Syria.

Abdul Hamid completed his secondary education in Damascus. He went to Frankfurt, Germany, for his undergraduate study where he became acquainted with the Fatah leadership.

== Career and activities ==
Abdul Hamid established an organization, the Arabs of Palestine, in Damascus which became part of the Fatah in 1960. Therefore, he was one of the second-wave members of the group. He established the Fatah cells in West Germany during his university studies. He collaborated with another Fatah member, Hani Al Hassan, in these activities. He joined the General Union of Palestinian Students in Cairo and was elected its president on the Fatah list in 1966.

Abdul Hamid was the head of the Fatah forces in Egypt and Syria. He was sent to China for leadership and military training in 1967. He became the Fatah's secretary in Cairo in 1969 and later joined the Fatah's Lebanon branch in 1972. He was appointed head of the Fatah's security agency in April 1973.

Abdul Hamid settled in Tripoli in June 1983 after the Palestinian leaders left Beirut. He and others had to leave Tripoli in December 1983 and went to Tunisia. Following the assassination of Khalil Al Wazir in April 1988 Abdul Hamed became the commissioner of the Occupied Territory Agency and continued to lead the Fatah's security branch. Abdul Hamid was elected to the Central Committee of Fatah in August 1989.

== Assassination ==
Abdul Hamid was assassinated at his home in Carthage, Tunisia, on 14 January 1991 along with Salah Khalaf and Fakhri Al Omari. Both Khalaf and Al Omari died instantly, and Abdul Hamid died at Tawfik Hospital. A funeral service was held for them in Amman where they were buried at the martyr's cemetery.

The perpetrator was Hamza Abu Said, a Palestinian bodyguard, who had been born in Wahdat refuge camp, Jordan, in 1963. He is thought to be recruited by the Abu Nidal Organization for this attack. He held Abdul Hamid's wife and daughter hostage for five hours. Then he escaped from the site, but he was captured by the Tunisian security forces.

Abu Said was interrogated and imprisoned by the Tunisian authorities. He declared during the interrogation that he was an agent of the Abu Nidal Organization. Later the PLO leader Yasser Arafat managed to take him from the Tunisians through his meeting with the Tunisian President Zine El Abidine Ben Ali. Abu Said was transferred to Sanaa, Yemen, where he was questioned and tried by the PLO military tribunal and was given a death sentence. He was found dead in his cell in June 1991.

== Legacy ==
The Hayel Abdel Hamid School in Beit Hanoun was established in memory of him.

== See also ==
- List of Fatah members
