= Fakhri Al Omari =

Fatah member (1936–1991)

- Born: 1936; Jaffa, Mandatory Palestine
- Died: 14 January 1991 (aged 54–55); Carthage, Tunisia
- Cause of death: Assassination
- Burial place: Amman, Jordan

Fakhri Al Omari (Note: Arabic: فخري العمري) (1936 – 14 January 1991), known as Abu Muhammad, (Note: Arabic: أبو محمد, romanized: ʾAbū Muḥammad) was a Palestinian who was a member of the Fatah movement. He was an aide of Salah Khalaf. They were assassinated by the Abu Nidal Organization in Tunisia on 14 January 1991.

== Biography ==
Fakhri Al Omari was born in Jaffa in 1936. He was one of the participants in the first meeting of the Fatah movement in Cairo in 1955. He was trained in specialist intelligence in Cairo in 1969. He served as an aide to the Fatah founder Salah Khalaf and was an operations officer in the group.

Al Omari was a member of the Black September Organization which attacked and killed the Israeli athletes during the 1972 Summer Olympics in Munich in September 1972. He was one of the planners of the attack. The decision to organize the Munich attack was taken by Salah Khalaf, Abu Daoud and Al Omari in a meeting at a Roman coffee shop in early July 1972. Al Omari took the weapons from the lockers in the Munich central railway station. These weapons which would be used in the attack were put there by two Palestinians on 23 August 1972.

Al Omari was allegedly among those who planned the assassination of the Jordanian Prime Minister Wasfi Tal in Cairo in November 1971.

Due to his direct involvement in the Munich attack, Al Omari was on the assassination list of the Mossad's Committee X.

== Assassination ==
Al Omari was assassinated in Carthage, Tunisia, on 14 January 1991, along with Salah Khalaf at the home of Hayel Abdul Hamid, chief security officer of the Palestine Liberation Organization (PLO). Both Khalaf and Al Omari died instantly, and Abdul Hamid died in a hospital. A funeral service was held for them in Amman where they were buried at the martyr's cemetery.

The perpetrator was Hamza Abu Said, a Palestinian bodyguard born in Wahdat refuge camp, Jordan, in 1963. He is thought to be recruited by the Abu Nidal Organization for this attack. He held Abdul Hamid's wife and daughter hostage for five hours. Then he escaped from the site, but he was captured by the Tunisian security forces.

Abu Said was interrogated and imprisoned by the Tunisian authorities. He declared during the interrogation that he was an agent of the Abu Nidal Organization. Later the PLO leader Yasser Arafat managed to take him from the Tunisians through his meeting with the Tunisian President Zine El Abidine Ben Ali. Abu Said was transferred to Sanaa, Yemen, where he was questioned and tried by the PLO and was given a death sentence. He was found dead in his cell in June 1991.

== See also ==
- List of Fatah members
