= Abu Nidal Organization =

1974–1997 Palestinian nationalist militant group

- منظمة أبو نضال
- Other name: Fatah – Revolutionary Council
- Founding leader: Abu Nidal
- Dates active: 1974–2002
- Split from: Fatah
- Ideology: Palestinian nationalism Anti-Zionism; Pan-Arabism; Secularism
- Political position: Left-wing
- Status: Defunct

The Abu Nidal Organization (ANO; Arabic: منظمة أبو نضال Munaẓẓamat Abu Nidal), officially Fatah – Revolutionary Council (فتح – المجلس الثوري Fatah al-Majles al-Thawry), was a Palestinian militant group founded by Abu Nidal in 1974. It broke away from Fatah, a faction within the Palestine Liberation Organization, following the emergence of a rift between Abu Nidal and Yasser Arafat. The ANO was designated as a terrorist organization by Israel, the United States, the United Kingdom, Canada, the European Union and Japan. However, a number of Arab countries supported the group's activities; it was backed by Iraq from 1974 to 1983, by Syria from 1983 to 1987, and by Libya from 1987 to 1997. It briefly cooperated with Egypt from 1997 to 1998, but ultimately returned to Iraq in December 1998, where it continued to have the state's backing until Abu Nidal's death in August 2002.

In practice, the ANO was leftist and secularist, as well as anti-Zionist and anti-Western. In theory, it was not particularly associated with any specific ideology—or at least no such foundation was declared. It was mostly linked with the pursuit of Abu Nidal's personal agendas. The ANO was established to carry on an armed struggle in pursuit of pan-Arabism and the destruction of Israel. Like other Palestinian militant groups, the ANO carried out worldwide hijackings, assassinations, kidnappings of diplomats, and attacks on synagogues. It was responsible for 90 terrorist attacks between 1974 and 1992. In 2002, Abu Nidal died under disputed circumstances in Baghdad, with Palestinian sources claiming that he was assassinated on the orders of Iraqi president Saddam Hussein.

== Formation and background ==
The Abu Nidal Organization was established by Sabri Khalil al-Bannah (Abu Nidal), known by his nom de guerre Abu Nidal, a Palestinian Arab nationalist and a former Ba'ath party member. Abu Nidal long argued that PLO membership should be open to all Arabs, not just Palestinians. He also argued that Palestine must be established as an Arab state, stretching from the Jordan River in the east to the Mediterranean in the west. Abu Nidal established his faction within the PLO, just prior to Black September in Jordan, and following internal disagreements within the PLO. During Fatah's Third Congress in Damascus in 1971, he emerged as the leader of a leftist alliance against Yasser Arafat. After the 1973 Yom Kippur War, many members of the mainstream Fatah movement argued that a political solution with Israel should be an option. Consequently, Abu Nidal split from Fatah in 1974 and formed his "rejectionist" front to carry on a Pan-Arabist armed struggle.

Abu Nidal's first independent operation took place on September 5, 1973, when five gunmen using the name Al-Iqab ("The Punishment") seized the Saudi embassy in Paris, taking 11 hostages and threatening to blow up the building if Abu Dawud was not released from jail in Jordan, where he had been arrested in February 1973 for an attempt on King Hussein's life. Following the incident, Mahmoud Abbas of the PLO took flight to Iraq to meet Abu Nidal. In the meeting Abbas became so angry, that he stormed out of the meeting, followed by the other PLO delegates, and from that point on, the PLO regarded Abu Nidal as a mercenary.

Two months later, just after the October 1973 Yom Kippur War, during discussions about convening a peace conference in Geneva, the Abu Nidal Organization (ANO) hijacked a KLM airliner, using the name of the Arab Nationalist Youth Organization. The operation was intended to send a signal to Fatah not to send representatives to any peace conference. In response, Arafat officially expelled Abu Nidal from Fatah in March 1974, and the rift between the two groups, and the two men, was complete. In June the same year, ANO formed the Rejectionist Front, a political coalition that opposed the Ten Point Program adopted by the Palestine Liberation Organization in its 12th Palestinian National Congress session.

Abu Nidal then moved to Ba'athist Iraq where he set up the ANO, which soon began a string of terrorist attacks aimed at Israel and Western countries. Setting himself up as a freelance contractor, Abu Nidal is believed by the United States Department of State to have ordered attacks in 20 countries, killing or injuring over 900 people. The ANO group's most notorious attacks were on the El Al ticket counters at Rome and Vienna airports in December 1985, when Arab gunmen high on amphetamines opened fire on passengers in simultaneous shootings, killing 18 and wounding 120. Patrick Seale, Abu Nidal's biographer, wrote of the attacks that their "random cruelty marked them as typical Abu Nidal operations."

== Attacks ==
The ANO carried out attacks in 20 countries worldwide, killing or injuring about 1,650 people. Targets include the United States, the United Kingdom, France, Israel, moderate Palestinians, the PLO, and various Arab and European countries. The group has not attacked Western targets since the late 1980s.

Major attacks included the Rome and Vienna Airport Attacks in December 1985, the Neve Shalom synagogue in Istanbul and the Pan Am Flight 73 hijacking in Karachi in September 1986, and the City of Poros day-excursion ship attack in Greece in July 1988.

The ANO has been especially noted for its uncompromising stance on negotiation with Israel, treating anything less than all-out military struggle against Israel as treachery. This led the group to perform numerous attacks against the PLO, which had made clear it accepted a negotiated solution to the conflict. Fatah-RC is believed to have assassinated PLO deputy chief Abu Iyad and PLO security chief Abul Hul in Tunis in January 1991. It assassinated a Jordanian diplomat in Lebanon in January 1994 and has been linked to the killing of the PLO representative there. Noted PLO moderate Issam Sartawi was killed by the Fatah-RC in 1983. In October 1974, the group also made a failed assassination attempt on the present Palestinian president and PLO chairman, Mahmoud Abbas. These attacks, and numerous others, led to the PLO issuing a death sentence in absentia against Abu Nidal. In the early 1990s, it made an attempt to gain control of a refugee camp in Lebanon, but this was thwarted by PLO organizations.

== Internal executions and torture ==
The ANO's official newspaper Filastin al-Thawra regularly carried stories announcing the execution of traitors within the movement. Each new recruit of the ANO was given several days to write down his life story and sign a paper agreeing to his execution if anything was found to be untrue. Every so often, the recruit would be asked to rewrite the whole story. Any discrepancies were taken as evidence that he was a spy and he would be made to write it out again, often after days of being beaten and nights spent forced to sleep standing up.

British journalist Alec Collett was killed by the ANO in Aita al-Foukhar (village in Lebanon) in 1986. He was hanged on a rope and was shot in retaliation to US air raids on Libya.

By 1987, Abu Nidal used extreme torture tactics on members of the ANO who were suspected of betrayal and disloyalty. The tactics included hanging prisoners naked, whipping them until unconsciousness, using salt or chili powder to revive them, forcing them into a car tire for whipping and salt application, melting plastic on their skin, frying their genitals, and confining them in tiny cells bound hand and foot. If cells were full, prisoners could be buried alive with a steel pipe for breathing. Execution was carried out by firing a bullet down the pipe.

From 1987 to 1988, hundreds of members of Abu Nidal's organization were killed due to internal paranoia and terror tactics. The elderly wife of a veteran member was also killed on false charges. The killings were mostly carried out by four individuals: Mustafa Ibrahim Sanduqa, Isam Maraqa, Sulaiman Samrin, and Mustafa Awad. Decisions to kill were mostly made by Abu Nidal after he had consumed a whole bottle of whiskey at night. According to ANO dissidents, the attacks made by the group were unconnected to the Palestinian cause and led to their defection. In addition, they said that Abu Nidal was the "living example of paranoia".

== See also ==
- Abu Nidal
- Arab People's Movement
- Popular Front for the Liberation of Palestine
- Olivia Frank
- List of military units named after people
- 15 May Organization
- Black September Organization
