= Mustafa Kabha =

Palestinian historian

- مصطفى داود كبها
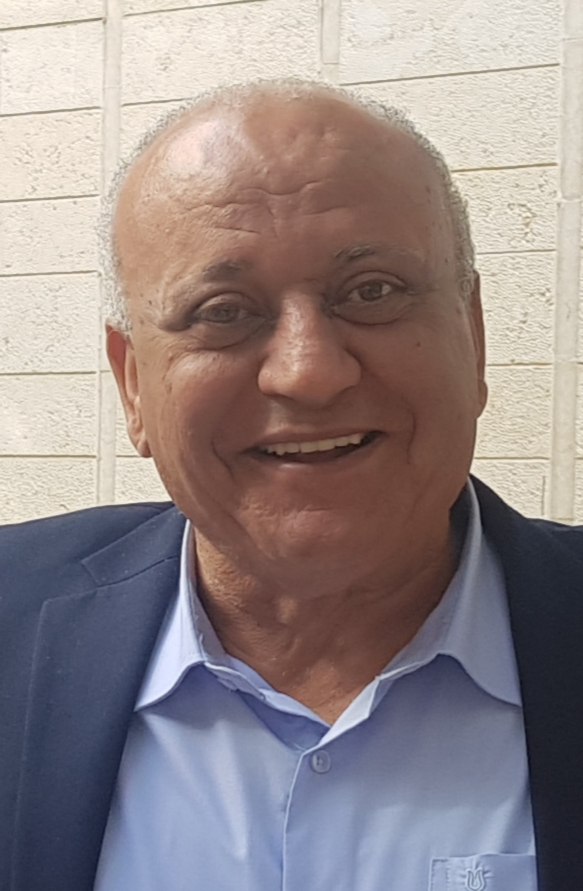
- Kabha in 2022
- Born: 1962 (age 63–64); Umm al-Qutuf, Israel

Academic background
- Education: Tel Aviv University
- Doctoral advisor: Israel Gershoni

Academic work
- Discipline: History
- Sub-discipline: Palestinian history, Middle Eastern history, history of the press, oral history, toponymy
- Institutions: Open University of Israel
- Notable works: The Palestinian Press as Shaper of Public Opinion, 1929–39: Writing up a Storm; The Palestinian Arab In/Outsiders; The Palestinian People: Seeking Sovereignty and State; The Lost Orchard

Mustafa Daoud Kabha (Arabic: مصطفى داود كبها; Hebrew: מוסטפא כבהא) is a Palestinian historian and professor of modern Middle Eastern history at the Open University of Israel. His scholarship encompasses the history of the Palestinians, with particular emphasis on the Palestinian national movement, oral history, and Palestinian toponymy. He is recognized for his work on Palestinian historiography, journalism and memory studies, and has been described as one of the leading Palestinian scholars in these fields.

Kabha has served as president of the Academy of the Arabic Language in Israel since 2021. In 2025, the Arabic service of the Israeli Public Broadcasting Corporation identified him as both president of the Academy and head of Middle Eastern history at the Open University.

== Education and academic career ==
Kabha studied at Tel Aviv University, receiving a BA in Middle Eastern history and Arabic literature in 1984 and an MA in history in 1987. His master's thesis examined the War of Attrition through Egyptian sources. He completed his PhD in history at Tel Aviv University in 1996 under the supervision of Israel Gershoni. His dissertation examined the role of the press and journalistic discourse in the Palestinian Arab national struggle between 1929 and 1939.

He worked as a researcher, tutor and course-development consultant in Islam and Middle Eastern history at the Open University from 1992. During the late 1990s and early 2000s he also taught at Tel Aviv University, the University of Haifa, Yezreel Valley College and the Arab Academic Institute at Beit Berl College. He joined the Open University as a lecturer in 2004, became a senior lecturer in 2007 and an associate professor in 2010. From 2012 to 2015 he chaired its Department of History, Philosophy and Judaic Studies, and in 2019 was promoted to full professor.

His teaching and research at the Open University have centered on modern Middle Eastern history, Palestinian history and Arab mass communications.

== Academy of the Arabic Language ==
Kabha has been a member of the Academy of the Arabic Language in Israel since its establishment and served as head of its place-names committee before being elected president in 2021, following the death of its founding president, Mahmoud Ghanayim.

The Academy is one of the principal Arabic-language scholarly institutions operating among Palestinian citizens of Israel. Linguist Muhammad Amara has described the Arabic language academies in Israel as institutions concerned with linguistic research, the modernization and development of Arabic and wider questions of language and national identity.

Kabha's work associated with the Academy has included research on Palestinian place names and their linguistic, historical, geographic and social contexts.

== Scholarship ==
=== Palestinian press and mass communications ===
Kabha's research concerns the development of the Palestinian Arabic press and its relationship to political mobilization, national identity and the formation of public opinion. His doctoral research formed the basis for the Hebrew-language study The Press in the Eye of the Storm and the English monograph The Palestinian Press as Shaper of Public Opinion, 1929–39: Writing up a Storm, published by Vallentine Mitchell in 2007.

The book examines the Palestinian press during the decade preceding the 1936–1939 Arab revolt in Palestine, including the political affiliations of newspapers, their readership, their role in political mobilization and their engagement with questions of land, agriculture and social organization. It was reviewed in the Journal of Palestine Studies and the Middle East Studies Association Bulletin.

With the late media scholar Dan Caspi, Kabha co-authored The Palestinian Arab In/Outsiders: Media and Conflict in Israel (2011), a study of the development of Arabic-language media among Palestinian citizens of Israel and its relationship to state policy, political conflict and Palestinian identity.

His research has also addressed the representation of Palestinian citizens in Hebrew-language media. In a 2019 interview with The Seventh Eye, Kabha argued that Israeli media coverage of Arab citizens continued to reproduce patterns established during the early decades of the state, frequently treating Arab society as external to the political majority and approaching Arab public figures primarily through ethnic and national categories.

=== Palestinian history and historiography ===
Kabha's work extends beyond media history to the political and social history of the Palestinians in the twentieth and twenty-first centuries. His 2013 monograph The Palestinian People: Seeking Sovereignty and State traces Palestinian political history from the 1936–1939 revolt through the dispersion caused by the 1948 Palestine war, the development of the Palestine Liberation Organization, the First Intifada, the Oslo Accords and the subsequent political division between Fatah and Hamas. The book also considers Palestinian communities in Israel, the occupied Palestinian territories and the wider diaspora. It was reviewed in Arab Studies Quarterly.

Kabha has also written on Palestinian historiography of the Nakba, the relationship between written documentation and oral testimony, Palestinian responses to fascism and Nazism, the history of Palestinian prisoners, internal refugees and representations of the 1948 war. His contribution to The Holocaust and the Nakba examined the Palestinian communist intellectual Najati Sidqi in opposition to Nazi ideology during the Second World War.

=== Economic and social history ===
With historian Nahum Karlinsky, Kabha published The Lost Orchard: The Palestinian-Arab Citrus Industry, 1850–1950 with Syracuse University Press in 2021. The book reconstructs the development of the Palestinian Arab citrus industry and its relationship with the Jewish citrus sector, treating citrus production as a field of modernization, social mobility, economic competition and Arab–Jewish cooperation before 1948.

In a 2023 review essay in the International Journal of Middle East Studies, historian Mark LeVine noted that citrus became Palestine's most profitable export industry during the Mandate period; that the Palestinian Arab citrus sector underwent substantial modernization; and that cooperation between Arab and Jewish producers increased in important areas despite intensifying national conflict. LeVine recognized the authors' discussion of the binational Citrus Control Board and their interpretation of Jaffa and citrus production as mechanisms of Palestinian social mobility and modernization.

=== Toponymy and local history ===
Another strand of Kabha's scholarship concerns Palestinian place names and their relationship to landscape, language, settlement history and collective memory. His Arabic-language works include التسميات الفلسطينية وعلاقتها بالحيّز المكاني: منطقة اللجون مثالًا (2013), a study of Palestinian place names in the Lajjun region, and the series لكل عين مشهد (For Every Eye a Landscape).

The first volume of لكل عين مشهد, published in 2017, examines the place names of the western part of the former Tulkarm subdistrict in their linguistic, geographic, historical and social contexts. A second volume, published in 2024, applied the approach to the former Haifa subdistrict. In 2026, the third volume concerning Jenin subdistrict was published. His work on toponymy has been closely associated with his activities in the Academy of the Arabic Language and its place-names committee.

Kabha has also produced local histories and oral-history collections concerning Palestinian communities, including studies of Kafr Qara, Kafr Qasim, and other localities.

== Selected publications ==
=== Books in English ===
- Kabha, Mustafa (2007). The Palestinian Press as Shaper of Public Opinion, 1929–39: Writing up a Storm. London: Vallentine Mitchell. ISBN 9780853036722.
- Kabha, Mustafa; Caspi, Dan (2011). The Palestinian Arab In/Outsiders: Media and Conflict in Israel. London: Vallentine Mitchell. ISBN 9780853039112.
- Kabha, Mustafa (2013). The Palestinian People: Seeking Sovereignty and State. Boulder, Colorado: Lynne Rienner Publishers. ISBN 9781588268822.
- Kabha, Mustafa; Karlinsky, Nahum (2021). The Lost Orchard: The Palestinian-Arab Citrus Industry, 1850–1950. Syracuse, New York: Syracuse University Press. ISBN 9780815636700.

=== Books in Arabic ===
- Kabha, Mustafa (2004). تحت عين الرقيب: الصحافة الفلسطينية ودورها في الكفاح الوطني بين الحربين العالميتين [Under the Eye of the Censor: The Palestinian Press and Its Role in the National Struggle between the Two World Wars] (in Arabic). Beit Berl: Center for Arabic Literature Studies, Beit Berl College.
- Kabha, Mustafa; Awawidah, Wadie (2013). أسرى بلا حراب: المعتقلون الفلسطينيون والمعتقلات الإسرائيلية الأولى، 1948–1949 [Prisoners without Bayonets: Palestinian Prisoners and the First Israeli Detention Centers, 1948–1949] (in Arabic). Beirut: Institute for Palestine Studies.
- Kabha, Mustafa (2013). التسميات الفلسطينية وعلاقتها بالحيّز المكاني: منطقة اللجون مثالًا [Palestinian Place Names and Their Relationship to Spatial Landscape: The Lajjun Region as a Case Study] (in Arabic). Haifa: Academy of the Arabic Language.
- Kabha, Mustafa (2017). لكل عين مشهد: تسميات الأماكن في القطاع الغربي لقضاء طولكرم الانتدابي: أبعاد وسياقات لغوية وجغرافية وتاريخية واجتماعية [For Every Eye a Landscape: Place Names in the Western Part of the Mandatory Tulkarm Subdistrict in their Linguistic, Geographical, Historical and Social Contexts] (in Arabic). Nazareth: Academy of the Arabic Language. ISBN 9659251866.
- Kabha, Mustafa (2023). كفر قرع: تاريخ، تراث ومعالم [Kafr Qara: History, Heritage and Landmarks] (in Arabic). Kafr Qara.
- Kabha, Mustafa (2024). لكل عين مشهد 2: تسميات الأماكن في قضاء حيفا الانتدابي: أبعاد لغوية وتاريخية وجغرافية واجتماعية [For Every Eye a Landscape 2: Place Names in the Mandatory Haifa Subdistrict: Linguistic, Historical, Geographical and Social Dimensions] (in Arabic). Haifa: Academy of the Arabic Language.
- Kabha, Mustafa (2026). لكل عين مشهد 3: تسميات الأماكن في قضاء جنين الانتدابي: أبعاد لغوية وتاريخية وجغرافية واجتماعية [For Every Eye a Landscape 3: Place Names in the Mandatory Jenin Subdistrict: Linguistic, Historical, Geographical and Social Dimensions] (in Arabic). Haifa: Bayt al-Dhakira wal-Turath.

=== Selected articles and chapters ===
- Kabha, Mustafa (2003). "The Palestinian Press and the General Strike, April–October 1936: Filastin as a Case Study". Middle Eastern Studies. 39 (3): 169–190.
- Kabha, Mustafa; Erlich, Haggai (2006). "Al-Ahbash and the Wahhabiyya: Interpretations of Islam". International Journal of Middle East Studies. 38 (4): 519–538.
- Kabha, Mustafa (2011). "The Palestinian National Movement and Its Attitude toward the Fascist and Nazi Movements, 1925–1945". Geschichte und Gesellschaft. 37: 437–450.
- Gribiea, Adnan; Kabha, Mustafa; Abu Saad, Ismael (2017). "New Mass Communication Media and the Identity of Negev Bedouin Arab Youth in Israel: In Conversation with Edward Said". Journal of Holy Land and Palestine Studies. 16 (1): 99–123.
- Kabha, Mustafa (2018). "The Arabic Palestinian Press between the Two World Wars". In Gorman, Anthony; Monciaud, Didier (eds.). The Press in the Middle East and North Africa, 1850–1950: Politics, Social History and Culture. Edinburgh University Press. pp. 99–126. doi:10.3366/edinburgh/9781474430616.003.0004.
- Kabha, Mustafa (2018). "A Bold Voice Raised Above the Raging Waves: Palestinian Intellectual Najati Sidqi and His Battle with Nazi Doctrine at the Time of World War II". In Bashir, Bashir; Goldberg, Amos (eds.). The Holocaust and the Nakba: A New Grammar of Trauma and History. Columbia University Press. pp. 154–173.
- Kabha, Mustafa (2018). "The Life of Jewish Immigrants from Muslim Countries in the Transit Camps as Reflected in the Arabic Journalistic Discourse in Israel, 1950–1967". Israel Studies. 23 (3): 123–131.
- Kabha, Mustafa (2022). "Between Local Palestinian Nationalism and Pan-Arab Nationalism among Palestinians during the British Mandate: Akram Zu'Ayter as an Example". In Cohen, Michael J. (ed.). The British Mandate in Palestine, 1920–2020. Routledge.
