= Arab People's Movement =

Political faction

The Arab People's Movement (Arabic: الحركة الشعبية العربية) was a small Palestinian political faction, led by Naji Alush (Arab nationalist intellectual in the Fatah movement, general secretary of the Union of Palestinian Writers and Journalists). The group was founded as Alush left the Fatah Revolutionary Council in 1977.
