= Aita al-Foukhar =

Aayta El Foukhar عيتا الفخار Aita al-Foukhar
- Village
- Location in Lebanon
- Coordinates: 33°38′23″N 35°54′23″E
- Country: Lebanon
- Governorate: Beqaa Governorate
- District: Rashaya District
- Elevation: 3,900 ft (1,200 m)

Aita el-Foukhar (Arabic: عيتا الفخار) is a village in Lebanon, located in the Bekaa Valley in the Rashaya District of Lebanon A small village of narrow streets and humble houses, Aita is surrounded by high mountains on three sides, reaching 1,400 metres (4,600 ft) above sea level at some points. The village itself is almost 1,250 metres (4,100 ft) above sea level. Aita is exemplary for toleration and acceptance as lived day to day through the mixed religious background (Antiochan Orthodox and Muslim) of its inhabitants. Throughout the whole civil war, no single accident was recorded and this is all due to the mutual love and affection of its residents. As it is with many Lebanese towns, its mosques embrace the churches and similarly its residents where they stand by each other at every occasion.

The village name combines the Syriac words aitha, meaning temple, and foukhar, meaning pottery. Together they refer to a pottery production center.

The mountain to the north of the village is steep and not useful for agriculture. To the east and south, the mountains have gentle slopes, and terraces are formed to use the land for agriculture. People cultivate several products including wheat, mulberries, cherries, figs, apples, grapes and olives.

Water sources are available mainly from springs such as Ain el-Arish. Until the present, the inhabitants of the village partially depended on this spring as a source of water. Water and a pleasant climate would have been attractive reasons for the settlement of the village in the early A.C. periods.

Many of Aita el-Foukhar's residents have left for bigger cities in Lebanon while some still live in Aita. Others have emigrated to North and South America, Australia, Africa, Middle East, Europe, and many other places in the world. Between 1975 and 1990, only minor developments were recorded due to the unstableness of the circumstances. In 1998 the first municipality council was elected and a major development on the infrastructure was started. A new sewage system was installed as a part of regional West Bekaa and Rachaya districts Network. As for the drinking water system, a new well was dug with a capacity of 3 inches per minute, and a public water tank was built on a higher location to feed the 200 houses of the village with drinking water. A huge water filter was installed as well after the tank to ensure a clean water to the inhabitants of Aita. A new network of 6 miles of water tubes was installed to deliver the drinking water to houses.
