= General Union of Palestinian Teachers =

Trade union

The General Union of Palestinian Teachers (GUPT) is the main teacher association in Palestine.

== History ==
The General Union of Teachers in Palestine was founded in 1969 with support from the Palestine Liberation Organization.

In the 1970s, 48,000 teachers were affiliated with the General Union of Palestinian Teachers, more than half of whom were originally from refugee camps.

In 1980, seven members of the General Union of Palestinian Teachers were representatives of the 1980 National Council of the Palestine Liberation Organization as part of the Department of Mass Organizations.

In 1994, after the establishment of the Palestinian National Authority, the name of the union was changed to "The General Union of Palestinian Teachers - GUPT". Elections were held for GUPT branches in 1995 and for union leadership in 1997.

In August 2008, the GUPT called on teachers to protest decisions made by the Ministry of Education in Gaza, such as "transferring school directors and teachers to other schools, arresting a number of directors and teachers, attacking janitors, and confiscating keys to schools." By September 2, 2008, about 50% of Palestinian Authority school teachers in Gaza were on strike. By November 2008, the strike disrupted 381 government schools and impacted 250,000 students.

During the Gaza war, several international educational unions supported GUPT. In 2025, the Irish National Teachers’ Organisation (INTO) adopted a resolution declaring solidarity with GUPT by endorsing the BDS movement. Education International and its member organizations contributed "targeted financial assistance" to support Palestinian educators who had been displaced to Egypt in their work despite the humanitarian crisis.

== Mission ==
GUPT supports Palestinian teachers and aims to build good relations with the teacher unions around the world.
