= Salah Khalaf =

Palestinian Fatah senior official (1933–1991)

- صلاح خلف

Personal details
- Born: 31 August 1933 Jaffa, Mandatory Palestine
- Died: 14 January 1991 (aged 57) Carthage, Tunisia
- Cause of death: Assassination
- Resting place: Amman, Jordan
- Citizenship: Palestine
- Party: Fatah
- Children: 6
- Education: Al Azhar University; Ain Shams University
- Occupation: Politician

Salah Mesbah Khalaf (Arabic: صلاح مصباح خلف, romanized: Ṣalāḥ Maṣbāḥ Ḵalaf; IPA: [sˤa.laːħ misˤ.baːħ xa.laf]), also known as Abu Iyad (Arabic: أبو إياد, romanized: ʾAbū ʾIyād; IPA: [ʔa.buː ʔi.jaːd]) (31 August 1933 – 14 January 1991), was a Palestinian militant and the deputy chief and head of intelligence for the Palestine Liberation Organization. He was the second most senior official of Fatah after Yasser Arafat.

The United States and Israel believed him to have been a founder of the Black September Organization.

Suspected of having helped the CIA to break up Abu Nidal's so-called "Abu Nidal Organization", Khalaf was assassinated by a member of that organization in 1991. Palestinians, and many onlookers, generally believe Abu Nidal was responsible for his death. Some believe the order came from Iraqi President Saddam Hussein.

== Early life and education ==
Khalaf was born in northern Jaffa in 1933, close to Tel Aviv. His father, who came from Gaza, ran a grocery in Carmel Market, where half of his clients were Jewish and he spoke Hebrew, which his son also picked up from companions among Sephardic Jews. Salah had four siblings. One of his uncles was married to a Jew.

He dates his first feelings of animosity towards Jews to an incident in 1945, when he was taunted by Jewish youths for being an Arab while riding over to visit relatives. They smashed his bicycle, and, on returning home, he learnt that Jewish friends had falsely reported that he had knifed Jews in Jaffa, at a time corresponding to the bicycle incident. He was arrested, aged 11, by British police, beaten up and sentenced to a year of house arrest.

On expiry of the sentence, he joined the 'lion cubs' of the Al-Najjada militia founded by his school principal Muhammad Nimr al-Hawari, which inculcated a rejection of racism, bigotry, and parochial loyalism, and taught him how to retaliate to violence with violence.

His family abandoned Jaffa by boat for Gaza on 13 May 1948, as part of a general flight inspired by news of the Deir Yassin massacre and a sense of Jewish military superiority. They fully expected to return as an expected tide in the fortunes of war changed, enabling the Arab armies to drive back to Zionists. He moved to Cairo in the early 1950s, enrolling in the Dar al-Ulum teacher's college. There, in 1951, he became a member of the Muslim Brotherhood.

== Collaboration with Arafat, role in the PLO ==
In 1951, Khalaf met Yasser Arafat at the al-Azhar University—where he studied literature—during a meeting of the General Union of Palestinian Students. He returned to Gaza in 1957 with a combined degree in philosophy and psychology, and a teacher's certificate from Ain Shams University, where he was assigned to teach at Al Zahra, a girls' school, a position that was, in his memoirs, allocated in order to make him a pariah in the city. The posting lasted six months, after which he was transferred to teach in a makeshift school for poor refugee boys in the Gaza desert. Responding to a call from Arafat, he left for Kuwait and, together with Arafat, Farouk al-Qaddum, Khaled al-Hassan, Abd al-Muhsin al-Qatan and Khalil Ibrahim al-Wazir, founded Fatah - a name meaning "Conquest" composed from the reversed initials of Harakat al-Tahrir al-Watani al-Filastini (Movement for the National Liberation of Palestine).

He was accused by Israel and the United States of having founded the Black September Organization. As a result, Khalaf was arrested by the Jordanians and then released after he appealed to his comrades to stop fighting and to lay down their arms. According to Said Abu Rish's biography of Yasser Arafat, Arafat had used the fact that Khalaf had negotiated with King Hussein of Jordan to deflect criticism from himself over the conduct of the fighting between Palestinian guerrillas and the Jordanian army in 1970–71, portraying Khalaf as weak. Some argue that the ridicule his mediation met with was a decisive factor in his turn towards tactics which were considered by his adversaries to be terroristic. Khalaf then felt the need to restore his reputation within the Palestinian community, and became one of the foremost advocates for the terror campaigns conducted by PLO fighters and others during the early 1970s. Christopher Dobson, who met Khalaf in Cairo at this time, described him as someone who would pass unnoticed in a crowd, while topping Israel's most wanted list.

Khalaf met with the U.S. ambassador to Tunis as part of the U.S.-PLO dialogue, a contact that had been authorized by James Baker. He was a man "who had been instrumental in bringing about the shift of PLO policy toward greater pragmatism." Khalaf opposed Arafat's alliance with Saddam Hussein, in so far as, he argued, one could not side with an occupying power when one was fighting in one's own country against an occupation. It was rumoured that he had openly expressed disagreement with the Iraqi leader in face to face meetings, and vouched to stay neutral during the Persian Gulf War in 1991.

== Assassination ==
Khalaf is said to have helped the CIA in an operation to break up the Abu Nidal organization. Defectors who split off were given refuge in Tunis by the PLO. On 14 January 1991, Khalaf was assassinated in the Tunisian home of Abu Hol (Hayel Abdul Hamid, the security head of Fatah), by a Palestinian guard, Hamza Abu Zaid who was a plant from Abu Nidal's group. Zaid shot Khalef in the head, along with Abul Hol and another PLO operative and an aide to Khalaf, Fakhri Al Omari.

Palestinians generally reacted by blaming Abu Nidal for the murder, since he was backed by Iraq, and Zaid later confessed to being in contact with Nidal. While Seale considers Abu Nidal to certainly have been behind the murder, others think the order probably came directly from Saddam Hussein.

A funeral service was held for Khalaf and the other two PLO officials in Tunis with the attendance of Yasser Arafat. Another service was held in Amman where they were buried at the martyr's cemetery.

== Personal life ==
Khalaf married his cousin on 13 July 1959. They had six children: three daughters and three sons.

== Views of Zionism ==
According to Elizabeth Thompson, Khalaf regarded Zionism as an ideology exploited by a political elite which manipulated memories of Nazism in order to create a persecution complex among Jews.

== School naming ==
On 24 September 2016, the Palestinian Authority named a school in Tulkarem after Khalaf. Tulkarem governor Issam Abu Bakr said that the school was named after "martyr Salah Khalaf in order to commemorate the memory of this great national fighter".

== Accusations of involvement in Bologna massacre ==
An Italian public attorney and retired prosecutor—and former director of investigations into the loss of Itavia Flight 870— Judge Rosario Priore argued in a book that Abu Iyad had ordered two German terrorists linked to Venezuelan Carlos the Jackal to carry out the 1980 Bologna massacre (for which three neo-fascists were convicted, including Valerio Fioravanti). The operation was ordered to avenge the break-up of the so-called "lodo Moro", a secret agreement with which Aldo Moro would have guaranteed the free transit of Palestinians guerrillas and terrorists to Italy.

After the arrest of Abu Anzeh Saleh with some missiles destined to Palestinians in 1979, Abu Iyad decided to retaliate, using Czechoslovak explosive provided by Gaddafi's Libya. The explosives were destined to the reinforced walls of Trani's jail, in an action aimed to evade prison for Saleh. Abu Anzeh Saleh was liberated despite having taken less than two years in 1981. Former President of the Italian Republic Francesco Cossiga supported a similar thesis, but he accused George Habash instead of Abu Iyad.

== See also ==
- List of Fatah members
