= Expulsion of Palestinians from Kuwait (1990–91) =

Emigration during and after the Gulf War

The Palestinian expulsion from Kuwait took place during and after the Gulf War. There were approximately 357,000 Palestinians living in Kuwait before the country was invaded by neighbouring Iraq on 2 August 1990. At an emergency summit in Cairo on August 10, twenty Arab League countries drafted a final statement that condemned the Iraqi invasion of Kuwait and supported the United Nations resolutions. Twelve Arab states supported the use of force, and the remaining eight, including the Palestine Liberation Organization (PLO), rejected a military solution to the Iraqi invasion. According to The Washington Post, classified US reports indicated that the PLO leader, Yasser Arafat, pressed Iraqi President Saddam Hussein to make his withdrawal from Kuwait conditional on the withdrawal of Israel from the West Bank, the Gaza Strip and the Golan Heights, and on August 12, Saddam announced his offer to withdraw conditionally. The Kuwaiti government policy which led to this expulsion was a response to the position taken by the PLO.

Operation Desert Storm saw Iraqi forces defeated and pushed out of Kuwait by a coalition led by the United States. More than 287,000 Palestinians were forced by the government to leave Kuwait in March 1991 amid fear of abuse by the Kuwait Armed Forces. Most of the fleeing Palestinians went to Jordan, and limited numbers ended up in Iraq, Israel, the United States, Australia and Canada.

In 2004, relations between the Palestinian leadership and Kuwait improved following an official apology by the PLO leader, Mahmoud Abbas, for the PLO's support of the Iraqi occupation. In 2012, the Palestinian embassy in Kuwait was reopened, and some 80,000 Palestinians lived in the state.

== Background ==
Before the Gulf War, the Palestinian population in Kuwait was 357,000, roughly 18 percent of Kuwait's total population, which was approximately 2 million people.

The Palestinian nationals had come to Kuwait in three different phases: 1948 (the First Arab–Israeli War and the Nakba), 1967 (the Third Arab–Israeli War), and 1973 (the Fourth Arab–Israeli War).

== Events ==
=== Iraqi occupation ===
During the subsequent Iraqi military occupation of Kuwait, some Palestinians fled for various reasons such as fear of persecution, food and medical care shortages, financial difficulties, and fear of arrest or mistreatment at roadblocks by the Iraqi Army.

=== March 1991 expulsion ===
Kuwait's campaign against the Palestinians was a response to the alignment of the Palestinian leader, Yasser Arafat, and his Palestine Liberation Organization with Iraqi President Saddam Hussein, who had earlier invaded Kuwait. On March 14, 1991, 200,000 Palestinians still resided in Kuwait out of the initial 400,000. Palestinians were forced to leave Kuwait during one week in March 1991 after Kuwait was liberated from the Iraqi occupation.

During a single week in March, the Palestinian population of Kuwait had been almost entirely deported out the country, 18 % of Kuwait population was deported. Kuwaitis said that Palestinians leaving the country could move to Jordan, since most Palestinians held Jordanian passports. According to The New York Times, Kuwaitis said the anger against Palestinians was such that there was little chance that those who had left during the seven-month occupation could ever return, and relatively few of those remaining would be able to stay.

== Aftermath ==
Some of the Palestinians who were expelled from Kuwait were Jordanian citizens.

In 2004, Kuwait put off a planned visit by Mahmoud Abbas, the second PLO official after Arafat. Palestinian officials initially denied reports that it had been caused by the PLO's refusal to apologize over its support of the 1990 Iraqi invasion of Kuwait. However, on 12 December 2004, Abbas, who had now become the PLO leader, apologized for the Palestinian leadership's support of Iraq and of Saddam during the invasion and the occupation. On the first visit to Kuwait by a top Palestinian official since the 1990 invasion, Abbas stated, "I say, yes, we apologize to the Kuwait people over our stand toward Kuwait".

In 2012, it was reported that 80,000 Palestinians lived in Kuwait.

== See also ==
- 1948 Palestinian expulsion and flight
- 1991 uprisings in Iraq
