= Adolf Eichmann's capture =

Eichmann's capturing operation

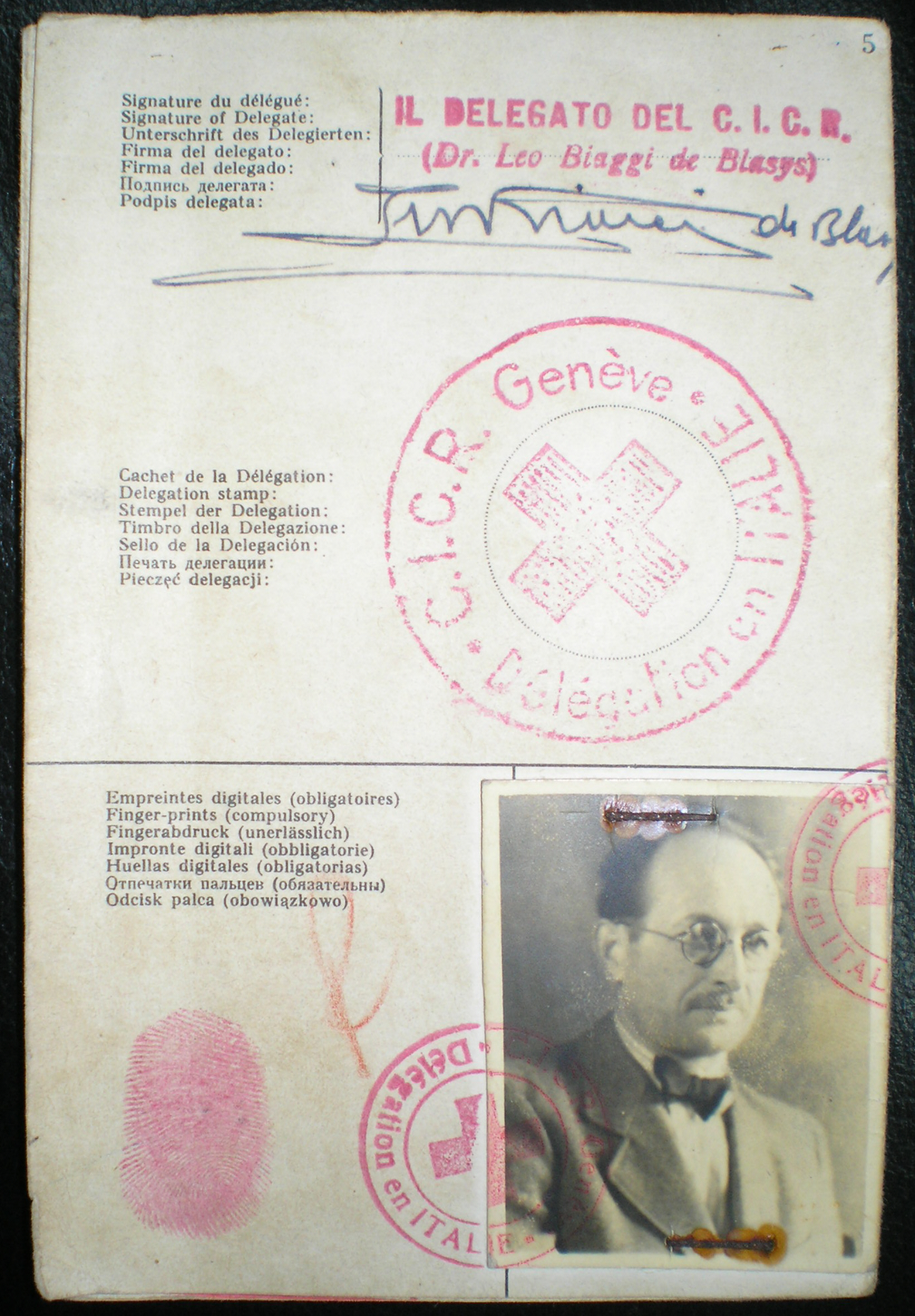
International Committee of the Red Cross identity document with a portrait of A. Eichmann, issued under the name Ricardo Klement, which enabled him to escape to Argentina

Operation Finale (Hebrew: מבצע פינאלה) was conducted by the Israeli intelligence agency Mossad to capture and secretly transport Nazi war criminal Adolf Eichmann from Argentina to Israel in May 1960.

There are several accounts about how Israeli intelligence located Eichmann in Argentina. However, a pivotal role was played by information provided by Lothar Hermann, a German Jew living in Argentina, who suspected that an acquaintance of his daughter Silvia was Eichmann's son. After Hermann's information reached Israeli intelligence services, the head of the Mossad, Isser Harel, personally led the operation in Buenos Aires.

Mossad agents identified Eichmann's residence and placed him under surveillance. On 11 May 1960, agents abducted Eichmann on the street near his home. For nine days, he was secretly held at a villa rented by the agents in a Buenos Aires suburb, and on 20 May, he was transported to Israel on an El Al flight. In 1961, Eichmann was tried and sentenced to death for his crimes against Jews.

The operation was conducted unofficially. Argentina accused Israel of grossly violating its sovereignty. Israel justified the operation's illegality by citing the unprecedented nature of Eichmann's crimes, as he bore direct responsibility for organizing the Holocaust during World War II. Forty years later, Argentina issued an official apology to Holocaust victims for providing refuge to Nazis.

== Background ==
Pursuing and punishing former Nazis was a highly sensitive matter in Israel: much of the country's population had either personally suffered during the Holocaust or had numerous affected relatives, friends, and acquaintances. Approximately 200,000 Israeli residents had survived Nazi concentration camps and ghettos. For Israel, Adolf Eichmann was the "number one" target on the list of wanted Nazis, and his capture was a matter of principle. Eichmann played a significant role in preparing and implementing the Wannsee Conference, and subsequently in executing its resolutions for the "final solution of the Jewish question." He oversaw all operations for the deportation of European Jews to death camps during World War II.

In 1945, Eichmann managed to evade the intelligence services of the Allied countries that defeated Nazi Germany. He fled to Argentina in 1950 and settled in Buenos Aires under the alias Ricardo Klement; his wife and three sons joined him two years later, and a fourth son was born in Argentina.

== Search ==
There are several versions of how Israeli intelligence tracked down Eichmann, based either on the Mossad's narrative or that of Nazi hunter Tuviah Friedman.

=== Lothar Hermann ===
Despite conflicting accounts of Eichmann's discovery, it is undeniable that German Jew Lothar Hermann played a key role in his capture. His marriage to a German woman did not spare him from Nazi persecution. Despite his blindness, Hermann, a former lawyer living in Argentina, remained interested in events related to the search for former Nazis. He was aware that Eichmann was a fugitive and wanted. When he learned that his daughter Silvia had met a young man named Nicholas Eichmann from the Argentine German community, who boasted of his father's service to the Third Reich, Hermann suspected he was Adolf Eichmann's son and reported his suspicions.

Lothar Hermann received the promised reward for Eichmann's capture only in 1972, about a year before his death. When his name was publicized, he faced harassment from local Nazis, and his daughter was forced to flee Argentina for the United States.

=== Mossad's account ===
Lothar Hermann, suspecting that a member of the German community in Buenos Aires was Adolf Eichmann, wrote a letter to the Attorney General of Hesse (FRG) Fritz Bauer. Fritz Bauer passed this information to the Israelis.

According to a 2021 publication by the German newspaper Süddeutsche Zeitung, a German named Gerhard Klammer worked for a time in Argentina as Eichmann's superior. In the autumn of 1959, Klammer encountered Eichmann in Buenos Aires, obtained his address, and informed Bauer through Bishop Hermann Kunst, leading directly to Eichmann's capture.

As described in his book The House on Garibaldi Street, Mossad chief Isser Harel received information from prosecutor Bauer on 19 September 1957 about Eichmann's possible location in Argentina through Dr. Shneer, the head of the Israeli delegation at the reparations negotiations in West Germany. This information reached the Mossad via the Israeli Ministry of Foreign Affairs. According to other sources, Bauer contacted Shaul Darom, a representative of Israeli security services in Frankfurt, and then Government Legal Advisor Haim Cohen. A third version, described by political scientist and expert on Israeli intelligence services Ronen Bergman, states that Bauer, skeptical of prosecuting Eichmann in Germany, deliberately leaked the information to the Mossad by leaving Eichmann's file on his desk during a visit by an Israeli intelligence officer.

=== Tuviah Friedman's account ===
According to another version, Eichmann was tracked down by former Nazi concentration camp prisoner and Yad Vashem employee (until July 1957) Tuviah Friedman. In 1957, Friedman established an independent "Institute for Documentation and Investigation of Nazi Crimes" in Haifa and secured a $10,000 reward (equivalent to $110,000 in 2025) from World Jewish Congress president Nahum Goldmann for information on Eichmann's whereabouts.

Friedman made his first attempt to locate Eichmann in late 1945, together with Asher Ben-Natan, who represented the secret Jewish organization Mossad LeAliyah Bet in Austria. After interrogating arrested SS Sturmbannführer Dieter Wisliceny, Eichmann's friend and aide, they located Eichmann's driver and mistress. An ambush at the mistress's apartment yielded no results. However, they obtained Eichmann's first photograph from her.

In late August 1959, Friedman received a letter from Erwin Schüle, director of the Federal Center for the Investigation of Nazi Crimes in Ludwigsburg, Germany, stating that Eichmann was hiding in Kuwait.

Friedman approached his acquaintance, journalist Moshe Meisels from the newspaper Maariv, proposing to publish this information. According to Friedman, they decided to do so on the eve of Yom Kippur, 11 October 1959, "to stir the conscience of government members and remind them of our duty to the victims".

The topic gained traction, and the article was reprinted or referenced by many publications worldwide. On 12 October 1959, the German-language newspaper Argentinisches Tageblatt, published in Buenos Aires, reprinted the information from the Israeli outlet. On 18 October 1959, Lothar Hermann sent a letter to Tuviah Friedman, stating that Eichmann was not in Kuwait but in Argentina.

In the letter, Hermann wrote:

The report in the German-language newspaper of 12 October 1959 about the Nazi criminal Adolf Eichmann is completely erroneous. This man is not living in Kuwait but in Buenos Aires under an assumed name with his wife and four children. I am ready to assist the institute and provide all information about Eichmann.

Israeli historian and journalist Shimon Briman writes that Friedman exchanged three more letters with Hermann, after which, in December 1959, he connected him with Mossad operatives.

Although most sources do not mention Tuviah Friedman, his name appears in the official Israeli list of participants in Eichmann's capture. The same list includes the name of Simon Wiesenthal, although his role in Eichmann's capture remains unclear and is disputed by both Harel and Friedman.

=== Address ===
The Mossad discovered that Eichmann's wife had remarried a German who had arrived from Argentina and soon left with him. It was hypothesized that she had married Eichmann himself, who had changed his name and passport. Mossad sent agents to Argentina, who confirmed that Ricardo Klement was indeed Eichmann, not another fugitive Nazi.

With Hermann's help, the address where Eichmann's family lived was established: Buenos Aires, Olivos district, Chacabuco Street, 4261. Surveillance was set up at the house. However, agents reported that it was a very poor area, and the house did not seem suitable for a high-ranking Nazi who, according to pursuers, had taken significant funds out of Europe.

In early 1958, Eichmann left the Chacabuco house and disappeared from Israeli sight. By December 1959, Mossad agents in Argentina rediscovered Eichmann's trail. His new address was identified: Buenos Aires, San Fernando district, Garibaldi Street. The house was purchased under the name Veronica Katarina Liebl de Fichmann. This name matched Eichmann's wife's name exactly, except for one letter in the surname (Fichmann instead of Eichmann).

=== Identification ===
Harel decided to send an experienced Shin Bet investigator, Zvi Aharoni, to Argentina. He arrived in Buenos Aires on 29 February 1960, accompanied by four assistants, including the Israeli embassy's military attaché in Argentina, Yitzhak Elron, and his wife Sarah.

Additional confirmation of Eichmann's identity was obtained on 21 March 1960, when a celebration was observed at Klement's house. Reviewing Eichmann's file, the agents determined that this was the day Adolf and Veronica Eichmann were celebrating their 25th wedding anniversary. The ages of his wife and two eldest sons matched those of Vera, Nicholas, and Dieter Eichmann. On 3 April 1960, surveillance operatives managed to secretly photograph Eichmann near his new home. Based on the photographs and information gathered by Zvi Aharoni, it was decided that Eichmann had been reliably identified. However, final confirmation of identity was to be obtained only during the capture operation itself, and Harel began planning Eichmann's abduction.

== Preparation ==
=== Capturing decision ===
Having established Eichmann's location, the Israeli leadership decided to secretly transport him from Argentina to Israel. There was a concern that attempting to secure Eichmann's extradition would lead to his disappearance again.

Post-1945 Argentina became a haven for Nazis. President Juan Perón, sympathetic to Adolf Hitler, not only turned a blind eye to the entry of numerous Germans with forged documents but actively facilitated their escape from Europe. Many former Nazis even found employment in the Argentine Armed Forces.

By the time Perón was overthrown by a military junta in 1955, pro-Nazi sentiments in Argentina's elite, particularly in its security forces, remained strong. The likelihood of Eichmann's extradition was deemed very low by the Israelis, and no one wanted to risk losing the criminal again. Moreover, as Harel noted, Eichmann could be extradited to West Germany, where, 15 years after the war, Nazis were receiving lenient sentences. The Israelis feared that due to a tendency to forgive past crimes, Eichmann might escape justice entirely.

The transporting of Eichmann from Argentina to Israel was personally authorized by Israeli Prime Minister David Ben-Gurion.

=== Planning and preparation ===
Eichmann's capture was personally led by Mossad director Isser Harel. The operational group was headed by Rafi Eitan. All participants were volunteers, and all except Eitan had lost relatives during the war. The operatives were instructed to deliver Eichmann to Israel alive and unharmed.

Planning began in late 1959, with direct preparations starting in April 1960. The following items were sent to four different addresses in Buenos Aires via three different airlines, packaged as innocuous parcels:

- Eight French communication devices with spare batteries;
- Four pairs of British field binoculars;
- Six pocket flashlights;
- A dozen fake license plates;
- Two sets of miniature power tools;
- Three pairs of handcuffs;
- One portable forgery lab;
- Lock-picking tools, including security locks;
- A full set of makeup, including wigs, false teeth, and a beard.

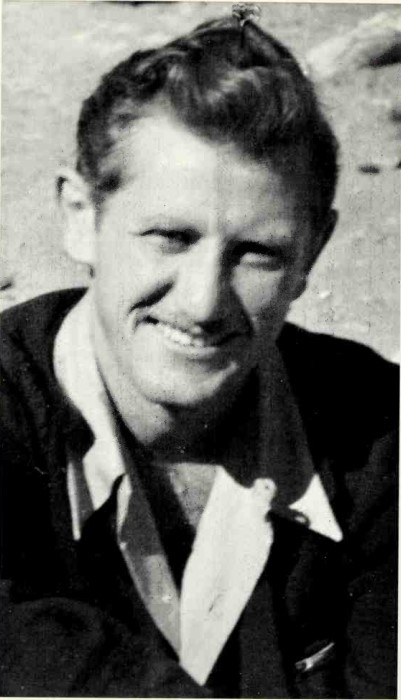
Peter Malkin in 1960 before departing for Argentina

The actual capture of Eichmann was assigned to Peter Malkin, later known as "Agent Seven Forty" and "the man who caught Eichmann." The final briefing for the main operational group in Israel was conducted by Harel on 27 April 1960.

Mossad operatives arrived in Argentina in small groups from different countries at different times. To facilitate these trips, the Mossad even created a front travel agency. The operation was timed to coincide with an official Israeli delegation's visit to Buenos Aires for the 150th anniversary of Argentina's independence. Since Israel had no regular air service to Argentina, it was decided to transport Eichmann on the plane carrying the official delegation, which was scheduled to arrive in Buenos Aires on 19 May and return on 20 May.

On 26 April, the first group of operatives began surveillance of Eichmann. On 29 April, Harel flew to Argentina to lead the operation on-site. A total of 30 people were involved in the operation, with 12 directly engaged in the capture and transport, and the rest providing support and logistics. At Harel's insistence, a woman, Yehudit Nessiyahu, was included in the overseas group as a full-fledged operative for the first time.

In Buenos Aires, Mossad operatives rented several houses and cars, developed a communication system, and worked out the smallest details of the operation, including contingency plans and evacuation in case of failure. By the time of the capture, the group had access to seven properties, including two city apartments rented days before the operation. The initial date for the capture was set by Harel for 10 May. After operatives' feedback, it was postponed by one day.

=== Capture plan ===
Two different capture plans were proposed. According to Zvi Aharoni's plan, Malkin and another agent would wait for Eichmann near his home, with two cars arriving immediately after the capture to whisk him away. Malkin rejected this plan and proposed his own. In his plan, one car would be parked on Garibaldi Street with its hood open, the driver pretending to fix a breakdown. Eichmann, returning from work, would pass directly by it. Malkin would approach Eichmann and meet him near the car. The second car would arrive only after a successful capture.

Malkin argued that if Aharoni's plan failed (e.g., if a local policeman appeared or the cars couldn't approach), the Israelis would end up in an Argentine prison, and Eichmann would disappear, making it impossible to find him again. In Malkin's plan, if Eichmann panicked at the sight of the parked car and fled, the capture would be aborted, and the car would leave. Eichmann would then believe his fears were unfounded, allowing the operation to be attempted differently later. Harel approved Malkin's plan.

== Capture ==
On 11 May, two cars and seven operatives waited for Eichmann to return from work. Eichmann was captured at eight o'clock in the evening on a Buenos Aires street by a Mossad team.

=== Capture team ===
First car:

- Rafi Eitan – operational group commander, later head of the Israeli intelligence agency Lekem.
- Peter Malkin – operative, later head of Mossad's operational department.
- Zvi Aharoni – operative, Shin Bet investigator, driver of the first car.
- Avraham Shalom – deputy commander of the operational group, later head of Shin Bet.

Second car:

- Moshe Tavor – operative, driver of the second car.
- Yaakov Gat – senior operative.
- Yonah Elian – anesthesiologist.

=== Events ===
Eichmann typically arrived home from work by bus at 7:40 p.m. This time, he was not on the bus. He appeared only on the bus arriving at 8:05 p.m. and walked toward his home.

The capture was carried out, as planned, by Peter Malkin. When Eichmann was 10 meters from the ambush, Malkin addressed him in Spanish: "Un momentito, señor!" ("One moment, sir!"), then subdued him with a nelson wrestling hold and knocked him to the ground. Avraham Shalom jumped out of the car and grabbed Eichmann's legs, and together they dragged him into the car. According to Malkin, the capture took just over 20 seconds. No bystanders were nearby. Rafi Eitan claimed Eichmann offered no resistance and merely whimpered.

In the car, Eichmann's mouth was gagged, his hands and feet were bound, dark glasses were placed on him, and he was covered with a blanket. Zvi Aharoni said in German: "One sound, and you're dead" (German: Ein Laut und du bist tot). Eichmann remained still. Both cars drove to one of the Mossad's safe houses. En route, Eitan searched Eichmann for known scars and, finding them, exclaimed, "It's him!"

== Under guard at the villa ==
Eichmann was taken to a villa rented by the operatives in a Buenos Aires suburb. He was thoroughly searched for possible weapons or poison to prevent suicide and examined for distinguishing marks listed in his file. Zvi Aharoni conducted the first interrogation, which confirmed Eichmann's identity with 100% certainty. Eichmann readily provided his SS numbers: 45326 and 63752, and his Nazi Party membership number: 889895. Eichmann admitted he knew who had captured him and, after brief denials, gave his real name. On 13 May, the operatives informed the Israeli government of Eichmann's capture.

To manage the operation's next steps, Harel established a so-called "mobile headquarters". Group members received a list of cafes where meetings were held at specific times, ensuring each location was used only once.

Eichmann spent nine days at the villa under round-the-clock guard. For most of the day, he was handcuffed to a bed, wearing dark glasses to prevent him from seeing his guards' faces. One guard stayed in the room with Eichmann, required to keep constant watch. A second guard was stationed in an adjacent room with an open door. Guards were strictly forbidden from speaking to Eichmann. At night, a guard was posted in the courtyard. An alarm bell was installed in Eichmann's room for the guard to summon help. A car was kept in the courtyard, ready for immediate evacuation if needed. However, Peter Malkin repeatedly violated the no-talking order and detailed his conversations with Eichmann in his autobiographical book Eichmann in My Hands.

Everyone who interacted with Eichmann at the villa had to restrain themselves and each other to avoid showing aggression toward him. Harel notes that the only woman at the villa, who prepared food (Yehudit Nissiyahu), struggled to resist poisoning Eichmann.

For security reasons, entry to and exit from the house were strictly limited. Isser Harel visited Eichmann only on 15 May. He issued new instructions, noting that it was now certain that the captive was Eichmann. If police arrived at the house, Eichmann was to be moved to another location at all costs. If that was not possible, Rafi Eitan was to handcuff himself to Eichmann, discard the key, and inform authorities of Eichmann's identity. Affiliation with the Mossad was to be categorically denied. If detained by police, operatives were to identify themselves as Israeli volunteers.

During this time, intensive interrogations of Eichmann continued. Harel claims that the operatives obtained a voluntary written confession from Eichmann admitting his crimes and agreeing to stand trial in Israel.

I, the undersigned Adolf Eichmann, voluntarily declare: now that my true identity is known, there is no point in trying to evade justice. I agree to go to Israel and stand before a competent court there. It goes without saying that I will receive legal protection and, for my part, will recount the facts related to my final years of service in Germany, concealing nothing, so that future generations may know the true picture of those events. I sign this statement voluntarily. I have been promised nothing and threatened with nothing. I wish, at last, to find inner peace. Since I can no longer recall the past in all its details and sometimes confuse events, I request documents and witnesses to help reconstruct the events. Adolf Eichmann. Buenos Aires, May 1960.

== Transportation to Israel ==
On 19 May, an El Al plane arrived at Buenos Aires airport. The Israelis implemented heightened security measures discreetly. By midday on 20 May, Harel moved the mobile headquarters to the airport, issuing orders to his operatives from a crowded café table until the operation's end.

On the evening of 20 May, Eichmann was sedated and dressed in an Israeli El Al pilot's uniform. He was then taken to the airport and presented to Argentine border officials with a passport in the name of Rafael Arnon. Prior to this, a staged car accident involving Arnon had been arranged, and on 20 May, he was discharged from the hospital with a note stating that "the patient can withstand a flight under medical supervision." Border officials allowed the Israelis to pass, and Eichmann, heavily sedated and unaware of what was happening, could not protest. At midnight, the El Al plane with Eichmann on board departed for Israel.

After Eichmann's disappearance, about 300 Nazis from the German community searched Buenos Aires for him over the course of a week, with their agents monitoring train stations, seaports, and airports. Nevertheless, they found no trace of him. Neither the Argentine police nor Eichmann's relatives could determine his whereabouts.

== Trial and execution ==
Eichmann during his trial in Jerusalem

In Jerusalem, Eichmann was handed over to the police. On 22 May, at a Knesset session, Israeli Prime Minister David Ben-Gurion announced that "Adolf Eichmann is in Israel and will soon be put on trial." A special police unit was formed to investigate Eichmann's case. Upon completion of the investigation, Attorney General Gideon Hausner signed an indictment with 15 counts. Eichmann was charged with war crimes, crimes against the Jewish people, crimes against humanity, and membership in criminal organizations (SS, SD, and Gestapo). The trial began on 11 April 1961. Numerous Holocaust survivors testified, allowing a younger generation of Israelis to engage with this recent chapter of Jewish history for the first time.

On 15 December 1961, Eichmann was found guilty of crimes against the Jewish people, crimes against humanity, and being a war criminal, and sentenced to death. Israeli President Yitzhak Ben-Zvi rejected a plea for clemency, and the sentence was upheld.

Eichmann was hanged on the night of 31 May to 1 June 1962 in a prison in Ramla. In 1954, the Knesset abolished the death penalty for ordinary crimes, retaining it only for exceptional cases such as wartime crimes and participation in genocide. Eichmann's execution was the only application of this law in practice and the second (and last) court-ordered execution in Israel's history. (Note: The first case was the erroneous execution of Meir Tobianski on 30 June 1948. In 1949, Tobianski was posthumously acquitted and awarded the rank of captain.) After the hanging, Eichmann's body was cremated, and his ashes were scattered over the Mediterranean Sea beyond Israel's territorial waters.

== International reaction and consequences ==
After it became known that Eichmann was in Israel, the Argentine government accused Israel of illegal abduction. On 1 June, Argentine Foreign Minister Diógenes Taboada demanded that Israeli Ambassador Arieh Levavi provide full details of the Eichmann case. The ambassador's response note, dated 3 June, was effectively an official attempt by Israel to distance itself from the abduction. According to the note, the capture was described as an action by a "group of volunteers," including some Israeli citizens, who transferred Adolf Eichmann from Argentina to Israeli security services. Additionally, Israel expressed "regret" for any violation of Argentina's sovereign rights resulting from the volunteers' actions. Israel urged Argentina to consider that "a person bearing the greatest responsibility for the murder of millions of the Jewish people, whose volunteers were themselves victims of the massacre, placed their historical mission above all considerations."

On 8 June, Argentina sent another note to Israel, demanding accountability for those involved in violating its sovereignty and the return of Eichmann. In Argentina's view, extradition of Eichmann on charges related to genocide was possible, but such a person could be tried either in Germany, where the crimes occurred, or by an international tribunal. Argentina condemned the crimes of the Nazi regime but argued that this did not absolve Israel of responsibility for violating principles of peaceful coexistence.

On 15 June 1960, Argentina requested an urgent convening of the United Nations Security Council regarding the "violation of the sovereign rights of the Republic of Argentina resulting from the illegal and unlawful transfer of Adolf Eichmann from Argentine territory to the State of Israel." The incident was deemed contrary to the goals and principles of the UN Charter, creating an atmosphere of distrust incompatible with maintaining international peace and security. Argentine intelligence services failed to prove the involvement of Israeli intelligence. However, Resolution No. 138 of the UN Security Council, dated 23 June 1960, indicated that the Israeli government was at least aware of and had approved the plan to abduct Eichmann in Argentina. While all speakers supported upholding Argentina's sovereignty, some delegations, notably the USSR and Poland, abstained from voting. The Soviet representative noted that Western countries had essentially evaded their wartime commitments to prosecute and punish war criminals, some of whom found refuge in Argentina. Explaining Poland's abstention, its representative stated that the resolution "does not provide [...] a clear approach to the second issue, namely the future fate of Eichmann [...] The ambiguity of the wording could lead to interpretations that might serve the interests of Eichmann himself or other war criminals, wherever they may be." Poland also argued that, while the actions related to Eichmann's detention violated international law, they did not constitute a threat to international peace and security.

Many researchers, while disapproving of Israel's actions from a legal perspective, generally agreed that there were compelling reasons to justify bringing Eichmann to trial. In particular, Karl Jaspers noted that, although the arrest in Argentina violated international law, it was undoubtedly justified from moral and political perspectives.

Another consequence of Eichmann's abduction was widespread panic among Nazis hiding in Argentina. Notably, after Eichmann's disappearance, one of the most brutal tormentors of Auschwitz prisoners, Josef Mengele, known as the "Angel of Death," fled to Paraguay and then Brazil. Mossad operatives had tracked Mengele in Buenos Aires, but capturing him simultaneously with or immediately after Eichmann was deemed too risky. Subsequently, Mossad resources were diverted to the so-called "Yossele Schumacher affair," allowing Mengele to cover his tracks.

The English-language Jordanian newspaper Jerusalem Times published a letter on 24 April 1961 claiming that through Eichmann, "a blessing descended upon humanity" and expressing confidence that "the trial will one day end with the liquidation of the remaining six million to avenge your blood".

Exactly 40 years later, on 15 June 2000, Argentine President Fernando de la Rúa, during an official visit to the United States, offered his "deepest and most sincere apologies" to all Holocaust victims for his country's provision of refuge to Nazis after World War II. De la Rúa promised that the Argentine government would investigate how Nazi criminals entered the country and that all guilty Nazis would be punished.

In the USSR, Eichmann's capture was covered sparingly, largely in the context of criticizing the West (including Israel) for insufficiently pursuing Nazis. Soviet media portrayed Israel as a dependent entity allegedly complying with West Germany's demands to prevent the exposure of other Nazi criminals; Zionist leadership was accused of making a "bloody deal with the successors of Adolf Hitler, Bonn's revanchists," thereby betraying the memory of millions of victims. The Eichmann trial was seen in the USSR as an opportunity to prosecute Nazis responsible for war crimes against civilians on Soviet territory, emphasizing the USSR's interest in Eichmann as responsible for the deaths of millions of Soviet citizens. Israel's right to try Eichmann was questioned only in certain media outlets.

== Legacy ==
In 2006, declassified U.S. archives revealed that on 19 March 1958, the CIA received information from West German intelligence (BND) about Eichmann's location and alias. The CIA and BND decided to withhold this information, fearing that Eichmann might reveal the Nazi past of Hans Globke, then head of Chancellor Konrad Adenauer's secretariat.

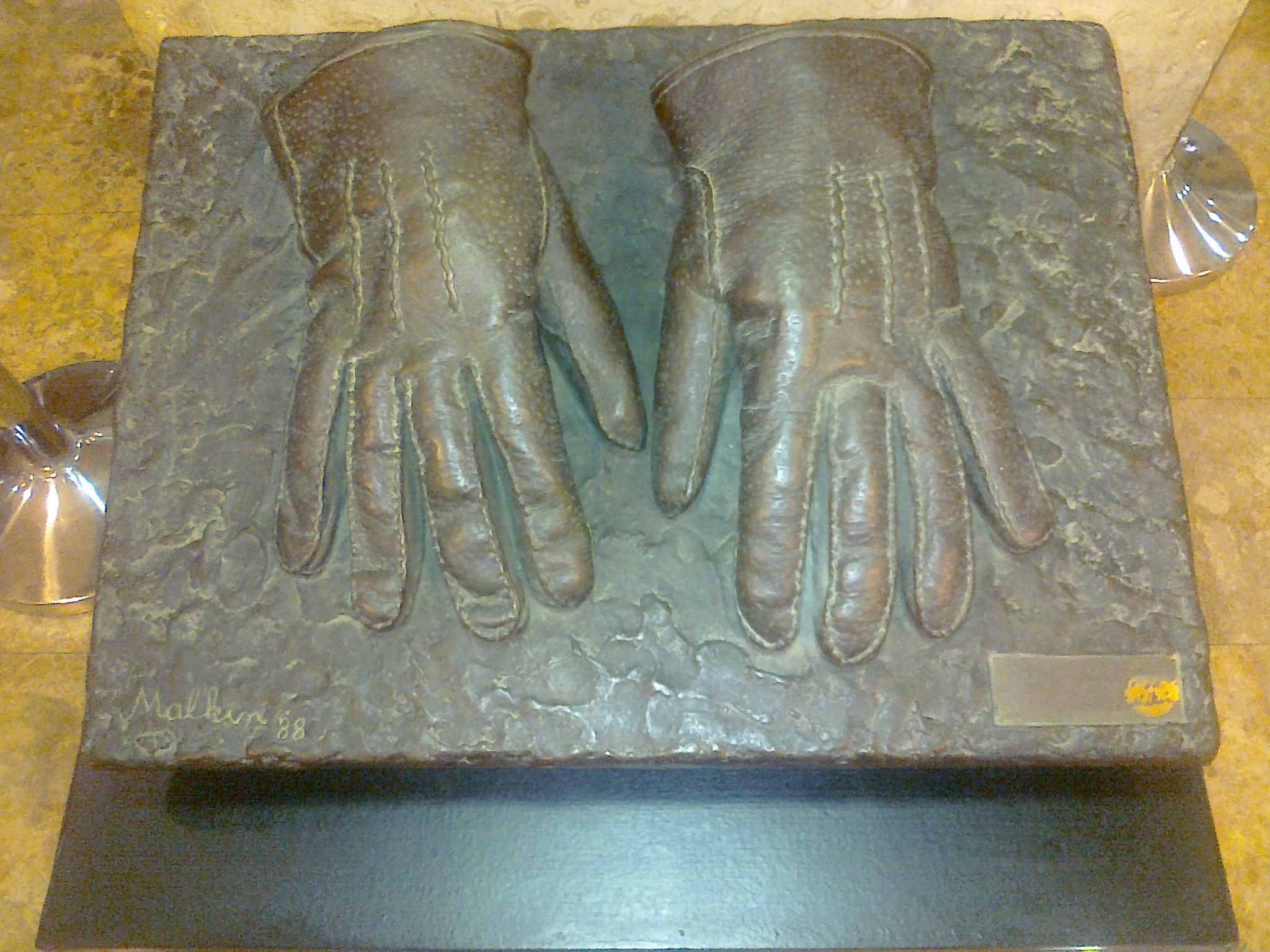
Peter Malkin's gloves

At one point, the Museum of Jewish Heritage in New York City displayed a bronze cast of the gloves worn by Peter Malkin during Eichmann's abduction. Malkin said he was repulsed by the idea of touching Eichmann with bare hands.

In May 2007, Eichmann's passport, issued under the name Ricardo Klement, was transferred to the Holocaust Museum in Buenos Aires as an exhibit. The passport was found in a Buenos Aires court archive, where it had been submitted by Eichmann's wife to the police in May 1960 when reporting her husband's disappearance.

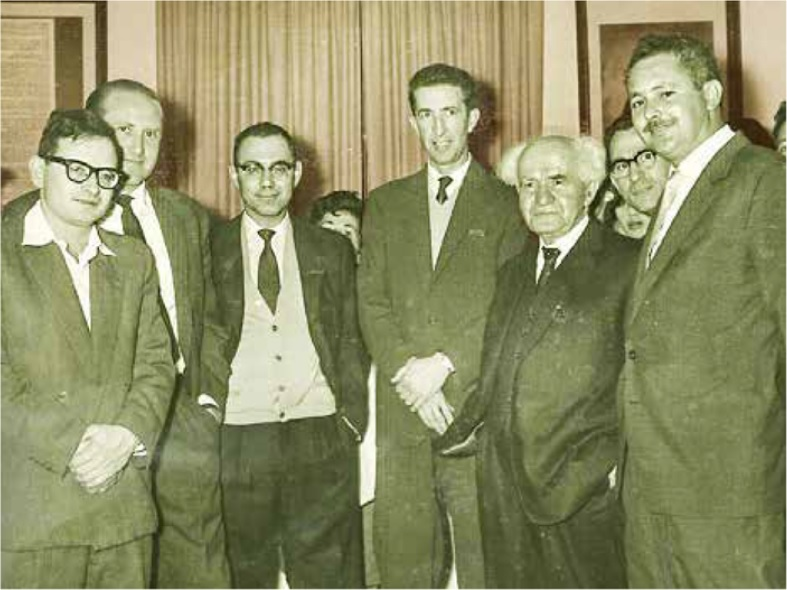
Israeli prime minister David Ben-Gurion with participants in the Eichmann capture operation. From left to right: Rafi Eitan, Peter Malkin, Avraham Shalom. Photo taken approximately in the first half of the 1970s

Official acknowledgment that Eichmann was abducted by Mossad agents, not "Jewish volunteers," came only in February 2005. The full list of participants in the abduction was published only in January 2007. The name of the anesthesiologist who participated in the operation was declassified in April 2007.

On 26 June 2007, Israel's acting president Dalia Itzik presented certificates of honor and commemorative gifts to the operation's participants. By then, three direct participants— Peter Malkin, Moshe Tavor, and Shalom Dani— had died.

On 12 December 2011, a Knesset exhibition in Jerusalem, attended by Israeli Prime Minister Benjamin Netanyahu, was opened to commemorate the Eichmann capture operation. The exhibition featured unique artifacts and newly declassified Mossad documents from the state archive related to Eichmann's detention in Argentina and his trial in Israel. Among the items displayed were: David Ben-Gurion's order to capture Eichmann, the court's verdict, the special anesthetic syringe used in the abduction, Mossad agents' passports, tickets, and gloves, and the glass chamber in which Eichmann was held during the trial.

== In literature and film ==
In 1961, while Eichmann was still in an Israeli prison, the U.S. released the feature film Operation Eichmann directed by R.G. Springsteen. Eichmann was played by Werner Klemperer.

That same year, Tuviah Friedman, in collaboration with editor David Gross, published an autobiographical book, The Hunter, first in Yiddish and later in English. It was reissued in 2007. In 1961, the book The Capture of Adolf Eichmann by Moshe Pearlman was published in Tel Aviv in Hebrew and in London in English. In 2001, Pearlman's book Как был пойман Адольф Эйхман was published in Russian.

Isser Harel wrote about these events in the book The House on Garibaldi Street (Hebrew: הבית ברחוב גריבלדי, תל אביב: ספריית מעריב). It was published in Russian as Похищение палача (The Abduction of the Executioner) in 1992. A 1979 film, The House on Garibaldi Street, was based on this book, starring Chaim Topol and Martin Balsam. Since Mossad operatives were not officially declassified at the time of writing, Harel used pseudonyms in the book. For example, Rafi Eitan appears as "Gabi," Peter Malkin as "Eli," Zvi Aharoni as "Kenet," and so on. The only agent referred to by his real name was document forgery specialist Shalom Dani, who died in 1963.

In 1990, Peter Malkin, in collaboration with American writer Harry Stein, published the book Eichmann in My Hands. In 1996, a TV movie, The Man Who Captured Eichmann, was made based on this book, with Robert Duvall as Eichmann and Arliss Howard as Malkin, who also consulted on the film. In Malkin's book, operational group members also appear under pseudonyms different from those in Harel's book (Rafi Eitan as "Uzi," Zvi Aharoni as "Hans," etc.).

In 1990, Tuviah Friedman published a collection of documents titled My Role in Operation Eichmann.

In 1996, Zvi Aharoni, together with German writer Wilhelm Dietl, released the book Der Jäger – Operation Eichmann.

In 2006, a four-part documentary series directed by Fyodor Stukov, Hunters for Nazis, was released in Russia, focusing on Tuviah Friedman's activities.

The Eichmann abduction is indirectly related to numerous other works. For example, the 2007 feature film The Debt depicts three young Mossad agents searching for a surviving Nazi criminal in Europe. Miramax produced a remake of this film, also titled The Debt, in 2009, starring Helen Mirren. The film was released in August 2011 after the studio's closure.

In August 2018, the film Operation Finale was released, depicting Eichmann's capture, with Ben Kingsley playing Eichmann.

== Bibliography ==
- Johnson, Paul (2001). Популярная история евреев [A History of the Jews]. Historical Literature (in Russian). Translated by Zotov, I. L. Moscow: Veche. p. 672. ISBN 978-5-7838-0668-1.
- Bar-Zohar, Michael; Mishal, Nissim (2023). Амазонки Моссада. Женщины в израильской разведке [The Mossad Amazons: Women in Israeli Intelligence] (in Russian). Moscow: Kolibri. p. 282. ISBN 978-5-389-20207-8.
- Доклад Комиссии Генеральной ассамблее о работе её пятьдесят третьей сессии. Ежегодник Комиссии международного права 2001 [Report of the Commission to the General Assembly on the Work of Its Fifty-Third Session. Yearbook of the International Law Commission 2001] (PDF) (in Russian). Vol. II, Part Two. United Nations. 2007.
- Kantorovich, Nati (2009). "Реакция на процесс Эйхмана в Советском Союзе: попытка предварительного анализа, 1960 - 1965 годы" [Reaction to the Eichmann Trial in the Soviet Union: A Preliminary Analysis, 1960–1965]. Yad Vashem: Studies. Part 1 (in Russian). Yad Vashem.
- Raviv, Dan; Melman, Yossi (2000). История разведывательных служб Израиля [Every Spy a Prince: The Complete History of Israel's Intelligence Community]. Secret Missions (in Russian). Moscow: International Relations. p. 528. ISBN 978-5-7133-1021-9.
- Safarov, A. N. (2022). "Правосудие от имени шести миллионов обвинителей: дело «The Attorney General of the Government of Israel v. Adolf Eichmann» в контексте международного права" [Justice on behalf of six million accusers: The Attorney General of the Government of Israel v. Adolf Eichmann in the context of international law]. Московский журнал международного права (in Russian) (4): 70–107. doi:10.24833/0869-0049-2021-4-70-107. ISSN 2619-0893.
- Harel, Isser (1992). Похищение палача [The Capture of the Executioner] (in Russian). Kyiv: SP Compass. p. 255. ISBN 978-5-7128-0004-9.
- Bergman, Ronen (2018). Rise and Kill First: The Secret History of Israel's Targeted Assassinations. New York: Random House. p. 784. ISBN 978-1-4000-6971-2.
- Malkin, Peter (1990). Eichmann in My Hands. New York: Warner Books. p. 272. ISBN 0-446-51418-7.
- Abos, Alvaro (2007). Eichmann en Argentina [Eichmann in Argentina] (in Spanish). Argentina: Edhasa. p. 354. ISBN 978-950-9009-91-2.
