= Operation Finale =

2018 film directed by Chris Weitz

- Theatrical release poster
- Directed by: Chris Weitz
- Written by: Matthew Orton
- Produced by: Fred Berger; Oscar Isaac; Brian Kavanaugh-Jones; Jason Spire
- Starring: Oscar Isaac; Ben Kingsley; Mélanie Laurent; Lior Raz; Nick Kroll; Haley Lu Richardson
- Cinematography: Javier Aguirresarobe
- Edited by: Pamela Martin
- Music by: Alexandre Desplat
- Production companies: Metro-Goldwyn-Mayer Pictures; Automatik Entertainment
- Distributed by: Metro-Goldwyn-Mayer Pictures (United States); Netflix (International)
- Release date: August 29, 2018 (United States)
- Running time: 123 minutes
- Country: United States
- Language: English
- Budget: $22 million
- Box office: $18 million

Operation Finale is a 2018 American historical drama thriller film directed by Chris Weitz from a screenplay by Matthew Orton about a 1960 clandestine operation by Israeli commandos to capture former SS officer Adolf Eichmann, and transport him to Jerusalem for trial on charges of crimes against humanity. The film stars Oscar Isaac (who also produced) as the Mossad officer Peter Malkin, and Ben Kingsley as Eichmann, with Lior Raz, Mélanie Laurent, Nick Kroll, and Haley Lu Richardson. Several source materials, including Eichmann in My Hands, by Peter Malkin and Harry Stein, provided the basis for the story.

The film was theatrically released in the United States on August 29, 2018, by Metro-Goldwyn-Mayer through their joint venture with Annapurna Pictures (now called United Artists Releasing) and received mixed reviews from critics.

== Plot ==
After World War II ends, Holocaust perpetrator Adolf Eichmann disappears; other leaders of Nazi Germany take their own lives to avoid facing trials for war crimes. In 1954, Mossad agent Peter Malkin mistakenly kills the wrong person while hunting a Nazi war criminal in Austria, damaging his reputation.

In Buenos Aires, Argentina, in 1960, Sylvia Hermann begins courting the son of Adolf Eichmann, Klaus. At dinner with her German-Jewish father, Lothar, Klaus openly speaks negatively about Jews and claims his father died in the war. Lothar grows suspicious and passes his name along to Mossad in Tel Aviv, Israel. Field agent Zvi Aharoni is dispatched in Buenos Aires to gather intelligence. Klaus takes Sylvia to a meeting, which turns out to be a Nazi revival led by Carlos Fuldner, which Eichmann also attends. Sylvia abruptly leaves after the guests erupt in a Sieg Heil chant.

Now working in coordination with Mossad, Sylvia meets the Eichmann family at their home under the guise of reconciling with Klaus. An argument between her and Klaus causes Eichmann (living under the name Ricardo Klement and claiming to be Klaus's uncle) to intervene; Klaus accidentally refers to him as his father and Eichmann is subsequently photographed by a Mossad agent. Eichmann notices the operative taking his photo and sketches him.

The Mossad team uses the evidence from the meeting to confirm Eichmann's identity and plan his capture – they intend to disguise themselves as an El Al air crew and fly him out while he is sedated. Peter and his ex-girlfriend Hanna, a doctor, are brought on to the team with her role to keep Eichmann sedated during their travels. The team coordinates and captures Eichmann outside of his home. While his family and friends try to discern if his disappearance is due to someone discovering his true identity, Eichmann admits his identity to his captors. Meanwhile, the agents learn their return flight has been delayed by ten days. Furthermore, they are informed the airline will not agree to transport Eichmann unless he signs an affidavit stating he will willingly go to Israel; he refuses to sign because he does not believe he will get a fair trial. The team's interrogator is not able to get through to Eichmann and tensions rise among the team; some wish to outright kill Eichmann. Peter eventually obtains the signature after sharing his personal story of the loss of his sister Fruma and her three young children to the Holocaust and listening to Eichmann's story about being ignorant of the actual killing of the Jews, claiming his job was focused exclusively on logistics and he was just "following orders".

During the plane's delay and while they await Eichmann's capitulation, Klaus and the Argentine police increasingly investigate Eichmann's disappearance, distributing the sketch of the operative to the public. After using US dollars instead of Argentine pesos, one of Mossad's local contacts is captured and tortured until she reveals the location of the safehouse. As the Mossad team prepare to leave, Eichmann drops his polite façade and tells Peter a horrific story of watching 5,000 Jews murdered in a pit by the Einsatzgruppen, cruelly wondering aloud if one of them (a woman who had begged Eichmann to save her infant) was Peter's sister.

With the Nazis and police bearing down on them, the rest of the team is forced to drastically alter their escape plan, resulting in two operatives having to be left behind. The police also confiscate the plane's landing permits, grounding it. Peter hand-delivers a copy of the permit to air traffic control and, seeing the police closing in, orders the plane to take off without him.

In Israel, all the operatives reunite at Eichmann's trial which was televised globally. In the epilogue, it is revealed that Eichmann is found guilty and hanged in 1962. Testimony in the trial from survivors of the Nazi death machine was the first time the world heard directly from them. Peter has a successful career and long life, dying in 2005.

== Cast ==
- Oscar Isaac as Peter Malkin
- Ben Kingsley as Adolf Eichmann
- Mélanie Laurent as Hanna Elian (based on Yonah Elian)
- Lior Raz as Isser Harel
- Nick Kroll as Rafi Eitan
- Michael Aronov as Zvi Aharoni
- Haley Lu Richardson as Sylvia Hermann
- Joe Alwyn as Klaus Eichmann
- Michael Benjamin Hernandez as Dani Shalom
- Greg Hill as Moshe Tabor
- Ohad Knoller as Ephraim Ilani
- Torben Liebrecht as Yaakov Gat
- Simon Russell Beale as David Ben-Gurion
- Pepê Rapazote as Carlos Fuldner
- Greta Scacchi as Vera Eichmann
- Peter Strauss as Lothar Hermann

== Production ==
On November 16, 2015, it was announced that Metro-Goldwyn-Mayer had bought an untitled script from Matthew Orton, about the team who found and captured Adolf Eichmann. Brian Kavanaugh-Jones co-produced the film through his production company Automatik. On February 24, 2016, Chris Weitz was reported as being in talks to direct the film.

A deal was struck in March 2017 that saw Oscar Isaac co-produce and star in the film, taking on the role of Peter Malkin. Chris Weitz was set as director. In June, Ben Kingsley was cast as Adolf Eichmann. In August, Lior Raz joined the production, and in September, Mélanie Laurent, Nick Kroll, Joe Alwyn, Michael Aronov, and Haley Lu Richardson were cast, with filming to begin in Argentina on October 1. The cast was rounded out on October 12, and filming was underway in Argentina. Peter Strauss also joined the cast, on November 30.

A clip from the 1959 Douglas Sirk film Imitation of Life featuring actress Susan Kohner is featured near the beginning of this film. Kohner is the mother of this film's director Chris Weitz.

== Release ==
Operation Finale was originally scheduled to be released on September 14, 2018. However, in July 2018, the film was moved up to August 29, 2018, in the U.S., due to high test screening scores, and to avoid the crowded September field. The film was released outside of the United States on October 3, 2018, by Netflix and later added to Netflix US in February 2021.

The film was released on Blu-ray and Digital HD on December 4, 2018 by Universal Pictures Home Entertainment.

== Reception ==
=== Box office ===
In the United States, Operation Finale was projected to gross $8–10 million from 1,810 theaters during its four-day Labor Day opening weekend. The film made $1 million on its first day and $725,891 on its second. It went on to gross $6 million over Friday to Sunday, for a four-day weekend total of $7.8 million, and a six-day total of $9.5 million, finishing fifth at the box office. In its second weekend, the film dropped 50% to $3 million, finishing eighth.

=== Critical response ===
On review aggregator Rotten Tomatoes, the film holds an approval rating of 60% based on 133 reviews, with an average rating of 6.1/10. The website's critical consensus reads, "Operation Finale is well-intentioned, well-acted, and overall entertaining, even if the depth and complexity of the real-life events depicted can get a little lost in their dramatization." On Metacritic, the film has a weighted average score of 58 out of 100, based on 33 critics, indicating "mixed or average reviews". Audiences polled by CinemaScore gave the film an average grade of "A−" on an A+ to F scale, while PostTrak reported filmgoers gave it an 86% positive score and a 65% "definite recommend".

The New York Times' A. O. Scott gave the film a positive review, "It's a story very worth telling, told pretty well, with self-evident virtues and obvious limitations. Viewers who see it out of a sense of duty will find some pleasure in the bargain. Call it the banality of good."

CNN's Thane Rosenbaum calls it "finely directed" and "no ordinary spy thriller", noting that the Israeli operation surely influenced espionage films during the cold war, and considers it surprising that it has received such "scant cinematic attention .. until now". Rosenbaum notes that by giving a humanized rather than a monstrous portrayal of Eichmann, the film adopts Hannah Arendt's premise of the banality of evil.

In his review for The Hollywood Reporter, John DeFore called the film "a lively historical thriller" and wrote, "Though not likely to enter the pantheon as either a true-life caper (Argo's people-smuggling was more exciting; Munich's tale of vengeance more affecting) or as a showcase for face-the-past mind games, the drama benefits from a strong cast and can easily replace 1996's The Man Who Captured Eichmann as the go-to dramatization of this episode."

== See also ==
- List of American films of 2018
- List of Holocaust films
- Eichmann Before Jerusalem, about his life in Argentina
- Eichmann in Jerusalem, Hannah Arendt's account of Eichmann's trial
- The House on Garibaldi Street, 1979 US made-for-TV film based on Harel's memoir of the operation.
- The Man Who Captured Eichmann, 1996 US TV movie
- The Eichmann Show, 2015 BBC TV film on the broadcasting of the Eichmann trial
