= Aliza Magen =

Israeli intelligence officer (1937–2025)

- עליזה מגן
- Born: Aliza Halevi; 5 July 1937; Jerusalem, Mandatory Palestine
- Died: 14 April 2025 (aged 87); Jerusalem, Israel
- Spouse: Avraham Magen (died 2011)
- Military career
- Allegiance: Israel
- Branch: Mossad
- Service years: 1958–1999
- Rank: Deputy Director

Aliza Magen (Hebrew: עליזה מגן; 5 July 1937 – 14 April 2025) was an Israeli intelligence officer. She served in the Mossad, Israel's national intelligence agency, for over 40 years from 1958 to 1999, participating in hundreds of covert operations, including Operation Damocles, Operation Diamond, and Operation Wrath of God.

In 1990, she was named the Mossad's deputy director, becoming the highest-ranking woman in the agency's history. She served in this position under three Mossad directors until her retirement in 1999.

== Early life ==
Magen was born to German immigrants in Mandatory Palestine on 5 July 1937 and grew up in the Rehavia neighborhood of Jerusalem. She married Avraham Magen, who died in 2011. The couple had no children.

== Career ==
After joining the Mossad in 1958, she became involved in hundreds of covert operations in Israel and abroad. In the 1960s, she participated in Operation Damocles for which she was sent to Salzburg, Austria, in 1962 to recruit a German scientist who was working for Egyptian President Gamal Abdel Nasser. She later worked at the Mossad station in Germany. Magen also participated in Operation Diamond, the Mossad operation to recruit Iraqi pilot Munir Redfa.

According to Magen, her reports attracted the attention of then-director Isser Harel. Harel assigned Magen and Mossad officer Yehudit Nessyahu to locate Yossele Schumacher, who had been abducted by his Haredi Orthodox Jewish grandparents. Magen-Halevi convinced Ruth Ben David, who had smuggled Schumacher out of Israel, to reveal Schumacher's location. She was also involved in Operation Wrath of God, the Mossad's retaliation campaign after the 1972 Munich massacre.

In 1980, Magen was appointed deputy head of the Tzomet Branch, then became head of the Administration Branch in 1984. Magen-Halevi was appointed deputy director of the Mossad in 1990 and served under three successive Mossad directors: Shabtai Shavit, Danny Yatom, and Efraim Halevy. As deputy director, Magen took part in planning for a failed assassination of Hamas leader Khaled Meshaal and approved the operation to install bugging devices in the Switzerland apartment of Hezbollah fundraiser Abdullah Zein.

She was publicly identified by the first letter of her name in a profile run by Yediot Ahronot as part of Israel's newspaper wars of the 1990s. She was asked to stay on as deputy director when Efraim Halevy was appointed director in March 1998. She retired the following year.

Magen was among the female Mossad operatives profiled by Israeli journalists Michael Bar-Zohar and Nissim Mishal in their 2021 book The Mossad Amazons.

== Death and legacy ==
Magen died in Jerusalem on 14 April 2025, at the age of 87.

Upon her death, the Mossad released a statement saying, "The Mossad family bows its head in deep sorrow over the loss of our comrade Aliza – a respected, trailblazing and dedicated commander who devoted her life to the security of Israel and its citizens. Aliza was one of the pillars of the Mossad, and she left a profound mark on generations of agency personnel, who were trained according to her legacy and values."
