= The Man Who Captured Eichmann =

1996 television film directed by William Graham

- Film poster
- Based on: Eichmann in My Hands by: Peter Malkin; Harry Stein
- Written by: Lionel Chetwynd
- Directed by: William Graham
- Starring: Robert Duvall; Arliss Howard
- Composer: Laurence Rosenthal
- Country of origin: United States
- Original language: English

Production
- Executive producers: Robert Duvall; Stan Margulies
- Producer: Raúl Outeda
- Production locations: Buenos Aires, Argentina
- Cinematography: Robert Steadman
- Editor: Drake Silliman
- Running time: 96 minutes
- Production companies: Butcher's Run Films; Stan Margulies Company; Turner Pictures

Original release
- Network: TNT
- Release: November 10, 1996

The Man Who Captured Eichmann is a 1996 American historical drama television film directed by William Graham and written by Lionel Chetwynd, based on the 1990 book Eichmann in My Hands by Peter Malkin and Harry Stein. The film stars Robert Duvall as Nazi war criminal Adolf Eichmann, who lived under the name Ricardo Klement in Buenos Aires, Argentina, and Arliss Howard as Israeli Mossad agent Peter Malkin, who kidnapped Eichmann in 1960.

The Man Who Captured Eichmann premiered on TNT on November 10, 1996. The film received positive reviews from critics, with Duvall being nominated for a Primetime Emmy Award and a Screen Actors Guild Award for his performance.

== Plot ==
Set in 1960, the story follows the efforts of the Mossad, the Israeli Secret Service, to find former SS Colonel Adolf Eichmann, who fled Germany for Argentina and took the name Ricardo Klement. He was wanted for the mass murder of both Jews and non-Jews in Europe during the Holocaust. Learning of Eichmann's living in Argentina, the Mossad sends a team to capture him, led by agent Peter Malkin. The standing order is to bring Eichmann back alive to Israel for trial.

The film ends with the take-off of the El Al aircraft taking Eichmann to face trial in Jerusalem.

== Cast ==
- Robert Duvall as Adolf Eichmann/Ricardo Klement
- Arliss Howard as Peter Malkin
- Jeffrey Tambor as Isser Harel
- Jack Laufer as Uzi
- Nicolas Surovy as Hans
- Joel Brooks as Meir
- Michael Laskin as Dr. Klein
- Sam Robards as David
- Michael Tucci as Danny
- Rusty Schwimmer as Rosa
- Jean Pierre Reguerraz as Laszlo Ungari
- Celina Font as Angela Ungari
- Erika Wallner as Catalina Klement
- Kevin Schiele as Nicolas Klement
- Gregory Dayton as Muller
- Marcelo Sycz as Dieter Klement
- Brian Hussey as Hasse Klement
- Marcos Woinsky as Abba Eban

== Release ==
The film premiered on TNT on November 10, 1996. It was released on VHS and DVD by Warner Home Video.

== Awards and nominations ==
| Year | Award | Category | Recipient | Result | Ref. |
|---|---|---|---|---|---|
| 1997 | 47th Eddie Awards | Best Edited Two-Hour Movie for Commercial Television | Drake Silliman | Won | |
| 1997 | 3rd Screen Actors Guild Awards | Outstanding Performance by a Male Actor in a Miniseries or Television Movie | Robert Duvall | Nominated | |
| 1997 | 49th Primetime Emmy Awards | Outstanding Lead Actor in a Miniseries or a Special | Robert Duvall | Nominated | |
| 1997 | 49th Primetime Emmy Awards | Outstanding Single-Camera Picture Editing for a Miniseries or a Special | Drake Silliman | Nominated | |
| 1997 | 13th Artios Awards | Best Casting for Movie of the Week | Iris Grossman | Nominated | |
| 1997 | 19th CableACE Awards | Best Actor in a Miniseries or Movie | Robert Duvall | Nominated | |
| 1997 | 19th CableACE Awards | Best Supporting Actor in a Movie or Miniseries | Arliss Howard | Nominated | |
| 1997 | 19th CableACE Awards | Best Writing a Movie or Miniseries | Lionel Chetwynd | Nominated | |

== See also ==
- Adolf Eichmann's capture
