= Reuven Shiloah =

Director of Mossad from 1949 to 1953

- ראובן שילוח
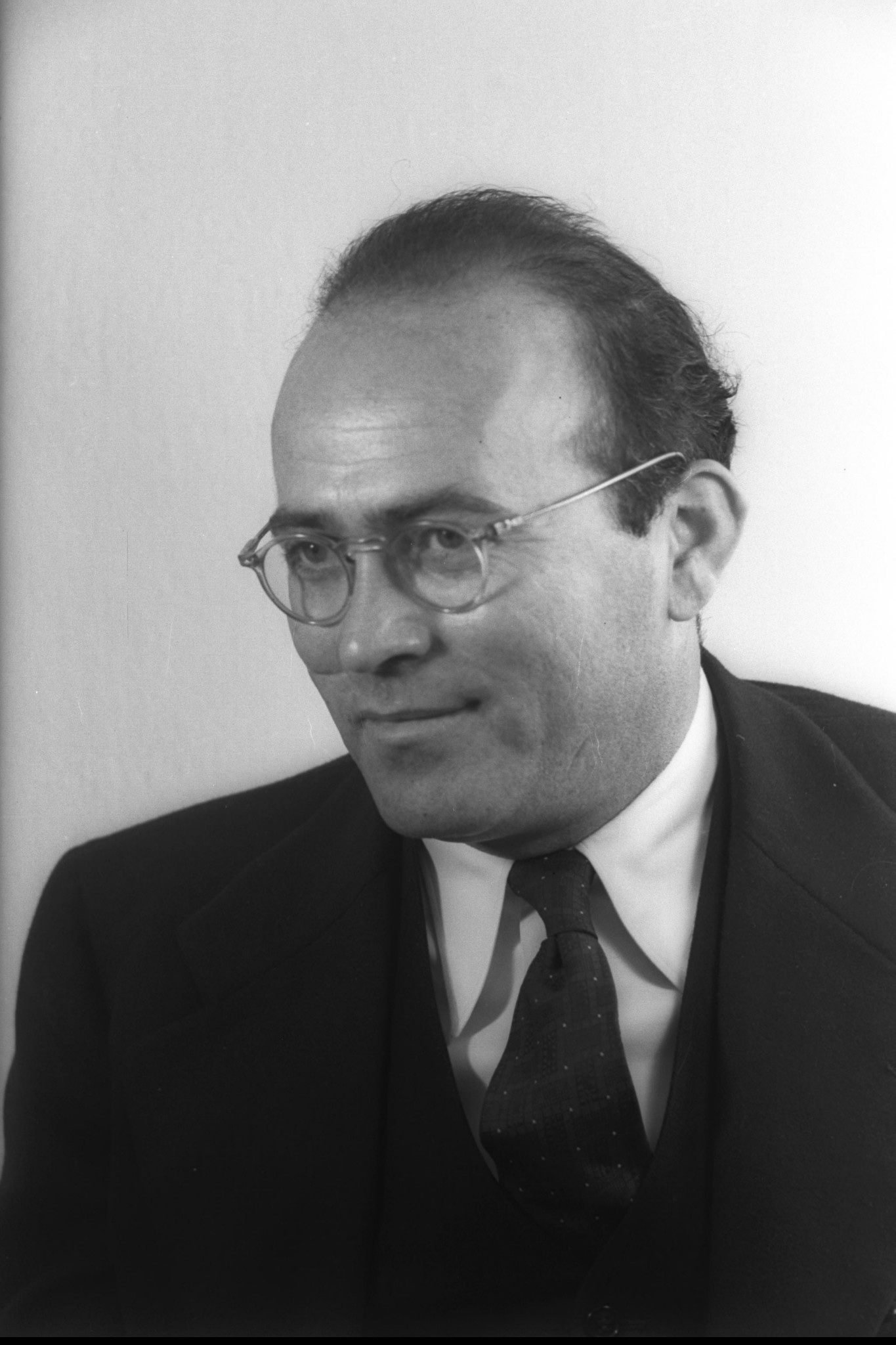
- Born: December 20, 1909; Jerusalem, Ottoman Empire
- Died: May 10, 1959 (aged 49); Jerusalem, Israel
- Occupation: Director of Mossad
- Awards: Medal of Courage
- Espionage activity
- Allegiance: State of Israel
- Service branch: Mossad
- Service years: 1949–1952

Reuven Shiloah (Hebrew: ראובן שילוח; born Zaslansky, later shortened to Zaslani; Shiloah was his underground alias; December 20, 1909 – May 10, 1959) was a leader of the Israeli Intelligence Community and one of its founders. He was the founder and the first head of Mossad.

== Early life ==
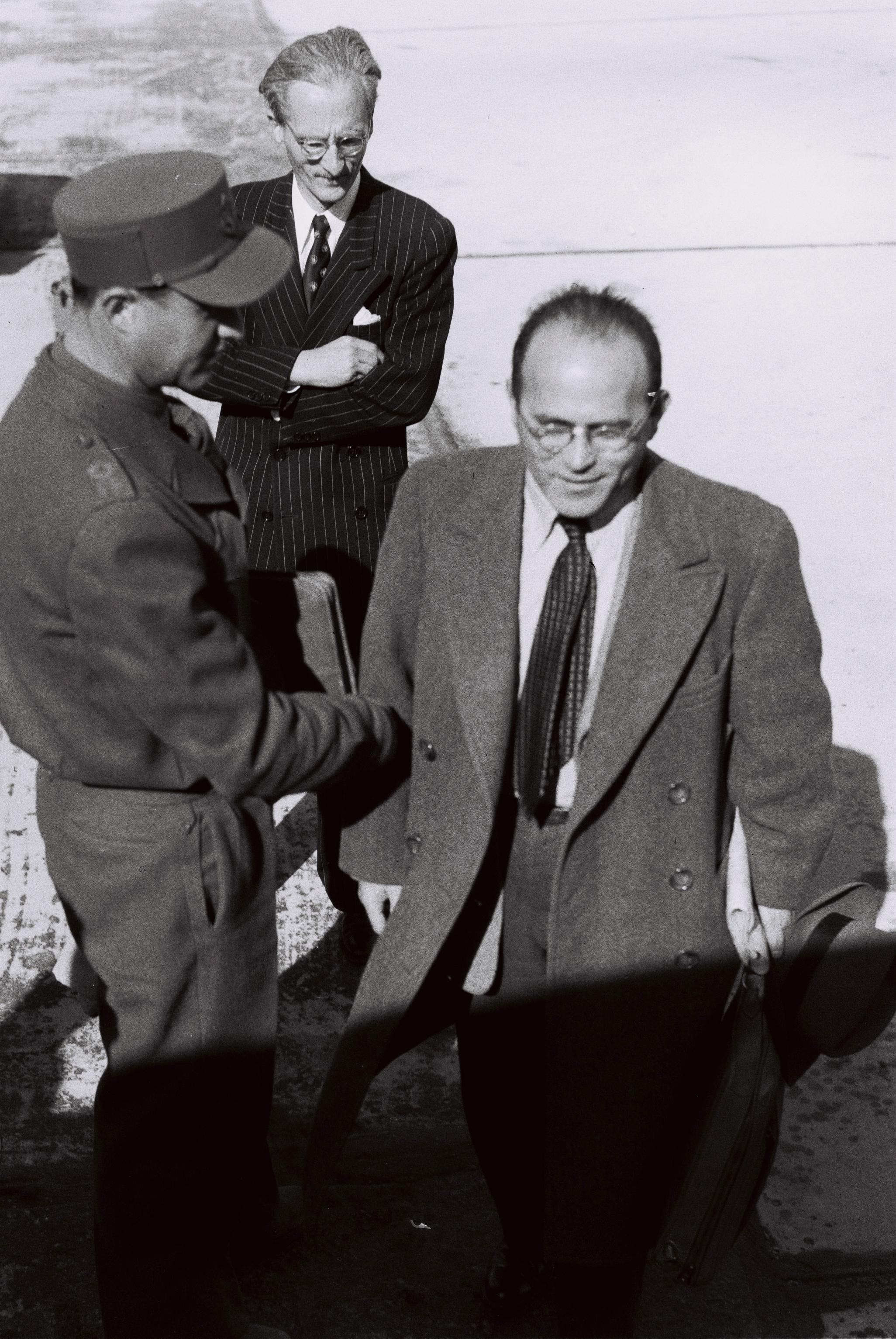
Shiloah on his way to Rhodes for talks on 1949 Armistice Agreements

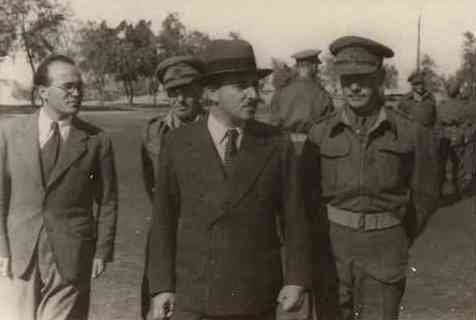
Reuven Shiloah and Moshe Sharett visiting a British artillery unit in Burg el-Arab, Egypt, 1944

Shiloah was born into a religious family in Jerusalem during the late Ottoman Empire. He was the son of Sarah and Rabbi Aharon Yitzhak Zaslansky (a native of Lithuania), one of the rabbis of Jerusalem. He studied at the Tachkemoni School in the city, and later at the David Yellin Teachers College, where he learned Arabic and graduated in 1929. In his youth, he transitioned to secular Zionism and studied Middle Eastern Studies at the Hebrew University of Jerusalem, where he was recruited into the Haganah.

== Intelligence beginnings ==
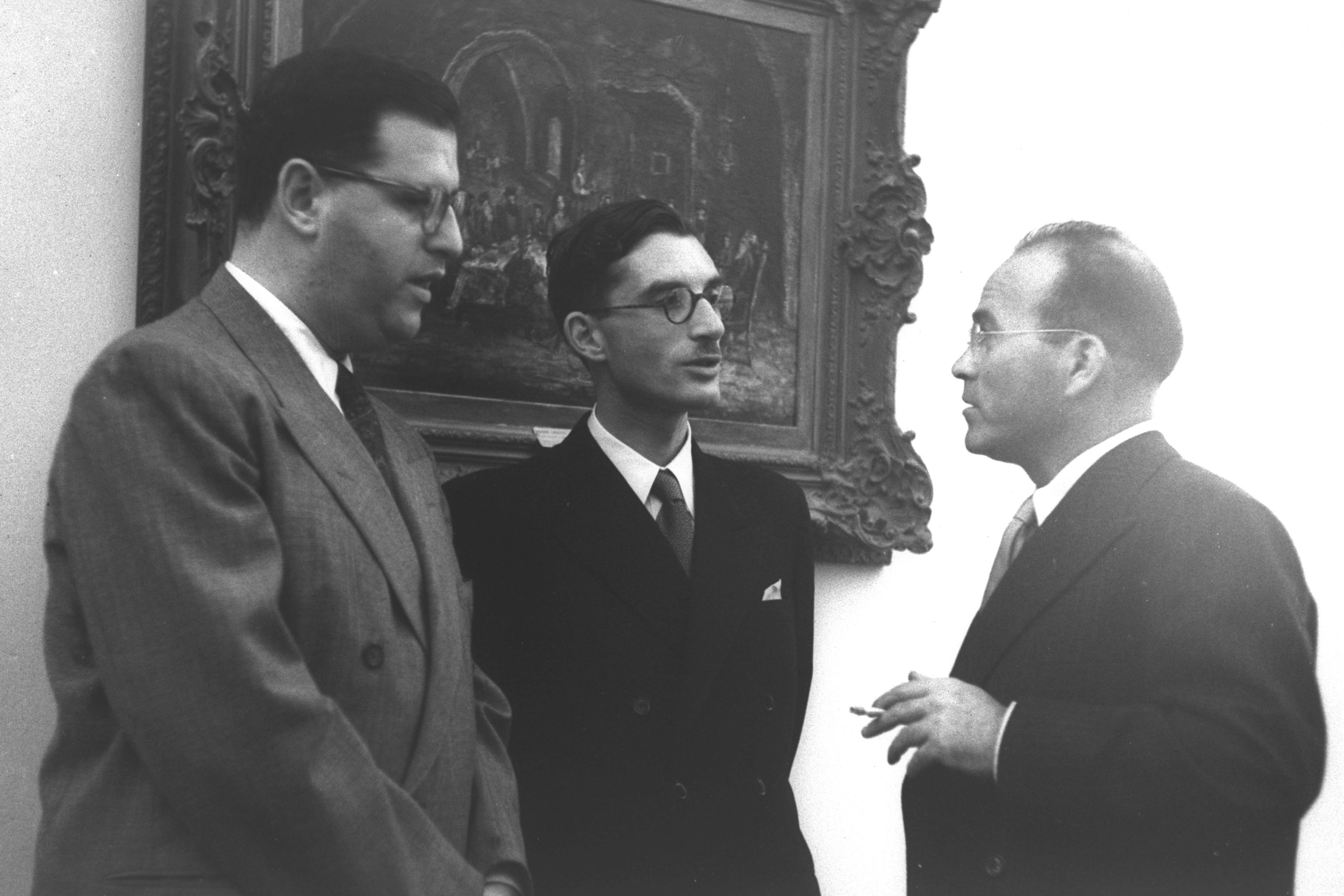
Seen in the office of the President in the Kirya, Tel Aviv: Reuven Shiloah, Shabtai Rosenne, and Abba Eban (July 12, 1949, photo by Hans Chaim Pinn)

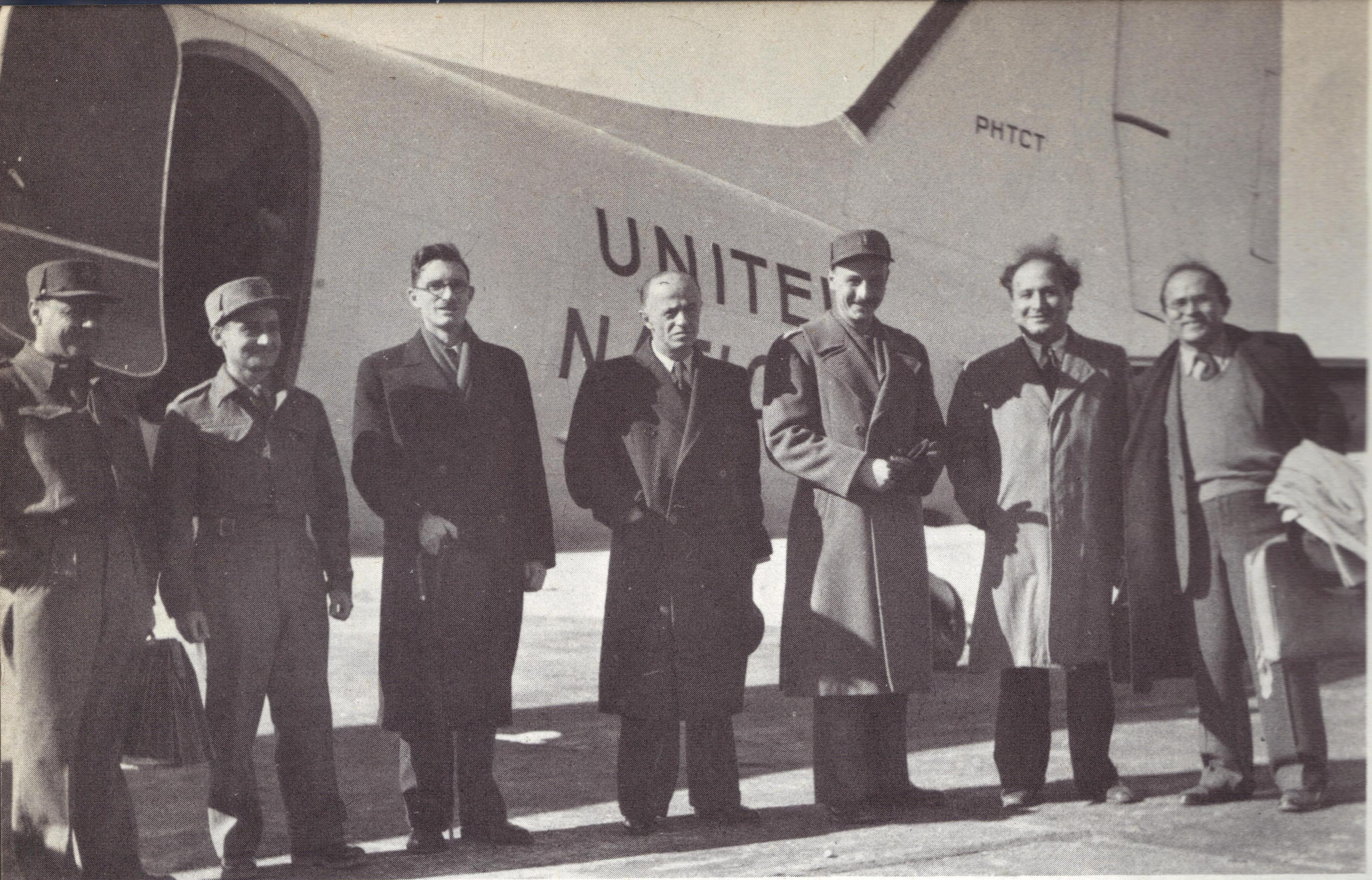
The Israeli delegation on their way to the Rhodes talks. From right to left: Reuven Shiloah, Walter Eytan, Yigal Yadin, Eliyahu Sasson (photo from 1949)

Zaslansky, who had by then shortened his surname to Zaslani, was recruited by Dov Hoz to the Haganah and assigned to intelligence missions on behalf of the Yishuv leadership, receiving the underground alias "Shiloah." His first mission abroad was in 1932 as an envoy of the department to Iraq, where he operated under the cover of a Hebrew teacher and a student of Oriental Studies at the University of Baghdad. During his time there, he reported on the state of the Iraqi Jews and on British and Iraqi evaluations of the situation in the Land of Israel. In 1935, he was sent again to Baghdad, this time under the cover of a journalist for the Palestine Post. During this mission, he developed connections with Kurdish activists. After his return, he operated in the Haganah's military intelligence section among the local Arabs. From 1936 onward, he belonged to the Political Department of the Jewish Agency, undertaking intelligence collection missions in Lebanon and Syria, and was responsible for liaising with British intelligence agencies. In this role, Zaslani helped establish the Special Night Squads and maintained contact with the unit's commander, Orde Charles Wingate. Shiloah recognized the potential in forging ties with the United States and developed relationships with the Office of Strategic Services (OSS), the precursor to the CIA.

In 1941, Shiloah (then still Zaslani) lived next to Tzvi and Rachel Schwartz, the in-laws of Moshe Dayan, and befriended Dayan. He even assisted Dayan during his recovery from the injury in which he lost his eye. Zaslani, who served as head of the Special Affairs Section of the Jewish Agency's Political Department, suggested to Dayan that they establish a spy network to assist the British Army. With its approval and support, the network operated for about a year, until the defeat of Erwin Rommel's forces at the Second Battle of El Alamein.

He was a member of the Jewish Agency delegation to the San Francisco Conference in 1945, which lobbied for the inclusion of Article 80, Chapter 12 in the United Nations Charter.

Immediately after the establishment of the state, David Ben-Gurion, the first Prime Minister, considered the creation of official state intelligence bodies to replace the clandestine organizations that had operated during the Yishuv period. The decision made in 1949 according to Ben-Gurion's diary reads:

We must establish a military intelligence service under the General Staff [the General Staff of the IDF] led by Isser Be'eri and Vivian (Chaim Herzog). The military intelligence will be responsible for security (caution), censorship, and counter-espionage; an internal intelligence service under Isser (the Small) [Isser Halperin, later Isser Harel] and Yosef Y. (Yosef Yizraeli); an external political intelligence service – Reuven Shiloah will head it. It will be subordinate to the Ministry of Defense until the war ends; afterward, perhaps to the Ministry of Foreign Affairs.

— According to Ben-Gurion's diary

Following Ben-Gurion's decision, Reuven Shiloah was appointed head of the Political Department in the Ministry of Foreign Affairs, tasked with completing the role of the "external political intelligence service." He also served as a "Special Advisor to the Foreign Minister."

In 1949, he was part of the Israeli delegation to the armistice talks with Egypt in Rhodes and headed the Israeli delegation to the armistice talks with Jordan. During this time, he provided cover for the IDF's operation to capture southern Negev (Operation Uvda) and played a key role in negotiations with UN mediator Ralph Bunche, who led the talks in Rhodes.

== Founding of Mossad ==
In July 1949, Shiloah proposed to Ben-Gurion the creation of a "central institute for coordinating intelligence and security services" to improve intelligence coordination. On December 13, 1949, this body was established and named the "Coordination Bureau." It oversaw the Political Department and was supposed to coordinate the activities of the other two bodies – Shabak and AMAN (the IDF's intelligence branch). The new organization was still under the Foreign Ministry. In March 1951, the final organizational step in its creation took place. With Ben-Gurion's approval, an independent central authority was established to handle all foreign intelligence activities. This authority, known as "The Authority," formed the main part of what became Mossad and included representatives from the other two services at both the headquarters and field levels. Mossad was now detached from the Foreign Ministry and placed under the Prime Minister's office. In the following period, the "Coordination Bureau" under Shiloah's leadership took on more and more responsibilities and roles, and on April 1, 1951, the Political Department's operations were transferred to a new body, "Mossad." At this time, Shiloah also served as the Director of Intelligence Services.

== Retirement from Mossad and further work ==
In September 1952, Shiloah was severely injured in a car accident. After his recovery, he returned to head Mossad. During his absence, Isser Harel, the head of Shin Bet, intensified his efforts to undermine Shiloah to replace him. At the end of that year, despite Ben-Gurion's support, Shiloah decided to step down from Mossad.

For a few months, he remained the chairman of the Committee of Heads of Services, but he also resigned from this position when he was appointed in 1953 as a diplomatic envoy to the Israeli Embassy in the United States, a role he fulfilled until 1957. After retiring from Mossad and during his time in the United States, he served as a secret advisor to Prime Minister David Ben-Gurion. After completing his post in the United States, he was appointed as a special advisor to Foreign Minister Golda Meir. During this period, his two main focuses were developing relations with peripheral nations and attempting, alongside Deputy Defense Minister Shimon Peres, to secure Israel's entry into NATO. In January 1959, he was granted the personal rank of Ambassador.

He died in 1959 from a heart attack at the age of 49. He was buried at the Sanhedria Cemetery. His brother, Dr. Aryeh Zaslani, a Jerusalem-based psychiatrist, was buried next to him.

== Personal life ==
From 1936, he was married to Betty (née Borden) and had two children.

In memory of Reuven Shiloah, the Shiloah Institute for Middle Eastern and African Studies was established in the Ministry of Defense. After a few years, the institute was transferred to Tel Aviv University. In 1983, the institute was incorporated into the Moshe Dayan Center for Middle Eastern and African Studies.
