= United Nations Security Council Resolution 138 =

United Nations Security Council resolution

UN Security Council Resolution 138
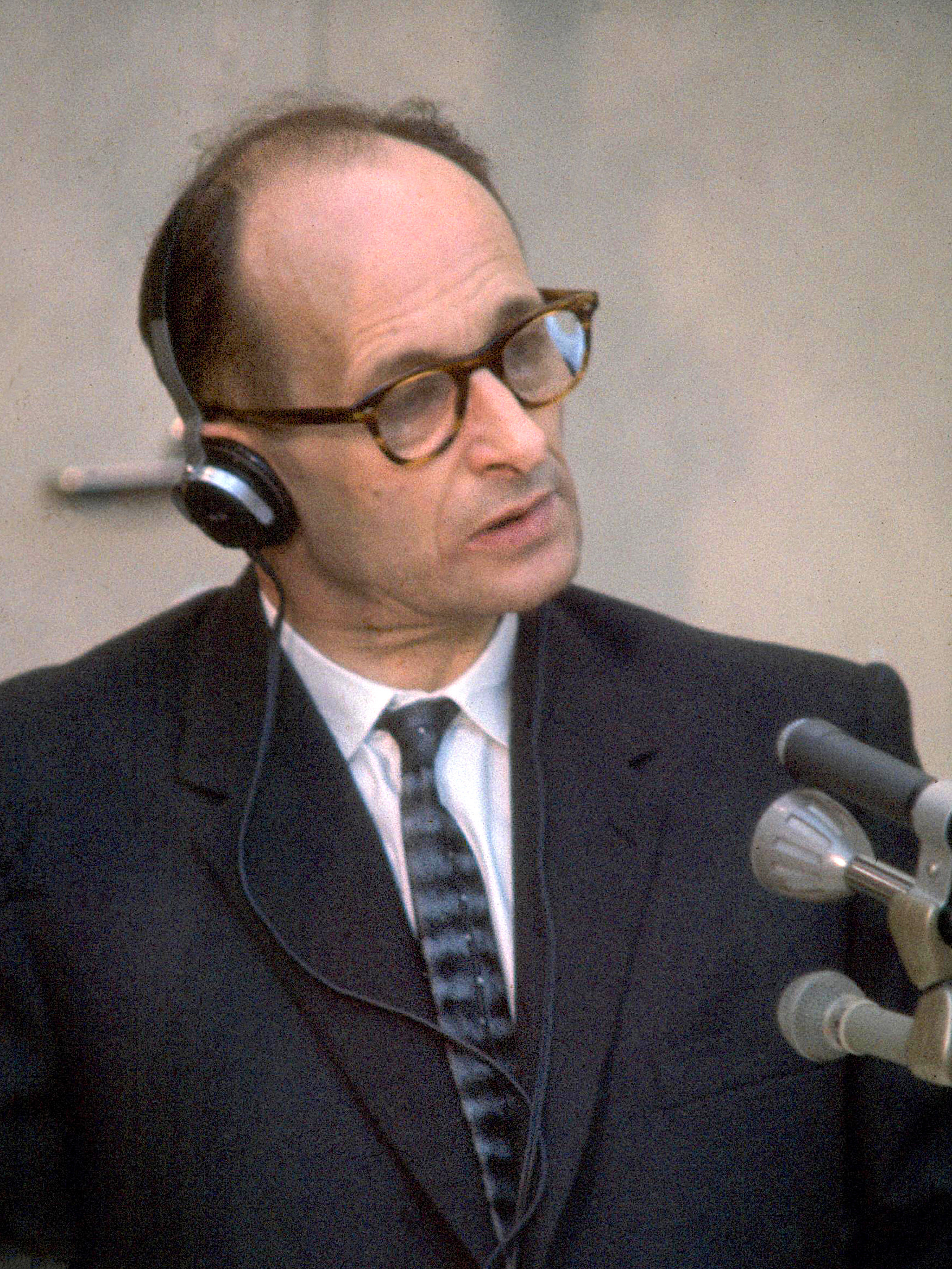
- Eichmann in 1961
- Date: June 23 1960
- Meeting no.: 868
- Code: S/4349 (Document)
- Subject: Question relating to the case of Adolf Eichmann
- Voting summary: 8 voted for; None voted against; 2 abstained; 1 present not voting
- Result: Adopted

Security Council composition
- Permanent members: China; France; Soviet Union; United Kingdom; United States
- Non-permanent members: Argentina; Ceylon; Ecuador; Italy; Poland; Tunisia

United Nations Security Council Resolution 138 was adopted on June 23, 1960, after a complaint that the transfer of Adolf Eichmann to Israel from Argentina constituted a violation of the latter's sovereignty. The Council declared that such acts, if repeated, could endanger international peace and security and requested that Israel make the appropriate reparation in accordance with the Charter of the United Nations and the rules of international law.

Argentina itself, repeatedly challenged to interpret its demand for “appropriate reparation,” declined to take up the challenge. Dr. Mario Amadeo, Argentina’s delegation chairman, was asked sharply for a “yes or no” answer by Soviet delegation chairman Arkady A. Sobolev in regard to the demand he voiced in the Council the previous day for Eichmann’s return and punishment of those guilty of abducting the Nazi from Argentina. Dr. Amadeo refused flatly to give such an answer, declaring that each delegation is entitled to make its own interpretation of what “appropriate reparation” might mean.

During the debate, Israel told the Security Council that Eichmann had been captured by private individuals acting on their own behalf, that Eichmann had volunteered to come to Israel, and that the Israeli government only heard about it later without learning that he had come from Argentina.

Israel held the view that the matter was beyond the Council's competence and should instead be settled via direct bilateral negotiations. Israel and Argentina did conduct further negotiations, and on August 3 issued a joint declaration admitting that Argentine sovereignty had been violated, but that the dispute had been resolved.

Resolution 138 was approved by eight votes to none; the People's Republic of Poland and the Soviet Union abstained. Argentina was present but did not participate in voting, making this resolution one of the last recorded instances of a state abstaining from voting under the nemo iudex in causa sua principle of Article 27(3) of the UN Charter.

== See also ==
- List of United Nations Security Council Resolutions 101 to 200 (1953–1965)
