= Yonah Elian =

Israeli anesthesiologist and Holocaust survivor

- יונה אליאן
- Born: 1923; Bucharest, Kingdom of Romania
- Died: 2011 (aged 87–88); Israel
- Occupation: Anesthesiologist
- Known for: Sedating Adolf Eichmann during Eichmann's repatriation

Yonah Elian (Hebrew: יונה אליאן, born Yonah Elias) was a Romanian-born Israeli anesthesiologist and a Holocaust survivor, best known for sedating Adolf Eichmann during the Mossad operation to capture Eichmann.

He was the nephew of Romanian industrialist and philanthropist Jacques Menachem Elias.

In 1954, the Mossad captured Alexander Israel, an Israeli officer accused of espionage. Elian, a civilian anesthesiologist, was recruited to sedate Israel for a flight out of Rome; however, the drugs inadvertently killed Israel. A government inquiry cleared Elian of wrongdoing. The botched operation remained a secret until 2006.

Elian also assisted in the 1960 operation to capture and repatriate Adolf Eichmann from Argentina. His role was to sedate Eichmann, as well as to treat any team injuries if necessary. The needle he used to successfully sedate Eichmann so that Eichmann could be anonymously transported through the airport, was later displayed at the Beit Hatfutsot Museum, but was subsequently withdrawn from display. During his lifetime, Elian consistently declined requests to speak publicly about his role.

== In film ==
In Operation Finale (2018), Yonah Elian's role is subsumed into a fictional character, "Hanna Elian", played by Mélanie Laurent.
