= Yossele Schumacher affair =

Child abduction case in Israel

Yossele Schumacher
- יוסל'ה שוחמכר
- Born: 1952 (age 73–74); Soviet Union
- Known for: Victim of child abduction
- Parents: Alter Schumacher (father); Ida Schumacher (mother)

Yossele Schumacher (Hebrew: יוסל'ה שוחמכר, Yiddish: יאָסעלע שוכמאַכער; born 1952) is a Soviet-born Israeli whose abduction as a child in 1960 became a cause célèbre within Israeli Jewish society. Schumacher was abducted by his Haredi Orthodox Jewish grandparents to prevent him from being raised as a secular Jew by his parents, and was found in the United States after an extensive international search by Mossad before being returned to his parents' custody. Schumacher's abduction led to an early major polarization among Israeli Jews due to disagreements between Haredi Jews, who largely supported the abduction, and Secular Jews, who largely opposed it.

== Background ==
Yossele Schumacher was born in 1952 in the Soviet Union to secular Jewish parents Alter and Ida Schumacher. His maternal grandparents, Nachman and Miriam Shtarkes, were Haredi Jews of the Breslov Hasidic sect. In 1958, the family immigrated to Israel, where Schumacher's parents settled on a secular kibbutz. However, they encountered financial difficulties and subsequently asked the boy's maternal grandparents to look after him. The Shtarkes agreed to look after Schumacher; after settling in Jerusalem and joining the local Breslov community, they sent him to a religious boarding school. A few months later, the financial situation of Schumacher's parents improved, and they asked for his return to their custody, but the Shtarkes, determined to raise the child as a Hasidic Jew, refused due to the Schumachers' objection to bringing him up religiously. The Shtarkes also accused the Schumachers of planning on returning to the Soviet Union to raise the boy as a Communist, an accusation that was later often echoed by Haredi Jews. The grandparents decided to hide the boy within the Haredi community in Israel, and Nachman Shtarkes, together with his son Shalom, arranged for Yossele to be hidden from his parents.

== Abduction ==
Yossele Schumacher was hidden in various Haredi enclaves in Jerusalem, Bnei Brak, Safed, Rishon LeZion, and Komemiyut. Israeli police launched a search operation for him, and the Israeli Supreme Court ordered the Shtrakes to return him to his parents by 15 February 1960. The grandparents refused, insisting that the parents were planning on returning to the Soviet Union, and Nachman Shtarkes was subsequently imprisoned but still refused to divulge any information.

The Haredi couple in Bnei Brak that had briefly hidden him were also imprisoned. With police still searching for Schumacher, it was decided within the Haredi community that he needed to be taken out of Israel, and they now needed to find someone who could smuggle a small child out of the country. Rabbi Abraham Eliyahu Maizes of the anti-Zionist Yeshiva (Jewish Religious College) Torah Vyirah asked one of his disciples, Ruth Blau, also known as Ruth Ben David, to do it. Blau, originally Madeleine Feraille, was a French convert to Judaism, managed an import-export firm, and attended graduate school in France and Switzerland before converting to Judaism in 1950. Although initially Zionist, she later adopted Haredi anti-Zionist views and in 1965 married Amram Blau, founder of Neturei Karta. Her son Uriel assisted her, and Yossele himself, who had been convinced that his parents did not want to bring him up as a proper Jew, cooperated. On June 21, 1960, Schumacher was taken out of Israel by Blau, who had disguised him as a girl, forged a passport for him, and then taken him on a flight to Europe. Schumacher would spend two years total in Europe under her care, living in Switzerland, France, and Belgium. Initially, Blau took him to Switzerland, where she enrolled him in a yeshiva. Meanwhile, authorities in Israel had increased their search efforts.

=== Investigation ===
The Haredi community criticized the Israeli government and police's desire to return Schumacher to his parents, believing it was part of a government plot to secularize as many Orthodox Jewish children as possible. The Israeli government, on the other hand, saw the refusal to return Schumacher as a direct challenge by a religious subculture to its authority. Shin Bet, the Israeli internal security service, along with Israel Defense Forces soldiers and police, searched for Schumacher in religious neighborhoods, villages, and kibbutzim.

Prime Minister David Ben-Gurion finally asked the Mossad to investigate. Mossad Director-General Isser Harel assembled a team of forty agents, but due to their unfamiliarity with the traditions and nuances of Haredi life, they were swiftly unmasked in their attempts to infiltrate the Haredi world. As the search for Schumacher proved fruitless, Harel became convinced that the child had been smuggled abroad and was probably somewhere in Europe. Subsequently, the Mossad began searching for Schumacher internationally, and Harel moved his operations headquarters to a Mossad safe-house in Paris, and sent agents to infiltrate Haredi communities throughout France, Italy, Austria, and the United Kingdom, then expanded the search to South America and the United States, but their efforts to infiltrate these communities proved difficult. During their investigation, Mossad agents abducted Rabbi Shai Freyer, a teacher at the yeshiva Schumacher was studying in, as he traveled between Paris and Geneva. He refused to divulge anything during intense questioning, convincing the agents this was another dead end, but Harel ordered him held prisoner in a Mossad safe house in Switzerland (where he was beaten and tortured to try to divulge information but he wouldn't budge), until the end of the investigation to prevent him from alerting the Haredi community.

After getting word that Mossad was searching for Schumacher in Switzerland, Blau took him first to Brussels and then to Paris, presenting the child as her daughter each time she traveled. When the Mossad focused its search on the Haredi community of Paris, she smuggled Schumacher to the United States in March 1962 on a flight to New York City, where he was hidden in the apartment of a Haredi woman, Mrs. Gertner, at 126 Penn Street, Williamsburg, Brooklyn in New York City. The family gave Schumacher the name Yankele Frenkel and kept him indoors, holding him from the time he arrived in March until August 1962. The Mossad had anticipated the possibility of Schumacher being smuggled to the United States, and asked the FBI for assistance. In 1961, FBI agents searched Ultra-Orthodox summer camps in the Catskill Mountains for Schumacher.

As they combed potential suspects in the Haredi world, Mossad investigators found a potential lead in Ruth Blau. Checks showed that she was a regular visitor to Israel, where she spent time with members of Neturei Karta, had met Yossele's grandfather on several occasions, and that her last visit to Israel was around the same time of the abduction. Focusing their investigation on her, the agents traced Blau, who was still in France, to the outskirts of Paris. At this time, Blau had decided to sell her house, and in August 1962 met a potential real estate agent named "Mr. Faber" in an attorney's office. The real estate agent was in fact Harel, accompanied by a team of Mossad agents who had interrogated Adolf Eichmann. Though uncooperative at first, Blau admitted her complicity when confronted with evidence that she had smuggled Schumacher out of Israel disguised as her daughter. She refused to divulge his whereabouts until Harel told her that her son Uriel, who was serving in the Israeli military, had divulged her involvement. Feeling betrayed and realizing that the kidnapping was a failure, Blau told them where Schumacher was. Mossad officer Aliza Magen-Halevi reportedly convinced Blau to reveal Schumacher's location. After the Mossad informed US Attorney General Robert F. Kennedy that Schumacher was living with a Hasidic family in Brooklyn, he instructed the FBI to fully cooperate with Mossad. In September 1962, a team of FBI agents and Mossad operatives took Schumacher into custody and put him on a flight to Israel, where he was reunited with his parents.

== Controversy ==
The abduction of Yossele Schumacher caused enormous controversy among Jewish society within Israel, driving a divide between many Haredi Jews — who supported the grandparents and claimed that the government was only working on this case as a direct fight with the Haredim, and therefore the matter was much more controversial and hot topic at the time. Many Secular Jews yelled Epho Yossele? ("Where is Yossele?" in Hebrew) in Jerusalem, turning to the more Haredi neighbourhoods and terrorizing the Jews living there, as the phrase had previously been used by Haredi Jews that supported Schumacher's grandparents to taunt police searching for Schumacher both in Israel and internationally.

The search itself was also an object of controversy, as Harel was criticized for his focus on this case at the expense of manhunts for Nazi officials, notably by then Aman director Major General Meir Amit and even from the Israeli spy Peter Malkin.

== Later developments ==
Yossele Schumacher returned to his family, which at the time was living in Holon. At first, he attended a religious school but was later sent to a secular school. In 1969, he was chairman of the Holon Youth Parliament. He was conscripted into the Israel Defense Forces in 1970, and served as an officer in the Artillery Corps. He then worked at IBM for several years. In August 1979, he married Ita Horowitz in a wedding that drew media attention. Schumacher has three children, and lives in the Israeli settlement of Sha'arei Tikva and serves as a member of the settlement committee. In 2007, he visited New York and met Mrs. Gertner, in whose home he had been hidden.

In 2020, Schumacher said that he had made peace with what he endured, and that he had forgiven all those who took part in his kidnapping except for Ruth Blau.

== See also ==
- List of kidnappings
- List of solved missing person cases (1950–1969)
