= Harry Stein (author) =

American writer (born 1948)

- Born: Harry J. Stein; November 25, 1948 (age 77)
- Education: New Rochelle High School; Pomona College; Columbia University Graduate School of Journalism
- Occupations: Writer, journalist
- Father: Joseph Stein

Harry J. Stein (born November 25, 1948) is an American author and columnist. As of 2020, he is a contributing editor to the political magazine City Journal.

== Biography ==
External videos
- Booknotes interview with Stein on How I Accidentally Joined the Vast Right-Wing Conspiracy, August 20, 2000, C-SPAN

Stein graduated from New Rochelle High School in 1966 and Pomona College in May 1970. He later graduated from the Columbia University Graduate School of Journalism.

Stein wrote for Ramparts and New Times magazines in the 1970s, and originated Esquire's "Ethics" column in the 1980s. During the 1990s he wrote a column on television ethics for TV Guide. As part of the New York media scene of the early 1980s he was a member of the inaugural Rotisserie League formed by Daniel Okrent.

He is the author of novels and memoirs, including satirical political commentary related to his transition from liberal to conservative viewpoints. His first book, Tiny Tim, a biography of the entertainer, was published in 1976.

Stein's father, the late Joseph Stein, was a Broadway librettist/playwright, best known for Fiddler on the Roof.

== Bibliography ==
=== Novels ===
- Hoopla. Alfred A. Knopf. 1983. ISBN 0394504895.
- The Magic Bullet. Delacorte Press. 1995. ISBN 0385312865.
- Infinity's Child. Bruna. 1996. ISBN 9044927477.
- Will Tripp Pissed Off Attorney-at-Law. CreateSpace. 2013. ISBN 978-1492737629.

=== Non-fiction ===
Autobiographies

- One Of The Guys: The Wising Up Of An American Man. Simon & Schuster. 1988. ISBN 0671557041.
- How I Accidentally Joined the Vast Right-Wing Conspiracy. Delacorte Press. 2000. ISBN 038533396X. (memoirs)

Biographies

- Tiny Tim. Playboy. 1976. ISBN 087223455X. (with Tiny Tim)
- Eichmann in My Hands: A Compelling First-Person Account by the Israeli Agent Who Captured Hitler's Chief Executioner. Warner Books. 1990. ISBN 0446514187. (with Peter Malkin) (or Eichmann in My Hands: A First-Person Account by the Israeli Agent Who Captured Hitler's Chief Executioner)
- The Girl Watchers Club: Lessons from the Battlefields of Life. HarperCollins. 2004. ISBN 0066211727.

Politics

- I Can't Believe I'm Sitting Next to a Republican: A Survival Guide for Conservatives Marooned Among the Angry, Smug, and Terminally Self-Righteous. Encounter Books. 2009. ISBN 978-1594032530.
- No Matter What...They'll Call This Book Racist: How our Fear of Talking Honestly About Race Hurts Us All. Encounter Books. 2012. ISBN 978-1594036002.
- The Idiot Vote: The Democrats' Core Constituency. Smashwords Edition. 2012. ISBN 9781301052912.

True events

- Blowing at the Blowhole. 1992.
- From The Barn On The Hill To Edwards & Shaw: 1939 1983: The Story Of Two Young Men Who Built A Master Printery And Publishing House That Became A Major Influence On Printing And Book Design In Australia. University of New South Wales Press. 1996. ISBN 0730589285.
- Rooted in the Past, Growing for the Future: Pope Resources. Sasquatch Books. 2003. ISBN 1570613885.
- Pope & Talbot. Documentary Book. 2005. ISBN 1570613869.

Others

- Southern Africa: Angola, Botswana, Lesotho, Malawi, Mozambique, Namibia, Republic of South Africa, Rhodesia, Swaziland, Zambia. Franklin Watts. 1975. ISBN 0531008231. (history)
- Ethics (and Other Liabilities): Trying to Live Right in an Amoral World. St. Martin's Griffin. 1983. ISBN 0312265573. (philosophy)
- How to Interpret Visual Resources. Franklin Watts. 1983. ISBN 0531046702. (guide)
- Why We Won't Talk Honestly about Race. Encounter Books. 2013. ISBN 978-1306436298. (opinion)
