= Zvi Aharoni =

Israeli Mossad agent (1921–2012)

- צבי אהרוני
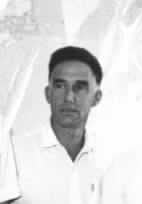
- Born: Hermann Arndt; 6 February 1921; Frankfurt (Oder), Germany
- Died: 26 May 2012 (aged 91); England, United Kingdom
- Known for: Capture of Adolf Eichmann

Zvi Aharoni (Hebrew: צבי אהרוני; 6 February 1921 – 26 May 2012) was an Israeli Shin Bet agent instrumental in the capture of Adolf Eichmann. He was portrayed by Michael Aronov in Operation Finale, a 2018 film about Eichmann's capture.

== Biography ==
Hermann Aronheim (later Zvi Aharoni) was born in Frankfurt an der Oder, Germany. He immigrated to Mandatory Palestine in 1938 with his mother and younger brother Michael. His older brother Yohanan had immigrated to Palestine in 1933.

Aharoni enlisted in the British Army during World War II and was trained as a POW interrogator. He served in North Africa and Italy. In 1946 he was discharged from the British Army. He then joined the Haganah and fought in the Israel Defense Forces during the 1948 Arab-Israeli War, serving as an officer in the Carmeli Brigade.

Aharoni subsequently joined Shin Bet and spent 20 years working for Shin Bet and the Mossad. He was the agent who identified "Ricardo Klement" as Eichmann. Aharoni flew to Buenos Aires and tracked down the family's house in a remote neighborhood on the outskirts of town. On 19 March 1960 he spotted Eichmann. In his account of the capture, Aharoni wrote: "I saw him about two o'clock in the afternoon ... a man of medium size and build, about fifty years old, with a high forehead and partially bald, collecting the washing." His assistant photographed Eichmann using a camera hidden in a bag.

After retiring from intelligence work in 1970, Aharoni moved to Hong Kong, where he married a British woman named Valerie after his first wife died in 1973. After five years in Hong Kong, he returned to Israel and established a polygraph institute before selling it in 1980 and moving to China to work with Shaul Eisenberg for another five years. In 1985, he retired and shortly after that moved to England along with his wife Valerie. At his death in 2012, aged 91, he was survived by Valerie and by a son and daughter from his previous marriage.

== Published works ==
- Aharoni, Zvi (1997). Operation Eichmann: The Truth about the Pursuit, Capture, and Trial. Wiley-Blackwell. ASIN B0015GWWPO.
