= Operation Damocles =

1962–63 Israeli covert operation in Egypt

Operation Damocles was a covert campaign of the Israeli intelligence agency, Mossad in August 1962 which targeted German scientists and technicians, formerly employed in Nazi Germany's rocket program, who were developing rockets for Egypt at a military site known as Factory 333. According to Otto Joklik, an Austrian scientist involved with the project, the rockets being developed were programmed to use radioactive waste.

The chief tactics were letter bombs and abduction. In March 1963, Israeli Prime Minister David Ben-Gurion demanded the resignation of then chief of Mossad, Isser Harel, over the operation, which effectively ended it. The operation and diplomatic pressure had driven the scientists out of Egypt by the end of 1963.

== Egypt's rocket program ==
The Egyptian President Gamal Abdel Nasser did not want to rely upon the West or the Soviet Union for rockets, since such an arrangement would be inconsistent with Egypt's policy of Cold War non-alignment. An indigenous rocket program was thus the only way Egypt could match the military technology of Egypt's then enemy, Israel. At the time, rocket technology was scarce in the Middle East, so Egypt had to look to European countries for material and expertise. Hassan Sayed Kamil, an Egyptian-Swiss arms dealer, provided Egypt with material and recruits from West Germany and Switzerland, despite both countries having official laws prohibiting the provision of weapons to Middle Eastern countries. Many of the West German scientists had previously been involved in Nazi Germany's rocket program during World War II, working at Peenemünde to develop the V-2 rocket, and some had worked for France's rocket program in the aftermath of the war.

Egypt's rocket program came to the world's attention when it successfully test-fired a rocket in July 1962 and then paraded two new types of rocket through the streets of Cairo, causing worldwide interest and shock. The flow of rocket expertise from West Germany to Egypt damaged the relations between Israel and West Germany, but did not stop the payment of reparations and the covert supply of arms to Israel by West Germany. Israel became increasingly concerned with the program after a disaffected Austrian scientist involved with it approached the Israeli secret service, and claimed the Egyptians were attempting to equip the missile with radioactive waste as well as procuring nuclear warheads. In mid-August, Mossad managed to obtain a document written by German scientist Wolfgang Pilz, detailing certain aspects of Factory 333 – the number of rockets being built (900), and additional, weaker evidence that there were plans to develop chemical, biological and gas-filled warheads for these rockets. To gain the support of the Israeli population, the head of Mossad planted stories about sinister weapons being developed by the German scientists in Egypt.

== Israeli reaction ==
Israeli Prime Minister David Ben-Gurion was told by German officials that the amount of German involvement was being overblown. Because of this, as well as the German-Israel relationship which was showing improvement after much cultivation, he was against taking action. Members of the Israeli political right, such as Menachem Begin, accused Ben-Gurion of being soft on the Germans. He demanded a halt to the sale of Israeli Uzi submachine guns to Germany, and an end to diplomatic relations with Germany. The Mossad agreed with the hard stance against Germany and decided to independently take action against the scientists.

== Attacks on German scientists ==
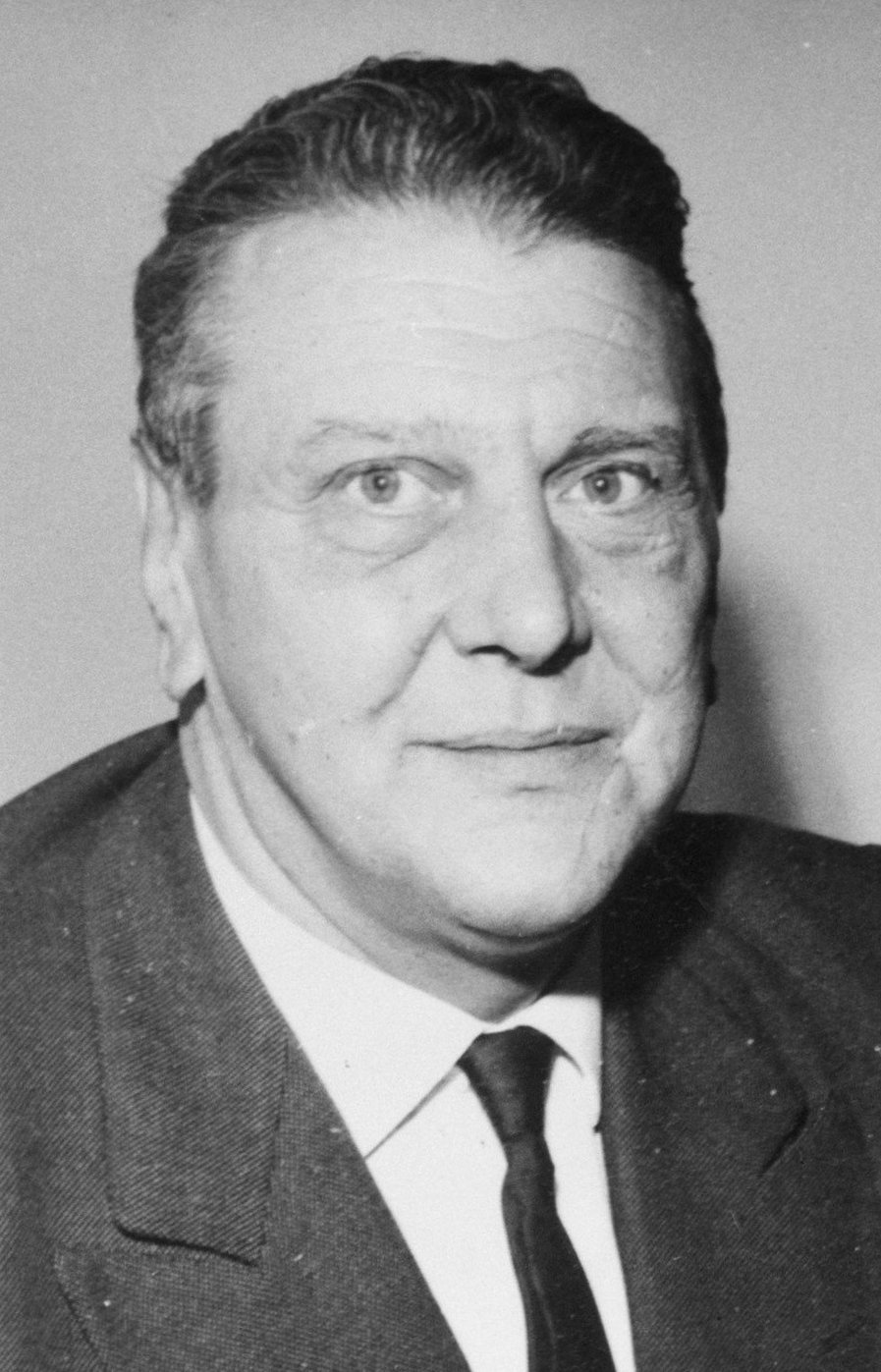
Former SS-Standartenführer Otto Skorzeny (shown in 1963) was supposedly hired for Operation Damocles

The main tactics employed by Israel against the scientists were letter bombs and abductions. Their families were threatened with violence to persuade the scientists to return to Europe. Mossad provided a small operational unit, headed by future Israeli Prime Minister Yitzhak Shamir, but since it lacked an operational division at that time it mainly used units from the Shin Bet to carry out the attacks.

- A parcel sent to rocket scientist Wolfgang Pilz exploded in his office in Cairo when opened on 27 November 1962, injuring his secretary.
- A parcel sent to the Heliopolis rocket factory killed five Egyptian workers.
- A pistol was fired at a West German professor in the town of Lörrach who was researching electronics for Egypt. The bullet missed and the gunman escaped by car.
- Heinz Krug, 49, the chief of a Munich company supplying military hardware to Egypt disappeared in September 1962 and is believed to have been murdered. Krug was director of an Egyptian dummy company operating out of Munich that was involved in building missiles in Egypt. According to Dan Raviv and Yossi Melman, Krug was killed near Munich by former Nazi commando Otto Skorzeny. According to Ronen Bergman, Krug was kidnapped in Munich by a Mossad squad headed by Mossad chief Isser Harel himself and was killed in Israel after having been subjected to harsh interrogation.
- Hans Kleinwachter, a rocket scientist who worked on the V-2 project was targeted in February 1963, but the assassination attempt failed due to a weapon malfunction.

== Public exposure of the operation ==
Two Mossad agents, Joseph Ben-Gal, an Israeli, and Otto Joklik, Austrian, were arrested in Switzerland for threatening Heidi Goercke, daughter of a West German electronic guidance expert working at Factory 333, Paul-Jens Goercke. They ordered her to persuade Goercke to return to Germany, threatening their safety if he did not comply. They were arrested for coercion and illegal operation on behalf of a foreign state. Swiss investigations revealed that they were also involved in the abduction of Krug and the assassination attempt upon Kleinwachter. The arrests caused a public scandal for Israel. Israel publicly denied the claims, asserting that its agents only used methods of "peaceful persuasion".

== Resignation of Isser Harel ==
Following the capture of Adolf Eichmann, Isser Harel became preoccupied by the Holocaust, which hardened his attitude towards the German scientists. He said when challenged about the operation, "There are people who are marked to die".

The campaign ended when Israeli Prime Minister David Ben-Gurion demanded that Mossad halt the attacks. Then-Foreign Minister Golda Meir and Israeli diplomats trying to build relations between West Germany and Israel were furious about the attacks. Harel was compelled to resign and Meir Amit, his successor as chief of Mossad, claimed that Harel had overestimated the danger to Israel posed by Egypt's weapon programs. Yitzhak Shamir and others resigned from the Mossad in protest at Harel's treatment. David Ben-Gurion quit his post three months later.

The combination of the death threats and diplomatic pressure drove the scientists away from Egypt by the end of 1963. By 1967, Egypt's rocket program had come to a standstill and Egypt turned to the Soviet Union, which supplied it with Scud B rockets.
