= Carlos Fuldner =

Argentine-born Nazi and businessman

Carlos Horst Fuldner (December 16, 1910 – 1992) was an Argentine born Nazi and businessman. He served as a captain in the SS during World War II, at one point as a translator for the Blue Division, and after the war worked with Rodolfo Freude and Karl Nicolussi-Leck to set up ratlines to assist fleeing Nazis get to South America and find employment. Notable individuals he assisted included Adolf Eichmann who was employed by his CAPRI hydroelectric construction firm.
