= Peter Malkin =

Israeli secret agent (1927–2005)

Peter Zvi Malkin
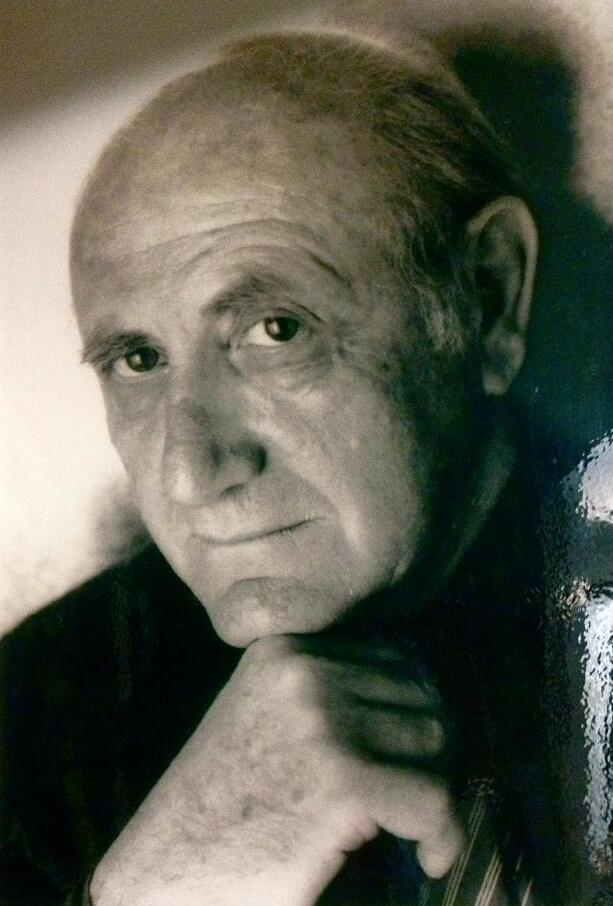
- Native name: פיטר צבי מלחין
- Born: 27 May 1927; Żółkiewka-Osada, Poland
- Died: 1 March 2005 (aged 77) New York City, United States
- Allegiance: Israel
- Branch: Mossad
- Service years: 1948–1976
- Rank: Chief of Operations
- Conflicts: Capture of Adolf Eichmann; Operation against Nazi nuclear rocket scientists; Operation Wrath of God
- Spouse: Roni Thorner
- Children: 3

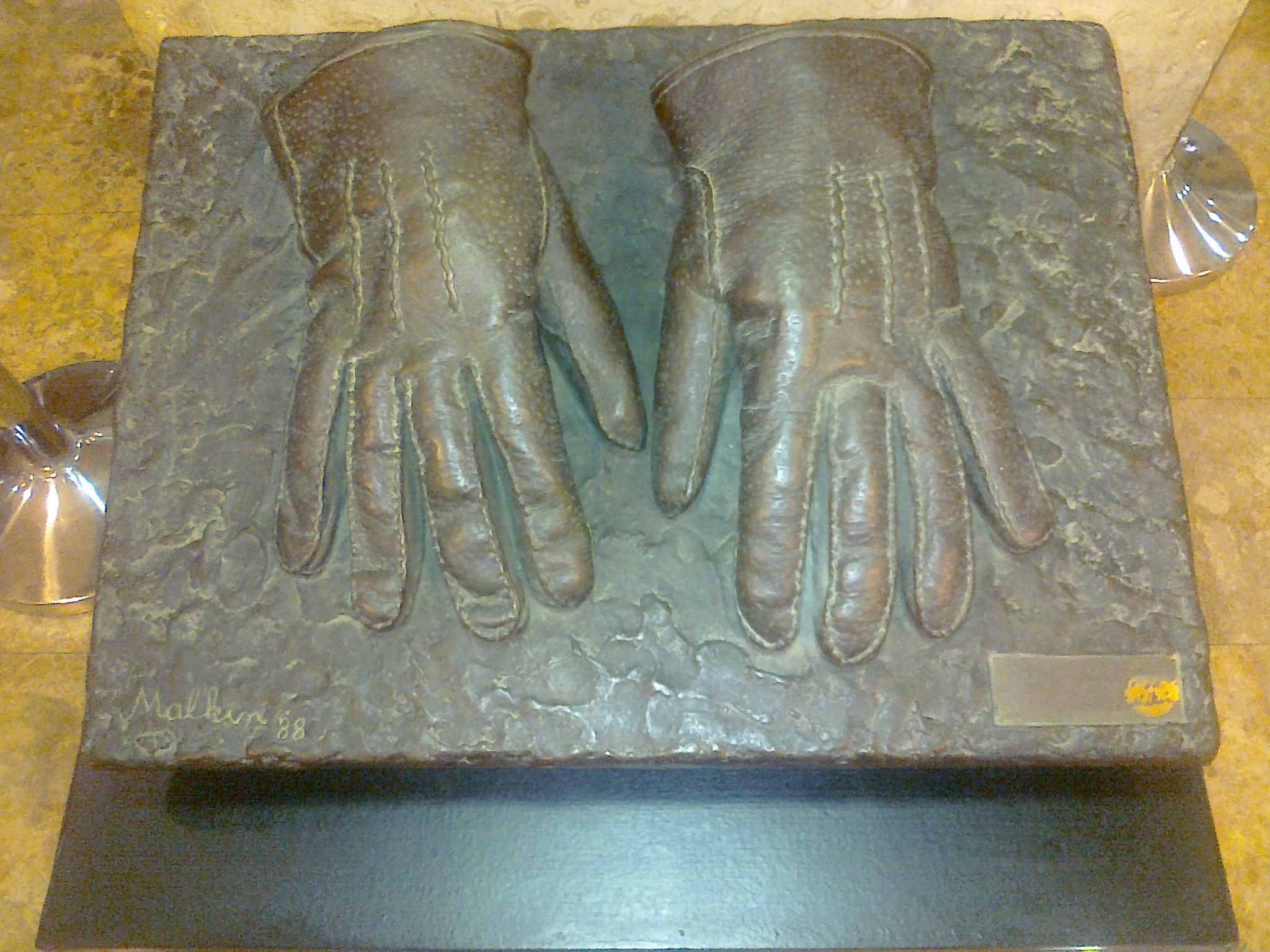
Bronze casting of the gloves worn by Peter Zvi Malkin when he captured Adolf Eichmann.

Peter Zvi Malkin (Hebrew: פיטר צבי מלחין; Polish: Cywka Małchin, May 27, 1927 – March 1, 2005) was a Polish-born Israeli secret agent and member of the Mossad intelligence agency. He was part of the team that captured Adolf Eichmann in Argentina in 1960 and brought him to Israel to stand trial for crimes against humanity.

== Biography ==
Peter Zvi ("Zvika") Malkin was born in Żółkiewka-Osada, Poland, to an observant Jewish family. In 1933, his family fled to Palestine to escape the rising tide of German anti-Semitism; his sister, Fruma, and her three children who remained behind with 150 other relatives, were murdered in the Holocaust. At the age of 12, Malkin was recruited into the Haganah as an explosives expert. He was an expert in martial arts and disguises.

Malkin was married to Roni (nee Thorner), with whom he had two daughters, Tami and Adi, and a son, Omer.

After retiring in 1976, Malkin devoted himself to painting and sculpture, which served as his cover during his Mossad years. The paintings he created from the 1960s until he died won international acclaim in London, Paris, Brussels and Israel. He also authored books, and served as a private international consultant on anti-terrorism methods.

Malkin spent his last years in New York City with his wife and children. He died on March 1, 2005.

== Intelligence career ==
Malkin spent 27 years in the Mossad, first as an agent and later as Chief of Operations. As Chief of Operations he played a major role in the capture of Israel Bar, a Soviet spy who had penetrated the highest levels of Israeli government. He also led an operation against Nazi nuclear rocket scientists who assisted an Egyptian weapons development program after World War II.

Malkin established a unit known as Keshet whose expertise was infiltrating airline offices, travel agencies, airports, seaports and foreign embassies. On several occasions, he carried out wiretapping and other missions with Israeli actor Chaim Topol whose international fame diverted attention from Malkin.

Malkin's most famous mission was on May 11, 1960, when he and a team of Mossad agents led by Rafi Eitan captured Adolf Eichmann, then living and hiding in Argentina. A senior Nazi bureaucrat, Eichmann had played a key role in organizing the extermination of Jews during World War II. "Momentito, señor" (One moment, sir) were the words he uttered in Spanish as he approached Eichmann. Eichmann began to fear for his life and turned to flee, but several of Malkin's fellow agents blocked Eichmann's path. Then Malkin grabbed him in a neck-lock, wrestled him to the ground, and bundled him in the car that took them to a safe house outside Buenos Aires. Malkin says he wore gloves so as not to touch the man.

Malkin took part in the Mossad's assassinations after a terrorist attack targeting Israeli Olympic athletes in Munich in September 1972. He headed a group of agents from the Mossad's burglary unit who planted a bomb under a telephone at the home of Mahmoud Hamshari, who was the representative of the Palestine Liberation Organization to France.

In the mid 1980s, Malkin was recruited to go after former SS doctor Josef Mengele. Malkin and the team of ex-Mossad agents that he put together did not know at the time that Mengele was already dead. At the last minute, Malkin and the team called off the operation when they realized that it was a trap.

In 1989, Israeli newspaper Maariv cited him as "one of the greatest figures ever in the history of the Mossad." Israeli journalist Uri Dan called him "an extraordinary secret warrior."

Malkin is said to have been involved in the search for Yossele Schumacher in the 1960s.

== Cultural references ==
The movie, The Man Who Captured Eichmann (1996) starring Robert Duvall as Adolf Eichmann, was based on his book Eichmann in My Hands. Arliss Howard played Malkin. Evan M. Wiener's play Captors was also inspired by the book. Malkin was also portrayed by Oscar Isaac in the 2018 movie Operation Finale (with Ben Kingsley as Eichmann) and by Chaim Topol (as a character named Michael) in the 1979 film The House on Garibaldi Street.

== Published works ==
- Malkin, Peter Z.; Stein, Harry (1990). Eichmann in My Hands: A Compelling First-Person Account by the Israeli Agent Who Captured Hitler's Chief Executioner. Warner Books. ISBN 0-446-51418-7.
