= Isser Harel =

Israeli intelligence officer (1912–2003)

- איסר הראל
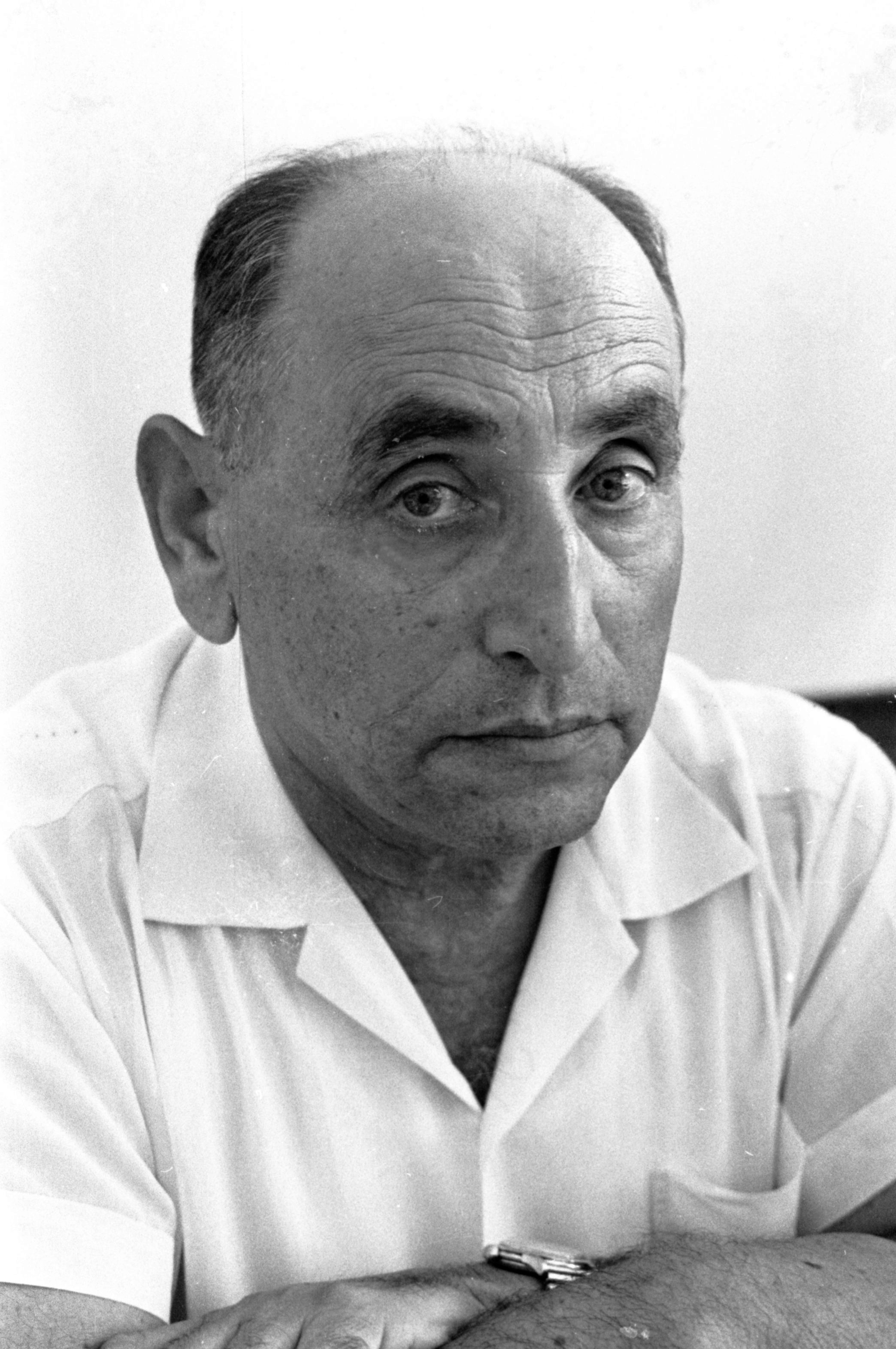

2nd Director of the Mossad
- In office January 1, 1952 – March 25, 1963
- Prime Minister: David Ben Gurion
- Preceded by: Reuven Shiloah
- Succeeded by: Meir Amit

Member of the Knesset
- In office 1969–1974

Personal details
- Born: Isser Natanovich Halperin; 1912 Vitebsk, Russian Empire
- Died: 18 February 2003 (aged 90–91)
- Party: National List
- Children: 1
- Nickname: Little Isser

Isser Harel (Hebrew: איסר הראל; 1912 – 18 February 2003) was spymaster of the intelligence and the security services of Israel and the director of the Mossad (1952–1963). In his capacity as Mossad director, he oversaw the capture and covert transportation to Israel of Holocaust organizer Adolf Eichmann.

Harel was the only individual in the history of the State of Israel to hold a position that consolidated both internal and external intelligence responsibilities.

== Biography ==
=== Childhood and youth ===
Isser Harel was born as Isser Natanovich Halperin in 1912 in the city of Vitebsk (in modern-day Belarus), then within the Pale of Settlement of the Russian Empire, as the fourth child to a wealthy Jewish family. His father, Rabbi Natan-Neta Halperin, was a graduate of the Lithuanian Volozhin Yeshiva, and his mother, Yocheved (née Levin), was a homemaker, the daughter of a wealthy local Jewish industrialist. His exact birthdate is unknown; it was recorded in his father's Talmud volume, but the book was lost due to the upheavals of the Russian Revolution and World War I. The Halperin family owned a vinegar factory in Vitebsk, a gift from his maternal grandfather, who had held a concession to produce vinegar in large parts of Tsarist Russia.

Whilst six years old, the Russian Civil War broke out, and Vitebsk changed hands several times between the Whites and the Reds. He once attended a speech given by Leon Trotsky in his city. The Soviet regime confiscated the family's property, and they suffered from hunger.

In 1922, the family left the Soviet Union and relocated to the city of Daugavpils in independent Latvia. On their way, Soviet soldiers robbed them of their remaining possessions. In Daugavpils, he received a formal education, completing elementary school and beginning high school studies. In his book Security and Democracy, he describes a significant event in the city related to Rabbi Meir Simcha of Dvinsk, who served as the local rabbi. He writes that during a particularly rainy winter, the local river overflowed, threatening to breach the dam and flood the city. Rabbi Meir Simcha prayed for mercy, and shortly afterward, the waters began to recede, saving the city.

As he grew older, his Jewish national consciousness awakened, and he joined a Zionist youth movement. At the age of 16, Halperin left for hachshara (agricultural training) in preparation for aliyah to Mandatory Palestine. During his year of training, he worked in agriculture, aspiring to join a kibbutz. In 1929, following the outbreak of the 1929 Arab riots, his group decided to expedite their immigration to Palestine to support the Yishuv. At 17, Halperin obtained forged documents that claimed he was 18, which allowed him to receive a certificate of immigration (certificat) from the British Mandate. In early 1930, he immigrated to Palestine, crossing Europe from north to south and boarding a ship in Genoa. He carried a pistol, which he concealed in a loaf of bread.

=== In Mandatory Palestine ===
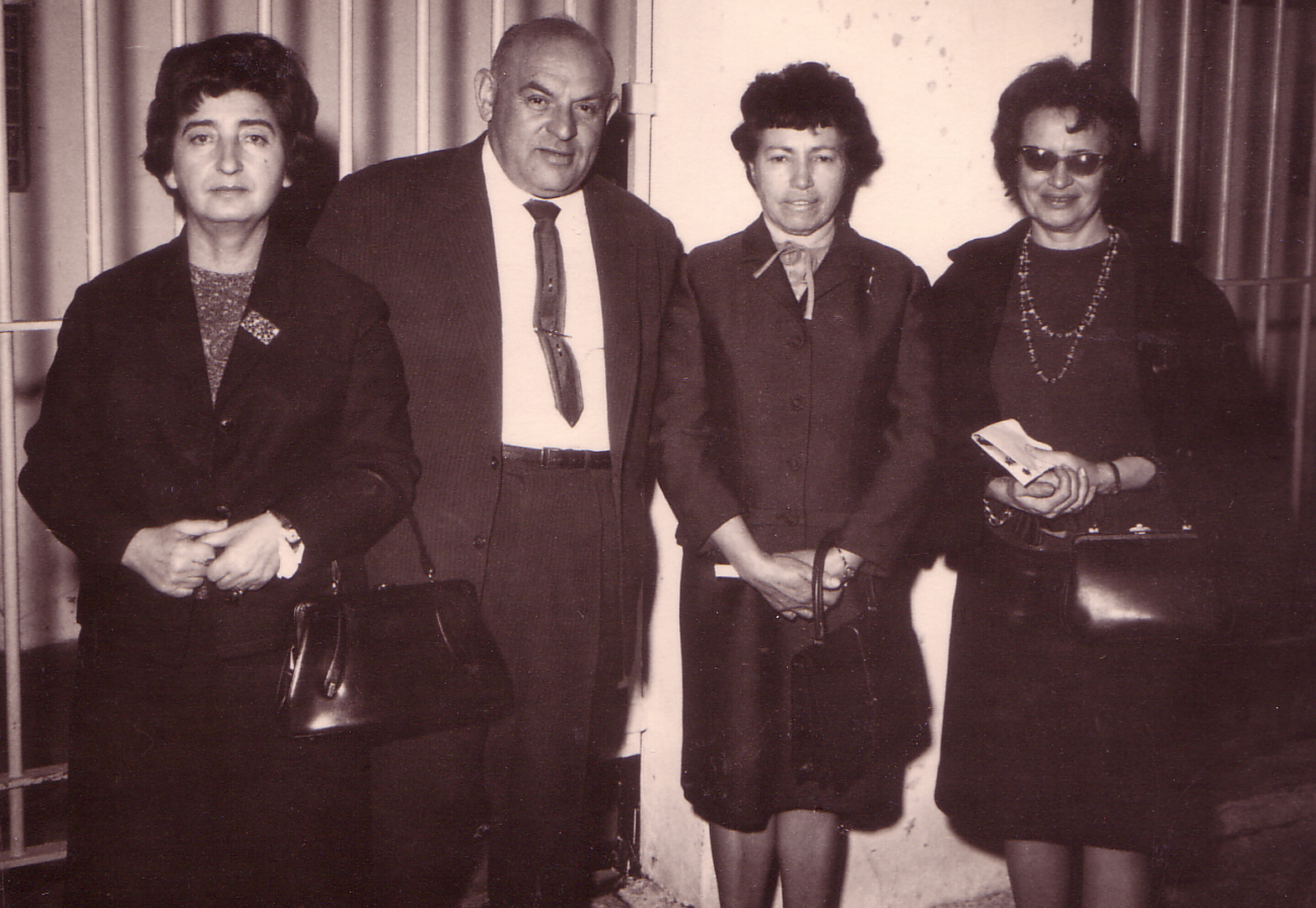
Rivka Harel, Isser Harel's wife, second from the right. Far left is Malka Braverman, the first woman to serve as deputy head of the Mossad

In Palestine, Isser Halperin joined the group from HaKibbutz HaMeuhad that founded Kibbutz Shfayim. Initially, he worked as a pioneer in the citrus orchards of the Sharon plain and in a packing house. During this time, he married Rivka, his kibbutz companion. In 1935, Halperin and his wife decided to bring their families to Palestine. Halperin took out loans to finance their immigration, and both families came to live with them in the kibbutz. He asked the kibbutz for help repaying the loans, but his request was denied. As a result, the three families left the kibbutz and moved to Herzliya. They lived communally in a dilapidated hut, earning their livelihood as packing house workers. Eventually, Halperin began working as a contractor installing irrigation pipes in orchards, and the family emerged from their financial difficulties. Halperin and Rivka had one daughter.

=== Intelligence in the Pre-State Era ===
With the outbreak of World War II, Halperin felt he could not continue his profitable work while his friends enlisted in the British Army or the Palmach. In 1942, he approached the Haganah in Herzliya and volunteered. This was during the period when Erwin Rommel's German forces were advancing toward Palestine (a period known as the "200 Days of Dread"). The Haganah decided that priority should be given to the defense of the land and sent Halperin to a Haganah commander's course. Upon returning from the course, he was assigned to the coastal guard in British uniforms, but his main activity was within the Haganah's intelligence service, the Shai. Halperin was reassigned from the coastal guard after he assaulted a corrupt British officer who made antisemitic remarks. He was placed in the Jewish Settlement Police (the Notrim) while continuing his role in the Shai.

In 1944, Halperin was summoned by Israel Amir (Zabludovsky), the commander of the Shai, who informed him that he was being assigned to serve in the Shai headquarters in Tel Aviv. This marked the beginning of his long career in commanding positions within the intelligence services of the pre-state Yishuv and later the intelligence community of Israel.

Halperin began working at the Shai headquarters in Tel Aviv at the end of 1944, serving as the secretary of the "Jewish Department." The department was headed by Yosef Karo, and Halperin served as his assistant. The department's role was internal security, and it dealt, among other things, with gathering intelligence on underground movements that did not accept the authority of the national institutions, such as the Irgun and Lehi, as well as on the activities of communists. A few months after starting as the department's secretary, Halperin was appointed to head the department.

In 1947, Halperin name came to the attention of David Ben-Gurion. He was introduced to Ben-Gurion and reported on the activities of his department. During that meeting, Ben-Gurion decided to rename the "Jewish Department" to the "Internal Department." Halperin succeeded in his role and became an unofficial spokesman for the Shai. He maintained fair relations with members of other underground movements, who were under his department's surveillance.

At the Shai headquarters, Halperin earned the nickname "Isser the Small," both due to his short stature and to distinguish him from "Isser the Great," Isser Be'eri (Birenzweig), who joined the Shai headquarters in 1947 and was tall in stature. Be'eri later became the head of Israeli Military Intelligence, but was dismissed following the Ali Qassem Abed al-Qader affair.

In 1947, Halperin was appointed the commander of the Tel Aviv District of the Shai, responsible for gathering intelligence from Arab Jaffa. This was a challenging period for the Shai, following Black Saturday and due to the decline in the number of Arab informants, a result of the national awakening among Jaffa's Arabs leading up to the War of Independence. Halperin took steps to recruit new sources and succeeded in doing so. Shortly before the declaration of the State of Israel, Halperin deployed an Arab agent on a mission to Amman to assess Jordan's intentions and whether they planned to go to war. The agent reported that the Jordanians intended to join the war, and Halperin hurried to inform Ben-Gurion.

=== Intelligence in the State of Israel ===
Upon the establishment of the State of Israel, Halperin was given the rank of Lieutenant Colonel, then one of the highest ranks, just below Colonel (the rank of Aluf-Mishneh was only added in 1950, and the rank of Tat Aluf was introduced only after the Six-Day War). He was appointed to head the "Shin Bet" (General Security Service), a branch of the IDF. (Later, the service became an independent organization outside the IDF framework, also known as the Shin Bet).

The service under Halperin's leadership had to be built from scratch, determining its principles, organizational structure, and methods of operation. One of the basic principles he established was that the employees of the organization had to be full-fledged government employees, with appropriate ranking, salary, and social benefits, without the special privileges and perks typically associated with secret service personnel in undemocratic countries. Another principle set by Halperin was that employees had to maintain a high moral standard, with no criminal background and no adventurist tendencies. This principle, he claimed, was not adopted by military intelligence at that time, leading to scandals such as the Avri Elad and Mordechai Kedar cases.

Halperin also decided to break down the political and party-based barriers that existed before the establishment of the state. He employed, without distinction, former members of the Haganah, Palmach, Irgun, and Lehi in the Shin Bet and later in the Mossad. This inclusive approach allowed individuals such as Yitzhak Shamir, a former commander of the Lehi and later Prime Minister of Israel, to be integrated into Israel's intelligence services. This policy contrasted with the prevailing sentiment of the time, expressed by David Ben-Gurion in his policy of "Without Herut and Maki", which marginalized members of the political right. Employing right-wing figures in government institutions was not common practice.

During the 1948 Arab–Israeli War, the Shin Bet was primarily engaged in internal security matters. After the war, the service expanded its operations to include counter-espionage and the monitoring of Israeli Arabs for intelligence purposes.

=== Involvement with Ben-Gurion and political surveillance ===
At this time, Halperin grew closer to Prime Minister and Minister of Defense David Ben-Gurion. Much of the information he provided Ben-Gurion around 1951 pertained to subversive activities against the state. However, in addition to providing intelligence of national importance, Halperin also supplied politically charged information, including recommendations for actions by Mapai (Ben-Gurion's party) and details of developments within opposition parties.

In 1951, the Mossad for Intelligence and Special Operations was established, with Reuven Shiloah as its head. In September 1952, Shiloah resigned and suggested to David Ben-Gurion that Halperin Halperin (now known as Isser Harel) replace him.

== Head of the Mossad ==
On 22 September 1952, Harel was appointed head of the newly established Mossad. From his appointment until his resignation on 25 March 1963, Harel also held responsibility for the Shin Bet, where the head of the Shin Bet was subordinate to his directives. This dual role earned Harel the title "Mossad Chief" or "The Head of Israeli Security Services." To emphasize this hierarchy, the Mossad was officially referred to as the "Central Institute for Intelligence and Security" (later renamed the "Mossad for Intelligence and Special Tasks"). After Harel's resignation in 1963, the dual role was abolished and has never been reinstated. Isser Harel was the only individual in the history of the State of Israel to hold a position that consolidated both internal and external intelligence responsibilities, giving him unprecedented power. Harel participated in leadership meetings of the ruling Mapai party, where he would also report on the activities of opposition parties.

For eleven years, Harel served as the head of Israeli intelligence services, during which time the organizational structures and operational methods of the security services were formed and refined. These years also saw significant intelligence and security achievements. In 1953, the Shin Bet successfully exposed the right-wing extremist underground, leading to the prosecution of its members. However, some critics claimed that Harel exhibited authoritarian behavior and tended to bypass legal boundaries when necessary, as seen in the case of Operation Bren, where the body of an Israeli officer suspected of selling military secrets to Egypt was secretly disposed of following his accidental death during his arrest.

=== Cold War context and domestic surveillance ===
During the 1950s, at the height of the Cold War, Ben-Gurion determined that Israel's orientation would be pro-Western. Within a short time, the Soviet Union, once friendly toward Israel, became its major adversary. This was during the final years of Joseph Stalin, who, in his growing paranoia, turned his ire against Jews, leading to an antisemitic campaign that included the Doctors' plot, in which Jewish doctors were accused of conspiring to assassinate him. As reports of the plot began circulating in January 1953, relations between the Soviet Union and Israel began to deteriorate rapidly. Following the Soviet legation bombing in Tel Aviv, relations between the two countries were formally severed.

Isser Harel, concerned that pro-Soviet parties in Israel might act against Israeli interests and align with the Soviet Union if a global conflict erupted, directed surveillance against the Israeli Communist Party (formerly the Palestine Communist Party), which had been under the surveillance of the Shai since the Mandate period. This surveillance continued under the Shin Bet. In this context, Harel authorized an operation that later became a source of significant controversy: the surveillance and wiretapping of Mapam—a mainstream, Zionist leftist party with Marxist leanings, particularly due to the pro-Soviet stance of some of its members, such as Moshe Sneh.

Harel, worried about Sneh's influence and the pro-Soviet faction within Mapam, ordered a wiretap to be placed in the office of Meir Ya'ari, one of the party's leaders. On 28 January 1953, two Shin Bet agents were caught by Mapam members while installing the wiretap in Ya'ari's office. The incident sparked a public scandal. Shortly afterward, Sneh and his followers broke away from Mapam to form the "Left Faction," advocating a more openly pro-Soviet policy, and eventually left the party altogether. Although the wiretap operation created a political firestorm, the intelligence gained from it was significant.

Harel was also instrumental in the arrest of Aharon Cohen, one of the leaders of Mapam and a prominent figure in the Kibbutz Artzi movement, who was convicted of espionage in 1958 after meeting with a Soviet diplomat. Cohen's arrest and subsequent conviction sent shockwaves through the Israeli left, as he was considered a mainstream leader within the party. Harel argued that Cohen's actions went beyond legitimate political meetings and crossed into criminal espionage.

=== The "Particular Weekly" incident ===
Harel's concern with internal security extended beyond political parties. He became increasingly worried about the influence of Uri Avnery's weekly magazine, "HaOlam HaZeh", which was known for its anti-establishment stance and its harsh criticism of the Ben-Gurion government and the ruling Mapai party. In response, Harel authorized the funding of a competing weekly magazine, "Rimon", which was designed to attract readers away from "HaOlam HaZeh" by offering a similar, sensational style of journalism. The effort was a failure—Rimon failed to gain significant readership and quickly folded. This attempt to subvert a legitimate media outlet using state funds was widely criticized and is considered a low point in Harel's career.

=== Resignation and the German Scientists Affair ===
Harel's long and distinguished career came to an end in 1963, in the wake of the German scientists in Egypt affair.

This incident involved a group of German scientists who were assisting the Egyptian government in developing advanced rocket technology, which posed a significant threat to Israel. Harel viewed the presence of these scientists as a grave danger and launched a covert campaign to intimidate and disrupt their work. Mossad agents in Europe attempted to discourage the scientists through a variety of means, including sending threatening letters and engaging in sabotage.

However, after two Mossad operatives were caught in Switzerland for issuing threats against one of the scientists’ daughters, Prime Minister David Ben-Gurion ordered the Mossad to halt its operations. Harel, convinced that the scientists represented an existential threat to Israel, strongly disagreed with Ben-Gurion's decision. He believed that Ben-Gurion underestimated the danger and felt that the Prime Minister's focus on maintaining positive relations with West Germany was misguided.

Despite Harel's protests, Ben-Gurion stood firm. Faced with this disagreement, Harel resigned from his post as head of the Mossad and Shin Bet in March 1963. His resignation marked the end of an era in Israeli intelligence, as Harel had been the central figure in shaping the country's security services since their inception. Harel's departure from the intelligence community left a lasting legacy, but also set the stage for years of tension between him and his successors, particularly Meir Amit, who replaced him as head of the Mossad.

== Major achievements ==
Harel's tenure was marked by major intelligence successes. One of the most notable was the acquisition of the secret speech delivered by Nikita Khrushchev at the 20th Congress of the Communist Party of the Soviet Union in 1956. In the speech, Khrushchev denounced Stalin's crimes, a major shift in Soviet policy. The exact content of the speech was considered highly valuable intelligence, but most Western intelligence agencies failed to obtain it. However, a Polish Jewish journalist named Wiktor Grajewski secured a copy of the speech and passed it to the Israeli embassy in Warsaw. The embassy, in turn, sent it to the Shin Bet. After verifying its authenticity, the Mossad shared the document with the CIA, which greatly enhanced the Mossad's standing within the global intelligence community.

=== Capture of Adolf Eichmann ===
The highlight of Harel's career came in 1960 with the capture of Adolf Eichmann, one of the key architects of the Holocaust.

In 1957, members of the West German government provided Israel with information that Adolf Eichmann was hiding in Argentina under the name "Ricardo Klement". Eichmann, as director of Department IV-B4 of Nazi Germany's Reich Security Main Office (RSHA) during the Second World War, had played a crucial role in the planning and execution of the so-called "Final Solution to the Jewish Question". Israeli prime minister David Ben-Gurion believed that seeking Eichmann's extradition from Argentina by legal and diplomatic methods would be unsuccessful. In 1959, he placed Harel in charge of the operation to locate, seize, and secretly extract Eichmann from Argentina, with the intention of returning him to Israel to stand trial. In April 1960, Harel's team of agents arrived in Buenos Aires, and tracked Eichmann to a residence in the San Fernando neighborhood of the city. Harel followed soon after. On May 11, they kidnapped Eichmann as he walked from a bus stop to his home. Days later, Eichmann was drugged and clandestinely placed on an Israeli diplomatic aircraft, disguised as a crew member. He was flown to Tel Aviv. According to Harel himself, when he arrived back in Israel with the captured Eichmann, Harel went to Ben-Gurion's office and told the prime minister:

"I've brought you a present. Eichmann is here."

Eichmann was convicted and executed in 1962. This operation not only represented a major victory for the Israeli intelligence services but also had a profound impact on public awareness of the Holocaust worldwide. Harel later chronicled the operation in his bestselling book, "The House on Garibaldi Street", which was adapted into a film in 1979.

=== Additional operations and challenges ===
During Harel's tenure, the Mossad was also involved in the pursuit of Josef Mengele, the infamous "Angel of Death" from Auschwitz. While efforts to capture Mengele were extensive, they ultimately failed, and his location in Brazil was only confirmed after his death.

The Shin Bet also achieved a major success in 1961 with the exposure of Israel Beer, a prominent IDF officer and military commentator, as a Soviet spy. Bar was convicted and sentenced to ten years in prison. In the same year, another notable espionage case involved the arrest of Kurt Sitte, a professor of physics at the Technion, who was discovered to be spying for Czechoslovakia. While this case did not have the same impact as Bar's, it was still significant in highlighting the vulnerability of Israel to Soviet-bloc intelligence operations.

Another major incident during Harel's tenure was the Yossele Schumacher affair, which began in 1960 when Yossele Schumacher, a boy from a secular Jewish family, was kidnapped by his ultra-Orthodox grandfather, Nachman Shtarkes, and taken to the United States to be raised in a religious environment. Despite extensive efforts to locate the child, the case baffled Israeli authorities. Eventually, in 1962, Harel assigned the case to the Mossad, which successfully tracked Schumacher to an ultra-Orthodox community in Brooklyn. The boy was returned to his parents, and the case became a landmark in Israel's internal security operations.

== Public service ==
After his resignation, Harel maintained a low profile for several years, focusing on writing about his experiences in the intelligence community. However, in 1965, amid the political turmoil surrounding the split within the ruling Mapai party, Harel was invited by Prime Minister Levi Eshkol to serve as a security advisor. This move was seen as part of Eshkol's effort to distance himself from the influence of David Ben-Gurion and his new political faction, Rafi, which included key figures like Shimon Peres and Moshe Dayan. Harel accepted the position, but his role was largely symbolic, and he resigned in June 1966 after concluding that he lacked meaningful authority in the government.

Harel continued to be involved in public life through his writing and his outspoken views on national security matters. His books, such as The House on Garibaldi Street and The Great Deception, offered insights into the world of Israeli intelligence and earned him recognition as a leading authority on security issues.

=== Political career ===
In 1969, Harel entered politics, joining the National List, a party founded by Ben-Gurion after his split from the Labor Alignment. Harel was elected to the Knesset in 1969 and served as a member of the seventh Knesset until 1974. During his time in the Knesset, Harel focused on security issues. His political career, however, was short-lived, as the State List failed to gain significant traction in subsequent elections.

== Later life and death ==
In his later years, Harel became a prolific author, writing extensively about his experiences in intelligence and security. His books, including The House on Garibaldi Street and Security and Democracy, became key texts for understanding Israel's intelligence operations during its formative years. Harel's views on security, especially his staunch opposition to any form of accommodation with enemies of the state, influenced Israeli policy for years after his retirement.

Isser Harel died on February 18, 2003, at the age of 91. He is remembered as one of Israel's founding fathers of intelligence, whose leadership and vision helped to secure the state during its most vulnerable early years.

== Legacy ==
Isser Harel remains one of the most influential figures in the history of Israeli intelligence. His pioneering work in establishing and leading the Shin Bet and the Mossad shaped both organizations into formidable security agencies known for their effectiveness and reach. Under his leadership, Israeli intelligence made significant strides, from the capture of Adolf Eichmann to the disruption of Soviet espionage activities in Israel.

Streets and public institutions have been named in his honor, including "Isser Harel Street" in cities like Netanya and Herzliya. Harel's contributions to Israel's security apparatus continue to be studied and respected by generations of intelligence professionals.

== Published works ==
- The Great Deceit: a Political Novel (1971) (in Hebrew)
- Jihad (1972) (in Hebrew)
- The House on Garibaldi Street (1975) (in Hebrew)
- The Anatomy of Treason (1980) (in Hebrew)
- Operation Yossele (1982) (in Hebrew)
- The Crisis of the German Scientists (1982) (in Hebrew)
- Brother Against Brother: the Authorized Comprehensive Analyses of the Lavon Affair (1982) (in Hebrew)
- The Truth About the Kastner Murder (1985) (in Hebrew)
- Soviet Espionage (1987) (in Hebrew)
- Security and Democracy (1989) (in Hebrew)
