= Nazis and Nazi Collaborators (Punishment) Law =

Israeli criminal law

Nazis and Nazi Collaborators (Punishment) Law, 5710–1950

Knesset
- Passed by: Knesset
- Passed: 1 August 1950
- Signed by: David Ben-Gurion; Pinchas Rosen; Yosef Sprinzak
- Signed: 9 August 1950

Legislative history
- Introduced: 27 March 1950
- Status: Current legislation

The Nazis and Nazi Collaborators (Punishment) Law (Hebrew: חוק לעשיית דין בנאצים ובעוזריהם, תש"י-1950) is a 1950 Israeli law passed by the First Knesset that provides a legal framework for the prosecution of crimes against Jews and other persecuted people committed in Nazi Germany, German-occupied Europe, or territory under the control of another Axis power between 1933 and 1945. The law's primary target was Jewish Holocaust survivors alleged to have collaborated with the Nazis, in particular prisoner functionaries ("kapos") and the Jewish Ghetto Police. It was motivated by the anger of survivors against perceived collaborators and a desire to "purify" the community.

The law criminalizes crimes against humanity, war crimes, and "crimes against the Jewish people", as well as a variety of lesser offenses. It has a number of unusual provisions, including ex post facto application, extraterritoriality, a relaxation in the usual rules of evidence, and mandatory death sentence for the most serious crimes laid out in the law.

Under the law, around forty alleged Jewish collaborators were put on trial between 1951 and 1972, of whom two-thirds were convicted. Such trials were highly controversial and have been criticized by judges and legal scholars due to the moral dilemma of judging someone who was also persecuted and under threat of death at the time the offense was committed. Three non-Jews were prosecuted under the law, including the high-profile cases of Adolf Eichmann (1961) and John Demjanjuk (1987). Although both Eichmann's and Demjanjuk's lawyers challenged the validity of the law, it was upheld by both Israeli and United States courts.

== Background ==
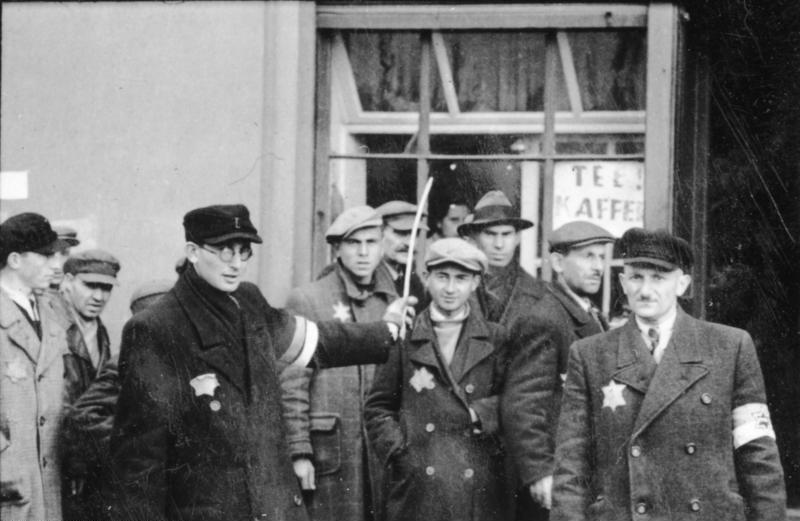
Jewish Ghetto Police in Łódź Ghetto, 1940

The Holocaust was a genocide committed primarily by Nazi Germany that claimed the lives of six million Jews living in Germany and German-occupied Europe. Many Jews were forced into Nazi ghettos where a Jewish leadership (known as Judenrat) and Jewish Ghetto Police were appointed to execute Nazi orders. Refusal to hand over other Jews to the Nazis to be killed could result in execution. The Jewish Ghetto Police was perceived as "the most hated Jewish organ during the Holocaust", according to Rivka Brot. In Nazi concentration camps, a small number of Jews were recruited to become prisoner functionaries known as "kapos", which had the responsibility of supervising other prisoners and executing the orders of concentration camp guards. Not all prisoner functionaries were collaborators; some were considered to have "behaved honorably". Becoming a kapo could mean the difference between a chance to survive and near-certain death. However, among other survivors functionaries are remembered for their brutality; survivors often charged that Jewish kapos were "worse than the Germans".

Following World War II, some alleged collaborators were subject to extrajudicial violence and even murder from other Holocaust survivors. In order to maintain order, postwar Jewish communities in displaced-persons camps set up "honor courts" that would judge alleged collaborators, handing down sentences of public condemnation and social ostracism. Similar clashes also erupted in Mandatory Palestine and informal honor courts were operated by landsmanshaften (organizations for immigrants from a certain country) and the World Zionist Congress. After World War II, many Holocaust survivors immigrated to Israel; by the late 1950s, they consisted one-quarter of the population.

While some Holocaust survivors preferred to leave the past behind them, others thought that the new state should be pure of collaborators with the Nazis. Beginning in 1948, some Holocaust survivors brought petitions to the Israel Police alleging that other Holocaust survivors were Nazi collaborators, but there was no legal basis for prosecution in these cases. According to legal scholars Orna Ben-Naftali and Yogev Tuval, the drafters of the Nazis and Nazi Collaborators (Punishment) Law saw its purpose in pragmatic terms as assuaging the anger among Holocaust survivors in Israel. This is disputed by other writers who argue that there were only a few dozen complaints among a large number of survivors, which could not be considered popular demand. Understanding of how the Nazi genocide was carried out was limited in Israeli society at the time the law was passed.

== Legislative history ==
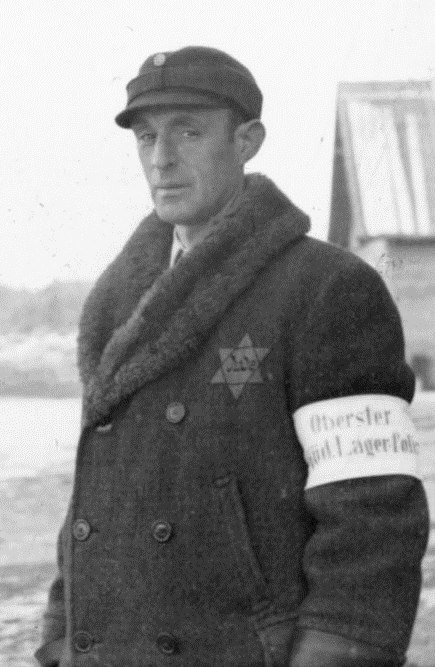
Jewish Camp Policeman in Salaspils camp

An "Act against Jewish War Criminals" was drafted in August 1949 by Deputy Attorney General Haim Wilkenfeld. On 26 December 1949, the Crime of Genocide (Prevention and Punishment) Law was introduced to the first plenary session of the First Knesset. A law without retrospective application that would codify the 1948 Genocide Convention into Israeli law, it was eventually passed on 29 March 1950.

On 27 March 1950, Minister of Justice Pinkhas Rosen introduced the bill to prosecute Nazi collaborators, now renamed "Nazis and Nazi Collaborators (Punishment) Law", to the Knesset with an expanded scope that, in theory, would enable the prosecution of Holocaust perpetrators as well as collaborators. Rosen said, "It is assumed that Nazi criminals, who could be charged on the basis of the crimes included in the law, would not dare come to Israel." Instead, "the law will apply less to Nazis than to their Jewish collaborators who are here in the State of Israel", Rosen said, invoking the Hebrew phrase "let our camp be pure", derived from Deuteronomy 23:14. Some Knesset members, including Hanan Rubin and Eri Jabotinsky, believed that Nazis might eventually be tried under the law either via extradition or other means. However, the majority saw the provision for the prosecution of Nazis as symbolic rather than a genuine possibility.

Knesset members debated exactly what form the punishment of Nazi collaborators would take. Nahum Nir and Yona Kesse argued for an institutionalized version of the honor courts that would be heard by a jury (in Israel, all trials are heard by a judge) and perhaps dispense moral rather than legal punishments. This proposal was rejected both out of a desire for harsh punishments and to avoid fragmenting the legal system. Ya'akov Gil, the former chief rabbi of the Jewish Brigade, sponsored a successful proposal to add the offense "crimes against the Jewish people" to the law, in addition to war crimes and crimes against humanity.

Lawmakers explicitly rejected a proposal by Zerach Warhaftig (United Religious Front) that would have distinguished offenses by Nazis and collaborators. Wilkenfeld explained, "If a Nazi in a concentration camp beat inmates, and a Jewish kapo in the same camp did the same – how can we create a provision for each of them?" Warhaftig rejected this, saying "The Nazi was a murderer and the Jew was forced to act as he did". He was in the minority; the final version of the law made no distinction between acts committed by an SS guard and a Jewish prisoner.

Mapam politician Yisrael Bar-Yehuda strongly rejected a suggestion to permit excusing conduct under duress or in self-defense:

I am opposed to … this kind of person being relieved [of legal responsibility] because he did what he did out of cowardice. If a person was told that if he did not kill another person, his daughter would be raped and killed, and, to save his daughter, he killed someone else, he is not, to my mind, relieved of criminal responsibility, even if he did all he could to prevent it.

This attitude was based ideologically on his party's close association with the Zionist youth movements that led ghetto uprisings, often in opposition to the Jewish leadership. From this point of view, anyone who joined the Judenrat or the Jewish Ghetto Police, or became a kapo, was automatically considered a traitor. This strict view was opposed by members of other parties, including Warhaftig, who did not see joining such institutions as a criminal act in of itself. In the end, the Knesset adopted a strict and limited form of exculpation, also rejecting Bar-Yehuda's suggestion that anyone who served in the underground should be granted immunity.

The law originally carried a 20-year statute of limitations from the time the offense was committed for offenses less serious than murder, which was retroactively repealed in 1963.

== Provisions ==
Article 1 covers crimes against humanity, war crimes, and "crimes against the Jewish people", all of which carry a mandatory death sentence unless an extenuating circumstance under Section 11(b) can be proven, in which case the minimum sentence is 10 years in prison. The definitions for crimes against humanity and war crimes are very similar to the definitions in the Nuremberg Charter, except that the time period covered is extended to the beginning of the Nazi regime rather than the outbreak of World War II. "Crimes against the Jewish people" is based on the wording of the 1948 Genocide Convention. Unlike the Genocide Convention, "destroying or desecrating Jewish religious or cultural assets and values" (a.k.a. cultural genocide) and "inciting to hatred of Jews" (as opposed to incitement to genocide) are included in "crimes against the Jewish people". To be prosecutable under the law, the crimes must have been committed in an "enemy country" (Nazi Germany, German-occupied Europe, or territory controlled by another Axis power). The law is limited to one victim group (Jews), one time period (1933–1945), and one location (Europe), whereas the Genocide Convention is of universal applicability.

Articles 2 to 6 define offenses that do not carry a mandatory death penalty. Article 2 covers various "crimes against persecuted persons" which are derived from the standard criminal code and applied as if they had been committed in Israel. Article 3 outlaws "membership in enemy organization"; its language parallels the Nuremberg Charter's language against criminal organizations. Article 4 covers offenses committed "in a place of confinement... against a persecuted person", which are also derived from the Israeli criminal code. This article was intended to cover crimes by functionaries in concentration camps and ghettos which were not severe enough to fall under Article 1. Article 6 criminalizes "delivering up persecuted person to enemy administration", which according to Ben-Naftali and Tuval was primarily aimed at the actions of Jewish councils. Article 7 criminalizes the blackmail of persecuted persons, with an up to seven-year sentence if the accused "received or demanded a benefit (a) from a persecuted person under threat of delivering up him or another persecuted person to an enemy administration; or (b) from a person who had given shelter to a persecuted person, under threats of delivering up him or the persecuted person sheltered by him to an enemy administration". According to Ben-Naftali and Tuval, these last two articles are the only ones that make an (implicit) distinction between perpetrators and collaborators.

Article 10 enumerates the circumstances that would lead to the acquittal of the defendant: if he acted to save himself from the danger of immediate death, or if his actions were intended to avoid worse consequences. Such circumstances did not excuse any of Article 1 crimes or murder. Article 11 lays out the only two circumstances that can be taken into account for the mitigation of sentencing: "that the person committed the offence under conditions which... would have exempted him from criminal responsibility or constituted a reason for pardoning the offence", assuming that the accused tried to mitigate the consequence of the offence, or that it was committed with the intent to avoid a more serious outcome.

Several provisions in the law are considered "exceptional":

- It applies to past events (ex post facto law) that occurred before the creation of Israel;
- The law applies extraterritorially to crimes committed exclusively outside of Israel;
- A mandatory death sentence is instituted for crimes under Article 1;
- Trying a defendant twice for the same offense is allowed;
- Many usual defenses are banned, including the necessity defense;
- The court may deviate from the usual rules of evidence "if it is satisfied that this will promote the ascertainment of the truth and the just handling of the case".

== Trials ==
=== Kapo trials ===
Within fifteen months of the law being passed, the Israel Police received at least 350 complaints from Holocaust survivors. Some individuals fled the country, fearing prosecution. In the first six months, the Attorney General indicted at least fifteen people under the law, charging them all with at least four counts of crimes including crimes against humanity. Prosecutors initially considered anyone who served as a functionary as guilty until proven innocent and in league with the Nazis. Through 1952, verdicts were harsh with judges handing down an average five years' imprisonment. In 1952, Yehezkel Enigster / Jungster was convicted of crimes against humanity and sentenced to death, but this verdict was overturned on appeal by the Israeli Supreme Court and his sentence reduced to two years' imprisonment. After the Enigster case, prosecutors mostly avoided charging Jewish defendants with Article 1 crimes and distinguished them from Holocaust perpetrators.

According to Dan Porat, the 1958 verdict of the Kastner trial (a libel trial in which Rudolf Kastner was eventually cleared of collaborationism) led to another shift: defendants were now viewed as people who had good intentions but committed bad deeds. Following the 1961 trial of Adolf Eichmann, in which prosecutor Gideon Hausner set out to remove the guilt of collaboration from Jewish functionaries, defendants were more often viewed primarily as victims of the Nazis. This paradigm was challenged by the prosecutor David Libai who charged former Jewish policeman Hirsch Barenblat with membership in an enemy organization. If Barenblat had been convicted, it could have led to tens of thousands of other Israeli citizens also being considered guilty; Libai's superiors ordered him to drop the charge in order to avoid this outcome. Although Barenblat was convicted on other charges, his conviction was overturned by the Supreme Court in 1964 as the judges considered it inappropriate to punish those who took up positions as functionaries to save their own lives. Additional trials were held for especially egregious behavior which continued until 1972.

Between 1951 and 1972, around 40 trials were held against Jews accused of collaborating with the Nazis. The exact number is not known because many of the records are sealed by a 1995 court order. In the known cases, two-thirds of defendants were convicted and all but one sentenced to prison, with an average sentence of 28 months. No Jewish defendant was charged with "crimes against the Jewish people". The trials relied almost entirely on witness testimony as most of the alleged crimes left no documentation. Israeli judges and prosecutors, however, realized that not all the witness testimony was reliable as some witnesses' memories were distorted by trauma and others added unverified information to their testimony, for reasons such as desire for retribution. None of those questioned or tried admitted responsibility for wrongdoing.

Israeli historian Idith Zertal writes that the trials

exposed the routine regime of terror, oppression, and abuse in the ghettos and camps, where inmates’ human character and moral stamina were obliterated long before their bodies were consumed, and brought to light the existential and moral hell created by the Nazis, the monstrous upside-down world which had transformed persecuted into persecutors, victims into reluctant wrongdoers and accomplices in their own oppression.

In 2014 journalist Itamar Levin sought access to the files but was refused on privacy grounds. Levin took it to court, but a police officer assigned to examine the files had not reported as of early 2021. Yaacov Lozowick, the state archivist at the time, read 120 of the files himself and believes that public release of the files would for the most part exonerate the people who had been suspects.

=== Trials of non-Jews ===
Only three non-Jews were tried under the law. The very first trial under the law involved Andrej Banik, accused of responsibility for the deportation of Jews from Slovakia; according to Porat, the timing was "clearly chosen for the symbolic value" of trying a non-Jew first. Banik came to Israel with his wife, a Jewish convert to Christianity, but was soon identified as a member of the Hlinka Guard by survivors and first questioned by police before the passage of the law. He was ultimately acquitted because the testimony against him was unreliable; the judges ruled that one witness in particular "either lied intentionally or is suffering from hallucinations and imagines things that he may have experienced which he attributes to the defendant with no basis whatsoever". Other non-Jewish residents of Israel were arrested and charged with being Nazi collaborators, including Alfred Miller, a Hungarian waiter who was accused by a survivor of having handed him over to the Nazis and later cleared without trial. According to Porat, some Jews suspected that all non-Jews were Nazi collaborators due to suffering the experience of betrayal.

==== Adolf Eichmann ====
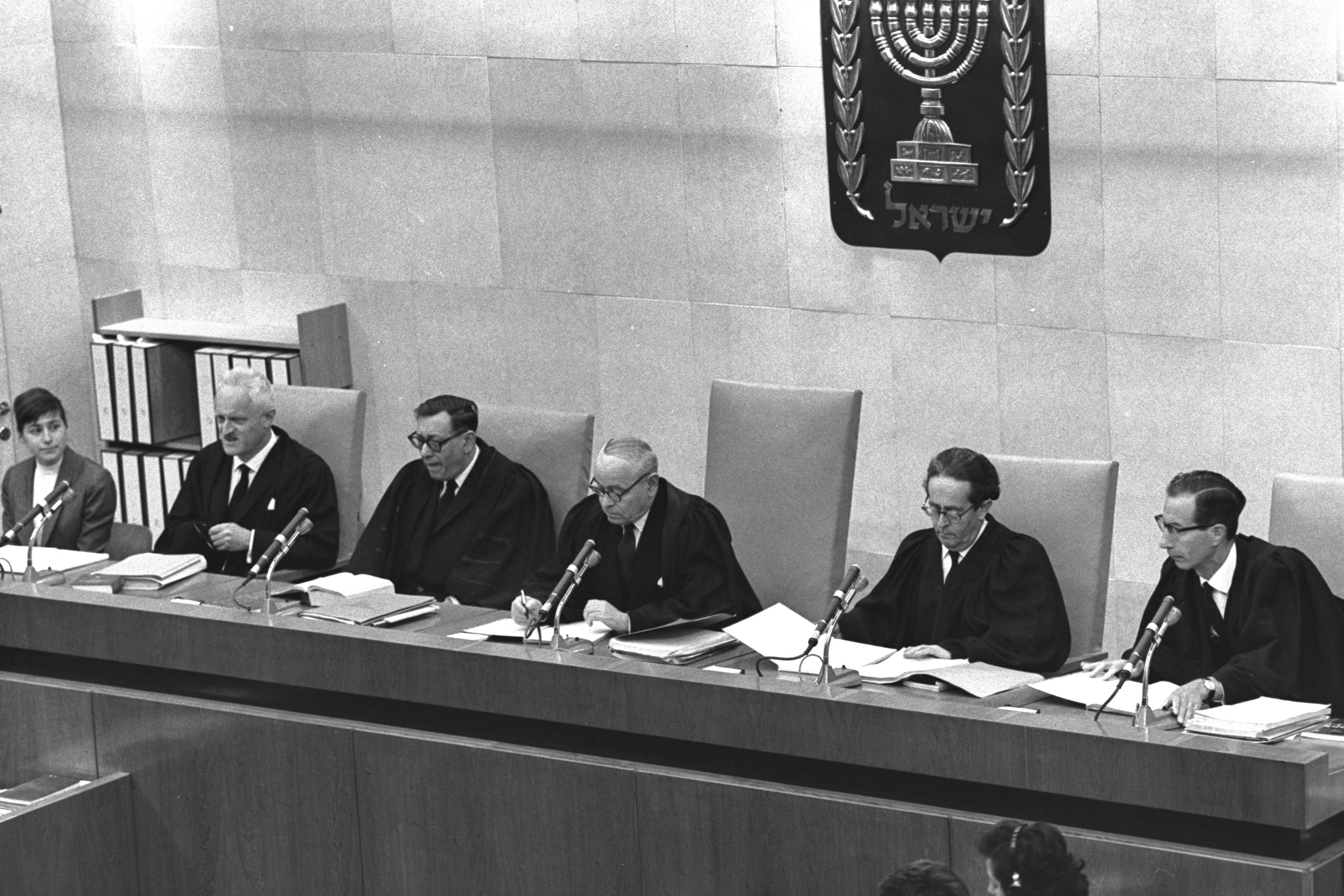
The Israeli Supreme Court hears Eichmann's appeal

In 1960, the major Holocaust perpetrator Adolf Eichmann was kidnapped in Argentina and brought to Israel to stand trial. His trial, which opened on 11 April 1961, was televised and broadcast internationally, intended to educate about the crimes committed against Jews, which had been secondary to the Nuremberg trials. Prosecutor Hausner also tried to challenge the portrayal of Jewish functionaries that had emerged in the earlier trials, showing them at worst as victims forced to carry out Nazi decrees while minimizing the "gray zone" of morally questionable behavior. Hausner later wrote that available archival documents "would have sufficed to get Eichmann sentenced ten times over"; nevertheless, he summoned more than 100 witnesses, most of them who had never met the defendant, for didactic purposes.

Eichmann was charged with fifteen counts of violating the law, including multiple counts of crimes against the Jewish people, crimes against humanity against both Jews and non-Jews, and war crimes. Convicted on all counts, Eichmann was sentenced to death. He appealed to the Supreme Court, which confirmed the convictions and the sentence. President Yitzhak Ben-Zvi rejected Eichmann's request to commute the sentence. In Israel's only judicial execution to date, Eichmann was hanged on 31 May 1962 at Ramla Prison.

==== Ivan Demjanjuk ====
The last trial under the law was that of Ivan Demjanjuk, who was convicted in 1987 of "crimes against the Jewish people", "crimes against humanity", "war crimes", and "crimes against persecuted people". The conviction was based on the testimony of six eyewitnesses who identified him as the notorious guard known as "Ivan the Terrible" at Treblinka extermination camp. Evidence not available to the court at the time cast doubt on this identification, and Demjanjuk's conviction was overturned on appeal by the Supreme Court on the basis of reasonable doubt. In 2011, he was convicted in Germany of assisting in the murder of 28,000 people as a guard at Sobibor extermination camp.

== Reception ==
=== Validity of the law ===
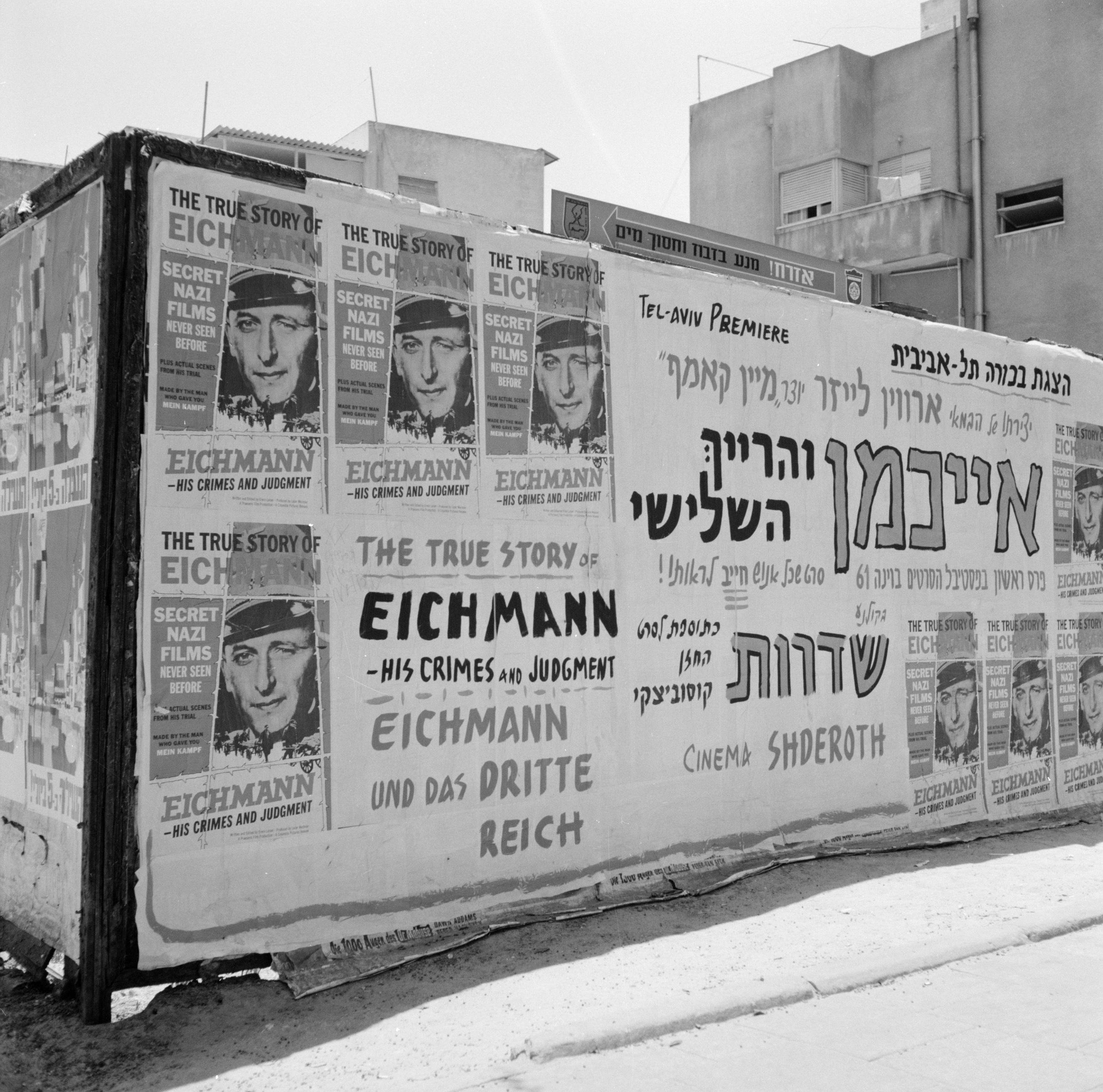
Posters in Tel Aviv after the conviction of Adolf Eichmann, 1964

Eichmann's defense lawyer, Robert Servatius, challenged the jurisdiction of Israeli courts over Eichmann's crimes and the validity of the law because it was ex post facto and extraterritorial. Judge Moshe Landau responded that it was a valid Israeli law. In its judgement the district court extensively justified the law based on precedents in English law. The verdict also stated that "The jurisdiction to try crimes under international law is universal." Servatius also argued that law was invalid because the victims of the crimes punishable by the law were not Israeli citizens at the time. In response, the court stated that it was "the moral duty of every sovereign State... to enforce the natural right to punish, possessed by the victims of the crime whoever they may be, against criminals" who had violated international law.

Servatius again challenged the law during Eichmann's appeal to the Supreme Court, arguing that the law was inconsistent with international law because it tried foreign citizens for actions committed on foreign soil before the creation of Israel. The Supreme Court dismissed the appeal, stating that "The District Court has in its judgment dealt with [these] contentions in an exhaustive, profound and most convincing manner." Nevertheless, the court proceeded to give a full justification for the law according to the international and English law that Israeli law is based on. The court ruled that there was no international principle prohibiting retroactive laws or those which applied to foreign nationals on foreign territory. Furthermore, the law was consistent with international law because it sought to establish international principles in Israeli law.

Demjanjuk's lawyers also challenged the validity of the Israeli law during his extradition proceedings in United States federal court. The United States District Court for the Northern District of Ohio ruled against him. Chief Judge Frank J. Battisti wrote that the law "conforms with the international law principles of 'universal jurisdiction'" and was not unconstitutionally retroactive because it merely provided a legal framework for punishing actions that were already illegal.

=== Application to Holocaust survivors ===
==== Judges and prosecutors ====
Attorney General Haim Cohn filed dozens of indictments under the law. Later, he stated: "[I came] to believe that those of us who did not experience the Holocaust ourselves, have no ability or the right to try a person for his actions, intentions and constraints when he [was trapped in] that Hell". Although Israeli judges were not of one mind about applying the law to Holocaust survivors (those who were more lenient to the accused tended to be survivors themselves), "the verdicts squirm with disquiet about the delegated task at hand", according to law professor Mark A. Drumbl. Among the complaints was that judging the collaborators diminished the guilt of the Nazi perpetrators. Overturning the conviction of Barenblat, Supreme Court judge Yitzhak Olshan found that "this is a question for history and not for the courts".

In his judgement of the same case, Landau wrote:

[I]t would be presumptuous and self-righteous on our part, us who never walked in the shoes of those [who were there] ... to criticize those 'little people' who did not rise to a supreme level of morality, while they were subject to rampant persecution by a regime whose the primary purpose was to wipe out their humanity. We must not interpret the law ... according to a measure of moral behavior that only few were capable of ... [C]riminal law prohibitions, including the Nazi and Nazi Collaborators Law, were not written for exceptional heroes, but for ordinary mortals, with their ordinary weaknesses.

Because the law applied exclusively to past events, it has been characterized as retributive justice. (Note: One judge commented, "This law has almost no intention of deterrence, not in regard to the defendant or another person. I see the rationale of the law… in payback." According to Supreme Court justice Shneur Zalman Cheshin, "The stipulated punishments ... were not, in the main, meant to reform the offender or deter potential offenders, but – as the law’s name suggests – to take revenge on Israel’s enemies.") According to Supreme Court justice Shneur Zalman Cheshin, the law's purpose was "revenge on Israel's enemies".

==== Journalism ====
The kapo trials attracted relatively little press coverage, but many Holocaust survivors attended court to observe the proceedings. According to Israeli journalist Tom Segev, newspapers were reluctant to report on stories considered "filthy and embarrassing". Rivka Brot writes that the framing of the law turned the cases into disputes between survivors which did not interest wider Israeli society.

Following the quashing of the death sentence of Enigster, the editor-in-chief of Yediot Aharonot, Herzl Rosenblum, published an op-ed in the 8 April 1952 edition of the paper praising the verdict. Arguing that no German Holocaust perpetrators were executed primarily for crimes against Jews, Rosenblum contended that it would be unjust "to hang the few Jewish helpers in these circumstances—who did what they did under the most unbearable pressure". He also argued that it was difficult, if not impossible, for someone who had not been in that position to judge, considering that "different moral laws reigned there".

According to a 1962 article in Davar, the Mapai party newspaper, many Israelis felt ambivalent about the trials. "After all, to some degree, they too [the defendants] were, in carrying out their crimes victims of the Nazi beast—moral victims who in their weaknesses participated in an unprecedented crime, and a crime against their people."

==== Academic analysis ====
In a book that they coauthored, law professors Michael Bazyler and Frank Tuerkheimer were unable to agree on a conclusion to the chapter on the kapo trials. Bazyler condemned the "bad law that should never have been passed by the Knesset". He disagreed that any Jewish survivor should be tried under criminal law for such offenses, "because of the extreme, in fact, inconceivable circumstances of Jews in the concentration camps". In contrast, Tuerkheimer argued that "even in the horrid environment of the camp, kapos could make choices. Those who opted for the brutal should not escape punishment simply because they were Jews or concentration camp inmates."

In a separate article, Bazyler and Julia Scheppach argue that the law's "intention most likely was to distance Israelis from what they regarded as the shameful response of Europe’s Jews to their destruction", and should be viewed in light of general hostility and contempt for Holocaust survivors in Israel, who were seen as having gone "like sheep to the slaughter". Zertal argues that trials "in every sense of the word, were purges" and that the law would have been more accurately titled "Law for Punishment of Minor Collaborators of the Nazis". She highlights the fact that for a decade after it was passed, "not one of the defendants tried under the law was charged with or found guilty of directly or indirectly causing the death of a single person".

Porat finds that some prosecutors who took part in the trials forgot them or misleadingly omitted them from discussion of the law. Furthermore, he charges that Israeli institutions such as Yad Vashem omit the issue from their public presentations and in fact "have been suppressing the memory of the kapo trials for fear of tainting the image of the victims". Porat sees this omission as part of a broader trend in which Israelis identify with Holocaust victims, in his view excessively.

Rivka Brot notes that "criminal law recognizes only two outcomes: innocence or guilt". In her view, this is an insufficient frame to deal with the phenomenon of the "gray zone" which existed between these two poles. According to Drumbl, "[l]aw lacked the vocabulary or finesse; the courtroom was a poor conduit" for reckoning with the behavior of kapos and the law's "quest for condemnation, finitude, and clarity effectively constructed the persecuted Jew as a Nazi". Ben-Naftali and Tuval conclude that the law was drafted without consideration for ordinary humans and set out to expel "collaborators" (who in historical terms were also victims) from the imagined community of survivors and instead classify them "into the only other remaining category that the Law recognized: the Nazis".

According to Israeli law professor Mordechai Kremnitzer, the blurring of lines between Holocaust perpetrators and Jewish collaborators in the law is reminiscent of the ideas proposed by Holocaust deniers that Jews were responsible for the crimes against them. Kremnitzer argues that "[c]riminal law should not demand courageous resistance". Therefore, forced participation in collaboration should not be criminalized and the necessity defense should be allowed for any prosecutions of Nazi collaborators. Multiple authors have compared the case of judging kapos to 2010s trials of current or former child soldiers who committed war crimes, such as Dominic Ongwen and Omar Khadr.

== Sources ==
- Bazyler, Michael; Scheppach, Julia (2012). "The Strange and Curious History of the Law Used to Prosecute Adolf Eichmann". Loyola of Los Angeles International and Comparative Law Review. 34 (3): 417–461. ISSN 0277-5417.
- Bazyler, Michael J.; Tuerkheimer, Frank M. (2014). "The Jewish Kapo Trials in Israel: Is There a Place for the Law in the Gray Zone?". Forgotten Trials of the Holocaust. NYU Press. pp. 195–226. ISBN 978-1-4798-8606-7.
- Ben-Naftali, Orna; Tuval, Yogev (2006). "Punishing International Crimes Committed by the Persecuted". Journal of International Criminal Justice. 4 (1): 128–178. doi:10.1093/jicj/mqi022.
- Brot, Rivka (2020). "The illusive collective memory: Revisiting the role of law in Israel's Holocaust narrative". Journal of Israeli History. 38 (1): 77–101. doi:10.1080/13531042.2020.1799526. S2CID 222136004.
- Drumbl, Mark A. (2016). "Victims who victimise". London Review of International Law. 4 (2): 217–246. doi:10.1093/lril/lrw015.
- Drumbl, Mark A. (2019). "Histories of the Jewish 'Collaborator': Exile, Not Guilt". In Tallgren, Immi; Skouteris, Thomas (eds.). The New Histories of International Criminal Law: Retrials. Oxford University Press. pp. 237–252. doi:10.1093/oso/9780198829638.001.0001. ISBN 978-0-19-256513-6.
- Kremnitzer, Mordechai (2020). "An Argument for retributivism in international criminal law". In Jeßberger, Florian; Geneuss, Julia (eds.). Why Punish Perpetrators of Mass Atrocities?: Purposes of Punishment in International Criminal Law. Cambridge University Press. pp. 161–175. ISBN 978-1-108-47514-3.
- Porat, Dan (2019). Bitter Reckoning: Israel Tries Holocaust Survivors as Nazi Collaborators. Harvard University Press. ISBN 978-0-674-24313-2.
- Zertal, Idith (2005). Israel's Holocaust and the Politics of Nationhood. Cambridge University Press. ISBN 978-1-139-44662-4.
