= Kapo =

Collaborationist prisoner at a Nazi camp

- Location: Nazi Germany; Occupied Europe
- Date: 1939–1945
- Incident type: Collaborationism
- Perpetrators: SS-Totenkopfverbände
- Participants: Collaborationist Holocaust victims
- Organizations: Reich Security Main Office; SS Main Economic and Administrative Office
- Victims: Non-collaborationist Holocaust victims

A kapo was a type of prisoner functionary (German: Funktionshäftling) at Nazi concentration and extermination camps. They were, whether voluntary or coerced, collaborators who worked under the Schutzstaffel (SS) to carry out administrative tasks or supervise the forced labour of inmates. Given authority over their fellow prisoners, they would often enjoy comparatively better conditions at the camps, such as increased food rations and less physical brutality from SS guards. Due to their privileged status and actions, kapos were highly resented and were frequently lynched by other prisoners when the camps were liberated by Allied forces during the final stages of World War II.

In the aftermath of World War II, there were many instances of kapos being prosecuted alongside Nazis for their role at the camps. Most notably, the Nazis and Nazi Collaborators (Punishment) Law, which was passed by the government of Israel in 1950, was primarily aimed at providing a framework for prosecution of Jews who had served as kapos during the Holocaust. These efforts were spurred by the collective anger of Holocaust survivors towards Jewish collaborators, whose elimination was regarded as necessary to "purify" the global Jewish community.

Since the Holocaust, the term "kapo" has come to be used as a pejorative in Jewish circles, characterized as "the worst insult a Jew can give another Jew" by The Jewish Chronicle. However, kapos were not exclusively Jewish; Nazi authorities selected them from among any persecuted community in the camps.

== Etymology ==
The word "kapo" could have come from the Italian word for "head" and "boss", capo. According to the Duden, it is derived from the French word for "Corporal" (caporal). Journalist Robert D. McFadden believes that the word "kapo" is derived from the German word Lagercapo, meaning camp captain. Another interpretation is that it is an abbreviation of "Kameradschaftspolizei".

== Reprisals and prosecution ==
=== In Europe ===
Many kapos were subject to reprisals, including mass lynchings, immediately upon the liberation of concentration camps. For example, thousands of prisoners had been transferred from the Mittelbau-Dora camp to the Bergen-Belsen camp in April 1945. While not in good health, these prisoners were in far better condition than those in Bergen-Belsen. Upon the camp's liberation on 15 April 1945, these prisoners attacked their former overseers, lynching roughly 170 Kapos.

During the 1946–47 Stutthof trials in Gdańsk, Poland, in which Stutthof concentration camp personnel were prosecuted, five kapos were found to have used extreme brutality and were sentenced to death. Four of them were executed on 4 July 1946, and one on 10 October 1947. Another was sentenced to three years' imprisonment and one acquitted and released on 29 November 1947.

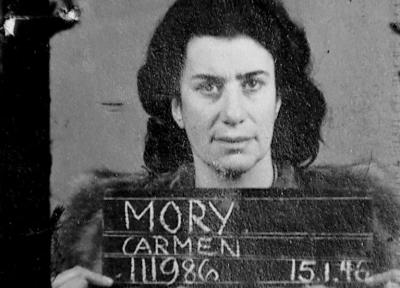
Carmen Mory, Swiss Nazi German spy and kapo in Ravensbrück

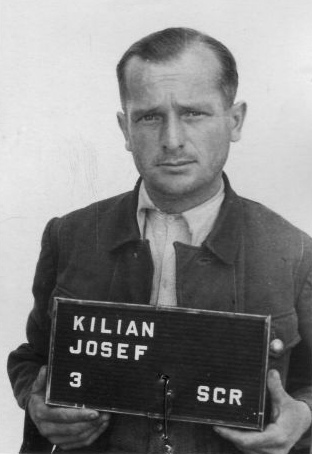
Josef Kilian, kapo and defendant in the Dora trial

A small number of kapos were prosecuted in East and West Germany. In a well-publicised 1968 case, two Auschwitz kapos were put on trial in Frankfurt. They were indicted for 189 murders and multiple assaults, found guilty of several murders, and sentenced to life imprisonment.

=== In Israel ===
The Nazis and Nazi Collaborators (Punishment) Law of the State of Israel, passed in 1950, most famously used to prosecute Adolf Eichmann in 1961 and Ivan Demjanjuk in 1986, was originally introduced with the principal aim of prosecuting Jewish people who collaborated with the Nazis. Between 1951 and 1964, approximately 40 trials were held, mostly of people alleged to have been kapos.

Fifteen trials are known to have resulted in convictions, but scant details are available since the records were sealed in 1995 for a period of 70 years from the trial date. One person – Yehezkel Jungster – was convicted of crimes against humanity, which carried a mandatory death penalty, but the sentence was commuted to two years in prison. Jungster was pardoned in 1952, but died a few days after his release.

According to teacher and researcher Dan Porat, the way in which former kapos were officially viewed – and tried – by the state of Israel went through four distinct phases. Initially viewed as co-perpetrators of Nazi atrocities, they eventually came to be perceived as victims themselves. During the first stage described by Porat (August 1950 – January 1952), those alleged to have served or to have collaborated with the Nazis were placed on an equal footing with their captors, with some measure of leniency appearing only in the sentencing phase for some cases. It was during this phase that Jungster was sentenced to death; six other former kapos were each sentenced to an average of almost five years in prison.

Jungster’s death sentence had not been anticipated by either the legislators nor the prosecutors, according to Porat, and triggered a number of amendments to pre-trial charges in order to remove any indictment that would potentially carry a mandatory death sentence. During this second phase (February 1952 – 1957), the Israeli Supreme Court overturned Jungster’s sentence and essentially ruled that while Nazis could be charged with crimes against humanity and war crimes, their former collaborators could not.

While prosecutions of kapos continued, doubts emerged amongst some of those in the public sphere as to whether the trials should continue at all. The official view remained that kapos had been Jewish collaborators, not Nazis themselves. By 1958, when the third phase began, lasting until 1962, the legal system had begun to view kapos as having committed wrongs but with good intentions. Thus, only those whom prosecutors believed had aligned themselves with the Nazis' aims were brought to trial. There were calls from some survivors that the trials should end, though other survivors still demanded that justice be served.

The fourth phase (1963 – 1972) was marked by the trial of Adolf Eichmann, one of the principal architects of the Final Solution, and of Hirsch Barenblat two years later. Kapos and collaborators were now seen by the courts as ordinary victims, a complete reversal from the initial official perspective. Eichmann’s prosecutor was very clear in drawing a line between the Jewish collaborators and camp functionaries, and the Nazis. Barenblat’s trial in 1963 drove this point home. Barenblat, conductor of the Israel National Opera, was tried for having turned Jews over to the Nazis as head of the Jewish Ghetto Police in the Bendzin ghetto in Poland.

Having arrived in Israel in 1958–9, Barenblat was arrested after a ghetto survivor recognised him while he was conducting an opera. Found guilty of helping the Nazis by ensuring that Jews selected for the death camps did not escape, Barenblat was sentenced to five years in prison. On 1 May 1964, after having served three months, Barenblat was freed and Israel’s Supreme Court quashed his conviction. The acquittal may have been due to the court’s aim of putting an end to the trials against kapos and other alleged Nazi collaborators.

== Significance and legacy ==
German historian Karin Orth wrote that there was hardly a measure so perfidious as the SS attempt to delegate the implementation of terror and violence to the victims themselves. Eugen Kogon, an avowed opponent of Nazism from prewar Germany and a Buchenwald concentration camp survivor, wrote after the war that the concentration camp system owed its stability in no small way to the cadre of kapos, who took over the daily operations of the camp and relieved SS personnel. The absolute power was ubiquitous. The system of discipline and supervision would have promptly disintegrated, according to Kogon, without the delegation of power. The rivalry over supervisory and warehouse functionary jobs was, for the SS, an opportunity to pit prisoners against each other. Regular prisoners were at the mercy of a dual authority: the SS, who often hardly seemed to be at the camp, and the prisoner kapos, who were always there.

=== As a Jewish slur ===
The term kapo has been used as a slur in the twenty-first century, particularly for Jews deemed insufficiently supportive of Israel or Zionism. In 2017, David Friedman, soon to become US ambassador to Israel, apologized for referring to supporters of the J Street advocacy group as "far worse than kapos".

While there is a popular perception that all Kapos were Jews, this is not so. Kapos were of various nationalities found in the concentration camps.

== Depictions in media ==
- Kapo, a 1960 film directed by Gillo Pontecorvo.
- Escape from Sobibor, a 1987 television movie which features a kapo helping prisoners escape from Sobibór extermination camp.
- The Counterfeiters, a film which features several kapos, in various camps.

== See also ==
- Belsen Trial, the Trial of Joseph Kramer and 44 others (former kapos, convicted in late 1945 for war crimes).
- Bitch Wars in the Soviet Gulag system.
- Divide and rule
- Eliezer Gruenbaum, notable kapo
- Jewish Ghetto Police
- Judenrat - Jewish councils under Nazi administration for self-government in Ghettos and other Jewish communities in occupied territories.
- Line management
- Plantations in the American South § Overseer
- Sonderkommando
- Triangulation (psychology)
- Trusty system (prison)
