= Yesh Din =

Israeli human rights organization

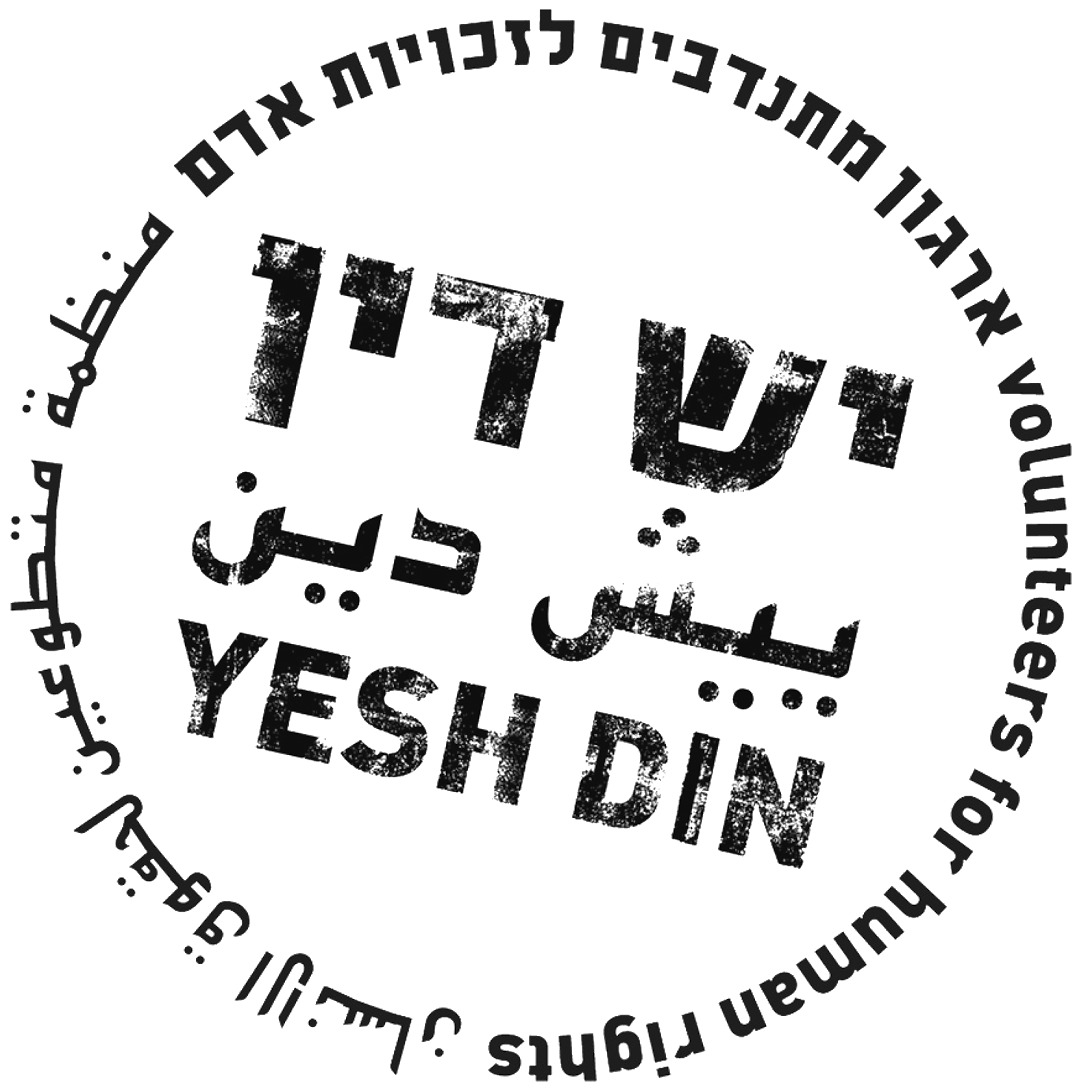
- Founded: 2005; 21 years ago
- Type: Non-profit; NGO
- Purpose: "[T]he extent of Israel's implementation of its duty to protect the Palestinian civilians under its armed forces' occupation"
- Location: Tel-Aviv, Israel
- Region served: West Bank, Palestine
- Method: Reporting human rights abuses, legal actions, direct advocacy with the authorities and working with the media to encourage debate
- Website: www.yesh-din.org

Yesh Din (Hebrew: יש דין, lit. 'There Is Law'; transcribed into Arabic: ييش دين), full name Yesh Din: Volunteers for Human Rights, (Note: Hebrew: יש דין – ארגון מתנדבים לזכויות אדם, romanized: Yesh Din – Irgún Mitnadvím LiZkhuyót Adám; Arabic: ييش دين – منظمة متطوعين لحقوق الإنسان, romanized: Yīsh Dīn – Munaẓẓamat Mutaṭawwiʿīn li-Huqūq al-ʾInsān.) is an Israeli organization working in Israel and in the West Bank. The organization was founded in 2005 by a group of women who previously worked with the organization Machsom Watch. The purpose of Yesh Din, as reflected in its publications, is to work "for structural, long-term improvement to human rights in the Occupied Palestinian Territories (OPT)".

The organization's name "reflects the belief that equitable application of local and international law is an important component in upholding human rights".

Yesh Din collects and disseminates information regarding violations of Palestinians' human rights in the West Bank; applies public and legal pressure on Israeli authorities; and raises public awareness regarding these issues.

== Activities ==
The organization conducts three main projects:

=== Israeli citizens ===
The first project applies to law enforcement regarding Israeli citizens suspected of harming Palestinians. According to the organization, volunteers collect testimonies from Palestinians who claim that they have been injured or that their property has been damaged by Israeli citizens, and, if the need arises, accompany them to police stations to file a complaint.

The organization's legal advisor, Attorney Michael Sfard, and lawyers from his office follow the investigations, examine the investigation files in cases which didn't lead to indictment and sometimes file petitions. According to its records, up until September 2015, the organization followed more than 1,000 investigation files. The organization publishes reports and periodical data sheets documenting law enforcement regarding Israeli citizens who commit what the organization defines as "ideologically motivated offences" against Palestinians. According to Yesh Din, 85% of investigation files in these cases are closed due to police failure and only 7.5 lead to indictments.

=== Israeli security personnel ===
A second project deals with the accountability of Israeli security forces personnel suspected of committing offences against Palestinians in the West Bank. The organization represents Palestinians who filed complaints against soldiers and police officers and follows the investigations of the Israeli Military Police Criminal Investigations Division (MPCID) and the Department of Police Investigations (DPI).

The organization works legally and publicly to improve the conduct of law enforcement authorities in the West Bank. The organization petitioned the Supreme Court of Israel (High Court of Justice, HCJ) demanding the release of protocols/transcripts of military courts, where its volunteers observed the proceedings. Following the petition, the state attorney announced that the organization will be given a "general review permit" for the military courts' files.

In 2015 the organization published a report entitled "Standing Idly By", dealing with the conduct of IDF soldiers during incidents in which they witness violence against Palestinians committed by Israeli citizens in the West Bank. The organization claims that IDF did not formulate clear instructions and procedures on how soldiers should act in such incidents.

=== Illegal Israeli construction ===
Yesh Din monitors illegal construction conducted on privately owned Palestinian land and the expansion of Israeli settlements on public land. The organization wishes to "enforce systemic changes in Israeli authorities who oversee planning and law enforcement". The organization filed several petitions to the HCJ which led, among other things, to the evacuation of Ulpana hill in Beit El and to the decision to evacuate the Amona illegal Israeli outpost.

Yesh Din planned to use a classified Israeli government database to prove that many West Bank Israeli settlements were built on land privately owned by Palestinian citizens without compensation.

== Staff ==
The organization's Executive Director is Attorney Ziv Stahl, survivor of the Kfar Aza massacre. The organization's activity is based on the work of a professional team of legal counsels, field researchers and research staff, alongside volunteers who collect the information and check its reliability.

A public council works alongside the organization, with the following members: Prof Orna Ben-Naftali (founder of The Émile Zola Chair for Human Rights); former Attorney General of Israel; Michael Ben Yair; former Knesset member, Prof Naomi Chazan; accountant and journalist Dan Bavly; co-founder and President Emeritus of the Jerusalem Foundation, Ruth Cheshin; playwright Joshua Sobol; Prof Uzy Smilansky; Colonel (Ret.) Paul Kedar (former Israeli consul general in New York City); Attorney Yehudit Karp (former Deputy Attorney General of Israel); industrialist Yair Rotlevy; historian Zeev Sternhell; journalist Akiva Eldar; and sculptor and Israel Prize laureate Dani Karavan.

An official with a senior role in the organization from 2008 to 2016 was field researcher Muhannad Anati. Anati was previously a member of a terror group and was convicted of killing an Israeli informant and of other crimes. He had served 9 years in Israeli prison for these crimes.

== Funding ==
Yesh Din is a not-for-profit organization. In order to maintain its independence, the organization does not accept direct or indirect donations from Israeli or Palestinian government bodies. In 2007, the organization received donations in the sum of 1,895,078 NIS; in 2008 it was 3,125,875 NIS; and in 2009 it was 4,361,947 NIS.

Donations were received from the European Union, governments of Norway, Netherlands, Ireland, Germany, United Kingdom and various foundation such as: NDC, Oxfam, the Open Society Foundations of George Soros, The Naomi and Nehemia Cohen Foundation and the New Israel Fund.

== Criticism ==
The organization was accused by the Israeli right-wing of working to promote the Palestinian narrative in the Israeli–Palestinian conflict under the guise of concern for human rights; and that its work and the terminology it applies are being used as instruments by organizations which work to de-legitimize the state of Israel around the world.

In December 2010, the daily newspaper Israel Hayom published Yesh Din's documents listing its missions for the years 2011–2012, among them "inserting the issue of war crimes" into legal, public and media discourse.

IDF spokesperson commented on a report published by Yesh Din and claimed it suffers from various flaws resulting from partial examination of the data, problematic research methods, insufficient familiarity with the legal system in the West Bank and avoiding a comparison to similar legal systems in the Western world. Following the criticism and public protest against the organization, IDF and Israel Police decided to cancel their participation in the conference held by the organization in May 2015.
