= Lords of the Land =

2006 book by Idith Zertal and Akiva Eldar

- Author: Idith Zertal, Akiva Eldar
- Translator: Vivian Sohn Eden
- Genre: History
- Publisher: PublicAffairs
- Publication date: September 28, 2007
- ISBN: 9781568583709

Lords of the Land: The War for Israel's Settlements in the Occupied Territories, 1967–2007 by Idith Zertal and Akiva Eldar (ISBN 1-5685-8370-2) is a book explaining how Israel changed the demographic formula at the occupied territories through building more settlements on the lands of the occupied territories and forcing Palestinians to move away. It was first published in Hebrew by Dvir publishing house, Israel, 2005 as אדוני הארץ : המתנחלים ומדינת ישראל,? 1967–2004 / Adone ha-arets : ha-mitnaḥalim u-medinat Yiśraʼel?, 1967–2004.

It was translated into English by Vivian Eden, and published by The Nation Books, and reviewed in the New York Review of Books, the New York Times, and the London Review of Books.
