= Hirsch Barenblat =

Holocaust survivor and Ghetto policeman (born 1914)

Henryk Barenblat Hirsz Hanoch Barenblat
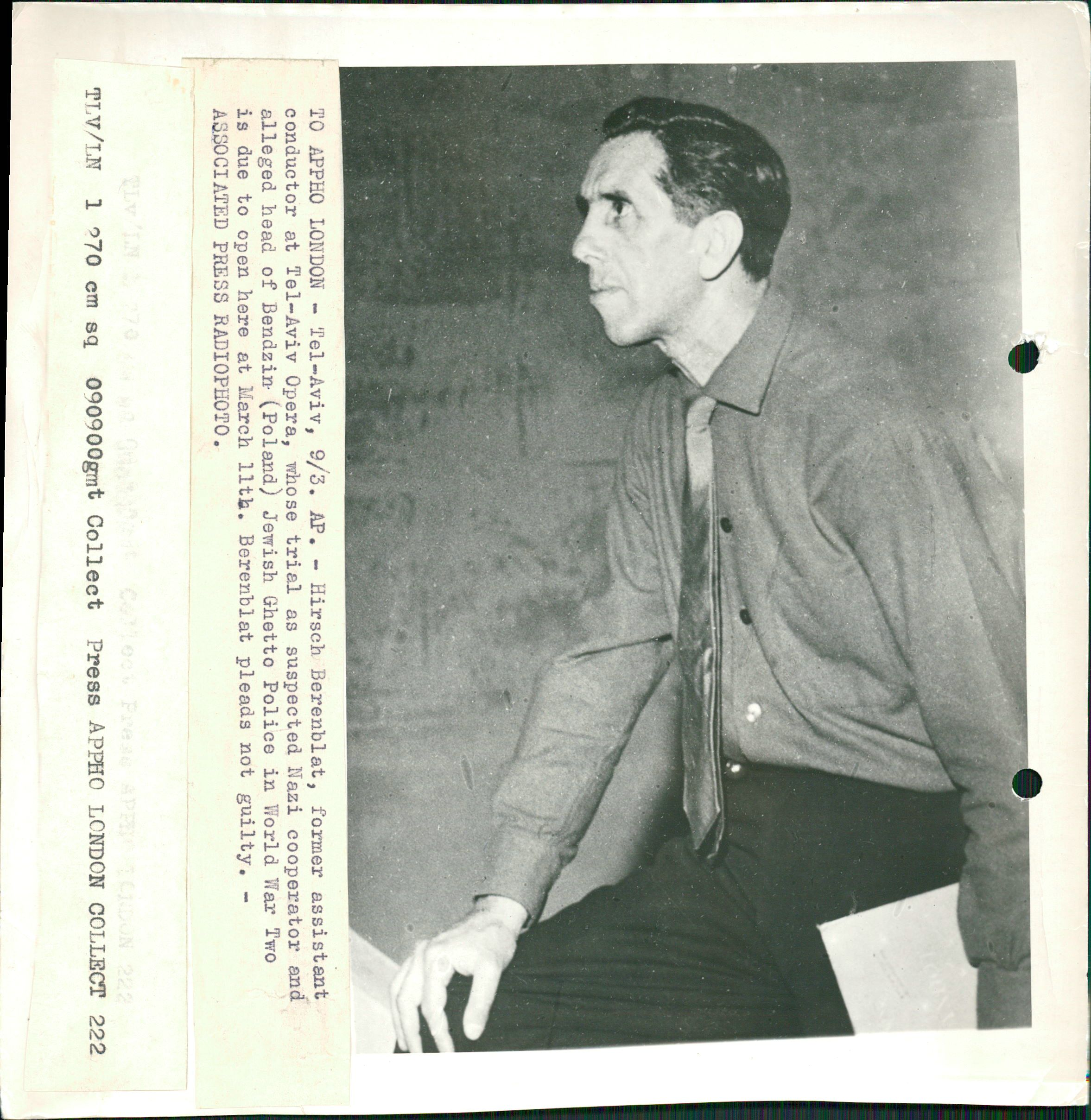

Background information
- Born: December 28, 1914; Będzin, Congress Poland
- Genres: Classical, opera, operetta
- Occupations: Conductor, composer
- Instrument: Piano
- Years active: 1940s–1960s

Henryk Hirsz Hanoch Barenblat (born 1914, Będzin, date of death unknown) was a Polish-born Israeli musician and conductor, known for his role as head of the Jewish Ghetto Police in the Będzin Ghetto and subsequent legal cases in Poland and Israel which ended with his acquittal by the Israeli Supreme Court in 1964, on the grounds of insufficient evidence. He'd served three months of a five-year sentence.

He studied piano at the Silesian Music Conservatory in Katowice. In 1953–1956 he was a tutor and conductor at the State Operetta in Gliwice. He also worked in a theater in Ostrava. He then settled in Israel and was the conductor of the Israeli National Opera.

In 1955 he was decorated Medal of the 10th Anniversary of People's Poland.

In 1960 he moved to Germany where he worked as a theater conductor in Cologne.

== See also ==
- Kapo

== Sources ==
- Avihu Ronen, Hadas Agmon & Asaf Danziger (2011) "Collaborator or Would-Be Rescuer? The Barenblat Trial and the Image of a Judenrat Member in 1960s Israel" Yad Vashem Studies
- Porat, Dan (2019). "Absolving Ordinary Functionaries". Bitter Reckoning: Israel Tries Holocaust Survivors as Nazi Collaborators. Harvard University Press. pp. 187–212. ISBN 978-0-674-24313-2.
