= Salameh Nematt =

Jordanian journalist

Salameh Nematt (Arabic: سلامه نعمات; born 1962) is a Jordanian journalist and analyst with over 25 years of experience in economic and political reporting, research and analysis of developments in the broader Middle East, Europe and the United States. He has worked extensively on Arab-Israeli political, economic, security and human rights issues, and has done in-depth reporting on conflicts throughout the Middle East, the Gulf, and North Africa.

== Career ==
As Washington Bureau Chief for Al Hayat, the International Arab daily (2003–2007), and as international editor and contributor for The Daily Beast (2008–2010), Nematt's work focused on reporting on, and analyzing, U.S. foreign policy, including issues related to the War in Iraq, the global war on terrorism, the U.S. drive for democratization in the broader Middle East, as well as issues related to U.S. military and security strategies in the region. He also writes extensively on regional and global energy issues and their economic and political implications. Nematt is currently setting up "Pillar Seven," a Middle East regional communications consultancy to be based in Amman, Jordan.

Prior to his work in Washington, D.C., Nematt served in London for two years (2001–2003) as Managing Editor for Al Hayat–LBC, a partnership between the two news organizations. Responsibilities included recruiting staff, designing and implementing the editorial plan and strategy for the news integration venture between the newspaper and the Pan-Arab satellite channel.

His previous positions included Amman Bureau Chief for Al Hayat, International diplomatic correspondent in London for Al Hayat, Amman Bureau Chief and regional correspondent for the BBC Arabic Service radio, and Chief economic correspondent, and later chief political correspondent for the English-language daily Jordan Times and Al-Ra'i Arabic daily.

=== Contributions ===
He contributes to numerous Arabic, English- and other foreign language publications including The Economist, Al-Quds, The Middle East, Jane's Defence Weekly, Mideast Mirror, Die Zeit, Newsweek, BBC World Service (English), UPI and Oxford Analytica, as well as international broadcast media such as ITV News, Fox News, CNN, ABC news, PBS, MSNBC, CBC, Al-Jazeera, Al-Arabiya and others. In 1994–1995, Nematt worked as regional correspondent for the BBC Arabic Service TV, in addition to his work as Bureau Chief for Al-Hayat and Correspondent for BBC Arabic Service radio. He reported on and analyzed developments related to the Iran-Iraq war, the 1990-1991 Iraq invasion of Kuwait, the Second Gulf War, and the Arab-Israeli peace process.

=== Honors ===
Nematt was selected by the World Economic Forum’s organizing committee as a member of the Media Working Group, commissioned to plan a strategy for reforming the Arab media by 2010. He is winner of many journalistic prizes, including the 1985 Alfred Friendly Press Award and of the 2007 Eliav-Sartawi Award from Search for Common Ground for his collaboration with Israeli journalist Akiva Eldar.

=== Speaker ===
Nematt is a frequent commentator on Arab and international political and economic affairs for U.S., Arab and European news organizations and a regular speaker at a variety of forums in the U.S., the Arab world and Europe. He has lectured on Arab media, economics and politics at numerous universities including Oxford University, Johns Hopkins University, Brown University, Tufts University, George Mason University, Georgetown University, University of Virginia, American University, and Boston College.
