= Search for Common Ground =

International nonprofit organization

- Abbreviation: Search
- Formation: 1982
- Founder: John Marks
- Type: International non-governmental organization
- Headquarters: Washington, D.C., United States, and Brussels, Belgium
- CEO: Shamil Idriss
- Website: www.sfcg.org

Search for Common Ground (or Search) is an international non-governmental organization that works to end violent conflict and build healthy, safe, and just societies. It is the largest such organization dedicated to peacebuilding, with offices in over 30 countries and a media reach of roughly 40 million people.

Since its founding in 1982, Search for Common Ground has helped to avert genocide in Burundi, supported post-civil war elections in Liberia and Sierra Leone, shaped gender norms in Nepal with a TV show reaching 25 percent of the population, and mainstreamed sexual assault training for soldiers in the Democratic Republic of the Congo. In 2018, Search was nominated for the Nobel Peace Prize.

== History ==
Search was founded at the height of the Cold War by John Marks, a former diplomat at the United States Department of State. The first major project was fostering cooperation between the United States and the Soviet Union to address violence in Lebanon. With Search's support, a task force proposed a multilateral, regional peace process that led to the end of the Israeli-Jordanian war.

Since 1982, Search for Common Ground has expanded work to over 30 countries and 1,000 staff. Search opened its first office in the Middle East in 1991, Europe in 1994, Africa in 1995, and Asia in 2002.

== The Common Ground Approach ==
The Common Ground Approach is the core methodology that Search for Common Ground uses, developed over nearly four decades of frontline experience. The essence of the Approach is to bring people together across divides, understand the needs lurking beneath surface labels, identify shared problems, and solve those problems. Trust grows over time, and change lasts when embedded in markets, norms, and institutions.

== Work ==
Search's mission is “to transform the way the world deals with conflict, away from adversarial approaches and toward cooperative solutions.” Tactics include dialogue training, joint development projects, public art projects, sports leagues, and social impact entertainment via radio, TV, film, and print. Each year, over 300,000 people attend Search events, while projects directly engage roughly 2,000 religious leaders, 2,500 security officials, 1,500 political leaders, and 2,000 media professionals.

=== Community Memorialization Project (Sri Lanka) ===
In the late 2000s, many Sri Lankans faced painful losses after a 26-year civil war. Search for Common Ground created an archive of stories from people on all sides of the violence, including handwritten letters, audio recordings, and children's drawings. The archive led to a touring exhibit that visited over 400 locations and a media campaign that reached two million people.

=== Inuka! (Kenya) ===
Inuka! was a program designed to support young people, counter violent extremism, and build resilient communities in Kenya, where violent extremism posed a dire threat. Issues came to a head in Lamu County in 2011, when a surge of al-Shabaab members posing as fishermen led the local government to ban nighttime fishing. Search for Common Ground facilitated discussions to manage tensions and devise a solution: digital ID cards that enabled nighttime fishing to return after seven years of hardship.

=== The President (Jerusalem) and I am the President (Tunisia) ===
In 2013, Search for Common Ground partnered with the Ma’an Network to create The President, a political reality TV show that promoted the democratic engagement of Palestinian youth. The first season aired in Jerusalem, with viewers voting via text message the winner. After two seasons, The President spun off into I am the President, a Tunisian equivalent that launched in 2019 with an audience over one million viewers.

=== Security Sector Reform (Democratic Republic of the Congo) ===
In the 2000s, a senior United Nations official referred to the Democratic Republic of the Congo as “the rape capital of the world,” with 54 percent of human rights abuses committed by the military and police. For 20 years, Search for Common Ground has worked with staff drawn from diverse ethnicities to change this dynamic. Search consulted with the military to create mandatory training for new recruits, reaching soldiers across the country.

=== Singha Durbar (Nepal) ===
Singha Durbar (“The Lion’s Palace”) was a 13-episode drama that debuted in Nepal in 2015. The show tells the story of Aasha Singh, the fictional first female prime minister of Nepal, played by Nepali star Gauri Malla. Over 25 percent of the Nepali population watched the show, which showcased female leadership, positive gender roles, and democratic values.

=== Studio Ijambo (Burundi) ===
In 1994, the genocide against tusti left over 1 million of people dead and raised fears that violence would spread to neighboring Burundi. Search for Common Ground created Studio Ijambo as an independent radio station staffed by a mix of Hutus and Tutsis and promoting reconciliation through news programs and soap operas. In 2016, Secretary of State John Kerry credited Search with averting genocide in the country.

=== Talking Drum Studios (Liberia and Sierra Leone) ===
Violent conflict plagued Liberia and Sierra Leone in the 1990s and early 2000s, with children often used as soldiers. In the aftermath, Search for Common Ground established Talking Drum Studios to foster healing, democracy, and peace. An especially popular program was Golden Kids News, which trained children as journalists. One participant was Michael Sambola, who became a famous investigative journalist and produced Gud Mornin Salone, the most popular radio program in Sierra Leone.

=== The Team ===
The Team (also known in French as L'Équipe) is an international multi-ethnic and multicultural television series produced by Search for Common Ground. It is a flagship television program by SFCG, used as an education tool through a dramatization of various young players associated to each other through their common love of association football (soccer).

The common thread between all the series is promote, through the common love of the game of football (soccer), the importance of education, commitment, cooperation (teamwork), diversity, gender equality, overcoming of adversity and conflict resolution and bridging of differences between people of various ethnic, religious, economic and societal backgrounds by bringing them together.

Using the popularity of football (called soccer in America), the show uses sports as a metaphor to unification while addressing local, deep-rooted conflict. The show follows specific characters on a football team who must learn to work together to overcome their differences and win the game. The show is specifically tailored to the country in which it airs. Each country has different issues it faces, and the scripts represent these differences. The cast, writers and production crews are, whenever possible, all indigenous to the country. In the DRC, The Team deals specifically with women's rights.

Part of the success of The Team is that the audience can relate to the characters. The characters portrayed on the soap opera are from varied ethnic, religious, educational and economic backgrounds.

The Team aired in a dozen countries in Asia, Africa and the Middle East, notably Ivory Coast, Kenya, Morocco and had already aired as a radio program in Ethiopia. Second seasons were in production in three countries. According to the Boston Globe, nearly 25% of Moroccans watch the locally produced episodes of The Team.

In 2007, Kenya experienced post-election violence. In response to this violence, SFCG, in partnership with the Nairobi Peace Initiative, Media Focus on Africa, the UK's Department for International Development and the US Agency for International Development, launched The Team: Kenya The show follows players from the Imani F.C. team. Imani translates as Faith in the local language. The players are from all different parts of Kenyan society- rich and poor, educated and uneducated, urban and rural and male and female. The players have to work together to win games, and through working together, they overcome their differences. The show originally broadcast in May, 2009. A third season is currently in production.

== Structure ==
Search for Common Ground is headquartered in Washington, D.C., and Brussels, Belgium, although over 90 percent of staff are based in other country offices. Search offices reflect the social divides that they seek to bridge, with staff recruited across ethnic, racial, and political lines and 89 percent of staff working in their home country.

John Marks led Search from 1982 to 2014, when Shamil Idriss became president and CEO. Search's budget and portfolio has expanded steadily across decades, with net assets at $90.5 million in 2020. The organization has received funding from over 65 foundations and non-profit organizations, 14 governments, and 15 multilateral institutions.

== Eliav-Sartawi Awards for Middle East Journalism ==
During the early 2000, Search for Common Ground awarded the Eliav-Sartawi Awards for Middle East Journalism. An award which was initiated by the American Jewish journalist and peace activist Jesse Zel Lurie; in order to promote better understanding and to foster ongoing political dialogue toward peace in the Middle East. The award is named after peace activists Aryeh Eliav and Issam Sartawi. Amongst the recipients of the award were: Gershon Baskin, Rami George Khouri, Aziz Abu Sarah, Bradley Burston Yaron London Salameh Nematt and Akiva Eldar.

== See also ==
- Conflict resolution
- Cost of conflict
- Justice Call
