= Akiva Eldar =

Israeli journalist (born 1945)

- עקיבא אלדר
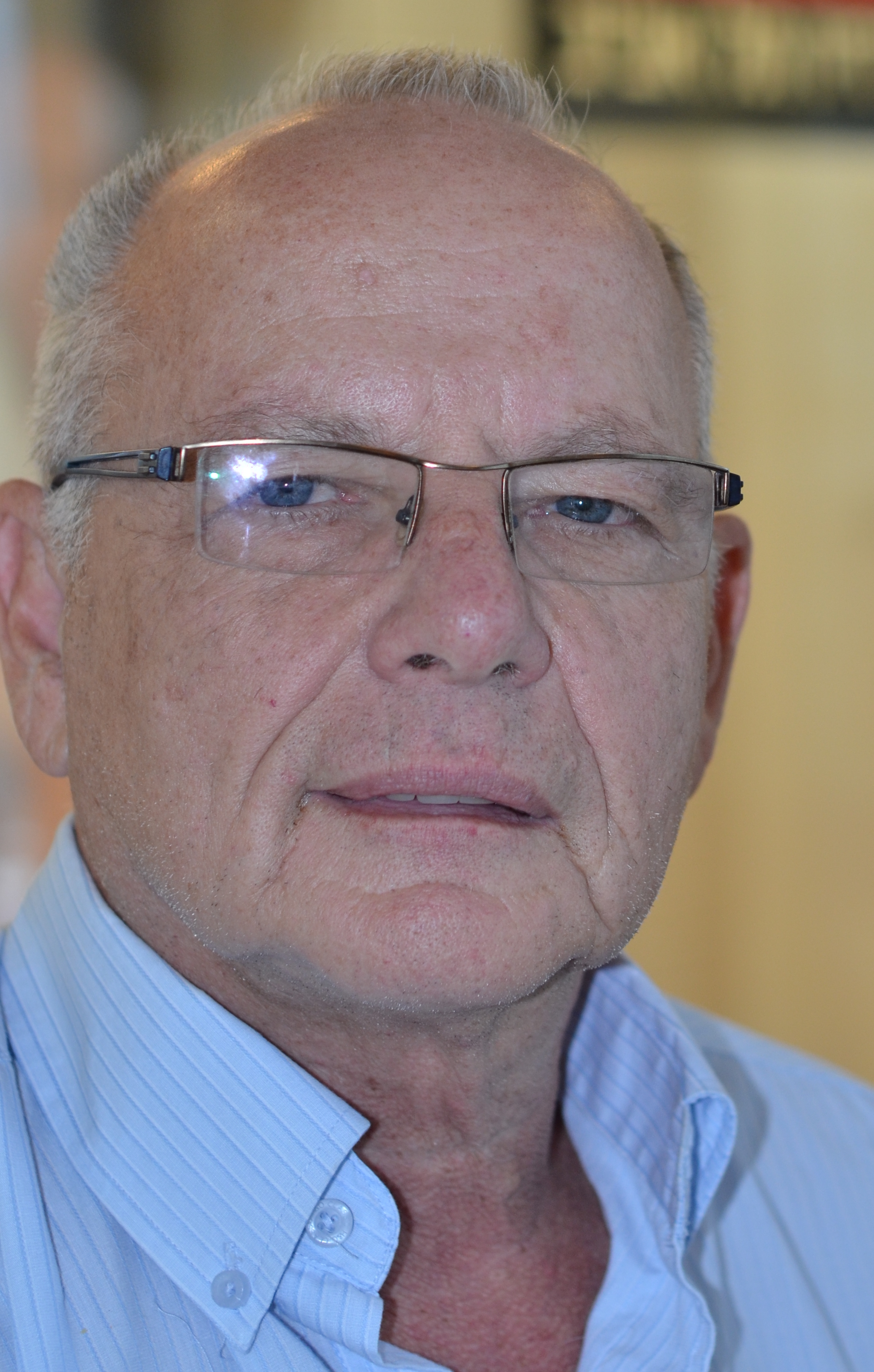
- Portrait of Akiva Eldar
- Born: 27 November 1945 (age 80)
- Education: Hebrew University of Jerusalem
- Occupations: Political analyst, journalist, author
- Known for: Columns for Haaretz, political analysis
- Notable work: Lords of the Land: The War Over Israel's Settlements in the Occupied Territories, 1967–2007
- Awards: Eliav-Sartawi Award for Middle Eastern Journalism (2007); Peace through Media Award (2010)

Akiva Eldar (Hebrew: עקיבא אלדר; born 27 November 1945) is an Israeli political analyst, author and journalist. Eldar wrote for the newspaper Haaretz and was chief political columnist, editorial writer and US Bureau Chief for the paper, where he worked for 35 years. His final column in English for the paper appeared on 13 November 2012. He also wrote columns for the Japanese daily Mainichi Shimbun, lectured in communications at Tel Aviv University's School of Journalism and worked as a consultant for PBS television.

== Education ==
Akiva Eldar graduated from the Hebrew University of Jerusalem, where he majored in economics, political science and psychology.

== Journalism career ==
He served as spokesperson for the former mayor of Jerusalem, Teddy Kollek. He was a reporter and editor at the Kol Yisrael. Eldar began working for Haaretz in 1978. In 1983–1993, he was the diplomatic correspondent for Haaretz. In 1993–1996, he served as Haaretz United States Bureau Chief and Washington, D.C., correspondent, covering the Israeli–Palestinian peace process, Israel–United States relations, American issues and Israel–diaspora relations. He was a special consultant to Abba Eban's PBS television documentaries on the history of Israel and the Oslo Accords. From 2012 to 2020 he was the political analyst for Al-Monitor.com. Since then he is a permanent contributor to Haaretz and frequently interviewed by global TV news shows.

== Views and opinions ==
Eldar was described by Nahum Barnea as one of several journalists, along with Gideon Levy and Amira Hass, who do not "pass the lynch test" and "who could not bring themselves to criticize the Arabs even when two Israelis were savagely murdered by a mob in Ramallah". Barnea called their support for the Palestinian position "absolute".

Eldar responded that he was honored to be mentioned along with his fine journalist colleagues Levy and Hass, and wrote, "I admit to being guilty as charged. I am a journalist with a mission, and also no small amount of passion. Every Israeli with a conscience, in particular one who watches reality from up close on a daily basis, cannot write about the occupation from an objective observer's neutral point of view." In a response op-ed, Calev Ben-David wrote that if Eldar is not empathetic to Israelis' concerns, he will do little "to advance the Palestinian cause, as he merely preaches to the converted and makes his own conscience feel cleaner in the process".

== Published works ==
Akiva Eldar is the co-author of the biography of Shimon Peres; he is also the coauthor (with professor Idith Zertal) of the book Lords of the Land: The War Over Israel's Settlements in the Occupied Territories, 1967–2007 (Nation Books, 2007) ISBN 1-56858-370-2.

== Awards ==
In October 2007, Eldar won the annual Eliav-Sartawi award for Middle Eastern journalism, awarded by Search for Common Ground, an international conflict transformation organization, sharing it with Jordanian journalist Salameh Nematt.

In 2010, Akiva won a Peace through Media Award at the sixth annual International Media Awards hosted by the International Council for Press and Broadcasting in London.

== Car crash ==
In May 2015, Eldar was seriously injured in Sydney, Australia when he was struck by a car driven by singer Jon Stevens.
