= Orna Ben-Naftali =

Israeli academic

- ארנה בן-נפתלי
- Education: Tel Aviv University (LL.B.); Harvard University (M.A., History of International Relations); Fletcher School of Law and Diplomacy, Tufts University (PhD), (M.A. in Law and Diplomacy)
- Scientific career
- Fields: Public International Law, (Humanitarian Law; IHRL; ICL); Law and Culture
- Workplaces: College of Management Academic Studies (The COLLMAN), Israel

Orna Ben-Naftali (Hebrew: ארנה בן-נפתלי) is the rector of the College of Management Academic Studies and the Emile Zola Chair for Human Rights. She has previously served as dean of the Striks School of Law, College of Management Academic Studies.

== Academic career ==
Ben-Naftali is a graduate of the Tel Aviv University Law faculty (LL.B.), Harvard University (M.A. History) and the Fletcher School of Law and Diplomacy (M.A.L.D.; Ph.D).

She has been a research fellow at the Max Planck Institute for Comparative Public Law and International Law, Heidelberg; The Law Department of the European University Institute, Florence; and the Institute for Advanced Studies, Hebrew University of Jerusalem; and a visiting professor at The European Academy of The European University Institute, Brandeis University, and The Fletcher School of Law and Diplomacy.

She formerly served on the editorial board of the European Journal of International Law, and currently serves on the editorial boards of Humanity Journal and The Max Planck Trialogues on War and Peace. She is also a member of the board of ICON-S-IL.

She has founded the e-journal "Hamishpat on line: Human Rights" and serves as its chief editor.

She was the founding director of the Law and Culture and the International Law Divisions at the Striks School of Law, and the Dean of the Striks School of Law. She is the Emile Zola Chair for Human Rights and the Founding Director of the Takkanah LL.M. program in Human Rights at the Striks School of Law. Since 2017 she serves as the Rector of the College of Management Academic Studies.

== Professional career ==
Between 1990-1993 Prof. Ben-Naftali was Deputy Director General for Academic Affairs at the College of Management Academic Studies. Between 1993-1996 she worked at the Department of Peacekeeping Operations, the United Nations HQ/NY.

== Public activities ==
Prof. Ben-Naftali is the chairwoman of the Sapir Prize for Literature, She previously served as the chairwoman of the Public Council of "Yesh Din: Volunteers for Human Rights" and as a board member of "B'Tselem".

== Publications (select) ==
=== Books ===
- Ben-Naftali, Orna; Sfard, Michael; Viterbo, Hedi (2018). The ABC of the OPT: A Legal Lexicon of the Israeli Control over the Occupied Palestinian Territory. Cambridge: Cambridge University Press. doi:10.1017/9781316661376. ISBN 978-1-107-15652-4.
- International Law Between War and Peace (with Yuval Shany) (Tel Aviv: Ramot Pub. Tel-Aviv University, Hebrew, 2006)

=== Edited books and special journal issues ===
- Law in the Domains of Culture, special issue of HaMishpat Law Journal (Hebrew, 2002)
- Israel and the Globalization of International Criminal Law, special issue of Hamishpat Law Journal (with Yuval Shany) (Hebrew, 2003)
- Trials of Love (with Hannah Naveh), (Ramot Pub., Hebrew, 2005)
- International Human Rights and Humanitarian Law: Collected Courses of the Academy of European Law (Oxford University Press 2011).

=== Selected refereed journals and articles or chapters in scientific books ===
- Missing in Legal Action: Lebanese Hostages in Israel, 41 Harvard International Law Journal 185 (2000) (with Sean Gleichgevitsch)
- Justice-Ability: A Critique of the Non-Justiciability of The Israeli Policy of Targeted Killing, 1 Journal of International Criminal Justice 368 (2003) (with Keren Michaeli)
- ‘Do Not Make a Scarecrow of the Law’: A Legal Analysis of the Israeli Policy of Targeted Killings, Cornell International Law Journal, Vol. 36 (2003) (with Keren Michaeli)
- Living in Denial: The Co-application of Humanitarian Law and Human Rights Law to the Occupied Territories, Israel Law Review, 17 (2003-2004) (with Yuval Shany)
- Illegal Occupation: The Framing of the Occupied Palestinian Territory, Berkeley Journal of International Law, Vol. 23 (2005) (with Aeyal Gross & Keren Michaeli) (rep. in The Palestine Question in International law (V. Kattan ed., The British Institute for International and Comparative Law (2008); a version in Hebrew was published in 31 Theory and Criticism (2007)
- A Judgment in the Shadow of International Criminal Law: The Decision of the Israeli High Court of Justice on the Legality of Targeted Killings, 5 Journal of International Criminal Justice 322 (2007)
- The Public Committee against Torture in Israel v. The Government of Israel, 101 American Journal of International Law 459 (case note, 2007) (with Keren Michaeli)
- What the International Court of Justice did not say about the duty to punish Genocide in the Bosnia and Herzegovina v. Serbia Case: The Missing Pieces in a Puzzle, Journal of International Criminal Justice, Vol. 5, no.4 (2007) (with Miri Sharon)
- The Duty to Prevent and the Duty to Punish Genocide, in Genocide in the XXI Century – A Commentary to the Genocide Convention (P. Gaeta, ed., Oxford University Press, 2009)
- PathoLAWgical Occupation: the Exceptional Case of the Israeli control of the OPT and Other Legal Pathologies, in International Human Rights and Humanitarian Law (Oxford University Press 2011)
- How Much Secrecy Does Warfare Need in Transparency in International Law (Andrea Bianchi & Anne Peters eds. Cambridge University Press, 2013) (with Roy Peled)
- The Astro-Nomos: On International Legal Paradigms and the Legal Status of the West Bank, 14 (3) Washington University Global Studies Law Review, 399 (2015) (with Rafi Reznik)
