= Idith Zertal =

Israeli historian

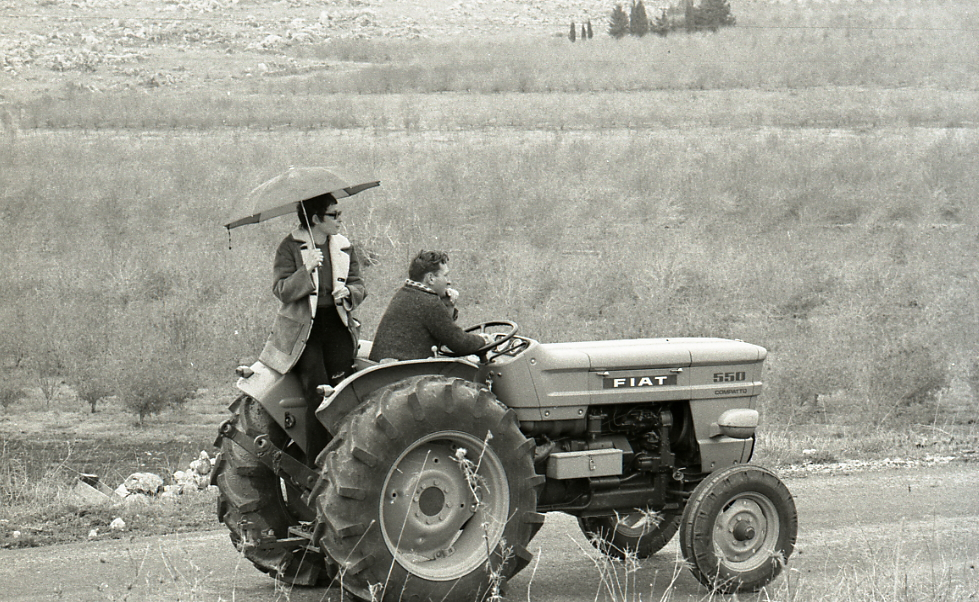
Image of Idith Zertal

Idith Zertal (Hebrew: עידית זרטל; born 1945) is an Israeli historian, considered one of the "New Historians".

== Career ==
After a career in journalism, Zertal began a career as a professor of history and cultural anthropology at the Hebrew University of Jerusalem. She has been a visiting professor at several universities, including the University of Chicago and the School for Advanced Studies in the Social Sciences in Paris.

Zertal is considered one of the New Historians. In From Catastrophe to Power, she examined Zionist immigration policy after the end of World War II for survivors of Nazi extermination camps, and in particular the divergence of interests between the Jewish community in Palestine and the survivors. According to her, while Zionist organizations acted in the interests of the victims of the Final Solution, there was also a political instrumentalization of this suffering in order to fight the immigration quotas imposed by Great Britain. Zertal highlights another fault line: that between the Jewish diaspora and the Jews of Palestine, the latter of whom, according to her, were filled with remorse for not having done enough to save the Jews of Europe.

In Israel's Holocaust and the Politics of Nationhood, she questions the place of the Holocaust in the discourse and politics of Israel. In particular, she accuses the Jewish state of instantiating the Holocaust to justify "the abuses of the Palestinians".

She also wrote a book critical of the occupation of the Palestinian territories, Lords of the Land, together with Akiva Eldar.

== Political activism ==
Zertal is a member of the Israeli political party Meretz and ranked 86th on the party's list for the 2013 legislative election.

A critic of politics in Israel, Zertal has spoken out in favor of the refusenik movement that refuses to serve in the Occupied Palestinian Territories, in favor of a boycott of Israeli companies active in the West Bank, and against the recognition of anti-Semitism in anti-Zionism.

== Bibliography ==
- From Catastrophe to Power: The Holocaust Survivors and the Emergence of Israel, Berkeley, University of California Press, 1998, ISBN 0520215788
- Israel's Holocaust and the Politics of Nationhood, Cambridge, Cambridge University Press, 2005, ISBN 0521850967
- Lords of the Land: The War Over Israel's Settlements in the Occupied Territories, 1967-2007, with Akiva Eldar, New York, Nation Books, 2007, ISBN 1568583702
