= Michael Bazyler =

American professor of law

Michael Bazyler (born 1952) is an American professor of law and 1939 Society Law Scholar in Holocaust and Human Rights Studies at Chapman University. He previously taught at Whittier Law School. His book Holocaust Justice: The Battle for Restitution in America’s Courts was cited by the United States Supreme Court while Holocaust, Genocide, and the Law was a 2016 Jewish Book Council winner.

== Works ==
- Bazyler, Michael J. (2005). Holocaust Justice: The Battle for Restitution in America's Courts. NYU Press. ISBN 978-0-8147-2938-0.
- Bazyler, Michael J.; Tuerkheimer, Frank M. (2015). Forgotten Trials of the Holocaust. NYU Press. ISBN 978-1-4798-9924-1.
- Bazyler, Michael J. (2016). Holocaust, Genocide, and the Law: A Quest for Justice in a Post-Holocaust World. Oxford University Press. ISBN 978-0-19-539569-3.
- Bazyler, Michael J.; Boyd, Kathryn Lee; Nelson, Kristen L.; Shah, Rajika L. (2019). Searching for Justice after the Holocaust: Fulfilling the Terezin Declaration and Immovable Property Restitution. Oxford University Press. ISBN 978-0-19-092306-8.
