= Robert Servatius =

German lawyer during war crimes trials

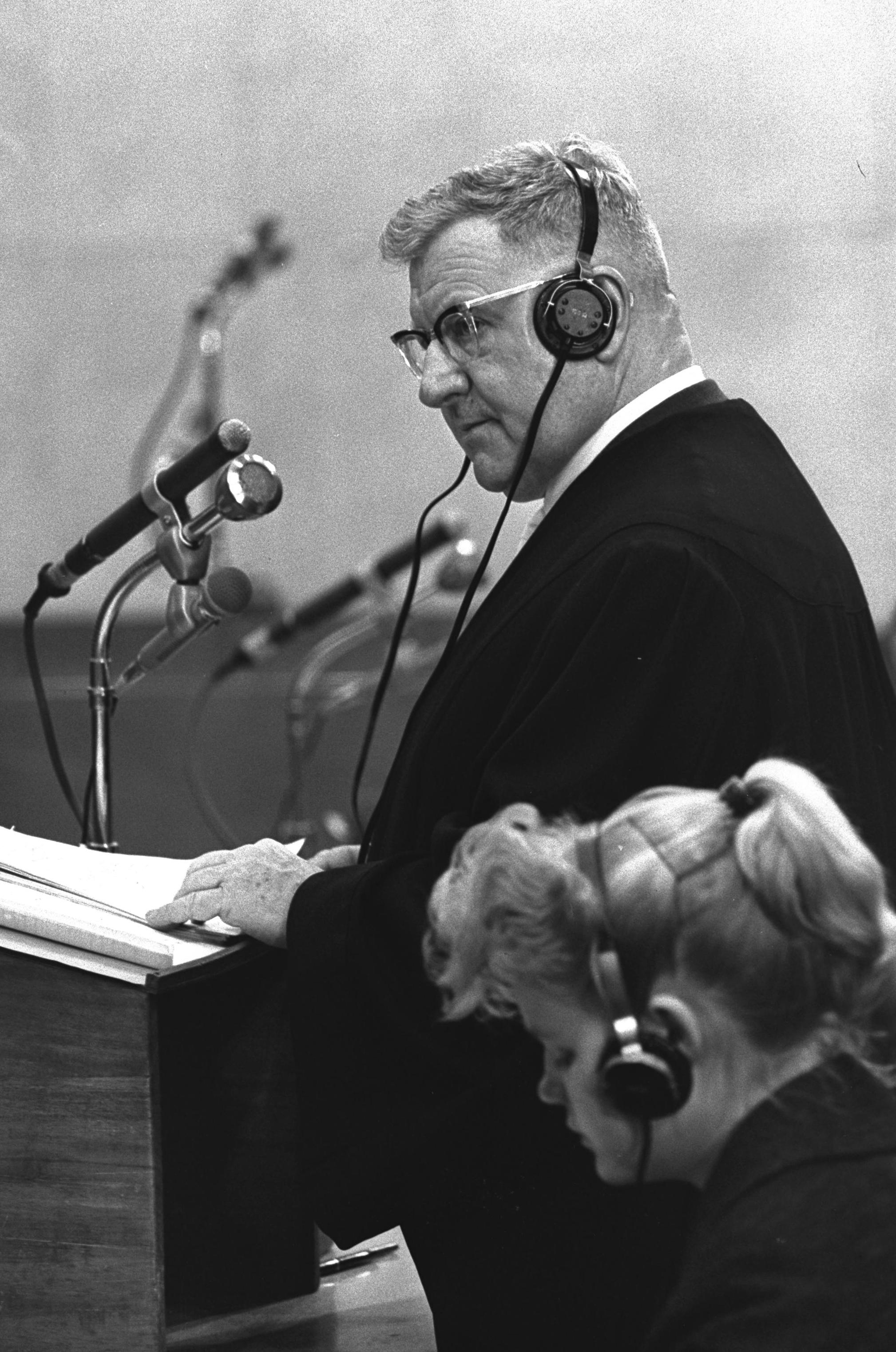
- Servatius at the 1961 Eichmann trial in Israel, where he defended Adolf Eichmann.
- Born: October 31, 1894; Cologne, Prussia, Germany
- Died: August 7, 1983 (aged 88); Cologne, West Germany
- Occupation: Criminal defense lawyer
- Military career
- Allegiance: Germany
- Branch: Imperial German Army; Wehrmacht
- Rank: Major
- Conflicts: World War I World War II

Robert Servatius (31 October 1894 – 7 August 1983) was a German lawyer, prominent in his profession in Cologne, and especially known for his judicial defenses of Nazi war criminals, including Adolf Eichmann.

== Early life and education ==
Servatius was born in Cologne on 31 October 1894 to a family of industrialists and farmers. He graduated from the Friedrich-Wilhelm high school, and served as an artillery officer in World War I.

From 1918 to 1922, he studied law at Marburg University, the Ludwig-Maximilians-Universität München, the Humboldt University of Berlin, and the University of Bonn. He completed a legal clerkship, passed the staatsexamen in law, and received a doctorate of law from the University of Bonn in 1925.

== Career ==
He then worked as a lawyer in Cologne, specializing in tax and business law. During World War II, he returned to military service as an officer, rising to the rank of major. He was never a member of the Nazi Party, and was never connected with any of its crimes. He served as a criminal defense lawyer at the Nuremberg trials. Notable defendants he represented at Nuremberg included Fritz Sauckel, Karl Brandt, and Paul Pleiger.

=== Eichmann trial ===
Servatius represented Adolf Eichmann at his trial in Israel in 1961. A number of lawyers had offered to represent him, and Eichmann's family chose Servatius, who had offered to represent Eichmann in a telephone call to Eichmann's stepbrother.

Israeli law had to be changed to enable this, as until that time foreign lawyers had no right of audience in Israeli courts. The change enabled only those facing a capital charge to be represented by a non-Israeli lawyer.

Before he was appointed to defend Eichmann, Mossad investigated the history of Servatius, and found nothing which greatly troubled the investigators, e.g., they showed that Servatius had never been a member of the Nazi Party, which would have disqualified him.

Although he had been hired by Eichmann, it emerged that Eichmann would not be able to pay Servatius's fee. As a result, Servatius was paid by the Israeli government, following a precedent set at Nuremberg.

He was assisted in the defense of Eichmann by Dieter Wechtenbruch. Servatius arrived in Israel in October 1960, where he met with his client and began preparing a defense strategy. Following Eichmann's conviction and death sentence, Servatius handled his unsuccessful appeal to the Supreme Court and attempted to gain clemency for Eichmann from the Israeli president, Yitzhak Ben-Zvi.

Following Eichmann's execution, Servatius returned to West Germany, and made no comments to the media about the propriety and legality of the trial. Servatius died in Cologne in 1983 at the age of 88.
