= Dan Porat =

Israeli historian and author

Dan Porat (Hebrew: דן פורת) is an Israeli historian and author who works for the Hebrew University of Jerusalem.

== Works ==
- Porat, Dan (2019). Bitter Reckoning: Israel Tries Holocaust Survivors as Nazi Collaborators. Harvard University Press. ISBN 978-0-674-24313-2.
- Porat, Dan (2010). The Boy: A Holocaust Story. Farrar, Straus and Giroux. ISBN 978-0-8090-3072-9.
