= Eichmann (disambiguation) =

Adolf Eichmann (1906–1962) was a German Nazi leader and Holocaust perpetrator.

Eichmann may also refer to:

- Eichmann (film), a 2007 film

== People with the surname ==
- Eric Eichmann (born 1965), American soccer player
- Léo Eichmann (born 1936), Swiss football (soccer) goalkeeper
- Ricardo Eichmann (born 1955), German archeologist and son of Adolf Eichmann
- Bernd Eichmann (born 1966), retired German football player

== See also ==
- Eichmann in Jerusalem, a 1963 book
- Eichmann Interrogated, a 1983 book
- United States v. Eichman, a 1990 United States Supreme Court case that invalidated a federal law against flag desecration
