= Eichmann (film) =

2007 film by Robert Young

- Theatrical release poster
- Directed by: Robert Young
- Written by: Snoo Wilson
- Starring: Thomas Kretschmann; Troy Garity; Stephen Fry
- Cinematography: Michael Connor
- Edited by: Saska Simpson
- Music by: Richard Harvey
- Production companies: Regent Releasing; Here! Films
- Distributed by: Regent Releasing
- Release date: September 2007 (Brazil)
- Running time: 100 minutes
- Country: United Kingdom
- Language: English
- Box office: $2,706

Eichmann is a biographical film detailing the interrogation of Adolf Eichmann. Directed by Robert Young, the film stars Thomas Kretschmann as Eichmann and Troy Garity as Eichmann's Israeli interrogator, Avner Less. It was first released in Brazil in September 2007, and was released in the United States in October 2010.

== Plot ==
The film is based on manuscripts of the interrogations of Adolf Eichmann (Thomas Kretschmann) before he was tried and hanged in a prison in Israel. Eichmann recounts events from his past to an Israeli detective, Chief inspector Avner Less (Troy Garity), who is faced with the immense task of tricking the skilled manipulator into self-incrimination. While the world waits, Less's countrymen call for immediate execution, forcing him and Eichmann to confront each other in a battle of wills.

== Cast ==
- Thomas Kretschmann as Adolf Eichmann
- Troy Garity as Chief inspector Avner Less
- Franka Potente as Vera Less
- Stephen Fry as Minister Tormer
- Delaine Yates as Miriam Fröhlich
- Tereza Srbova as Baroness Ingrid von Ihama
- Judit Viktor as Ann Marie
- Stephen Greif as Hans Lipmann

== See also ==
- Eichmann in Jerusalem
- Eichmann Interrogated
