= Fritz Bauer =

German judge (1903–1968)

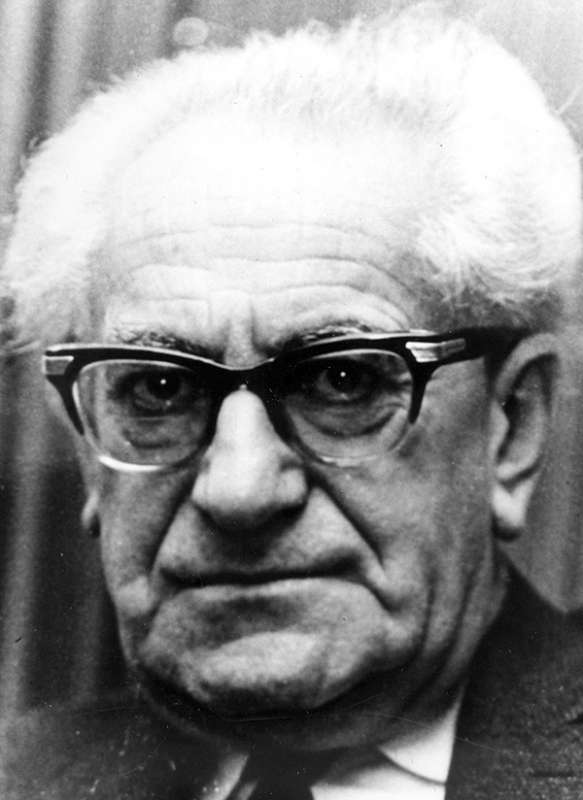

Personal details
- Born: 16 July 1903 Stuttgart, Kingdom of Württemberg, German Empire
- Died: 1 July 1968 (aged 64) Frankfurt am Main, Hesse, West Germany
- Party: Social Democratic Party

Fritz Bauer (16 July 1903 – 1 July 1968) was a German Jewish judge and prosecutor. He played an instrumental role in the post-war capture of former Holocaust planner Adolf Eichmann, and in bringing about the Frankfurt Auschwitz trials.

== Early life and education ==
Bauer was born in Stuttgart, to a Jewish German family. His parents were Ella (Hirsch) and Ludwig Bauer. Bauer's father was a successful businessman who ran a textile mill that provided him with an annual income of 40,000 ℛ︁ℳ︁ by 1930 (for comparison, the annual income of a typical doctor in Germany in 1930 was 12,500 ℛ︁ℳ︁). His sister Margot called their childhood a "liberally Jewish one". Though his family had assimilated into the German culture, his parents did not celebrate Christmas as a secular holiday – a common practice in Jewish homes in Stuttgart at the time – but insisted on celebrating Jewish holidays.

Bauer attended Eberhard-Ludwigs-Gymnasium in Stuttgart, and studied business and law at Heidelberg University, the Ludwig-Maximilians-Universität München, and the University of Tübingen. German universities were traditionally strongholds of the völkisch movement, and almost all student fraternities in Germany under völkisch influence refused to accept Jews as members. Accordingly, Bauer found himself joining the liberal Jewish fraternity FWV (Freie Wissenschaftliche Vereinigung – Free Academic Union) in Heidelberg, to which he devoted much of his time.

== Career in the Weimar Republic ==
In 1928, after receiving his PhD in law (at 25, Doktor der Rechte [Jur.Dr.] in Germany), Bauer became an assessor judge in the Stuttgart local district court. By 1920, he already had joined the Social Democratic Party (SPD). Bauer found himself feeling at home in Stuttgart, a city with a left-wing working class majority that had a reputation as a "progressive" city where Weimar culture flourished. The city council of Stuttgart was dominated by the Social Democrats, while the Nazis won only 1.1% of the vote in the Stuttgart municipal election of 1928. Bauer was the only judge in Württemberg who was a member of the SPD, and one of only two Jewish judges in Württemberg. As such, he was very much an outsider in the Württemberg judiciary. Bauer recalled later about the other judges in Württemberg: "They came from the highly elitist student fraternities and members of the reserve officers' corps. Their entire outlook was conservative and authoritarian in spirit. The Kaiser had gone, but the generals, public officials and judges remained".

Bauer found himself appalled by the way that the other judges in Württemberg flagrantly favored the Nazis, always imposing the most lenient sentences on Nazis who engaged in violence and the harshest possible sentences on Communists and Social Democrats who did the same. He believed that this favoritism towards the Nazis encouraged their violence. Bauer felt the political biases of the judiciary—who had an unwritten rule under the Weimar republic that violence committed by the right was acceptable—was the "judicial overture" to their actions under the Nazi regime. Bauer remembered that the judges of Württemberg almost down to a man loathed the Weimar Republic, which they believed was born of the stab-in-the-back myth of 1918 committed by "godless and unpatriotic scoundrels. The judges weren't at all fond of the republic and they used the guise of judicial independence to sabotage the new state".

In the early 1930s, Bauer was together with Kurt Schumacher, one of the leaders of the SPD's Reichsbanner defense league in Stuttgart. Bauer served as the chairman of the Stuttgart chapter of the Reichsbanner and from 1931 onward found himself engaged in a feud with Dietrich von Jagow, the SA leader for Southwestern Germany. In late 1931, Bauer was demoted from a judge handling criminal cases to a judge handling civil cases following accusations from the Nazi journalist Adolf Gerlach in the local Stuttgart Nazi newspaper NS-Kurier that Bauer was biased because he was a Jew and a Social Democrat who discussed details of the trial with a journalist from the Social Democratic newspaper Tagwacht. At the hearing in response to Gerlach's complaint, Bauer argued the details of the case involving a local con-man on trial for cheating others of their money had already been discussed in court, so he had not violated any rules by speaking to a journalist and the case was not political. At the hearing, the judges ruled that Bauer had failed to "comply with existing regulations", thereby implying that Gerlach's accusations were partly justified and only declined to dismiss him because it could not be proved that Bauer's actions were "politically motivated".

Following the demotion, Bauer contacted Kurt Schumacher, a decorated World War One veteran, who had lost his arm and who served as the editor of the Social Democratic newspaper Schwäbische Tagwacht, about the need to drum up an anti-Nazi movement. Schumacher told Bauer: "We don't need intellectuals. Workers don't like intellectuals". Finally, Schumacher agreed to send Bauer to speak at a SPD rally, where Bauer gave what he called "a talk which went down rather well, I must admit". Bauer had a "deep, roaring voice" that electrified audiences and even a hostile Nazi account admitted he had "an accessible and very appealing style of expression". Schumacher in turn was, despite his atypical appearance owing to his war wounds, one of the most popular Social Democrats in Württemberg, as one lawyer recalled: "He was like Churchill, chain-smoking cigarettes and puffing on cigars. You could sense his resolve and unwavering belief in the absolute righteousness of his cause". Schumacher and Bauer travelled across Württemberg giving speeches as Bauer recalled: "He and I spoke every weekend, sometimes three, four or five times. We were urging people to defend the Weimar Constitution, but also combat the extremism of the Weimar era". The rallies usually ended with people shouting Frei-Heil! (Hail Freedom!) which was intended to mock the Nazi slogan Sieg Heil! (Hail Victory!).

As Schumacher was also a Social Democratic member of the Reichstag (federal parliament), he had to spend much time in Berlin attending the sessions of the Reichstag, causing him to resign as a chairman of the Stuttgart chapter of the Reichsbanner in favor of Bauer. After the Harzburg Front was founded in October 1931, Bauer was one of the driving forces behind the creation of the Iron Front, whose stated purpose was to defend democracy.

== Imprisonment in Nazi Germany ==
On 8 March 1933, Jagow was appointed police commissioner for Württemberg. On 23 March 1933, while Bauer was at work in his office, a group of policemen arrived to arrest him without charges. In March 1933, soon after the Nazi seizure of power, a plan to organize a general strike against the Nazis in the Stuttgart region failed, and Schumacher and Bauer were arrested with others and taken to Heuberg concentration camp. Bauer was tormented by the SA guards at Heuberg who found various ways to humiliate him and often beat him. As a "third-class" prisoner (i.e. one considered especially dangerous to the German state), Bauer was singled out for abuse such as being forced to stand for hours facing a wall while SA men struck him in the knees with their nightsticks and banged his head against the wall.

Other than mentioning that he was forced to clean the camp's latrine on a daily basis, Bauer never spoke about his own experiences at Heuberg, which were too painful for him. The man who Bauer consistently praised in his recollections of Heuberg was Schumacher, who, despite missing one of his arms and being in constant pain from his war wounds, was unyielding in his principles, taking abuse from the guards without complaint. The more prominent and older Schumacher, who had been an outspoken opponent of the Nazis as an SPD deputy in the Reichstag, remained in concentration camps (which destroyed his health) until the end of World War II, whereas the young and largely unknown Bauer was released.

In November 1933, Bauer was transferred from Heuberg to a newly founded prison, Oberer Kuhberg concentration camp, located in former Army barracks in Ulm, where the guards were professional policemen instead of the SA, and conditions were better. In 1933, it was possible for lesser political prisoners to be released if they signed a public declaration of loyalty to the Nazi regime. On 13 November 1933, a letter appeared in the Ulmer Tagblatt newspaper from eight imprisoned Social Democrats proclaiming their loyalty to the new regime, which led to their release. One of the signatories was Bauer, who felt so humiliated that he never allowed discussion of this chapter of his life. In accordance with the Law for the Restoration of the Professional Civil Service he was removed from office.

Schumacher was also offered release if he signed such a declaration, which he refused, saying that he rather would stay in the concentration camps forever than betray his beliefs. Much of the praise that Bauer was later to offer Schumacher as a man who was always true to himself seems to have reflected feelings of guilt about his own actions in signing the declaration.

== Exile ==
In 1936, Bauer emigrated to Denmark.

While in Denmark, Bauer, after the deportation of his relatives, managed to get in contact with the Danish minister of justice, Steincke, to plead with him to get a visa for his parents so that they could leave Germany and come to Denmark. Steincke, not thinking the situation was so dire, changed his mind after Bauer requested that his parents be given a visa to Greenland. Steincke, realizing the severity of the situation anyone would be in to want to go there, as it was a cold and inhospitable place, granted the Bauers a visa to come to Denmark. The Bauers arrived in Denmark on 1 January 1940.

Shortly after, Bauer was arrested by the Danish police on charges of having sex with a male prostitute. Homosexuality was legal in Denmark, but soliciting the services of a prostitute of the same sex was not. Bauer admitted to the police that he did have sex with the prostitute in question, but denied vehemently that he paid the man for sex. After the German occupation, the Danish authorities revoked his residence permit in April 1940 and interned him in a camp for three months. On 1 December 1941, Bauer's first cousin, Erich Hirsch, and his aunt, Paula Hirsch, both of whom had remained in Stuttgart, were arrested by the Stuttgart police and were placed on a train together with 1,013 Stuttgart Jews. The train went to Riga, where all of the Jews were taken out to a field outside of Riga and shot by Latvian collaborationists. In October 1943, as Nazis began the deportation of Danish Jews to Theresienstadt concentration camp, he went underground. If Bauer was homosexual, that would have placed him in even further peril should he remain in Germany or Nazi-occupied Denmark. To protect himself, he formally married the Danish kindergarten teacher Anna Maria Petersen, in June 1943. Although some authors, such as biographer Ronen Steinke, argue that Bauer was probably homosexual, others consider this unproven.

In October 1943, he fled to Sweden after the Danish government resigned and the Nazis declared martial law, which endangered the Jewish population in Denmark. Bauer spent 8 days in hiding in a cellar and on the night of 13 October 1943 left Denmark in a Danish fishing boat that took him, his parents, sister, brother in law, and two nephews to Sweden. Living for a time in Gothenburg before departing to Stockholm where Bauer founded, along with Willy Brandt and others, the periodical Sozialistische Tribüne (Socialist Tribune).

Learning to speak Swedish (albeit with a strong German accent) Bauer supported himself by teaching law students at Stockholm university and archival work. In his spare time he wrote books, ranging in topics from economics to Napoleon.

In 1945 his father, Ludwig, died from leukemia while living in Sävedalen.

== Return to Germany ==
Bauer returned to Germany in 1949, as the postwar Federal Republic (West Germany) was being established, and once more entered the civil service in the justice system. At first he became director of the district courts, and later the equivalent of a U.S. district attorney, in Braunschweig. His mother, Ella Bauer, died in 1955.

In 1956, he was appointed the Generalstaatsanwalt (state prosecutor) in Hessen, based in Frankfurt. Bauer held this position until his death in 1968.

In 1957, thanks to Lothar Hermann, a former Nazi camps prisoner, Bauer relayed information about the whereabouts in Argentina of fugitive Holocaust planner Adolf Eichmann to Israeli Intelligence, the Mossad. Hermann's daughter Sylvia began dating a man named Klaus Eichmann in 1956 who boasted about his father's Nazi exploits, and Hermann alerted Fritz Bauer, at the time prosecutor-general of the Land of Hesse in West Germany. Hermann then tasked his daughter with investigating her new friend's family; she met with Eichmann himself at his house, who said that he was Klaus's uncle. Klaus arrived not long after, however, and addressed Eichmann as "Father".

In 1957, Bauer passed the information to Mossad director Isser Harel, who assigned operatives to undertake surveillance, but no concrete evidence was initially found. Bauer trusted neither Germany's police nor the country's legal system, as he feared that if he had informed them, they would likely have tipped off Eichmann. Thus he decided to turn directly to Israeli authorities. Moreover, when Bauer called on the German government in order to make efforts to get Eichmann extradited from Argentina, the German government immediately responded negatively.

In 2021, it became known that much more instrumental to the capture of Eichmann was the geologist Gerhard Klammer, who had worked with Eichmann in the early 1950s in a construction company in the Argentine Tucumán province, who provided Bauer with Eichmann's exact address and a photograph of Eichmann alongside Klammer. Klammer was in contact with the German priest Giselher Pohl and bishop Hermann Kunst, to whom he sent the information with the photograph, from which Klammer's face was ripped. Kunst, in turn, passed the evidences to Bauer. Bauer's sources remained secret, and along with Klammer's recomposed picture were not revealed before 2021.

Mossad's Isser Harel acknowledged the important role Fritz Bauer played in Eichmann's capture, and claimed that he pressed insistently for the Israeli authorities to organize an operation to apprehend and deport him to Israel. Shlomo J. Shpiro, in the introduction to Harel's book The House on Garibaldi Street, stated that Bauer did not act alone but was discreetly helped by Hesse minister-president Georg-August Zinn.

Bauer was active in the postwar efforts to obtain justice and compensation for victims of the Nazi regime. In 1958, he succeeded in getting a class action lawsuit certified, consolidating numerous individual claims in the Frankfurt Auschwitz trials, which opened in 1963. As Gary J. Bass writes, "Bauer made a point of prosecuting not just senior camp leaders but also lower-ranked Germans, since every person operating the death camp contributed to mass murder."

Bauer also pressed for replacing the 1935 version of Paragraph 175 of the German penal code, which stipulated that the mere "expression of homosexuality" was illegal. It meant that for gay people even to come out of the closet and declare their sexuality was a criminal offense. In West Germany, the 1935 version of Paragraph 175 stayed in effect until 1969, making the lives of gay people almost unbearable. Perhaps reflecting concerns about drawing attention to his own sexuality, Bauer did not demand the abolition of Paragraph 175, but instead suggested reverting to the 1871 version of the paragraph that labeled homosexual sex a criminal offense.

In 1968, working with German journalist Gerhard Szczesny, Bauer founded the Humanist Union, a human rights organization. After Bauer's death, the Union donated money to endow the Fritz Bauer Prize. Another organization, the Fritz Bauer Institute, founded in 1995, is a nonprofit organization dedicated to civil rights that focuses on history and the effects of the Holocaust.

Fritz Bauer's work contributed to the creation of an independent, democratic justice system in West Germany, as well as to the prosecution of Nazi war criminals and the reform of the criminal law and penal systems. Within the postwar German justice system, Bauer was a controversial figure due to his political engagements. He once said, "In the justice system, I live as I were in exile."

== Death ==
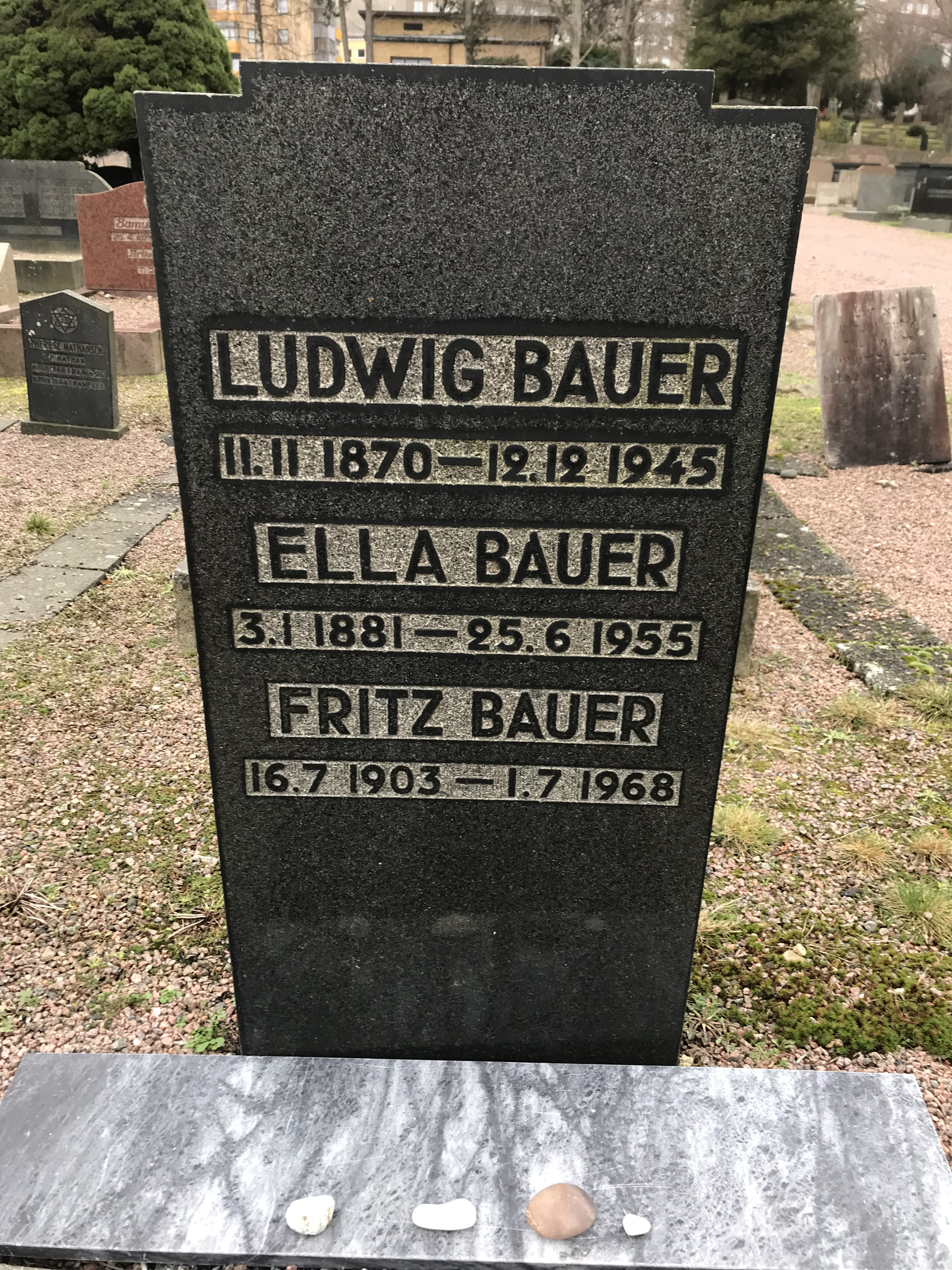
Grave of Fritz Bauer and his parents in a Jewish cemetery in Gothenburg, Sweden

Bauer died in 1968 in Frankfurt am Main, aged 64. He was found having drowned in his bathtub. A post-mortem examination stated he had consumed alcohol and taken sleeping pills.

After a wake by his friends on the 6th of July, his body was cremated and the ashes taken to Sweden and interred in his parents' grave in Örgryte Old Cemetery.

== Works ==
- Die Kriegsverbrecher vor Gericht ("War Criminals in Court"), with a postscript by Hans Felix Pfenninger. Neue Internationale Bibliothek, Europa, Zürich 1945.
- Das Verbrechen und die Gesellschaft ("Crime and Society"). Ernst Reinhardt, Munich 1957.
- Sexualität und Verbrechen. Beiträge zur Strafrechtsreform ("Sexuality and Crime"). Fischer, Frankfurt 1963.
- Die neue Gewalt. Die Notwendigkeit der Einführung eines Kontrollorgans in der Bundesrepublik Deutschland ("The new Oppression"). Verlag der Zeitschrift Ruf und Echo, Munich 1964.
- Widerstand gegen die Staatsgewalt. Dokumente der Jahrtausende ("Resistance to State Oppression"). Fischer, Frankfurt 1965.
- Die Humanität der Rechtsordnung. Ausgewählte Schriften ("The Human Values of Legal Process; Selected Documents"). Joachim Perels and Irmtrud Wojak, Campus Verlag, Frankfurt/New York 1998, ISBN 3-593-35841-7.

== Biographies ==
- Irmtrud Wojak: Fritz Bauer. Eine Biographie, 1903–1968, Munich: C.H. Beck, 2009, ISBN 3-406-58154-4.
- Ronen Steinke: Fritz Bauer: oder Auschwitz vor Gericht, Piper, 2013, ISBN 978-3492055901, translated into English as:
  - Steinke, Ronen (2020). Fritz Bauer The Jewish Prosecutor Who Brought Eichmann and Auschwitz to Trial. Bloominton: Indiana University Press. ISBN 978-0253046895.
- Jack Fairweather: The Prosecutor: One Man's Battle to Bring Nazis to Justice, New York: Crown, 2025, ISBN 978-0593238943.

Further reading: Bernhard Valentinitsch, "Der Staat gegen Fritz Bauer". In: Journal for Intelligence, Propaganda and Security Studies(=JIPSS). Vol. 10 (Graz 2016), pp. 236–237.

== See also ==
- The People vs. Fritz Bauer, a 2015 German film
- Labyrinth of Lies, a 2014 German film
