= Lothar Hermann =

German Jew and concentration camp survivor

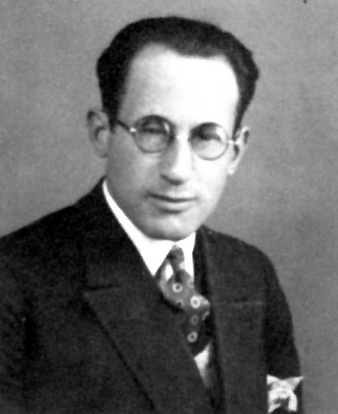
- Lothar Hermann, 1935
- Born: November 11, 1901; Quirnbach Westerwald, German Empire
- Died: July 6, 1974 (aged 72); Argentina
- Occupation: pension adviser
- Known for: Contributing to the identification and capture of Adolf Eichmann
- Spouse: Marta Waldmann
- Children: Silvia Hermann

Lothar Hermann (November 11, 1901 – July 6, 1974) was a German Jew and concentration camp survivor who contributed to the identification and arrest of Adolf Eichmann, one of the major organizers of the Holocaust.

== Early life and exile ==
Hermann was born in 1901 as the third son of the cattle trader Max Hermann and his wife Sophie in the small town of Quirnbach in the Westerwald. Some of his eleven siblings died early. After school, he completed a commercial apprenticeship in Wittlich at the Jewish textile house Stutz and then worked in a collection office.

From his apprenticeship onwards he was possibly a member of the KPD (German Communist Party). He and his brother Ludwig are said to have regularly smuggled foreign currency from Germany to France to support Jews in Palestine. He attracted the attention of the police on several occasions. In 1935 he was caught red-handed with 90 Reichsmarks in a foreign currency smuggling operation to France, arrested by the Gestapo and imprisoned in the Dachau concentration camp on suspicion of espionage. There he was severely maltreated and lost the sight of one eye as a result of beatings.

After his release from the concentration camp, Hermann left Germany for the Netherlands in August 1936. There he met his non-Jewish later wife, Marta Waldmann. In December 1938 he emigrated with his wife via Rotterdam to Montevideo (Uruguay) and then moved on to Argentina. In May 1941, his daughter Silvia was born, who was not brought up in the Jewish faith. During the Nazi era, his entire family was murdered, with the exception of his brother Hugo and three other relatives.

== Exposure of Adolf Eichmann ==
After the end of the Second World War, Hermann lived as a stateless Jew in Olivos in the metropolitan area of Buenos Aires. As a pension advisor, he helped German-Jewish immigrants in asserting their claims for reparations. During the Nazi dictatorship, Argentina had become the third most important country of exile for European Jews. During Juan Perón's presidency, however, a growing number of fugitive perpetrators of the Nazi regime arrived in Argentina, who had nothing to fear under Perón until his overthrow in 1955. In the years that followed, Argentina showed little interest in prosecuting and extraditing the Nazi German criminals.

In 1954, Hermann's daughter Silvia, then 12 years old, happened to meet Adolf Eichmann's eldest son Klaus, who was 17 years old at the time, in the York district cinema. There exist multiple versions of events that led Silvia and then Lothar Hermann to suspect that Klaus was the son of Adolf Eichmann, a prominent Nazi official and one of the main organizers of the Holocaust.

As early as 1954, Hermann passed on his suspicions first to the Jewish community in Buenos Aires and then to the Delegación de Asociaciones Israelitas Argentinas (DAIA), the Jewish political umbrella organization in Argentina, but they did not react. Hermann then passed on his information to Fritz Bauer and also to Tuviah Friedman, who was trying to investigate Nazi criminals from Israel but was massively hindered by the Israeli authorities in further contact with Hermann. Fritz Bauer, who at the time was working in Hesse, Germany, as General Prosecutor, in turn, passed this information on to the Israeli foreign secret service Mossad in 1957 by secret means.

Two fact-finding missions by Mossad in 1957 and 1958 led the secret service to doubt the information, citing that Lothar Hermann had moved outside of Buenos Aires and in the meantime had developed cataracts in his other eye and was almost blind. It was only after more pressure by Fritz Bauer and an independent tip-off by Gerhard Klammer that the Israeli government decided to put Eichmann to trial. Mossad agents shadowed Adolf Eichmann and finally abducted him to Israel in 1960, where he was put on trial in 1961 and executed after his conviction in 1962.

In 1961 Lothar Hermann wrote to the Israeli government to collect a 10,000 dollars reward set up by Tuviah Friedman. The government declined, arguing that Friedman was not officially representing the State of Israel. During the letter exchange, Hermann threatened to report the abductors to the authorities, citing "extortion and deception" committed during the operation.

On 21 March 1961 Hermann was arrested by the Argentinian police. According to them, they had believed him to be the concentration camp doctor Josef Mengele due to misinformation. Mistreated in prison, only a comparison of the fingerprints exonerated him 14 days after his arrest. In the following years, Lothar had to hide according to his family, due to harassment and threats by local national socialists.

In December 1971, Hermann wrote to the Israeli government again; this time, the cabinet of Golda Meir agreed to pay him a monthly sum of money as reward, twelve years after he had provided the information.
