= Irmtrud Wojak =

German historian (born 1963)

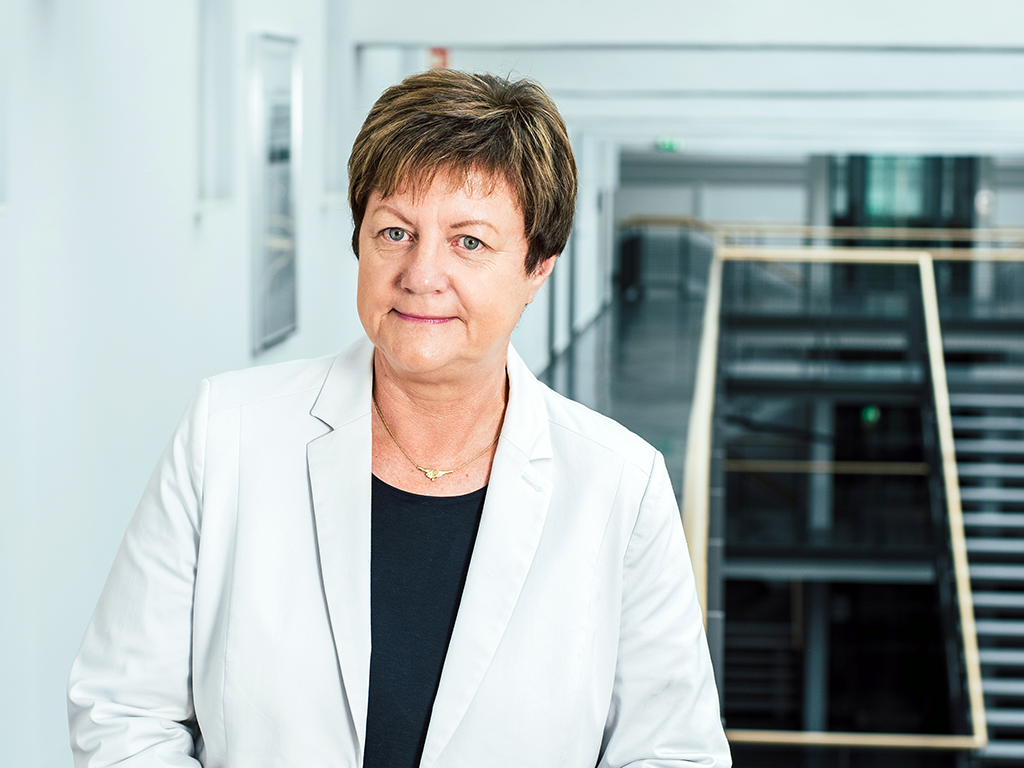
Wojak in 2022

Irmtrud Wojak (born 1963) is a German historian. From the end of March 2009 until November 2011, she was the founding director of the Munich Documentation Centre for the History of National Socialism.

== Life ==
Wojak studied history, social history and economic history as well as political science at the Ruhr-Universität Bochum. She gained her doctorate with a thesis on German Jewish and political emigration during the NS period to Latin America, also in Bochum. She then completed several research stays, including at the Yad Vashem Holocaust Memorial in Jerusalem and at the United States Holocaust Memorial Museum in Washington. Subsequently, she was a research associate and deputy director of the Fritz Bauer Institut in Frankfurt.

In Frankfurt, she created the exhibition "Auschwitz-Prozess. 4 Ks 2/63. Frankfurt am Main" and habilitated herself with a biography of Fritz Bauer. She then became head of research and a member of the management team at the International Tracing Service (ITS) in Bad Arolsen.

Her main areas of research are.

- History of National Socialism and the Holocaust
- Exile research
- History of the Federal Republic of Germany, especially legal reappraisal in the post-war period

== Founding director of the NS Documentation Centre Munich ==
Wojak was appointed founding director of the planned Nazi Documentation Centre in Munich in 2009. According to media reports, in May 2011 there were heated arguments between individual Munich city councillors, the centre's board of trustees and Wojak, among others, about the name of the planned centre. Wojak spoke out against a name that contained the abbreviation "NS". The board of trustees of the planned centre and several contemporary witnesses had expressed similar views. The centre had been planned by the city of Munich from the beginning under the working name "NS-Dokumentationszentrum". Munich city councillor Marian Offman stressed that not all contemporary witnesses had spoken out against the abbreviation. Wojak is then said to have indirectly accused Offman of playing contemporary witnesses off against each other. The Lord Mayor Christian Ude announced disciplinary steps in April 2011 as a result of this, and the city councillor Marian Offman, who is also vice-president of the Jewish Community of Munich, demanded an apology from Wojak. Wojak also saw this as a party-political dispute.

At the end of October 2011, Wojak was relieved of her duties as director of the NS Documentation Centre because she had not presented a coherent concept for the exhibition at the NS Documentation Centre. In addition, her communication style was criticised. She had also failed to cooperate with her team. Wojak, on the other hand, initially emphasised that she had not had the opportunity to explain her concept, as it had been presented without her on 7 October due to illness. In mid-November, an agreement was finally reached and a joint press release was issued by Wojak and the City of Munich, which spoke of "sustained differences of opinion" between Wojak and the advisory bodies about the "orientation, content and function" of the planned centre, due to which a separation had taken place. Press release NS-Dokumentationszentrum München.

== Awards ==
- 2014: For her biography on the life of Fritz Bauer, Wojak became the first German historian to be appointed Fellow at the Radcliffe Institute for Advanced Study at Harvard University.

== Publications ==
- Fritz Bauer 1903–1968. Eine Biographie, Munich 2009
- Eichmanns Memoiren. Ein kritischer Essay, Frankfurt 2001
- Exil in Chile. Die deutsch-jüdische und politische Emigration während des Nationalsozialismus 1933–1945, Berlin 1994
- Irmtrud Wojak und Susanne Meinl (ed.) im Auftrag des Fritz-Bauer-Instituts: Völkermord und Kriegsverbrechen in der ersten Hälfte des 20. Jahrhunderts, Frankfurt: Campus-Verlag 2004, ISBN 3-593-37282-7.
