= Yitzhak Raveh =

Israeli judge (1906–1989)

- יצחק רווה
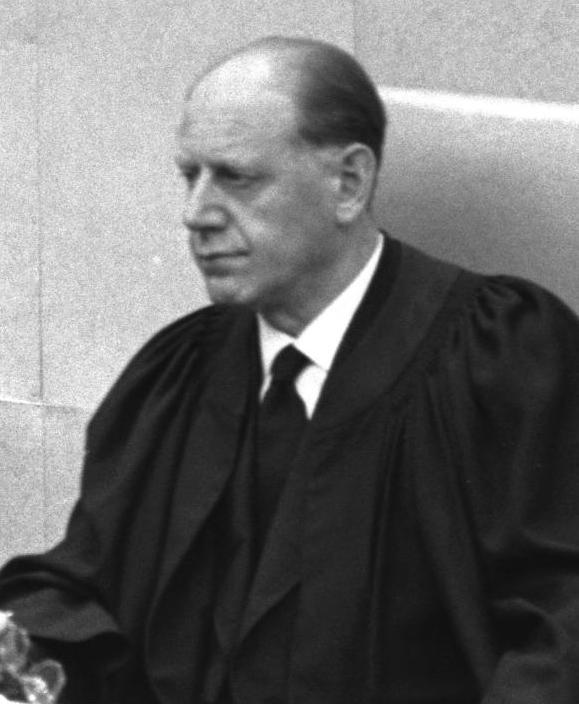
- Raveh presiding over the trial of Adolf Eichmann

Tel Aviv-Yafo District Court, Judge
- In office 1952–1976

Personal details
- Born: 10 November 1906 Aurich, Lower Saxony, Kingdom of Prussia, German Empire
- Died: 8 November 1989 (aged 82) Tel Aviv, Israel

Yitzhak Raveh (Hebrew: יצחק רווה; 10 November 1906 – 8 November 1989) was a German-born Israeli judge who was one of the panel of three judges presiding over the trial of Adolf Eichmann. The other judges were Moshe Landau and Benjamin Halevi.

== Biography ==
Yitzhak Raveh was born in Aurich, Lower Saxony, Germany, the youngest of six children born to Heinrich and Selma Reuss. He was given the name Franz Reuss. His father was a teacher, Hebrew scholar and author. When he was two years old, his family moved to Berlin.

Reuss grew up in an environment of both German and Jewish cultures. After completing his primary and secondary education at local German schools, he studied law at the University of Berlin, completing his degree in 1927. He earned a Doctorate of Law in 1929 at the University of Halle. After two years of private practice, Reuss was appointed as a Court Assessor, Assistant Judge, and Judge at the Court of First Instance at Charlottenburg, positions he held from 1931 until the spring of 1933.

When the Nazi Party came to power that year, Reuss sensed an increasing animosity and competitiveness directed at him by his colleagues at the court, causing him to resign his post on March 31, 1933. The next day, all Jewish Judges who had been admitted to the Bar after 1 August 1914 were permanently removed from the bench. Within a month, Judge Reuss, with his young wife Batya, boarded a ship for the British mandate of Palestine.

== Legal career ==
Reuss resumed his legal profession in Palestine. He rose from private law practice, through directorship of the new Israeli Land Registration Ministry, followed by his appointment in 1952 as judge in the Tel Aviv District Court, He held this position until his retirement in 1976, specializing in Land Law. Upon accepting the judgeship, he officially changed his name to Yitzhak Raveh (initially spelled Ravé).

In 1960, Judge Raveh agreed to serve on a special, three-judge panel at the Jerusalem District Court created for the trial of Adolf Eichmann, who had been instrumental in the annihilation of millions of European Jews during the Second World War. Raveh had been asked to serve because of his judicial acumen, his familiarity with the German language, literature, philosophy, educational system and culture, and because he had lost no family in the war. (His parents were dead and his siblings had all left Germany before the war began.) His familiarity with German philosophy and education became pivotal to the trial, as in questioning the defendant, Raveh forced Eichmann to assume and acknowledge responsibility for his actions in accordance with the moral law dogma prescribed by German philosopher Immanuel Kant, whom Eichmann had studied as a student.

As an expert in Land Law, Raveh later headed a parliamentary committee, named after him, which overhauled Israeli rental laws, including those for the protection of lodgers. Raveh also lectured at symposia at the Tel Aviv University, wrote for law journals, and trained future lawyers and judges.

After retiring from the court, Raveh pursued his lifelong interests of reading, music appreciation and travel. He died in 1989 from complications of prostatic cancer and heart failure. His wife predeceased him in 1983. He was survived by two daughters and three grandchildren.

== See also ==
- Israeli law
