= Avner Less =

Israeli police officer (1916–1987)

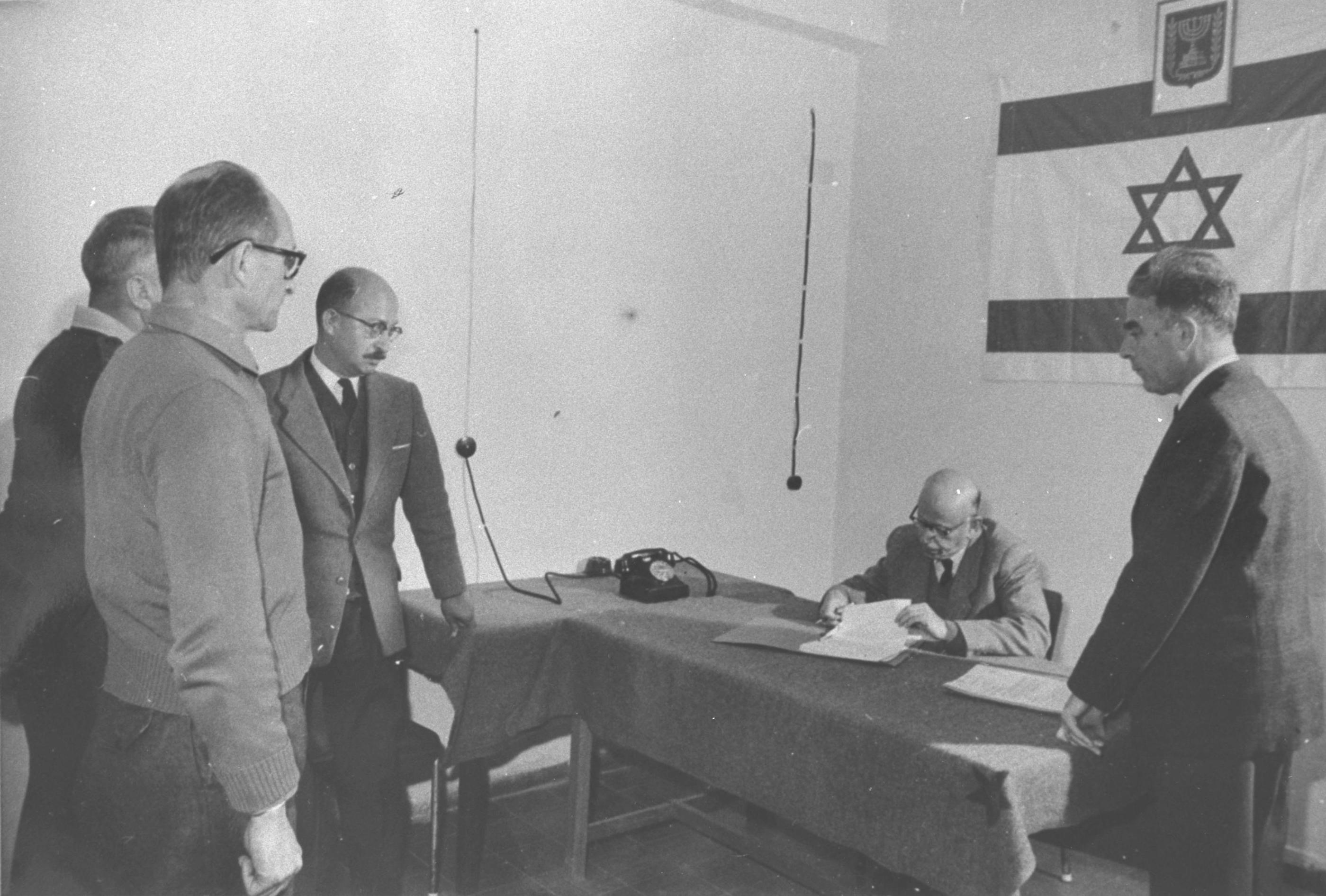
- Born: 1916; Berlin, Germany
- Died: 1987 (aged 70–71); Zürich, Switzerland
- Police career
- Country: Israel Police
- Allegiance: State of Israel
- Department: Israel Police

Avner Werner Less (18 December 1916 – 7 January 1987) was a German-born Israeli police officer, best known for interrogating former German SS officer Adolf Eichmann after he was captured by Mossad agents in Argentina and brought to Israel to stand trial.

== Life and career ==
Less was born in Berlin, Germany in 1916. He attended the Wald-Oberschule in Charlottenburg. In 1933, after the Nazis assumed power, he emigrated to France, where he started an agricultural studies.

In 1938, he emigrated to Mandatory Palestine, and during his first years there, worked on orange plantations. From 1941 to 1948, he was a police officer in Haifa and price checker for the local district. After Israeli independence in 1948, he became head of the Import-Export Section of the Ministry of Industry and Trade, and was Deputy-Director of the Legal Department for price control in the Haifa district. In 1951, he joined the Israel Police, and worked in the Department of Economic Crimes. From 1954 to 1968, while still an officer in the Israel Police, he was loaned to the Foreign Service. He initially served as an attaché in New York City, and as permanent representative of Israel to the annual conference of the UN Drug Commission in Geneva, and as a representative of Israel at Interpol.

In 1960, Less, now a Chief Inspector in the Israel Police, was tasked with interrogating former German SS officer Adolf Eichmann, who was captured by Mossad agents in Argentina in May 1960 and brought to Israel to stand trial. For nine months, Less served as Eichmann's interrogator, questioning him daily for a total of 275 hours. He was the only investigator allowed to speak to Eichmann. The transcripts of the interrogation were forwarded to prosecutors. In 1961, Less testified and was cross-examined at Eichmann's trial. Extracts from the interrogation of Eichmann by Less have been published in the 1983 book Eichmann Interrogated.

After Eichmann was convicted, Less left for France to serve as Israel's consul in Paris. He was already in Paris when he heard of Eichmann's execution. He lectured on the Eichmann trial in schools throughout Europe, including in Germany. In 1964, Less traveled to Germany at the request of prosecutors to testify at the trial of two Nazi war criminals on trial in Frankfurt over their role in the murder of 400,000 Hungarian Jews. While in Germany, a German nationalist newspaper demanded his arrest as an accessory to the abduction of Adolf Eichmann. This was not taken seriously by authorities.

After completing his term as consul in Paris, Less did not return to Israel and remained in Europe. He settled in Switzerland in 1968, and until 1971 was a member of the Banque de Crédit International Genève. In 1972, he became head of internal security for Bank Robinson AG in Basel. From 1976 to 1979, he worked at the Company for Bank Revisions in Basel, and in 1979, he was employed by Neutra Treuhand AG as internal controller. In May 1982, Less's full rapprochement with Germany and the German people became clear when at his request, he was granted citizenship by West Germany, becoming a dual Israeli-German citizen. Less died in Zürich in 1987, at age 71.

== In popular culture ==
- Less was portrayed by American actor Troy Garity in the 2007 film, Eichmann, which dramatizes Eichmann's interrogation.
