= William Lovell Hull =

Canadian Reverend

- Born: William Lovell Hull; December 3, 1897; Winnipeg
- Died: September 1, 1992 (aged 94); Simcoe, Ontario
- Resting place: Oakwood Cemetery, Simcoe Ontario
- Education: Kelvin High School
- Spouse: Lillian Pachal (1998–1985)
- Children: 1 Elizabeth Hull (1939-)

William Lovell Hull (December 3, 1897 – September 1, 1992) was a Canadian Christian minister.

Hull was born to William Frederick Hull and Annie Lovell. He was educated at Kelvin High School. He married Lillian Pachal (1898–1985) of Winnipeg on 6 November 1916. After working in Winnipeg for some years, and being ordained to the ministry, he moved to Jerusalem in 1935 having received a "call from God" during a service at Zion Apostolic Church.

The Reverend Hull devoted the next twenty-seven years to missionary work in Jerusalem. In 1947, Hull significantly influenced Justice Ivan C. Rand (1884–1969), the Canadian member of the United Nations Special Committee on Palestine, to understand and positively support the United Nations Partition Plan for Palestine, which was among the factors in the creation of the State of Israel.

In 1962, Hull was the spiritual counselor to Nazi war criminal Adolf Eichmann during Eichmann's trial in Israel and following his conviction and death sentence. He attended Eichmann's execution. Hull returned to Canada later that year and wrote The Struggle for a Soul about his experiences with Eichmann.

The Reverend Hull retired to Simcoe, Ontario, Canada, in 1963. He died September 1, 1992 and was buried in Oakwood Cemetery at Simcoe.

== Works ==
- The Fall and Rise of Israel The Story of the Jewish People During the time of their Dispersal and Regathering, Grand Rapids: Zondervan Publishing Co., 1953
- The Struggle for a Soul The Untold Story of a Minister's Final Effort to Convert Adolf Eichmann, Garden City, N.Y.: Doubleday & Company, Inc., 1963
- Israel Key to Prophecy, Grand Rapids: Zondervan Publishing Co., 1957
