= Ricardo Eichmann =

German archaeologist (born 1955)

- Born: Ricardo Francisco Eichmann; November 2, 1955 (age 70); Buenos Aires, Argentina
- Occupation: Archaeologist
- Children: 2
- Parent: Adolf Eichmann (father)

Academic background
- Education: Heidelberg University

Academic work
- Discipline: Near Eastern archaeology
- Institutions: University of Tübingen; German Archaeological Institute

Ricardo Francisco Eichmann (born November 2, 1955) is an Argentine-born German archaeologist. He was the director of the Orient Department of the German Archaeological Institute between 1996 and 2020, and previously a professor of Near Eastern archaeology at the University of Tübingen.

== Early life ==
Ricardo Francisco Eichmann was born on November 2, 1955, in Buenos Aires. He is the youngest son of Adolf Eichmann and Vera Eichmann (née Liebl). He has three older brothers. Eichmann was five years old when his father was captured and taken from Argentina to Israel by Mossad. As a teenager, Eichmann learned of his father's history from books. He rejected the Nazi ideology of his father and accepted that his execution was justified.

From 1977, Eichmann studied prehistory and protohistory, classical archaeology and Egyptology at Heidelberg University. His 1984 dissertation was titled Prehistoric Aspects of Floor Plans in the Middle East.

== Academic career ==
Eichmann is an archaeologist. From 1984 to 1994, he worked first as a scientific consultant and later as a research assistant in the Baghdad department of the German Archaeological Institute in Berlin. Eichmann was then briefly Professor of Near Eastern archaeology at the University of Tübingen from 1995 to 1996. From 1996 to 2019 he was the first director of the Orient Department of the German Archaeological Institute in Berlin, being succeeded by Margarete van Ess in 2020. His research interests include music archaeology in the Near East and Egypt.

== Personal life ==
In 1995, he met Zvi Aharoni, the Mossad agent who was chiefly responsible for his father's capture. Eichmann declines most requests for interviews. He has two sons.

== Selected works ==
- Eichmann, Ricardo; Schaudig, Hanspeter; Hausleiter, Arnulf (November 2006). "Archaeology and epigraphy at Tayma (Saudi Arabia)". Arabian Archaeology and Epigraphy. 17 (2): 163–176. doi:10.1111/j.1600-0471.2006.00269.x. ISSN 0905-7196.
- Eichmann, Ricardo (2007). Uruk: Architektur. Von den Anfängen bis zur frühdynastischen Zeit (in German). Verlag Marie Leidorf. ISBN 978-3-89646-036-3.
- Eichmann, Ricardo; Koch, Lars-Christian, eds. (2015). Musikarchäologie: Klänge der Vergangenheit (in German). Theiss. ISBN 978-3-8062-3007-9.
