= Eichmann Interrogated =

1982 non-fiction book by Jochen von Lang

- First edition (German)
- Author: Jochen von Lang
- Original title: Das Eichmann-Protokoll
- Translator: Ralph Manheim
- Language: English
- Publisher: Severin und Siedler (Germany); Farrar, Straus and Giroux
- Publication date: 1982
- Publication place: Canada
- English publication date: 1983
- Media type: Print hardcover
- Pages: 293
- ISBN: 0-88619-017-7
- OCLC: 11619460

Eichmann Interrogated: Transcripts From the Archives of the Israeli Police is a 1982 non-fiction book containing selections from the pre-trial interrogation of high-ranking former Nazi official Adolf Eichmann. It is edited by Jochen von Lang and Claus Sibyl, and translated from German into English by Ralph Manheim.

== Synopsis ==
Eichmann was a German World War II war criminal who was living in Argentina under a false identity when he was captured by Israeli forces in 1960. Upon being brought to Israel, he was interrogated for 275 hours before his trial. This book contains testimony where Eichmann speaks of his life, from childhood to his years in hiding, though the focus is on his role in organizing the mass executions of civilians, particularly Jews, by the Nazi regime.

Eichmann Interrogated reads mostly as Eichmann denying any personal responsibility for Germany's mass executions. He repeatedly claims he was only in charge of transportation of Jewish and enemy civilians, he was only following orders, and that disobeying such orders would have result in his own execution. He also claims that other, previously tried German war criminals, deliberately implicated him to mitigate their personal responsibility. Eichmann also denies any feelings of antisemitism; indeed, he claims to have attempted to create a homeland for Jews, once in Madagascar and later in Eastern Europe.

These claims are challenged by his interrogator, Avner W. Less, a German Jew who escaped the Holocaust and immigrated to Israel. Less, who is also quoted in the book, often asks Eichmann about a particular event; after Eichmann denied knowledge of or culpability for it, Less would produce a signed document or other evidence to show Eichmann was responsible. Eichmann referred to Less as "Herr Hauptmann," German for "Mr. Captain."

Eichmann: Except for the Jewish functionaries, with whom I worked all those years, I did not decide a single personal fate; and as for the functionaries, I never decided their fate, I never had any of them evacuated, let alone killed . . . or anything of the kind.

Less: Now let me show you a letter of December 2, 1942, from your bureau to the Foreign Office. "Re: The Jew and former French prisoner of war Roger Masse, born in 1884. The above-mentioned Jew was deported to the East - Auschwitz - on June 5, 1942. For reasons of principle, I cannot agree to having him shipped back. per proc. Eichmann."

Eichmann: That's a normal routine communication, drafted by a clerk.

Less: But it shows that you personally . . .

Eichmann: Herr Hauptmann, it's a form letter. A routine communication. It's not a decision on my part.

Less: But it says "I": "For reasons of principle, I cannot agree . . ."

Eichmann: Yes, yes, of course. That's a bureaucratic . . . always the same old story . . . obviously. I was the bureau head. It had to have my name on it. This letter had no effect on the fate of the man concerned.

Less: Of course not, because he wasn't sent back. Quite right.

From page 141. (All ellipses are in the original)

== Quotes ==
I obeyed. Regardless of what I was ordered to do, I would have obeyed. Certainly, I would have obeyed. I obeyed, I obeyed. (Page 198)

I obeyed my orders without thinking, I just did as I was told. That's where I found my - how shall I say? - my fulfillment. It made no difference what the orders were, Herr Hauptmann. (Page 157)

I have a lot on my conscience. I know that, Herr Hauptmann. But I had nothing to do with killing the Jews. I never killed a Jew, but I never killed a non-Jew either - I've never killed anybody. And I never ordered anybody to kill a Jew, or ordered anybody to kill a non-Jew. No, never. (Page 101)

Reading from a memo from Rudolf Höss, another high-ranking German war criminal, who had been captured in 1946 and tried and executed in Poland in 1947:

Less: I shall now read you a passage from Höss' memoirs: "Eichmann came to see me in Auschwitz and acquainted me with the plans for actions in the various countries. First, Upper Silesia and the adjoining parts of the Government General were to be drawn upon. Then, proceeding geographically, the Jews from Germany and Czechoslovakia, then those from the West - France, Belgium, and Holland. We went on to discuss the extermination process. It transpired that only gas could be considered, because to eliminate the masses that were to be expected by shooting was absolutely impossible and also too hard on the SS men involved, having to shoot women and children."

Eichmann: I will not shoulder the blame for things I didn't do, Herr Hauptmann. All that stuff was made up by Höss; it has nothing whatever to do with me.

Less: Other people made similar statements, not just Höss, and there is no reason to suppose that their stories were made to order. They had no means of getting together and saying: Now let's all of us save our skins by testifying against Eichmann. Every one of those who testified knew what was in store for him. (Pages 121-122)
