= Gerhard Klammer =

German geologist

- Died: 1982
- Spouse: Ilse

Gerhard Klammer was a German geologist who informed authorities that Adolf Eichmann was hiding in Argentina, which led to his capture by Mossad. Klammer and Eichmann, under the alias 'Ricardo Klement', both worked for CAPRI Construction in Tucumán Province. Klammer recognized 'Klement' as Eichmann, and, when he returned to Germany, attempted to report him, but German authorities did not take action. He confided in his friend Giselher Pohl, a priest, who told his bishop of Klammer's sighting. This led to Mossad's investigation and kidnapping of Eichmann.

Klammer attended university in Göttingen, as did his future wife Ilse and their friends, Rosemarie and Giselher Pohl; Klammer studied geology, history, and philosophy. Klammer applied in 1939 to join the SS, but his application was rejected, as his father had tuberculosis. After seeing images of concentration camps, Klammer left Germany.

Klammer died in 1982, wishing for his role as an informant to be hidden. His family gave permission for his role to be revealed in 2021.
