= Eichmann in Jerusalem =

1963 book by Hannah Arendt

Eichmann in Jerusalem: A Report on the Banality of Evil
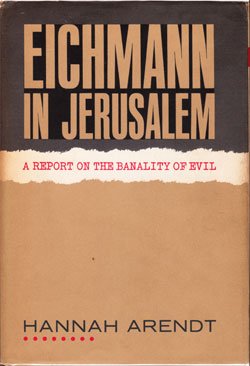
- Cover of the first edition
- Author: Hannah Arendt
- Language: English
- Publisher: Viking Press
- Publication date: 1963
- Media type: Print (Hardcover, Paperback)
- Pages: 312

Eichmann in Jerusalem: A Report on the Banality of Evil is a 1963 book by the philosopher and political thinker Hannah Arendt. A Jew who fled Germany during Adolf Hitler's rise to power, Arendt reported for The New Yorker on the trial of Adolf Eichmann, one of the key organizers of the Holocaust. A revised and enlarged edition was published in 1964.

== Theme ==
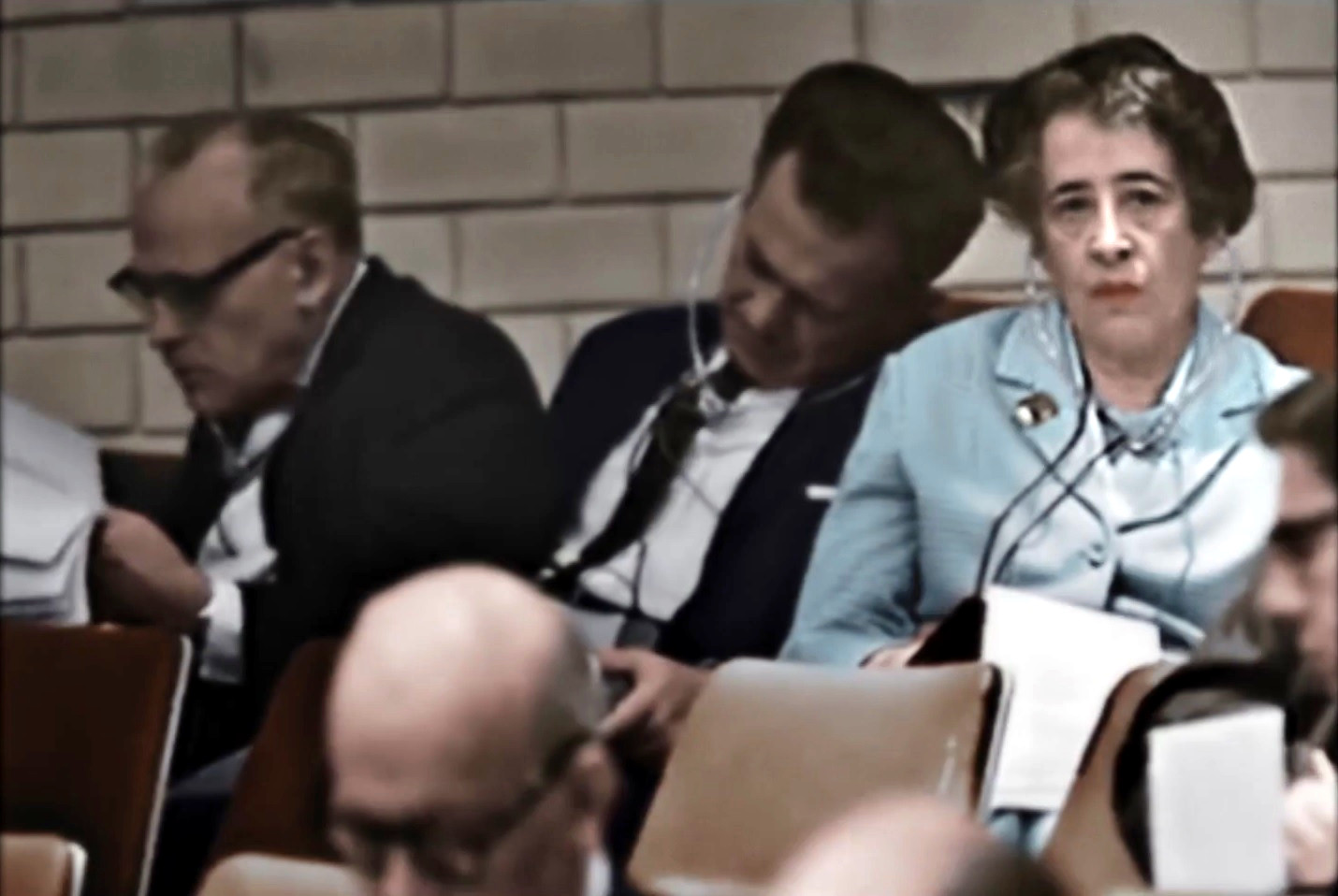
Arendt during the trial

Arendt's subtitle introduced the phrase "the banality of evil". In part the phrase refers to Eichmann's comportment at the trial as the man displayed neither guilt for his actions nor hatred for those trying him, claiming he bore no responsibility because he was simply "doing his job." ("He did his 'duty'...; he not only obeyed 'orders', he also obeyed the 'law'".)

== Eichmann ==
Arendt takes Eichmann's court testimony and the historical evidence available and makes several observations about him:

- Eichmann stated in court that he had always tried to abide by Immanuel Kant's categorical imperative. She argues that Eichmann had essentially taken the wrong lesson from Kant: Eichmann had not recognized the "Golden Rule", as it is recognized in both the Old Testament and the New Testament, and the principle of reciprocity implicit in Kant's categorical imperative, but had misunderstood Kant's moral principles. Eichmann attempted to follow the spirit of the laws he carried out, as if the legislator himself would approve. In Kant's formulation of the categorical imperative, the legislator is the moral self, and all people are legislators; in Eichmann's formulation, the legislator was Hitler. Eichmann claimed this changed when he was charged with carrying out the Final Solution, at which point Arendt says, "He had ceased to live according to Kantian principles, that he had known it, and that he had consoled himself with the thoughts that he no longer 'was master of his own deeds,' that he was unable 'to change anything'".
- Eichmann's inability to think for himself was exemplified by his consistent use of "stock phrases and self-invented clichés". He demonstrated his unrealistic worldview and crippling lack of communication skills through reliance on "officialese" (Amtssprache) and the euphemistic Sprachregelung (convention of speech) that made implementation of Hitler's policies "somehow palatable".
- While Eichmann might have had antisemitic leanings, Arendt argued that he showed "no case of insane hatred of Jews, of fanatical antisemitism or indoctrination of any kind. He personally never had anything whatever against Jews" according to his own testimony.
- Eichmann was a "joiner" his entire life, in that he constantly joined organizations in order to define himself, and had difficulties thinking for himself without doing so. As a youth, he belonged to the YMCA, the Wandervogel, and the Jungfrontkämpferverband. In 1933, he failed in his attempt to join the Schlaraffia (a men's organization similar to Freemasonry), at which point a family friend (and future war criminal) Ernst Kaltenbrunner encouraged him to join the SS. At the end of World War II, Eichmann found himself depressed because "it then dawned on him that thenceforward he would have to live without being a member of something or other". Arendt pointed out that his actions were not driven by malice, but rather blind dedication to the regime and his need to belong, to be a joiner. In his own words: "I sensed I would have to live a leaderless and difficult individual life, I would receive no directives from anybody, no orders and commands would any longer be issued to me, no pertinent ordinances would be there to consult—in brief, a life never known before lay ahead of me."
- Despite his claims, Eichmann was not, in fact, very intelligent. As Arendt details in the book's second chapter, he was unable to complete either high school or vocational training, and only found his first significant job, as a traveling salesman for the Vacuum Oil Company, through family connections. Arendt noted that, during both his SS career and Jerusalem trial, Eichmann tried to cover up his lack of skills and education, and even "blushed" when these facts came to light.
- Arendt confirms Eichmann and the heads of the Einsatzgruppen were part of an "intellectual elite." Unlike the Einsatzgruppen leaders, however, Eichmann would suffer from a "lack of imagination" and an "inability to think."
- Arendt confirms several points where Eichmann actually claimed he was responsible for certain atrocities, even though he lacked the power or expertise to take these actions. Moreover, Eichmann made these claims even though they hurt his defense, hence Arendt's remark that "Bragging was the vice that was Eichmann's undoing". Arendt also suggests that Eichmann may have preferred to be executed as a war criminal than live as a nobody. This parallels his overestimation of his own intelligence and his past value in the organizations in which he had served, as stated above.
- Arendt argues that Eichmann, in his peripheral role at the Wannsee Conference, witnessed the rank-and-file of the German civil service heartily endorse Reinhard Heydrich's program for the Final Solution of the Jewish question in Europe (German: die Endlösung der Judenfrage). Upon seeing members of "respectable society" endorsing mass murder, and enthusiastically participating in the planning of the solution, Eichmann felt that his moral responsibility was relaxed, as if he were "Pontius Pilate".
- During his imprisonment before his trial, the Israeli government sent no fewer than six psychologists to examine Eichmann. These psychologists found no trace of mental illness, including personality disorder. One doctor remarked that his overall attitude towards other people, especially his family and friends, was "highly desirable", while another remarked that Eichmann was, "More normal, at any rate, than I am after having examined him".

Arendt suggests that this most strikingly discredits the idea that the Nazi criminals were manifestly psychopathic and different from "normal" people. From this document, many concluded that situations such as the Holocaust can make even the most ordinary of people commit horrendous crimes with the proper incentives, but Arendt adamantly disagreed with this interpretation, as Eichmann was voluntarily following the Führerprinzip. Arendt said that moral choice remains even under totalitarianism, and that this choice has political consequences even when the chooser is politically powerless:

[U]nder conditions of terror most people will comply but some people will not, just as the lesson of the countries to which the Final Solution was proposed is that "it could happen" in most places but it did not happen everywhere. Humanly speaking, no more is required, and no more can reasonably be asked, for this planet to remain a place fit for human habitation.

Arendt mentions, as a case in point, Denmark:

One is tempted to recommend the story as required reading in political science for all students who wish to learn something about the enormous power potential inherent in non-violent action and in resistance to an opponent possessing vastly superior means of violence. It was not just that the people of Denmark refused to assist in implementing the Final Solution, as the peoples of so many other conquered nations had been persuaded to do (or had been eager to do) — but also, that when the Reich cracked down and decided to do the job itself it found that its own personnel in Denmark had been infected by this and were unable to overcome their human aversion with the appropriate ruthlessness, as their peers in more cooperative areas had.

On Eichmann's personality, Arendt concludes:

Despite all the efforts of the prosecution, everybody could see that this man was not a "monster," but it was difficult indeed not to suspect that he was a clown. And since this suspicion would have been fatal to the entire enterprise [his trial], and was also rather hard to sustain in view of the sufferings he and his like had caused to millions of people, his worst clowneries were hardly noticed and almost never reported.

Arendt ended the book by writing:

And just as you [Eichmann] supported and carried out a policy of not wanting to share the earth with the Jewish people and the people of a number of other nations—as though you and your superiors had any right to determine who should and who should not inhabit the world—we find that no one, that is, no member of the human race, can be expected to want to share the earth with you. This is the reason, and the only reason, you must hang.

== Legality of the trial ==
Beyond her discussion of Eichmann himself, Arendt discusses several additional aspects of the trial, its context, and the Holocaust.

- She points out that Eichmann was kidnapped by Israeli agents in Argentina and transported to Israel, an illegal act, and that he was tried in Israel even though he was not accused of committing any crimes there. "If he had not been found guilty before he appeared in Jerusalem, guilty beyond any reasonable doubt, the Israelis would never have dared, or wanted, to kidnap him in formal violation of Argentine law."
- She describes his trial as a show trial arranged and managed by Prime Minister Ben-Gurion, and says that Ben-Gurion wanted, for several political reasons, to emphasize not primarily what Eichmann had done, but what the Jews had suffered during the Holocaust. She points out that the war criminals tried at Nuremberg were "indicted for crimes against the members of various nations," without special reference to the Nazi genocide against the Jews.
- She questions Israel's right to try Eichmann. Israel was a signatory to the 1950 UN Genocide Convention, which rejected universal jurisdiction and required that defendants be tried "in the territory of which the act was committed" or by an international tribunal. The court in Jerusalem did not pursue either option.
- Eichmann's deeds were not crimes under German law, as, at that time, in the eyes of the Third Reich, he was a law-abiding citizen. He was tried for 'crimes in retrospect'.
- The prosecutor, Gideon Hausner, followed the tone set by Prime Minister Ben-Gurion, who stated, "It is not an individual nor the Nazi regime on trial, but antisemitism throughout history." Hausner's corresponding opening statements, which heavily referenced biblical passages, was "bad history and cheap rhetoric," according to Arendt. Furthermore, it suggested that Eichmann was no criminal, but the "innocent executor of some foreordained destiny."

== Banality of evil ==
Arendt's book introduced the expression and concept of the banality of evil. Her thesis is that Eichmann was actually not a fanatic or a sociopath, but instead an average and mundane person who relied on clichéd defenses rather than thinking for himself, was motivated by professional promotion rather than ideology, and believed in success which he considered the chief standard of "good society". Banality, in this sense, does not mean that Eichmann's actions were in any way ordinary, but that his actions were motivated by a sort of complacency which was wholly unexceptional.

Many mid-20th century pundits were favorable to the concept, which has been called "one of the most memorable phrases of 20th-century intellectual life," and it features in many contemporary debates about morality and justice, as well as in the workings of truth and reconciliation commissions. Others see the popularization of the concept as a valuable warrant against walking negligently into horror, as the evil of banality, in which failure to interrogate received wisdom results in individual and systemic weakness and decline.

== Alleged Jewish cooperation ==
Another controversial point raised by Arendt in her book is her criticism of the alleged role of Jewish authorities in the Holocaust. In her writings, Arendt expressed her objections to the prosecution's refusal to address the cooperation of the leaders of the Judenräte with the Nazis. In the book, Arendt says that Jewish organizations and leaderships in Europe collaborated with the Nazis and were directly responsible for increasing the numbers of Jewish victims:

Wherever Jews lived, there were recognized Jewish leaders, and this leadership, almost without exception, cooperated in one way or another, for one reason or another, with the Nazis. The whole truth was that if the Jewish people had really been unorganized and leaderless, there would have been chaos and plenty of misery but the total number of victims would hardly have been between four and a half and six million people. According to Freudiger's calculations about half of them could have saved themselves if they had not followed the instructions of the Jewish Councils.

She adds that Pinchas Freudiger, a witness at the trial, had managed to survive the genocide because he was wealthy and able to buy the favors of the Nazi authorities, as did other leaders of Jewish Councils.

On several occasions, most notably in her interviews with Joachim Fest and Günter Gaus, Arendt rejected this characterization of her writing, describing instead ways in which the Judenräte were coerced and intimidated into their roles, and how the Nazis made examples of populations that resisted, saying in a response during an interview with Günter Gaus, "When people reproach me with accusing the Jewish people [of nonresistance], that is a malignant lie and propaganda and nothing else. The tone of voice, however, is an objection against me personally. And I cannot do anything about that."

== Reception and controversy ==
Eichmann in Jerusalem upon publication and in the years following was controversial. Arendt has long been accused of "blaming the victim" in the book.

=== Allegation of slander against Zionism ===
Arendt responded to the initial criticism in a postscript to the book:

The controversy began by calling attention to the conduct of the Jewish people during the years of the Final Solution, thus following up the question, first raised by the Israeli prosecutor, of whether the Jews could or should have defended themselves. I had dismissed that question as silly and cruel, since it testified to a fatal ignorance of the conditions at the time. It has now been discussed to exhaustion, and the most amazing conclusions have been drawn. The well-known historico-sociological construct of "ghetto mentality"... has been repeatedly dragged in to explain behavior which was not at all confined to the Jewish people and which therefore cannot be explained by specifically Jewish factors ... This was the unexpected conclusion certain reviewers chose to draw from the "image" of a book, created by certain interest groups, in which I allegedly had claimed that the Jews had murdered themselves.

The allegation that Arendt mischaracterizes Zionists and misreads Eichmann's motivations are the two major themes of the critique of the article. Arendt's article largely refutes the claims made against it, but critics focus on the lack of rhetorical handholding in the parts where Arendt summarizes Eichmann's defense (whose transcripts run to many thousands of pages).

=== Allegation of mischaracterizing Eichmann ===
Some of Arendt's critics insinuate that she wrongly believed that her audience knew—and could keep in mind—that Eichmann was so obviously and inarguably an antisemite, whatever he might claim in his defense, that it was unnecessary for her to point this out at every turn.

In her articles, Arendt also made use of H. G. Adler's book Theresienstadt 1941–1945: The Face of a Coerced Community, which she had read in manuscript. Adler took her view of Eichmann to task in his keynote essay "What does Hannah Arendt know about Eichmann and the Final Solution?" (Allgemeine Wochenzeitung der Juden in Deutschland. 20 November 1964).

In his 2006 book Becoming Eichmann: Rethinking the Life, Crimes and Trial of a "Desk Murderer", Holocaust researcher David Cesarani questioned Arendt's portrait of Eichmann on several grounds. According to Cesarani, Arendt attended only part of the trial, witnessing Eichmann's testimony for "at most four days" and based her writings mostly on recordings and the trial transcript. Cesarani feels this may have skewed her opinion of him, since it was in the parts of the trial she missed that the more forceful aspects of his character appeared. Cesarani also suggests that Eichmann was in fact highly antisemitic and that his antisemitism strongly motivated his actions. Thus, he alleges that Arendt's opinion that his motives were "banal" and non-ideological and that he had abdicated his autonomy of choice by obeying Hitler's orders without question may stand on weak foundations. This is a recurrent criticism of Arendt, though nowhere in her work does Arendt deny that Eichmann was an anti-Semite, nor did she say Eichmann was "simply" following orders.

When Arendt spoke of antisemitism in relation to whether Eichmann was an anti-Semite himself she was summarizing Eichmann's account of himself in the transcripts. Perhaps she considered it so obvious that he was antisemitic that she felt no need to underline the point. She notes this in her interview with Joachim Fest.

Arendt had, after all, written the first major manual in the literature of antisemitism outside the propaganda materials produced by the antisemitic parties themselves—a fact she never mentions in the interviews. She considers pointing out Eichmann's antisemitism or proving rhetorically that there is a dissonance between his claims and what he understands (or fails to understand) in his testimony to be histrionic and unnecessary.

It is the psychic dissonance—the fact that Eichmann is apparently so lacking in self-reflection and so much more motivated by his instinctual careerism than by his hatred of Jews—that Arendt highlights. She appears to make the mistake of focusing on a difficult point of interest that produced a new clarification of the problem of antisemitism under the Third Reich rather than of reciting what well-informed readers of her article in The New Yorker already knew from 40 years of headlines at the time she was writing.

Cesarani, after Adler and others, suggests that Arendt's prejudices influenced the opinions she expressed during the trial. He argues that like many Jews of German origin, she held Ostjuden (Jews from Eastern Europe) in great disdain.

Cesarani's suggestion may be refuted by the fact that Arendt once instigated a class rebellion against her gymnasium instructor in defense of several Ostjuden refugees from Silesia he had repeatedly abused and was expelled from her preparatory school as a consequence. The suggestion that Arendt held Ostjuden in contempt also may be refuted by the fact that Arendt was herself a borderline Ostjude relative to most of her Jewish and gentile German acquaintances, having grown up in Königsberg in a region (East Prussia) that was cut off from the rest of Germany and isolated by a part of Polish territory by the time she was 12. (Königsberg is now Kaliningrad, a Russian exclave. Borders were redrawn after World War II.)

This alleged racist sentiment, according to Cesarani, led Arendt to attack the conduct and efficacy of the chief prosecutor, Gideon Hausner, who was of Galician Jewish origin—as opposed, presumably, to what he actually said or did during the trial. According to Cesarani, Arendt wrote to the German philosopher Karl Jaspers that Hausner was "a typical Galician Jew... constantly making mistakes. Probably one of those people who doesn't know any language." Cesarani does not explore whether one of the mistakes Hausner made, which Arendt highlights in her treatment of the trial, was accusing the Jews of the ghetto of never resisting their deportation—an assertion Arendt calls "foolish and cruel".

Cesarani says that some of Arendt's opinions of Jews of Middle Eastern origin verged on racism, citing a letter in which she described the Israeli crowds to Karl Jaspers:

My first impression: On top, the judges, the best of German Jewry. Below them, the prosecuting attorneys, Galicians, but still Europeans. Everything is organized by a police force that gives me the creeps, speaks only Hebrew, and looks Arabic. Some downright brutal types among them. They would obey any order. And outside the doors, the Oriental mob, as if one were in Istanbul or some other half-Asiatic country. In addition, and very visible in Jerusalem, the peies [sidelocks] and caftan Jews, who make life impossible for all reasonable people here.

Cesarani does not consider whether Arendt's concern that the aspect of institutional Zionism in Israel has an affinity with the forms of identitarian-style authoritarianism that influenced institutional cooperation between Zionism and Nazism, as Arendt points out in Eichmann in Jerusalem, tempers her reservations about the comportment of Israeli justice in the framing and procedure of Eichmann's case.

The existence of either a pattern of preference for Israelis in penalties or a substantively skewed finding of homicidal aggression among Arab attackers and of justifiable self-defense among Israelis responding to assaults, which might be relevant to Arendt's reservations about the context of the trial, has been dismissed without mention by Cesarini. Arendt's considerations in sizing up the potential character of ensuing legal proceedings in her letter to Jaspers come before she witnessed the trial or read the transcripts. Cesarini does not mention the Arendt's praise for the judicial proceedings in her reporting on the case (as distinct from her equally voluble criticism of the prosecuting attorney), nor does he consider her final analysis of the Israeli justice system (which is largely complimentary) in her book on the subject as possibly more important indications of her opinions and inclinations than the fears she expressed before the main phase of her attendance and review of the trial, which were expressed in a private letter published posthumously by Jaspers's estate.

Cesarani's book was itself criticized. In The New York Times Book Review, Barry Gewen argued that Cesarani's hostility stemmed from his book standing "in the shadow of one of the great books of the last half-century", and that Cesarani's suggestion that Arendt and Eichmann had much in common in their backgrounds, making it easier for her to look down on the proceedings, "reveals a writer in control neither of his material nor of himself."

Arendt was also criticized in responses to her article. Mere weeks after its publication, witness for the prosecution Michael A. Musmanno published "Man With an Unspotted Conscience", an article arguing that Arendt fell prey to her preconceived notions, rendering her work ahistorical. Musmanno also directly criticized her for ignoring the facts offered at the trial: "the disparity between what Miss Arendt states, and what the ascertained facts are, occurs with such a disturbing frequency in her book that it can hardly be accepted as an authoritative historical work." He further condemned Arendt and her work for her prejudices against Hauser and Ben-Gurion depicted in Eichmann in Jerusalem: A Report on the Banality of Evil. Musmanno argued that Arendt revealed "so frequently her own prejudices" that it could not stand as an accurate work.

=== Conformity & Cliché as Determining Forces in Human Behavior ===
Stanley Milgram, who would conduct controversial experiments on obedience, maintains that "Arendt became the object of considerable scorn, even calumny" because she highlighted Eichmann's "banality" and "normalcy", and accepted Eichmann's claim that he did not subjectively experience himself as having evil intents or motives to commit such horrors; nor did he have a thought to the immorality and evil of his actions, or indeed, display, as the prosecution depicted, that he was a sadistic "monster". Milgram’s experimental findings would tend to verify Arendt’s emphasis on Eichmann’s bureaucratic careerism being a powerful driver of actions and decision-making by extrapolations from both qualitative and quantitative behavioral research data.

But Arendt also notes Eichmann’s evident pride in having been responsible for so many deaths. She notes also the rhetorical contradiction of this pride with his claim that he will gladly go to the gallows as a warning to all future antisemites, as well as the contradiction between this sentiment and the entire argument of his defense (that he should not be put to death). Eichmann, as Arendt observes, does not experience the dissonance between these evidently contradictory assertions but finds the aptness of his clichés themselves to be — from the perspective of his own inclination — satisfactory substitutes for moral or ethical evaluation. This, coupled with an inability to imagine the perspective of others, is the individually psychological expression of what Arendt calls the banality of evil, with his amoral form of careerism being the social aspect of this force.

Jacob Robinson published And the Crooked Shall be Made Straight, the first full-length rebuttal showing many of the errors in her book, the title being an allusion to Isaiah 40:4. Robinson presented himself as an expert in international law, omitting that he was an assistant to the prosecutor in the case. Isaiah Trunk's 1972 book Judenrat presents a history of the Jewish community councils set up inside the Nazi ghettoes whose discussion in Arendt's accounting of the historical background and context of Eichmann's crimes is the section of the work that especially caused offence and incited the furor of criticism against the cycle of articles collected in her book Eichmann in Jerusalem.

=== Historical Sources Supporting Arendt’s Characterization of Jewish community councils ===
Arendt had drawn much of the substance of her account of the Judenrat's complicity with Nazi schedules for liquidation from Raul Hilberg's Destruction of the European Jews, a work that is generally not mentioned or critiqued in criticism - presumably because it maintains a neutral historicist stance while recording events, as opposed to Arendt's moral and ethical evaluation of these events in her cycle of articles for the New Yorker. In fact, Eichmann in Jerusalem, according to Hugh Trevor-Roper, is so deeply indebted to Raul Hilberg's The Destruction of the European Jews, that Hilberg himself spoke of plagiarism. The Destruction of the European Jews was at that time, and—given that it is so heavily cited for future essential data in all major historical standards—arguably remains the best standard reference on the administratively designed and militantly executed extermination of European Jews in the Nazi holocaust.

=== Arendt’s Service to Zionist Organizations ===
Also worth noting (though rarely mentioned by Arendt in her own self-defense) is the fact that Arendt had also been an employee of the Zionist World Congress and other Zionist organizations in various capacities, and that she worked during the war in finding placements for refugee children fleeing the Third Reich in Palestine, though she draws a line between her own beliefs and the Zionist platform she speaks as an insider rather than as an outsider of the movement and its organizations within the diaspora, performing work for the benefit of these organizations during the time that she remained inside Germany after Hitler was appointed Chancellor.

=== Arendt’s Assertions Taken Out of Context by Critics vs. The Full Text of Arendt’s Article & Her Argument ===
The inhuman and humanly-impossible-to-resist level of pressure to conform to regulation and commands from the Nazi hierarchy is addressed by Arendt in her articles—she mentions an anecdote citing a situation in which 430 people were tortured for weeks on end after an incidence of infraction as an exemplar of this extenuating circumstance, explanatory of a tendency toward obedience to authority. She also addresses the historical and multigenerational cultural acclimation to rule-following and legal-obedience as a defense mechanism exploited by the Nazis. She even gives at least one, if not several, incidents where Eichmann appears—quite notably—to be an obviously antisemitic sadistic monster. However many of these qualifications appear in the first installment of the cycle whereas she coins the phrase "the banality of evil" in the last article of the series.

=== Distinction between Issues of Historical Fact & Tone of Delivery ===
As Arendt explained in an interview, there seemed to be two kinds objections amongst the challenges and critiques she received. She had been critiqued on questions of historical fact—these critiques were largely invalid, since she had mentioned the historically extenuating details which were appealed to by these critics in her reporting on the trial. But she had also been critiqued on tone—and this accusation, she says, she cannot and does not even want to refute.

ARENDT: Nowhere in my book did I accuse the Jewish people of not resisting. Someone else did. Mr. Haussner of the Israeli public prosecutor’s office. I called the questions he directed at the witnesses in Jerusalem: foolish and cruel…

GAUS: But some of the accusations against you are based on the tone in which the book is written.

ARENDT: Well, that’s a different matter. I can’t say anything against that and I don’t want to. If it’s the thought that one can only write about these things solemnly…Look there are a lot of people who take offense. And I can understand that…That is, I can still laugh. And I really thought that Eichmann was a clown. And I’ll tell you this, I read his police interrogation, 3600 pages, very very carefully. And I don’t know how many times I laughed out loud! Now, this reaction offended people. I cannot help that. But I do know one thing—I’d probably still laugh three minutes before certain death. And they say that is the tone. The tone is largely ironic. That’s absolutely true. The tone is really the person in this case. So when people reproach me with accusing the Jewish people, that is a malicious propaganda lie and nothing else. The tone, however, is an objection against me personally. I can’t help that.

GAUS: You’re prepared to bear that?

ARENDT: Oh, gladly. I can’t tell people,'You misunderstand me and in my heart is really this or that.' That’s ridiculous.

=== Gershom Scholem’s denunciation ===
In a public letter her friend and longtime colleague, Gershom Scholem, accused her of insufficiently displaying her love for the people of Israel in a phrase (Ahavat Israel) which indicates the love and respect of Jewish people (not just in Israel) as if this love were circumscribed by nationalist allegiance (by implication of the term ‘Israel’ denoting Judaism in context of the charge) . In her response, amongst the points she makes to Scholem, was that she bears love for individual persons, not for peoples. The concept of peoples as a whole, she respects—“I always knew that I belonged to the Jewish people [from early youth] before I belonged to the German people” and that her personal considerations for or against Judaism were not relevant to this fact of being a Jew—but, she says, her friends and people that she loved tended to be both German (re: not Jewish according to the terms of her description) and also Jewish. She describes the condition of nascent statelessness as her origin, and exile as her home. She loved thoughtful people whom she knew and happened to be intimate with, she explains, regardless of their ethnic affiliation.

=== Radical Evil & The Banality of Evil ===
By the 21st century, Arendt has been the subject of further and more encompassing criticism from authors Bettina Stangneth and Deborah Lipstadt. Stangneth argues in her work, Eichmann Before Jerusalem, that Eichmann was, in fact, an insidious antisemite—a point which Arendt never denied but which was denied by Eichmann in his defense. She utilized the Sassen Papers and accounts of Eichmann while in Argentina to prove that he was proud of his position as a powerful Nazi and the murders that this allowed him to commit. While she acknowledges that the Sassen Papers were not disclosed in the lifetime of Arendt, she argues that the evidence was there at the trial to prove that Eichmann was an antisemitic murderer and that Arendt simply ignored this.

Arendt pays attention to a theme of the prosecution—in the context of the trial—where the physical murder of any Jewish individual committed by Eichmann with his own hands is investigated (and may later have been proven to the satisfaction of historians) but is not proven beyond a shadow of a doubt in the context of the trial in Jerusalem. She attends to this, according to her own prose in the first article of the cycle, since it was an issue of material concern and focus during the proceedings of the trial. However, in her summation in the final article, she holds him guilty and supports the death sentence decisively in her final statement.

Deborah Lipstadt contends in her book The Eichmann Trial that Arendt was too distracted by her own views of totalitarianism to objectively judge Eichmann. She refers to Arendt's own work on totalitarianism, The Origins of Totalitarianism, as a basis for Arendt's seeking to validate her own work by using Eichmann as an example. Lipstadt further contends that Arendt "wanted the trial to explicate how these societies succeeded in getting others to do their atrocious biddings" and so framed her analysis in a way which would agree with this pursuit.

Lipstadt further insinuates by her objection to self-reference toward the Origins book that Hannah Arendt’s own experience as a Jewish citizen of Weimar Germany and the Third Reich (which is registered throughout the book without autobiographical attribution because her experience was in many respects a common experience of Jews in the Third Reich, many others had been there with her with whom she was still in contact, and so did not belong to her alone) may have influenced her thinking on the subject. Additionally, Arendt’s experience as a person who was arrested and held by the Gestapo for work as a Zionist agent researching and reporting on propaganda internal to Hitler’s regime, and her experience as an inmate of an internment camp—where she helped to organize a mass breakout from the camp as it was being converted to a depot to deport Jews to ghettoes in the east where they would wait to be shipped to concentration camps after the Fall of France (not referred to in any of her books because it was an exceptional incident and not a commonly experienced scenario)—in addition to her research as an authoritative scholar on the subject over the critical decades when the persecution and genocide was being carried out, may have influenced her later thinking about the subject of the Nazi Holocaust.

However, Lipstadt glosses over the fact that the aspect of Eichmann in Jerusalem that is being criticized by her own critique of Arendt, as well as by other critiques of Arendt, is the foregrounding of the banality of evil in Eichmann in Jerusalem as opposed to the ‘Radical Evil’ which she had spoken of in her book on the Origins of Totalitarianism. Additionally, Arendt’s complicity, with the Jewish community councils, in preparing and coordinating the populations of the ghettoes for deportation to the camps is framed as provocation rather than historical fact. The issues that Lipstadt and others have taken exception to in Arendt’s Eichmann report, in other words, are those elements not yet explicitly recorded in the Origins book. Arendt’s critics believe, on the one hand, that she should have stuck with her interpretation in Origins, and on the other hand, they insinuate she should have ignored this earlier material so that the Israeli prosecution's opinion could be accepted without contaminating references or reliance on earlier experiences and research. Arendt’s treatment of radical evil in the Origins book (both essential and contaminating an impartial view of the Israeli judiciary, according to Arendt’s critics) is summarized in an abbreviated form on several occasions by scholars, such as George Steiner. Terry Eagleton writes:

There is a kind of evil which is mysterious because its motive seems not to be to destroy specific beings for specific reasons, but to negate being as such. [...] Hannah Arendt speculates that the Holocaust was not so much a question of killing human beings for human reasons, as of seeking to annihilate the concept of the human as such. This sort of evil is a Satanic parody of the divine, finding in the act of destruction the sort of orgasmic release which one can imagine God finding in the act of creation. It is evil as nihilism —a cackle of mocking laughter at the whole solemnly farcical assumption that anything merely human could ever matter. In its vulgarly knowing way, it delights in unmasking human value as a pretentious sham. It is a raging vindictive fury at existence as such. It is the evil of the Nazi death camps rather than of a hired assassin, or even of a massacre carried out for some political end. It is not the same kind of evil as most terrorism, which is malign but which has a point.

As Arendt explains in several interviews, her introduction of the "banality of evil" as a phrase was not intended as a propositional truth—rather she coined the phrase without intending it to mean anything beyond a descriptive expression of what she had witnessed and discovered through her research as a witness present at the trial who also read the complete the transcripts of the trial. Accordingly, it was her critics who take the notion of the 'Banality of Evil' as a proposition which is verifiable, not Hannah Arendt herself.

Arendt states that she does not intend to retract the charge that Nazism introduces a radical form of evil into the world—a charge that does not depend on her opinion or her earlier discussions of this matter in the Origins of Totalitarianism—as she noted. In Eichmann in Jerusalem, she focuses (according to her own testimony in interviews), on a particular dimension or trait of this larger horizon of evil: the careerism and lack of self-reflection of officers in the Nazi hierarchy as a major element of radical evil, perhaps exceeding their sadism or bloodlust in the range of scaled damage that proceeds from the system they collectively created.

A comparison of Klaus Barbie and Adolph Eichmann, for example, will reveal who was more notably and obviously a sadist, who was more of a careerist and who was responsible, as an officer and as an administrator, for the larger number of deaths between the two.

As is proven by her continuing commentary and journalism during this period, she does not—either explicitly or implicitly—intend to retract the charge of radical evil but to reflect in order to examine whether or not such radical evil is likely to recur under the post-war global order. She finds that it is likely, but not inevitable.

Arendt has also been praised for being among the first to point out that intellectuals, such as Eichmann and other leaders of the Einsatzgruppen, were in fact more accepted in the Third Reich despite Nazi Germany's persistent use of anti-intellectual propaganda. During a 2013 review of historian Christian Ingrao's book Believe and Destroy, which pointed out that Hitler was more accepting of intellectuals with German ancestry and that at least 80 German intellectuals assisted his "SS War Machine," Los Angeles Review of Books journalist Jan Mieszkowski praised Arendt for being "well aware that there was a place for the thinking man in the Third Reich." Several political commentators and historians of Trump's presidency rely heavily on Arendt's conceptions—including the tendencies that she outlines in Eichmann in Jerusalem—to underscore their arguments in a vocation of resistance to the encroachments of racism and totalitarianism.

== See also ==
- Hannah Arendt (film), a biographic film about the writing of the report
- Little Eichmanns
- Milgram experiment (obedience to authority, 1961)
- Moral disengagement
- Stanford prison experiment (Zimbardo, 1972)
- Superior orders

== Bibliography ==
- Arendt, Hannah (2006) [1963, Viking Press, revised 1968]. Eichmann in Jerusalem: A Report on the Banality of Evil. Penguin Publishing Group. ISBN 978-1-101-00716-7. Full text: 1964 edition
- Azoulay, Ariella; Honig, Bonnie (May 2016). "Between Nuremberg and Jerusalem: Hannah Arendt's Tikkun Olam". differences: A Journal of Feminist Cultural Studies. 27 (1). Duke University Press: 48–93. doi:10.1215/10407391-3522757.
- Cesarani, David (2006). Becoming Eichmann: Rethinking the Life, Crimes and Trial of a "Desk Murderer". Cambridge, MA: Da Capo Press. ISBN 9780306814761.
- Lozowick, Yaacov (Apr 5, 2011). Hannah Arendt, Adolf Eichmann, and how Evil Isn't Banal. The Holocaust Resource Center (video). Jerusalem: Yad Vashem. The World Holocaust Remembrance Center. Archived from the original on 2021-12-21.
- Stangneth, Bettina (2014). Eichmann Before Jerusalem: The Unexamined Life of a Mass Murderer. Knopf Doubleday Publishing Group. ISBN 978-0-307-95968-3.
- Jochen von Lang, Eichmann Interrogated (1982) ISBN 0-88619-017-7 — a book referenced in Eichmann in Jerusalem which contains excerpts from Eichmann's pre-trial interrogation
- "Hannah Arendt Latest Articles". The New Yorker.
- "Abstracts from Eichmann in Jerusalem with links to articles". The New Yorker.
