= Hans Globke =

German politician (1898–1973)

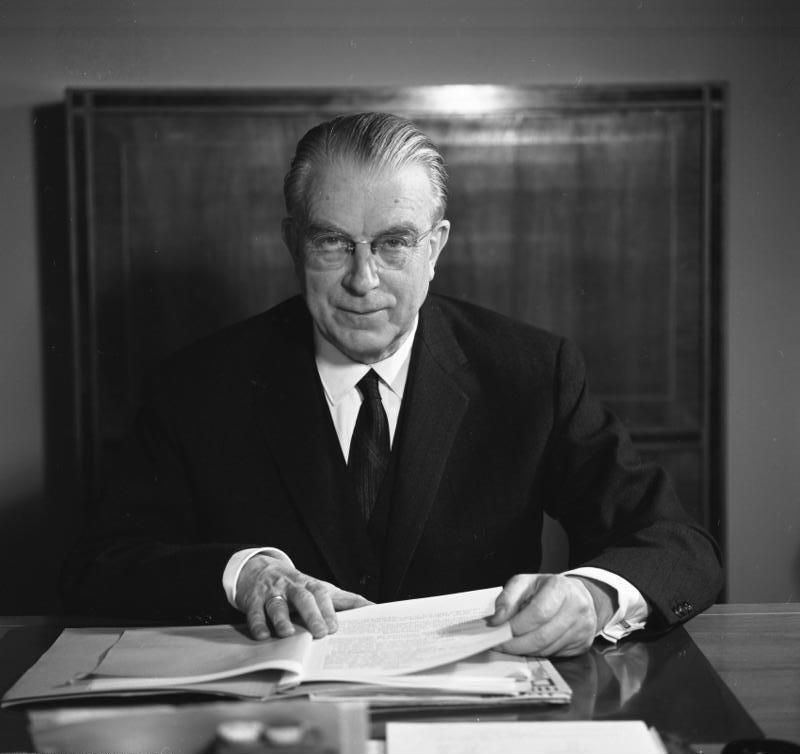
- Globke in 1963

German Chancellery Chief of Staff
- In office 28 October 1953 – 15 October 1963
- Chancellor: Konrad Adenauer
- Preceded by: Otto Lenz
- Succeeded by: Ludger Westrick

Personal details
- Born: Hans Josef Maria Globke; 10 September 1898 Düsseldorf, Rhine Province, Kingdom of Prussia, German Empire
- Died: 13 February 1973 (aged 74) Bonn, West Germany
- Party: CDU
- Spouse: Augusta Vaillant
- Occupation: Lawyer, politician
- Known for: Advisor to Konrad Adenauer

Hans Josef Maria Globke (10 September 1898 – 13 February 1973) was a high-ranking German civil servant and lawyer who played a central role in both the Nazi regime and the early West German government. While not himself a member of the Nazi party (his application was rejected), he was one of the regime's most influential civil servants.

Globke worked in the Prussian and Reich Ministry of the Interior in the Reich, under the Weimar Republic and Nazism. Later, he was the Under-Secretary of State and Chief of Staff of the German Chancellery in West Germany from 28 October 1953 to 15 October 1963 under Chancellor Konrad Adenauer. He is the most prominent example of the continuity of the administrative elites between Nazi Germany and the early West Germany.

In 1936, Globke wrote a legal annotation on the antisemitic Nuremberg Race Laws that did not express any objection to the discrimination against Jews, placing the Nazi Party on a firmer legal ground and setting the path to the Holocaust during World War II. By 1938, Globke had been promoted to Ministerialdirigent in the Office for Jewish Affairs in the Ministry of the Interior, where he produced the Name Change Ordinance, a law that forced Jewish men to take the middle name Israel and Jewish women Sara for easier identification. In 1941, during the Nazi period, he issued another statute that stripped Jews in occupied territories of their statehood and possessions. Globke was identified as the author of an interior ministry report from France, written in racist language, that complained of "coloured blood into Europe" and called for the "elimination" of its "influences" on the gene pool.

Globke later had a controversial career as Secretary of State and Chief of Staff of the West German Chancellery. A strident anti-communist, Globke became a powerful éminence grise of the West German government, and was widely regarded as one of the most influential public officials in the government of Chancellor Konrad Adenauer. Globke had a major role in shaping the course and structure of the state and West Germany's alignment with the United States. He was also an important figure in West Germany's anti-communist policies at the domestic and international level and in the Western intelligence community, and was the German government's main liaison with NATO and other Western intelligence services, especially the Central Intelligence Agency (CIA).

== Early life and education ==
Globke was born in Düsseldorf, Rhine Province, the son of the cloth wholesaler Josef Globke and his wife Sophie (née Erberich), both Roman Catholics and supporters of the Centre Party (Deutsche Zentrumspartei). Shortly after Hans's birth, the family moved to Aachen, where his father opened a draper's shop. When he finished his secondary education at the elite Catholic Kaiser-Karl-Gymnasium and completing his Abitur in 1916, he was drafted, serving until the end of World War I in an artillery unit on the Western Front. After World War I, he studied law and political science at the University of Bonn, University of Cologne and the University of Giessen. In 1921, Globke became a legal trainee when he passed the state examination (German: Referendarexamen) at the Higher Regional Court of Cologne. For a year he worked as a trainee in Eschweiler, Cologne and Berlin. In 1922, Globke qualified as a doctor of law (Dr. jur.) at the University of Giessen, with a dissertation titled The immunity of the members of the Reichstag and the Landtag (German: Die Immunität der Mitglieder des Reichstages und der Landtage). In the same year, his father died and Globke became the main wage-earner for the family.

While studying, Globke, a practising Catholic, joined the Bonn chapter of the Cartellverband (KdStV), the German Catholic Students' Federation. His close contacts with fellow KdStV members and his membership from 1922 in the Catholic Centre Party played a significant role in his later political life. Globke finished his Assessorexamen in 1924 and briefly served as a judge in the Aachen district court. He became vice police-chief of Aachen in 1925 and governmental civil servant with a rank of Regierungsassessor (District Assessor) in 1926.

In 1934, he married Augusta Vaillant, with whom he had two sons and one daughter.

== Ministerial career ==
Hans Globke's Reich Citizenship Law on 15 September 1935. It includes the Law for the protection of German blood and German honor as well as the Law for the protection of the hereditary health of the German people.

In December 1929, Globke entered the Higher Civil Service at the lowest rank of Government Counciller Regierungsrat in the Prussian Ministry of the Interior. There he worked in areas like Standesamt, right to a name, demilitarisation of the Rhineland and questions related to the Treaty of Versailles.

Globke was not affected by the personnel purges of the Prussian ministerial bureaucracy by the Franz von Papen government, which removed republican-oriented officials after the coup d'état in Prussia on 20 July 1932. On the contrary, on 12 August 1932, he was appointed head of the constitutional department in Department I. This department also included the civil status department, which was responsible for regulating name change matters. In October 1932, under Globke's leadership, a set of rules, known as the "Ordinance on the Responsibility for Changing Surnames and First Names of 21 November 1932" (German: Verordnung über die Zuständigkeit zur Änderung von Familiennamen und Vornamen vom 21. November 1932) were created. The rule made it harder for Germans of Jewish ancestry in Prussia to change their last names to less obviously Jewish names, followed by guidelines for their implementation in December 1932.

This ordinance tied in with the restrictive principles for the treatment of Jewish name changes formulated in the Prussian Ministry of the Interior in 1909 and 1921, but now placed these changes openly in the context of an anti-Jewish attitude. In the circular issued by Globke on naming rights, it was said that every name change impairs "the recognisability of origin from a family", facilitates "the obscuration of marital status" and conceals "the blood descent".

This unequal treatment of the Jews in the final phase of the Weimar Republic, in which Globke played a major role, is considered by researchers and in the earlier case law of East Germany to be a precursor to name-related discrimination during the early Nazi era. For the historian Manfred Görtemaker and the criminal lawyer Christoph Safferling, Globke "was therefore one of the pioneers of later racial legislation as early as the Weimar Republic."

== Career during Nazism ==
After the seizure of power by the Nazi Party in early 1933, Globke was involved in the drafting of a series of laws aimed at the co-ordination (German: Gleichschaltung) of the legal system of Prussia with the Reich. Globke helped to formulate the Enabling Act of 23 March 1933, which effectively gave Adolf Hitler dictatorial powers. He was also the author of the law of 10 July 1933 concerning the dissolution of the existing Prussian State Council and the formation of the revised Council, as well as of further legislation that co-ordinated all Prussian parliamentary bodies.

In December 1933 Globke was promoted to Oberregierungsrat (Senior Government Councilor), which Globke later said had been postponed due to his doubts over the legality of the so-called Prussian coup of 1932, which was well known in the Ministry. On 1 November 1934, following the unification of the Prussian Ministry of the Interior with the Reich Ministry of the Interior, Globke took a position as a Referent (Consultant) in the newly formed Reich and Prussian Ministry of the Interior under Reich Interior Minister Wilhelm Frick, where he worked until 1945. In July 1938, Globke received his final promotion of the Nazi period, to Ministerialrat (Ministerial Councilor).

=== Measures to exclude and persecute Jews ===
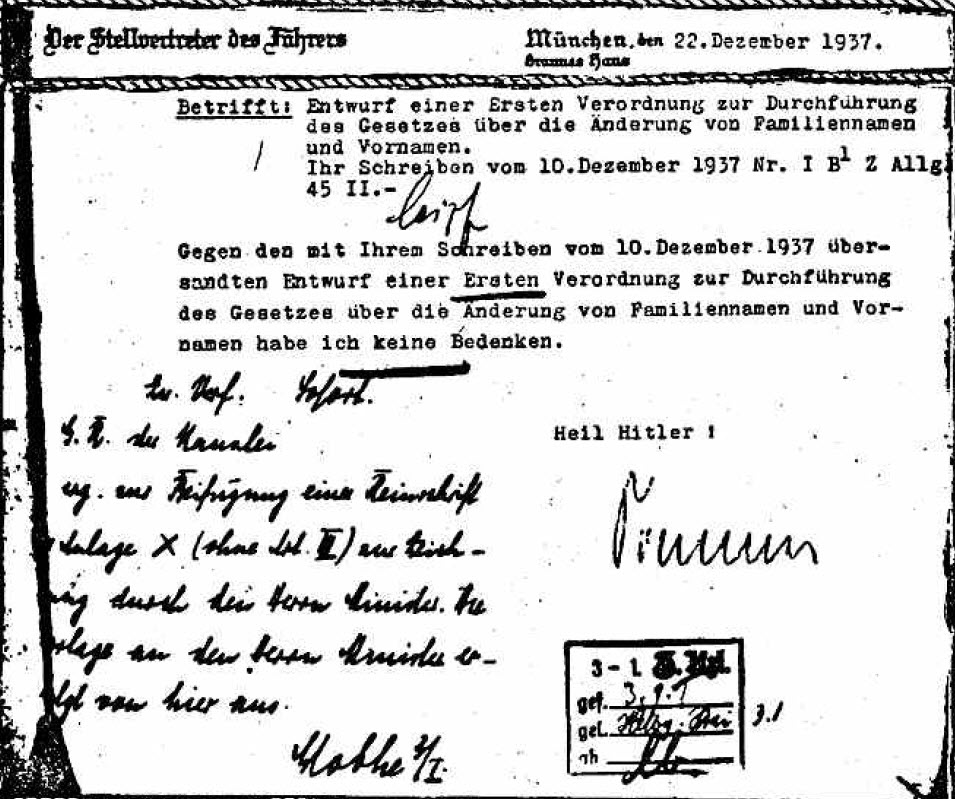
Globke's draft anti-Jewish law on the modification of family names of released on 10 December 1937

From 1934 onwards, Globke continued to be responsible mainly for name changes and civil status issues; from 1937, international issues in the field of citizenship and option contracts were added to his brief. As a co-supervisor, he also dealt with "general race issues", immigration and emigration, and matters related to the anti-Semitic "Blood Protection Act" (German: Rassenschande) laws covering sexual relations between Aryans and non-Aryans. He co-authored the official legal commentary on the new Reich Citizenship Law, one of the Nuremberg Laws introduced at the Nazi Party Congress in September 1935, which revoked the citizenship of German Jews, as well as various legal regulations. Globke's work also included the elaboration of templates and drafts for laws and ordinances. In this context, he had a leading role in the preparation of the first Ordinance on the Reich's civil law (enacted on 14 November 1935), The Law for the Defense of German Blood and Honour (enacted 18 October 1935), and the Civil Status Act (enacted on 3 November 1937). The "J" which was imprinted in the passports of Jews was designed by Globke.

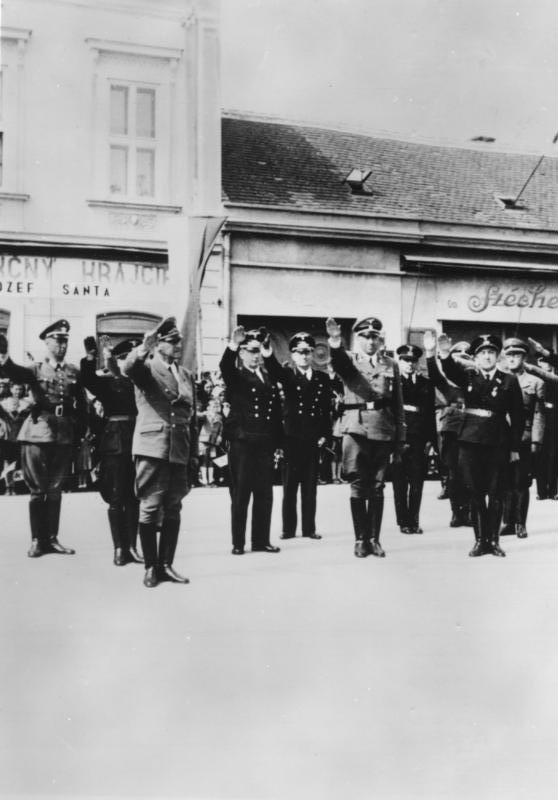
Globke, Wilhelm Frick and Wilhelm Stuckart performing Nazi salute, 1941

Globke was responsible for preparing legal commentaries and explanations for his areas of responsibility. In 1936, together with his superior, State Secretary Wilhelm Stuckart, he published the first commentary on the Nuremberg Laws and their implementing regulations. This proved to be particularly influential for the interpretation of the Nuremberg Laws because it was given an official character. Originally, Globke was only supposed to comment on matrimonial issues as Stuckart wanted to do the rest of the work himself, but Stuckart became ill for a long time, so Globke wrote the commentary on his own. Stuckart ended up only writing the extensive introduction. In this context, Globke's later defense lawyers pointed out that he was not to be held responsible for Stuckart's racist choice of words and that his commentary on the law interpreted the Nuremberg Laws narrowly in comparison to later comments. In individual cases, especially in the case of so-called mixed marriages, this has proven to be beneficial for those affected.

Globke also authored the Law on Changing Surnames and First Names (enacted 5 January 1938), the Name Change Ordinance (enacted 17 August 1938), and the associated implementing ordinances. According to the ordinances, Jews who did not bear any of the given names in an attached list were required to add a middle name to their own: "Sara" for women and "Israel" for men. The list of male first names began with Abel, Abiezer, Abimelech, Abner, Absalom, Ahab, Ahaziah, Ahasuerus, and so on. Some of the names on the list were fictitious or selected in a controversial manner. It is unclear whether this was due to an intention to further disparage Jews, or whether they were errors and inaccuracies. Insofar as they were particularly widespread among German Jews at the time, even the names of Christian saints were included on this list, e.g. B. "Isidor", the name of the theologian Isidor of Seville or Saint Isidor of Madrid, the patron of many southern German village churches. By registering the population regarded as Jewish, Globke created the administrative prerequisites that facilitated to a great extent the rounding up and deportation of Jews during the Holocaust that, began at the end of 1941.

Globke also served as chief legal adviser to the Office for Jewish Affairs in the Ministry of Interior, headed by Adolf Eichmann, that performed the bureaucratic implementation of the Holocaust.

In 1938, Globke was appointed Ministerialrat (Ministerial Councilor) for his "extraordinary efforts in drafting the law for the Protection of the German Blood". On 25 April 1938, Globke was praised by the Reich Interior Minister Wilhelm Frick as "the most capable and efficient official in my ministry" when it came to drafting anti-Semitic laws.

=== During the war ===
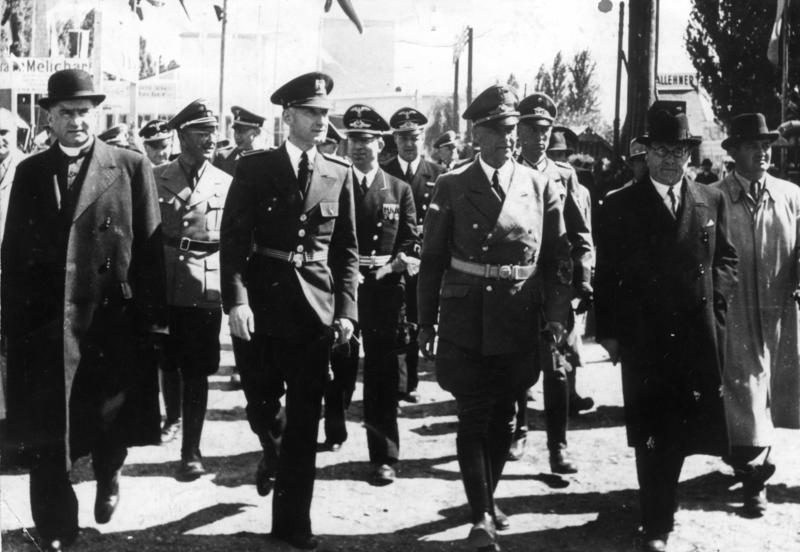
Globke and Reich Interior Minister Wilhelm Frick in Bratislava, Slovak State, September 1941

At the beginning of the war, Globke was responsible for the new German imperial borders in the West that were the responsibility of the Reich Ministry of the Interior. He made several trips to the conquered territories. The historian Peter Schöttler suspected that Globke was probably the author of a memorandum to Hitler in June 1940 discussing the idea of State Secretary Stuckart proposing a far-reaching annexation of the East French and Belgian territories, which would have involved the deportation of about 5 million people.

He applied for membership of the Nazi Party for career reasons in 1940, but the application was rejected on 24 October 1940 by Martin Bormann, reportedly because of his former membership of the Centre Party, which had represented Roman Catholic voters in Weimar Germany. Globke was ultimately rejected for membership by Bormann in 1943.

At the beginning of September 1941, Globke accompanied Interior Minister Frick and State Secretary Stuckart on an official visit to Slovakia, which at that time was a client state of the German Reich. Immediately following this visit, the government of Slovakia announced the introduction of the so-called Jewish Code, which provided the legal basis for the later expropriations and deportations of Slovak Jews. In 1961, Globke denied there was any connection between the two events and the allegation that he had participated in the creation of the Code. Clear evidence for it was never verified. According to CIA documents, Globke was possibly also responsible for the deportation of 20,000 Jews from Northern Greece to Nazi extermination camps in Poland.

Globke submitted a final application for Nazi Party membership, but the application was rejected in 1943, again due to his former affiliation to the Centre Party.

On the other hand, Globke maintained contacts with military and civilian resistance groups. He was the informant of the Berlin Bishop Konrad von Preysing and had knowledge of the coup preparations by the opponents of Hitler Carl Friedrich Goerdeler and Ludwig Beck. According to reports by Jakob Kaiser and Otto Lenz, in the event that the attempt to overthrow the National Socialist regime had succeeded, Globke was earmarked for a senior ministerial post in an imperial government formed by Goerdeler. However, no evidence ever emerged to support Globke's later assertion that the National Socialists wanted to arrest him in 1945, but were prevented by the advance of the Allies.

== Post-war period ==
Immediately after the war, his close friend Herbert Engelsing and friends from the Catholic Church helped to promote Globke to the British, ensuring his political survival. Although the British had doubts, the need for Globke's expertise after the war became so great that they were willing to take a chance in employing him in the drafting of election law. Once freed from British obligation on 1 July 1946, he was appointed as the city treasurer in Aachen, a position he held for three years. In August 1946, he was called to testify at the Nuremberg trials. Globke submitted an affidavit to the International Military Tribunal on the annexation of the French territories after the German victory in 1940. The quality and quantity of his testimony, showing he had nothing to hide, helped Globke's reputation.

During the process of denazification, Globke stated that he had been part of the resistance against National Socialism, and was therefore classified by the Arbitration Chamber on 8 September 1947 in Category V: Persons Exonerated.

Globke's second and last appearance at Nuremberg was in August 1948, when he testified at the Wilhelmstraße trial as a witness for both the prosecution and the defence. At trial of his former superior Wilhelm Stuckart, he confirmed that he knew that "Jews were being put to death en masse". He had known at that time that "the extermination of the Jews was systematic", but, he said, restricting his statement, "not that it referred to all Jews".

=== Career in the Adenauer government ===
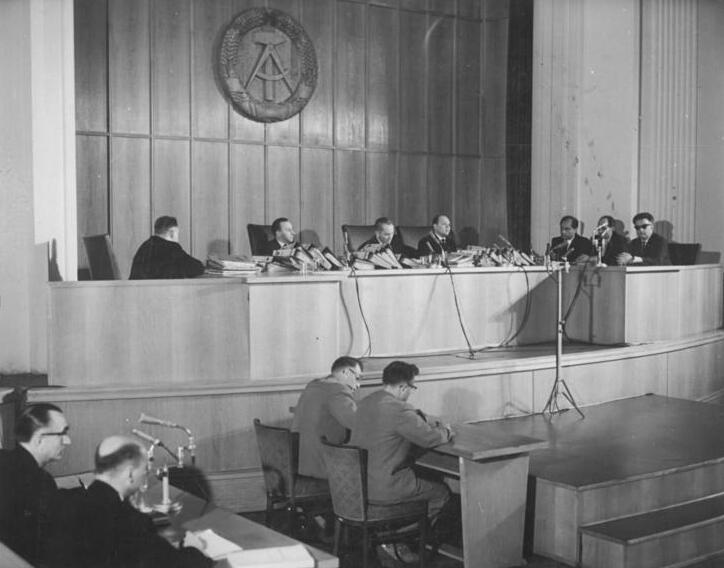
Globke's trial in absentia in East Germany, July 1963

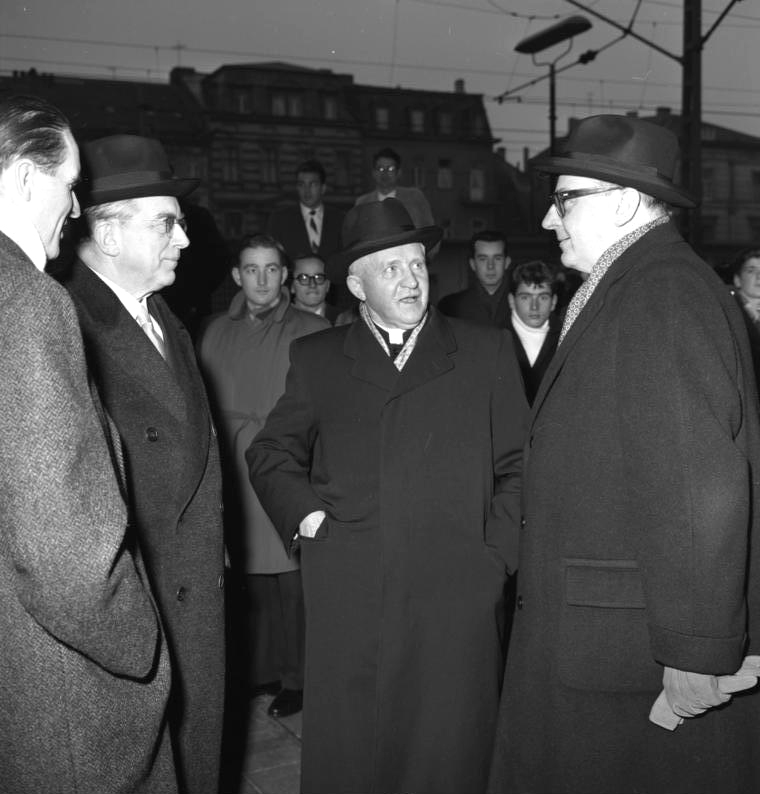
Globke and Bishop Aloisius Joseph Muench, nuncio to post-war West Germany.

In the post-war era Globke rose to become one of the most powerful people in the German government. On 26 September 1949, Konrad Adenauer "had no reservations whatsoever" in appointing Globke to be one of his closest aides, with his appointment to the position of undersecretary at the German Chancellery, despite protests from the opposition parties in the Bundestag and the Central Intelligence Agency. There were three main reasons for this: firstly as Catholics that shared a common environment in their upbringing in the Rhineland, secondly Adenauer considered him an effective and reliable civil servant and thirdly, Globke was absolutely devoted to Adenauer. The appointment of a Nazi official was in itself not unusual; the historian Gunnar Take, from the Institute of Contemporary History in Munich, established that only three out of 50 officials of the interior ministry who were of working age during the Nazi era had been anti-fascists.

In 1951, he issued a statute that restored back pay, pensions, and advancement to civil servants who had served under the Nazi regime, including himself. John Le Carré wrote that these were "rights as they would have enjoyed if the Second World War hadn't taken place, or if Germany had won it. In a word, they would be entitled to whatever promotion would have come their way had their careers proceeded without the inconvenience of an Allied victory". At the end of October 1953, following Otto Lenz's election to the Bundestag in the election of the previous month, Globke succeeded Lenz as Secretary of State at the Federal Chancellery, wielding a great deal of power behind the scenes and therefore an important pillar of Konrad Adenauer's "chancellor democracy" (German: Kanzlerdemokratie).

=== Secretary of state ===
Globke served as Secretary of State ("Staatssekretär") of the Chancellery from 1953 to 1963. As such he was one of the closest aides to Chancellor Adenauer, with significant influence over government policy. He advised Adenauer on political decisions during joint walks in the garden of the Chancellor's office, such as the reparations agreement with Israel. His areas of responsibility and his closeness to the Chancellor arguably made him one of the most powerful members of the government; he was responsible for running the Chancellery, recommending the people who were appointed to roles in the government, coordinating the government's work, for the establishment and oversight of the West German intelligence service and for all matters of national security. He was the German government's main liaison with NATO and other western intelligence services, especially the CIA. He also maintained contact with the party apparatus and became "a kind of hidden secretary general" to the Christian Democratic Union (CDU), and contact with the Chancellor usually had to go through him. As Adenauer and everyone else knew of his previous career, the Chancellor could be assured of his absolute loyalty.

Globke's key position as chief of staff to Adenauer, responsible for matters of national security, made both the West German government and CIA officials wary of exposing his past, despite their full knowledge of it. This led, for instance, to the withholding of Adolf Eichmann's alias from the Israeli government and Nazi hunters in the late 1950s, and CIA pressure in 1960 on Life magazine to delete references to Globke from its recently obtained Eichmann memoirs.

According to CIA documents, in the 1961 election campaign against Willy Brandt (who was later elected Chancellor in 1969), Globke offered Brandt a brazen deal not to make allegations of treason against him resulting from his time in exile, a campaign topic, provided that the SPD would not use Globke's Nazi past as an election topic. Globke threatened Brandt with a new campaign against him, initiated by the communists. However, Globke believed that it was in the national interest to stop the campaigns and the continual aspersions about the past would stop the population finding peace. Brandt decided not make Globke's Nazi past a campaign issue.

Globke left office together with the Adenauer administration in 1963, and was awarded the Grand Cross of the Order of Merit of the Federal Republic of Germany by President Heinrich Lübke. He remained active as an adviser for Adenauer and the CDU during the 1960s.

=== Gehlen organisation ===
In 1950, Globke began working with Reinhard Gehlen, whom Globke considered a close friend with complementary views. An obsessive anti-communist, Gehlen was a former intelligence officer who had held the rank of lieutenant-general in the Heer during World War II. Gehlen was then the director of Foreign Armies East, a military intelligence organisation that operated against the Soviet Union on the Eastern Front. Gehlen had created the Gehlen Organization, known as The Org, in 1946 to spy on the Soviet Union, with approval and funding from the CIA.

In April 1956, on orders from Adenauer, Globke established the Federal Intelligence Service (BND, Bundesnachrichtendienst), the successor organisation to the Gehlen Organisation.

== Nazi past ==
=== Political debate ===
The fact that a man like Globke played a leading role in German politics again shortly after the founding of the Federal Republic triggered a bitter parliamentary debate on 12 July 1950 when Adolf Arndt, then the legal spokesman for the Social Democratic Party (SPD), read an excerpt from the commentaries on the Nuremberg Laws in which Globke discusses whether or not "racial defilement" committed abroad could be punished. Federal Interior Minister Gustav Heinemann (CDU) referred in his answer to the exonerating testimony of the Nuremberg prosecutor Robert Kempner, that Globke had served with his willingness to testify.

Although Globke was controversial because of his Nazi past, Adenauer was loyal to Globke until the end of his term in 1963. On one hand, Adenauer commented on the debate over Globke's participation in the drafting of the Nuremberg race laws with the words "You don't throw away dirty water as long as you don't have clean water" (German: Man schüttet kein schmutziges Wasser weg, solange man kein sauberes hat). On the other hand, Adenauer stated in a newspaper interview on 25 March 1956 that the claims that Globke was a willing helper of the Nazis lacked any basis. Many people, including some from the ranks of the Catholic Church, certified that Globke had repeatedly campaigned on behalf of persecuted people.

In the opinion of the journalist Harald Jähner, Globke's continued presence led to "disgraceful state measures to prevent criminal prosecution and obstruction of justice" and repeatedly offered the GDR a welcome opportunity to describe the Federal Republic as "fascist". This was especially true after 1960, when the Israeli intelligence service Mossad tracked Adolf Eichmann down in Argentina; thus, loyalty to Globke increasingly proved to be a burden on Adenauer's government. The German Federal Intelligence Service (BND) had known since 1952 that Eichmann was living in Buenos Aires and working at Mercedes-Benz.

Whether Globke knew of Adolf Eichmann's whereabouts in Argentina at the end of the 1950s was still the subject of political debate in May 2013 when the parliamentary group Alliance 90/The Greens asked the Bundestag for clarification of their relationship and the Federal Intelligence Service to Eichmann. The Bundestag was unable to answer it.

=== West German investigation ===
The former administrative officer of Army Group E in Thessaloniki, Max Merten, had accused Globke of being heavily responsible for the Holocaust in Greece, as he could have prevented the deaths of 20,000 Jews in Thessaloniki when Eichmann contacted the Reich Interior Ministry and asked for Globke's permission to kill them. When these accusations became known, they prompted preliminary criminal proceedings to be initiated against Globke by Fritz Bauer, the chief public prosecutor of Hesse. The investigation was transferred to the public prosecutor's office in Bonn in May 1961 after an intervention by Adenauer, where it was closed due to lack of evidence.

=== Trial in East Berlin ===
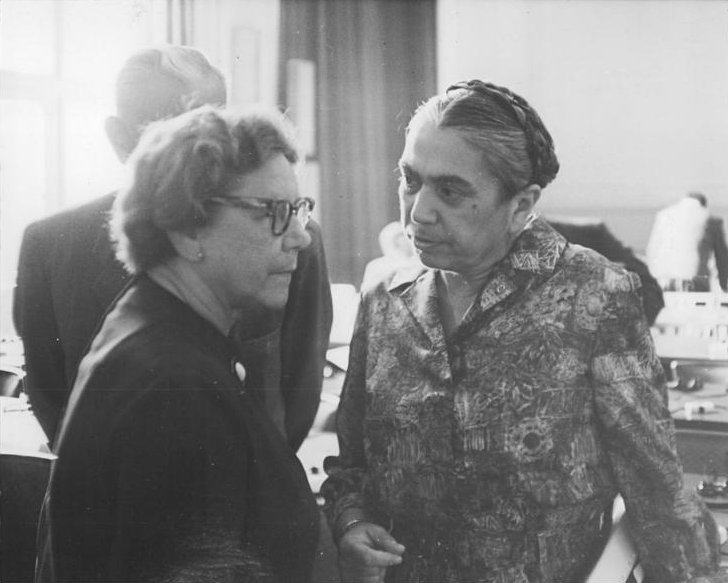
Hilde Benjamin (right) and Friedel Malter watch the second day of the Globke trial against Hans Globke

In the early 1960s, there was a vigorous campaign in East Germany, led by the Politburo member Albert Norden of the Ministry of State Security, against the so-called "author of the Nuremberg Blood Laws" as well an "agitator and organiser of the persecutions of the Jews". Norden's goal was to prove that Globke was in contact with Eichmann. In a 1961 memorandum, Norden stated that "in collaboration with Erich Mielke, certain materials should be procured or produced. We definitely need a document that somehow proves Eichmann's direct cooperation with Globke".

In July 1963, the trial, a show trial, was held in the Supreme Court of East Germany which was presided over by Heinrich Toeplitz. Because an extradition of Globke to the East was unrealistic, the trial was not held with the expectation of holding Globke accountable for his crimes. It nonetheless still had propaganda value in publicizing his role in the Nazi era and in drawing attention to the continuity between the Federal Republic and the Nazi regime, in contrast to the self-styled antifascist image of the Democratic Republic. On 23 July 1963, Globke was sentenced in absentia, to life imprisonment "for continued war crimes committed with complicity and crimes against humanity in partial combination with murder". In the trial and in the extensive reasons for the verdict, the court tried to prove the alleged "similarity of essence of the Bonn regime" with Hitler's terror state.

However, such East German trials were not recognised outside of the Soviet bloc, least of all by West Germany. On 10 July 1963, the affair was denounced by the West German government as a show trial. The fact that much of the criticism of Globke came from the Soviet bloc, and that it mixed genuine information with false accusations, made it easier for the West Germans and the Americans to dismiss it as communist propaganda.

== Retirement ==
After his retirement, Globke decided to move to Switzerland, where his wife Augusta had bought a property in Chardonne VD on Lake Geneva in 1957 and built a holiday home on it. In autumn 1963, however, the parliament of the canton of Vaud declared him an unwanted foreigner and denied him a residence permit. In 1964, he undertook to "sever all spatial and future connections with Switzerland". The Swiss Federal President Ludwig von Moos said before the National Council that "in view of this declaration" the government had "refrained from issuing an entry ban".

== Death ==
Globke died after a serious illness at his home on 13 February 1973. He was buried in the central cemetery of Bad Godesberg in Plittersdorf in Bonn.

== Scholarly investigation ==
=== Bertelsmann ===
In 1961 the civil activist Reinhard Strecker wrote, Hans Globke – File Extracts, documents based on Strecker's research in Polish and Czech archives, which was published by the Bertelsmann affiliate Rütten & Loening. The book consisted of a collection of legal files, images and newspaper reports that had been collected by Strecker from Nazi archives. The collection proved that Globke had helped to draft several anti-semitic laws during the early 1930s, years before Adolf Hitler had come to power and had later become one of Eichmann's most important functionaries. During his trial, Eichmann was given the book by his lawyer Robert Servatius and had written 40 pages of commentaries on 15 December 1961 that detailed his relationship to himself and tried to prove that Globke had more authority than he did while downplaying his role.

Since January 2021, a historical copy of the original edition from Rütten & Loening Verlag, Hamburg, has been available online under the title Dr. Hans Globke. File extracts, documents. Edited by Reinhard-M. Strecker. It is part of the new dossier Desk Criminal Globke (Schreibtischtäter Globk), which the internet based open-knowledge charity FragDenStaat published on 22 January 2021. The dossier on the Nazi past of the head of the Chancellery also includes Globke's two-volume personnel file as well as his salary file from the Federal Archives, which FragDenStaat says it is making publicly available for the first time.

The naming of Globke by Eichmann was highly undesirable for the West German Government. Globke attempted to block further publication of the book in court with an interim injunction. The BND, under the leadership of Gehlen, spent 50,000 marks trying to take the book off the market. When a court then discovered two minor mistakes (the publisher had caused one of them by abbreviation), it imposed a restraining order and Bertelsmann came to the decision to cancel the new edition of the book. The government is thought by historians to have threatened Bertelsmann by informing them that no official agency would have acquired any book from the publisher again.

=== Adolf Eichmann ===
In June 2006, it was announced that the Adenauer Government had informed the CIA of the location of Adolf Eichmann in March 1958. However, according to US historian Timothy Naftali, through contacts at the highest level, it had also ensured that the CIA did not use that knowledge. Neither the federal government nor the CIA passed the new information on to the Israeli government. Naftali suggested that Adenauer had wanted to prevent pressure on Globke. When Eichmann was captured and taken to be tried in Israel, made possible by an unofficial tip-off by the Hessian Attorney General Fritz Bauer, Adenauer sent the German-Jewish journalist Rolf Vogel as an emissary, to influence the Eichmann trial in Jerusalem, in one of the most sensitive diplomatic and intelligence operations of West Germany. The fact that Vogel was specially commissioned into the BND provides an indication of the sensitivity of the operation. Vogel met with David Ben-Gurion to present a letter from Adenauer. Ben-Gurion informed Vogel that of the hundred names that Eichmann was queried on, Globke's was not mentioned. Vogel immediately returned to Germany and contacted Adenauer to confirm that Globke was in the clear.

Eichmann had previously given extensive interviews on his life to Dutch journalist and former SS agent Willem Sassen, on which his memoirs were to be based. From 1957, Sassen's attempts to sell this material to US magazine Life had been unsuccessful. This changed with the spectacular kidnapping of Eichmann by Mossad in May 1960 and the preparation of the Eichmann trial in Israel. Life published extracts from Sassen's material about Eichmann in two articles, on 28 November and 5 December 1960. His family wanted to use the royalties from the articles to fund his defence in court. However the federal government, already worried about the campaign in East Berlin, contacted the CIA to ensure that any material regarding Globke was removed from the Life coverage. In an internal memo dated 20 September 1960, CIA chief Allen Dulles mentioned "a vague mention of Globke, which Life omits at our demand".

In April 2011, the Globke Eichmann Trial affair was again visited when the German weekly news magazine Der Spiegel and affiliates published a series of articles on research in the German Intelligence Service that had previously been unpublished. The Der Spiegel research examined a memorandum issued on 16 March 1962, that described Gehlen requesting that measures be taken to stop Globke being called as a witness. On 22 March 1962, Eichmann's defense attorney Robert Servatius asked for Globke as a witness at the trial but the request was rejected by the court. German defence minister Franz Josef Strauss wrote at the time "The Israelis have prevented extreme incitement against us". An Israeli government memo from 26 April 1961 states that Gideon Hausner, at the time the Attorney General, had informed ministers of the request and Servatius was asked if Globke was really needed and he thought about it and decided not to call him.

=== Globke's estate ===
In 2009, the historian Erik Lommatzsch published a monograph detailing his investigation of the Globke's estate, that is kept in the archive of the Konrad Adenauer Foundation. However, Globke's actual relationship to Nazism and his influence on the government of Adenauer are not really clarified, which, according to reviewer Hans-Heinrich Jansen, is not conclusively possible, "in view of the sourcing, which for many central issues, turned out to be slim, after all". The background of the Stasi campaign against Globke remains largely unknown; however, this aspect of Lommatzsch's biography was in any case only intended as a digression, since it requires separate treatment. However, Lommatzsch mentions a number of examples of Globke campaigning for the persecuted, his commentary on the Nuremberg Laws was aimed at defusing the regulations, and he had not played the dominant role in the postwar period the Adenauer opponents had assumed.

=== Research into Gehlen organisation ===
In 2011, the German historian Klaus-Dietmar Henke began research into the Federal Intelligence Service archives, the successor organisation to The Org, and concluded that Gehlen, under the cloak of anti-communist activities, had been supplying Globke with briefings on a wide range of domestic German targets. Henke discovered that Gehlen methodically collected intelligence on senior members of the Social Democratic Party (SPD), the Fourth Estate, other intelligence agencies, Nazi victims associations and members of the nobility and the church. In the early years of the German Federal Republic, it was important for Adenauer and Globke to be fully aware of the activities of the opposition. Globke and Gehlen met daily and developed a successful symbiotic relationship, that ensured Adenauer remained in power. According to Henke, the organisation "was able to work, in effect, fully under the radar. And in effect, it was an instrument for keeping a stranglehold on power and a personal tool for Globke". Globke and Gehlen used the organisation's network to have unfriendly journalists removed from their posts, place propaganda in more friendly newspapers, and acquire information that could be used against Globke and Adenauer's rivals. In 1960, the organisation provided a briefing to Globke on the SPD politician and future Chancellor of Germany Willy Brandt that stated:

"This pig has things on his record from his time in the safety of western exile and with the Red Orchestra that could bring him down at any point of our choosing. We've got the material, but we have time, too."

=== Complicit in the system ===
The historian Wolfgang Benz judges that Globke was "not a National Socialist and not an anti-Semite", but "functioned in the interests of the Nazi regime and made himself complicit in the system of persecution of the Jews through competent participation".

== Awards and honours ==
=== Before 1945 ===
- Honor Cross for Front Fighters (1934)
- Medal commemorating the 13th of March 1938 (1938)
- Sudetenland Medal (1939)
- Silver Loyalty Merit Sign (1941)
- War Merit Cross 2nd Class (1942)
- Commander's Cross of the Order of the Star of Romania (1942)

=== After 1945 ===
- Grand Decoration of Honour in Gold with Sash for Services to the Republic of Austria (1956)
- Knight Grand Cross of the Order of Merit of the Italian Republic (1956)
- Grand Cross of the Order of the Oak Crown of the Grand Duchy of Luxembourg (1957)
- Grand Cross of the Order of Christ of Portugal (1960)
- Grand Cross of the Order of Merit of the Federal Republic of Germany (1963)

== Works ==
- Globke, Hans (1922). Die Immunität der Mitglieder des Reichstages und der Landtage. Gießen, Germany: o. O. o. J. OCLC 718905013.
- Stuckart, Wilhelm; Hans Globke (1936). Kommentar zur deutschen Rassengesetzgebung. Munich, Germany: C. H. Beck. OCLC 600714314.

== See also ==
- Theodor Oberländer
- Rudolf von Gersdorff

== Bibliography ==
- M Strecker, Reinhard (1961). Dr. Hans Globke : Aktenauszüge : Dokumente (in German). Hamburg: Rütten & Loening. OCLC 469095729.
- Tetens, T H (1961). The new Germany and the old Nazis. New York: Random House. OCLC 939251662. LCN 61-7240.
- Petty, Terence (2023). Nazis at the Watercooler : War criminals in Postwar German Government Agencies. Potomac Books ISBN 9781640126398

=== Publications ===
- "Der Zusatzvertrag zum deutsch-slowakischen Staatsangehörigkeitsvertrag". Zeitschrift für Osteuropäisches Recht (in German): 278–283. December 1941.
- "Hans Globke Die Staatsangehörigkeit der Volksdeutschen Umsiedler aus Ost- und Südosteuropa". Zeitschrift für Osteuropäisches Recht (in German): 1–26. January 1943.
