= Name Change Ordinance =

1938 antisemitic naming decree in Nazi Germany

The Name Change Ordinance (Namensänderungsverordnung), formally the Second Decree for the Implementation of the Law on the Alteration of Family and Personal Names (Zweite Verordnung zur Durchführung des Gesetzes über die Änderung von Familiennamen und Vornamen), was an antisemitic decree issued in Nazi Germany on 17 August 1938. It required Jews who did not already have a first name on a government list to add the name Israel for men or Sara for women. The additional name had to be reported to civil-registration and police authorities and used in legal and business dealings.

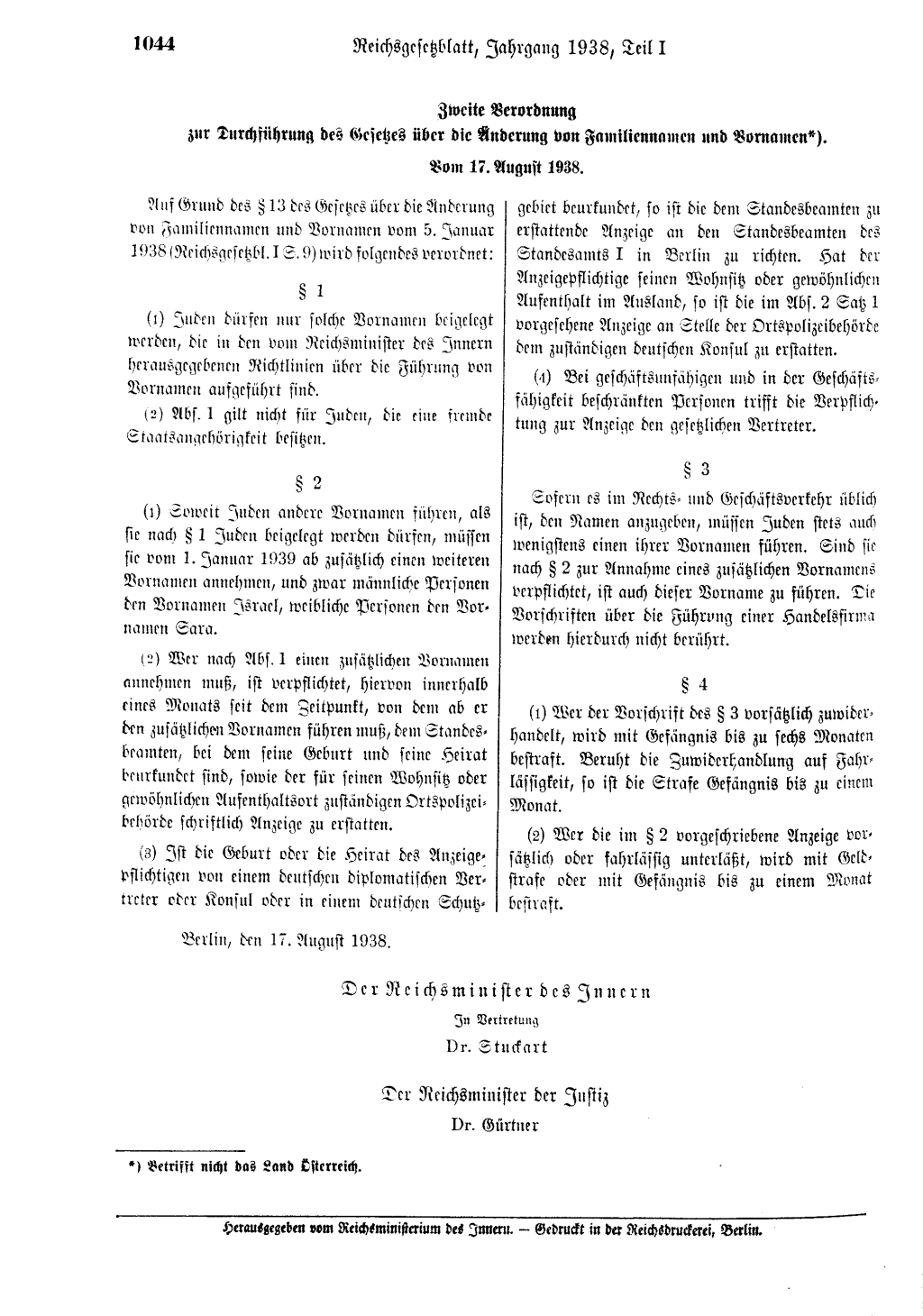
The Name Change Ordinance as published in the Reichsgesetzblatt on 17 August 1938

The ordinance was part of the Nazi government's use of names and official records to identify people classified as Jewish. The original ordinance applied throughout the German Reich except Austria; the naming provisions were extended to Austria and the Sudetenland in 1939. The ordinance was expressly repealed in Germany by the Allied Control Council in September 1945.

== Background ==
Nazi restrictions on name changes preceded the August 1938 ordinance. A November 1937 justification for a proposed national name law stated that the government wanted a uniform system of administrative approval for name changes and sought to make German Jews recognizable by their names. The resulting Law on the Alteration of Family and Personal Names was enacted on 5 January 1938. It allowed the government to revoke some name changes approved before 30 January 1933 and authorized the Interior Ministry to regulate first names.

Robert Rennick attributed much of the Interior Ministry's name policy to civil servant Hans Globke, who had worked on name-change rules before 1933. Rennick wrote that Globke prepared the list of names used with the August 1938 ordinance.

== Provisions ==
The Second Decree was issued on 17 August 1938 under the authority of the January name law. Section 1 provided that Jews could be given only first names contained in guidelines issued by the Reich Minister of the Interior; the rule did not apply to Jews with foreign citizenship.

Section 2 required Jews subject to the decree who had other first names to adopt an additional name from 1 January 1939: Israel for men and Sara for women. Those affected had one month to notify the registrar responsible for their birth and marriage records and the local police authority. German residents abroad were to notify the appropriate German consul in place of the local police. For people who lacked or had limited legal capacity, the reporting duty fell to their legal representative.

Section 3 required Jews to use at least one first name when a name was customarily given in legal or business dealings. A person required to bear Israel or Sara also had to use that additional name. An intentional violation was punishable by up to six months' imprisonment; a negligent violation by up to one month. Failure to report the additional name could be punished by a fine or imprisonment of up to one month. The ordinance was signed by Wilhelm Stuckart, acting for the Reich Minister of the Interior, and Reich Minister of Justice Franz Gürtner.

On 18 August 1938, the Interior Ministry issued its Guidelines on the Use of First Names (Richtlinien über die Führung von Vornamen). The guidelines stated that Jewish German citizens and stateless Jews could be given only names in an attached list and that other German citizens could not be given those names. They also restated the requirement to use Israel or Sara when a person did not already have a listed name. Rennick counted 185 male names and 91 female names in the list and attributed its preparation to Globke.

== Implementation ==
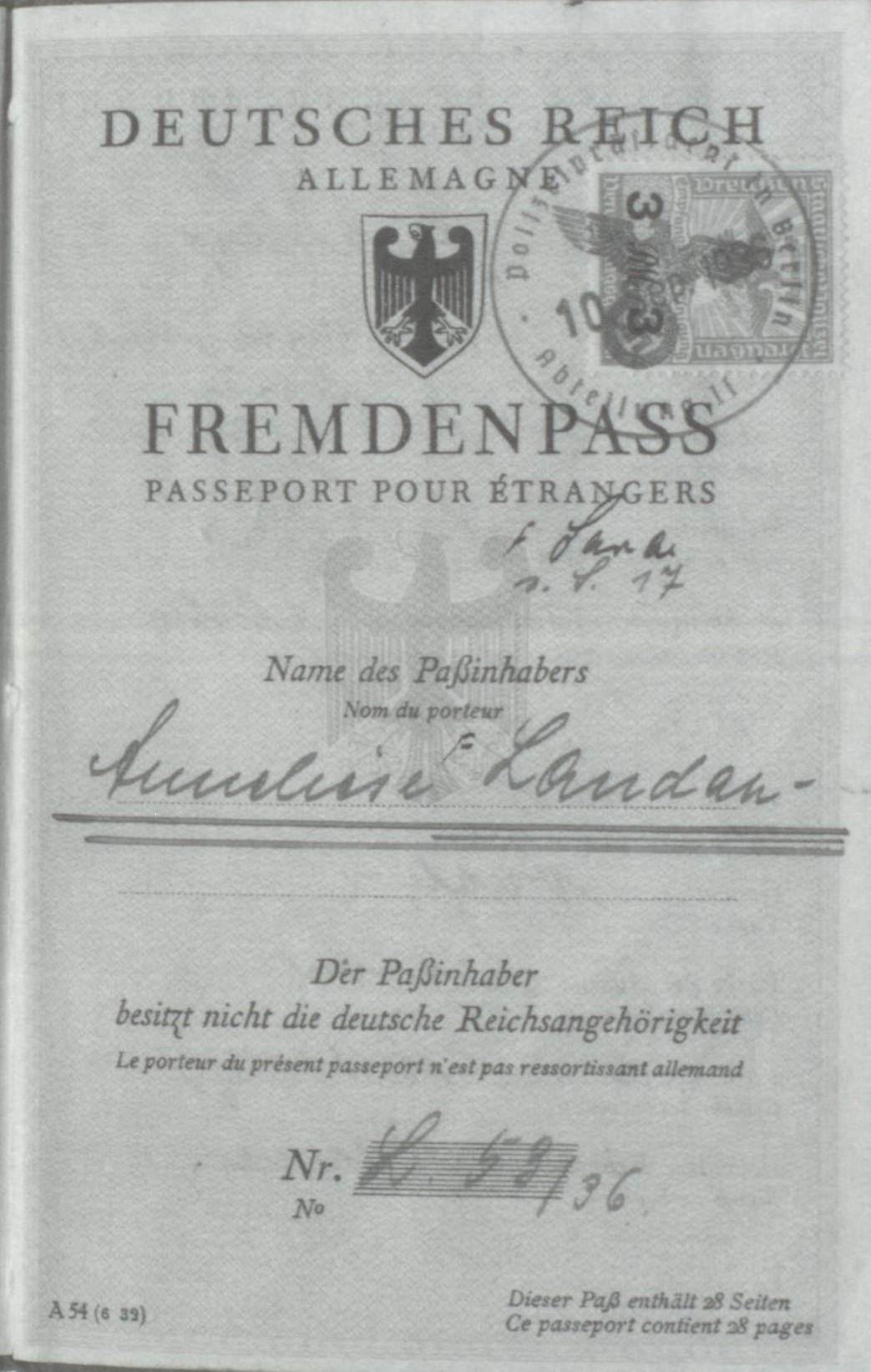
A Fremdenpass issued to Anneliese Landau, with the compulsory additional first name "Sara" subsequently entered

The Interior Ministry's guidelines connected the reporting requirement to police records. When a local police authority received notice that a Jewish person would use Israel or Sara, it was instructed to inform the state police office. If the person had a police criminal record, the criminal police office and criminal register were also to be notified.

Surviving correspondence records how the rule was carried out. On 21 December 1938, Georg and Lillian Friedmann and members of their family sent registered notices to civil registrars in Munich and Berlin and to the local police authority in Schwandorf stating that they would use the additional names required by the ordinance.

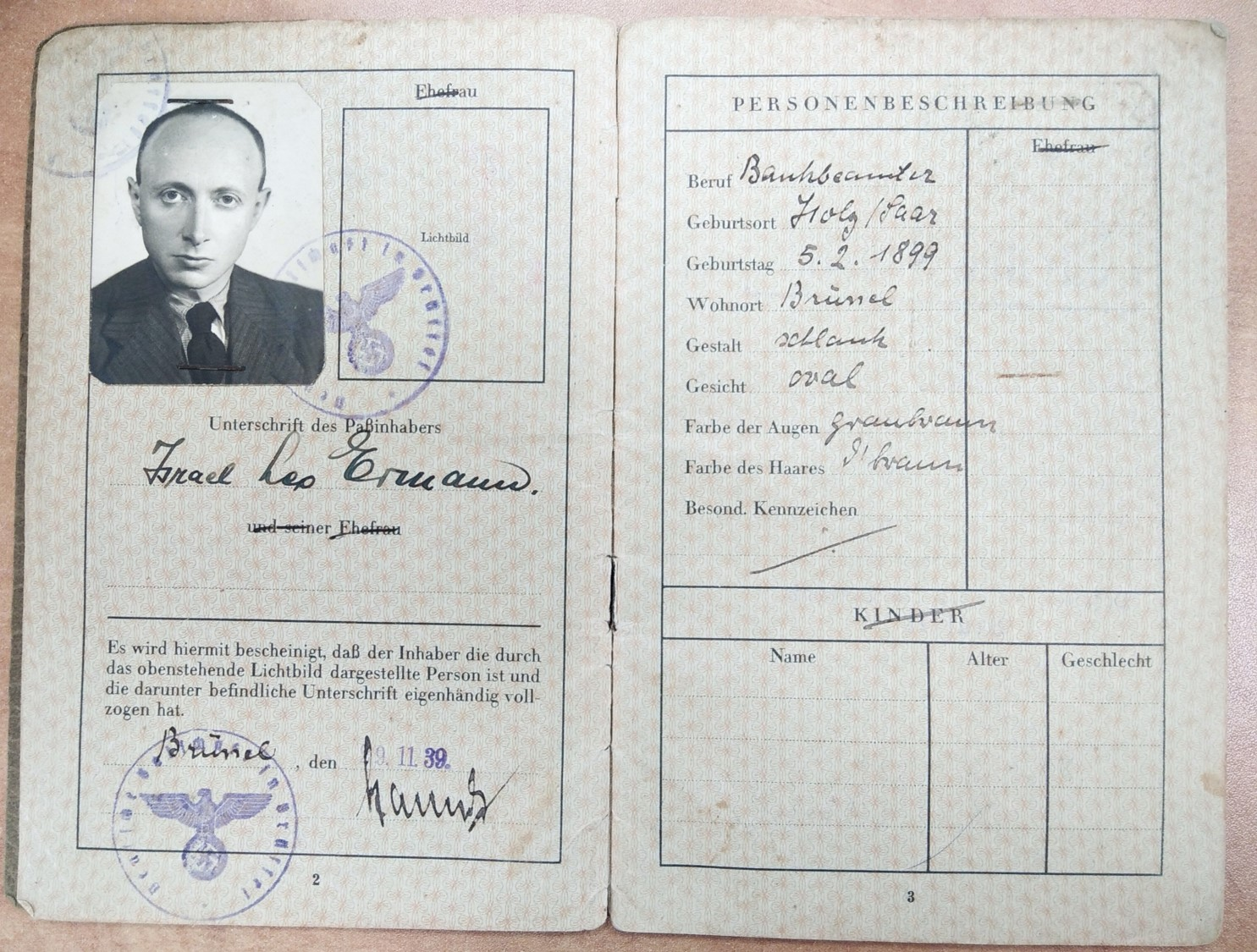
Passport issued to Leo Ermann in 1939 showing the compulsory additional first name "Israel"

Because the additional name had to be used in correspondence and legal and business dealings, it identified the bearer as Jewish in those contexts. The German Federal Agency for Civic Education describes the compulsory naming system as a form of public marking that preceded the 1941 requirement for Jews in the Reich to wear the yellow badge.
