= Lösener =

Lösener or Loesener is a German surname. Notable people of the surname include the following:

- Bernhard Lösener (1890–1952), German lawyer of Third Reich
- Friedrich Leopold Loesener (1834–1903), Germand merchant and shipowner
- Robert Eduard Loesener (1869–1960), Germand merchant and shipowner
- Ludwig Loesener (1865–1941), German botanist
