= Sprachregelung =

German term for prescribed form of official communication

Sprachregelung (German: [ˈʃpʁaːxˌʁeːɡəlʊŋ]) is a German language term meaning "speech code". It refers to a formal or informal agreement, or order, that certain things should be expressed in specific ways in official communications by an organization or by a political entity. It can also cover such concepts as agreed "lines-to-take", talking points, and the exertion of message discipline. An example came in January 1945 when Ribbentrop sent emissaries to contact the Western Allies in Sweden and Switzerland, aiming to negotiate a separate peace; they carried with them a list of Sprachregelungen to ensure they gave the same message.

A certain number of Sprachregelungen are adopted by most mid-sized to large companies in Germany, to avoid confusing and seemingly contradictory messages being given out, and to enhance the outward appearance of unity, but also to avoid negative-sounding statements about the company by replacing them with more or less appropriate euphemisms.

The term is most commonly used in connection with media and politics when it comes to disputed or sensitive subjects. The Cold War period was especially rich in these conventions, especially in the way the two Germanys referred to themselves and each other. For example, during the immediate post-war decades the Federal Republic of Germany did not recognize the German Democratic Republic as a separate state, and so one Sprachregelung adopted over time was that the latter was only to be referred to in quotation marks: even the abbreviated form DDR always appeared as "DDR".

In West Berlin the Sprachregelung required the two parts of the city be referred to as Berlin (West) and Berlin (East), implying that a single city had been occupied and divided. On the other hand, the GDR adopted the Sprachregelung that East Berlin was never to be referred to as such, but always as "Berlin, capital of the GDR", whereas West Berlin was always to be written and pronounced as the single word "Westberlin". This was supposed to avoid recognition of the continuing allied occupation of the whole city of Berlin, and to imply West Berlin had an entirely separate political identity.

Also, euphemisms of Nazi Germany, like "final solution" for what is today known as the Holocaust, have been regarded as a case of Sprachregelung as recounted in Hannah Arendt's coverage of the trial of Eichmann in Jerusalem.

== See also ==
- Message discipline
- Talking point
- Newspeak
