= Hans Pfundtner =

German lawyer and civil servant (1881–1945)

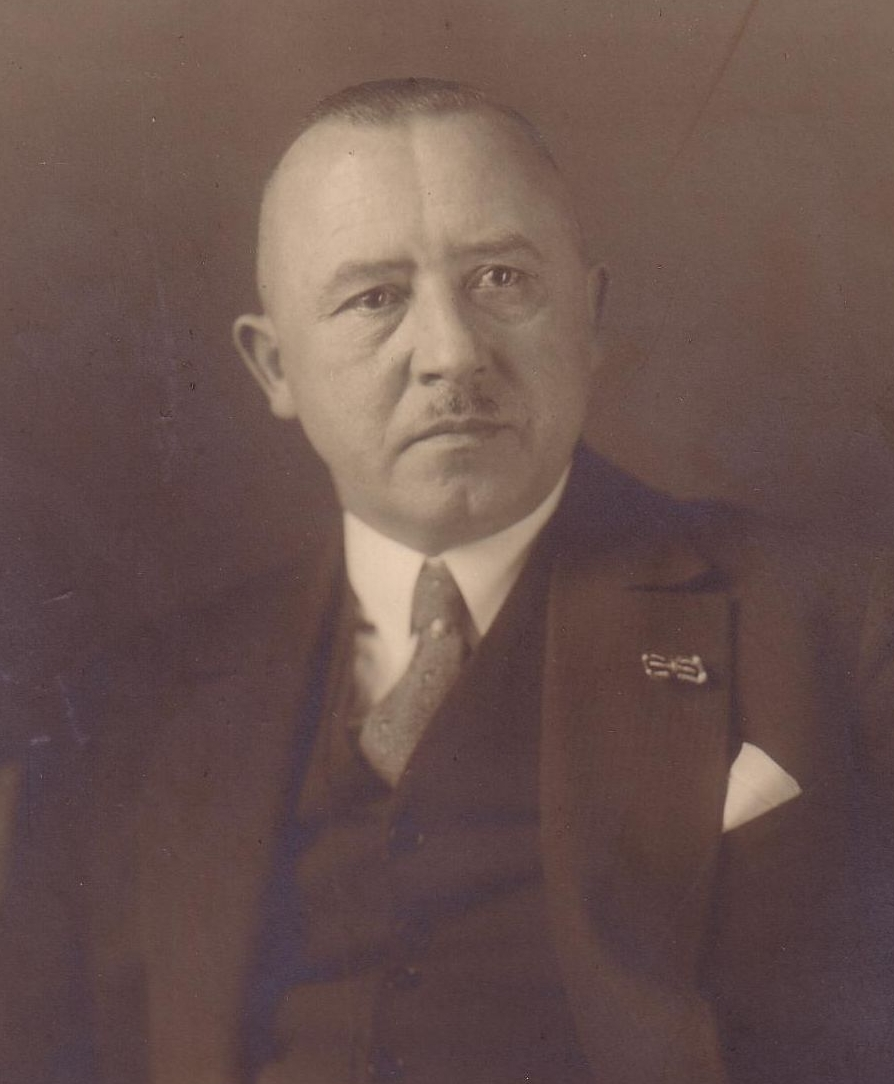
- Hans Pfundtner, before 1935

State Secretary Reich Ministry of the Interior
- In office 3 February 1933 – 19 August 1943
- Preceded by: Erich Zweigert
- Succeeded by: Position vacant

Personal details
- Born: 15 July 1881 Gumbinnen, Kingdom of Prussia, German Empire
- Died: 25 April 1945 (aged 63) Berlin, Free State of Prussia, Nazi Germany
- Cause of death: Suicide
- Party: Nazi Party
- Other political affiliations: German National People's Party
- Education: Albertus University
- Occupation: Lawyer
- Civilian awards: Golden Party Badge

Military service
- Allegiance: German Empire
- Branch/service: Imperial German Army
- Years of service: 1914–1917
- Rank: Hauptmann
- Unit: 3rd (2nd East Prussian) Grenadiers Regiment
- Battles/wars: World War I * Battle of Tannenberg
- Military awards: Iron Cross, 2nd class War Merit Cross, 1st and 2nd class

Johannes (Hans) Pfundtner (15 July 1881 – 25 April 1945) was a German lawyer and civil servant whose career spanned the German Empire, the Weimar Republic and Nazi Germany. During the Nazi era, he was the senior State Secretary in the Reich Interior Ministry and was involved in drafting the Nuremberg Laws. He committed suicide towards the end of the Second World War in Europe.

== Early life and career in the German Empire ==
Pfundtner was born a member of the landed gentry in Gumbinnen (today, Gusev, Kaliningrad Oblast) in East Prussia. After completing a humanistic Gymnasium, he studied law and economics at the Albertus University in Königsberg. During his university years, he became a member of the Corps Masovia, an old and distinguished student fraternity.

After passing the Referendar examination in June 1902, Pfundtner worked as a legal clerk at the district courts of Gumbinnen and Insterburg (today, Chernyakhovsk). He performed military service as a one-year volunteer with the 3rd (2nd East Prussian) Grenadiers Regiment "King Frederick William I". Returning to civilian life, he worked at the district court in Königsberg, with the public prosecutor's office and at the higher regional court. In 1908 he passed his Assessor examination. Back in Königsberg, he worked as a lawyer until September 1909, when he entered into the Prussian civil service as a government assessor. In February 1910 he entered the customs service, in November becoming chief customs inspector in Königsberg and, in October 1911, in Liebau (today, Lubawka). Pfundtner transferred into the Hamburg civil service as a government councilor (Regierungsrat) in February 1914.

At the beginning of the First World War, he was drafted into his old unit in Königsberg, and was seriously wounded in the thigh at the Battle of Tannenberg. After recuperating from his injury, Pfundtner was posted to a staff position with the headquarters command of the IX Army Corps in Altona on 1 October 1915. On 1 October 1917, Pfundtner obtained an appointment to the Reich Ministry of the Interior where he worked in its economics office. He was discharged from the Prussian Army with the rank of Hauptmann of reserves.

== Weimar Republic career ==
After the end of the war and the establishment of the new Weimar Republic, Pfundtner transferred into the Reich Ministry of Economics where he would work as a government counselor. In April 1921, he resigned from the civil service and renounced his pension entitlements, assuming the political post of Reich Plenipotentiary of the Foreign Trade Office. He then worked as a lawyer and notary at the Berlin Kammergericht (Court of Appeals) from 1925 to 1933. He also engaged in a political career, being elected as a Berlin City Councillor from 1925 to 1932, and to the Prussian State Council as a deputy member from Berlin from February 1926 until 3 March 1932.

Pfundtner was typical of the old-line Wilhelmine-era conservatives that staffed the bureaucracy of the republican government. He had been a member of the conservative German National People's Party (DNVP) since 1919 and was close to its leader, Alfred Hugenberg. He was a member of the Stahlhelm veterans' organization and first-vice-president of the Berliner Nationalklub von 1919 (Berlin National Club of 1919), a political association of former officers, aristocrats and officials nostalgic for a return of the monarchy. However, unlike other conservatives, Pfundtner left the DNVP and joined the Nazi Party in March 1932, before Adolf Hitler came to power. As a relatively early member of the Party he would later be awarded the Golden Party Badge.

== Third Reich career ==
After the Nazi seizure of power on 30 January, Pfundtner, with his vast knowledge and experience of ministerial bureaucracy, was appointed the State Secretary in the Reich Ministry of the Interior under Wilhelm Frick on 3 February 1933. Pfundtner soon set in motion plans to purge the civil service of Social Democrats and others perceived to be opponents of the regime, to be replaced by Nazis. His plan did not specifically mention Jews as a group to be purged. However, on 7 April 1933, the government promulgated the Law for the Restoration of the Professional Civil Service that, with certain exceptions, required the dismissal of Jewish civil servants. As early as 4 July 1933, in a speech to the Academy for Administrative Science, Pfundtner announced plans for a new law that would distinguish between those inhabitants possessing German or "alien" blood. Only those eligible for "Reich citizenship" would "be permitted to work in and for the State". On 25 August 1933, Pfundtner signed the Erste Ausbürgerungsliste des Deutschen Reichs von 1933 (first expatriation list), revoking the citizenship of 33 Germans, mostly opposition politicians and journalists, among them Albert Grzesinski, Philipp Scheidemann, Bernhard Weiß and Otto Wels. On 2 October 1933, Pfundtner became one of the founding members of Hans Frank's Academy for German Law. When the Prussian Interior Ministry was merged with the Reich Interior Ministry on 1 November 1934, Pfundtner remained a State Secretary in the combined ministry and Hermann Göring, the Prussian minister president, appointed him to the Prussian State Council.

On 13 September 1935, together with his Ministerialdirektor (Ministerial Director) Wilhelm Stuckart, Pfundtner met in Nuremberg with Hitler, who instructed them to prepare a law to address marriages between Aryans and non-Aryans. They set to work immediately, enlisting the assistance of Ministerialrat (Ministerial Councilors) Bernhard Lösener and Franz Albrecht Medicus, as Hitler wanted to have the proposal passed by the Reichstag when it met on 15 September. Pfundtner thus played a key role in drafting two of the statutes that would become known as the Nuremberg Laws: the Law for the Protection of German Blood and German Honor, which forbade marriage and extramarital intercourse between Jews and Germans, and the Reich Citizenship Law, which declared that only Aryans were eligible to be Reich citizens, while non-Aryans were excluded from citizenship rights. In addition, Pfundtner introduced the plan for the Romani Holocaust to exterminate Romani people in March 1936. This document referred to "the introduction of the total solution of the Gypsy problem on either a national or an international level."

Pfundtner was from 1934 to 1936 a member of the Presidium of the Organizing Committee and chairman of the Construction and Finance Committee for the 1936 Winter Olympics to be held at Garmisch-Partenkirchen. On 3 March 1936, he was named chairman of the Board of Trustees for the Tannenberg Memorial. On 23 September 1936, he was appointed president of the Examination Board for senior civil servants.

On 19 August 1943, Pfundtner submitted his resignation as State Secretary, at the same time that Frick was removed as Interior Minister in favor of Reichsführer-SS Heinrich Himmler. Pfundtner went into retirement and his post was left unfilled. He and his wife committed suicide in Berlin on 25 April 1945, to avoid capture by Red Army soldiers.

== Awards and decorations ==
- Iron Cross (1914) 2nd class
- Lifesaving Medal of Prussia
- Military Merit Cross of Mecklenburg-Schwerin 2nd class
- Hanseatic Cross of Hamburg
- Wound Badge in black
- War Merit Cross 1st and 2nd class

== Sources ==
- Kershaw, Ian (2008). Hitler: A Biography. W.W. Norton & Co. ISBN 978-0-393-33761-7.
- Klee, Ernst (2007). Das Personenlexikon zum Dritten Reich. Wer war was vor und nach 1945. Frankfurt-am-Main: Fischer-Taschenbuch-Verlag. ISBN 978-3-596-16048-8.
- Lilla, Joachim (2005). Der Preußische Staatsrat 1921–1933: Ein biographisches Handbuch. Düsseldorf: Droste Verlag. ISBN 978-3-770-05271-4.
- Marrus, Michael R., ed. (1989). The Nazi Holocaust. Part 3: The "Final Solution". Volume 2. London: Meckler. ISBN 0-88736-256-7.
- "Nazis to Create 3 Ranks in Reich". The New York Times. 6 July 1933. p. 4.
- Zentner, Christian; Bedürftig, Friedemann, eds. (1997) [1991]. The Encyclopedia of the Third Reich. New York: Da Capo Press. ISBN 978-0-306-80793-0.
