= Willem Sassen =

Dutch Nazi collaborator (1918–2002)

Wilhelmus Antonius Sassen (16 April 1918 – 2002) was a Dutch collaborator, Nazi journalist and a member of the Waffen-SS. He became known around 1960 as "the interviewer of Adolf Eichmann".

== Biography ==
Willem Sassen was born in Geertruidenberg, Netherlands. He was raised in a traditional Roman Catholic family in North Brabant and attended a gymnasium in Neerbosch near Nijmegen and in Breda. His father was impressed by the fascist ideas of the Zwart Front (literally 'Black Front'). Sassen decided against becoming a priest choosing to study law in Leuven and Ghent instead. As a student, he was a member of the German-Flemish workers' group DeVlag. When Sassen visited the 1936 Summer Olympics in Berlin, his admiration for Adolf Hitler and Nazi Germany grew. Because of Sassen's pro-Nazi political activities, the authorities expelled him from Belgium, so he was unable to finish his law studies.

In 1938, Sassen became a recruit in the Dutch army and was trained as an artillerist. When Nazi Germany invaded the Netherlands on 10 May 1940, Sassen was a member of the 7th Field Artillery regiment and was taken prisoner by the Germans for a short time. Sassen married Paula Fisette in 1940; the couple later divorced.

== Nazi and SS career to 1945 ==
On 22 June 1941, Nazi Germany invaded the Soviet Union (Operation Barbarossa), and Sassen volunteered for the German Eastern front. He became a member of the first Netherlands PK ("Propaganda Kompanie"). Because he had been working for Radio Bremen for some time already, he could start his work as a war correspondent after abbreviated training. He was a SS-Kriegsberichterstatter (SS-war reporter) with the SS-division Wiking in the southern sector of the front and in the spring of 1942 witnessed the offensive in the Caucasus. On 26 July 1942, Sassen was wounded near Rostov and during the following eight months recovered in hospitals in Kraków, Munich and Berlin. In April 1943, he was promoted to SS-Unterscharführer (the lowest rank of non-commissioned officer, comparable to a US Corporal) and assigned to an SS armoured division near Kharkov. In the summer of 1943, he followed another training course on war correspondence and propaganda together with Dutch colleagues in Villach, Austria.

From August 1943 to June 1944, together with his Flemish colleague Jef Desseyn, Sassen formed the permanent editor team of "Zender Brussel" (Radio Brussels). The team was also responsible for training courses for war correspondents. On 6 June 1944 (D-Day), Sassen was at the front in Normandy reporting the battles around Caen, Bayeux, Saint-Lô, Avranches, Falaise and Lisieux. On 1 September 1944, Zender Brussel was ordered to be evacuated to Germany. Sassen remained in the Netherlands, reported the airborne landings around Arnhem and became the editor of the newspaper Het Nieuws van den Dag in Amsterdam. On 23 October 1944, Sassen in his newspaper called upon the hungry and cold of Amsterdam to go robbing food and fuel in the districts of the more rich and wealthy people; this was too much even for the Germans, and on pressure of the Sicherheitsdienst police, Sassen was dismissed.

Sassen was sent to Doetinchem where he was active in the black propaganda Aktifpropaganda, Skorpion West. There he published Het Laatste Nieuws. At the beginning of 1945, Sassen was asked to participate in a Werewolf organisation in case the allied forces overran the German Army in the Netherlands. He became the leader of Neurop (Neu Europa). The group was to pass on military intelligence on allied troop movements and to commit sabotage.

The German Army capitulated sooner than was expected, and Sassen fled together with his younger brother Alfons to Alkmaar. Former members of the Dutch resistance offered them a refuge; Sassen had aided certain members of the Dutch resistance during the war, including Anthony Mertens, an old prewar friend.

== Escape to Argentina and second career ==
On 5 June 1945, Sassen was arrested in Alkmaar by British Field Security and interned in Fort Blauwkapel near Utrecht. On 15 December, he fled with two other inmates. He first visited his girlfriend Miep van der Voort in Utrecht, and later to his friend Anthony Mertens. For two years, Sassen was in hiding in Antwerp, Brussels and Amsterdam. With the help of his friends, among whom were Mertens and former SS member Karl Breyer, Sassen managed to obtain a passport. In May 1947, he flew in a KLM plane to Dublin, Ireland. There he met up with some of his old associates, before setting off to Argentina. Together with his girlfriend, Miep van der Voort, their daughter Saskia, and some former SS men and collaborators, he departed in the coastal vessel The Eagle under the command of former U-boat captain Schneider to Argentina. On 3 November, they arrived at the docks of Darsena Norte in Buenos Aires. Three days later they were allowed to disembark. He married Miep van der Voort, with whom he had two daughters. Their elder daughter is Saskia Sassen (born 1947 in The Hague), an American sociologist and professor of economics.

The Sassen family lived first in Ciudad Jardín Lomas del Palomar in Greater Buenos Aires, where their second daughter was born. Sassen started to work as a journalist, translator and as a ghost writer for Hans-Ulrich Rudel and later Adolf Eichmann.

Around 1960, Willem Sassen was recruited by Gerhard Mertins. He was asked to represent Merex AG, which was a cover for the illegal arms trade controlled by the German secret service Bundesnachrichtendienst. Other representatives in Latin America were Klaus Barbie (Bolivia), Friedrich Schwend (Peru), his brother, Alfons Sassen (Ecuador), and, in Madrid, Spain, Otto Skorzeny.

In the 1970s, Sassen among others worked as a PR-consultant for Chile's dictator Augusto Pinochet and Paraguay's dictator Alfredo Stroessner. Sassen was interviewed for an edition of the British World in Action (Granada/ITV, 1978) about his connections in Argentina with Josef Mengele; the fugitive Auschwitz concentration camp physician was still alive in a then unknown location.

Sassen's third wife was Els Delbaere, the daughter of a Flemish artist who, because of his own Nazi past, also fled to Argentina.

== The Eichmann interviews ==
In 1957, Sassen interviewed Adolf Eichmann about his involvement in the Nazis' Final Solution. In reality the interviews were group discussions arranged by Sassen and his publisher Eberhard Fritsch and held at Sassen's Buenos Aires home over a number of Sundays. Others were also in attendance, although Eichmann and his revelations dominate proceedings. In 1980, the Sassen documents or Sassen tapes, were transferred to Eichmann's widow, Veronika. The Sassen interviews are documented in detail in Eichmann Before Jerusalem by Bettina Stangneth first published in German in 2011 and in English in 2014.

About 15 hours of audio recordings survive out of around 70 hours in total. The tapes were recycled on cost grounds after transcripts of the conversation were made. The complete transcripted text runs to about 700 pages. At Eichmann's Jerusalem trial the tapes and the full transcript were not considered admissible to the court – only 83 pages which Eichmann had annotated or corrected were allowed as evidence. In the tapes Eichmann confessed that he in fact knew that millions of Jews and others were being killed: "I didn't care about the Jews deported to Auschwitz, whether they lived or died. It was the Führer's order: Jews who were fit to work would work and those who weren't would be sent to the Final Solution." Sassen asked him: "When you say Final Solution, do you mean they should be eradicated?", to which Eichmann replied: "Yes."

The memoirs were used as the basis for a series of articles that appeared in Life and Stern magazines in late 1960.

The audio recordings of Eichmann recounting his role in the Holocaust were featured in the documentary series, The Devil's Confession: The Lost Eichmann Tapes, directed by Yariv Mozer and produced by Kobi Sitt. At one point in the recordings, Eichmann says: "If we had killed 10.3 million Jews, I would say with satisfaction, 'Good, we destroyed an enemy' – then we would have fulfilled our mission".

== Bibliography ==
- Gerard Groeneveld: "Kriegsberichter", Nederlandse SS-oorlogsverslaggevers 1941–1945. Nijmegen: Vantilt, 2004. ISBN 90-77503-09-9 (in Dutch language) p. 356–368
- Jochem Botman: "De intriges van de gebroeders Sassen, De collaboratie, het verzet, de ontsnapping en de reünie met oude SS-kameraden in Latijns Amerika. Soesterberg: Aspekt, 2014. ISBN 9789461533579
- Jame Botman, Nazis to the Core, the Sassen brothers and their anti Bolshevik crusade in Latin America (Soesterberg, Holland, Publisher Aspekt, December 2015)ISBN 9789461538239
- Stangneth, Bettina, Eichmann Before Jerusalem: The Unexamined Life of a Mass Murderer, Alfred A. Knopf, New York 2014, ISBN 978-0-307-95967-6
