= Party line (politics) =

Idiom for the agenda and/or partisan ideology of a political party or social movement

In politics, "the line", "the party line", or "the lines to take" is an idiom for a political party or social movement's canon agenda, as well as ideological elements specific to the organization's partisanship. The common phrase "toeing the party line" describes a person who speaks in a manner that conforms to their political party's position, with the position frequently defined by the party leadership. The party structure pushing its representatives in parliament to vote along the line is referred to as party discipline, and efforts to enforce it are referred to as "whipping".

Likewise, a party-line vote is one in which most or all of the legislators from each political party voted in accordance with that party's policies. In several countries, a whip attempts to ensure this. The Marxist–Leninist concept of democratic centralism involves strict adherence to, and defence of, a communist party's positions in public known as the general line of the party or political line.

According to the American educator Herbert Kohl, writing about debates in New York in the late 1940s and early 1950s, "[t]he term 'politically correct' was used disparagingly to refer to someone whose loyalty to the CP line overrode compassion and led to bad politics. It was used by Socialists against Communists, and was meant to separate out Socialists who believed in equalitarian moral ideas from dogmatic Communists who would advocate and defend party positions regardless of their moral substance."

Used loosely, the phrase "the party line" may also refer to non-party organizations such as religious groups, business offices, or a social network that may have a semi-official organizational policy or position that is unrelated to any political party. In this sense it is used to describe following a certain plan of actions defined by the organization.

== In Leninism ==
In Leninism, the party line (also a correct line) is more than a party program: it combines statements on the domestic and international affairs, a set of policy guidelines, and an almost sacral ideological-political statement. In American English, at least in the 1960s, the term had a strong association with the CPUSA.

== See also ==
- Bipartisanship – Collaboration between political parties
- First-past-the-post voting – Plurality voting system
- Manifesto – Written declaration of principles and intentions
- Message discipline
- Party platform – Formal set of principal goals supported by a political party or candidate
- Two-party system – Government system dominated by only two major political parties

== Sources ==
- Aydelotte, William O. (2015). "Constituency Influence on the British House of Commons, 1841-1847". The History of Parliamentary Behavior. Quantitative Studies in History. Princeton University Press. pp. 225–247. ISBN 978-1-4008-6711-0.
- Hoover, J.E. (1961). The Communist Party Line: Prepared for the Subcommittee to Investigate the Administration of the Internal Security Act and Other Internal Security Laws of the Committee on the Judiciary, United States Senate, Eighty-seventh Congress, First Session. 87th Congress, 1st session. Senate document. U.S. Government Printing Office.
- Jowitt, K. (1992). New World Disorder: The Leninist Extinction. ACLS humanities e-book. University of California Press. ISBN 978-0-520-08272-4.
