= Bernhard Lösener =

German lawyer (1890–1952)

Bernhard Lösener (27 December 1890 – 28 August 1952) was a lawyer and "expert" on Jewish matters in the Reich Ministry of the Interior. He was among the lawyers who helped draft the Nuremberg Laws, among other legislation that deprived German Jews of their rights and ultimately led to their deportation to concentration camps.

On 13 September 1935, Adolf Hitler spoke in Nuremberg with Hans Pfundtner, State Secretary in the Reich Interior Ministry, and Wilhelm Stuckart, a Ministerial Counselor, instructing them to draft a law forbidding sexual relations or marriages between Jews and non-Jews. They, in turn, summoned Lösener and his colleague from the Interior Ministry, Franz Albrecht Medicus, to Nuremberg on 14 September to assist with the hurried drafting of the legislation, which was to be submitted to the Reichstag on 15 September. On the evening of the 14th, Hitler mandated that a Reich Citizenship Law also be drafted. The laws that were drafted and subsequently passed unanimously provided a broad framework for discrimination but left the thorny problem of defining who was a Jew to the implementation ordinances.

Lösener supported the exemption of the mischling, which is the term used in Nazi Germany to represent individuals classified with both Aryan and Jewish ancestry. Lösener surmised that having one or two Jewish grandparents was clear classification of being Jewish. He successfully argued that classifying such persons as Jewish would strengthen the Jewish gene pool by infusing Aryan blood. In addition, the exemption would enhance the Army by 45,000 soldiers. Since most mischling were not deported during the war, the classification may have saved up to 107,000 Germans of some Jewish ancestry from the Holocaust.

In his memoirs, Legislating the Holocaust, Lösener described his discovery of the Rumbula massacre, in which approximately 1,000 recently deported German Jews were transported by train to Rumbula Forest in Riga, Latvia, and there summarily executed along with 25,000 Latvian Jews. Lösener wrote he had not been aware of any orders to execute the German Jews and was disturbed by the executions. He discussed the incident with Stuckart which caused tension between them. Three years later in 1944, according to Lösener's Reich Ministry records, he was arrested for expressing sympathy for the German Jews.

At the Nuremberg Trials, Lösener gave testimony on his discussion with Stuckart regarding the Rumbula massacre in 1941. This testimony countered Stuckart's claim he had been unaware of the execution of Jews prior to the Wannsee Conference in 1942.

== See also ==
- Nuremberg Laws
- Rumbula massacre
