= Wilhelm Stuckart =

Nazi German government official (1902–1953)

- Stuckart in Allied custody c. 1947s

Reichsminister of the Interior
- In office 3 May 1945 – 23 May 1945
- President: Karl Dönitz
- Leading Minister of Germany: Lutz von Krosigk
- Preceded by: Paul Giesler
- Succeeded by: Position abolished

State Secretary of the Interior Ministry
- In office 1 April 1938 – 3 May 1945
- Minister: Wilhelm Frick; Heinrich Himmler; Paul Giesler
- Preceded by: Unknown
- Succeeded by: Position abolished

Reich Minister of Science, Education and Culture
- In office 3 May 1945 – 23 May 1945
- Preceded by: Gustav Adolf Scheel
- Succeeded by: Office abolished

Personal details
- Born: 16 November 1902 Wiesbaden, Prussia, German Empire
- Died: 15 November 1953 (aged 50) Hanover, Lower Saxony, West Germany
- Cause of death: Automobile accident
- Party: Nazi Party
- Education: Ludwig-Maximilians-Universität München; Goethe University Frankfurt
- Profession: Lawyer
- Known for: Nuremberg Laws; Wannsee Conference participant
- Awards: Golden Party Badge

Wilhelm Georg Joseph Stuckart (16 November 1902 – 15 November 1953) was a German Nazi Party lawyer, official, and a State Secretary in the Reich Interior Ministry during the Nazi era. He was a co-author of the Nuremberg Laws and a participant in the January 1942 Wannsee Conference, at which the genocidal Final Solution to the Jewish Question was planned. He also served as Reichsminister of the Interior in the short-lived Flensburg government at the end of the Second World War.

After the War he was tried in the Ministries Trial, but received no additional sentence, due to a lack of evidence. Stuckart then worked as a minor civil servant, until his death in a car accident.

== Early life ==
Stuckart was born in Wiesbaden, the son of a railway employee. He had a Christian upbringing. Stuckart was active in the far right early on and joined the Freikorps von Epp in 1919 to resist the French occupation of the Ruhr. In 1922, he started studying law and political economy at the Ludwig-Maximilians-Universität München and Goethe University Frankfurt, and joined the Nazi Party (NSDAP) in December that year; he remained a member until the party was banned after the failed putsch of 1923. To support his parents, Stuckart temporarily abandoned his studies to work at the Nassau Regional Bank in Frankfurt in 1924. He finished his studies in 1928, receiving a doctorate with a thesis entitled Erklärung an die Öffentlichkeit, insbesondere die Anmeldung zum Handelsregister ("Declarations to the Public, Especially Concerning the Enrollment to the Trade Register"); he passed the bar examination in 1930.

== Career ==
From 1930, Stuckart served as a district court judge. He renewed his association with the NSDAP and provided party comrades with legal counseling during this period. He did not rejoin the party immediately, as judges were prohibited from being politically active. To circumvent this restriction, Stuckart's mother joined the party for him as member number 378,144. From 1932 to 1933, he worked as a lawyer and legal secretary for the SA in Stettin (today, Szczecin), Pomerania.

Stuckart's quick rise in the German state administration was unusual for a person of modest background and would have been impossible without his long dedication to the Nazi cause. On 4 April 1933 he became the Mayor and State Commissioner in Stettin and was also elected to the state parliament and the Prussian State Council. On 15 May 1933, Stuckart was appointed Ministerial Director of the Prussian Ministry of Science, Art and Culture, and on 30 June 1933, he was made a State Secretary. In 1934, Stuckart was intimately involved in the dubious acquisition of the Guelph Treasure of Brunswick (the "Welfenschatz") – a unique collection of early medieval religious precious metalwork, at that time in the hands of several German-Jewish art dealers from Frankfurt, and one of the most important church treasuries to have survived from medieval Germany – by the Prussian State under its Prime Minister Hermann Göring.

On 7 July 1934, Stuckart became the State Secretary and head of the Central Office in the recently established Reich Ministry of Science, Education and Culture under Bernhard Rust. However, after disagreements with his superior, he was placed on leave for disobedience in September and was involuntarily retired on 14 November 1934. He moved to Darmstadt, where he worked from February to March 1935 as the president of the superior district court. On 7 March 1935, Stuckart began serving in the Reich Ministry of Interior, Division I: Constitution and Legislation, with the responsibility for constitutional law, citizenship and racial laws. Promoted to Ministerial Director on 1 April 1935, he was on 13 September 1935 given the task of co-writing, together with Hans Pfundtner, Bernhard Lösener and Franz Albrecht Medicus, the antisemitic Law for the Protection of German Blood and German Honour and The Reich Citizenship Law, together better known as the Nuremberg Laws, which the Nazi-controlled Reichstag passed on 15 September 1935. In 1936, Stuckart became a member of the Academy for German Law and chairman of its committee on administrative law.

Part of Stuckart's duties in the Interior Ministry involved providing a legal framework justifying the Nazi expansionist policy under constitutional and international law. On 16 March 1938, Hitler charged him with the management of the office carrying out the unification of Austria with the Reich, and he drafted the implementing decree. He was formally promoted to State Secretary in the Interior Ministry on 1 April 1938. In October, he was similarly charged with administering the transfer of the Sudetenland and, in March 1939, drafted the decree on the formation of the Protectorate of Bohemia and Moravia.

On 18 August 1939, Stuckart signed a confidential decree regarding the "Reporting Obligations of Deformed Newborns," which became the basis for the Nazi regime's euthanasia of children. Two years later, Stuckart's own one-year-old son, Gunther, who was born with Down syndrome, became a victim of this programme.

Stuckart was a member of the SA from 1932 and applied for membership in the SS in December 1933. On the recommendation of Heinrich Himmler, Stuckart finally transferred to the SS on 13 September 1936 (member number 280,042) with the rank of SS-Standartenführer. He was awarded the Golden Party Badge on 30 January 1939 and was promoted to the rank of SS-Obergruppenführer on 30 January 1944.

=== As a legal theorist ===
A prolific writer, Stuckart came to be seen as one of the leading Nazi legal experts, focusing especially on racial laws and public administration. In 1936 Stuckart, as the chairman of the Reich Committee for the Protection of German Blood, together with Hans Globke co-authored the government's official Commentary on German Racial Legislation in elaboration of the Reich Citizenship and Blood Protection Laws. The commentary explains that the laws were based on the concept of Volksgemeinschaft ("People's community") to which every German was bound by common blood. Individuals were not members of society (a concept viewed by the Nazi legal theorists as a Marxist one) but born members of the German Volk, through which they acquire rights. Interests of the Volk were to always override those of the individual. People born outside of the Volk were seen to possess no rights and represent a danger to the purity of the people's community. As such, anti-miscegenation legislation was justified, even necessary. Stuckart stated that these laws represented "a preliminary solution of the Jewish question".

In October 1939, Stuckart was tasked with investigating the comprehensive rationalization of the state administrative structure by decentralisation and simplification. The streamlining was to especially concern the field administration, which was to undergo extensive unification, preferably leading to a model of a small Interior Ministry supervising a single system of field agencies fielding broad local powers. Stuckart proposed that the state and party should effectively be combined in an overarching concept of the Reich, and should co-operate at the highest levels of power, so that ground-level friction between the institutions could be solved by referencing upwards. Stuckart and his disciples distinguished Herrschaft (administrative mastery) from an idealised Führung (leadership). The transformation of the state administration from a technical apparatus for the application of norms to a means of political leadership was the central idea in Stuckart's model: the ideal Nazi civil servant was not to be a passive lawyer of the obsolete "liberal constitutional state", but a "pioneer of culture, coloniser and political and economic creator". The administrative structure of the Reichsgaue, where the party and state authorities were combined and the Gauleiter fielded almost dictatorial powers over his domain, reflected Stuckart's theorization.

=== "Generalplan West" ===
German occupation of France during World War II.

A memorandum written on 14 June 1940 by Stuckart or someone in his vicinity in the Interior Ministry discusses the annexation of certain areas in Eastern France to the German Reich. The document presents a plan to weaken France by reducing the country to its late mediaeval borders with the Holy Roman Empire and replacing the French populace of the annexed territories by German settlers. This memorandum formed the basis for the so-called "north-east line" (also called the "black line" and the "Führer line") drawn in the occupied French territories after the Second Armistice at Compiègne, which stretched from the mouth of the River Somme to the Jura Mountains (see map). Because of the historical motivation for the area's Germanisation, cities and regions were to revert to their traditional German names. Nancy, for instance, would be known thereafter as Nanzig, and Besançon as Bisanz. Historian Peter Schöttler refers to this plan as a western equivalent of the Generalplan Ost.

=== Wannsee Conference ===
Stuckart represented Interior Minister Wilhelm Frick at the Wannsee Conference of 20 January 1942 chaired by SS-Obergruppenführer Reinhard Heydrich, which discussed the imposition of the "Final Solution of the Jewish Question in the German Sphere of Influence in Europe". According to the minutes of the conference, Stuckart supported forced sterilization for persons of "mixed blood" instead of extermination.

Heydrich called a follow-up conference on 6 March 1942, which further discussed the problems of "mixed blood" individuals and mixed marriage couples. At this meeting, Stuckart argued that only first-degree Mischlinge (persons with two Jewish grandparents) should be sterilized by force, after which they should be allowed to remain in Germany and undergo a "natural extinction". He had stated:

I have always maintained that it is extraordinarily dangerous to send German blood to the opposing side. Our adversaries will put the desirable characteristics of this blood to good use. Once the half Jews are outside of Germany, their high intelligence and education level, combined with their German heredity, will render these individuals born leaders and terrible enemies.

Stuckart was also concerned about causing distress to German spouses and children of "interracial" couples.

== After World War II ==
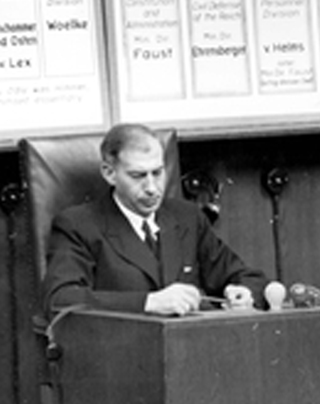
Stuckart at the Ministries Trial, 1948

Stuckart served briefly as Interior Minister in Karl Dönitz's Flensburg Government in May 1945. When that government was dissolved by the Allies, Stuckart was arrested on 23 May, interned in Camp Ashcan and called as an expert witness at the Nuremberg trial of Wilhelm Frick. He himself was tried by the Nuremberg Military Tribunal in the Ministries Trial in 1948 for his role in formulating and carrying out anti-Jewish laws. The court characterized him as an ardent Jew-hater who was able to pursue his anti-Semitic campaign from the safety of his ministerial office. Former co-worker Bernhard Lösener from Interior Ministry testified that Stuckart had been aware of the murder of the Jews even before the Wannsee Conference. Stuckart's defense argued that his support for the forced sterilization of Mischlinge was to prevent or delay even more drastic measures. The court was unable to resolve the question and sentenced him to time served in April 1949.

After being released from captivity, Stuckart went to work as city treasurer in Helmstedt and then as the manager of the Institute for the Promotion of Economy in Lower Saxony. He also worked for the regional committee of the right-wing All-German Bloc/League of Expellees and Deprived of Rights. In 1951, he was tried in a de-Nazification court, classified as a "fellow traveller" (Mitläufer) and fined five hundred Deutsche Mark.

== Death ==
Stuckart was killed on 15 November 1953 near Hanover, West Germany, in a car accident a day before his 51st birthday. There has been widespread speculation that the "accident" was, in reality, a staged collision targeting Stuckart as a former Nazi involved in Nazi racial and anti-Jewish policies and activities. However, nothing has ever been openly admitted by Mossad or other groups known to have been involved in other attacks on former Nazis.

== Personality ==
Stuckart held firm opinions concerning racial legislation and administrative organisation. At the Ministries Trial, his personal assistant Hans Globke described him as a "convinced Nazi" whose political faith weakened as time went on. From May 1940 onward, Stuckart made several requests to be released from his job to military service in the Wehrmacht, but these were turned down personally by Hitler.

== Writings ==
- Geschichte im Geschichtsunterricht, Frankfurt am Main 1934 ("A History of History Teaching")
- Nationalsozialistische Rechtserziehung, Frankfurt am Main 1935 ("National Socialist Legal Studies")
- Reichsbürgergesetz vom 15. September 1935. Gesetz zum Schutze des deutschen Blutes und der deutschen Ehre vom 15. September 1935. Gesetz zum Schutze der Erbgesundheit des deutschen Volkes (Ehegesundheitsgesetz) vom 18. Oktober 1935. Nebst allen Ausführungsvorschriften und den einschlägigen Gesetzen und Verordnungen, with Hans Globke, Berlin 1936
- Neues Staatsrecht, with Wilhelm Albrecht, Leipzig 1936 ("New State Law")
- Nationalsozialismus und Staatsrecht, Berlin 1937 ("National Socialism and Constitutional Law")
- Verwaltungsrecht, with Walter Scheerbarth, Leipzig 1937 ("Administrative Law")
- Partei und Staat, Vienna 1938 ("The Party and the State")
- Rassen- und Erbpflege in der Gesetzgebung des Dritten Reiches, with Rolf Schiedemair, Leipzig 1938 ("Racial and Hereditary Care in the Legislation of the Third Reich")
- Die Reichsverteidigung (Wehrrecht), with Harry von Rosen, Leipzig 1940 ("Reich Defense (Military Law)")
- Führung und Verwaltung im Kriege, Berlin 1941 ("Leadership and Administration During Wartime")
- Europa den Europäern, 1941 ("Europe For Europeans")
- Neues Gemeinderecht. Mit einer Darstellung der Gemeindeverbände, with Harry von Rosen, Leipzig 1942 ("New Municipal Law")
- Verfassung, Verwaltung und europäische Neuordnung, Bukarest 1942 ("Constitution, Administration and the New European Order")
- Verfassungs-, Verwaltungs- und Wirtschaftsgesetze Norwegens. Sammlung der wichtigsten Gesetze, Verordnungen und Erlasse, with Reinhard Höhn and Herbert Schneider, Darmstadt 1942 ("Constitutional, Administrative and Economic Laws of Norway. Collection of the Most Important Laws, Regulations and Decrees")
- Der Staatsaufbau des Deutschen Reichs in systematischer Darstellung, with Harry von Rosen and Rolf Schiedermair, Leipzig 1943 ("The State Structure of the German Reich: A Systematic Presentation")

== See also ==
- Fatherland – a 1992 alternate history novel dealing in large part with the Wannsee Conference
- Die Wannseekonferenz – a 1984 German TV film
- Conspiracy – a 2001 English language film
- Die Wannseekonferenz – a 2022 German-language TV docudrama

Wilhelm Stuckart is portrayed by Peter Fitz in the 1984 German film, Colin Firth in the 2001 film and Godehard Giese in the 2022 film.

Political offices
Preceded by Paul Giesler	Interior Minister of Germany; 1945	Succeeded by none
