= Eichmann Before Jerusalem =

Book by Bettina Stangneth

Eichmann Before Jerusalem: The Unexamined Life of a Mass Murderer
- First edition
- Author: Bettina Stangneth
- Original title: Eichmann vor Jerusalem – Das unbehelligte Leben eines Massenmörders
- Translator: Ruth Martin
- Language: German
- Subject: Holocaust, psychology, human behavior
- Published: 2011
- Publisher: Arche-Verlag
- Publication place: Switzerland
- ISBN: 978-3-7160-2669-4

Eichmann Before Jerusalem: The Unexamined Life of a Mass Murderer (German: Eichmann vor Jerusalem – Das unbehelligte Leben eines Massenmörders) is a book by Bettina Stangneth originally published in German in 2011. An edition in English appeared in 2014.

The work challenges Hannah Arendt's portrayal of Adolf Eichmann in Eichmann in Jerusalem: A Report on the Banality of Evil as an unintelligent and thoughtless bureaucrat. Stangneth shows that Eichmann's actions were the results of intentional, well-thought-out decisions of a man who strongly subscribed to Nazi ideology and who took pride in his actions.
