= Message discipline =

Message discipline is the concept that politicians and other public policy advocates should talk about what is relevant to achieve their aims, and not allow themselves to be sidetracked either by their own thoughts or the questions of press or audience.

Politicians repeating the same thing ad nauseam, or uses a question on one subject as a launching point to talk about a different subject, are said to be exercising message discipline. Message discipline may involve subordination of irrelevant personal opinions, or subordination of fluctuating desires to say what others want to hear versus maintaining an unwavering devotion to the message as it reaches out to greater numbers of potential audience members.

Message discipline is often practiced around wedge issues. Devolving to talking points (practicing message discipline) around issues such as same-sex marriage or abortion rights can be a powerful weapon in the politician's arsenal, either clouding a difficult line of questioning from an interviewer, or motivating the candidates' base to vote. Key to defining wedge issues and practicing message discipline are the selection of terms that low-information voters will rally around.

In a business context, message discipline is the practice of reducing and managing the number of messages going from headquarters and marketing functions to field organizations as well as front-line employees. This goal-oriented, structured, strategic communication can lead to operational success, as it reduces the clutter and mixed messages that sometimes afflict communications through organizational layers.

Message discipline is criticised by educated voters who see it as a method of obfuscation from what the electorate sees as important. Overly simplistic and repeated communications of the message are seen as dumbing down and can meet with the cynicism of the electorate.

== See also ==
- Party line (politics)
- Press conference
- Hedge (linguistics)
- Wedge issue
