= Bettina Stangneth =

German philosopher (born 1966)

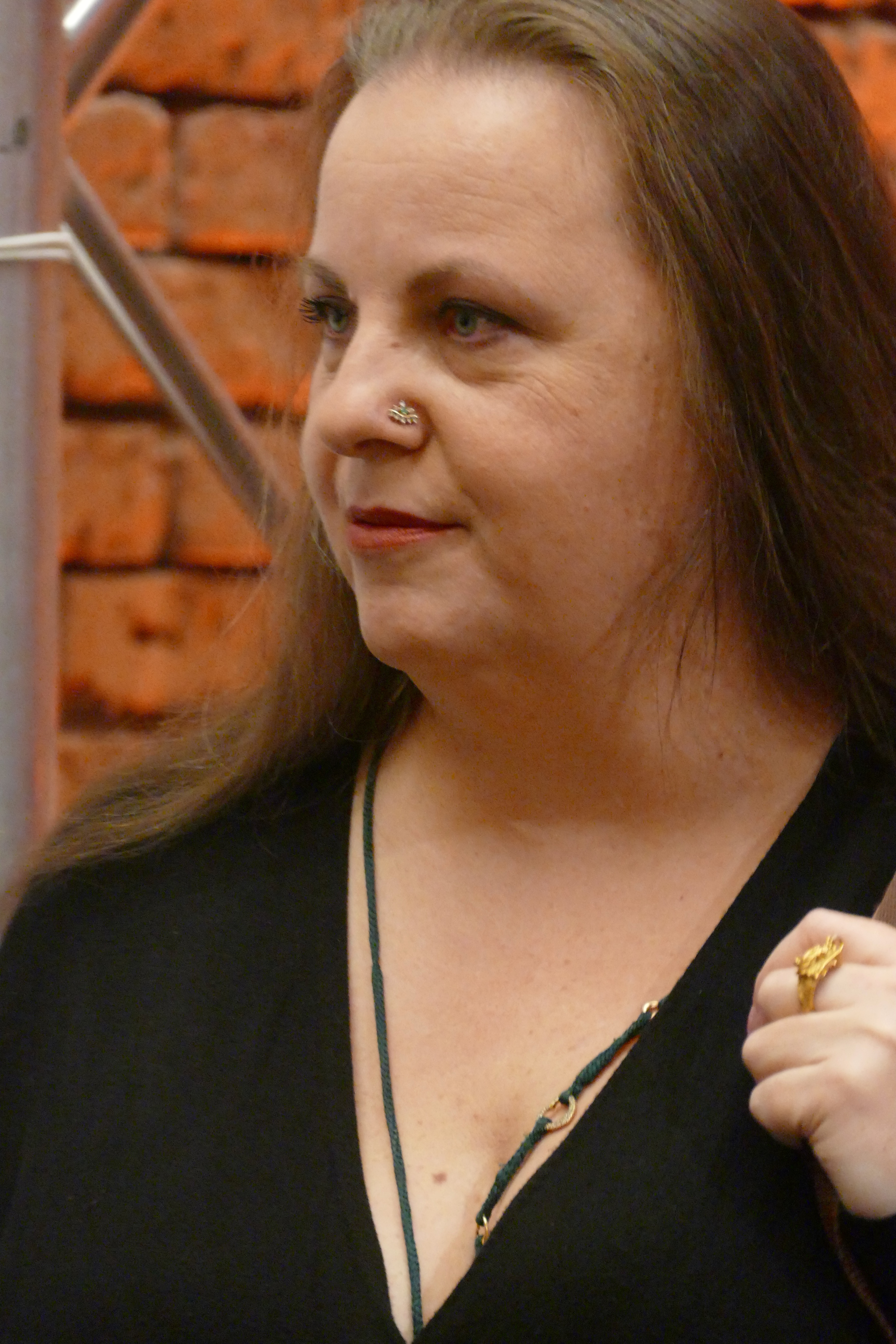
Bettina Stangneth, 2016

Bettina Stangneth (born 1966) is a German philosopher. Known for her work on antisemitism and National Socialism, she is the author of several books, including Eichmann Before Jerusalem (2014), which won an NDR Kultur Sachbuchpreis (non-fiction book award) in 2011 when it was first published in German.

Stangneth was awarded her PhD by the University of Hamburg in 1997 for a thesis on Immanuel Kant.

== Selected works ==
- (2000). Kultur der Aufrichtigkeit: Zum systematischen Ort von Kants Religion innerhalb der Grenzen der bloßen Vernunft. Würzburg: Königshausen & Neumann. ISBN 3-8260-1648-3
- (2003). Die Religion innerhalb der Grenzen der bloßen Vernunft/Immanuel Kant. Hamburg: Meiner. ISBN 3-7873-1618-3
- (2011). Eichmann vor Jerusalem: Das unbehelligte Leben eines Massenmörders. Zürich: Arche. ISBN 978-3-7160-2669-4
  - (2014). Eichmann before Jerusalem: The Unexamined Life of a Mass Murderer. New York: Alfred A. Knopf. ISBN 978-0-307-95967-6
- (2012). Lüge! Alles Lüge! Aufzeichnungen des Eichmann-Verhörers Avner Werner Less. Zürich: Arche. ISBN 978-3-7160-2689-2
- (2016). Böses Denken. Reinbek: Rowohlt. ISBN 978-3-498-06158-6
- (2017). Lügen lesen. Reinbek: Rowohlt. ISBN 978-3-498-06173-9
- (2019). Hässliches Sehen. Reinbek: Rowohlt. ISBN 978-3-498-06448-8
- (2020). Sexkultur. Reinbek: Rowohlt. ISBN 978-3-498-00145-2
