= 2011 in Israel =

- Decades: 1990s; 2000s; 2010s; 2020s
- See also: History of Israel; Timeline of Israeli history; List of years in Israel

Events in the year 2011 in Israel.

== Incumbents ==
- President of Israel – Shimon Peres
- Prime Minister of Israel – Benjamin Netanyahu (Likud)
- President of the Supreme Court – Dorit Beinisch
- Chief of General Staff – Gabi Ashkenazi to 14 February, Benny Gantz
- Government of Israel – 32nd Government of Israel

== Events ==
=== Domestic events ===
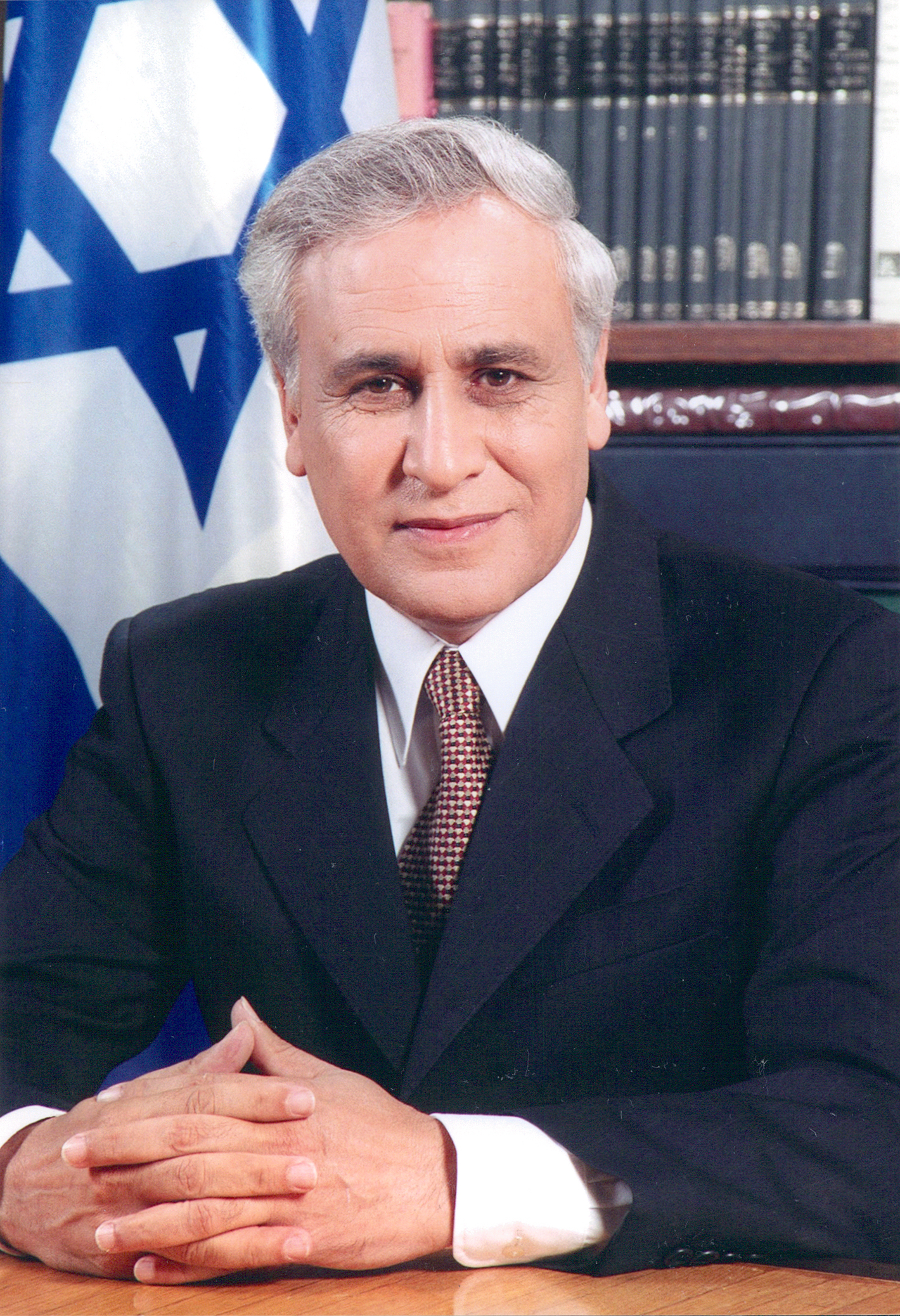
March 22: The former President of Israel Moshe Katsav is sentenced to seven years in jail for rape.

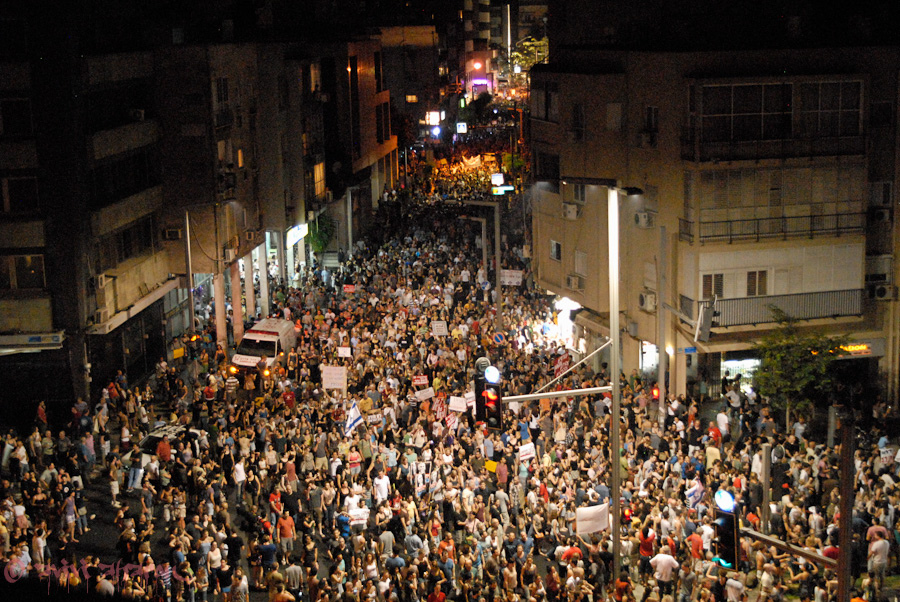
July 14–October 29: 2011 Israeli housing protests

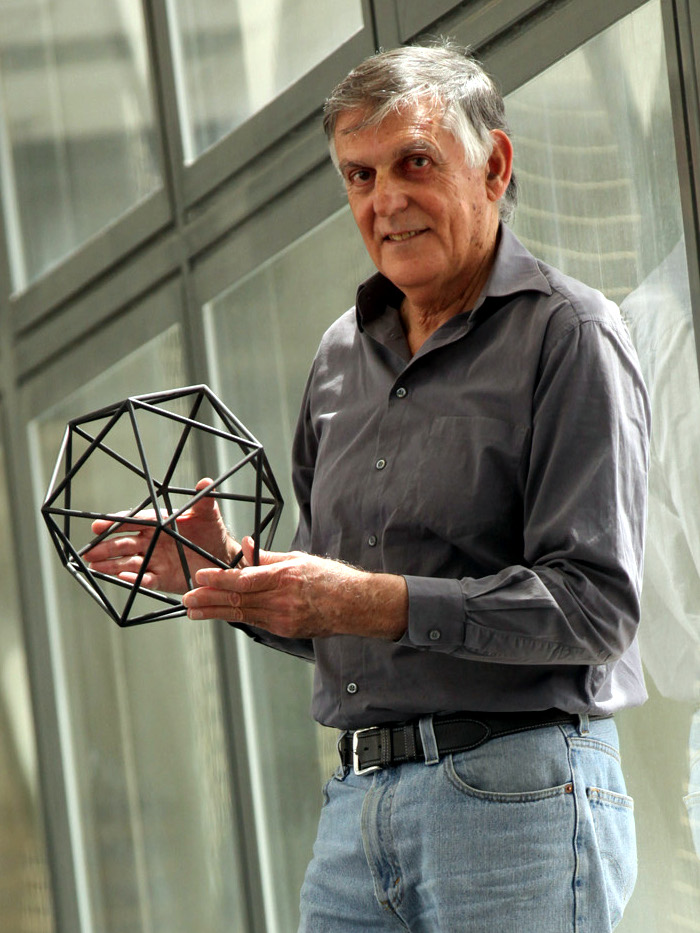
October 5: Israeli scientist Daniel Shechtman wins the 2011 Nobel Prize for Chemistry for the discovery of quasicrystals.

- January 17 – The leader of the Israeli Labor Party Ehud Barak and four other Labor Party MKs announce their resignation from the party and the formation of a new "centrist Zionist and democratic" faction called "Independence".
- February 1 – Prime Minister Benjamin Netanyahu cancels the appointment of Yoav Gallant to the post of Israel Defense Forces chief. The announcement came after months of scandal surrounding his appointment due to allegations that he had illegally seized public lands near his home in Moshav Amikam, and after the State Comptroller Micha Lindenstrauss stated that Galant lied to in an affidavit about exceeding his building rights.
- February 6 – 24-year-old Anat Kamm, a former Israeli soldier, is convicted in the Tel Aviv District Court after pleading guilty (in a plea bargain) to leaking more than 2,000 secret military documents to a journalist from the Israeli Haaretz newspaper.
- February 14 – Benny Gantz is appointed as the 20th Chief of Staff of the Israel Defense Forces.
- March 22 – The former President of Israel Moshe Katsav is sentenced to seven years in prison, two years probation and payment of compensation to his victims on charges of rape, indecent assault, sexual harassment and obstruction of justice.
- March 24 – Israeli women's basketball team Elitzur Ramla wins the women EuroCup final in France after defeating the French team ASPTT Arras 61–53. This was the first time in which an Israeli women's basketball team won a European cup.
- March 29 – The Knesset approves an amendment to the Nationality Law in a 37–11 vote. The amendment empowers the Israeli court system to revoke the citizenships of Israeli citizens convicted of terrorism, aiding the enemy in wartime, causing war, serving in enemy forces or espionage.
- March 30 – Analog television broadcasts end In Israel, as the Communications Minister of Israel requires all full power stations to send their signals digitally.
- 12 May – Dana International represents Israel at the Eurovision Song Contest with the song "Ding Dong" reaching the semi-final round.
- June – The cottage cheese boycott begins.
- June 17 – A massive gas explosion in an apartment building in Netanya's Independence Square kills three teenage girls (all recent immigrants from France) and an Israeli Arab and injures over 90 others.
- June 29 – Nahal Zin fuel leak – a backhoe loader performing maintenance repairs on an underground fuel pipeline in the Negev strikes and ruptures the pipeline, resulting in a massive leak.
- July 12 – The Knesset approves a new anti-boycott law, which would allow an Israeli individual or an Israeli organization proposing a boycott against Israel, Israeli institutions or territory under Israel's control, to be sued for compensation by a party claiming that it could be damaged by such a boycott.
- July 14 – 2011 Israeli housing protests begin.
- August 19 – The first line of the Jerusalem Light Rail is opened to the public.
- September 21 – Construction work on the Red Line of the Tel Aviv Light Rail, begins.
- October 5 – Israeli scientist Daniel Shechtman wins the 2011 Nobel Prize for Chemistry for the discovery of quasicrystals.
- November 10 – The Supreme Court of Israel has upheld a seven-year rape sentence against former President Moshe Katsav. Katsav was given one month to put his affairs in order, and will begin serving his sentence on December 7.
- November 13 – An Israeli cabinet committee passes legislation backed by prime minister Binyamin Netanyahu to limit potentially tens of millions in foreign funding to non-government organizations.

=== Global affairs ===
- April 18 – Israel becomes CERN nuclear group member.
- July 10 – Prime Minister Benjamin Netanyahu announces Israel's recognition of the Republic of South Sudan and offers the new state economic help, following its declaration of independence from the Sudan, the previous day.

=== Arab and Middle Eastern affairs ===
- February 5 – Amidst the 2011 Egyptian protests, an explosion occurs at the Arab Gas Pipeline near the El Arish natural gas compressor station in Egypt, which supplies natural gas to Israel and Jordan. As a result, supplies to Israel and Jordan were halted.
- April 27 – Natural gas supplies to Jordan and Israel are hit by an explosion in the Arab Gas Pipeline in the town of Arish in North Sinai near Egypt's border with Israel with an armed gang believed responsible.
- June 12 – Beginning of Ilan Grapel affair: Egyptian officials report the arrest of the 27-year-old Israeli-American Ilan Grapel on suspicion of espionage for Israel. Israeli officials have rejected the Egyptian accusations. Later that year, Egyptian officials admitted Ilan Grapel was not a spy, and he was scheduled for release in exchange for 25 Egyptian prisoners held in Israel.
- July 12 – Gunmen blow up an Egyptian natural gas pipeline to Israel and Jordan in the town of El-Arish in the Sinai Peninsula.
- September 2 – Turkey expels Israel's ambassador, downgrades ties with Israel to second secretary level and cancels all military agreements with Israel, hours before a UN report investigating the 2010 Gaza flotilla raid is published.
- September 9 – 2011 Israeli embassy attack: several thousand Egyptian protesters forcibly infiltrate into the Israeli embassy in Egypt, situated in Giza, after breaking down a recently constructed wall to protect the compound. The six embassy staff in a safe room were evacuated eventually from the site by Egyptian commandos, following the personal intervention of US President Barack Obama. Following the attack, the deputy ambassador remained in Cairo, and 85 staff members and their families returned to Israel.
- September 14 – Israel evacuates the Israeli embassy in Jordan following a warning of a violent anti-Israel demonstration planned to take place near the embassy building. Nearly all the embassy staff returned to Israel at midnight.
- September 27 – An explosion destroys the Arab Gas Pipeline in Egypt's Sinai Peninsula supplying natural gas to Jordan and Israel.
- October 11 – The US Federal Bureau of Investigation and Drug Enforcement Administration claim to have disrupted an attempt to bomb the Israeli and the Saudi embassies in Washington DC and an alleged terrorist plot to assassinate the Saudi Arabian ambassador, with possible links to Iran.
- October 27 – End of Ilan Grapel affair: Israel releases 25 Egyptian prisoners in order to secure the release of Israeli-American Ilan Grapel, who held been held in Egypt for more than four months on dubious espionage charges.

=== Israeli–Palestinian conflict ===
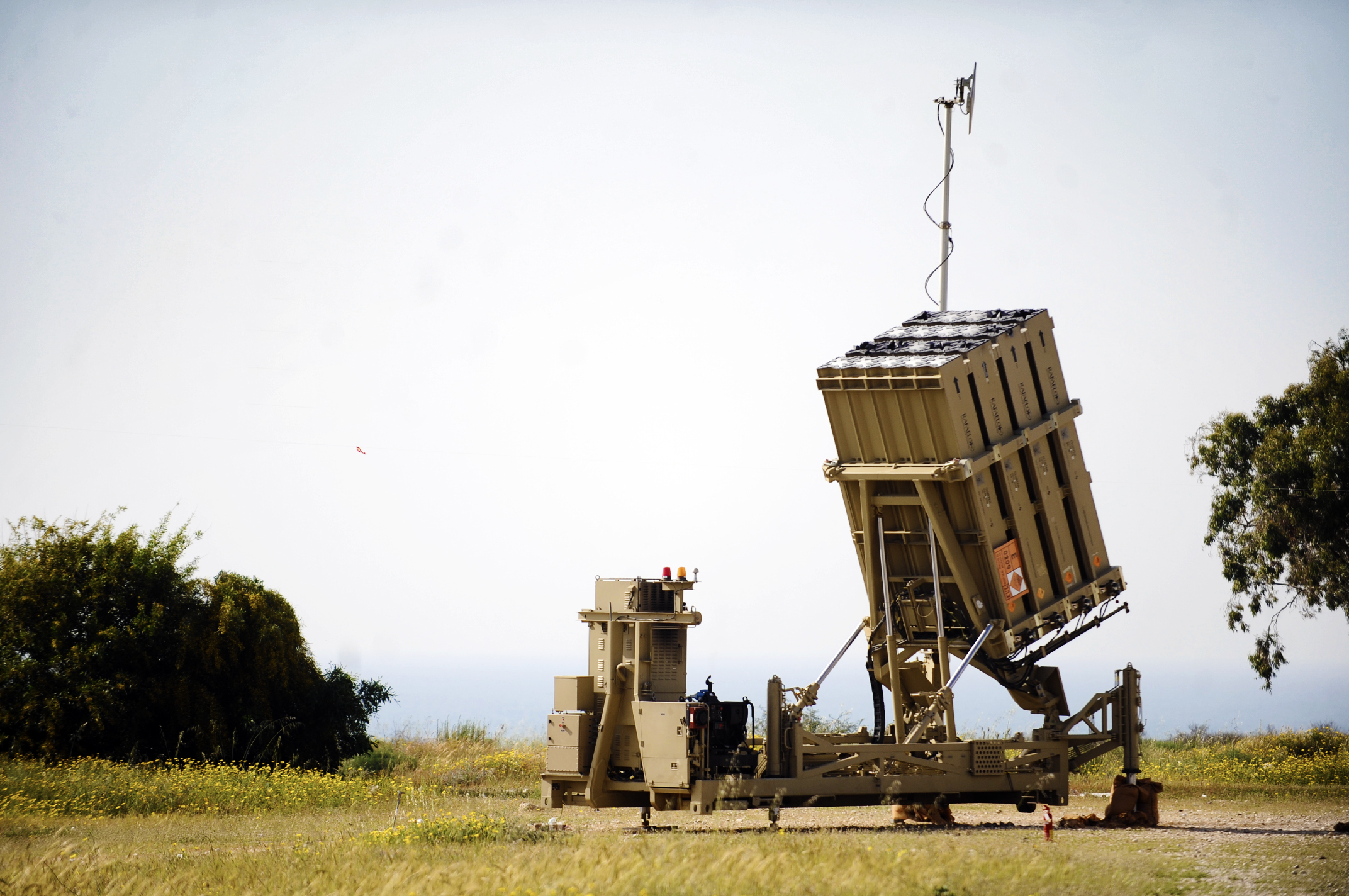
April 7: Israel succeeded, for the first time in human history, to intercept a short-range missile with the use of the advanced groundbreaking Iron Dome mobile air defense system.

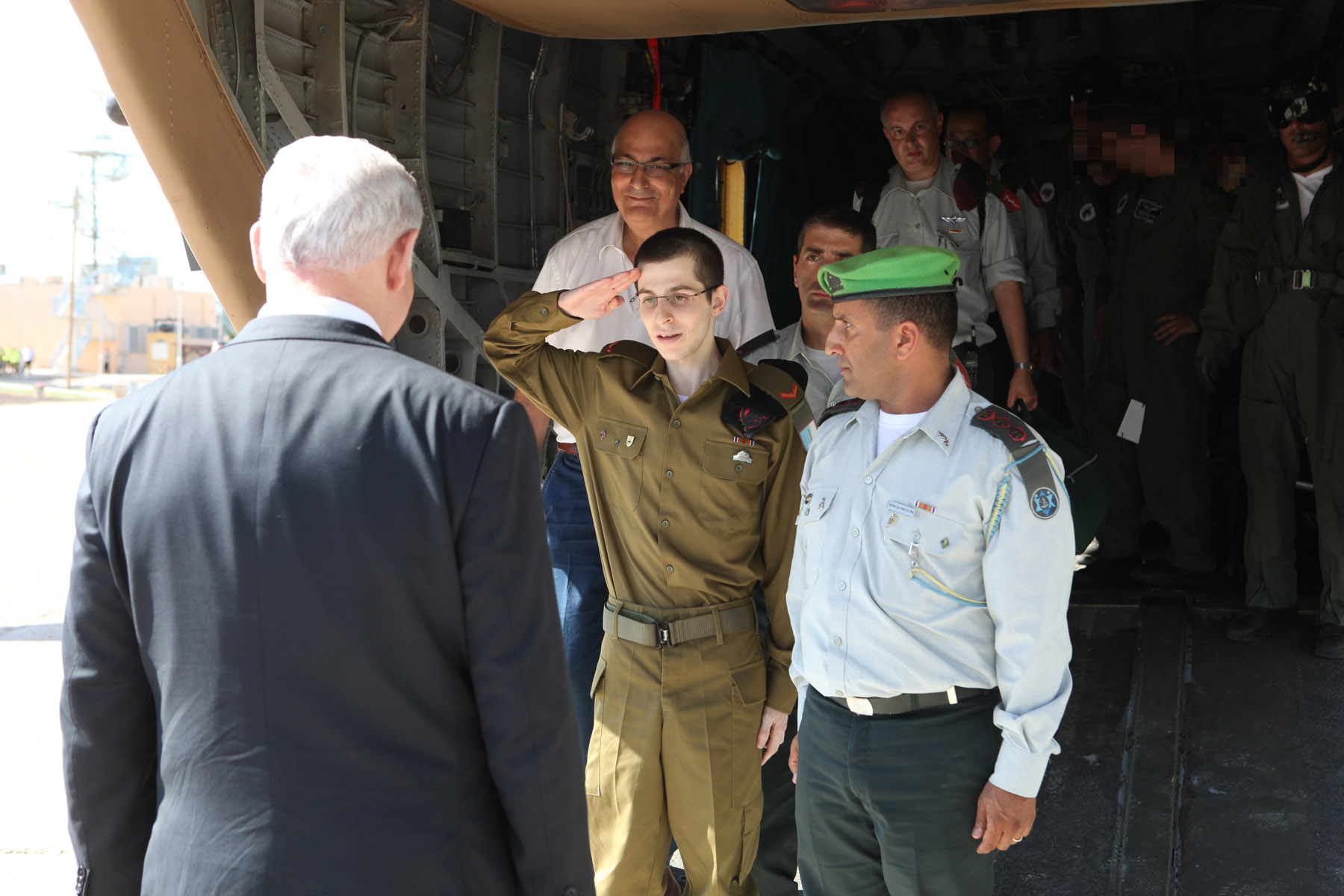
After more than five years in Hamas captivity IDF soldier Gilad Shalit was released and returned to Israel, while over a thousand Palestinian and Arab-Israeli prisoners are being released in exchange, October 18, 2011

The most prominent events related to the Israeli–Palestinian conflict that occurred during 2011 include:

- January 23 – The Palestine Papers: thousands of confidential documents relating to diplomatic correspondence detailing the inner workings of the Israeli-Palestinian peace process, are exposed by the Al-Jazeera news network. Following this, the Palestinian Authority condemns Al-Jazeera for releasing the documents and denies that the Palestinian Authority had agreed to make far-reaching concessions on Jerusalem as the documents purportedly reveal.
- February 19 – The U.S. vetoes a draft of a UN Security Council resolution critical of Israeli settlements in the West Bank.
- April 4 – Dirar Abu Seesi, a Palestinian engineer from Gaza, is indicted at Beersheba's District Court, accused of developing missiles and upgrading rockets for attacks on Israel; he claims that the Mossad kidnapped him.
- April 7 – The Iron Dome mobile air defense system successfully intercepts a Grad rocket launched from the Gaza Strip at the Israeli city Ashkelon, marking the first time in history a short-range rocket was ever intercepted.
- April 24 – A group of 15 Israeli Jewish worshipers entered the Palestinian city of Nablus to pray in the Jewish holy site Joseph's Tomb, without coordinating their visit with the IDF as required by law. After finishing praying, as the Jewish worshipers were leaving Nablus, their cars came under fire from a Palestinian Authority police jeep. Five Israelis were injured in the attack and the nephew of Israeli Culture and Sport Minister Limor Livnat was killed.
- May 15 – The 2011 Israeli border demonstrations took place to commemorate what the Palestinians observe as Nakba Day. Various groups of people attempted to approach or breach Israel's borders from the Gaza Strip, West Bank, Lebanon, Syria, Egypt and Jordan. At least a dozen people were killed.
- June 5 – Israeli forces fire on pro-Palestinian protesters attempting to breach the Syria-Israeli ceasefire-line in the Golan Heights on Naksa Day, marking the anniversary of the 1967 Six-Day War; Syria claims that close to 20 people were killed and over 325 injured, while Israeli officials confirmed at least 12 injures.
- July – Freedom Flotilla II
  - July 19 – The French-flagged yacht Dignité Al Karama, which was to have been part of the Freedom Flotilla II, is intercepted and boarded without incident by Israeli commandos, off the coast of Gaza, and escorted to the Port of Ashdod.
- July – Flightilla: Pro-Palestinian activists attempt to reach the West Bank by flying first to Israel from European airports. Most of them are stopped before boarding the planes or detained upon arriving to Ben Gurion airport and deported shortly after.
- September 2 – A UN report investigating the 2010 Gaza flotilla raid is published, which finds that the IDF acted 'legitimately' in trying to enforce Israel's blockade of the Gaza Strip, except for the lack of a final warning to the activists and the use of "excessive" force.
- September 23 – During the opening of the General Assembly of the United Nations, the President of the Palestinian National Authority Mahmoud Abbas makes a bid for a UN recognition in a unilateral declaration of a Palestinian state, which would exist in the Gaza Strip and the West Bank and have the East Jerusalem as its capital.
- September 23 – The quartet of Middle East negotiators – the United States, European Union, Russia and the United Nations call on both Israel and Palestine to resume negotiations.
- October 11 – The Cabinet of Israel approves the Gilad Shalit prisoner exchange.
- October 18 – Israel and Hamas begin a major prisoner swap in which the Israeli Army soldier Gilad Shalit, who had been held in captivity for over five years, is released in exchange for 1,027 Palestinian and Israeli Arab prisoners held in Israel, of whom 477 prisoners are released immediately, including 280 serving life sentences for planning and perpetrating terror attacks, and 550 prisoners are to be released in December 2011.

Notable Palestinian militant operations against Israeli targets

The most prominent Palestinian militant acts and operations committed against Israeli targets during 2011 include:

- March 12 – Itamar attack: Two Palestinian teens armed with knives infiltrated the West Bank settlement of Itamar and stabbed to death five Israeli family members, including the parents and three of their children, aged 11, 3 and a four-month-old infant.
- March 23 – 2011 Jerusalem bus bombing: an explosive device was placed in a suitcase on the sidewalk exploded next to bus number 74 near the Jerusalem International Convention Center complex. A woman is killed in the explosion and at least 50 people are injured.
- April 4 – Israeli actor and peace activist Juliano Mer-Khamis, of both Jewish and Christian Arab origin, is gunned down in the West Bank by masked militants.
- April 7 – 2011 Israeli school bus anti-tank missile attack: An anti-tank missile fired from the Gaza Strip hits a school bus, moderately wounding the bus driver, and critically injuring a 16-year boy who later died of his wounds.
- August 18 – 2011 southern Israel attacks: Eight people were killed and dozens are injured in southern Israel after a string of terrorist attacks on a highway targeting two civilian buses and cars as well a military bus responding to the attacks. Although no organization took responsibility for the attacks the Israeli security establishment blamed the Popular Resistance Committees (PRC) in Gaza for carrying out the attacks. In retaliation, Israel launched an air raid on the town of Rafah in which six Palestinians militants from the Popular Resistance Committee were killed, among them two seniors in the organization.
- August 29 – 2011 Tel Aviv nightclub attack: a 20-year-old Palestinian stole an Israeli taxi cab and rammed it into a police checkpoint guarding the popular Haoman 17 nightclub in Tel Aviv, which was filled with 2,000 Israeli teenagers. After crashing into the checkpoint, the attacker jumped out of the vehicle and began stabbing several people. Five civilians and four police officers were injured in the attack.
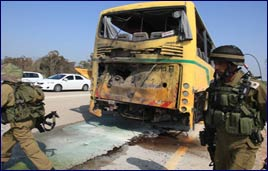
2011 Israeli school bus anti-tank missile attack

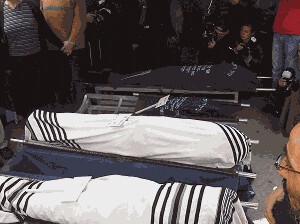
Funeral of the victims of the Itamar attack in Givat Shaul

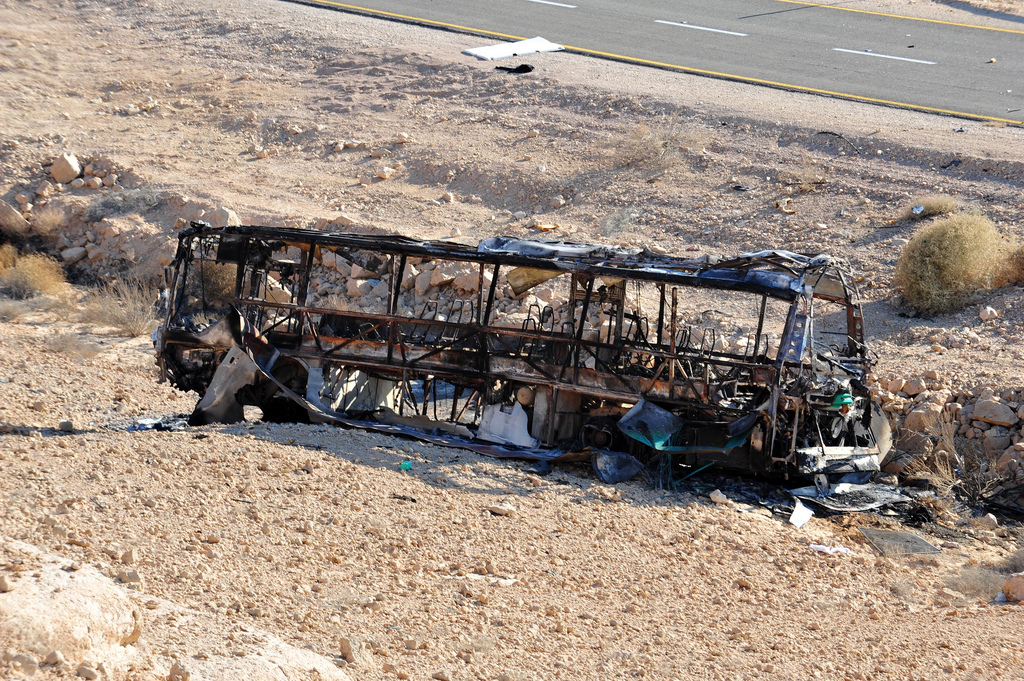
The charred remains of the Egged bus hit by suicide bomber during the 2011 southern Israel cross-border attacks

Notable Israeli military operations against Palestinian militancy targets
The most prominent Israeli counter-terrorist operations (military campaigns and military operations) carried out against Palestinian militants during 2011 include:

- March 15 – The Israeli Navy intercepts the cargo ship "Victoria", which was carrying a long list of advanced weapons that were smuggled from Iran and were allegedly bound for the militant organizations operating in the Gaza Strip.
- March 16 – The Israeli Air Force attacks a training site of the Palestinian militant group Al Qassam brigades in the southern part of Gaza city in response to a rocket launched from the Gaza Strip at the Israeli southern communities in the Sdot Negev Regional Council in the southern district of Israel. Palestinians reported that three people were killed in the attack and three were wounded.

== Notable deaths ==
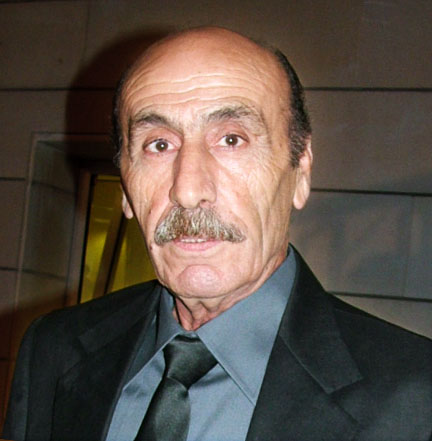
Yosef Shiloach

Al Schwimmer

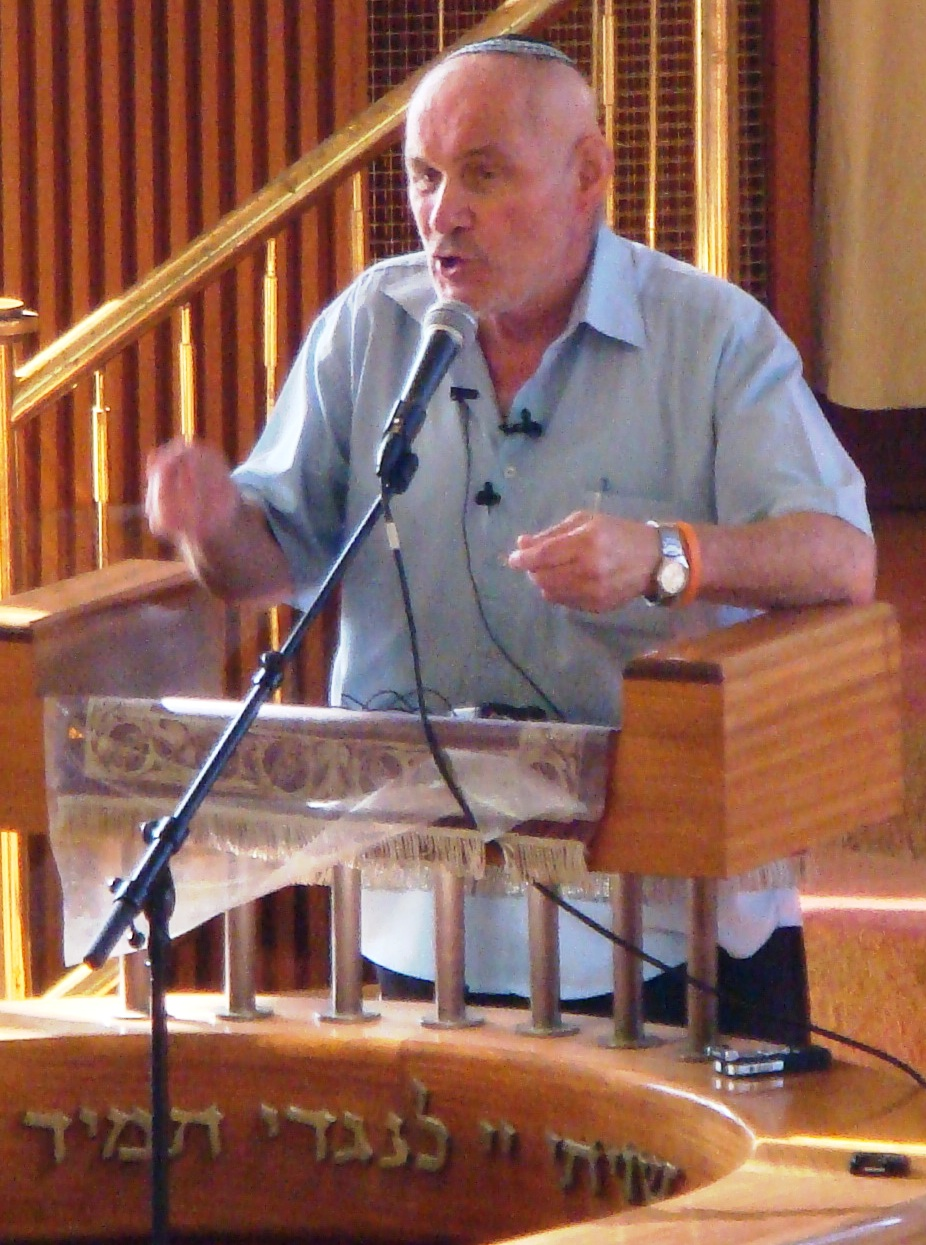
Hanan Porat

- January 3 – Yosef Shiloach (born 1941), Iranian-born Israeli actor.
- January 11 – Ze'ev Segal (born 1947), Israeli jurist and journalist.
- January 13 – Tuviah Friedman (born 1922), Polish-born Israeli Nazi hunter.
- January 14 – David Coren (born 1917), Israeli politician.
- January 20 – Sonya Peres (born 1923), Ukrainian-born wife of President Shimon Peres.
- February 10 – Michael Harsgor (born 1924), Romanian-born Israeli historian.
- February 24 – Jerrold Kessel (born 1945), South African-born Israeli journalist and author.
- February 28 – Netiva Ben-Yehuda (born 1928), Israeli author and radio personality.
- March 12 – Tawfik Toubi (born 1922), Israeli Arab communist politician.
- March 14 – Giora Leshem (born 1940), Israeli poet and publisher.
- March 18 – Ze'ev Boim (born 1943), Israeli Knesset member.
- March 22 – Reuven Shefer (born 1925), Israeli actor.
- March 30 – Jacques Amir (born 1933), Moroccan-born Israeli politician.
- March 30 – Tamar Golan (born 1925), Israeli journalist and diplomat.
- April 4 – Juliano Mer-Khamis (born 1958), Israeli actor, director, filmmaker and political activist of Jewish and Arab origin.
- April 25 – Avraham Tiar (born 1924), Tunisian-born Israeli politician.
- May 1 – Moshe Landau (born 1912), German-born Israeli jurist and president of the Supreme Court of Israel.
- May 5 – Yosef Merimovich (born 1924), Cypriot-born Israeli football player and manager.
- May 20 – Arieh Handler (born 1915), Israeli Zionist leader.
- May 24 – Arthur Goldreich (born 1929), South African-born Israeli political activist.
- June 3 – Sammy Ofer (born 1922), Romanian-born Israeli businessman and the richest man in Israel at the time of his death.
- June 7 – Gavriel Tsifroni (born 1914), Russian (Lithuania)-born Israeli journalist.
- June 7 – Haim Yisraeli (born 1927), Polish-born Israeli civil servant.
- June 10 – Al Schwimmer (born 1917), American-born Israeli businessman, founder of Israel Aerospace Industries.
- June 16 – Yehuda Kiel (born 1916), Russian-born Israeli educator and bible commentator.
- June 17 – Nathan Sharon (born 1925), Polish-born Israeli biochemist.
- June 27 – Michel Yehuda Lefkowitz (born 1913), Russian (Belarus)-born Israeli rabbi.
- July 29 – Elazar Abuhatzeira (born c. 1941), Moroccan-born orthodox Sephardi rabbi.
- July 29 – Shulamit Shamir (born 1923), Bulgarian-born wife of former prime minister Yitzhak Shamir.
- August 5 – Adi Talmor (born 1953), Israeli journalist and news presenter.
- August 11 – Noah Flug (born 1925), Polish-born Israeli economist, advocate for rights of Holocaust survivors.
- August 20 – Rafael Halperin (born 1924), Austrian-born Israeli businessman, rabbi and former professional wrestler.
- August 29 – Ayala Zacks-Abramov (born 1912), Israeli art patron.
- September 6 – Dan David (born 1929), Romanian-born Israeli businessman and philanthropist.
- September 11 – Yuli Ofer (born 1924), Romanian-born Israeli businessman and entrepreneur.
- September 26 – Michael Shor (born 1920), Soviet (Ukraine)-born Israeli security official, former CEO of Israel Military Industries.
- September 27 – Ida Fink (born 1921), Polish-born Israeli author.
- October 2 – Moshe Wertman (born 1924), Polish-born Israeli politician.
- October 2 – Taha Muhammad Ali (born 1931), Arab-Israeli poet.
- October 4 – Hanan Porat (born 1943), Israeli rabbi, educator and politician.
- October 4 – Shmuel Shilo (born 1929), Polish-born Israeli actor and director.
- October 7 – Avner Treinin (born 1928), Israeli poet and chemist.
- October 23 – Amnon Salomon (born 1940), Israeli cinematographer.
- November 6 – Peretz Kidron (born 1933), Austrian-born Israeli writer, journalist and translator.
- November 7 – Dov Schwartzman (born 1921), Russian-born Israeli Haredi rabbi and rosh yeshiva in Jerusalem.
- November 8 – Nosson Tzvi Finkel (born 1943), American-born Haredi rabbi and rosh yeshiva (dean) of the Mir Yeshiva in Jerusalem.
- November 9 – Shmuel Ben-Artzi (born 1914), Russian (Poland)-born Israeli writer, father in-law of Benjamin Netanyahu.
- November 21 – Eli Hurvitz (born 1932), Israeli industrialist, former chairman and CEO of Teva Pharmaceutical Industries.
- December 6 – Peretz Kidron (born 1933), Israeli pacifist, writer, journalist, and translator.
- December 8 – Roman Baembaev (born 1956), Ukrainian-born Israeli poet.
- December 8 – Nakdimon Rogel (born 1925), Israeli journalist and broadcaster, author of the Nakdi Report.
- December 9 – Davida Karol (born 1917), Israeli actress.
- December 16 – Mark Kopytman (born 1929), Ukrainian-born Israeli composer.
- December 25 – Gideon Doron, (born 1945), Israeli political scientist; The leader of HaYisraelim

== Major public holidays ==
- Tu Bishvat – nightfall, January 19 to nightfall, January 20
- Fast of Esther – March 17 (dawn to nightfall)
- Purim – nightfall, March 19 to nightfall, March 20
- Shushan Purim – nightfall, March 20 to nightfall, March 21
- Fast of the Firstborn – April 18 (dawn to sunset)
- Passover and Chol HaMoed Pesach – sunset, April 18 to nightfall, April 25 (7th day) (an additional day is observed outside Israel)
- Holocaust Remembrance Day – nightfall, April 30 to nightfall, May 1
- Fallen Soldiers Remembrance Day – nightfall, May 8 to nightfall, May 9
- Israel's Independence Day – nightfall, May 9 to nightfall, May 10
- Lag Ba'omer – nightfall, May 21 to nightfall, May 22
- Jerusalem Day – nightfall, May 31 to nightfall, June 1
- Shavuot – sunset, June 7 to nightfall, June 8 (a second day is observed outside Israel)
- Seventeenth of Tammuz fast – July 19 (dawn to nightfall)
- Ninth of Av fast – sunset, August 8 to nightfall, August 9
- Rosh Hashanah – sunset, September 28 to nightfall, September 30
- Fast of Gedalia – October 2 (dawn to nightfall)
- Yom Kippur – sunset, October 7 to nightfall, October 8
- Sukkot and Chol HaMoed Sukkot – sunset, October 13 to sunset, October 19
- Simchat Torah/Shemini Atzeret – sunset, October 19 to nightfall, October 20 (a second day is observed outside Israel)
- Hanukkah – nightfall, December 20 to nightfall, December 28

== See also ==
- Israel's public controversy over exclusion of women (2011)
- 2007–present blockade of the Gaza Strip
- List of Palestinian rocket attacks on Israel, 2011
- List of Israeli films of 2011
- List of violent incidents in the Israeli–Palestinian conflict, 2011
- 2011 in the Palestinian territories
