= 2011 Israeli border demonstrations =

- Part of the Arab Spring
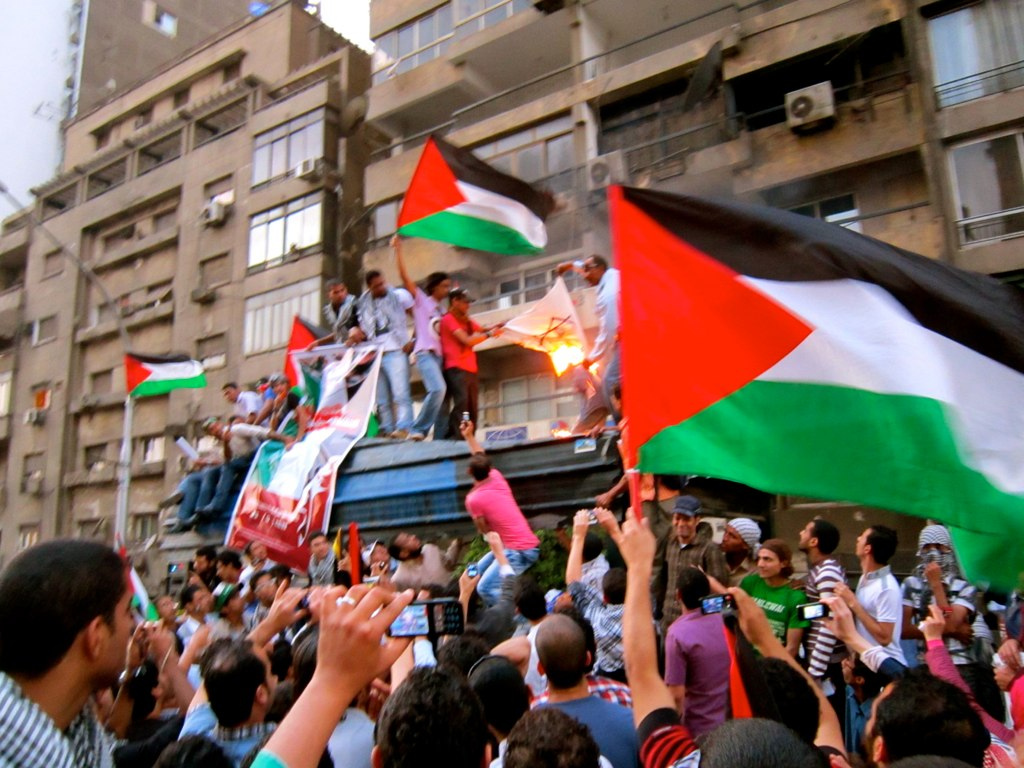
- An Egyptian burning an Israeli flag during a Nakba Day protest at the Israeli embassy in Cairo.
- Date: 15 May 2011 and 5 June 2011
- Location: Borders of Israel: Egypt; Jordan; Lebanon; West Bank; Syria
- Caused by: Observance of Nakba Day
- Methods: Demonstrations

Number
30,000+ protesters	

Casualties
- Deaths: 12–40
- Injuries: 380–730+

The 2011 Israeli border demonstrations started on 15 May 2011, to commemorate what the Palestinians observe as Nakba Day. Various groups of people attempted to approach or breach Israel's borders from the Palestinian-controlled territory, Lebanon, Syria, Egypt and Jordan. At least a dozen people were killed when protesters attempted to cross the border from Syria.

On 5 June 2011, there were further protests on the border with Syria and, according to Syrian authorities, 23 protesters were killed and 350 wounded by live fire from Israeli forces, though Israeli sources suggested these figures were exaggerated. Israeli army spokesman Yoav Mordechai accused Syria of creating "a provocation" at the border to distract attention from the Syrian government's crackdown on the Syrian uprising.

== 15 May events ==
Inspired by the uprisings and revolutions taking place in the Arab world, Palestinians used Facebook to call for mass protests throughout the region on 15 May 2011 Nakba Day. A page calling for a "Third Palestinian Intifada" to begin on 15 May was started on 9 March 2011, garnered more than 350,000 "likes" before being taken down by Facebook managers at the end of March after complaints from the Israeli government as well as a counter group which repeatedly requested Facebook to block the page on the grounds that it incited violence. The page called for mass marches to Israel and Palestinian Authority from Egypt, Lebanon, Syria and Jordan to commemorate the Nakba and demand the right of return for all Palestinian refugees.

=== Egypt ===
Organizers in Egypt had been preparing for weeks to implement the calls made on Facebook for a mass march to the border. On Saturday 14 May, thousands were planning to make their way toward the Rafah crossing with Gaza in convoys set to depart from Cairo, Alexandria, Suez, Damietta, North Sinai, Gharbiya, Beni Suef, Assiut, Qena and Sohag. However, an order from the Supreme Council of the Armed Forces to tourism companies not to send buses to the convoy organizers left them without sufficient transportation and the few buses they did manage to procure were stopped by the army. The blockage of access by Egyptian forces to the Sinai Peninsula, meant that only about 80 activists managed to reach the border with Rafah.

=== Jordan ===
In Jordan, 200 Palestinian students attempted to march towards the Israeli border, but were restrained by Jordanian security forces resulting in the injury of six people. They were part of a larger group of 500 who were stopped at the Allenby Bridge. Jordanian authorities said a total of 25 people were injured, including 11 police officers. The political arm of the Muslim Brotherhood in Jordan, the Islamic Action Front, condemned police actions which they described as "shocking" stating: "We condemn the attack, which is part of government policies to impose its will on the people, and we demand an end to such policies that have harmed Jordan's image."

=== Lebanon ===
Activists had organized an event on a mountaintop in the village of Maroun al-Ras that overlooks the border with Israel. Some 30,000 people, including Palestinian refugees from various Palestinian refugee camps across Lebanon attended. After walking up the mountain to the protest site, many decided to descend the opposite side, and continued on towards the border. Lebanese Army soldiers fired into the air in a failed effort to deter them. Crossing through a minefield that was laid by Israel during the 2006 Lebanon War, they reached the border fence, and threw stones over it, chanting for their right of return. The Lebanese army intervened and began firing M16 assault rifles and tear gas, which sent protesters fleeing back up the mountain.

Eleven participants were killed and 100 injured by gunfire before the protesters retreated. There were conflicting reports of who shot them. Media reported that the protesters were shot by the IDF. The IDF said most of those killed were likely shot by the Lebanese Armed Forces (LAF) and that they had a video that established this, but would not release it on the grounds that it might cause embarrassment to the Lebanese Army.

=== Gaza Strip ===
Between 500 and 600 Palestinians marched towards the Erez Crossing, a border crossing between Israel and the Gaza Strip on 15 May. Palestinian medical officials said that IDF forces fired on the group intermittently over the course of a couple of hours with tanks, machine guns, gas canisters and sound bombs, killing one demonstrator and wounding more than 80.

=== Palestinian Authority ===
In the West Bank, Palestinians from a burgeoning new youth movement convened seminars on strategies for non-violent resistance to prepare for a 15 May march on the Qalandia checkpoint separating Ramallah from Jerusalem, and several of them were arrested by Palestinian Authority police in the month before the protest date. On 15 May, more than 1,000 protestors marched through the Qalandia refugee camp until they reached within 100 metres of the checkpoint separating Ramallah from Jerusalem where Israeli forces used tear gas to disperse most of them. Around 100 Palestinian protesters engaged in a standoff with Israeli forces over the next seven hours, throwing stones, as Israeli troops fired tear gas and rubber bullets. More than 80 protestors, including three paramedics, sustained injuries and twenty were hospitalized; a doctor at the hospital said the last time he saw so many casualties in one day was during the Second Intifada.

=== Syria ===
In Syria, the events were organized by phone and internet by Palestinian refugees, most of them university students independent of any political faction, in response to the call for a "Third Palestinian Intifada" on Facebook. Demonstrators gathered near the Israeli-Syrian ceasefire line waving Palestinian flags, and then marched toward and breached the fence, entering the Israeli-controlled Golan Heights. The first wave of demonstrators to move toward the fence were stopped by Syrian police who were later overtaken when a second group arrived. The sole Israeli patrol present was similarly overwhelmed and opened fire on the demonstrators. Four demonstrators were killed and dozens injured.

The Israeli military stated that it only fired warning shots when about 1,000 demonstrators approached the fence, and some 300 children among them, rushed toward the fence. More than a hundred managed to bypass the fence and enter the Arab Druze town of Majdal Shams. About a dozen members of Israel's security forces were injured in clashes in Majdal Shams. Two demonstrators were arrested and detained, but were returned to Syria.

== 5 June events ==
=== Gaza Strip ===
In the northern Gaza Strip, dozens of demonstrators tried to march towards the Erez border crossing with Israel. Hamas police had erected checkpoints to stop protesters from reaching Israel's border and clashed with protestors, arresting around a dozen who had left a rally organized in the northern town of Beit Hanun.

=== Palestinian Authority ===
At the Qalandia checkpoint in the West Bank, around 300 demonstrated in a protest that began with about 10 people forming a human chain in front of Israeli soldiers who responded with tear gas, sound bombs and rubber bullets. After they sat on the ground refusing to leave, they were forcefully removed by soldiers in riot gear and youth at the back of the crowd began throwing stones. Over the course of several hours, 120 were injured, mostly by tear gas, but also by rubber bullets, sound bombs, and a new stink spray being used for crowd control purposes. Dozens of protesters from the northern West Bank village of Deir al-Hatab also tried to march to the nearby Elon Moreh settlement.

=== Lebanon ===
Palestinian organizers in Lebanon planned for a march along the Lebanese-Israeli border for 5 June, but following a decision by the Lebanese Army to ban all protests along the border, the "Palestinian preparatory committee of the return march" canceled the protest on 3 June. Palestinian refugees in Lebanon held strikes instead. Groups independent of the Return to Palestine March Committee still attempted to reach the border, and the Lebanese army stopped a group of 20 youths in the border town of Kfar Kila.

=== Syria ===
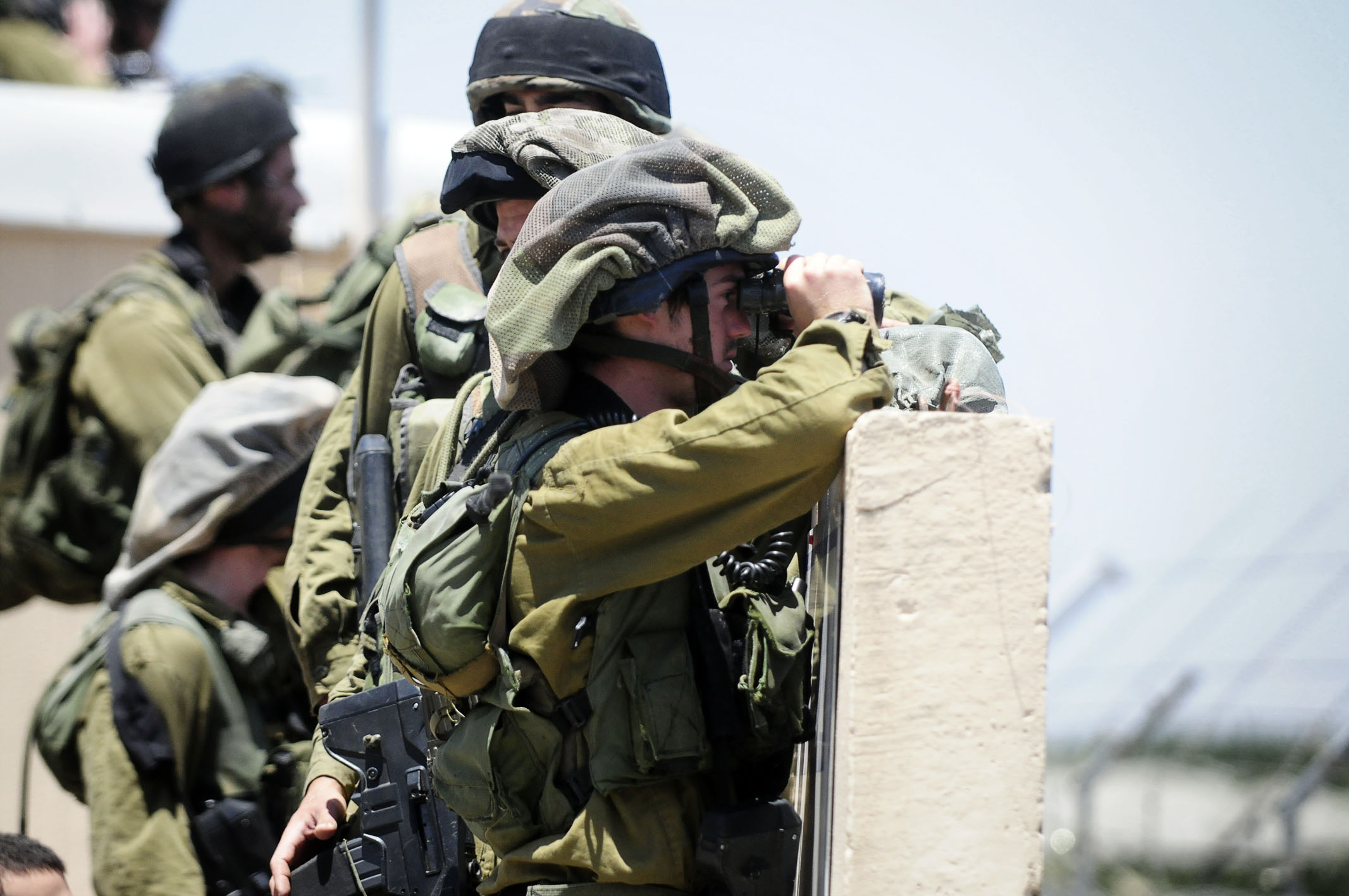
IDF photo:"IDF Soldiers Near Israel-Syria Border Following "Naksa Day" Riots"

On 5 June 2011 Palestinian and Syrian protesters moved towards the Golan Heights line of control near Quneitra and Majdal Shams. According to Syrian officials, 23 people were killed and 350 people were injured by Israeli snipers as they attempted over the course of several hours to breach the barbed-wire border. Among the dead was also reportedly an unarmed 12-year-old boy. According to Israeli officials, they counted 10 dead, none of whom were killed by Israeli fire. The New York Times said that, either way, this clash produced the greatest loss of life in the Golan since the Yom Kippur War in 1973.

Palestinians from the suburbs of Damascus were reportedly bused into the area and massed the border without interference from Syrian troops. The IDF described this as a provocation by President Bashar Assad, that was designed to distract world attention away from the ongoing "slaughter of protesters" in Syria by Assad's troops, referring to the Syrian uprising.

Israeli soldiers shouted warnings in Arabic via loudspeakers asking the Palestinians to refrain from trying to cross the frontier, adding that those who did so would endanger their lives. Israeli forces were under orders to prevent the protesters from crossing the line of control. Although no protesters managed to cross the border, the protesters thought the day was a success, as they believed that there would be outrage against Israeli troops for firing on unarmed protesters. In response the US State Department said that it was "troubled" by the loss of life, but noted that Israel has the right to defend its sovereign borders. In the aftermath, thousands began a sit-in near Golan, resulting in the Syrian government creating a security buffer zone for humanitarian purposes.

Paramedics on the Syrian side of the border asked that the IDF grant them cease-fires to clear the wounded. The army agreed to the request, but then saw activists exploiting the quiet to try to cut the border fence, bringing the truce to an end.

One of those killed, Ezzat Maswadi, was a Palestinian born in Jerusalem in 1977, who grew up in al-Eizariya. His father, who lives in al-Eizariya, could not procure a permit to travel to Damascus to attend his funeral.

The United States lobby group the Syrian Reform Party issued a statement accusing the Syrian regime of hiring Syrian protesters to storm the border to deflect attention from its own crackdown against the 2011 Syrian uprising, further claiming that protesters were paid about 1,000 dollars for protesting, with 10,000 being offered to their family if the protester was killed.

Syrian State TV reported six hours live from the incident, and it is claimed that it did not report on Syrian crackdowns during that time.

Clashes broke out at a funeral for the dead in the Palestinian refugee camp of Yarmouk in Damascus on 6 June. Allegedly angered by the PFLP-GC's refusal to take part in the protests, thousands of mourners attacked and burnt-down its headquarters in Yarmouk. PFLP-GC members opened-fire on the crowd, killing 14 Palestinians and wounding 43.

== See also ==
- Land Day
- 2018 Gaza border protests
