= Sha'ar HaNegev school bus attack =

2011 Hamas missile attack on an Israeli schoolbus

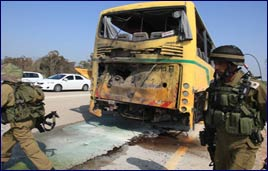
- The attack aftermath

- The attack site
- Native name: המתקפה על אוטובוס התלמידים בשער הנגב
- Location: 31°28′12″N 34°31′40″E; Negev, Israel
- Date: 7 April 2011; 15 years ago
- Target: Schoolbus
- Attack type: Laser guided missile attack
- Weapon: 9M133 Kornet anti-tank missile
- Deaths: 1 child
- Injuries: 1 civilian
- Perpetrator: Al-Qassam Brigades

The Sha'ar HaNegev school bus attack was a missile attack on 7 April 2011, in which Hamas militants in the Gaza Strip fired a Kornet laser-guided anti-tank missile over the border at an Israeli school bus, killing a schoolboy.

Hamas claimed the bus was traveling on a road used by Israeli military vehicles and it did not know that schoolchildren were on board. Israel said the yellow color of the bus made it easily identifiable and accused Hamas of "crossing a line."

The missile hit the bus after all but one of the children had been dropped off. The only remaining passenger, a 16-year-old boy, Daniel Viflic, was critically injured with shrapnel wounds to the head and died from his injuries on 17 April. The driver was lightly injured. Another mortar barrage was timed to coincide with the arrival of the paramedics, which delayed the evacuation.

The attack was condemned by the international community.

== Background ==
Hamas claimed that the attack was carried out in retaliation for the killing of three of its leaders on 2–3 April In the 48 hours prior to the attack, Palestinians had also fired a separate anti-tank missile at an Israeli target. Anti-tank missiles, unlike rockets and mortars, are extremely accurate, and their use requires more skill.

== The attack ==
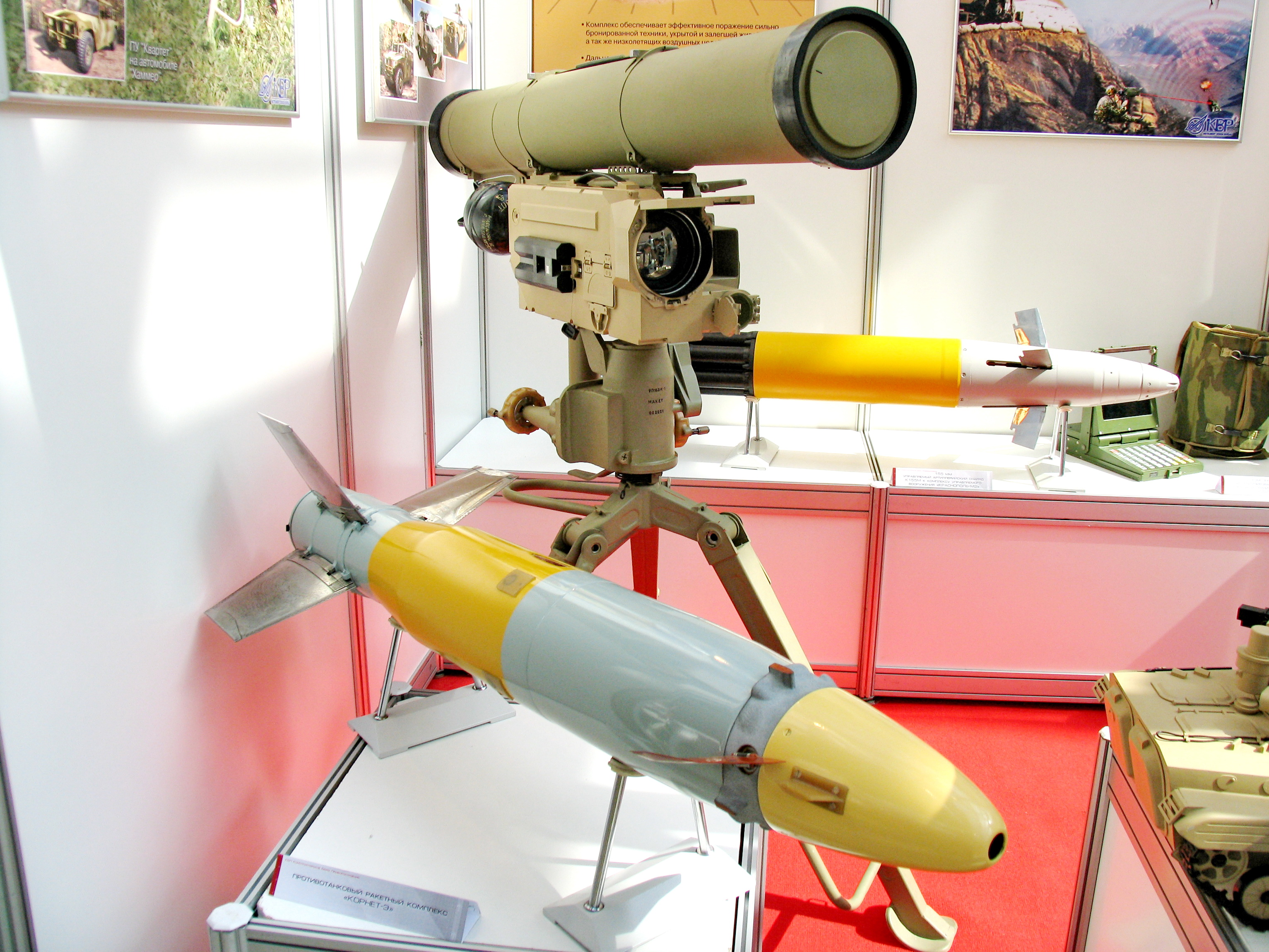
Kornet missile and launcher

On 7 April 2011 a bright yellow school bus belonging to the Sha'ar HaNegev Regional Council was dropping off students near their homes when a Hamas missile hit the rear of the bus. The bus was 50 metres past its stop at Kibbutz Sa'ad. All the children had been dropped off apart from Daniel Viflic, a 16-year-old yeshiva student from Beit Shemesh. He was critically injured by shrapnel which penetrated his brain. Viflic also suffered shrapnel wounds to head, neck and body, and massive blood loss. He temporarily stopped breathing, which prevented oxygen from reaching his brain. Viflic had been on the bus with driver Zion Yemini, a family friend. He had hitched a ride to visit his grandmother who lived in the western Negev. The driver was lightly injured in the leg, and was able to pull the bus over to the side of the road, where he carried Viflic out of the vehicle.

Paramedics arrived quickly and began resuscitating Viflic. Hamas militants launched a mortar barrage timed to coincide with the arrival of paramedics, and medics attending to Viflic had to work under heavy mortar fire. Mortar fire delayed Viflic's evacuation. He was airlifted in critical condition to Soroka Medical Center in Beersheba, where he was placed in the pediatric intensive care unit. Shortly afterward, his brain stopped functioning. Following an initial brain scan, doctors concluded that he had sustained a permanent brain injury. Doctors tried every treatment for cases of severe head trauma such as medication, special respiratory therapy, and attempts to lower his body temperature. Viflic remained in a coma on life support, showing no evidence of any brain activity. His condition was upgraded to extremely critical on 12 April. Viflic died on 17 April, ten days after the attack, as a result of a severe brain injury.

Because the Russian-made Kornet is an accurate, laser-guided weapon, it appeared that the bus was intentionally targeted. The attackers were never apprehended.

== Aftermath ==
Fears that the attack would lead to a second Gaza War did not materialize, but the incident was followed by a several-day stretch of violence in which Palestinians launched over 100 projectiles at Israel in which no Israelis were killed, and at least 20 Israeli strikes from its army, navy, and air force that left 19 dead and at least 45 wounded in Gaza by the time hostilities had ceased. Reports varied widely as to how many of the people killed were civilians versus militants: Haaretz said just two were civilians, AFP reported while the violence was still ongoing that seven civilians were killed, and the BBC just said that "many" were. The dead in Gaza included a mother and her 21-year-old daughter, a policeman, and a 10-year-old boy. Agence France-Presse reported that the interval following the bus attack included "the deadliest 24 hours of violence in the Strip since the end of the Gaza war" two years previously.

After meeting with other militant groups, Hamas agreed to enforce a ceasefire if Israel stopped firing, but both sides continued to fire. The Israeli Air Force bombed two smuggling tunnels in the northern Gaza Strip, injuring four people. Rocket and mortar fire from Gaza began a few hours later, and at least 45 additional Palestinian projectiles were fired into Israel over a three-hour period. No one was killed, but residents were instructed to stay inside their homes, children were ordered to stay inside schools, and police sealed roads in the area for fear of additional attacks. One mortar shell damaged a home in the Eshkol Regional Council, but caused no injuries. A Grad rocket fired at Ashkelon was intercepted by an Iron Dome battery, marking the first successful interception of a short-range rocket in history. Immediately afterward, an Israeli aircraft fired at the militant squad that had launched the rocket, and confirmed a hit.

The Israeli Air Force and Israeli Navy launched missile attacks on targets in Gaza, while the Israeli Army attacked Palestinian targets with artillery and tank fire. News agency Agence France-Presse reported that the effect of Israel's actions included "the deadliest 24 hours of violence" in Gaza since the Gaza War had ended, two years previously. Israeli forces had conducted more than 20 strikes by the following day. Palestinian militants fired 6 rockets and 24 mortar shells at Israel. An Iron Dome battery intercepted three rockets fired at Ashkelon; a fourth landed in an open field near the city. An Israeli aircraft fired at the Hamas cell that had launched the rockets and scored a direct hit. Israeli aircraft bombed two Palestinian militant cells east of Khan Yunis as they fired mortars at Israel. Palestinian casualties stood at 14 dead and 45 wounded. At least five were Hamas militants, and one was a policeman. Among the civilians reported killed in Gaza were a mother and her 21-year-old daughter. The Israeli military admitted that civilians had been apparently harmed in its attacks, saying that "Hamas chooses to operate from within civilian populations and uses them as human shields". Palestinian rocket fire had seriously damaged chicken coops and a factory, and damaged a residential structure in a kibbutz in the Sha'ar HaNegev Regional Council.

Concerns that this escalation might develop into a Second Gaza War did not materialize.

== Diplomatic reactions ==
Domestic

- Israeli President Shimon Peres said to United Nations Security Council ambassadors: "I was just informed that an Israeli bus carrying students from school was hit by a missile fired from Gaza. This is another example of how Gaza has turned into a terror state. Can the United Nations guarantee that terrorist acts will not happen? None of you would give up on the security of your country, and Israel will also defend itself. Hundreds of thousands of mothers and children in southern Israel cannot sleep peacefully at night as a result of the rocket fire from Gaza."

Eshkol Regional Council official Haim Yellin said: "As soon as they fire on a children's bus we say loudly: our children are not cannon fodder and they are not the hostages of any terrorist or terror organisation."

Supranational

- United Nations Secretary-General Ban Ki-moon condemned the attack and urged Israel to act with "maximum restraint."
- European Union official Catherine Ashton called for a total cessation of violence between Gaza and Israel after the IDF carried out retaliatory strikes for the school bus attack, saying she was "deeply concerned by the current escalation of violence."

International

- The French Foreign Ministry released a statement saying: "France strongly condemns the missile, rocket and mortar attacks against civilians yesterday in southern Israel. In this regard, firing an anti-tank missile at a school bus represents a new escalation. We call for an immediate halt to this violence. France deplores the humanitarian consequences of Israeli military operations in the Gaza Strip that came in response, resulting in several civilian casualties. It is urgent to end the escalation of violence in the Gaza Strip. We call on all the parties to respect a lasting truce. These events remind us, as if it were necessary, of the urgency of reaching a negotiated resolution to the conflict."
- (United Kingdom) British Foreign Secretary William Hague said: "I unreservedly condemn today's attack from Gaza on a bus carrying school children in southern Israel. The initial reports we have received suggest the bus was deliberately targeted and that a 16-year-old boy has been critically injured. This is a despicable and cowardly act that stands in stark contrast to people’s desire for peaceful reform across the region. Violence will never deliver peace. I reiterate that Hamas must halt these strikes immediately, and rein in other militant factions in Gaza. This attack further highlights Israel's legitimate security concerns. As I have made clear, Israel has every right to protect its people."

After the death of Viflic, Foreign Secretary Hague expressed his condolences to the family: "Daniel was just 16. The tragedy of his death is brought home all the more in that it occurs on the eve of Passover, normally a time of celebration for Jewish families all over the world. I would like to extend my deepest sympathies to Daniel's family, and I reiterate my utter abhorrence of the cowardly attack which cost him his life, and my call for an end to all such attacks on innocent civilians."

- (United States) A US State Department official said: "We condemn the attack on innocent civilians in southern Israel in the strongest possible terms, and on-going rocket fire from Gaza. As we have reiterated many times, there is no justification for the targeting of innocent civilians, and those responsible for these terrorist attacks should be held accountable. We are deeply concerned about reports that indicate the use of an advanced antitank weapon in an attack against civilians, and reiterate that all countries have obligations under relevant United Nations Security Council resolutions to prevent illicit trafficking in arms and ammunition."

== See also ==
- Avivim school bus massacre
- List of Palestinian rocket attacks on Israel, 2011
- Palestinian political violence
- Palestinian rocket attacks on Israel
- Ramat Eshkol bus bombing
- Shmuel HaNavi bus bombing
- Violence in the Israeli–Palestinian conflict
