= List of Palestinian rocket attacks on Israel in 2011 =

The following is a detailed list of Palestinian rocket and mortar attacks on Israel in 2011 from the Gaza Strip.

Over the course of 2011, 680 rockets, mortars and Grad missiles were fired from the Gaza Strip into Israel.

== Overview and notable developments ==
At the very end of 2010, Palestinian Islamic Jihad stated that it and other Palestinians militant groups in the Gaza Strip would temporarily halt rocket attacks against Israel. However, by 7 January, Palestinian Islamic Jihad claimed responsibility for a mortar attack that injured three agricultural workers, and the group was responsible for most of the attacks on Israel in the first two weeks of the year. On 12 January, the group declared again that it would cease firing rockets. Multiple, unclaimed rocket and mortar attacks occurred on 16, 17 and 18 January.

On 2 January, it was revealed that two East Jerusalem Arabs, employees of the British Consulate General in Jerusalem, were arrested for suspected involvement in an aborted Hamas plot to fire a missile at Teddy Stadium during a soccer match. The two were charged the following day with weapons trafficking.

On 15 March, Israel seized the Victoria, a ship containing concealed Iranian missiles destined for the Gaza Strip.

On 27 March, Israel first deployed the new Iron Dome missile defense system to protect Beersheba. The city, one of Israel's largest, had recently been targeted again by Palestinian missiles after being safe since the 2008-2009 Gaza War. A week later, a second battery was deployed to protect Ashkelon. On 7 April, the Ashkelon battery successfully intercepted a Palestinian Grad missile fired at the city, marking the first successful interception of a short range rocket in history. On 31 August, Israel deployed a third battery outside Ashdod before the new school year. As of that date, Iron Dome had intercepted several dozen Gazan rockets at an estimated cost of $100,000 per interception, not including the price of the system itself.

On 4 April, Israel indicted alleged Hamas "rocket godfather" Dirar Abu Sisi in the Beersheba District Court. Abu Sisi had reportedly been captured by Israel in Ukraine a month prior. He denied any wrongdoing.

On 7 April, Hamas militants fired a Kornet anti-tank missile at an Israel school bus. The sole passenger on board, 16-year-old boy Daniel Viflic, was killed.

On 18 August, a series of cross-border attacks were carried out in southern Israel near the Egyptian border. The initial attacks sparked several days of clashes between Israel and Palestinian militant groups that resulted in substantial casualties to both sides.

== Summary ==
This strictly summarises the content of the article below.

Month	Missiles launched		Effect of missiles		Retaliation by Israel	
	Rockets	Mortars	Killed	Injured	Killed	Injured
January	17	26		4		
February	6	19			1	17
March	38	87		3	9	8
April	87	57	1	6	8	23
May	1					
June	4	1				
July	20	2				2
August	145	46	1	30	4	2
September	8	2				
October	52	6	1	2	12	
November	11	1		1	2	6
December	30	11			4	4
Total	419	258	3	46	40	62

== January ==
According to the Israel Security Agency's monthly summary, Palestinians in the Gaza Strip launched 17 rockets and 26 mortar shells were towards Israel in 25 separate attacks. This represented a decline in number of projectiles fired from December 2010, which saw 15 rockets and 38 mortar shells launched in 30 separate attacks.

January 1

In the evening, a mortar shell fired by Palestinians in the Gaza Strip landed near a kibbutz in the Sha'ar Hanegev Regional Council. A woman suffered from shock, but no physical injuries or damage were reported. The Popular Front for the Liberation of Palestine claimed responsibility for mortar attacks that day, saying that it had fired four mortars at two military posts in Israel and adding that it would "cling to the option of resistance and confront the Israeli occupation". That night, Israel responded to the attack and to a separate attack two days earlier with airstrikes on two targets in the Gaza Strip, described by the Israel Defense Forces as a Hamas terrorist activity center in the north and a weapons manufacturing facility in the center of the territory. Palestinians said that two people were injured.

January 2

A projectile fired by Palestinians in the Gaza Strip hit the Eshkol Regional Council. The Popular Front for the Liberation of Palestine and the Democratic Front for the Liberation of Palestine claimed responsibility for attacks that day, saying they had fired several projectiles at Israeli targets late at night in response to "ongoing Israeli aggression against the people of Gaza". However, an Israeli military spokeswoman said she was not aware of any shells launched from Gaza at that time.

January 4

In the afternoon, a Qassam rocket fired by Palestinians in the northern Gaza Strip exploded near a kibbutz in the Ashkelon Coast Regional Council. No injuries were reported, but several greenhouses sustained damage. No militant group claimed responsibility. Israel responded that day with airstrikes on a Hamas militant training facility in the central part of the Gaza Strip and a smuggling tunnel in the south. No injuries were reported.

January 5

Two mortar shells fired by Palestinians in the Gaza Strip landed in open areas in the Eshkol Regional Council. No injuries or damage were reported. Five additional mortars hit the Eshkol Regional Council that day, according to the IDF website.

After nightfall, a Qassam rocket hit an open area in the Eshkol Regional Council. No injuries or damage were reported.

January 6

In the morning, a mortar shell fired by Palestinians in the Gaza Strip fell in the Sdot Negev Regional Council. No injuries or damage were reported. The Popular Front for the Liberation of Palestine claimed responsibility for mortar attacks at that time, saying that it had fired three shells at an Israeli military base near Kissufim. However, an Israeli military spokeswoman said she was not aware of any attacks in that area. Israel responded that night with airstrikes on two sites in the Gaza Strip, which it identified as a Hamas terror base in the north and an infiltration tunnel in the south intended for carrying out attacks against Israelis. No injuries were reported.

January 7

Palestinians in the Gaza Strip fired a projectile at Israel. No injuries or damage were reported.

January 8

At about 2:20 pm, Palestinians in the Gaza Strip fired four 181-millimeter mortar shells at Israel, all of which landed in the Sha'ar Hanegev Regional Council. One of the shells hit a residential area within an agricultural community in the area. Three Thai foreign agricultural workers were injured, one seriously, one moderately and one lightly, all by shrapnel. A number of other people suffered from shock. The shell also killed a cat nearby. Palestinian Islamic Jihad claimed responsibility, saying that it had fired six mortar shells at an Israeli military post near Nahal Oz.

Towards the evening, an additional Palestinian mortar shell landed in an open area in the Eshkol Regional Council. No injuries or damage were reported.

After nightfall, Palestinians fired a Qassam rocket which landed in an open area in the Eshkol Regional Council. No injuries or damage were reported.

Within an hour, Palestinians fired a second Qassam rocket into the Eshkol Regional Council. Truck driver Yitzhak Zaafrani was lightly wounded in the face and his truck was damaged.

January 9

In the morning, Palestinians fired a Qassam rocket into the Eshkol Regional Council. No injuries or damage were reported. Israel responded overnight to the attacks of the previous two days with airstrikes on two terror activity targets in the Gaza Strip. No injuries were reported. According to DEBKA, the targets were Hamas underground command centers recently built by engineers from the Iranian Revolutionary Guard.

January 10

In the evening, Palestinians in the Gaza Strip fired three rockets at Israel. One hit an industrial area in Ashkelon, while the other two fell in the Ashkelon Coast Regional Council. No injuries or damage were reported.

Later, Palestinians fired another Qassam rocket which landed in an open area in the Eshkol Regional Council. No injuries were reported.

January 11

In the morning, Palestinians in the Gaza Strip fired a rocket which exploded south of Ashkelon. No injuries or damage were reported. Israel responded overnight to the attacks of the previous two days with airstrikes on two Hamas compounds and a Palestinian Islamic Jihad militant training base.

January 16

Palestinians in the Gaza Strip fired three mortar shells at Israel, all of which exploded in an open area near a kibbutz in the Sha'ar HaNegev Regional Council. No injuries or damage were reported. The Color Red siren did not sound.

January 17

In the morning, a Qassam rocket fired by Palestinians in the northern Gaza Strip exploded in an orchard near a community in the Sha'ar Hanegev Regional Council. No injuries or damage were reported.

January 18

In the early afternoon, four mortar shells fired by Palestinians in the Gaza Strip landed in open areas in the Eshkol Regional Council. No injuries or damage were reported.

January 21

A mortar fired by Palestinians in the Gaza Strip landed in an unspecified location in the western Negev. No injuries or damage were reported.

January 25

In the evening, a Qassam rocket fired by Palestinians in the Gaza Strip fell in an open area in the Sdot Negev Regional Council. No injuries or damage were reported.

Later in the evening, a second rocket exploded in an open area in the Eshkol Regional Council. No injuries or damage were reported.

January 31

A Qassam rocket fired by Palestinians in the Gaza Strip exploded in an open area in the Eshkol Regional Council. No injuries or damage were reported.

A Grad rocket landed near a residential neighborhood in the city of Netivot. The explosion disrupted a wedding in the vicinity of the landing site; four people suffered from shock, and damage was caused to a road and a parked car. Another Grad rocket exploded near the city of Ofakim a few minutes later, but no injuries or damage were reported.

Israel responded on 2 February with an airstrike on a smuggling tunnel under the Gaza-Egypt border. No injuries were reported. Israel also submitted a letter of complaint to the United Nations.

== February ==
According to the Israel Security Agency's monthly summary, Palestinians fired 6 rockets and 19 mortar shells at Israel in 14 separate attacks.

February 4

Palestinians in the Gaza Strip fired a Qassam rocket into the Sdot Negev Regional Council. No injuries or damage were reported. The Color Red alarm did not sound.

February 6

Palestinians in the Gaza Strip fired two mortar shells into the Sha'ar Hanegev Regional Council.

After nightfall, two additional mortar shells landed in open areas in the Eshkol Regional Council. No injuries or damage were reported in either incident.

February 8

At around 11 am, two mortar shells launched by Palestinians in the Gaza Strip landed in a kibbutz in the Sha'ar Hanegev Regional Council. One projectile landed in a parking lot, damaging a car. A second landed in a nearby field and damaged a hose. No injuries were reported.

Shortly after 2 pm, two more mortars were fired at the Sha'ar Hanegev Regional Council from the northern Gaza Strip. No injuries or damage were reported. The Color Red rocket alert system sounded during both attacks and residents of the area were asked to temporarily remain in their homes. Palestinian Islamic Jihad claimed responsibility, saying the attacks were directed at a military post east of Khan Younis.

Israel responded to the attacks with airstrikes on an infiltration tunnel in the northern Gaza Strip, a rocket manufacturing facility, and a third target near Jabaliya. Palestinian sources said that eight people were lightly injured.

February 9

The Popular Front for the Liberation of Palestine said that its militants fired a projectile at an Israeli military jeep in the morning. The Israel Defense Forces said they were not familiar with the incident.

February 14

Around noon, Palestinians in the Gaza Strip fired a Qassam rocket into the Eshkol Regional Council. No injuries or damage were reported. The attack, which occurred after several days of relative calm, coincided with the swearing of Benny Gantz as new Chief of Staff of the Israel Defense Forces. Ilana Curiel of Israel News speculated that the attack was a signal by Palestinian terror groups that they would not "make life easy" for him.

February 23

Palestinians in the Gaza Strip fired three mortar shells at a kibbutz in the Sha'ar Hanegev Regional Council. One of the projectiles exploded near a soccer field, another near a pool and the third outside the border fence. No injuries were reported. The Color Red alarm did not sound. Palestinian Islamic Jihad claimed responsibility for mortars fired that day, saying it launched two shells at IDF forces which crossed the fence into the Gaza Strip.

Around 9:30 pm, Palestinians fired three Grad missiles at Beersheba, one of Israel's largest cities. One of the missiles hit the backyard of a home in a residential area, causing extensive damage to surrounding houses and vehicles. Four residents - two adults and two children - were treated for shock. No physical injuries were reported. The Color Red alarm sounded through the city mere seconds before the explosion. This marked the first time Beersheba was hit by Palestinian rockets since the 2009 Gaza War.

Israel responded that day with an airstrike on a Palestinian Islamic Jihad cell in eastern Gaza City, wounding three militants. This was followed by several airstrikes on military targets throughout the Gaza Strip, which caused heavy damage to buildings. The following day, a further airstrike on a Hamas vehicle in the Al Salaam area of Rafah killed one person and wounded several others.

February 26

A mortar shell fired by Palestinians in the Gaza Strip landed in an open area in the Eshkol Regional Council. No injuries or damage were reported. Israel responded with airstrikes on Hamas and Palestinian Islamic Jihad militant facilities in the Gaza Strip. Four Palestinians were lightly injured.

February 27

Palestinians in the Gaza Strip fired a Qassam rocket at the Eshkol Regional Council. No injuries or damage were reported. The Color Red alarm did not sound.

A mortar shell was fired from the northern Gaza Strip Israel but landed in Palestinian territory near the Erez border crossing. No injuries or damage were reported. Residents of three towns in the Shaar HaNegev and Ashkelon Coast regional councils were requested to remain in their protected spaces for fear of additional attacks.

== March ==
According to the Israel Security Agency's monthly summary, Palestinians in the Gaza Strip fired 38 rockets and 87 mortar shells at Israel in 47 separate attacks.

March 3

During the night, Palestinians in the Gaza Strip fired a projectile at the Sdot Negev Regional Council. The Democratic Front for the Liberation of Palestine claimed responsibility for the attack, saying its militants had fired a C5K rocket at an Israeli military tower near Kissufim. "We choose the option of resistance as the means to attain our national rights, and promise the Palestinian people that we will continue resistance against Israeli forces," a statement from the group said.

March 4

Palestinians in the Gaza Strip fired two Qassam rockets at Israel. One exploded in the Sdot Negev Regional Council and the other apparently landed within Palestinian territory. No injuries or damage were reported.

March 5

Palestinians in the Gaza Strip fired a rocket at an unspecified site in the western Negev. No injuries or damage were reported. Israel responded with airstrikes on Hamas militant posts in Zeitoun, Deir al-Balah and Khan Younis. No injuries were reported.

March 9

After nightfall, a Qassam rocket fired by Palestinians in the Gaza Strip landed in an open area in the Eshkol Regional Council. No injuries or damage were reported.

March 16

Palestinians fired a rocket into Sderot. No injuries or damage were reported. Israel responded with an airstrike on a Hamas compound in the Gaza Strip, killing two Hamas militants and injuring one.

March 18

Palestinians in the Gaza Strip fired four mortar shells at Israel. Some fell in unspecified locations in the western Negev, and some fell within the Gaza Strip.

Around 4 pm, Palestinian terrorists fired six additional mortar shells into the Eshkol Regional Council. No injuries or damage were reported.

March 19

In the early morning, Palestinians in the Gaza Strip fired 54 mortars on Israeli communities within a period of 15 minutes. A man and his wife were wounded by shrapnel as they fled toward a safe zone. Several homes on a kibbutz were badly damaged. One mortar shell landed on the rooftop of a kindergarten, but the building was empty because it was Shabbat, the Jewish day of rest. Hamas claimed responsibility for the attack, saying it was a response to the death of two of the group's militants in an Israeli airstrike several days earlier. According to The Telegraph, the unusually extreme attack by Hamas was an attempt by the Islamist group to divert its people's wrath and to avoid being engulfed by the Arab Spring.

Israel responded with airstrikes and tank fire, killing one Hamas official and injuring four others.

March 20

On the Jewish holiday of Purim, Palestinians in the Gaza Strip fired a mortar and two Qassam rockets at Israel.

Later in the day, Palestinians fired a Grad missile at southern Ashkelon. One elderly woman was lightly injured, and several other people suffered from shock. Sirens were heard in the city. British Minister for the Middle East and North Africa Alistair Burt condemned Hamas for its attacks on Israel as well as its assaults on Palestinian protesters in the Gaza Strip, saying: "Hamas should not think that while the attention of the world is elsewhere we will turn a blind eye to their actions. The indiscriminate targeting of Israeli citizens, as they celebrated the Jewish festival of Purim, is unacceptable."

March 21

After nightfall, Palestinians in the Gaza Strip fired a Qassam rocket at the Eshkol Regional Council. No injuries or damage were reported.

March 22

Around 4 pm, Palestinians fired four mortar shells at Alumim and Sa'ad. No injuries or damage were reported.

In the evening, Palestinians fired a Grad missile from the northern Gaza Strip and several mortar shells at Ashkelon; the Grad landed south of the city. No injuries or damage were reported.

In the evening, the Israel Defense Forces attacked a Palestinian terror cell in the midst of preparing to fire a long-range rocket into Israel, killing four terrorists. Israeli military sources said the same terrorists were behind the Grad missile attack on Beersheba on 23 February.

March 23

During the night, Palestinians in the Gaza Strip fired a Grad missile at Ashdod, which landed in an open area south of the city. This was the first time Ashdod, one of Israel's largest cities and relatively far from the Gaza Strip, was targeted since the Gaza War. Sirens were heard in the city and in nearby Gedera and Kiryat Malachi. No injuries or damage were reported. Palestinian Islamic Jihad claimed responsibility.

At 5:30 am, Palestinians launched another Grad missile at Beersheba. The rocket hit a street in the midst of a residential area. A 56-year-old man was injured by shrapnel that penetrated his third-floor apartment, and three other people suffered from shock. Several buildings, including a synagogue, were damaged. Fearing additional attacks, the city closed schools and universities for the day. Palestinian Islamic Jihad claimed responsibility, saying, "This is an initial reaction to the Zionist crimes against our people in Gaza."

Four hours later, Palestinians fired a third Grad missile at Beersheba, hitting an open area within the city.

Later, Palestinians fired seven mortar shells at the Eshkol Regional Council and one at the Shaar Hanegev Regional Council. Some of the shells contained white phosphorus.

US President Barack Obama condemned the attacks as well as a recent Palestinian terrorist bombing in Jerusalem "in the strongest possible terms", saying that "there is never any possible justification for terrorism". Israel responded to the attacks with airstrikes on terrorist training sites, weapons-smuggling tunnels under the Gaza-Egypt border, and an abandoned rocket launcher. No injuries were reported in the airstrikes.

March 24

Palestinians in the Gaza Strip fired twelve projectiles at Israeli towns throughout the day, reaching deep into the country. The Israeli cities of Beersheba, Ashdod and Kiryat Gat kept schools closed for the day, fearing additional attacks. The Ashkelon municipality held classes as usual, but the local Parents' Committee urged residents to keep their children at home. EU foreign policy chief Catherine Ashton condemned the attacks as well as the recent Palestinian terrorist bombing in Jerusalem in "the strongest terms", adding that "attacks on any civilians are completely unacceptable in any circumstance". Details of some of the attacks:

- During the night, Palestinians fired a Qassam rocket at the western Negev. No injuries or damage were reported.
- In the morning, Palestinians fired a second Qassam rocket which landed in an open area south of Ashkelon. No injuries or damage were reported.
- Shortly before 11 am, a third Palestinian rocket fired from the northern Gaza Strip exploded in an open area in the Eshkol Regional Council. No injuries or damage were reported.
- Around 12:15 pm, a fourth Palestinian Qassam rocket landed in an open area in the Sha'ar Hanegev Regional Council. No injuries were reported.
- Just before 2 pm, Palestinians fired a fifth rocket at the Eshkol Regional Council. No injuries were reported.
- Two Grad missiles were fired at Ashdod. One struck south of the city and the other to its north; the explosion of the second projectile was heard in Yavne. The Color Red alarm was heard throughout the city, as well as in Ashkelon, Gedera and Gan Yavne.
- A few hours later, a rocket landed in Sderot and a mortar exploded in the Shaar Hanegev Regional Council. The Color Red alarm sounded. No injuries or damage were reported.
- In the evening, Palestinians fired six mortar shells at the Eshkol Regional Council. No injuries or damage were reported.

Israel responded during the day with airstrikes on Hamas buildings in the Gaza Strip.

March 26

Early in the morning, Palestinians in the Gaza Strip fired two rockets into Israel. One landed in the Eshkol Regional Council, exploding three yards from a home in one of the area's communities. The house was severely damaged but the eight family members who were sleeping inside were unharmed. Another home was moderately damaged. The second rocket landed in an open area in an unspecified location. No injuries were reported.

In the evening, a third rocket hit the Eshkol Regional Council. No injuries or damage were reported.

March 27

A Palestinian Islamic Jihad cell near Jabaliya was attempting to launch a projectile into Israel when it was targeted by an Israeli airstrike. Two PIJ militants were killed and three PIJ militants were wounded.

March 29

Palestinians fired an unspecified number of Qassam rockets at Sderot, but all the projectiles fell within the Gaza strip. The Color Red alarm sounded in the Israeli city. Israel responded the following day with airstrikes on a Palestinian Islamic Jihad cell, killing one PIJ terrorist and wounding another, and on a smuggling tunnel in the southern Gaza Strip.

March 31

Around 7:30 pm, Palestinian terrorists in the northern Gaza Strip fired a Qassam rocket that landed in an open area south of Ashkelon. No injuries or damage were reported. The Color Red alarm sounded in nearby communities.

== April ==
According to the Israel Security Agency's monthly summary, Palestinians in the Gaza Strip fired 87 rockets and 57 mortar shells at Israel in 63 separate attacks.

April 5

Palestinians in the Gaza Strip fired a Qassam rocket at the Eshkol Regional Council. No injuries or damage were reported. Israel responded with airstrikes on two militant infiltration tunnels in the northern Gaza Strip. Palestinians said that four people were lightly to moderately injured. The following day Israel carried out additional airstrikes on another militant infiltration tunnel in the north and three smuggling tunnels in the south. No injuries were reported.

April 7

Palestinians in the Gaza Strip fired a Kornet anti-tank missile at a school bus in the Sha'ar Hanegev Regional Council, outside Sa'ad. In the explosion, 16-year-old boy Daniel Viflic was critically injured with a shrapnel wound to the head, and the driver was moderately injured. The boy died of his wounds ten days later. Hamas issued a press release that evening claiming responsibility, calling the incident a retaliation for a previous Israeli strike that killed three Hamas leaders and vowing further attacks. The fact that the Russian-made Kornet is a laser-guided weapon indicated that the school bus was intentionally targeted. The attack opened a several-day stretch of violence in which Palestinians launched over 100 projectiles at Israel and Israeli responses left 19 Hamas militants and two civilians dead.

Israeli President Shimon Peres said the attack showed that Gaza had turned into a terror state. The United States condemned "the attack on innocent civilians... in the strongest possible terms, saying "there is no justification for the targeting of innocent civilians and those responsible for these terrorist attacks should be held accountable." British Foreign Secretary William Hague "unreservedly" condemned the attack as "despicable" and "cowardly", and said reports suggested that the school bus was deliberately targeted.

Over the next three hours, at least 45 additional Palestinian projectiles hit Israel. Residents were instructed to stay inside their homes, children were ordered to stay inside schools, and police sealed roads in the area for fear of additional attacks. European Union foreign policy chief Catherine Ashton "strongly" condemned the attacks. Details of some of the incidents:

- One mortar hit a home in the Eshkol Regional Council. The house was damaged but no injuries were reported.
- A Grad missile fired at Ashkelon was intercepted by the Iron Dome defense system, marking the first successful interception of a short range rocket in history.
- After nightfall, three Qassam rockets were fired into the Ashkelon Coast and Eshkol regional councils. No injuries or damage were reported.

Israel responded with airstrikes on terror cells and smuggling tunnels.

April 8

Despite the announcement by Gazan terror organizations of a unilateral ceasefire at 11 pm the previous night, Palestinians fired at least 24 mortar shells and 6 rockets at Israel, causing serious damage to a factory and to chicken coops. Hamas, Fatah, Palestinian Islamic Jihad, the Popular Resistance Committees, the Popular Front for the Liberation of Palestine, the Democratic Front for the Liberation of Palestine and the little-known Abu Al-Qumsan Brigades all claimed responsibility for various attacks. Israeli children in the danger zone were held in school for safety reasons until the attacks ended. 450 schoolchildren at the "Nitzanei Eshkol" school were evacuated with a security forces escort. No injuries were reported. Details of some of the attacks:

- In the afternoon, sixteen Palestinian mortars shells exploded across southern Israel. One shell hit a chicken coop in the Eshkol Regional Council.
- Later in the afternoon four more mortar shells landed in open areas south of Ashkelon. No injuries or damage were reported.
- Four rockets were fired at Ashkelon. Three were intercepted by the Iron Dome defense system.
- In the evening, two mortar shells were fired at a kibbutz in the Shaar Hanegev Regional Council. A residential structure was damaged.

Israel responded with airstrikes, killing four Hamas militants and one Popular Resistance Committees militant.

April 9

Palestinians fired over 65 projectiles at Israel. Five people were injured while running to bomb shelters. Details of some of the attacks:

- Overnight, 15 Grads were fired into Israeli territory. The Iron Dome defense system intercepted five of them near Beersheba and Ashkelon.
- A rocket fired at a kibbutz in the Shaar Hanegev Regional Council damaged homes and a water main.
- After nightfall, two rocket barrages hit the Eshkol Regional Council.

Israel responded with airstrikes, killing two senior Hamas militants and one Popular Resistance Committees militant.

April 10

Palestinians fired about 20 rockets and mortars at Israel. Details of some of the attacks:

- In the morning, three Palestinian mortar shells hit fields belonging to a kibbutz in the Eshkol Regional Council. The projectiles damaged electrical cables, causing power outages in nearby communities.
- A Palestinian rocket hit an open area in Ashkelon.
- A Palestinian Grad missile fired at Ashkelon was intercepted by the Iron Dome rocket defense system.
- Shortly thereafter, two Palestinian rockets hit open areas in the Shaar Hanegev Regional Council and the Sdot Negev Regional Council.
- In the afternoon, a Qassam rocket exploded in an open area in the Eshkol Regional Council.
- Two mortar shells hit an open area in the Eshkol Regional Council.
- Two more mortar shells hit the Eshkol Regional Council.
- Around 9:30 pm, shortly after Palestinian militant groups announced a ceasefire, a Qassam rocket exploded in an open area in the Ashkelon Coast Regional Council.

Israel refrained from responding to the attacks.

April 12

According to the Palestinian Ma'an News Agency, al-Qaeda-affiliated Gazan militant group Tawhid and Jihad claimed to have launched two missiles at Nirim at 7:50 pm. The group said its claimed attack was "a response to Israeli aggression on the Gaza Strip", without clarifying further. However, the Israel Defense Forces said they were not aware of a rocket attack taking place at that time.

April 15

Palestinians fired two Grad missiles at Ashdod from the Beit Lahiya neighborhood of al-Atatra in the northern Gaza Strip. Alarms sounded in Ashdod and nearby Ashkelon. One rocket exploded in a residential area and the second landed outside the city. No injuries or damage were reported. Israel responded several hours later with airstrikes on militant targets. No injuries were reported.

April 18

On Passover eve, Palestinians in the Gaza Strip fired a Qassam rocket at the Sha'ar Hanegev Regional Council. It exploded in an open area near a kibbutz, and no injuries or damage were reported. The Color Red alert sounded in the area and in Sderot.

== May ==
According to the Israel Security Agency's monthly summary, Palestinians in the Gaza Strip perpetrated only one rocket attack on Israel during this month.

May 28

Overnight, Palestinians in the Gaza Strip fired a rocket at the Eshkol Regional Council. No injuries or damage were reported. This was the first such attack in six weeks.

== June ==
According to the Israel Security Agency's monthly summary, Palestinians in the Gaza Strip fired four rockets and one mortar shell at Israel.

June 15

At about 9:30 pm, Palestinians in the Gaza Strip fired a Qasssam rocket at the Eshkol Regional Council. The projectile landed in an open area, and no injuries or damage were reported. The Color Red siren sounded in the region.

June 21

After nightfall, Palestinians in the Gaza Strip fired a mortar shell at the Eshkol Regional Council, followed half an hour later by a Qassam rocket fired at the same area. No injuries or damage were reported in either attack. The incident affected an Israeli national civil defense drill the following day. Israel responded with an airstrike on an infiltration tunnel in the central Gaza Strip, causing no injuries.

== July ==
According to the Israel Security Agency's monthly summary, Palestinians in the Gaza Strip fired 20 rockets and 2 mortar shells at Israel in 18 separate attacks.

July 3

In the morning, Palestinians in the Gaza Strip fired a rocket at the Eshkol Regional Council, causing no injuries or damage. Israel responded with an airstrike on an infiltration tunnel in the northern Gaza Strip, also causing no injuries.

July 5

Mohammed Said and Kamal Abu Moamer, two members of the al-Qaeda-affiliated group Tawhid al-Jihad based in the southern Gaza Strip, were killed in an Israeli airstrike as they were preparing to launch a rocket into Israel from the central part of the Strip.

July 9

In the evening, Palestinians fired three Qassam rockets at Israel. Two rockets hit open areas in the Ashkelon Coast Regional Council; a third landed within the Gaza Strip. No injuries or damage were reported. Israel responded with an airstrike on an infiltration tunnel in the northern Gaza Strip, causing no injuries.

July 12

Around 10:15 pm, Palestinians fired two Qassam rockets at Israel. One of the rockets exploded several feet from a home in the Sdot Negev Regional Council, damaging it, while the other hit an open area in the Shaar Hanegev Regional Council. No injuries were reported. The Color Red siren sounded, and residents also received text messages asking them to enter fortified spaces. Israel responded with airstrikes on two Gazan sites identified as weapons manufacturing facilities, causing no injuries.

July 13

In the morning, Palestinians fired a rocket at the Shaar Hanegev Regional Council. No injuries were reported. Israel responded with airstrikes on two tunnels in the southern Gaza Strip and a third in the north.

July 14

In the morning, Palestinians fired a rocket at the Shaar Hanegev Regional Council. In the afternoon, Palestinians fired three more rockets at unspecified areas in Israel. In the evening, two more rockets were fired at the Shaar Hanegev Regional Council. No injuries or damage were reported in any of the attacks. Israel responded with airstrikes on four Hamas training camps in the Gaza Strip. Palestinian sources said that two children were lightly injured.

July 15

Palestinians fired a mortar shell at the Eshkol Regional Council. No injuries or damage were reported.

July 16

Overnight, Palestinians fired a rocket at the Eshkol Regional Council. No injuries or damage were reported.

July 17

Starting about 1 am, Palestinians fired three Qassam rockets at Israel. The first rocket hit the Ashkelon Coast Regional Council. Two additional rockets exploded later in the Shaar Hanegev Regional Council. No injuries or damage were reported. The Color Red alarm did not sound.

July 19

After nightfall, Palestinians fired a Qassam rocket at the Sdot Negev Regional Council. No injuries or damage were reported. Israel responded with airstrikes on terror targets in the Gaza Strip, causing no reported injuries.

July 28

In the morning, Palestinians fired a Qassam rocket at the Ashkelon Coast Regional Council. The Color red alarm sounded in the area. No injuries or damage were reported.

== August ==
According to the Israel Security Agency's monthly summary, Palestinians fired 145 rockets and 46 mortar shells at Israel in 134 separate attacks.

August 1

Palestinians fired a Qassam rocket at the Ashkelon Coast Regional Council. It exploded near a Bedouin tent, injuring 55-year-old shepherdess Fatma Saria in the lower limbs. The Color Red alarm sounded in the region.

August 3

At about 10:30pm, Palestinians fired a rocket at the Lakhish Regional Council, between Sderot and Kiryat Gat. The Abdullah Azzam Brigades claimed responsibility for the attack.

August 4

Shortly after midnight, Palestinians fired a rocket that exploded at the entrance to Ashkelon. Five people were lightly injured seeking shelter after the Color Red alarm sounded. Israel responded with an airstrike on a Hamas militant center in the Gaza Strip.

In the evening, Palestinians fired two rockets at Kiryat Gat. No physical injuries were reported, but two people were treated for shock. The Color Red alarm sounded in the city.

August 7

After nightfall, Palestinians fired a Qassam rocket at the Sha'ar Hanegev Regional Council. The rocket landed near a kibbutz, triggering the Color Red alarm.

Later, Palestinians fired three mortar shells at the Sha'ar Hanegev Regional Council, damaging a fence.

August 15

Palestinians fired a Grad rocket into Beersheba. Israel responded with airstrikes on five targets in the Gaza Strip, killing one armed Hamas terrorist and wounding several others. In a separate incident, several Palestinians were scattered by the Israeli Air Force as they were attempting to fire a rocket into Israel.

August 18

Palestinians fired two rockets at Ashkelon; at least one of them was intercepted by the Iron Dome defense system. The Popular Resistance Committees claimed responsibility. Later, two more rockets fired at Ashkelon were intercepted by Iron Dome.

August 19

Palestinians terrorists fired 17 rockets and several mortars at Israel. Responsibility for various attacks was claimed by the Popular Resistance Committees and Fatah's Al Aqsa Brigades and al-Mujahideen Brigades. The streets in Beersheba were said to be empty for fear of rockets. Details of some of the attacks:

- In the morning, a rocket fired at a Jewish religious seminary in Ashdod injured 10 people, two of them seriously. Several blocks away, a Grad rocket landed inside a synagogue while worshipers were praying, but failed to explode. There were no injuries. The synagogue was partially demolished in order to clear the rocket. The al-Qaeda-affiliated Abdullah Azzam Brigades claimed responsibility for the Grad attacks, saying they were a response to Israel's targeting of the Popular Resistance Committees leadership the previous day.
- Around 4 pm, two Grad rockets exploded between Kiryat Malachi, Gedera and Gan Yavneh. One of the rockets started a fire, damaging a building.
- Around 5 pm, a Qassam rocket hit the Eshkol Regional Council.
- Around 6:20 pm, two rockets hit Ashdod and the Sdot Negev Regional Council. No injuries or damage were reported.
- In the evening, a Qassam rocket landed near a kibbutz in the Shaar Hanegev Regional Council.
- In the evening, two mortar shells hit the Eshkol Regional Council.
- After nightfall, two rockets hit the Eshkol Regional Council. No injuries or damage were reported.
- Around 10 pm, a Grad rocket fired at Ashkelon was intercepted by the Iron Dome defense system.

Israel responded with airstrikes on four targets in the Gaza Strip, killing senior Popular Resistance Committees commander Samed Abdul Mu'ty Abed as he was on his motorcycle.

August 20

As Hamas announced it would renew attacks on Israelis, Palestinians fired 64 rockets at Israel. The projectiles reached Ashdod, Ashkelon, Beersheba and Ofakim, forcing more than half a million Israelis into bomb shelters. A Grad rocket fired at Beersheba killed 38-year-old Yossi Shoshan of Ofakim, who was on his way to ensure the safety of his 9-month pregnant wife. Many others were injured in Beersheba, Ashdod and Ofakim, including a 4-month-old baby. Details of some of the attacks:

- Around 4 am, two rockets hit the Eshkol Regional Council. No injuries or damage were reported. Palestinian Islamic Jihad claimed responsibility.
- Two rockets fired from the northern Gaza Strip hit the outskirts of Ashdod, seriously injuring three Palestinian aliens working in the local industrial zone. The three were rushed to Kaplan Medical Center for treatment. Palestinian Islamic Jihad claimed responsibility.
- Around 8:30 am, a rocket fired from the northern Gaza Strip hit an open area in the Be'er Tuvia Regional Council. No injuries or damage were reported. Palestinian Islamic Jihad claimed responsibility.
- Around 9 am, a Grad rocket landed in the Bnei Shimon Regional Council just north of Beersheba, triggering the Color Red alarm. Eight people suffered light injuries and shock. The Popular Resistance Committees claimed responsibility.
- A rocket fired at the Lachish Regional Council at noon exploded on a section of Highway 35, from Ashkelon to Kiryat Gat, severely damaging it. The highway was closed to traffic.
- Just after noon, two Qassam rockets hit the Sha'ar Hanegev Regional Council, one landing in a kibbutz and the other in an open area. No injuries or damage were reported.
- A rocket fired at Ashkelon was intercepted by Iron Dome.
- Four mortar shells were fired at the Sha'ar Hanegev Regional Council. No injuries or damage were reported.
- A Qassam rocket was fired at the Sha'ar Hanegev Regional Council and a mortar was fired at the Eshkol Regional Council. No injuries or damage were reported.
- Two mortar shells were fired at the Eshkol Regional Council. No injuries or damage were reported.
- Five mortar shells were fired at the Eshkol Regional Council. No injuries or damage were reported.
- A mortar shell was fired at the Eshkol Regional Council.
- A Grad rocket fired at Beersheba was intercepted by Iron Dome. The Popular Resistance Committees claimed responsibility.
- Five additional mortar shells were fired at the Eshkol Regional Council. No injuries or damage were reported.
- Grad rockets were fired at Ofakim. One rocket hit a home, wounding a 4-month-old baby, a 9-year-old child, and a 20-year-old man. Hamas claimed responsibility.
- A barrage of Grad rockets hit Beersheba, killing one person and injuring at least ten, four of them seriously. The Popular Resistance Committees claimed responsibility.
- Two Qassam rockets hit the Sha'ar Hanegev Regional Council.
- A Qassam rocket fired at Israel exploded within the Gaza Strip.

August 21

- In the morning, two mortar shells were fired at the Eshkol Regional Council. No injuries or damage were reported.
- In the morning, a Qassam rocket hit the Ashkelon Coast Regional Council. No injuries or damage were reported.
- In the morning, three Grad rockets fired at Ashkelon were intercepted by Iron Dome.
- In the morning, two Grad rockets were fired at Beersheba. One was intercepted by Iron Dome; the other fell in an open area near the city. No injuries or damage were reported.
- In the morning, a rocket hit a school in Beersheba, damaging it. No injuries were reported.
- In the morning, two rockets were fired at the Beersheba region. No injuries or damage were reported.
- Shortly before noon, three rockets hit near Ashkelon. No injuries or damage were reported.
- Shortly after noon, a rocket was fired at the Ashkelon Coast Regional Council. No injuries were reported.
- During the evening, a Qassam rocket was fired at Sha'ar Hanegev Regional Council. No injuries were reported.
- Though a ceasefire has been declared starting 09:00 P.M. that night, two rockets were fired after that time. No injuries were reported.

August 22

- During night, a rocket was fired at the city of Ashkelon and was intercepted by the Iron Dome defense system.
- Another rocket was fired early morning at Eshkol Regional Council. No injuries were reported.
- At night, a Qassam rocket was fired at Ashkelon and landed in an open area. No injuries were reported.
- A rocket fired at Hof Ashkelon Regional Council landed near greenhouses and started a fire. No injuries were reported.
- Another rocket landed in Hof Ashkelon Regional Council just before midnight.

August 24

Palestinians fired more than 20 rockets on Israeli communities. Grad rockets fell on the cities of Beersheba, Ashkelon and Ofakim, injuring a 9-month-old baby. Israel responded with airstrikes, killing a senior Palestinian Islamic Jihad operative involved in a recent terrorist shooting attack on Israel.

August 25

Palestinians fired at least 15 rockets and mortars at Israel. Details of the attacks:

- Five Qassam rockets were fired at the Shaar Hanegev Regional Council. No injuries or damage were reported.
- Four Qassam rockets were fired at the Eshkol Regional Council. No injuries or damage were reported.
- A Grad rocket fell in an open area near Ashkelon, without causing injuries or damage.
- A Palestinian mortar shell caused extensive damage to the Erez Crossing Terminal, which is frequently used by Palestinians to enter Israel for medical treatments.

Israel responded with airstrikes on several targets in the Gaza Strip, killing two Palestinian Islamic Jihad militants involved in the attack against the Erez Crossing Terminal.

August 26

At about 3 pm, Palestinians fired a Grad rocket at Ashkelon, despite a ceasefire announced by Palestinian Islamic Jihad the previous day. Shortly after 10 pm, two Qassam rockets were fired at the Sha'ar Hanegev Regional Council. No injuries were reported in either incident. The leftist Popular Front for the Liberation of Palestine claimed responsibility for two attacks on Ashkelon.

August 27

A Qassam rocket fell in the Negev. No injuries or damage were reported.

August 28

A Grad rocket fired was fired at Hatzerim in the Bnei Shimon Regional Council, near Beersheba. After nightfall, a Qassam rocket was fired at the Sha'ar Hanegev Regional Council. No injuries were reported in either attack. Tawhid wal-Jihad claimed responsibility for both.

August 29

A Qassam rocket was fired at the Eshkol Regional Council. No injuries or damage were reported. Tawhid wal-Jihad claimed responsibility.

August 31

Two Qassam rockets hit the Eshkol Regional Council. No injuries or damage were reported.

== September ==
According to the Israel Security Agency's monthly summary, Palestinians fired 8 rockets and 2 mortar shells at Israel in 9 separate attacks.

September 5

A rocket fell in an open area in the western Negev. There were no casualties or damage.

September 29

A rocket fired from the Gaza Strip hit the Sha’ar Hanegev Regional Council, causing damage to an abandoned building. In response, an IAF aircraft targeted a terror activity site in the central Gaza Strip overnight. A direct hit was confirmed.

September 30

IAF aircraft identified a squad of terrorists preparing to launch rockets at Israel from the northern Gaza Strip, and thwarted the attempt by firing at them. A hit was confirmed.

== October ==
According to the Israel Security Agency's monthly summary, Palestinians fired 52 rockets and 6 mortar shells at Israel in 43 separate attacks during October.

October 4

Two Grad rockets were fired from northern Gaza towards Israel. One rocket exploded in an open field in the Ashkelon Coast Regional Council while the second one fell in Palestinian territory. No injuries or damage were reported.

October 11

A Qassam rocket was fired from the northern Gaza Strip and exploded near the Ashkelon Coast Regional Council. No injuries were reported but a few green houses sustained damages.

October 26

A Grad rocket fired from Gaza landed in an open territory in the Be'er Tuvia Regional Council on Wednesday night. There were no casualties or damage, but several people suffered shock. A Color Red siren was heard in several communities including Ashdod, Kiryat Malachi, Rehovot, Ness Ziona and Gan Yavne. Israeli Air Force responded by attacking three terror activity sites and a weapons storage facility in Gaza. Direct hits were confirmed.

October 29

On Saturday, an Israeli aircraft targeted a terrorist squad in southern Gaza Strip that was preparing to launch long-range rockets. Five Islamic Jihad militants were killed, including a senior commander of the al-Quds Brigades. The squad was responsible for the firing of the Grad rocket on Wednesday. In response, more than 24 rockets were fired at Israel:

- Four rockets were fired at Ashdod, hitting near a residential building and injuring a man.
- A rocket was fired at Gav Yavne, injuring a 50-year-old man in his lower limbs.
- Two mortar shells were fired at Eshkol Regional Council.
- A mortal shell was fired at Bnei Shimon Regional Council.
- A rocket exploded in Merhavim Regional Council.
- A rocket fired at Be'er Sheba was intercepted by the Iron Dome Defense system.
- A rocket hit the city of Ashkelon.
- Two mortar shells hit Eshkol Regional Council.
- One rocket hit an apartment building in Ashkelon, killing a 56-year-old civilian.

Israel carried out additional airstrikes, hitting another squad preparing to fire rockets. Other four Islamic Jihad militants were killed.

October 30

Twelve rockets were fired into Israel since midnight. None of them caused casualties. Two rockets were intercepted by the Iron Dome defense system. Israel responded with airstrikes on several terror activity sites in Gaza, including at least three rocket-launching platforms, tunnels and a terrorist squad prepared to launch rockets, killing one DFLP militant.

October 31

A terrorist squad that fired a Qassam rocket at Israel from southern Gaza Strip was targeted by an IAF aircraft. A direct hit was confirmed. Two militants belonging to al-Ahrar, a minor split of Fatah, were killed in the strike. In the evening, Gazan militants fired five rockets at southern Israel. Two landed near Beersheba, one in Sderot and one in the Sha'ar HaNegev Regional Council, while a fifth launched against Beersheba was successfully intercepted by the Iron Dome defense system. No casualties were reported.

== November ==
According to the Israel Security Agency's monthly summary, Palestinians fired 11 rockets and 1 mortar shell at Israel in 10 separate attacks.

November 1

In the evening, a rocket launched from Gaza fell in the Eshkol Regional Council, without causing injuries or damage.

November 4

Palestinian militants fired a rocket into southern Israel, causing no injuries or damage.

November 5

An Israeli aircraft attacked Palestinian gunmen who were preparing to fire a rocket into Israel, killing one Islamic Jihad militant and injuring two.

November 6

Two rockets fired from Gaza exploded in open areas in the Hof Ashkelon Regional Council. The first rocket didn't cause injuries or damage, while the second one caused shrapnel wounds to a Thai foreign worker.

November 9

Palestinian militants fired two rockets which landed in the Sha'ar HaNegev Regional Council. No injuries or damage were reported.

November 10

A rocket was fired at night against southern Israel, causing no injuries. Israel retaliated with an airstrike against a training post belonging to Gaza militants north of Khan Yunis.

November 13

Gaza militants fired a Qassam rocket at the Sha'ar HaNegev Regional Council, causing no injuries or damage. In response, Israeli Air Force struck a naval police post in the northern part of Gaza City, leaving one Palestinian dead and four wounded.

November 15

Gaza terrorists launched two Qassam rockets at Israeli communities in the western Negev. One rocket hit a local kindergarten. There were no physical injuries in the attack, but the kindergarten was badly damaged. The other rocket exploded in an open area, causing no injuries or property damage. In response, overnight Israel struck terror targets in northern Gaza. Direct hits were recorded on a terror tunnel and on an additional center of terrorist activity.

November 26

A rocket fired from Gaza hit the Eshkol Regional Council, causing no injuries or damage. In response, Israeli aircraft struck two terror activity sites in southern and central Gaza Strip.

== December ==
According to the Israel Security Agency's monthly summary, Palestinians fired 30 rockets and 11 mortar shells at Israel in 30 separate attacks.

December 7

Israeli aircraft targeted two Palestinian squads that were preparing to fire rockets into southern Israel, killing one Islamic Jihad militant and wounding two others.

December 8

An Israeli aircraft killed a senior operative of the al-Aqsa Martyrs' Brigades and another terrorist in Gaza who intended to execute a terrorist attack against Israeli civilians and IDF soldiers. In response, Gaza militants fired several rockets. A Grad missile exploded in an open field near the southern city of Beersheba and a Qassam landed in an open field in the Sdot Negev Regional Council. No injuries or damages were reported in either incident. In response, at least two Israeli airstrikes took place against Hamas facilities next day, killing one civilian and injuring several. Other nine rockets were fired at Israel, causing no injuries or damage:

- Five rockets landed in western Negev.
- A rocket exploded in the Eshkol Regional Council.
- A rocket exploded in Netivot.
- Two rockets landed south of Ashkelon.

December 9

Six rockets fired from the Gaza Strip exploded in southern Israel:

- Two rockets exploded in the Hof Ashkelon Regional Council.
- Two rockets exploded in the Sha'ar Hanegev Regional Council.
- Two rockets were fired towards the Be'er Tuvia Regional Council. An Iron Dome anti-rocket defense battery intercepted one of the rockets.

No injuries or damage were reported in either incident. In response, Israeli aircraft struck targets associated with terrorist activity in Gaza next day.

December 11

In response to ongoing rocket fire, Israeli aircraft targeted a weapon manufacturing site in northern Gaza.

December 24

A rocket fired from the northern Gaza Strip exploded in an open field in the Hof Ashkelon Regional Council. A short while later a mortar shell hit an open field in the Eshkol Regional Council. No injuries or damage were reported in either incident.

December 27

After an Israeli airstrike killed three Islamic militants and injured ten, Palestinians fired a Qassam rocket from inside Gaza but it exploded inside the Strip.

December 28

Four Qassam rockets fired from the Gaza Strip exploded in open areas in the Western Negev. Hours later, Israeli jets bombed a smuggling tunnel in northern Gaza and a terrorist center in central Gaza.

December 29

A rocket launched from the Gaza Strip exploded in an open area of the Eshkol Regional Council. No injuries or damage were reported.

December 30

An Air Force jet carried out a strike against a rocket cell in northern Gaza seconds before it fired rockets at Israel, killing one terrorist and injuring five.
