= Avraham Tiar =

Israeli politician

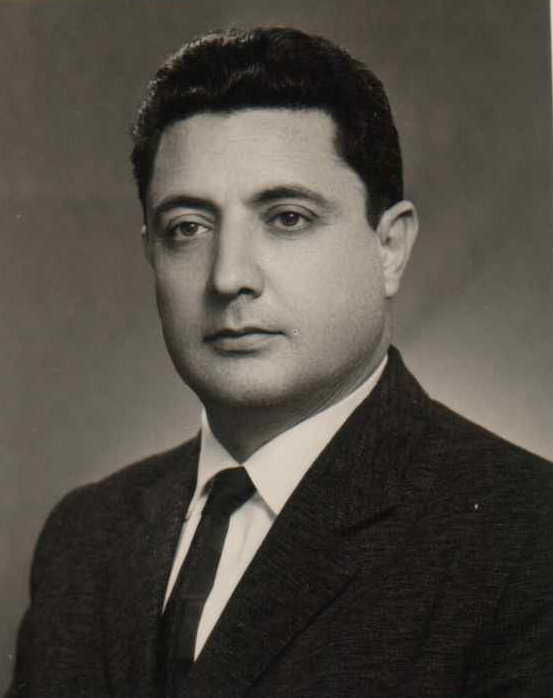
- Tiar in the 1960s

Faction represented in the Knesset
- 1961–1965: Herut
- 1965–1967: Gahal
- 1967–1969: Free Centre

Personal details
- Born: 29 January 1924; Gabès, Tunisia
- Died: 25 April 2011 (aged 87); Israel

Avraham Tiar (Hebrew: אברהם טיאר; 29 January 1924 – 25 April 2011) was an Israeli politician who served as a member of the Knesset for Herut, Gahal and the Free Centre between 1961 and 1969.

== Biography ==
Born in Gabès in Tunisia, Tiar joined Betar at the age of 13, and by 1942 was head of the Gabès branch. In 1946 he became general secretary of the Tunisian Betar movement, as well as being deputy chairman of Revisionist Party in the country. He made aliyah to Mandatory Palestine on the S.S. Ben Hecht ship in March 1947, but was intercepted by the British, and sent to an internment camp in Cyprus. Tiar was released from custody in April 1948.

He studied law at the Hebrew University of Jerusalem, and was certified as a lawyer.

== Political and public career ==
In 1948, Tiar was amongst the founders of Herut. In 1956, he became a member of its central committee. He was elected to the Knesset on the party's list in 1961, and in the same year became secretary of the party's Haifa branch. Between 1963 and 1966 he was chairman of the party's youth leadership.

After being re-elected in 1965 on the Gahal list (an alliance of Herut and the Liberal Party), Tiar was amongst the three Gahal members to break away from the party and establish the Free Centre in March 1967, before losing his seat in the 1969 elections. He later left the Free Centre and returned to Herut in 1977.

Outside of the Knesset, Tiar was a founder of the Blue-White faction in the Histadrut. He later chaired the Free Centre's faction in the trade union, and served as editor of its magazine, New Age.

Between 1979 and 1982 he worked in Europe as the head emissary of the Jewish Agency.
