= Michael Schor =

Israeli engineer

Michael Schor מיכאל שור
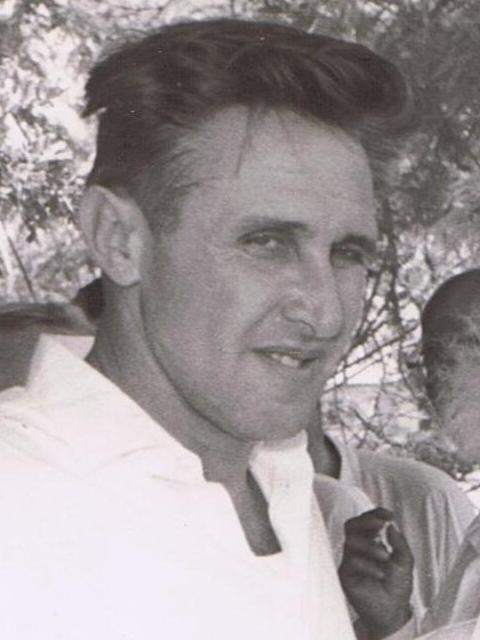
- Michael Schor in 1959 at Israel Defense Prize Ceremony
- Born: December 25, 1920; Odessa, Soviet Union
- Died: September 26, 2011 (aged 90); Israel
- Occupation: Scientist

Michael Schor (Hebrew: מיכאל שור; 25 December 1920 – 26 September 2011) was an Israeli engineer who served for 17 years as the CEO of Israel Military Industries (IMI), and was twice the recipient of the Israel Defense Prize.

== Biography ==
Schor was born in Odessa in the Soviet Union. In 1938, he immigrated to the British Mandate for Palestine (now Israel). Schor joined the Haganah forces and integrated into its arms industry. After completing his studies of chemical engineering at the Technion in 1945, he worked as an experiments engineer in the military industry. After the 1948 Arab–Israeli War, Schor managed the IMI materials plant, and for his work there he was awarded the 1959 Israel Defense Prize. In the 1960s, Schor managed the IMI Department of explosives. In 1967 he was appointed as the deputy director of the IMI while continuing to manage the IMI Department of explosives. In July 1972, Schor was appointed as the CEO of the Israel Military Industries, a position which he maintained until 1989. Afterwards he was a chairman in the IMI during the years 1990–1991. After his retirement, Schor was awarded the 1991 Israel Defense Prize for lifetime achievement.

In 1985, Schor was awarded an honorary Doctor of Science from the Technion for his unique contribution to the development of the military industries in the field of engineering, management and economics, and in recognition for his part in the strengthening of the Israeli defense establishment.

Married Gabriela and the two share 4 children. Their third child, Arik Schor, was the CEO of Tnuva.

Schor died in 2011 at the age of 91.
