= Arieh Handler =

Arieh Handler (Hebrew: אריה הנדלר; May 27, 1915 – May 20, 2011) was a Zionist leader. He was one of the founders of the Religious Zionist movement in the UK. He was present at the Israeli Declaration of Independence.

== Biography ==
Arieh Handler was born in Bohemia and grew up in Germany. As a young man, he was active in helping Jews escape from Germany in the years leading up to the Holocaust. In the 1930s, he came to Britain and was one of the founders of the British branch of the Religious Zionist youth movement Bnei Akiva. He was also the President of the Religious Zionist organisation Mizrachi.

Shortly before the establishment of the State of Israel, Handler made aliyah and developed close friendships with many Zionist leaders. As a representative of the Religious Zionist movement, he attended many high-level secret meetings of the Zionist leadership in the lead-up to the establishment of the state. He was invited by David Ben-Gurion to attend the declaration of independence ceremony in Tel Aviv. Before his death in May 2011, Handler was the last living person to have been present at this event.

Handler lived in London for many years, carrying out various assignments for the Israeli government and Zionist institutions. He was involved in building up the Zionist movement in Britain and was close to Harold Wilson.

In 2006, Handler returned to Israel. He lived until his death in the Kiryat Moshe neighbourhood of Jerusalem.
