= Gavriel Tsifroni =

Israeli journalist

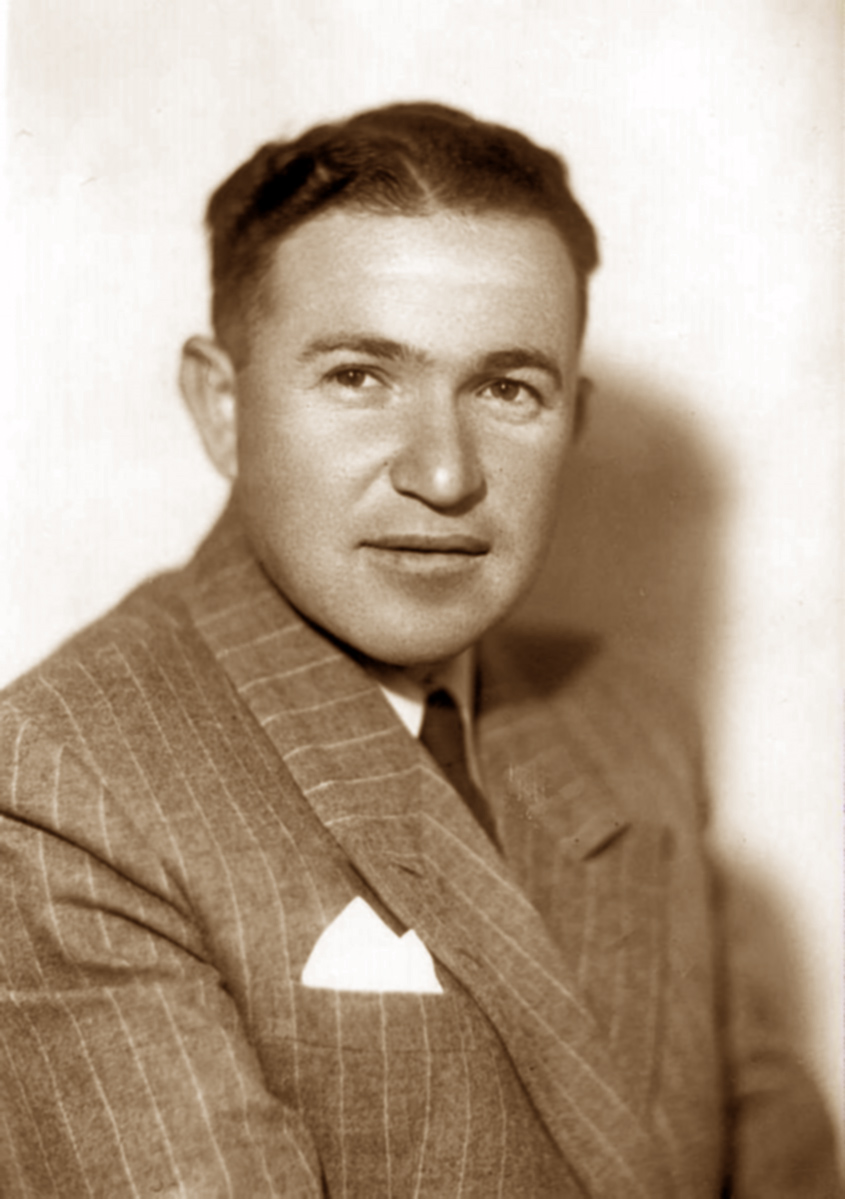
Gavriel Tsifroni, circa 1940s or 1950s

Gavriel Tsifroni (Hebrew: גבריאל צפרוני; 1914 – 7 June 2011) was an Israeli journalist.

== Biography ==
Tsifroni was born in Vilna in 1914. At the age of three he immigrated to Mandate Palestine with his family, which moved to Tel Aviv. From the age of 14 he worked in a bakery delivering bread to the residents of the town. At the age of 16 he began working as a journalist in the Hebrew newspaper "Hazit HaAm", and later on for the Hebrew newspaper "Do'ar HaYom". He worked as a reporter of the "Daily Telegraph" and the "HaTzofe". In 1935, he began working for the Hebrew newspaper "HaBoker", initially as a reporter in Tel Aviv, and afterwards as a branch manager in Jerusalem.

In 1962, Tsifroni was appointed as the editor of the "HaBoker" newspaper, and he served in this position until the newspaper was shut down in 1965. Between 1969 and 1977, he served as a CEO of the Habima Theatre in Tel Aviv.

Tsifroni was married to Shulamit Tsifroni (1917 - 2008) née Abulafia, and together they had one daughter.

Tsifroni died on 7 June 2011, at age 96.
