= Haim Yisraeli =

Israeli civil servant

- חיים ישראלי
- Born: 1927; Motal, Belarus (then Poland)
- Died: 7 June 2011 (aged 83–84)
- Occupation: Senior civil servant
- Known for: Long service in the Israeli Ministry of Defense
- Notable work: Autobiography (2005)
- Awards: Israel Prize (1998)

Haim Yisraeli (Hebrew: חיים ישראלי; 1927 – 7 June 2011) was a senior Israeli civil servant.

== Biography ==
Yisraeli was born in 1927 in the town of Motal in Belarus (then part of Poland). He was named after his uncle Rabbi Meir Haim Dolenko (1882–1917), the rabbi of Motal (who died in his prime during the First World War from typhus).

Following the Soviet annexation of Eastern Poland, Yisraeli's family was exiled to Kazakhstan and, as a result, his family avoided the fate of the majority of the Jewish residents of the town whom were murdered by the Nazis during World War II. Following the war, the family received permission to move to Poland and, soon afterwards, they contacted the Berihah network. They subsequently reached a transit camp in Germany, where Yisraeli met his future wife, Sarah. From the transit camp, the family managed to flee to Mandate Palestine.

After Yisraeli arrived in Palestine, which was later to become the State of Israel, he was not drafted to the IDF for health reasons. As a result, he was initially assigned to work temporarily in the archive of the Prime Minister's Office. He later managed to convince the doctors in the IDF recruiting office to enlist him, and, in 1950, he was sent to work, as part of his military service, in the Israeli Ministry of Defense.

Yisraeli became a close aide of Nehemia Argov, the military Adjutant of the Defense Minister and first Prime Minister, David Ben-Gurion, and, during his career, he worked in the service of 14 defense ministers.

Yisraeli's autobiography was published in 2005.

== Awards ==
- In 1998, Yisraeli won the Israel Prize, for his special contribution to society and state, presented during the 50th Independence Day celebrations in Israel.

== See also ==
- List of Israel Prize recipients
