= Dirar Abu Seesi =

Palestinian engineer

- ضرار أبو سيسي
- Born: 1969 (age 56–57); Jordan
- Occupation: Engineer
- Children: 6

Dirar Abu Seesi or Abu Sisi (Arabic: ضرار أبو سيسي; born in 1969 in Jordan) is a Palestinian engineer. Abu Seesi was a deputy engineer for the Gaza Strip's sole electrical plant, which provides 25% of Gaza's power. According to Israel, he was also a weapons engineer for the Palestinian Hamas organization. In February 2011, he traveled to Ukraine, his wife's native country, to apply for citizenship, after coming to believe that Gaza was no longer a safe place to raise his six children. He disappeared in Poltava on February 19, and later turned up in an Israeli prison after being kidnapped by Mossad Israeli intelligence personnel. On April 4, 2011, he was indicted for his work for Hamas and was convicted on March 30, 2015, in a plea bargain. He is known by Israeli security services as the "father of the rockets".

== Abduction ==
On the evening of February 18, after formally filing the papers for citizenship, Abu Seesi was traveling by train to the Kyiv airport for a reunion with his brother Yussef, who was residing in the Netherlands and whom he had not seen in 15 years. Just outside the city of Poltava, two men, who the family believes were Ukrainian security agents, entered the train and removed Dirar. After that, he disappeared. His wife Veronika, who was in Ukraine at the time as well, did not hear from him for a week. During that period of silence, she summoned the Ukrainian press and made allegations that the Mossad had kidnapped him. On February 27, the Palestinian Interior Ministry demanded that the Ukrainian Interior Ministry disclose the reasons for his disappearance.

Dalia Kerstein, executive director of the Israeli human rights NGO, HaMoked, confirmed that the Gazan engineer was in an Israeli prison. Kerstein identified Abu Seesi's Israeli attorney Michal Orkabi, who confirmed that she represented him, but she could provide no further information due to a security gag order imposed by the Petah Tikva Magistrates' Court preventing her from speaking about the case. On March 20, the gag order was partially lifted with Israel admitting it was holding Abu Seesi.

The United Nations High Commission for Refugees became involved in the case when it determined that Abu Seesi was classified as a refugee. An Associated Press article revealed that the UNHCR's Ukrainian representative asked Ukraine to account for any role its own officials may have played in the disappearance.

Veronika Abu Seesi claimed that Israel kidnapped him because he was the "brain of the power system" and that he had rebuilt it himself after it was destroyed during Operation Cast Lead in 2009. The Wall Street Journal and The Washington Post both reported that Abu Seesi had devised a technique enabling the plant to run solely on diesel fuel supplied by Egypt, thus enabling it to no longer be dependent on Israel for its sole source of fuel. The German weekly Der Spiegel indicated that Abu Seesi's abduction was owing to information he had in relation to missing Israeli soldier Gilad Shalit, who was being held by Palestinian militants in Gaza. Israeli Prime Minister Benjamin Netanyahu, in a live interview with YouTube World View and Channel Two News, said that Abu Seesi is a Hamas man being held in Israel, and he disclosed valuable information. Israeli officials were insinuating earlier that Abu Seesi was involved in weaponry for Hamas. Israel held Abu Seesi in isolation, denying him family visits, under its security protocol.

== Trial ==
On April 4, 2011, Abu Seesi was indicted in the Beersheba District Court, charged with "membership in a terrorist organization, conspiracy to commit a crime, and the production of illegal weaponry, assistance to an illegal organization and other various crimes". According to the indictment, Abu Seesi was the central developer of the Qassam rocket, among other rockets and anti-tank missiles, was responsible for upgrading older rockets for Hamas and served as the commander of Hamas' Izz ad-Din al-Qassam Military Academy.

According to the indictment by Shin Bet, the Israel Security Agency, Abu Seesi was recruited into Hamas in 2002 by Sheikh Nizar Rayan. He was asked by Salah Shehade to work to develop weapons for Hamas. Working under Mohammed Deif, the supreme commander of Hamas' military wing, "Abu Sisi was responsible for electrical engineering and dealt mostly with developing boosters and fins that stabilized and enhanced rocket propulsion. These are two factors that are key for increasing a rocket's range and subsequent penetration of a target. In 2005, Abu Seesi was asked by the committee to begin working on increasing the range of rockets that were manufactured domestically in the Gaza Strip. In his work for Hamas, he was able to increase the range of the rockets from six to nine kilometers, and subsequently to 15 kilometers. In 2007, Abu Seesi assisted Hamas in increasing the range of their rockets to 22 kilometers. He was then asked by Hamas to increase the range to between 37 and 45 kilometers, and participated in several experiments during which rockets were tested and fired into the Mediterranean." Under the command of Deif and Ahmed Jabari, Abu Sisi founded a military academy that taught "military tactics and techniques," and "human resources management, time management, crisis management, and general administration."

On March 30, 2015, Abu Seesi was convicted in the Beersheba District Court after pleading guilty as part of a plea bargain arrangement. As part of the deal, the prosecution asked for 21 years imprisonment. While the charges of attempted murder were dropped, other charges such as planning to commit murder, producing weapons, and activity in a terror organization, remained. In July 2015, Abu Seesi was sentenced to 21 years in prison.

== See also ==
- List of kidnappings
- Lists of solved missing person cases
