= 2011 Jerusalem bus stop bombing =

Terrorist incident in Jerusalem

- Location: 31°47′16″N 35°12′11″E; Jerusalem
- Date: 23 March 2011; 15:00 (GMT+2)
- Attack type: Bombing
- Deaths: 1 Israeli, 1 British civilian
- Injuries: 39 civilians
- Perpetrator: Hamas
- Motive: Antisemitism

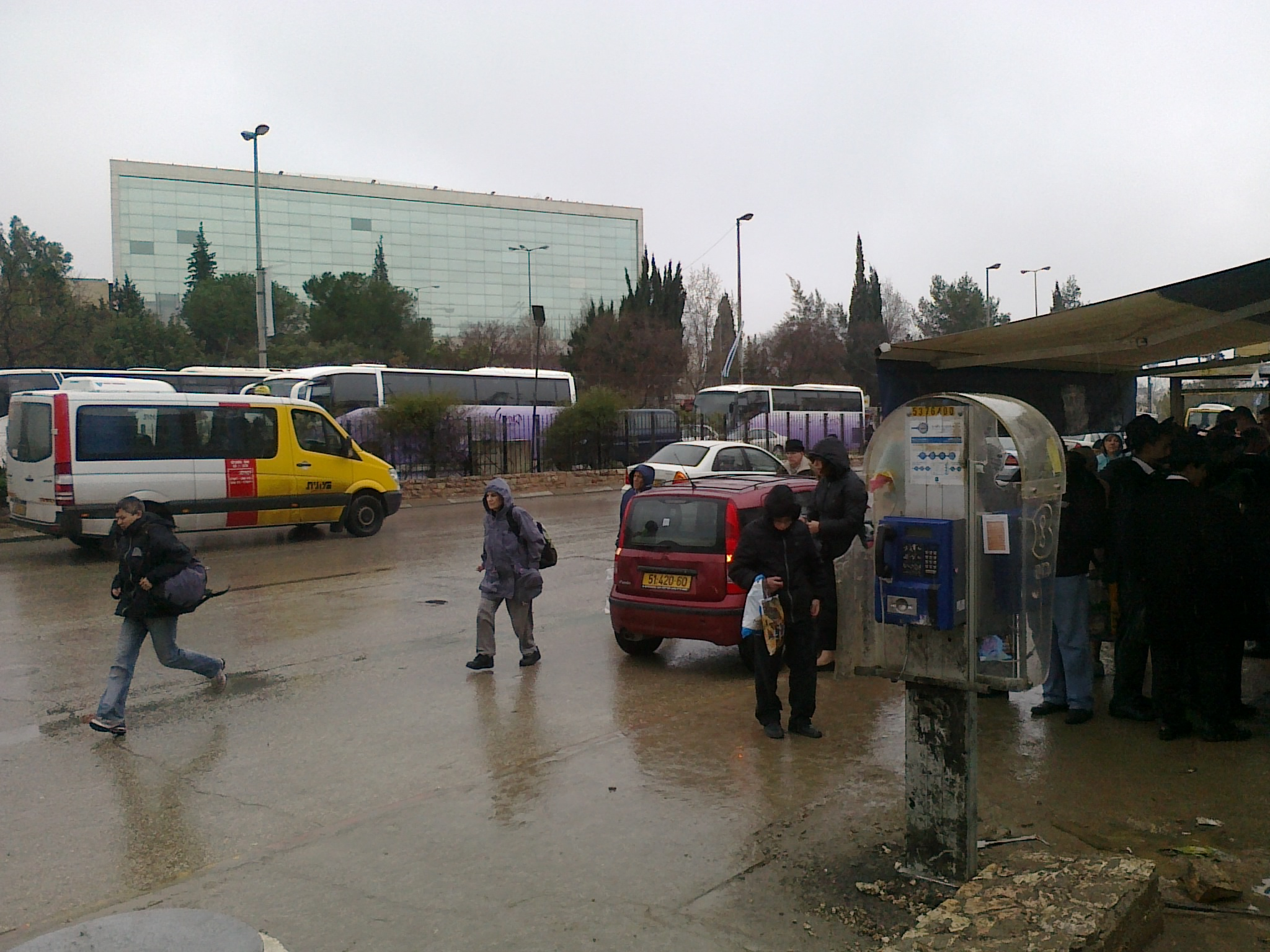
Site of the attack. The photo was taken a day after the attack. The damage from the blast is evident on the Payphone unit.

A bomb attack was carried out in a bus station in downtown Jerusalem, near the Jerusalem International Convention Center compound on 23 March 2011 at 15:00 (GMT+2). The bomb was placed near a bus stop, and detonated when Egged bus No.74 passed the station.

The explosion killed 2 people, a British national: 59-year-old Mary Jean Gardner, a Scottish Christian Bible translator who was studying Hebrew at the Hebrew University of Jerusalem's Rothberg International School and Hodaya Asulin who died 6 years later on 22 November 2017, she was 14 at the time of the bombing. The bombing also injured 39 people.

The attack was condemned by officials of Israel, the Palestinian Authority, France, the United Kingdom, and the United States. Spokespeople for the Palestinian Islamic Jihad and Hamas, in contrast, praised the attack.

The Israeli Police said the bombing was a "terrorist attack." The perpetrators were not immediately identified. The Palestinian Authority brought in for questioning two Palestinian Islamic Jihad leaders, related to Israeli claims that the organization's Al-Quds Brigades were responsible for the attack. In September 2011, Israel arrested four Hamas militants, one of whom is an Israeli permanent resident from Jerusalem. The four are currently on trial by an Israeli military court for their role in the bombing.

== Background ==
Two weeks before the attack, a pipe bomb exploded in a garbage bag on a traffic island in southern Jerusalem. A municipal sanitation worker lost his hand in the blast. Jerusalem had not suffered any serious terrorist attack since 2008, and has not experienced any suicide bombing attacks in 7 years, as a result of effective prevention.

Jewish Week columnist and Jerusalem resident Carol Ungar remarked the attack ended "a decade of quiet, of voluntary amnesia" for adults as well as period where children could grow up without any knowledge of such events.

== Attack ==
On 23 March 2011, around 15:00, an explosive device was placed in a bag next to a bus station in downtown Jerusalem, near where many passengers await their bus. The explosive device contained between one and two kilograms of explosives, and was packed with shrapnel. David Amoyal, owner of a nearby kiosk, who noticed the suspicious bag had been placed near the bus station, immediately told a group of people nearby to evacuate the site, and attempted to alert the police.

A few minutes after 15:00, while Amoyal was attempting to alert the police, the device exploded near Egged bus # 74, which was passing the site and which absorbed the force of the blast.

The explosion injured 39 people. In addition, it killed Mary Jean Gardner. She was a Scottish 56-year-old student at the Hebrew University of Jerusalem's Rothberg International School, who absorbed most of the blast and later died of her wounds in the Hadassah Ein Kerem hospital. Gardner was a Christian Bible translator, who had for 20 years translated the Bible into the Ifè language in the African nation of Togo. Danny Ronning of the Home for Bible Translators said he was certain that because Gardner absorbed the majority of the bomb's shrapnel, she shielded and saved the lives of three children.

ZAKA, a community emergency response team of volunteers, were the first to arrive on the scene. They began medical treatment on two injured women.

== Perpetrators and investigation ==
The Israeli Police said the bombing was a "terrorist attack." The identity of the individual perpetrators of the attack was not immediately known, and no group claimed responsibility.

Two Palestinian Islamic Jihad leaders in Jenin, Khalid Jaradat and Tariq Qa'dan, were brought in for questioning by the Palestinian Authority. Islamic Jihad said that the questioning was related to Israeli claims that the organization's Al-Quds Brigades were responsible for the attack.

Subsequent to a wave of arrests made in September 2011, four Hamas militants are being tried in an Israeli military court for involvement in the attack. Three of the militants are accused of having recruited the fourth, a resident of East Jerusalem. The cell is accused of having also planned a suicide attack.

== Reactions ==
Israeli and Palestinian Authority

- Israel – Prime Minister Benjamin Netanyahu delayed a planned trip to Moscow as a result of the bombing.
  - Jerusalem mayor Nir Barkat condemned the "cowardly terrorist attack."
- Palestinian Authority – Prime Minister Salam Fayyad condemned the attack.

Other states

- France – Foreign Minister Alain Juppe condemned the attack "in the strongest possible terms," and expressed sympathy for "the victims, their families and loved ones, and the Israeli authorities."
- United Kingdom – Foreign Secretary William Hague stated,
  This appears to have been a callous and disgusting act of terrorism directed against innocent civilians which I condemn unreservedly. I would like to express the UK's unwavering support for the Jewish people of Israel in their homeland in the face of such horrific acts.
- USA
  - US President Barack Obama declared,
    I condemn in the strongest possible terms the bombing in Jerusalem today, as well as the rockets and mortars fired from Gaza in recent days. Together with the American people, I offer my deepest condolences for those injured or killed... There is never any possible justification for terrorism. The United States calls on the groups responsible to end these attacks at once and we underscore that Israel, like all nations, has a right to self-defense.
  - Defense Secretary Robert Gates said, "It's obviously a horrific terrorist attack. I extend sympathy to the families of those who have been injured. But I think, I don't think I would characterize the situation there as deteriorating."
  - Secretary of State Hillary Clinton said that Israel: "like all nations, of course, has to respond when this occurs."

Palestinian militant organizations

- Palestinian Islamic Jihad – Spokesman Abu-Ahmed praised the attack, saying it was a "natural response to the enemy's crimes... It's a clear and powerful message to Israel that her crimes won't be able to break the resistance".
- Hamas – welcomed the attack.

Non-governmental organizations

- Amnesty International – condemned the bombing. The group stated that "all attacks targeting civilians-wherever, whenever and by whomever they are carried out-are prohibited absolutely under international law." It also urged the Israel Defense Forces to cease firing mortars on Gazan areas with residential neighborhoods.

== See also ==
- Shmuel HaNavi bus bombing
- Kiryat Menachem bus bombing
- Patt junction bus bombing
- Dizengoff Center suicide bombing
