= Naksa Day =

Annual day of commemoration for Palestinians

- Significance: Naksa
- Date: 5 June
- Next time: 5 June 2027
- Frequency: Annual
- Related to: Jerusalem Day

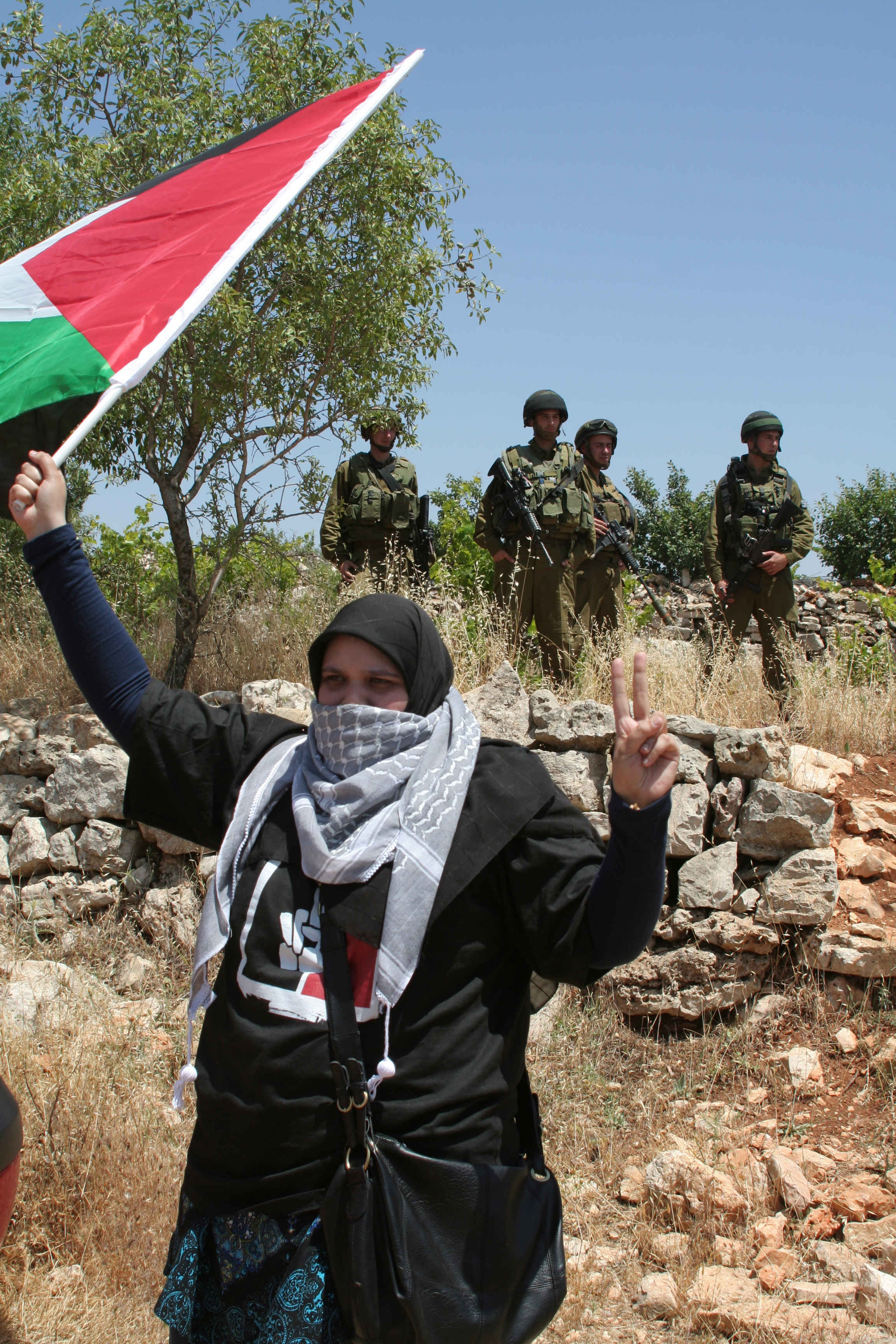
An activist demonstrating in Beit Ommar to commemorate Naksa Day

Naksa Day (Arabic: يوم النكسة, Yawm an-Naksa, meaning "day of the setback") is the annual day of commemoration for the Palestinian people of the displacement that accompanied Israel's victory in the Six-Day War on 5 June 1967. As a result of the war, Israel took control of the Palestinian-populated West Bank and Gaza Strip, which were previously annexed by Jordan and controlled by Egypt, respectively.

The first displacement, known as the Nakba, took place during and after the 1948 Palestine war. It is marked annually on Nakba Day on 15 May.

== 2011 Naksa Day demonstrations ==
Following the 2011 Nakba Day demonstrations on 15 May in which violence ensued resulting in at least 13 Palestinians killed during border clashes, as well as an Israeli killed in Tel Aviv in an alleged ramming attack by an Israeli-Arab driver, activists organized further demonstrations for Naksa Day on 5 June 2011.

While Lebanon banned activists from approaching the border, Palestinian demonstrators once again rushed the Syrian border with Israel near Quneitra and Majdal Shams. Earlier that morning, Palestinians from the suburbs of Damascus were reportedly bused into the area and massed the border without interference from Syrian troops.

Despite warnings from the Israel Defense Forces (IDF) not to cross the frontier into Israel, the activists ignored their calls and crossed the Syrian border fence. According to the IDF, when the demonstrators did not stop, Israeli forces shot at their lower bodies. While the IDF reported 12 known injuries, Syrian television claimed 23 activists were killed and 350 wounded.

An Israeli official stated that it was clear that the Syrian government "gave the green light for the protesters to move toward the border, and contrasted this with the situation on Sunday in Lebanon, where the border was quiet." He said the clashes served as a means for the Syrian government to distract from its own domestic problems, namely the Syrian Civil War. In response the United States Department of State said that it was "troubled" by the loss of life, but Israel has the right to defend itself, like any sovereign nation. Syrian-State-owned newspaper published an article warning Israel that 600,000 Syrian refugees march "to their villages and fields, from which they were removed by the occupation of the Golan Heights".

== See also ==
- 1949–1956 Palestinian exodus
- Palestinian exodus from Kuwait (1990–91)
