= 2010 in Israel =

- Decades: 1990s; 2000s; 2010s; 2020s
- See also: History of Israel; Timeline of Israeli history; List of years in Israel

Events in the year 2010 in Israel.

== Incumbents ==
- President of Israel – Shimon Peres
- Prime Minister of Israel – Benjamin Netanyahu (Likud)
- President of the Supreme Court – Dorit Beinisch
- Chief of General Staff – Gabi Ashkenazi
- Government of Israel – 32nd Government of Israel

== Events ==
July 26: 2010 Israeli helicopter disaster in Romania
- 29 May – Harel Skaat represents Israel at the Eurovision Song Contest with the balad “Milim” ("Words").
- June 16 – Israel Defense Forces soldiers stop three armed men entering Israel from Egypt, 40 kilometres north of the Israeli city of Eilat. One of them is killed, and the other two flee, leaving behind an explosive device.
- June 17 – Immanuel Beit Yaakov controversy – Haredi parents of girls in the West Bank settlement of Immanuel begin a two-week jail sentence after the parents refused to follow an Israeli Supreme Court order, without a trial, requiring their daughters to return to the original school. This imprisonment is followed by mass protests in Jerusalem and Bnei Brak by both religious and secular Israelis who oppose judicial activism.
- June 22 – The Israeli reconnaissance satellite Ofek-9 is launched from the Palmachim Airbase.
- July 5 – Echad Ha'am 101 sitcom first episode is broadcast.
- July 10 – A new bill is introduced in the Knesset that would force Haredi Jewish schools to teach core subjects such as mathematics, science, English, and civics, or lose state funding.
- July 26 – 2010 Israeli helicopter disaster in Romania: Six Israeli Air Force (IAF) officers (four pilots and two mechanics) and one Romanian Air Force officer die when an IAF Sikorsky CH-53 Sea Stallion helicopter (known in Israel as a "Yasur") crashes, during a joint Israeli-Romanian aviation exercise in the Carpathian Mountains in northern Romania.
- July 27 – Following a court order, Israeli police demolish the Bedouin village of Al-Araqeeb north of Beer Sheva, evicting 200 residents.
- August 3 – Lebanon border clash – An IDF officer is killed and another seriously wounded when they come under fire from Lebanese Armed Forces, while on a brush-clearing operation on Israel's side of the border with Lebanon, near kibbutz Misgav Am and the Lebanese village of Adaisseh. The IDF returns fire resulting in the death of two Lebanese soldiers and a Lebanese journalist. Several Lebanese soldiers and another journalist are reportedly wounded.
- August 6 – The Israeli Channel 2 reveals the Galant document, a document which allegedly is a purported PR plan designed to ensure that Yoav Galant would become the next chief of staff. Eventually a police investigation finds evidence that the document was forged and the appointment process of the Chief of General Staff is renewed.
- August 19 – Israeli mathematician, Elon Lindenstrauss, is awarded the 2010 Fields Medal, becoming the first Israeli recipient of this award.
- October 10 – The Israeli cabinet approves a loyalty oath bill requiring all future non-Jews applying for an Israeli citizenship to swear loyalty to Israel as a Jewish and democratic state.
- November 10 – An Israeli Air Force F-16I crashes in Makhtesh Ramon while on a training over the Negev desert in southern Israel, killing both the pilot and navigator of the plane.
- November 14 – The Israeli cabinet approves a plan to allow a further 8,000 Falasha Mura, descendants of Ethiopians Jews who converted to Christianity, into the country.
- November 30 – After about four years of construction, the Carmel Tunnels were inaugurated and opened to traffic, cutting the current travel time from the Haifa South interchange in the west to the Checkpost interchange in the east from 40 minutes down to 8 minutes.
- December 2 – The 2010 Mount Carmel forest fire engulfs a bus carrying cadets from the Israel Prison Service's officer course en route to evacuate prisoners from the Damun Prison in the area of the fire, taking 44 lives, including 37 of the cadets and their officers. "The fire devastates hundreds of acres of pine forest on Mount Carmel in northern Israel, close to the city of Haifa, and is eventually brought under control late on December 5, 2010.
- December 30 – Israel's former President Moshe Katsav is convicted of two counts of rape, obstruction of justice and other sexual offences by a court in Tel Aviv.
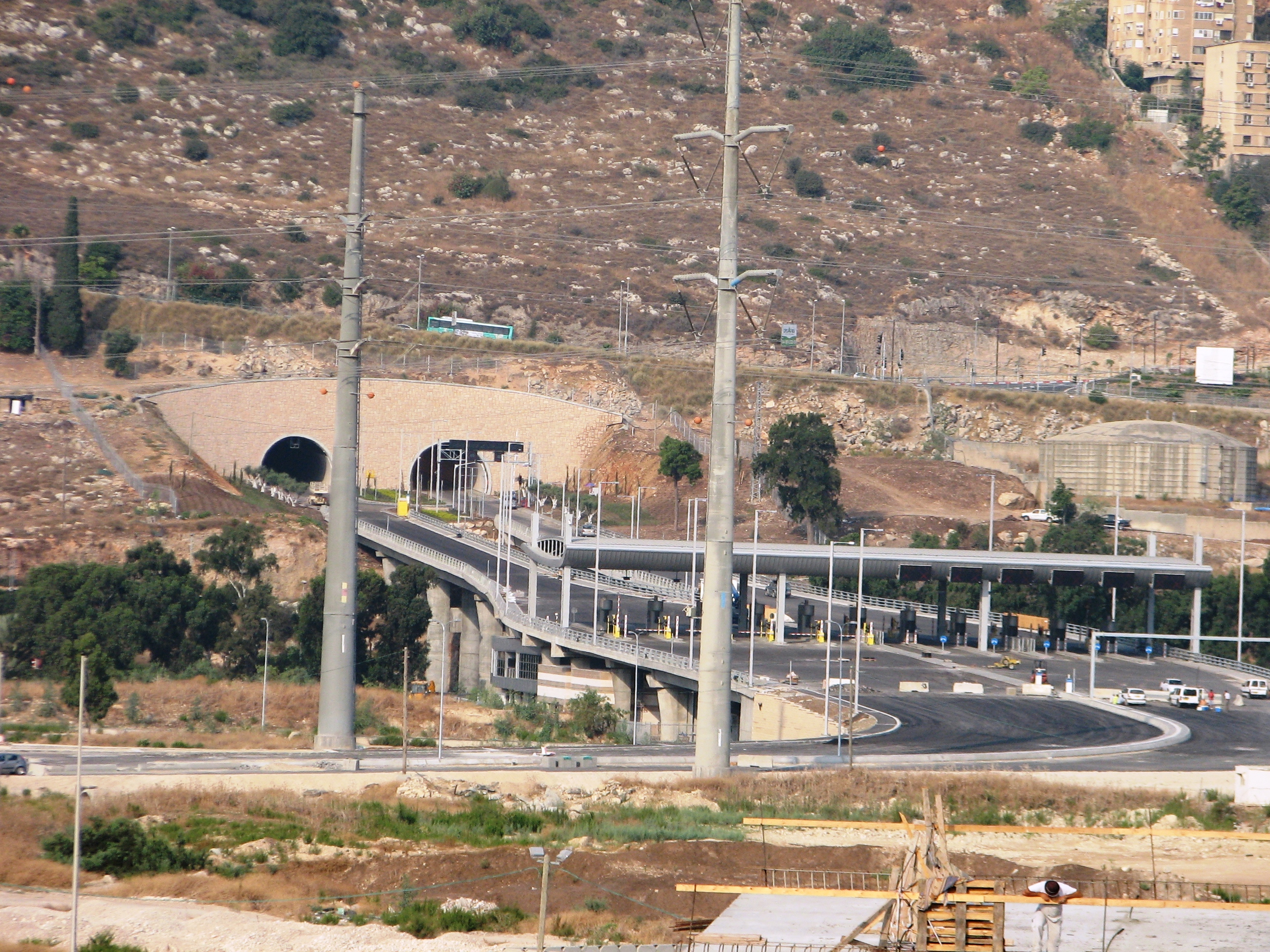
On November 30 the Carmel Tunnels were inaugurated and opened to traffic

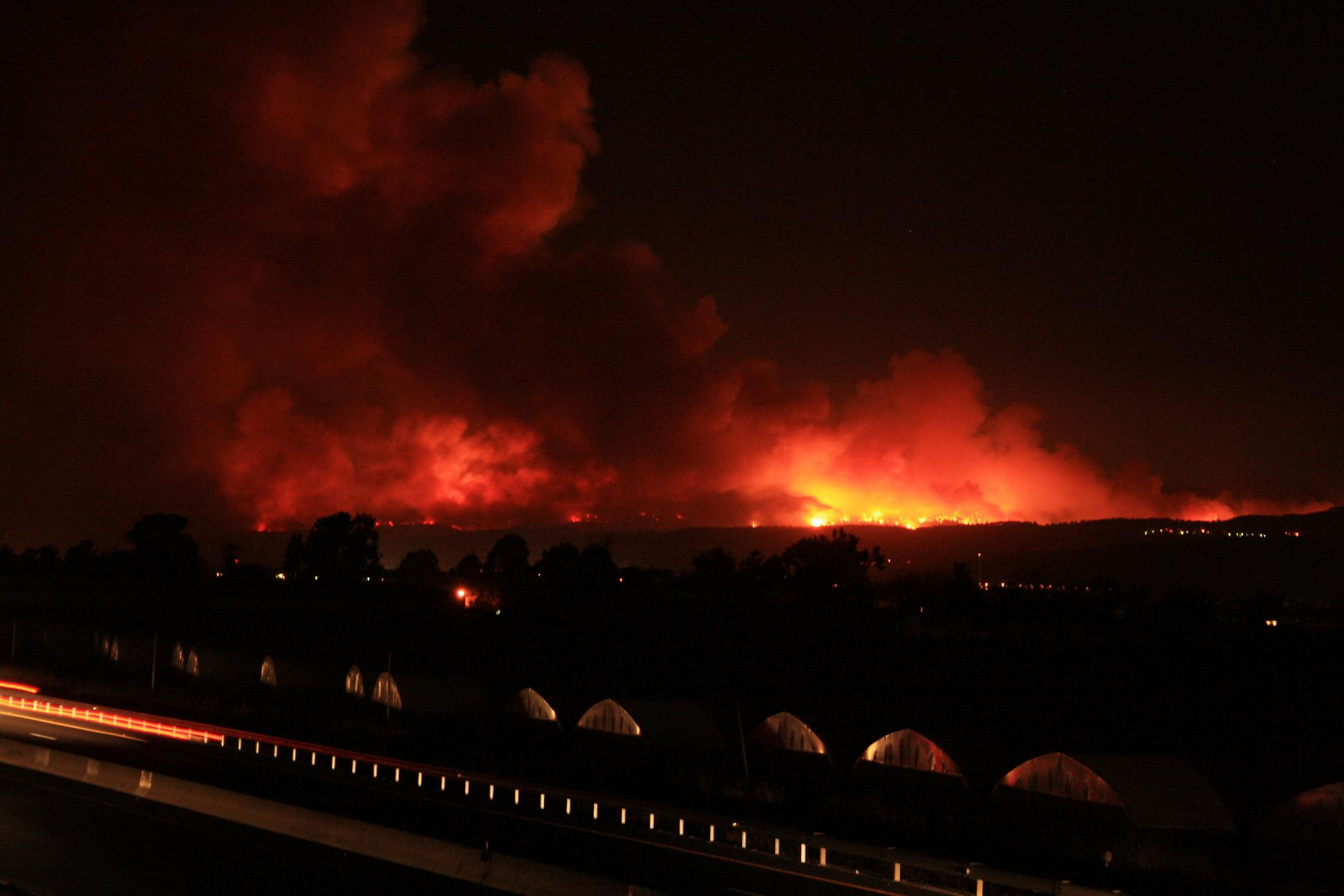
2010 Mount Carmel forest fire – the largest forest fire in Israel's history, December 2010

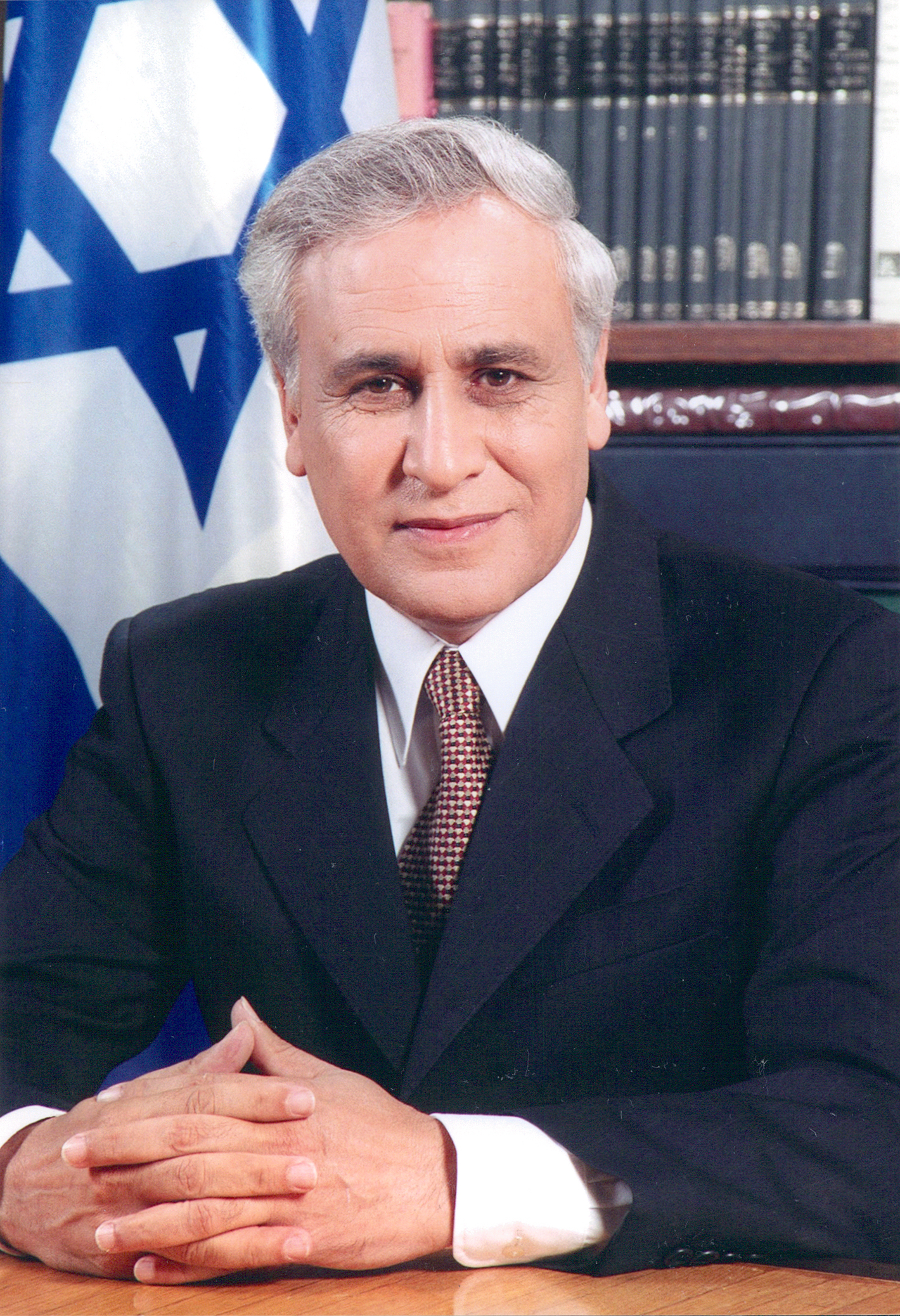
On December 30 Israel's former President Moshe Katsav was convicted of two counts of rape, obstruction of justice and other sexual offences by a court in Tel Aviv

=== Israeli–Palestinian conflict ===
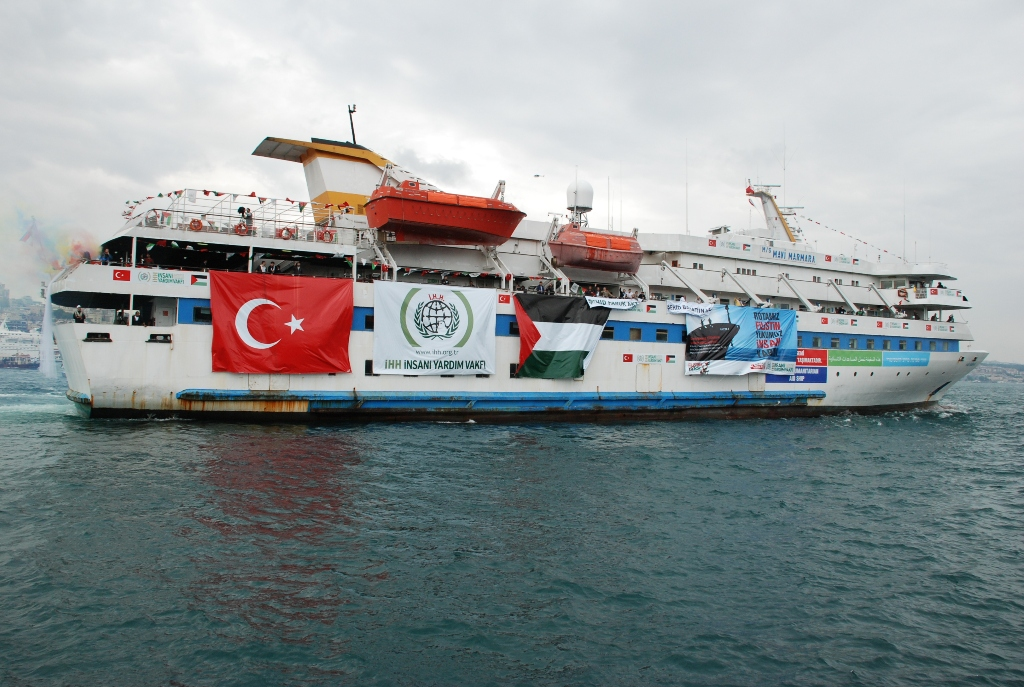
2010 Gaza flotilla raid – photo of the MV Mavi Marmara on which the violent clash erupted.

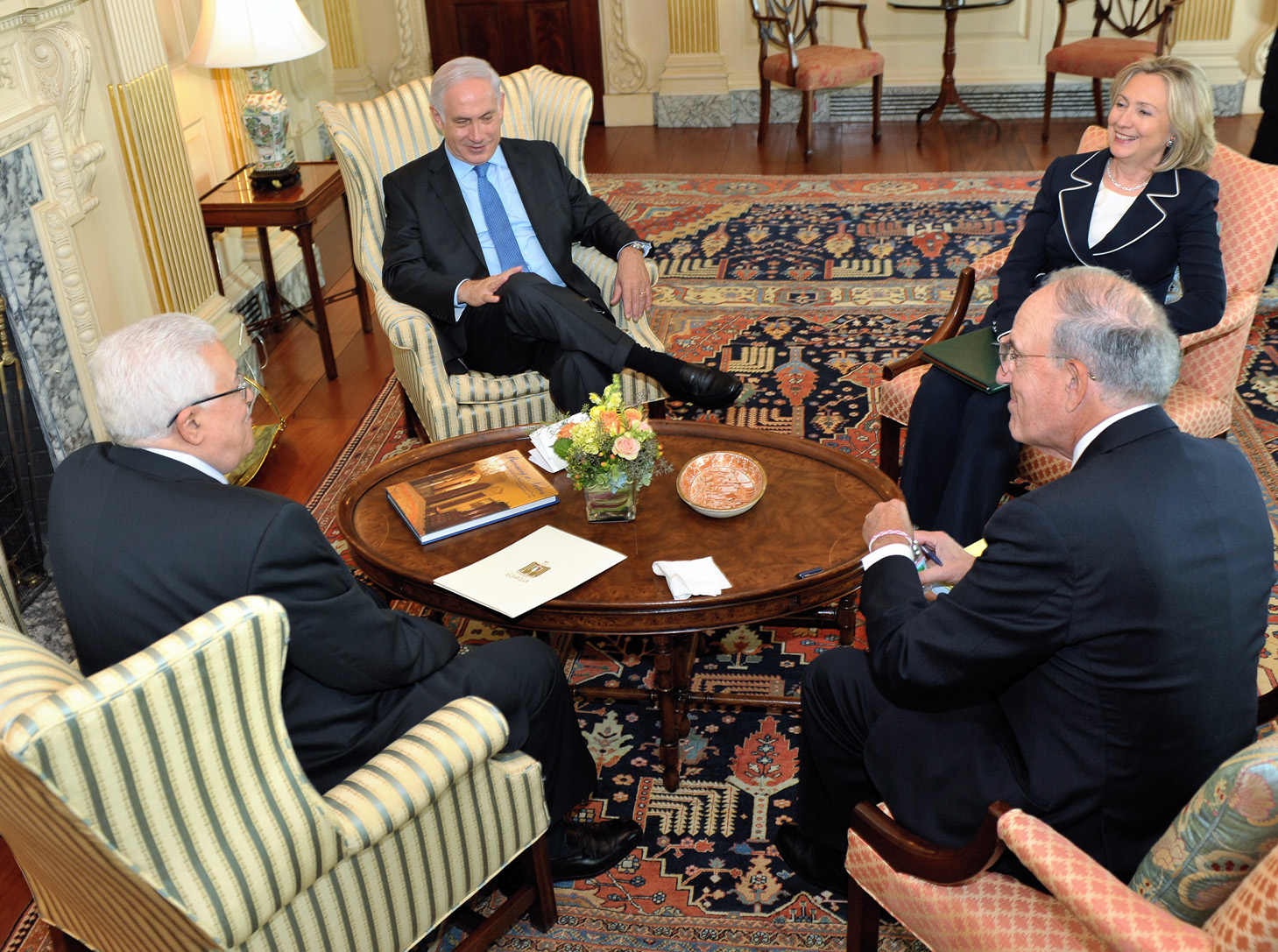
Benjamin Netanyahu, Mahmoud Abbas, George J. Mitchell and Hillary Clinton at the start of direct talks on September 2, 2010.

The most prominent events related to the Israeli–Palestinian conflict which occurred during 2010 include:

- March 10 – Israel's government approves construction of an additional 1,600 apartments in a large Jewish housing development in northeastern Jerusalem called Ramat Shlomo. The Israeli government's announcement occurs during a visit by U.S. vice-president Joe Biden and the U.S. government subsequently issues a strongly worded condemnation of the plan.
- May 31 – Israeli naval forces raid and capture a flotilla of ships, organized by the Free Gaza Movement and the Turkish Foundation for Human Rights and Freedoms and Humanitarian Relief (IHH), which are attempting to break the Israeli and Egyptian blockade of Gaza. During the takeover, a violent confrontation erupts on board the largest ship of the flotilla. As a result, nine activists are killed and several dozen passengers and seven IDF soldiers are wounded.
- June 14 – The Israeli government announces the formation of the Turkel Commission of Inquiry to investigate the Gaza flotilla raid and the blockade of Gaza.
- September 2 – 2010 direct talks: U.S. launches direct negotiations between Israel and The Palestinian Authority in Washington D.C.
- September 14 – 2010 direct talks: A second round of Middle East peace talks between Israel and the Palestinian Authority concludes in Sharm el-Sheikh, Egypt.
- September 26 – The Israeli 10-month moratorium in construction of new settlement homes in the West Bank expires at 22.00 (GMT).
- September 28 – The Israeli Navy intercepts the ship Irene, heading from Cyprus towards Gaza and carrying nine Jewish activists from the US, the UK, Germany and Israel, which was attempting to break the Israeli naval blockade of Gaza.

Notable Palestinian militant operations against Israeli targets

The most prominent Palestinian militant acts and operations committed against Israeli targets during 2010 include:

- February 1 – The Popular Resistance Committees (PRC), a Palestinian militant group in the Gaza Strip with close ties to Hamas, tries to carry out an attack on Israel by means of bombs placed in barrels and sent into the Mediterranean Sea from the Gaza coast.
- February 24 – Murder of Neta Sorek
- March 26 – A team of IDF soldiers from Golani Brigade, who cross the border into the Gaza Strip pursuing several people are seen placing explosive devices near the Israeli border fence, is ambushed and attacked with mortar shells and gunfire from inside the Strip. Two IDF soldiers are killed and three are injured. Hamas and Islamic Jihad claim responsibility for the attack.
- June 11 – A Palestinian militant attempts to run over two Israeli border policemen in the Jerusalem neighbourhood of Wadi al-Joz, close to the Old City Walls. Other members of the border police force, who are at the scene, shoot and critically wound the driver as he tries to escape. The two policemen are lightly injured and receive medical treatment on the spot.
- June 14 – One Israeli policeman is killed and three policemen are injured when Palestinian militants open fire on their vehicle on Highway 60, south of Hebron.
- August 31 – 2010 Palestinian militancy campaign: August 2010 West Bank shooting – Four Israelis, including a pregnant woman, are killed by Palestinian militants in a shooting in the West Bank next to Kiryat Arba, when a gunman opens fire on their car. Hamas claim responsibility for the attack.
- September 1 – 2010 Palestinian militancy campaign: Rimonim junction shooting: Palestinian militants open fire on an Israeli car near Kochav HaShachar in the West Bank moderately injuring an Israeli man and lightly injuring an Israeli woman. Hamas has claimed responsibility for the attack.
- September 26 – 2010 Palestinian militancy campaign: Palestinian gunmen open fire on a pregnant woman and her husband in their car, wounding them both in the legs. The gunmen also shoot at another car, whose occupants evade injury. Fatah and Palestinian Islamic Jihad claim responsibility for the attack.
- December 18 – Murder of Kristine Luken: An American Christian missionary, Kristine Luken, is murdered and her British-born Israeli friend is seriously wounded by two knife-wielding Palestinian militants while hiking in a forest near Beit Shemesh, on the outskirts of Jerusalem. Four Palestinians, members of a Palestinian terror cell, are later indicted for the attack, which was described as nationalist orientated.

Notable Israeli military operations against Palestinian militancy targets
The most prominent Israeli counter-terrorist operations (military campaigns and military operations) carried out against Palestinian militants during 2010 include:

- March 26–27 – March 2010 Israel–Gaza clashes between Israel and Palestinian groups
- May 26 – Israel launches two night-time air strikes on the Gaza Strip in response to mortar attacks and the detonation of 200 kg of explosives laden on a donkey-cart next to the border fence.
- July 21 – Two militants of the Islamic Jihad Movement in Palestine are killed and another six wounded by Israeli shelling as they approached the Gaza Strip-Israel border near Beit Hanoun. A ten-year-old girl is also wounded.
- September 5 – Israeli F-16 warplanes launch airstrikes on Gaza smuggling tunnels, with one Palestinian dead and several injured, in retaliation for recent attacks from the Gaza Strip.
- September 12 – IDF soldiers identify a group of armed men approaching Israel from Gaza near Kibbutz Erez, killing three; Palestinian sources claim that two were farmers.
- September 14 – One Palestinian gunman is killed and four more are wounded in a Gaza firefight after launching RPGs and missiles at IDF soldiers.
- September 28 – Three al-Quds Brigades militants are killed by an Israeli airstrike. The IDF claims they were preparing to fire into Israel.

== Notable deaths ==
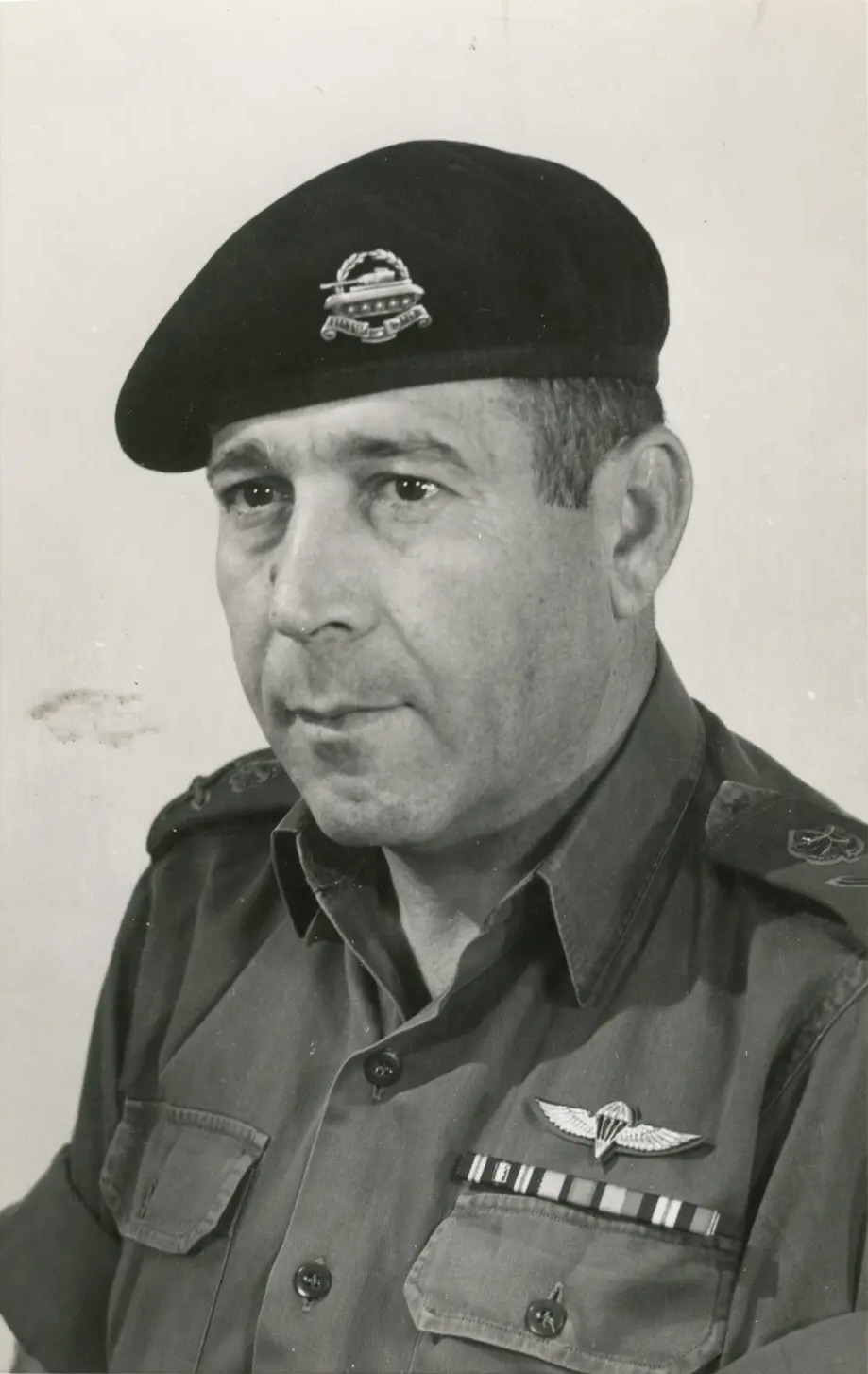
Israel Tal

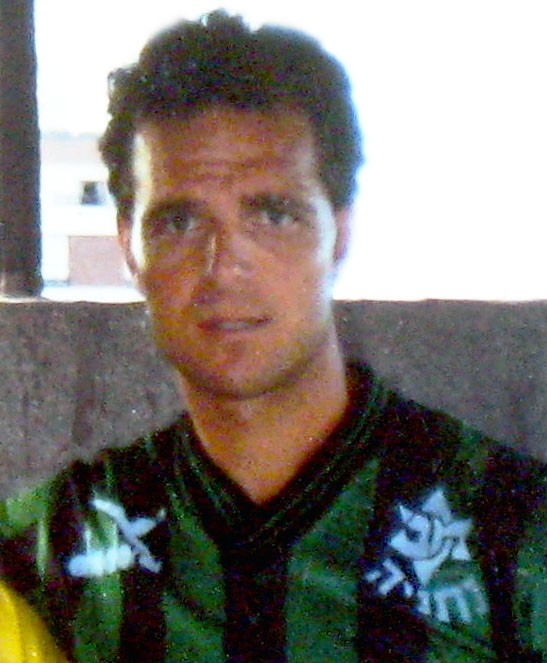
Avi Cohen

- January 9 – Bruria Kaufman (born 1918), American-born Israeli physicist.
- January 9 – Nadav Levitan (born 1945), Israeli film director and screenwriter – lung disease.
- January 20 – Abraham Sutzkever (born 1913), Polish-born Israeli poet
- February 3 – Elazar ben Tsedaka ben Yitzhaq (born 1927), Samaritan High Priest.
- February 4 – Meir Pichhadze (born 1955), Soviet (Georgian)-born Israeli artist and painter – cancer.
- February 10 – Yosef Azran (born 1941), Moroccan-born Israeli rabbi and politician, member of Knesset (1988–1996) – liver failure.
- February 21 – Menachem Porush (born 1916), Israeli politician, member of Knesset (1959–1975, 1977–1994).
- February 28 – David Bankier (born 1947), German-born Israeli Holocaust scholar.
- March 8 – David Kimche (born 1928), British-born Israeli diplomat, Mossad agent (1953–1980) – brain cancer.
- March 26 – Shmuel Katz (born 1926), Austrian-born Israeli caricaturist and illustrator.
- April 29 – Avigdor Arikha (born 1929), Romanian-born Israeli painter – complications of cancer.
- May 14 – David Maimon (born 1929), Israeli general, head of the Israel Prison Service.
- May 30 – Arie Eliav (born 1921), Russian-born Israeli politician – after long illness.
- June 7 – Mordechai Eliyahu (born 1929), Israeli rabbi, Sephardi Chief Rabbi of Israel (1983–1993).
- July 9 – Yehuda Amital (born 1924), Romanian-born Israeli rabbi and politician.
- July 27 – Tzvi Kamil (born 1935), Polish-born Israeli scientist and inventor.
- September 2 – Shmuel Eisenstadt (born 1923), Polish-born Israeli sociologist.
- September 8 – Israel Tal (born 1924), Israeli general known for leading the development of Israel's Merkava tank.
- September 21 – Shabtai Rosenne (born 1917), British-born Israeli diplomat and professor of international law – cardiac arrest.
- September 28 – Israel Dostrovsky (born 1918), Russian (Ukraine)-born Israeli scientist, fifth president of the Weizmann Institute of Science.
- October 27 – Ehud Netzer (born 1934), Israeli archaeologist – injuries from a fall.
- October 29 – Yisrael Katz (born 1927), Austrian-born Israeli politician and former minister.
- November 2 – Sarah Doron (born 1922), Lithuanian-born Israeli politician and government minister.
- November 9 – Amos Lavi (born 1953), Libyan-born Israeli actor.
- December 9 – Dov Shilansky (born 1924), Lithuanian-born Israeli politician, Speaker of the Knesset.
- December 18 – Max Jammer (born 1915), German-born Israeli physicist.
- December 28 – Avi Cohen (born 1956), Egyptian-born Israeli footballer – motorcycle accident.

== Major public holidays ==
- Tu Bishvat – sunset, January 29 to nightfall, January 30
- Fast of Esther – February 25 (dawn to nightfall)
- Purim – nightfall, February 27 to nightfall, February 28
- Shushan Purim, Jerusalem – nightfall, February 28 to nightfall, March 1
- Fast of the Firstborn – March 29 (dawn to sunset)
- Passover and Chol HaMoed Pesach – sunset March 29 to nightfall, April 5 (7th day) (an additional day is observed outside Israel)
- Holocaust Remembrance Day – nightfall, April 11 to nightfall, April 12
- Fallen Soldiers Remembrance Day – nightfall, April 18 to nightfall April 19
- Israel's Independence Day – nightfall, April 19 to nightfall, April 20
- Lag Ba'omer – nightfall May 1 to nightfall, May 2
- Jerusalem Day – nightfall May 11 to nightfall, May 12
- Shavuot – sunset, May 18 to nightfall, May 19 (a second day is observed outside Israel)
- Seventeenth of Tammuz fast – June 29 (dawn to nightfall)
- Ninth of Av fast – sunset, July 19 to nightfall, July 20
- Rosh Hashanah – sunset, September 8 to sunset, September 10
- Fast of Gedalia – September 12 (dawn to nightfall)
- Yom Kippur – sunset, September 17 to nightfall, September 18
- Sukkot and Chol HaMoed Sukkot – sunset, September 22 to sunset, September 29
- Simchat Torah/Shemini Atzeret – sunset, September 29 to nightfall of September 30 (a second day is observed outside Israel)
- Hanukkah – sunset, December 1 to sunset, December 9
- Tenth of Tevet fast – December 17 (dawn to nightfall)

== See also ==
- 2010 in Israeli film
- Israel in the Eurovision Song Contest 2010
- Israel at the 2010 Winter Olympics
- Israel at the 2010 Summer Youth Olympics
- Israel at the 2010 European Championships in Athletics
- 2010 in the Palestinian territories
