= Arab–Israeli conflict =

Geopolitical conflict in the Middle East

- Part of the Cold War and Middle Eastern conflicts
- The main parties in the Arab–Israeli conflict Israel West Bank and Gaza Strip Syria Iraq Egypt Jordan Lebanon
Date	1948–present (main phase: 15 May 1948 – 26 March 1979)
Location	Middle East
Status	Ongoing; partial normalization and alliance: Egypt–Israel peace treaty (1979); Israel–Lebanon peace treaty attempt (1983); Oslo I Accord (1993); Israel–Jordan peace treaty (1994); Oslo II Accord (1995); Abraham Accords (2020); Middle Eastern crisis (2023–present)
Territorial changes	1948: Establishment of the State of Israel; Jordan occupies the West Bank; Egypt occupies the Gaza Strip; Establishment of the All-Palestine Protectorate (dissolved in 1959); 1956: Israel occupies the Gaza Strip and the Sinai Peninsula from Egypt; 1957: Israel returns the Gaza Strip and the Sinai Peninsula to Egypt; 1967: Israel occupies the Gaza Strip from Egypt; Israel occupies the Sinai Peninsula from Egypt; Israel occupies the West Bank from Jordan; Israel occupies the Golan Heights from Syria; 1974: A buffer zone established in the Golan Heights between Israel and Syria; 1982: Israel fully returns the Sinai Peninsula to Egypt (Taba, Egypt returned in 1989); Israel occupies southern Lebanon; 1988: Establishment of the State of Palestine; 1995: Division of the West Bank; Palestinian governance in Area A and Area B; Israeli governance in Area C; 2000: Israel withdraws from southern Lebanon; 2005: Israel disengages from the Gaza Strip; 2019: End of Israel's 25-year lease of Al Ghamr from Jordan; 2024: Israel re-occupies the buffer zone in the Golan Heights between Israel and Syria

Belligerents
Israel; Mahal volunteers (1948); United Kingdom (1956); France (1956); Free Lebanon (1978–1984); South Lebanon Army (1984–2000)	Arab League (1948–1979); Egypt (1948–1979); Jordan (1948–1994); Lebanon (1948–present); Hezbollah (1985–present); Iraq (1948–present); Syria (1948–present); Saudi Arabia (1948–1949); Yemen (1948–1949); All-Palestine (1948–1959); AHW (1947–1949); Fedayeen (1949–1964); PLO (1964–present); Palestinian Authority (1994–present); Hamas (1988–present); 1973 Reinforcements: Saudi Arabia; Algeria; Libya; Kuwait; Tunisia; Morocco

Commanders and leaders
(Israel) David Ben-Gurion (1948–1963); (Israel) Yigael Yadin (1948–1952); (Israel) Yaakov Dori (1948–1949); (Israel) Yitzhak Rabin X (1948–1995); (Israel) Ariel Sharon (1948–2005); (Israel) Ehud Barak (1959–2013); (Israel) Benjamin Netanyahu (1996–present); (Israel) Moshe Dayan (1948–1979); Saad Haddad (1978–1984); Antoine Lahad (1984–2000)	(Egypt) Farouk I (1948–1965); (Egypt) Mohamed Naguib (1948–1984); (Egypt) Gamal Abdel Nasser (1948–1970); (Egypt) Anwar Sadat (1948–1978); (Egypt) Ahmed Ali al-Mwawi (1948–1979); (Egypt) Saad el-Shazly (1948–2011); (Jordan) Abdullah I (1948–1951); (Jordan) John Bagot Glubb (1948–1956); (Jordan) Hussein (1953–1994); (Jordan) Habis Majali (1948–2001); (Ba'athist Syria) Hafez al-Assad (1948–2000); Amin al-Husseini (1948–1974); Abdul Qadir al-Husayni †; Hasan Salama †; Fawzi al-Qawuqji (1948–1977)

Casualties and losses
- See § Casualties for details.

Since the declaration of Israel's establishment in 1948, conflict has existed between Israel and the surrounding Arab countries, rooted in the Israeli–Palestinian conflict. Zionists viewed the region of Palestine as the Jewish ancestral homeland and sought to establish a Jewish state or homeland there through colonization, while Arabs generally opposed Zionism, envisioning Palestine as Arab Palestinian land and an essential part of the Arab world.

By 1920, sectarian conflict had begun following the first, second, and third waves of Zionist migration to Palestine and the Franco-British occupation and administration (1918–1920) of the former territories of Ottoman Syria (1516–1918) and the dissolution of the Ottoman Empire after World War I. In 1920, following agreements including the 1916 Sykes–Picot treaty between Britain and France, the McMahon–Hussein correspondence, and the Balfour Declaration, which expressed British support for "the establishment in Palestine of a national home for the Jewish people", the League of Nations accorded the Mandate for Palestine to the British, establishing British rule in Mandatory Palestine (1920–1948).

The intercommunal violence escalated into civil war in 1947 after the United Nations' adoption of the Partition Plan for Palestine, and then into an international war in 1948 with the May 14 declaration of the establishment of Israel, the expiration of British Mandate at midnight, and the entry of Arab regular armies the following morning. The 1948 Palestine war ended with the 1949 Armistice Agreements, which established the Green Line. More wars followed in 1956, 1967, 1973, and 1982.

Several peace treaties and other diplomatic and economic accords were signed over the subsequent half-century. In 2002, the Arab League proposed the Arab Peace Initiative, although diplomatic activity between Israel and individual Arab countries involved ceasefires and later formal relations with some. By 2020, the Abraham Accords further calmed relations. Conflicts between Israel and various Palestinian factions ebbed and flowed, including the 1987–1993 First Intifada, Israel's intervention in the 1975–1990 Lebanese Civil War to oust the Palestine Liberation Organization from Lebanon, the 2000–2005 Second Intifada, the 2011–2024 Syrian civil war, and most recently the October 7 attacks in 2023 and ensuing Gaza war.

== Background ==
=== National movements ===
Medieval antisemitism in Arabic-speaking lands was rarer than in Europe, but Jews remained subject to persecution. The rise of Zionism and Arab nationalism in the late 19th century is believed by some scholars to have caused a rise in Arab antisemitism. The roots of the Arab–Israeli conflict lie in the tensions between Zionism and Palestinian nationalism. Territory regarded by the Jewish people as their historical homeland is considered by many Arabs as belonging to Palestinians. The area was under the control of the Ottoman Empire for nearly 400 years until its partitioning in the aftermath of the Great Arab Revolt during World War I. Approaching the end of their empire, the Ottomans began to assert the primacy of Turks within the empire, while discriminating against Arabs. The promise of liberation led many Jews and Arabs to support the allied powers during World War I, forging widespread Arab nationalism. Arab nationalism and Zionism began in Europe. The Zionist Congress started in Basel in 1897, while the Arab Club emerged in Paris in 1906.

In the late 19th century Jewish communities began to migrate to Palestine, purchasing land from Ottoman landlords. The late 19th century population in Palestine reached 600,000 – mostly Muslim Arabs, with significant minorities of Jews, Christians, Druze and some Samaritan and Baháʼí. At that time, Jerusalem did not extend beyond the walled area and had a population of a few tens of thousands. Collective farms, known as kibbutzim, were established, as was the first entirely Jewish city in modern times, Tel Aviv.

During 1915–1916, as World War I was underway, the British High Commissioner in Egypt, Sir Henry McMahon, secretly corresponded with Husayn ibn 'Ali, the patriarch of the Hashemite family and Ottoman governor of Mecca and Medina. McMahon convinced Husayn to lead an Arab revolt against the Ottomans, which had aligned with Germany against Britain and France. McMahon promised that if the Arabs supported Britain in the war, the British government would support an independent Arab state under Hashemite rule in the Arab provinces of the Ottoman Empire, including Palestine. The Arab revolt, led by T. E. Lawrence ("Lawrence of Arabia") and Husayn's son Faysal, was successful in defeating the Ottomans, and Britain took control over much of this area.

=== Sectarian conflict ===
==== First mandate years and the Franco-Syrian war ====
In 1917, British‑led troops (including the Jewish Legion) captured Palestine from the Ottoman Empire; the British government issued the Balfour Declaration, which stated that the government viewed favorably "the establishment in Palestine of a national home for the Jewish people" but "that nothing shall be done which may prejudice the civil and religious rights of existing non-Jewish communities in Palestine". The Declaration was a result of the belief of key members of the government, including Prime Minister David Lloyd George, that Jewish support was essential to winning the war; however, the declaration upset the Arab world. After the war, the area came under British rule as the British Mandate of Palestine. The area mandated to the British in 1923 included what modern Israel, the West Bank, and Gaza Strip. Transjordan eventually was carved into a separate British protectorate – the Emirate of Transjordan, which gained autonomous status in 1928 and achieved independence in 1946 with United Nations approved end of the British Mandate.

A major crisis among Arab nationalists took place with the failed establishment of the Arab Kingdom of Syria in 1920. With the disastrous outcome of the Franco-Syrian War, the self-proclaimed Hashemite kingdom with its capital in Damascus was defeated and the Hashemite ruler took refuge in Mandatory Iraq. The crisis saw the first confrontation Arab and Jewish forces in the Battle of Tel Hai in March 1920. More importantly the collapse of the pan-Arabist kingdom led to the establishment of the Palestinian flavor of Arab nationalism, with the return of Amin al-Husseini from Damascus to Jerusalem in late 1920.

Jewish immigration to Mandatory Palestine continued, accompanied by a similar, but less documented, migration in the Arab sector, returning workers from Syria and other areas. Palestinians considered this rapid influx of Jewish immigrants to threaten their homeland and their identity. Jewish policies of purchasing land and prohibiting the Arab employment in Jewish-owned industries and farms enraged Palestinian communities. Demonstrations were held as early as 1920, protesting what the Arabs felt were unfair preferences for Jewish immigrants in the British mandate. Violence broke out later that year in Jerusalem. Winston Churchill's 1922 White Paper tried to reassure the Arab population, denying that the creation of a Jewish state was the implication of the Balfour Declaration.

==== 1929 ====
In 1929, after a demonstration by Vladimir Jabotinsky's political group Betar at the Western Wall, riots started in Jerusalem and expanded throughout Mandatory Palestine; Arabs murdered 67 Jews in Hebron, in what became known as the Hebron massacre. During the week of the 1929 riots, at least 116 Arabs and 133 Jews were killed and 339 were wounded.

==== 1930s and 1940s ====
By 1931, 17 percent of the population of Mandatory Palestine were Jewish, an increase of six percent since 1922. Jewish immigration peaked soon after the Nazis came to power in Germany, doubling the Jewish population in Palestine.

In the mid-1930s Izz ad-Din al-Qassam arrived from Syria and established the Black Hand, an anti-Zionist and anti-British militant organization. He recruited and arranged military training for peasants, and by 1935 he had enlisted between 200 and 800 men. The cells were equipped with bombs and firearms, which they used to kill Jewish settlers in the area, as well as engaging in a campaign of vandalism of Jewish settler plantations. By 1936, escalating tensions led to the 1936–1939 Arab revolt in Palestine.

In response to Arab pressure, the British Mandate authorities greatly reduced the number of Jewish immigrants to Palestine (see White Paper of 1939 and the SS Exodus). These restrictions remained in place until the end of the mandate, which coincided with the Nazi Holocaust and the flight of Jewish refugees from Europe. As a consequence, most Jewish entrants to Mandatory Palestine were considered illegal (see Aliyah Bet), intensifying tensions. Following several failed diplomatic attempts to solve the problem, the British asked the United Nations for help. On 15 May 1947, the General Assembly appointed a committee, the UNSCOP, composed of representatives from eleven states. The US, the USSR and other major powers were not represented. After five weeks of in-country study, the Committee offered a majority and a minority plan. The majority proposed a Plan of Partition with Economic Union. The minority proposed The Independent State of Palestine. With only slight modifications, the former was adopted in resolution 181(II) of 29 November 1947. The Resolution was adopted by 33 votes to 13 with 10 abstentions. All six UN-member Arab states voted no. On the ground, Arab and Jewish Palestinians fought to control strategic positions in the region. Major atrocities were committed by both sides.

=== Civil war ===
Boundaries defined in the 1947 UN Partition Plan for Palestine: Area assigned for a Jewish state Area assigned for an Arab state Planned Corpus separatum with the intention that Jerusalem would be neither Jewish nor Arab Armistice Demarcation Lines of 1949 (Green Line): Israel per 1949 armistice lines West Jerusalem and other areas under Israeli control from 1949 Gaza and the West Bank (including East Jerusalem) under Egyptian and Jordanian control till 1967

Just before the end of the mandate, the Haganah launched offensives in which they gained control over all the territory allocated by the UN to the Jewish State, creating a flood of refugees and capturing the towns of Tiberias, Haifa, Safad, Beisan and, in effect, Jaffa.

Early in 1948 the United Kingdom announced its firm intention to terminate its mandate in Palestine on 14 May. In response, US president Truman made a statement on 25 March proposing UN trusteeship rather than partition, stating that:

unfortunately, it has become clear that the partition plan cannot be carried out at this time by peaceful means. [...] unless emergency action is taken, there will be no public authority in Palestine on that date capable of preserving law and order. Violence and bloodshed will descend upon the Holy Land. Large-scale fighting among the people of that country will be the inevitable result.

== History ==
=== 1948 Arab–Israeli War ===
On 14 May 1948, the day on which the British Mandate expired, the Jewish People's Council gathered at the Tel Aviv Museum and approved a proclamation that declared the establishment of a Jewish state in Eretz Israel, to be known as the State of Israel.

The borders of the new state were not delineated. An official cablegram from the Secretary-General of the League of Arab States to the UN Secretary-General on 15 May 1948 stated publicly that Arab Governments found "themselves compelled to intervene for the sole purpose of restoring peace and security and establishing law and order in Palestine" in Clause 10(e). Further in Clause 10(e):

The Governments of the Arab States hereby confirm at this stage the view that had been repeatedly declared by them on previous occasions, such as the London Conference and before the United Nations mainly, the only fair and just solution to the problem of Palestine is the creation of United State of Palestine based upon the democratic principles ...

That day, the armies of Egypt, Lebanon, Syria, Jordan and Iraq invaded, launching the 1948 Arab–Israeli War. The nascent Israeli Defense Force repulsed the Arab forces, extending the nascent state's borders beyond the original UNSCOP partition. By December 1948, Israel controlled most of Mandate Palestine west of the Jordan River. The remainder of the Mandate consisted of what became the nation of Jordan, the area that came to be called the West Bank (controlled by Jordan), and the Gaza Strip (controlled by Egypt). Before and during this conflict, 713,000 Palestinian Arabs were expelled or fled, becoming Palestinian refugees.

During the war, Israel conducted a biological warfare campaign codenamed Cast Thy Bread to covertly poison Palestinian wells to prevent villagers from returning. Many Palestinians fled from the areas taken by Israel as a response to massacres of Arab towns by militant Jewish organizations like the Irgun and the Lehi (See Deir Yassin massacre). The war came to an end with the signing of the 1949 Armistice Agreements between Israel and each of its Arab neighbors.

The status of Jewish citizens in Arab states worsened during the war. Anti-Jewish riots erupted throughout the Arab World in December 1947. Jewish communities were hit particularly hard in Aleppo, Syria and British-controlled Aden, with hundreds of dead and injured. In Libya, Jews were deprived of citizenship, and in Iraq, their property was seized. Egypt expelled most of its foreign community, including Jews, after the Suez crisis in 1956, while Algeria deprived its French citizens, including Jews, of citizenship upon its independence in 1962. Over the course of twenty years, some 850,000 Jews from Arab countries emigrated.

=== 1949–1967 ===
Following Israel's victory in the 1948 Arab–Israeli War, Jews living in the West Bank or Gaza were expelled to Israel. Arabs caught on the Palestinian side of the ceasefire line could not return to their homes in Israel. Those on the Israeli side were not formally expelled, although many fled. Responsibility for the exodus remains disputed. Historian Benny Morris claimed that the "decisive cause" of Palestinian departure was predominantly Jewish forces' actions (physical expulsions, military assaults on residential areas, fear of fighting, abandonment of nearby villages, incitement propaganda), while Arab leadership orders were decisive in only 6 of 392 villages. Over 700,000 Jews emigrated to Israel from 1948 to 1952, including ~285,000 from Arab countries.

In 1956, Egypt closed the Straits of Tiran to Israeli shipping and blockaded the Gulf of Aqaba, contravening the Constantinople Convention of 1888. Israel supporters viewed this as violating the 1949 Armistice Agreements. On 26 July 1956, Egypt nationalized the Suez Canal Company and closed the canal to Israeli shipping. Israel invaded the Sinai Peninsula on 29 October with British and French support. During the Suez Crisis, Israel captured the Gaza Strip and Sinai. The United States and United Nations advocated a ceasefire. Israel then withdrew from Egyptian territory. Egypt allowed regional navigation freedom and Sinai demilitarization. The United Nations Emergency Force (UNEF) deployed to oversee demilitarization. UNEF operated only on the Egyptian side, as Israel refused deployment on its territory.

Israel established a national water carrier in 1964, an engineering project to transfer its Jordan River allocation southward to enable mass Negev settlement. Arabs attempted a Jordan headwaters diversion, escalating the Israel–Syria conflict.

The Palestine Liberation Organization (PLO) formed in 1964 with a charter committing to "[t]he liberation of Palestine [which] will destroy the Zionist and imperialist presence..." (Article 22, 1968).On 19 May 1967, Egypt expelled UNEF observers and deployed 100,000 troops in Sinai. It again closed the Straits of Tiran to Israeli shipping, reverting to 1956 blockade conditions.

Jordan signed a defense pact with Egypt on 30 May 1967. Egypt mobilized Sinai units, crossed UN lines, and massed on Israel's southern border. Israel attacked Egypt on 5 June. The Israeli Air Force destroyed most Egyptian airpower in a surprise strike, then eliminated Jordanian, Syrian, and Iraqi forces, enabling Israel's Six-Day War victory. Israel gained the Sinai Peninsula, Gaza Strip, West Bank (including East Jerusalem), Shebaa farms, and the Golan Heights.

=== 1967–1973 ===
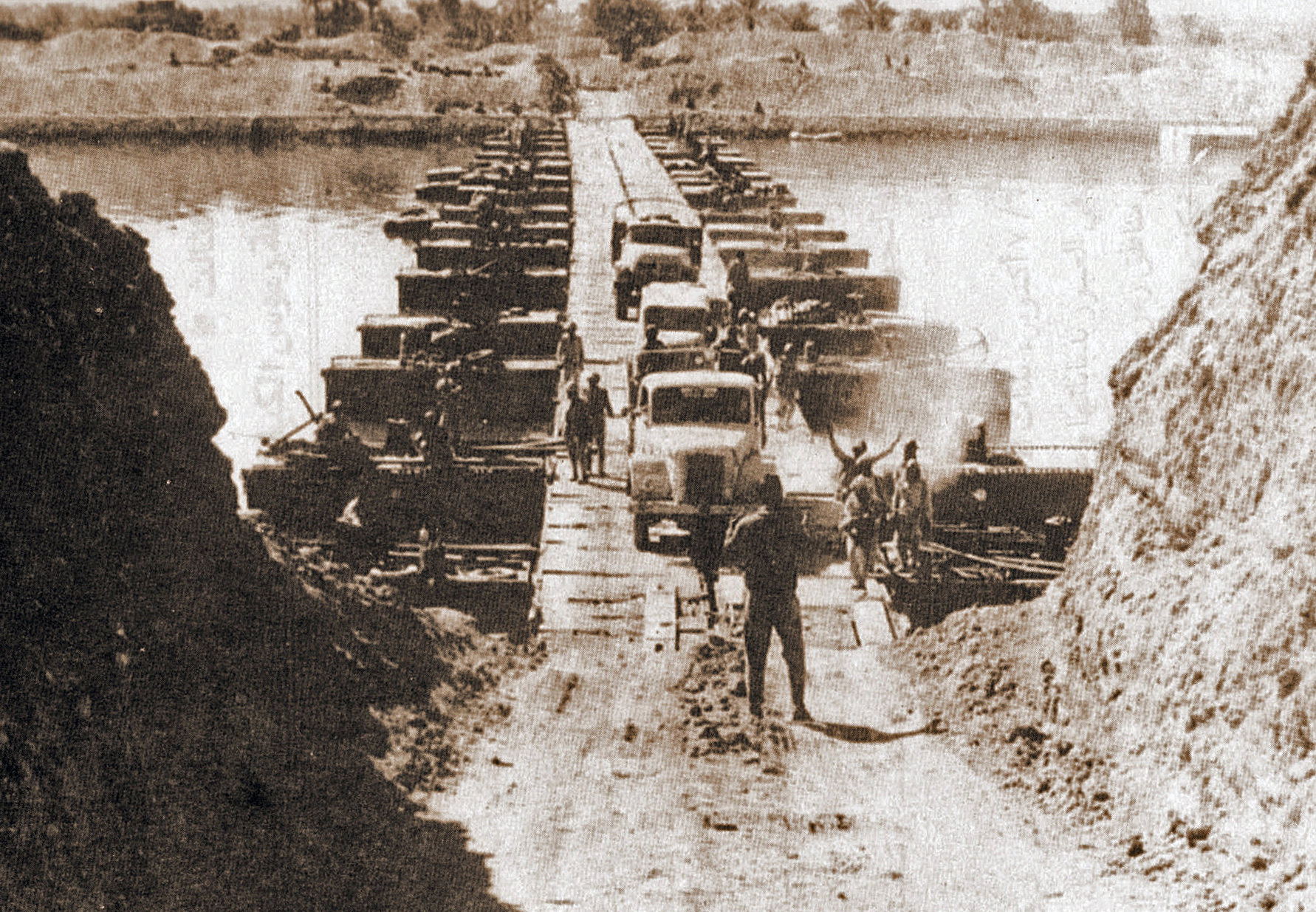
Egyptian forces crossing the Suez Canal on 7 October 1973

Arab leaders met in Khartoum in August 1967 to address the war and Arab policy toward Israel. They agreed on no recognition, no peace, and no negotiations with Israel—the "three no's". Abd al-Azim Ramadan argued this left war as the only option.

Egypt launched the War of Attrition in 1967 to wear down Israel and force Sinai concessions. It ended after Gamal Abdel Nasser's 1970 death. Successor Anwar Sadat expelled 15,000 Soviet advisors to court U.S. help to pressure Israel on territorial return.

On 6 October 1973, Syria and Egypt surprise-attacked Israel on Yom Kippur. Israel needed three days to mobilize fully. Other Arab states reinforced them and imposed an oil embargo on the U.S., Japan, and Western Europe, quadrupling prices. The Yom Kippur War enabled U.S.–Soviet indirect confrontation. As Israel reversed momentum, the USSR threatened intervention. Fearing nuclear escalation, the U.S. brokered a ceasefire on 25 October.

=== 1974–2000 ===
==== Egypt ====
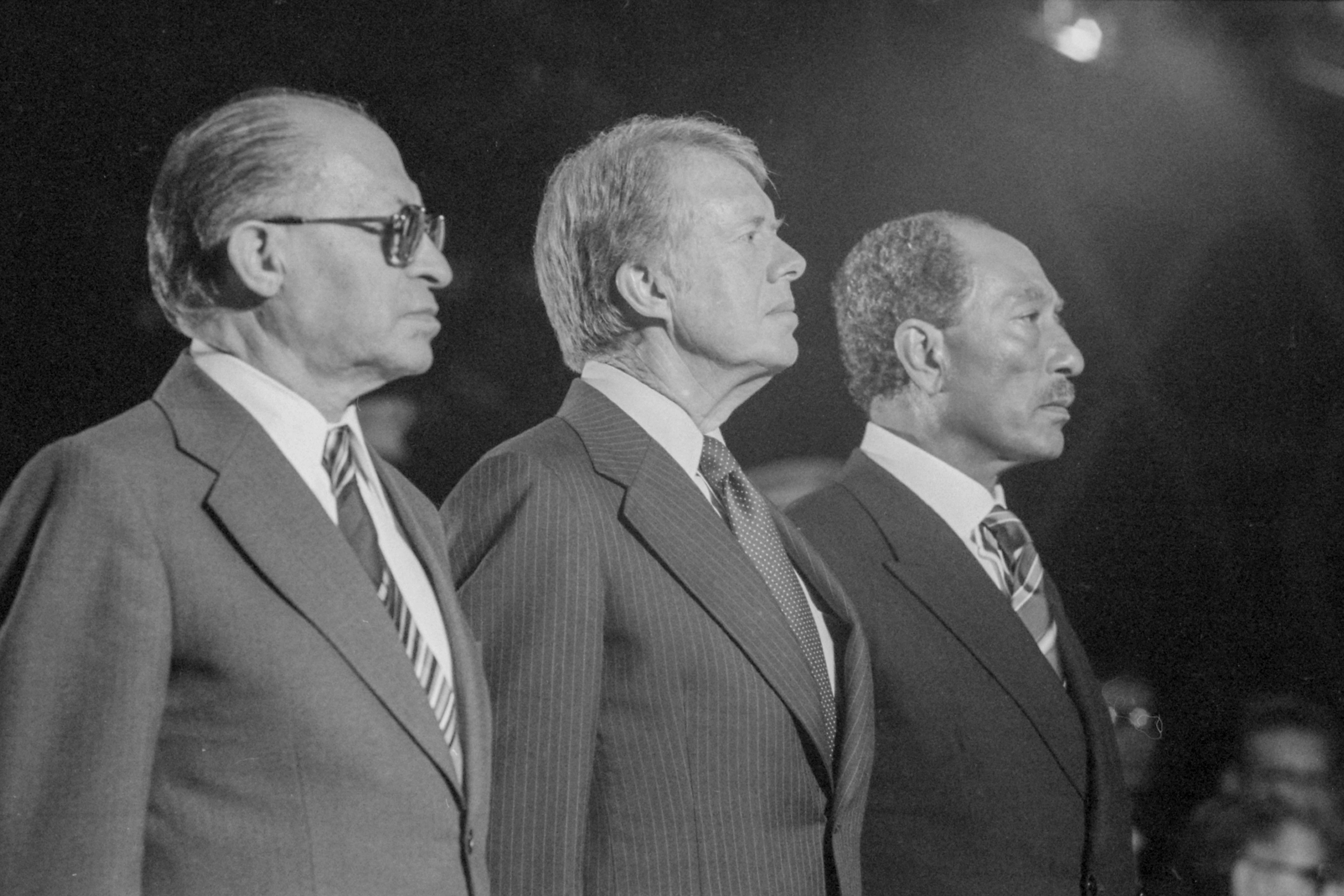
Begin, Carter and Sadat at Camp David on 7 September 1978

Following Camp David Accords in September 1978, Israel and Egypt signed a peace treaty on 26 March 1979. Under its terms, the Sinai Peninsula was returned to Egyptian hands, and the Gaza Strip remained under Israeli control. The agreement also provided for the free passage of Israeli ships through the Suez Canal and recognition of the Straits of Tiran and the Gulf of Aqaba as international waterways. Further terms required Egypt to severely limit the amount of troops and equipment it could deploy in the Sinai.

==== Jordan ====
In October 1994, Israel and Jordan signed a peace agreement, which stipulated mutual cooperation, an end of hostilities, formalizing the Israel-Jordan border, and resolved other issues. Their conflict had cost roughly 18.3 billion dollars. Its signing was closely linked with the efforts to create peace between Israel and the Palestine Liberation Organization (PLO). It was signed at the southern border crossing of Arabah on 26 October 1994.

==== Iraq ====
Israel and Iraq had been foes since 1948. Iraq participated in the 1948 Arab–Israeli War, and later backed Egypt and Syria in the 1967 and 1973 wars.

In June 1981, Israel attacked and destroyed newly built Iraqi nuclear facilities in Operation Opera.

During the 1991 Gulf War, Iraq fired 39 Scud missiles into Israel, in the hopes of uniting the Arab world against the coalition seeking to liberate Kuwait. The United States prevailed upon, Israel to not respond to this attack in order to prevent a wider war.

==== Lebanon ====
In 1970, following an extended civil war, King Hussein expelled the Palestine Liberation Organization from Jordan. September 1970 is known as Black September in Arab history and is sometimes referred to as the "era of regrettable events". The violence resulted in the deaths of tens of thousands of people, the vast majority Palestinians. Armed conflict lasted until July 1971 with the expulsion, when thousands of Palestinian fighters migrated to Lebanon.

The PLO established a de facto autonomous zone from which it staged raids into Israel. PLO helped destabilize Lebanon and trigger the 1975 Lebanese Civil War. In 1978, Israel launched Operation Litani, in which it together with the Free Lebanon Army forced the PLO to retreat north of the Litani river. In 1981 another conflict between Israel and the PLO broke out, which ended with a ceasefire agreement. In June 1982, Israel invaded Lebanon in alliance with Christian factions of the Lebanese government. Within two months the PLO agreed to move across the river.

In March 1983, Israel and Lebanon signed a normalization agreement. However, President Amine Gemayel nullified the truce in March 1984 under pressure from Syria. In 1985, Israeli forces withdrew to a 15 km wide strip along Lebanon's southern border. The conflict continued on a lower scale. In 1993 and 1996, Israel launched major operations against the Hezbollah militia. In May 2000, the new Israeli government of Ehud Barak withdrew from Lebanon, fulfilling an election promise ahead of a deadline. The withdrawal lead to the immediate collapse of the South Lebanon Army, and many members were either arrested or fled to Israel.

==== Palestinians ====
The 1970s were marked by major, international terrorist attacks, including the Lod Airport massacre and the Munich Olympics Massacre in 1972, and the Entebbe Hostage Taking in 1976, with over 100 Jewish hostages kidnapped and held in Uganda.

In December 1987, the First Intifada began. It was a Palestinian uprising against Israeli rule in the Palestinian territories. The rebellion began in the Jabalia refugee camp and quickly spread. Palestinian actions ranged from civil disobedience to violence. In addition to general strikes, boycotts on Israeli products, graffiti and barricades, demonstrations included youths throwing stones at Israeli soldiers. The army responded to the demonstrations with live ammunition, beatings and mass arrests, bringing international condemnation. The PLO, which had never been recognized as the Palestinians' representative, was invited to peace negotiations after it recognized Israel and renounced terrorism.

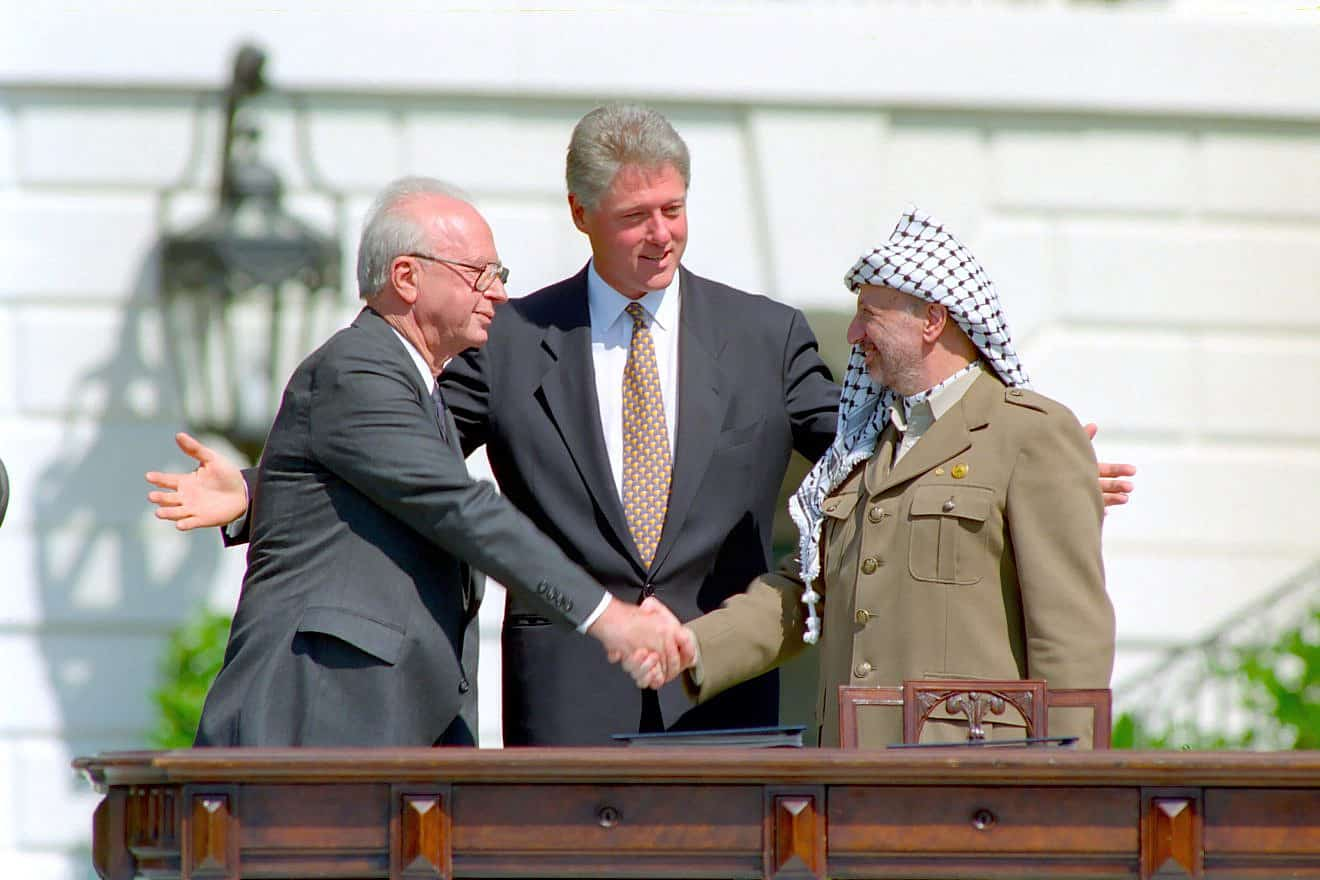
Yitzhak Rabin, Bill Clinton, and Yasser Arafat at the Oslo Accords signing ceremony on 13 September 1993

In mid-1993, Israeli and Palestinian representatives engaged in peace talks in Oslo, Norway. As a result, in September 1993, Israel and the PLO signed the Oslo Accords, known as the Declaration of Principles or Oslo I. In side letters, Israel recognized the PLO as the legitimate representative of the Palestinian people, while the PLO recognized Israel's right to exist and renounced terrorism, violence and its mission to destroy Israel. Oslo II was signed in 1995.

=== 2000–2005 ===
The Al-Aqsa Intifada launched a series of suicide bombings and attacks. The Israeli army launched Operation Defensive Shield in March 2002. It was Israel's largest military operation since the Six-Day War.

As violence intensified, Israel expanded its security apparatus around the West Bank by re-taking many parts of land in under the PLO's full control (Area A). Israel established a system of roadblocks and checkpoints to deter violence and protect Israeli settlements. However, in 2008, the IDF began to slowly transfer authority to Palestinian security forces.

Israel's then prime minister Ariel Sharon began a policy of disengagement from the Gaza Strip in 2003. This policy was fully implemented in August 2005, including the mandatory evacuation of all 17 Jewish settlements there. This was the first reversal for the settler movement since 1968. The disengagement from Gaza shocked Sharon's critics both on the left and on the right. It was supported by Trade and Industry Minister Ehud Olmert and Tzipi Livni, the Minister for Immigration and Absorption, but Foreign Minister Silvan Shalom and Finance Minister Benjamin Netanyahu condemned it.

=== 2006–present ===
==== Conflicts in Gaza and Lebanon ====
In June 2006, Hamas militants infiltrated an IDF post near the Gaza border and abducted soldier Gilad Shalit. Two IDF soldiers died; Shalit was wounded when his tank took an RPG hit. Israel launched Operation Summer Rains three days later to secure his release. Hamas held him, denying International Red Cross access, until 18 October 2011, when he was swapped for 1,027 Palestinian prisoners.

In July 2006, Hezbollah fighters crossed into Israel, killed eight soldiers, and abducted two, igniting the 2006 Lebanon War and heavy destruction in Lebanon. A UN ceasefire took effect 14 August. The war killed over 1,000 Lebanese and over 150 Israelis, devastated infrastructure, and displaced ~1 million Lebanese and 300,000–500,000 Israelis (most later returned). Parts of Southern Lebanon stayed uninhabitable from unexploded Israeli cluster munitions.

In the June 2007 Battle of Gaza, Hamas seized the Strip from rival Fatah in civil war. Israel then restricted borders, halted economic ties with Gaza's leadership, and—with Egypt—imposed a blockade. On 6 September 2007, Israel bombed a suspected Syrian nuclear site in Operation Orchard. It had struck Syria in 2003. In April 2008, President Bashar al-Assad told a Qatari paper that Syria and Israel discussed peace via Turkey; Israel confirmed. Talks covered the Golan Heights. Secretary Rice criticized surging West Bank settlements (up 1.8× from 2007). A six-month Hamas–Israel truce lapsed on 19 December 2008; renewal failed. Israel raided a suspected kidnap tunnel, killing Hamas fighters. Hamas fired >60 rockets on 24 December. Israel launched Operation Cast Lead on 27 December. Human rights groups accused both sides of war crimes. Israel imposed a 10-month West Bank settlement freeze in 2009.

In May 2010, Israeli naval forces raided six Gaza Freedom Flotilla ships that refused to dock at Ashdod. On MV Mavi Marmara, clashes killed nine activists. Global condemnation strained Israel–Turkey ties; Israel later eased the blockade. Dozens of passengers and seven soldiers were injured, some commandos shot.

After 2010–2011 talks, 13 Hamas-led groups launched a campaign to disrupt them. Attacks rose after August, including the killing of four civilians. Rocket fire intensified. On 2 August, militants fired seven Katyushas at Eilat and Aqaba, killing one Jordanian and wounding four.

Israel and Palestine Recognition of only Israel Recognition of both Israel and Palestine Recognition of only Palestine No data

Intermittent clashes persisted, including Hamas 680 rockets in 2011. On 14 November 2012, Israel killed Hamas military leader Ahmed Jabari, starting Operation Pillar of Defense. An Egyptian-brokered ceasefire began 21 November. Hamas rocket escalation prompted an Israeli Gaza operation on 8 July 2014. Another 11-day round erupted in May 2021.

Hamas-led attacks in October 2023 triggered war with massive destruction, displacement and a humanitarian crisis.

==== Syrian Civil War ====
Israel's military role in the Syrian Civil War was limited to missile strikes, which were officially acknowledged in 2017. While Israel officially stayed neutral, Israel was opposed to Iran's presence in Syria. Israel provided humanitarian aid to Syrian war victims, an effort that expanded in June 2016 when Israel launched Operation Good Neighbour. Hezbollah are suspected of carrying out attacks against Israeli positions on the border between Syria and Lebanon, and Israel is suspected of carrying out air strikes against convoys transporting weapons to such organizations.

On 9 December 2017, US president Donald Trump announced the United States recognition of Jerusalem as the capital of Israel, prompting condemnation by other world leaders as well as the 2018 Gaza border protests. The United States Embassy opened in Jerusalem on 14 May 2018.

==== Abraham Accords ====
The Abraham Accords are a set of agreements that established Arab–Israeli normalization between Israel and several Arab states, beginning with the United Arab Emirates (UAE) and Bahrain. Announced in August and September 2020 and signed in Washington, D.C. on September 15, 2020, the Accords were mediated by the United States under President Donald Trump.

The UAE and Bahrain became the first two Gulf Arab countries to formally recognize Israel and establish friendly relations. The signing by the UAE and Bahrain also made them the first Arab League states to recognize Israel since Mauritania in 1995 and Jordan in 1994. In 1979, Egypt was the first Arab League state to recognize Israel.

In the months following the Accords, Sudan and Morocco also agreed to normalize relations with Israel. As of 2024, Sudan's agreement remains unratified. In July 2025, it was reported that the second Trump administration was seeking to expand the Accords to include Syria, Lebanon, and Saudi Arabia, and in November, it was announced that Kazakhstan agreed to join. In December 2025, Prime Minister Benjamin Netanyahu expanded the Accords on his own initiative after Israel recognized Somaliland (Note: Israel is the only UN member to recognize Somaliland.) as an independent country, with Somaliland pledging to join the Accords.

The Abraham Accords emerged amid growing unofficial cooperation between Israel and Sunni Arab states throughout the 2010s, driven by shared concerns about Iran. Efforts to build ties had become increasingly public by 2018, with visits by Israeli officials to Gulf states and the start of limited military and intelligence cooperation. In mid-2020, a normalization deal between Israel and the UAE was brokered in exchange for the suspension of Israeli plans to annex parts of the West Bank, as proposed in the Trump peace plan.

The agreements formalized economic, diplomatic, and security cooperation. In Morocco's case, normalization came with U.S. recognition of Moroccan sovereignty over Western Sahara. For Sudan, it included removal from the U.S. list of state sponsors of terrorism and access to international financial support. The Accords were presented in elaborate ceremonies and widely promoted by the Trump administration as a major diplomatic achievement.

Reactions in the Arab world were mixed. While governments expressed support, public opinion in many countries remained opposed, particularly due to the Accords' lack of progress on resolving the Israeli–Palestinian conflict. Despite this, the Accords led to new initiatives in trade, defense, energy, technology, and cultural exchange. The name "Abraham Accords" was chosen to reflect the shared heritage of the Abrahamic religions—Christianity, Islam and Judaism.

In May 2026 president Trump suggested that some of Israel's neighbors should be required to sign the Abraham Accords and recognize Israel as part of a peace deal in the war with Iran.

== Notable wars and violent events ==
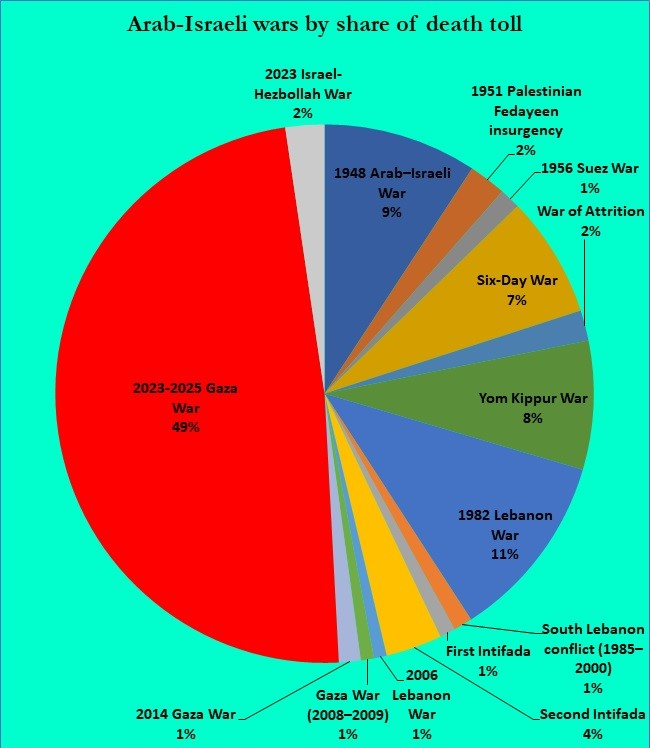
Pie chart of the share of percentage of the casualties in the Arab-Israeli conflicts since 1948

Time	Name	Israeli deaths	Arab deaths	Notes
1948–1949	1948 Arab–Israeli War	6,373	10,000	Israeli victory, independence confirmed; Jordan occupies and annexes the West Bank and Egypt captures and occupies the Gaza Strip
1951–1955	Palestinian Fedayeen insurgency	Unknown	3,000–5,000	Israeli victory
1956	Suez Crisis	181	2,000	Israeli military victory, Egyptian political victory Israeli occupation of the Sinai Peninsula until March 1957
1967	Six-Day War	803	12,000–13,000	Israeli victory Israel captures and occupies the Gaza Strip and Sinai Peninsula from Egypt, the West Bank from Jordan, and the Golan Heights from Syria
1967–1970	War of Attrition	738	2,500	Both sides claim victory, continued Israeli control of Sinai
1968–1982	Palestinian insurgency in South Lebanon			Israeli victory
1973	Yom Kippur War	2,688	11,000–13,000	Inconclusive, Arab offensives repulsed Camp David Accords followed by Egypt–Israel peace treaty; Israel fully returns the Sinai in exchange for mutual recognition and restricting Egyptian military access in the Sinai
1978	1978 South Lebanon conflict	18	1,100	Israeli victory, PLO expelled from southern Lebanon
1982	1982 Lebanon War	654	19,085	Israeli tactical victory but strategic failure Syrian political advantage PLO expelled from Lebanon
1982–2000	South Lebanon conflict (1985–2000)	652	1,276	Hezbollah victory Israeli withdrawal from southern Lebanon
1987–1993	First Intifada	182	1,491	Israeli victory, uprising suppressed, followed by the Oslo Accords and the creation of the Palestinian Authority
1991	1991 Iraqi missile attacks against Israel	13	0	Iraqi strategic failure, Iraq fails to provoke Israeli retaliation
2000–2008	Second Intifada	1,053	4,973	Israeli victory, uprising suppressed
2006	2006 Lebanon War	165	1,191	Inconclusive
2008	Gaza War (2008–2009)	13	1,391	Inconclusive
2012	2012 Gaza War	6	167	Inconclusive
2014	2014 Gaza War	73	2,251	Inconclusive
2023–present	Gaza war	~2,000	~74,000 –84,000	Ceasefire, ongoing
2023–present	Israel–Hezbollah conflict	~200	~8,920	Ceasefire, ongoing
2023–present	Red Sea crisis	2	260–345+	Ceasefire, ongoing

== Cost of conflict ==
A report by the Strategic Foresight Group estimated the opportunity cost of conflict for the Middle East from 1991 to 2010 at $12 trillion. The report's opportunity cost calculates the GDP of countries in the Middle East by comparing the historical GDP to the potential GDP given ongoing peace. Israel's share was almost $1 trillion, and cost Iraq and Saudi Arabia approximately $2.2 and $4.5 trillion, respectively. Had there been peace and cooperation between Israel and Arab League nations since 1991, the average Israeli citizen was estimated to be earning over $44,000 instead of $23,000 in 2010.

Buzan estimated that the conflict had taken 92,000 lives (74,000 military and 18,000 civilian from 1945 to 1995).

== See also ==
- One-state solution
- Two-state solution
- International law and the Arab–Israeli conflict
- Media coverage of the Arab–Israeli conflict
- Arab League and the Arab–Israeli conflict
- Soviet Union and the Arab–Israeli conflict
- Foreign relations of Israel
- Israel–European Union relations
- Timeline of the Israeli–Palestinian conflict
- Policide
- Muhammad's views on Jews
- Conflict: Middle East Political Simulator
- Civil defense in Israel
- List of wars involving Israel
- Israeli casualties of war
- Palestinian casualties of war
- Palestinian political violence
- Sykes–Picot Agreement
- Zionist political violence
- List of wars by death toll
- History of the Israel Defense Forces
- Media coverage of the Israeli–Palestinian conflict
