= August 2010 West Bank shooting attack =

Terrorist incident in the West Bank

- Part of the 2010 Palestinian militancy campaign
- Location of Kiryat Arba, West Bank
- Location: 31.5421°N 35.1307°E; Route 60, West Bank near Kiryat Arba
- Date: August 31, 2010
- Attack type: Drive-by shooting
- Deaths: 4 civilians
- Perpetrator: Hamas

The August 2010 West Bank shooting attack was an attack near the Israeli settlement of Kiryat Arba in the Israeli-occupied West Bank, carried out by Hamas militants. Four Israeli settlers from the settlements of Beit Hagai and Efrat were killed after militants attacked their vehicle. It was the deadliest Palestinian attack on Israelis in over two years.

Hamas hailed the attack as "heroic" and promised further attempts to kill "illegal settlers" in the West Bank. Hamas supporters in Jabalia publicly celebrated the killings. The attack was condemned by the United Nations, Israel and the Palestinian Authority.

The assailants were arrested by the Palestinian Authority but promptly released after Hamas accused the authority of treason. On 8 October, Israel arrested militants connected with the attack in a raid in which two Hamas operatives were killed.

== The attack ==
A couple and two additional people hitching a ride were driving on Route 60 close to the settlement of Kiryat Arba. Near the entrance of the settlement, Hamas militants began firing on the vehicle, killing the driver and forcing the car off the road. According to witnesses, the attackers then approached the car and shot the occupants in their seats at close range.

The police believe that militants in the Palestinian drive-by shooting opened fire from a vehicle driving alongside the victim's car. A paramedic with Magen David Adom described the scene to a journalist, saying that he saw "a car that was pierced with dozens of bullets and inside there were four bodies. There was absolutely no chance of helping."

=== Arrests ===
Hamas declared the arrest of the attackers by the Palestinian Authority "treason." All of the arrested suspects were "quickly" released, reminding the editorial staff of The Washington Post of "Palestinian leader Yasser Arafat's duplicitous response to acts of terrorism."

== Victims ==
One of the murdered couples was from a settlement of Beit Hagai in Hebron Hills. Their names were Yitzhak and Tali Aymes, ages 45 and 47. They were the parents of 6 children, ranging in age from 5 to 24, and of 1 grandchild. Tali was 9 months pregnant at the time of her death. Yehuda Glick became guardians of the six Aymes orphans (besides caring for six children and two foster children of their own).

Kochava Even Chaim, a teacher in Efrat with an eight-year-old daughter, was killed. Her husband was among the paramedics who responded to the shooting and discovered that one of the victims was his wife.

The fourth victim was Avishai Shindler, who had recently moved with his wife to live in Beit Haggai.

Thousands of people attended funerals as the victims were buried in Jerusalem, Ashdod, and Petah Tikva.

== Reactions ==
=== Hamas ===
Abu Ubaida, spokesman for the Izz ad-Din al-Qassam Brigades, claimed "full responsibility" for the attack and described it as a "heroic operation." In a separate statement, Hamas spokesman Sami Abu Zuhri said, "Hamas blesses the Hebron operation and considers it as a normal reaction to the occupation crime."

In a later CNN interview a Hamas leader living in Damascus, Khaled Mashal, vowed "resistance" if the international community did not force Israel to return to its 1967 borders. When asked about the August attacks he stated that Hamas would continue to "kill illegal settlers on our land," although Hamas did not actually carry out any such attacks in the forthcoming period.

==== Celebration ====
In the city of Jabalia in northern Gaza, "hundreds" of Hamas supporters celebrated the killings in the street after the evening prayer, as an imam urged them on over the loudspeakers of the mosque in the hours before Hamas acknowledged responsibility for the killings. In Gaza city, more than 3,000 Palestinians celebrated the attack.

Hamas legislator Mushir al-Masri spoke at the celebration, criticizing Mahmoud Abbas for entering negotiations on the grounds that Abbas is "representing only himself." According to Masri, killing the four Israelis "was the Palestinian people’s response to the talks."

==== Part of a political strategy ====
According to an unnamed Israeli security official, this was the start of a Hamas campaign of "terrorist attacks" designed to foil the 2010 peace talks. Two days after the shootings, Hamas announced the formation of an alliance of 13 militant groups to launch a wave of "more effective attacks" against Israel, not ruling out suicide bombings when questioned.

Other analysts believe that the "true target" of the spate of attacks is the Palestinian Authority.

==== Abduction plan ====
According to Al-Ahram an Egyptian newspaper, Hamas had originally planned to abduct the bodies, hoping to secure a mass prisoner release for their return. The abductors had also reportedly hoped to sabotage the peace talks by provoking the IDF into launching a large-scale search for the victims in the Palestinian territories. These plans were foiled by the arrival of another car on the scene, causing the killers to flee.

=== Israel ===
Israeli defense minister Ehud Barak referred to the attack as a "very grave incident" and said the Israeli military will "do everything they can to capture the murderers."

Israeli Prime Minister Benjamin Netanyahu dispatched Yuval Diskin and Gabi Ashkenazi, and directed them to respond to the attack without "any diplomatic constraints against the murderers, and act aggressively against those who sent them."

Israeli Vice Prime Minister Silvan Shalom, who was acting prime minister at the time of the incident because Prime Minister Netanyahu was abroad, said, "There are those who continue to take the path of terror and are busy killing innocents," and "Today it is clearer more than ever that the real obstacle to peace is terrorism and the extremists who will do anything to send the entire region up in flames. It is incumbent on the Palestinian Authority to fulfill its obligations in the territories that are under its purview."

=== Palestinian Authority ===
Palestinian Authority President President Mahmoud Abbas said that the attack in the Hebron was designed to "disrupt the peace process. and can't be regarded as an act of resistance."

Prime Minister Salam Fayyad condemned the attack and said it was designed to "undermine the PLO's efforts to rally international support for the Palestinians's demands." He said that the attack was in contradiction with the national interests of the Palestinians and the PA's strategic vision.

Palestinian security forces arrested up approximately 250 Hamas supporters in the West Bank, Hamas called the arrests an act of "treason."

=== Settlers ===
Israeli settlers were reportedly "enraged" by the attack. The chair of the South Mount Hebron settlers’ council, Tzviki Bar-Hai, asserted in an interview with a broadcast journalist that "for the past 100 years there has been a link between the Jewish people’s desire to live and the Arab people’s desire to kill us." The day after the attack, several dozen settler youths stoned Palestinians near Beit Hagai—home of the four shooting victims—and attempted to set fire to a Palestinian field in the locality. A second group of settlers entered a Palestinian neighborhood in Hebron and attempted to stone residents.

Yesha Council, the largest of the Israeli settler organizations announced that it would stop obeying the Israeli government's construction freeze at 6 p.m. Wednesday, September 1, mere hours before peace talks are scheduled to begin in Washington, D.C., and that construction would go forward on "hundreds" of new homes in the settlements. The Palestinian Authority countered by announcing that it would pull out of the peace talks if the building freeze ends. A spokesman for the Israeli government said that the construction freeze would continue thorough September 26 as scheduled, and that Israel would proceed with the peace talks. However, he also said that attacks of this kind make it difficult for Israel to make compromises to achieve a peace agreement.

On September 1, 2010, in a direct response to the shooting, activist settlers and "hundreds" of members of Likud holding placards that read "They shoot, we build" began construction in settlements across the West Bank, including a structure at the entrance to Kiryat Arba, near the site of the attack.

=== International ===
Human Rights Watch responded by calling on Hamas to cease attacks on civilians. Ban Ki-moon, Secretary-General of the United nations, said that "this attack must be recognized for what it is: a cynical and blatant attempt to undermine the direct Israeli-Palestinian negotiations starting tomorrow."

=== Military ===
Palestinian Authority and Israel forces started arresting Hamas supporters. Israeli forces killed Iyad Shilbaya, a commander of the Izz ad-Din al-Qassam Brigades, twelve others were arrested in the overnight operation between September 16 and 17. Hamas' military wing said it was responsible for the killing at the end of August of four Israeli settlers in the West Bank.

== Political ramifications ==
In a "fiery" speech shortly after the killings, Hamas leader Mahmoud Zahar rejected peace negotiations, asserting that "liberating" all of the land between the Jordan River and the Mediterranean Sea is a religious and a moral duty.

According to The Wall Street Journal, this and a second Hamas shooting in the West Bank two days later, "cast a shadow" over face to face peace talks between Israel and the Palestinian Authority just as they were about to begin in Washington, D.C. The Palestinian Authority responded to the shootings by arresting "dozens" of suspected Hamas activists in the West Bank.

According to The New York Times, the immediate Hamas claim of responsibility is out of the ordinary since in recent years Hamas has "refrained" from claiming responsibility for attacks. However, the reduction in rocket attacks on Israel launched form Gaza had brought pressure on Hamas from Palestinian Arabs who question the group's commitment to fighting Israel. According to The Wall Street Journal, the attack "seemed aimed at torpedoing a new round of peace talks in Washington this week between Israel and the Palestinians." Both Israel and the Palestinian Authority "seized" the attack as an opportunity to press an agenda; Israel demanded firm guarantees that a West Bank controlled by the Palestinian Authority would not be used a base for attacks on Israel, and the Palestinian Authority demanded that Israeli settlements be removed.

An editorial in The Washington Post suggested that this incident would "cast a substantial shadow over the talks" citing two reasons. Like The New York Times Hamas's unusual assertion of responsibility was cited along with their further resolve to continue such attacks. A demonstration in Gaza in support of the attack was further cited as evidence that Hamas would not accept negotiations conducted by Mahmoud Abbas on their behalf. The editorial secondly echoed Israel's concern that under Palestinian rule the West Bank could become a base for attacks against Israel.

== Israeli response ==
On 8 October 2010 the IDF raided several buildings in Hebron where the militants suspected of carrying out the attack were holed up. Two of the suspects were killed upon storming the house and six others were arrested. The two dead were:

- Nashaath al-Karmi (33), a senior Hamas member from Tulkarm. Karm had previously been imprisoned for terror-related activities but was freed in August 2009, after which he quickly returned to working for Hamas' military wing.
- Mamoun al-Natshe (24), a low-level Hamas militant from Hebron. Natshe had been imprisoned in Israel for several months in 2008.

Hamas swore revenge for the operation and congratulated the Palestinians of Hebron for "continuing to sacrifice shaheeds in the fight against Israel". The Islamist group also derided the Palestinian Authority (PA) for the ongoing 2010 Israeli-Palestinian peace talks and sharply criticized Fatah for what it called Fatah's complicity in the operation and its persecution of Hamas, stating that Hamas would "not ask for Fatah's permission... to carry out more attacks".

The Palestinian Authority officially condemned the operation, but PA sources said privately that the Palestinian security establishment welcomed the elimination of al-Karmi because it would weaken the power of rival Hamas in the West Bank.

Israeli Defense Minister Ehud Barak praised the security forces for the success of the operation: "The actions in Hebron are a rapid response to the murder of four Israelis in August of this year near Kiryat Arba. The IDF and security forces will continue to work everywhere with uncompromising determination against terror organizations to ensure continued peace in Judea and Samaria".

== See also ==
- 2010 Palestinian militancy campaign
- Tapuah junction stabbing
- 2015 Shuvat Rachel shooting
