= 2010 Palestinian militancy campaign =

2010 campaign to derail peace talks

- Part of the Gaza–Israel conflict and the Israeli–Palestinian conflict
Date	June 14 – September 26, 2010 (3 months, 1 week and 5 days)
Location	Israeli-occupied West Bank with spillover into Israel
Result	Hamas-led victory: Direct peace talks between the Palestinian Authority and Israel broke down by late September

Belligerents
Israel	(Palestine) Palestinian militias in the West Bank; Hamas; Palestinian Islamic Jihad; Popular Resistance Committees; Fatah splinter groups; Fatah al-Intifada (suspected)

Units involved
Israel Police; Israel Border Police	(Hamas) Al-Qassam Brigades; Al-Quds Brigades; Al-Nasser Salah al-Deen Brigades; Al-Aqsa Martyrs' Brigades

Casualties and losses
1 policeman killed 3 policemen injured (Israel) 4 civilians killed (Israel) 4 civilians injured	(Palestine) Unknown

The 2010 Palestinian militancy campaign was a coordinated effort by 13 Palestinian militant groups, led by Islamist group Hamas, to derail peace talks between Israel and the Palestinian Authority. The campaign consisted of attacks against Israelis in the Israeli-occupied West Bank and Israel in which, according to a Hamas declaration in early September, "all options are open". The participating groups also included Palestinian Islamic Jihad, the Popular Resistance Committees and an unnamed splinter group of Fatah. Some Israeli and Palestinian officials and analysts familiar with Hamas believe that the true target of the campaign is the Palestinian Authority, which is led by Mahmoud Abbas of Fatah.

== Hamas statements and responses ==
Hamas leader Mahmoud al-Zahar was reported by CBS News as saying that Muslims have a moral and religious duty to liberate the land between the Mediterranean and the Jordan River, and that armed resistance is the way to achieve this. Al-Zahar has urged Mahmoud Abbas to immediately pull out of peace talks with Israel, asserting that "armed struggle was the only way to deal with the Jewish state."

Hamas leader Hamas military leader Abu Ubaida told The Washington Post in September that the Hamas military wing is operating "in harmony with the attitude of the political wing," based in Damascus, Syria. Abu Ubaida, who is a spokesman for the military wing of Hamas, further said that resistance will be stepped up and that all options were open. "We declare that the actions of resistance have gone into a new and advanced stage of co-operation in the field at the highest levels in preparation for more effective attacks against the enemy." According to the Palestinian Authority and Israeli security officials, Hamas has the capacity to carry out more attacks in the West Bank, particularly drive-by shootings since these require little planning or manpower, but probably lacks the ability to carry out attacks on Israel inside the Green Line due to surveillance activities and the effectiveness of the Israeli West Bank barrier.

Khaled Mashal has said the "resistance" will continue if Israel doesn't withdraw to the 1967 borders and that Hamas will resume to "kill illegal settlers on our land."

According to Jonathan Fighel, a senior researcher at the International Institute for Counter-Terrorism, the campaign constitutes a decision by Hamas to begin a new wave of terrorism aimed at Israeli settlers. He said "it's a strategic, political decision from the Hamas leadership in Damascus to express their dismay and rejection of the peace talks taking place in Washington... They are showing they have operational capabilities and a willingness to act in Judea and Samaria", referring to the West Bank as "Judea and Samaria". According to the Israeli news site Debka.com, in late September Hamas was preparing to expand its "terror campaign."

The Palestinian news agency paltimes.net praised the attacks and linked them to the negotiations:

"There, in Washington, Abbas is rewarding the occupation by improving its image through futile negotiations, while in Hebron the Al-Qassam Brigades, despite Abbas's whining and attacks on the resistance, agreed to nothing but vengeance for the blood of the shahids. Today, heads and body parts are scattered in all directions. Today, the Al-Qassam Brigades negotiate with their enemies by means of rifles and blood...

The attacks caused embarrassment to the Palestinian Authority, and the attacks in Hebron and Ramallah were condemned by Mahmoud Abbas. The Palestinian Authority minister Mahmoud Habbash accused Iran of responsibility for the Hamas attacks in attempts to derail the peace talks, and insinuated that Hamas leader Haled Mash'al was guilty of heresy.

In an interview in October 2010, the Palestinian reformist Zainab Rashid criticized Syria and Iran, which she says deliberately attempted to derail the peace process in order to divert attention from their own domestic problems and suppress initiatives of democratization. She said, "The most convincing proof is the attempts of these regimes to make deceitful and callous use of the Palestinian cause and to manipulating Palestinian elements in order to spark disputes. They miss no opportunity to sabotage peace efforts, as we saw at the outset of the latest round of Palestinian-Israeli negotiations, when Hamas received a directive from the Syrian and Iranian regimes which control it to carry out two attacks in the West Bank, shortly before the first session of peace talks, with the intent of undermining the negotiations. This is what all the dictatorships have done throughout the history of this struggle in order to prevent its resolution.

== Shooting attacks ==
=== June 14 ===
June 2010 West Bank shooting
- Location: Route 60, West Bank (near Beit Hagai)
- Date: June 14, 2010; 7:15 – 7:18 am (approximate)
- Target: Israeli police officers
- Attack type: Highway shooting ambush
- Deaths: 1
- Injuries: 1 moderate, 2 light
- Perpetrator: Palestinian Fatah claimed responsibility

In a drive-by shooting attack near Hebron West Bank on 14 June, Israeli police officer Yehoshua Sofer was killed and three others were wounded.

Al-Aqsa Martyrs' Brigades, an armed wing of Palestinian President Mahmoud Abbas's Fatah party, claimed responsibility for the attack, stating that it was a response to the recent 2010 Gaza flotilla raid.

In July 2010, following a joint operation by the IDF, Shin Bet, and Israel Police, a Palestinian man, Baha Eladam, was identified as the shooter and arrested, and other Palestinians were arrested as accomplices. Eladam and three other Palestinians convicted of participated in the attack were sentenced to life in prison, while another Palestinian received a 25-year sentence for assisting the attack.

=== August 31 ===
August 2010 West Bank shooting
- Location: Route 60, West Bank near Kiryat Arba
- Date: August 31, 2010
- Target: Israeli motorists
- Attack type: drive-by shooting
- Deaths: 4
- Injuries: 0
- Perpetrator: Hamas

The first notable attack in the Hamas campaign, in which 4 Israelis were shot to death. Hamas spokesman Abu Ubaida said, "this attack is a chain in a series of attacks, some have been executed, and others will follow". Ma'an News Agency reported that an Israeli security official said that this was one of a series of "terrorist attacks" designed to foil the 2010 peace talks. Khaled al-Batsh, a leader of Islamic Jihad, endorsed the Hamas killings, asserting that ""negotiations can only be stopped by a barrage of bullets."

Journalist Daoud Kuttab described the August 31 attack as "clearly timed to disrupt the talks and weaken the position of the Palestinian delegation." United Nations Secretary General Ban Ki-moon stated the day after the incident that "this attack must be recognized for what it is: a cynical and blatant attempt to undermine the direct Israeli-Palestinian negotiations starting tomorrow."

On October 8, Israeli special forces killed a senior West Bank Hamas operative responsible for the attack. IDF soldiers entered several buildings in Hebron where Palestinian militants were holed up inside, killing two of the suspects and arresting six others.

=== September 1 ===
1 September 2010 West Bank shooting
- Location: Route 60, West Bank between Rimonim Junction and Kochav Hashachar
- Date: September 1, 2010
- Target: Israeli motorists
- Attack type: drive-by shooting
- Deaths: 0
- Injuries: 2
- Perpetrator: Hamas

Rabbi Moshe and Shira Morano, an Israeli couple in their 30s from Ma'ale Efraim in the Jordan Rift Valley, were shot in their car by Palestinian gunmen while driving on Highway 60 between the Rimonim Junction and the Jewish community of Kochav Hashachar. The man was moderately hurt from shrapnel wounds to his legs and a bullet in the shoulder, and the woman was lightly hurt from blows as result of the vehicle overturning.

The victims jumped out of their car into a ditch after one of the assailants' automatic rifles jammed, where they used a cellphone to call for help. The vehicle veered off the road and plunged down an embankment. Magen David Adom paramedics treated them at the scene before evacuating them to Hadassah Hospital in Ein Kerem.

Rabbi Morano said a car tailgated them for about five minutes, blinding them with its headlights. "I signaled to the driver that he was bothering me and that he should pass me, but he took a long time to respond. Then, as we came around a bend, he came past me and the shooting started... One of the guns seemed to jam and that gave us the chance to roll away and take cover. I knew if they reached us, they would spray us with bullets at point blank range. I unlocked the door and pulled my wife out, and we rolled into the ditch."

Hamas claimed responsibility for the attack. Spokesman Abu Ubaida stated that "The attack was a message to those who pledged to the Zionist enemy there would be no more attacks."

Palestinian Authority (PA) President Mahmoud Abbas did not condemn the attack, but said: "We are not interested in spilling Israeli blood. We want the two peoples to live regular lives in real peace." A PA official blamed Hamas for "trying to return the West Bank into a state of anarchy, in order to thwart the political process." The following week, PA security officials announced that they had arrested two Hamas operatives in connection with the attack.

=== September 26 ===
26 September 2010 West Bank shooting
- Location: Route 60, West Bank near Teneh Omarim
- Date: September 26, 2010
- Target: Israeli motorists
- Attack type: Drive-by shooting
- Deaths: 0
- Injuries: 2
- Perpetrators: Claimed responsibility: Fatah, Islamic Jihad; suspected: Fatah al-Intifada

The 26 September 2010 West Bank shooting took place near Teneh Omarim, on Route 60 in the West Bank. Nine-month pregnant Israeli woman Neta Schoker and her husband Sharon, both 35, were in their vehicle when gunmen in a passing Palestinian car opened fire on them. Both the husband and wife sustained gunshots to their legs, and managed to drive themselves to Soroka Hospital in Beersheba. The woman gave birth by Cesarean section to a healthy baby boy, and received treatment for her wounds. A second car was also fired at in the same attack, but none of its passengers were injured.

The attack took place close to where the August 2010 West Bank shooting occurred. According to Israeli police, the assailants' vehicle fled the scene southwards. Israeli soldiers set up roadblocks at the entrance to the adjacent Palestinian village of Dahariya and searched homes.

The military wings of Fatah (the party of Palestinian President Mahmoud Abbas) and Palestinian Islamic Jihad claimed responsibility for the attack. The groups declared in a statement that "the attack was carried out to mark the 15th anniversary of the killing of the Islamic Jihad's founder Fathi Shaqaqi." However, some members of both organizations denied having any knowledge of the statement.

In October, the Israel Security Agency arrested three members of Fatah al-Intifada, a Fatah splinter group, on suspicion of carrying out the attack. The suspects told investigators that they were given $25,000 with which to buy weapons and that they planned on carrying out more attacks. The suspects were charged in a military court on 29 November.

== Rocket attacks ==
Palestinian rocket attacks on Israel increased in September. On September 14, senior Hamas operative Ahmed Jaabari threatened to increase attacks against Israel to derail the Israeli-Palestinian peace talks. "With the power of faith, weapons and missiles, tunnels and commandos we will achieve victory for Palestine and we'll end the occupation in Gaza too," he said. The next day, two mortar shells containing white phosphorus were fired into Israel from Gaza. Ten rockets landed in the Eshkol region during the day. A 122-mm. Katyusha rocket landed north of Ashkelon. The IDF understood the rocket attacks to be part of a Hamas attempt to torpedo the peace talks.

== See also ==
- Itamar killings
- Second Intifada
- Tapuah Junction stabbing
