= Meir Pichhadze =

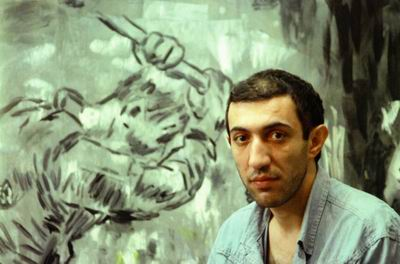

Meir Pichhadze (Hebrew: מאיר פיצ'חדזה; August 16, 1955 in Kutaisi, Georgia – February 4, 2010 in Tel Aviv, Israel) was an Israeli artist and painter.

Pichhadze began studying art as a child with the sculptor Razu Ramishvili. He moved with his family to Israel in 1973. There his work revealed influences of the primitivist stylings of Georgian painter Niko Pirosmanashvili.

In 1983, Pichhadze began studying at the Kalisher College of Art. His first exhibition was at the school's newly opened gallery. He was known for his unusual style, most notably for painting on a black canvas instead of the traditional white canvas.

Pichhadze died after a six-month battle with cancer.
