= Echad Ha'am 101 =

Israeli television series

Echad Ha'am 101 (Hebrew: אחד העם 101) is an Israeli sitcom and spin-off of the series Echad Ha'am 1, which was broadcast in Israeli channel 2 in 2003.

The first episode of Echad Ha'am 101 was broadcast on July 5, 2010.

== Plot ==
Echad Ha'am 101 tells the story of Miri Paskal, an edgy, slightly insane parking inspector in Tel Aviv. After her husband, Ruben, dies in an accident during rehearsal for a German war victims' ceremony, Miri receives much money from his inheritance, and decides to move from her small tenement in Ramat Gan to a luxury tower in Tel Aviv.

Meanwhile, her daughter, Yafit, gets pregnant and immediately marries Yaron, her boss in a hot dog restaurant. While Miri gets busy with her new rich life, she slowly forgets her old loved friends.
