= Beit Hagai =

Israeli settlement in the West Bank

Beit Hagai: בֵּית חַגַּי (Hebrew)

Hebrew transcription(s)
  - Official: Haggay
  - Unofficial: Hagai
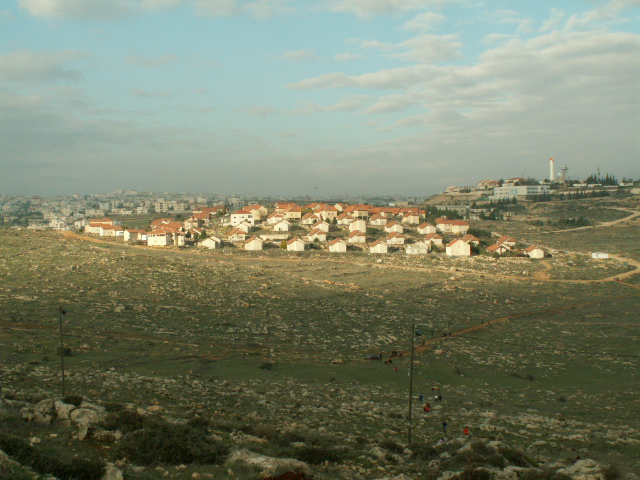

- Location within the Southern West Bank
- Coordinates: 31°29′35″N 35°4′51″E
- Country: Palestine
- District: Judea and Samaria Area
- Council: Har Hevron
- Region: West Bank
- Affiliation: Amana
- Founded: 1984
- Population (2024): 851
- Website: pisrael.com/betHagay/

Beit Hagai (Hebrew: בֵּית חַגַּי, Arabic: بيت حجاي), also Hagai, is an Israeli settlement organized as a community settlement located in the southern Hebron Hills in the West Bank. The settlement population was 460 in 2004, according to a classified government document published by the Haaretz newspaper, and lies within the municipal jurisdiction of the Har Hevron Regional Council. The religious Jewish community's name, Haggai, is an acronym of the given names Hanan Krauthammer, Gershon Klein, and Yaakov Zimmerman, three Nir Yeshiva (Kiryat Arba) students murdered in the 1980 Hebron terrorist attack. The community rabbi for Beit Hagai is Rabbi Moshe Eliezer Rabinovich (HaLevy). In 2024 it had a population of 851. The international community considers Israeli settlements in the West Bank illegal under international law, but the Israeli government disputes this.

== History ==
Beit Haggai was established in 1984 by former classmates of the victims and their families, with assistance from the Amana organization, the settlement branch of the Israeli right wing organization Gush Emunim. In 1989, the residents of Beit Hagai founded a special needs children's village which has provided a home, education, and services for dozens of young people.

In 1991 the Israeli state, through the World Zionist Organization's land settlement unit, granted Beit Haggai a 49-year lease to operate the largest stone quarry in the West Bank, and quarry royalties constitute 80 percent of the community's revenues.

During the First Intifada Beit Haggai was targeted by the Palestinian uprising. Several residents were killed in shooting attacks by Palestinians near the village. In the years of the Second Intifada, another three settlers were killed on the roads leading into and out of Beit Hagai. Israeli settlers living in Beith Hagai were also responsible for violence against Palestinians. The population of the village doubled between the years 2001 and 2007, and today there are approximately 95 families in the settlement.

In the summer of 2006, the village welcomed a group of families who had been evacuated from Kfar Darom, Gush Katif, as a part of Israel's disengagement from the settlements in the Gaza Strip. The group established a new settlement, and also reopened the kollel for dayanim which had operated in Kfar Darom. The Kollel is named Or Yosef (Light of Joseph) after Yossi Shuk, a resident of the village, who had been killed during the Palestinian uprising in December 2005.

Also in 2006, an additional new settlement was established. This initiative was part of the building plan of the village. Likewise, an observation point in memory of Yossi Shuk was built on nearby Rehavam Hill (named after Rehavam "Gandhi" Ze'evi).

On August 31, 2010 four residents of Beit Hagai—Yitzhak and Tali Ames, Kochava Even Haim and Avishai Schindler—were shot dead by local Palestinian militants while driving a car near the settlement. Izz ad-Din al-Qassam Brigades, the military wing of the Palestinian organization Hamas, claimed responsibility for the attack.

== Community ==
Most inhabitants of the settlement work in Kiryat Arba or in the surrounding Har Hebron area. Some, however, even travel as far north as Jerusalem or south as Be'er Sheva to work. Many of the settlers are involved in education. Some of the residents work in the youth village. There are approximately 15 yeshiva students (In Hebrew, avreichim) who live in Beit Hagai.

The community maintains a close connection with the families of the three boys for whom the village is named, and every year, on the anniversary of their murder, "Shabbat Hagai" is commemorated in memory of the three. Their families are hosted for that weekend by the community.

Central buildings in Beit Hagai are; a central synagogue, a Sephardic synagogue, children's daycare centers and an infant daycare center, a medical clinic, a mikvah, a celebration hall, a Bnei Akiva branch and more.
