= 2010–2011 Israeli–Palestinian peace talks =

Diplomatic attempts to resolve the Israel-Palestine conflict in 2010 and 2011; failed

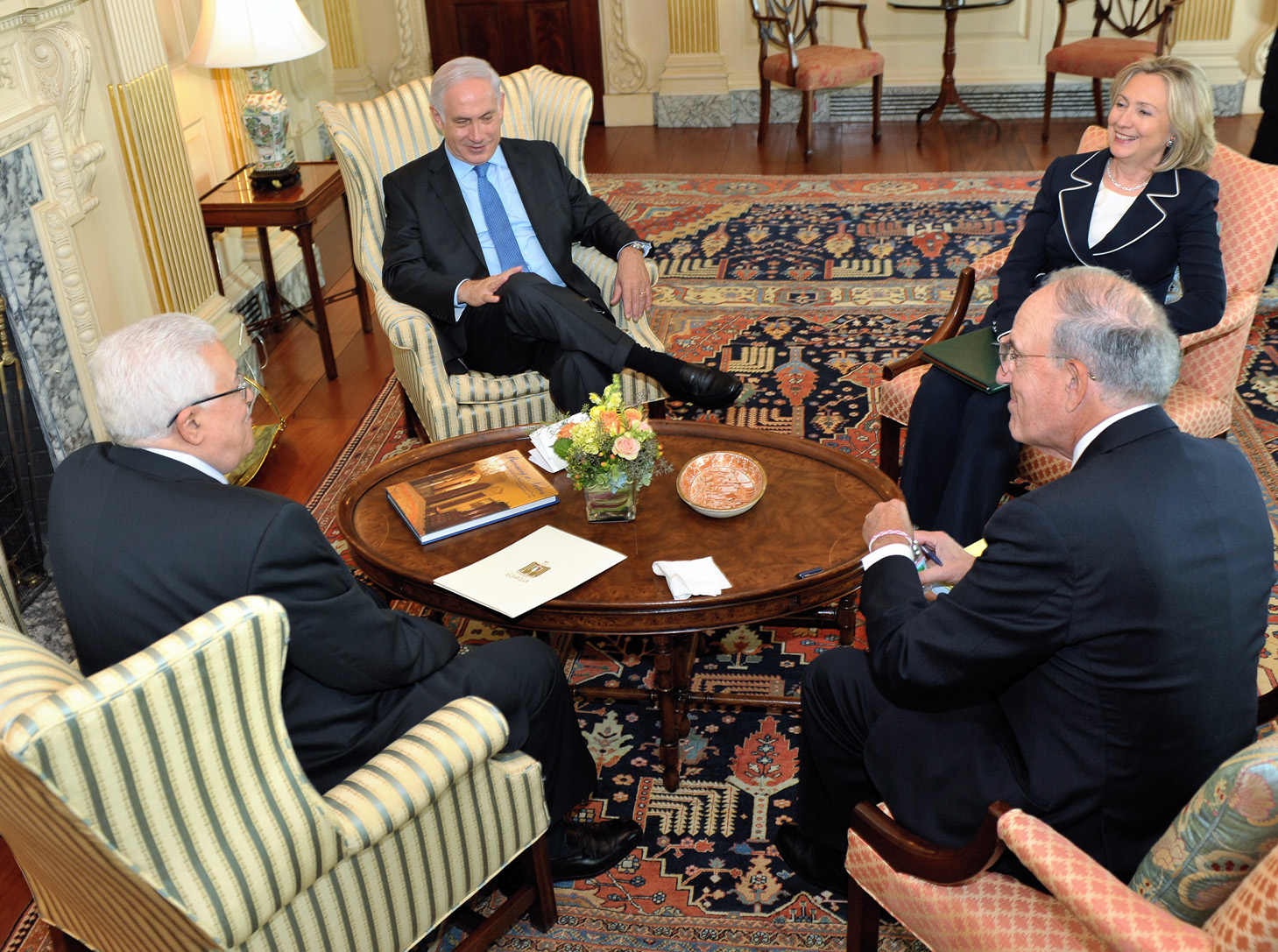
Benjamin Netanyahu, Mahmoud Abbas, George J. Mitchell and Hillary Clinton at the start of direct talks on September 2, 2010.

Direct negotiations between Israel and the Palestinian National Authority took place throughout 2010 as part of the peace process, between United States President Barack Obama, Israeli Prime Minister Benjamin Netanyahu, and Palestinian Authority Chairman Mahmoud Abbas. The ultimate aim of the direct negotiations is reaching an official "final status settlement" to the Israeli–Palestinian conflict by implementing a two-state solution, with Israel remaining a Jewish state, and the establishment of a state for the Palestinian people.

In early 2010, Benjamin Netanyahu, imposed a ten-month moratorium on settlement construction in the West Bank as a gesture for the Palestinian Authority, after previously publicly declaring his support for a future Palestinian state, however he insisted that the Palestinians would need to make reciprocal gestures of their own. The Palestinian Authority rejected the gesture as insufficient. Nine month later, direct negotiations between Israel and the PA relaunched, after nearly two years of stalemate.

In early September, a coalition of 13 Palestinian factions began a campaign of attacks against Israeli civilians, including a series of drive-by shootings and rocket attacks on Israeli towns, in an attempt to derail and torpedo the ongoing negotiations.

Direct talks broke down in late September 2010 when an Israeli partial moratorium on settlement construction in the West Bank expired and Netanyahu refused to extend the freeze unless the Palestinian Authority recognized Israel as a Jewish State, while the Palestinian leadership refused to continue negotiating unless Israel extended the moratorium. The proposal was rejected by the Palestinian leadership, that stressed that the topic on the Jewishness of the state has nothing to do with the building freeze. The decision of Netanyahu on the freeze was criticized by European countries and the United States.

== Background ==
Direct negotiations between the Palestinian Authority and the Israeli government have continued for many decades and remain a complicated issue to resolve.

When President Barack Obama took office in January 2009, he has made peaceful settlement of the Israeli–Palestinian conflict a top priority of his administration, appointing former Senator George Mitchell as his peace envoy.

In March 2009 US Secretary of State Hillary Clinton traveled to Israel. She said that Israeli settlements and demolition of Arab homes in East Jerusalem were "unhelpful" to the peace process. Clinton also voiced support for the establishment of a Palestinian state. Prime Minister-designate Benjamin Netanyahu supports Palestinian self-government but did not explicitly endorse US and Palestinian visions for Palestinian statehood. Upon the arrival of President Obama administration's special envoy, George Mitchell, Netanyahu stated that any resumption of negotiations with the Palestinians will be conditional on the Palestinians recognizing Israel as a Jewish state. So far the Palestinian leadership has rejected a US-backed proposal extending a settlement freeze in exchange for recognizing Israel as a Jewish state, as this issue had not been sufficiently clarified by Israel at that time.

On June 4, 2009 Obama delivered a speech at the Cairo University in Egypt in which Obama addressed the Muslim world. The speech called for a "new beginning" in relations between the Islamic world and the United States. With respect to the Israeli-Palestinian conflict, the President stated that "the only resolution is for the aspirations of both sides to be met through two states" and called upon both Israel and the Palestinians to resume negotiations. In addition, during the speech Obama added that "The United States does not accept the legitimacy of continued Israeli settlements" as it "undermines efforts to achieve peace. It is time for these settlements to stop."

On June 14, in what was understood as a response Obama's Cairo speech, Netanyahu gave a speech at Bar-Ilan University in which he endorsed, for the first time, a "Demilitarized Palestinian State", after two months of refusing to commit to anything other than a self-ruling autonomy when coming into office. Netanyahu also stated that he would accept a Palestinian state if Jerusalem were to remain the united capital of Israel but open to all religions, the Palestinians would have no military, and the Palestinians would give up their demand for a right of return. He also claimed the right for a "natural growth" in the existing Jewish settlements in the West Bank while their permanent status is up to further negotiation. In general, the address was viewed as a significant turnaround from his previously hawkish positions against the Israeli–Palestinian peace process.

On July 12, 2009, Mahmoud Abbas told Egyptian media that he would not cede any part of the West Bank to Israel, that he would demand territorial contiguity between the West Bank and Gaza Strip, and that he would never waive the Palestinian right of return. In a letter to U.S. President Barack Obama, Abbas demanded that any peace deal be based strictly on the 1967 borders and the Arab Peace Initiative. Palestinian negotiator Saeb Erekat rejected any "middle ground solutions", saying that the Palestinians would reject any deal between the U.S. and Israel that would allow any construction to continue in Israeli settlements.

On 23 August 2009, Netanyahu announced in his weekly cabinet meeting that negotiations with the Palestinians will begin in September 2009 and will be officially launched on his visit to New York, after he had accepted an invitation from President Barack Obama for a "Triple Summit" there. He added that there is progress with special envoy George Mitchell, though there is no full agreement on everything, and there will be more rounds of meetings until September. On the same day, a spokesman for PA President Mahmoud Abbas said there would be no negotiations so long as Israel continued West Bank settlement construction.

On 20 September 2009, the White House announced that it will host a three-way meeting between President Obama, Prime Minister Netanyahu and PA President Mahmoud Abbas, within the framework of the United Nations General Assembly, "in an effort to lay the groundwork for renewed negotiations on Mideast peace." The meeting took place on 22 September, in New York. Afterwards, Netanyahu said that he agreed with Abbas during the meeting that peace talks should be relaunched as soon as possible.

== 2010–2011 Israeli–Palestinian peace talks ==
On 25 November 2009, Israeli Prime Minister, Benjamin Netanyahu, imposed a 10-month construction freeze on all of its settlements in the West Bank. Calling it "a painful step that will encourage the peace process" and urged the Palestinians to respond. Israel's decision was widely seen as due to pressure from the Obama administration, which urged the sides to seize the opportunity to resume talks. The Palestinian Authority rejected the gesture as being insignificant due to the limited construction on some pre-approved housing units, failure to extend the freeze to East Jerusalem, and failure to dismantle already-built settlement outposts illegal under Israeli law. The Palestinians refused to enter negotiations, despite Israeli appeals to do so.

A partial freeze on construction in East Jerusalem, which Israel annexed in 1980, and regards as its sovereign territory, was imposed under the observation of U.S. consular officials, though not acknowledged by the Israeli government. On 19 July, Israeli Prime Minister Netanyahu froze a major construction project in Pisgat Ze'ev as a "diplomatic gesture" to the United States. However, some construction continued, and the Obama administration voiced disappointment over the matter, stating that it viewed construction there as a violation of the settlement freeze. On 10 March 2010, Israel approved the construction of 1,600 apartments in the Ramat Shlomo neighborhood during a visit by US Vice President Joe Biden, sparking a diplomatic crisis between Israel and the United States.

A partial step towards full negotiations took place around the middle of March 2010, as Israeli and Palestinian teams began indirect negotiations through US intermediaries. These negotiations were interrupted within few days by the Palestinian Authority in protest of Israeli actions in East Jerusalem. They were renewed in May of that year. On 10 May 2010, Israel joined the OECD. Previously, Palestinian Prime Minister Salam Fayyad had written to the organization, urging it to suspend Israel's application, and before the vote, called numerous OECD heads of state to lobby against Israeli membership. Palestinian Authority Foreign Minister Riyad al-Malki also wrote to OECD members that accepting Israel would legitimize its "racist" and "dangerous" policies towards Palestinians.

On 31 May 2010, relations between Israel and the Palestinians were further strained when Israel carried out the Gaza flotilla raid. Palestinian President Mahmoud Abbas stated that "Israel has committed a massacre", and declared a three-day mourning period. Palestinian official Mustafa Barghouti said that the attack would lead to the international boycott growing in strength, and called Israel "the most despicable state in the world". Prime Minister Salam Fayyad also criticized the attack.

On 8 July 2010, Palestinian President Mahmoud Abbas told the Arab League that the Palestinian Authority would abandon peace talks and attack Israel if the Arab states would invade, saying "if you want war, and if all of you will fight Israel, we are in favor. But the Palestinians will not fight alone because they don't have the ability to do it".

In August 2010 Barack Obama and Hillary Clinton stated that a Palestinian state was possible to achieve within one year.

A renewed effort to negotiate peace was initiated by the Obama administration by getting the parties involved to agree to direct talks for the first time in a long while. U.S. President Barack Obama was successful in obtaining support for direct talks from Egypt and Jordan. The Egyptian and Jordanian governments managed to persuade the Palestinian leadership to accept Israel's settlement freeze and enter direct talks nine months after the start of the freeze. The aim of the talks was to forge the framework of a final agreement within one year on a two-state solution, although general expectations of a success were fairly low.

On September 2, after ten months and seven rounds of indirect talks that began in November 2009, U.S.-brokered direct negotiations between Israel and the Palestinian Authority began in Washington D.C. On September 14 a second round of Middle East peace talks between Israel and the Palestinian Authority concluded in Sharm el-Sheikh, Egypt. Palestinian Authority President Mahmoud Abbas stated that during the talks, the Palestinian Authority and Israel agreed on the principle of a land swap, with Israel exchanging small parts of its own territory in exchange for border settlement blocs. The issue of the ratio of land Israel would give to the Palestinians in exchange for keeping border settlement blocs was an issue of dispute, with the Palestinians demanding that the ratio be 1:1, and Israel offering less.

During the direct negotiations between Israel and the Palestinians, Hamas and Hezbollah reaffirmed to threat peace talks if both sides were matriculated towards any possible agreement. A Hamas-led coalition of 13 Palestinian militant groups initiated a violent campaign to disrupt peace talks between Israel and the Palestinian Authority. A series of attacks killed and wounded eight Israelis, including two pregnant women, between August and September 2010. Israeli and Palestinian Authority security forces responded with raids that resulted in the deaths and arrests of militants involved in the attacks. Rocket and mortar attacks from the Hamas-run Gaza Strip also increased in September.

On September 21, 2010 Palestinian Prime Minister Salam Fayyad stormed out of a meeting in New York, which was held as part of the Ad Hoc Liaison Committee (AHLC) meetings, and canceled a scheduled joint press conference with the Israeli President Shimon Peres and Israeli Deputy Foreign Minister Danny Ayalon following Ayalon's demand that the meeting summary refer to the notion of "two states for two peoples", meaning Israel as a Jewish state alongside a Palestinian state, rather than a Palestinian state alongside a bi-national Israel. Ayalon later commented on the event, stating: "What I say is that if the Palestinians are not willing to talk about two states for two peoples, let alone a Jewish state for Israel, then there's nothing to talk about", and that "if the Palestinians think that they can create one Palestinian state and one dual-nationality state, this will not happen".

President Obama indicated in a speech to the United Nations he held on September 23, 2010 that he was hopeful of a diplomatic peace within one year. Contrary to popular belief, Israel did not boycott the speech, but did not attend due to the Jewish holiday of Sukkot.

As the Israeli 10-month freeze on settlement construction was nearing its expiration date on September 26, Mahmoud Abbas stated that he would abandon the negotiations if settlement construction was renewed. He said "Israel has a moratorium for 10 months and it should be extended for three to four months more to give peace a chance." In the view of the Palestinian Authority leadership, Israeli construction of settlements constitutes Israel's imposition of "facts on the ground" in the West Bank, and is a violation of international law. See generally, International law and Israeli settlements

On September 22, the Knesset passed a law requiring a public referendum and the votes of at least 60 Knesset members ahead of any withdrawal from East Jerusalem or the Golan Heights. The law was criticized by the Palestinian Authority and the Arab League.

On September 25, a day before the Israeli settlement freeze's expiration, Palestinian Authority President Mahmoud Abbas claimed in the United Nations General Assembly that Israeli settlements were a key issue, stating that "Israel must choose between peace and the continuation of settlements". The United States pushed Israel to extend the settlement freeze.

Despite Palestinian and international pressure to extend the Israeli 10-month moratorium in construction of new Israeli settlement homes in the West Bank, on September 26 the ten-month settlement freeze expired at 22.00 (GMT). Israel's prime minister Benjamin Netanyahu called on West Bank settlers to "show restraint" following the end of the freeze. Several Israeli right-wing politicians called for a swift resumption of construction, and backed settlers' plans to resume building as soon as possible.

Avigdor Lieberman, the Israeli Foreign Minister and leader of the Yisrael Beiteinu party, rebuffed claims that the renewal of West Bank settlement construction was a provocative move meant to torpedo the peace talks. Lieberman said the Palestinians failed to accept the gesture of the moratorium for nine months and "now they are pressuring Israel to continue the very freeze they rejected." Lieberman said Israel was ready to enter peace talks with no preconditions. Lieberman also ruled out that a Palestinian state will be established in the coming of two years.

The rejection to extend the moratorium was harshly criticized worldwide. Abbas stated that Netanyahu cannot be trusted as a 'genuine' peace negotiator if the freeze is not extended.

On October 2, 2010 the Palestinian President Mahmoud Abbas stated that peace negotiations will not continue until Israel imposes a new freeze for the construction of Israeli settlements in the West Bank, thus putting a de facto halt to the current Israel-Palestine peace negotiations.

On October 4, 2010, Netanyahu stated that the Israelis were working behind the scenes with the United States to resolve the issues and resume talks. Israeli sources had said that this would involve a 60-day extension of the freeze. Israeli ambassador to the United States Michael Oren said that the United States had offered Israel "incentives" for an extension of the freeze.

Chief Palestinian negotiator Nabil Shaath accepted a US proposal to extend the West Bank settlement freeze by another two months. Sha'ath said the Palestinians accept such a limited extension provided the two sides can reach an agreement on the borders between Israel and a future Palestine in those two months.

After a meeting in Libya on 8 October 2010, the Arab League leaders announce their support for Palestinian Authority President Mahmoud Abbas's decision to stop peace talks with Israel over the expiration of the 10 month Israeli moratorium on construction in the West Bank. The Arab League also stated that it would give the United States another month to persuade Israel to renew the settlement moratorium and that "The committee will convene again in a month to study the alternatives".

On 11 October 2010, during a speech at the opening of the third session of the 18th Knesset, Israeli Prime Minister Benjamin Netanyahu offered a settlement freeze if the Palestinian Authority would declare its recognition of Israel as the homeland of the Jewish people. The Palestinian Authority quickly rejected Netanyahu's proposal and stated that the issue of the Jewishness of the state has nothing to do with the matter. The proposal was immediately rejected by the Palestinian Authority. Palestinian President Abbas said that "We will never sign an agreement recognizing a Jewish state", and Chief negotiator Saeb Erekat said that Palestinian President Abbas stressed that he would never sign an agreement recognizing Israel as a Jewish state". Speaking on behalf of the Palestinian Authority, chief negotiator Saeb Erekat stated on October 11 that the PA "forcefully reject all these Israeli games. The racist demands of Netanyahu cannot be tied to the request to cease building in the settlements for the purpose of establishing a state." Palestinian negotiators announced that their recognition of the Jewish state would undermine the rights of Israeli-Arabs, and eliminate the right of return for millions of Palestinian refugees to Israel proper.

On October 15, it was reported that Israel had approved new construction in East Jerusalem.

On 13 October 2010 Yasser Abed Rabbo, the secretary general of the PLO, stated in a press statement that the PLO would recognize Israel as a "Jewish state" in exchange for a sovereign Palestinian state within the 1967 borders which would include East Jerusalem stating that "Any formulation the Americans present – even asking us to call Israel the 'Chinese State' – we will agree to it, as long as we receive the 1967 borders. We have recognized Israel in the past, but Israel has not recognized the Palestinian state." Abed Rabbo's statements were immediately disowned by the Palestinian political factions, mainly because his remark were viewed as conceding the right of return for millions of Palestinian refugees to Israel proper. The Fatah movement called for Abed Rabbo's immediate resignation. Palestinian negotiator Nabil Shaath dismissed Abed Rabbo's statements and claimed that "Abed Rabbo's statements don't represent the views of the PLO or Fatah movement or President Abbas". In addition, the Hamas government in Gaza called for the immediate resignation of Abed Rabbo.

In November 2010, the U.S. government offered Israel a package of incentives in exchange for an agreement by the Israeli government to a 90-day freeze on settlement construction in the West Bank excluding East Jerusalem. The centerpiece of the deal was a military aid package worth $3 billion, including delivery of 20 additional F-35s, various missile and layered defense systems, and an explicit acceptance of the legitimacy of existing security needs and a commitment not to redefine them. In addition to security provisions, the proposed incentive package also included a U.S. promise to veto any U.N. Security Council resolution relating to the peace process during the agreed upon negotiating period and a guarantee that the U.S. would not ask Israel to extend the 90-day moratorium when it expired. The Security Cabinet of Israel considered the offer. Former Ambassador Dan Kurtzer, commenting on the deal said: "But now, the administration says it is prepared to pay off Israel to freeze only some of its settlement activity, and only temporarily. For the first time in memory, the United States is poised to reward Israel for its bad behavior." Palestinian President Mahmoud Abbas rejected the U.S. freeze proposal, as it did not include East Jerusalem, while Chief Negotiator Saeb Erekat reiterated demands for unconditional recognition of the 1967 borders, and for withdrawal from all of East Jerusalem.

On December 2, a Palestinian official announced that Washington had officially informed the PA that Israel had refused to agree to a new settlement freeze.

Israeli Defense Minister Ehud Barak tried to restart negotiations by imposing a de facto settlement freeze by blocking building plans in the West Bank settlements. Ariel Mayor Ron Nachman threatened to sue Barak.

Israeli Prime Minister Benjamin Netanyahu visited Egypt and met with President Hosni Mubarak. Netanyahu urged Mubarak to pressure Abbas into direct talks.

According to Dr. Mohammad Shtayyeh, a senior Palestinian negotiator who spoke at a conference hosted by the Brookings Institution's Doha Center, the Palestinian leadership used the cessation of direct talks to adopt a new strategy with the goal of declaring an independent state of Palestine. The initial step of this strategy was to ask the international community to recognize an independent Palestine along 1967 borders, to which the achieved some success in late 2010 and early 2011. Several Latin American countries recognized the State of Palestine, including Brazil, Argentina, Chile, Ecuador, Bolivia, Venezuela, and Uruguay. This was met with fierce opposition from Israel, which claimed that early recognition was a violation of the Road Map.

In January 2011, Israeli Foreign Minister Avigdor Lieberman proposed an interim peace deal, in which a Palestinian state would be established initially on 50% of the West Bank, with final borders to be negotiated at a later date. The proposal was rejected by the Palestinians, with Chief Negotiator Saeb Erekat claiming that Lieberman's plan represented Prime Minister Netanyahu's position as well, stating "the Israeli government is not headed towards peace, because it is not interested in peace, and this plan is proof of that".

On January 16, 2011, Israel presented to accept a plan to build some 1400 more homes in Gilo, a neighborhood in east Jerusalem, bringing condemnation from the Palestinians and Israeli left.

In February 2011, Israel offered to ease economic and security restrictions against the Palestinians, which reportedly included allowing additional Arab construction in East Jerusalem, giving the Palestinian Authority security control in seven West Bank cities, and discussing a proposed Palestinian Authority gas field alongside an Israeli one off the coast of Gaza, on condition that the Palestinian Authority resume direct talks. The proposal was agreed to by Middle East Quartet chief Tony Blair, and rejected by the Palestinians. Palestinian negotiator Saeb Erekat called the Israeli proposal "just a trick and procrastination", stating that "what Netanyahu should do, if he wants to build confidence, is immediately stop settlement construction in the West Bank and East Jerusalem and recognize a Palestinian state on the territories occupied in 1967", called on Western nations to "stop dealing with Israel as if it is above the law", and "reach a historic decision that will recognize a Palestinian state within the 1967 borders and East Jerusalem as its capital", and urged the Quartet to force Israel to halt settlement construction "including in Jerusalem". The following day, Israel approved the construction of 13 additional Jewish homes in the East Jerusalem neighborhood of Sheikh Jarrah.

Shortly afterward, the Palestinian Authority announced an initiative to United Nations to recognize Hebron and Bethlehem as world heritage sites rather than Jewish heritage sites to prevent "Judaization". PA officials told local media that they hoped such recognition would stop the growth of Jewish settlements in the cities. Turkey assisted the initiative by providing archived Ottoman documents showing various sites in the two cities under Muslim rule. Researchers from Lebanon and Italy have also supported the initiative.

On 12 February 2011, Chief Palestinian Negotiator Saeb Erekat announced his resignation over the Palestine Papers scandal, which purportedly showed that he had agreed to wide-ranging concessions to Israel on the issues of Jerusalem, refugees, borders, and Israeli security, while still insisting that the documents were false.

On 18 February 2011, the United States vetoed a United Nations Security Council Resolution condemning Israeli settlement activity. U.S. Ambassador to the U.N. Susan Rice indicated in her remarks that the purpose of the U.S. veto was to demonstrate the Obama administration's intention that "the only way to reach that common goal [of peace] is through direct negotiations." This was met with mixed reactions by the Israeli and Palestinian leadership, as Netanyahu stated Israel's appreciation of the veto, while the Palestinian Authority condemned the U.S. for its "bias".

In March 2011, Israeli Prime Minister Benjamin Netanyahu reportedly considered a temporary peace deal that would see a Palestinian state established within provisional borders, with future borders negotiated at a later date, due to the Palestinians' refusal to negotiate. On March 3, the Palestinians rejected the idea, with official Saleh Ra'fat saying that the PLO's position is unchangeable, and President Abbas calling it "unacceptable".

Following the impasse in negotiations, the Palestinian Authority announced that unless a deal was reached by September 2011, it would unilaterally declare independence, seek recognition by the United Nations, and apply for membership in the organization. Palestinian President Mahmoud Abbas claimed that this new state would be ready to negotiate all the core issues, and that a key focus would be finding a "just solution" for Palestinian refugees in accordance with United Nations General Assembly Resolution 194. The Palestinian Authority subsequently refused to reenter negotiations or reconsider its plans for a declaration of statehood until Israel froze all settlement construction and agreed to a solution based on the 1967 borders. PLO official Yasser Abed Rabbo claimed that the new Palestinian state would not tolerate an Israeli military and civilian presence on its land, and would seek UN intervention.

In April 2011, Fatah and Hamas signed a unity agreement, and announced plans to form a joint government. Israel responded by temporarily freezing the transfer of customs funds Israel collects for the Palestinian Authority, but released them following guarantees that the money would not go to Hamas. Israeli Prime Minister Benjamin Netanyahu warned the Palestinian Authority that it would have to choose between peace with Israel or peace with Hamas.

Abbas accepted a French offer to host peace talks by July 2011. A few days later, US Republican congresswoman Ileana Ros-Lehtinen of Florida, chairwoman of the House Foreign Affairs Committee, announced plans to introduce legislation that would withhold US contributions to any UN entity that recognizes a Palestinian state or upgrades the status of the PLO observer mission. She claimed that this was in order to "oppose efforts by the Palestinian leadership to evade a negotiated settlement with Israel."

In July 2011, the Quartet on the Middle East convened, but did not come out with a statement. Israeli officials disclosed that the Quartet was unable to reach a statement following the Palestinians' refusal to accept clauses in the planned statement calling on the Palestinian Authority to withdraw its plans for a unilateral declaration of independence in September, to halt all demands from Israel once a two-state solution was reached, end incitement against Israel, or recognize it as a Jewish state.

In May 2012, Abbas reiterated his readiness to engage with the Israelis if they propose "anything promising or positive".

== Public reactions ==
=== The reactions of the Israeli public ===
In May 2011, a poll of 500 Israelis, commissioned by the Jerusalem Center for Public Affairs, found that 77% opposed going back to pre-'67 lines; that 85% and 75%, respectively, supported keeping all of Jerusalem under Israeli control within the framework of any peace agreement and opposed transferring the Temple Mount to Palestinian control, even if the Western Wall were to remain in Israeli hands; that 84% believed Israel must maintain control of the Jordan Valley, even in the framework of a final peace agreement; that 60% believed that defensible borders would ensure security more than a peace agreement would; and 82% considered security concerns more important than a peace deal.

=== The reactions of the Palestinian public ===
A 2011 poll found that 61% of Palestinians opposed and 34% supported the idea of "two states for two peoples." Some 66% agreed with the two-state solution, but only as a first step to the elimination of Israel. Though quotes in the Hamas Charter urging the elimination of Israel were found to be highly supported, most Palestinians supported the idea of peace talks over violence.

On 29 October 2010, tens of thousands of Islamic Jihad supporters participated in a demonstration in Gaza City's Kuteiba Square against the negotiations and making peace with Israel. The rally was organized by Islamic Jihad and enjoyed the participation of its rival, Hamas. Demonstrators shouted "Death to America and Death to Israel". Islamic Jihad chief Ramadan Shallah sent a recorded message saying that "Israel will not bring peace to the region, it will only bring war and destruction and therefore, the slogan of all should be that Israel must be wiped out of existence," and "The choice of negotiation has reached deadlock, and we are wondering why is there such an insistence by the Palestinian Authority on negotiation with the enemy [i.e., Israel]". Another leader, Mohammad al-Hindi, called for an end to the Palestinian Authority, and said, "Jihad is the fate of this nation. There is no other option but this one". Other Islamic Jihad officials said the turnout was a "referendum by the Palestinian people rejecting peace-making with Israel." Hamas leader Khalil Al-Hayya said, "There is only the choice of Jihad and nothing else".

== See also ==
- 2010 Palestinian militancy campaign
- Israeli–Palestinian peace process
- 2013 Israeli–Palestinian peace talks
