= Deaths in June 2011 =

The following is a list of notable deaths in June 2011.

Entries for each day are listed alphabetically by surname. A typical entry lists information in the following sequence:

- Name, age, country of citizenship at birth, subsequent country of citizenship (if applicable), reason for notability, cause of death (if known), and reference.

== June 2011 ==
=== 1 ===
- Jaehoon Ahn, 70, North Korean-born American journalist and researcher, founding director of Radio Free Asia's Korean language service., complications from a bleeding ulcer.
- Cameron Batjer, 91, American lawyer.
- Munir Dar, 76, Pakistani field hockey player, 1960 Olympic gold medalist.
- Matt Fong, 57, American politician, California State Treasurer (1995–1999), skin cancer.
- Muhammad Nawaz, 54, Pakistani army major general, helicopter crash.
- Frank Ponta, 75, Australian paralympian, long illness.
- Devi Prasad, 89, Indian artist and peace activist.
- Haleh Sahabi, 54, Iranian humanitarian, daughter of Ezzatollah Sahabi, cardiac arrest.
- Albert Wiggins, 76, American Olympic swimmer, aortic dissection.

=== 2 ===
- Ray Bryant, 79, American jazz pianist, long illness.
- Mark Cooney, 60, American football player (Green Bay Packers).
- Ron Dunn, 83, Australian rules footballer.
- Willem Duys, 82, Dutch radio and television presenter and record producer, infection.
- Josephine Hart, 69, Irish-born British novelist and poetry promoter, ovarian cancer.
- Sir Philip Holland, 94, British politician, MP for Acton (1959–1964); Carlton (1966–1983) and Gedling (1983–1987).
- Davorin Marčelja, 87, Croatian Olympic athlete.
- Walter R. Peterson Jr., 88, American politician, Governor of New Hampshire (1969–1973). Died of lung cancer.
- Willie Phiri, 57, Zambian footballer.
- Geronimo Pratt, 63, American political activist (Black Panther Party), heart attack.
- Philip Rahtz, 90, British archaeologist.
- Joel Rosenberg, 57, American science fiction author, heart attack.
- Albertina Sisulu, 92, South African anti-apartheid activist.
- Keith Smith, 93, Australian radio and television personality (The Pied Piper), children's writer.
- Lavina Washines, 71, American tribal leader, first female leader of the Yakima Nation (2006–2008).

=== 3 ===
- James Arness, 88, American actor (Gunsmoke, How the West Was Won, Them!).
- Harry Bernstein, 101, British-born American author.
- Wally Boag, 90, American performer (Golden Horseshoe Revue).
- Marion Fuller Brown, 94, American politician and environmental activist.
- Papa Joe Chevalier, 62, American sports talk radio host, stroke.
- Bruce Crozier, 72, Canadian politician, Ontario MPP for Essex South (1993–1999) and Essex (since 1999), aortic aneurysm.
- Andrew Gold, 59, American singer-songwriter ("Lonely Boy", "Thank You for Being a Friend"), heart attack.
- Pat Jackson, 95, English film and television director.
- John Henry Johnson, 81, American football player (San Francisco 49ers, Pittsburgh Steelers) and Hall of Famer.
- Miriam Karlin, 85, British actress ("So Haunt Me") and activist, cancer.
- Ilyas Kashmiri, 47, Pakistani jihadist militant, leader of Harkatul Jihad al-Islami, drone strike.
- Jack Kevorkian, 83, American physician and right to die activist, pulmonary thrombosis.
- Bhajan Lal, 80, Indian politician, Chief Minister of Haryana (1979–1985; 1991–1996), cardiac arrest.
- Peter Murphy, 88, Irish television presenter (RTÉ).
- Sammy Ofer, 89, Israeli businessman, long illness.
- Ray Pahl, 75, British sociologist, cancer.
- Jack Richardson, 89, Australian politician, member of the New South Wales Legislative Assembly for Ashfield (1952–1953).
- Benny Spellman, 79, American R&B singer, respiratory failure.
- Gus Tyler, 99, American socialist activist.
- Jan van Roessel, 86, Dutch Olympic footballer (Willem II Tilburg).

=== 4 ===
- Dimi Mint Abba, 52, Mauritanian singer, brain haemorrhage.
- Dante Ambrosio, 59, Filipino ethnologist, astronomer, college professor, and activist.
- Shibli al-Aysami, 86, Syrian politician and Arab nationalist figure.
- Lilian Jackson Braun, 97, American author (Cat Who series), natural causes.
- Claudio Bravo, 74, Chilean painter, epilepsy.
- Tommy Brent, 88, American theatrical producer.
- Gordon Colling, 78, British trade unionist, Chair of the Labour Party (1994–1995).
- Lindsey Durlacher, 36, American Greco-Roman wrestler.
- Lawrence Eagleburger, 80, American diplomat and politician, Secretary of State (1992–1993).
- Curth Flatow, 91, German dramatist and screenwriter, natural causes.
- Maurice Garrel, 88, French actor.
- Donald Hewlett, 90, English actor, pneumonia.
- Juan Francisco Luis, 70, U.S. Virgin Islands politician, Governor of the United States Virgin Islands (1978–1987), Lieutenant Governor (1975–1978).
- Rosenery Mello do Nascimento, 45, Brazilian model and Playboy Playmate, brain aneurysm.
- Ian Mitchell, 86, English cricketer, natural causes.
- Robert Morgan, 72, Canadian historian and archivist.
- Andreas P. Nielsen, 58, Danish author and composer, cancer.
- Martin Rushent, 63, English record producer (Buzzcocks, Human League, The Stranglers).
- Betty Taylor, 91, American performer (Golden Horseshoe Revue).
- Misael Vilugrón, 73, Chilean boxer.
- Felix Zandman, 83, American entrepreneur.

=== 5 ===
- Mark H. Beaubien Jr., 68, American politician, member of the Illinois House of Representatives (since 1997).
- Léon Bollendorff, 96, Luxembourgish politician, President of the Chamber of Deputies (1979–1989).
- Scott Bostwick, 49, American football player and coach (Western Washington, Northwest Missouri State), heart attack.
- Leon Botha, 26, South African artist and musical performer, progeria-related heart failure.
- John Glasby, 82, British chemist and writer.
- Azam Khan, 61, Bangladeshi pop singer, cancer.
- Gordon Lorenz, 68, British songwriter.
- Ludo Martens, 65, Belgian political activist.
- Célestin Oliver, 80, French Olympic footballer.
- Ken Purpur, 79, American ice hockey player.

=== 6 ===
- John R. Alison, 98, American airman, launched the Allied Reoccupation of Burma during World War II.
- Rafael Arnal, 96, Venezuelan Olympic shooter.
- Zev Birger, 85, Israeli activist, traffic collision.
- John Boswall, 91, British actor (Nineteen Eighty-Four, Pirates of the Caribbean: Dead Man's Chest, EastEnders).
- Claudio Cavazza, 77, Italian entrepreneur, founder of Sigma-Tau pharmaceuticals.
- Bill Closs, 89, American basketball player (Philadelphia Warriors, Fort Wayne Pistons).
- Declan Costello, 84, Irish politician, TD for Dublin North-West (1951–1969); Dublin South-West (1973–1977), Attorney General (1973–1977) and High Court judge.
- Eleanor Dapkus, 87, American baseball player (All-American Girls Professional Baseball League), breast cancer.
- Dulce Figueiredo, 83, Brazilian First Lady (1979–1985), widow of João Figueiredo.
- Werner Fischer, 70, Austrian Olympic sailor.
- Benjamín González, 53, Spanish Olympic athlete, mountaineering accident. (body found on this date)
- James A. Green, 80, American Pennsylvania Commissioner of Elections, Pennsylvania State Representative, Butler County Commissioner, Slippery Rock Borough Council member.
- Stefan Kuryłowicz, 62, Polish architect, plane crash.
- Amnon Niv, 81, Israeli architect.
- Masushi Ouchi, 67, Japanese weightlifter, Olympic silver (1968) and bronze (1964) medalist.
- Shrek, 16, New Zealand celebrity sheep, euthanised.

=== 7 ===
- Ana Fabricia Córdoba, about 52, Afro-Colombian human rights activist, assassination
- Paul Dickson, 74, American football player (St. Louis Rams, Dallas Cowboys, Minnesota Vikings), blood infection.
- Angelino Fons, 75, Spanish film director.
- Walid Gholmieh, 73, Lebanese musician, director of Conservatoire Libanais.
- Genaro Hernández, 45, American former world super featherweight champion boxer, cancer.
- Liam Kelly, 88, Irish republican and politician.
- Kim Jun-yop, 91, South Korean historian.
- Vladimir Lavrov, 91, Soviet diplomat and ambassador.
- José Pagán, 76, Puerto Rican baseball player (San Francisco Giants, Pittsburgh Pirates), Alzheimer's disease.
- Mietek Pemper, 91, Polish-born German Holocaust survivor, compiled and typed Oskar Schindler's list.
- Nataraja Ramakrishna, 88, Indian dance guru, after long illness.
- Maksud Sadikov, 48, Russian Islamic scholar and theologian, shot.
- Jorge Semprún, 87, Spanish writer and politician.
- Leonard B. Stern, 87, American television writer (Get Smart, The Honeymooners) and publisher (Mad Libs).
- Edgar Tekere, 74, Zimbabwean politician, cancer.
- Gavriel Tsifroni, 96, Israeli journalist.
- Haim Yisraeli, 84, Israeli civil servant.

=== 8 ===
- Anatole Abragam, 96, French physicist.
- Larry Border, 60, American politician, member of the West Virginia House of Delegates (since 1990), stroke.
- Oliver Fiennes, 85, British Anglican priest, Dean of Lincoln (1969–1989).
- Nasir Jalil, 56, Singaporean footballer.
- George Landow, 67, American experimental filmmaker.
- Clara Luper, 88, American civil rights activist, after long illness.
- John Mackenzie, 83, Scottish film director (The Long Good Friday, Ruby).
- Paul Massie, 78, Canadian BAFTA-winning actor and educator.
- Fazul Abdullah Mohammed, 38?, Comorian al-Qaeda terrorist, planned 1998 United States embassy bombings, shot.
- Jim Northrup, 71, American baseball player (Detroit Tigers, Montreal Expos, Baltimore Orioles), seizure.
- Steve Popovich, 68, American record executive, founder of Cleveland International Records.
- Alan Rubin, 68, American trumpeter (The Blues Brothers), lung cancer .
- Roy Skelton, 79, British actor (Rainbow, Doctor Who), stroke.

=== 9 ===
- Jameel Fakhri, 65, Pakistani actor, long illness.
- M. F. Husain, 95, Indian artist, heart attack.
- Josip Katalinski, 63, Bosnian footballer, long illness.
- Tomoko Kawakami, 41, Japanese voice actress (Fushigi Yûgi, Revolutionary Girl Utena), ovarian cancer.
- Ali Khodadadi, 64, Iranian carpet weaver, heart failure.
- Mike Mitchell, 55, American basketball player (Cleveland Cavaliers, San Antonio Spurs), cancer.
- Idwal Robling, 84, Welsh Olympic footballer and broadcaster.
- Vladimir Shalin, 46, Russian football player and coach.
- Billy Shipp, 80, American football player (New York Giants, Toronto Argonauts, Montreal Alouettes).
- Ignazio Vella, 82, American artisanal cheesemaker and businessman, long illness.

=== 10 ===
- Art Balinger, 96, American actor.
- Jeanne Bice, 71, American entrepreneur and television personality.
- Pam Brown, 58, American politician, Nebraska state senator (1995–2006), ovarian cancer.
- Yuri Budanov, 47, Russian military officer and war criminal, shot.
- Cosimo Caliandro, 29, Italian middle-distance runner, motorcycle collision.
- Mary E. Clarke, 86, American army general.
- Theo Dubois, 100, Canadian rower.
- Abdishakur Sheikh Hassan, Somali politician, interior minister (since 2010), suicide bombing.
- Kenny Hawkes, 42, British DJ and music producer, after short illness.
- James P. Hosty, 86, American law-enforcement agent (FBI), prostate cancer.
- Esmond Kentish, 94, Jamaican Test cricketer.
- Sir Patrick Leigh Fermor, 96, British author and soldier.
- Brian Lenihan Jnr, 52, Irish politician, TD for Dublin West (since 1996) and Minister for Finance (2008–2011), pancreatic cancer.
- Godfrey Myles, 42, American football player (Dallas Cowboys), stroke.
- Franz Reitz, 82, German cyclist, National Champion (1957)
- Jim Rodnunsky, 54, Canadian-born American cinematographer and technician, inventor of the Cablecam system, brain cancer.
- Hoda Saber, 52, Iranian dissident, heart attack following a hunger strike.
- Al Schwimmer, 94, American-born Israeli businessman, founder of Israel Aerospace Industries.
- Barbara Starfield, 78, American paediatrician, advocate for primary health care.
- Carol Stone, 96, American actress (The Life and Legend of Wyatt Earp).
- György Szabados, 71, Hungarian physician, pianist, and composer.

=== 11 ===
- Tariq Alam Abro, 53, Pakistani writer, kidney failure.
- Paul Alter, 89, American television director (Family Feud).
- Giorgio Celli, 75, Italian entomologist and politician (The Greens–European Free Alliance).
- Gustav Ciamaga, 81, Canadian composer, music educator and writer, cancer.
- Robert Marie Jean Victor de Chevigny, 90, French-born Mauritanian Roman Catholic prelate, Bishop of Nouakchott (1973–1995).
- Jyotirmoy Dey, 56, Indian journalist, shot.
- Gunnar Fischer, 100, Swedish cinematographer (The Seventh Seal).
- Eliyahu M. Goldratt, 64, Israeli physicist and management guru.
- Noel Granger, 79–80, Australian Olympic wrestler.
- Kurt Nielsen, 80, Danish tennis player, only Dane to have played in a men's Grand Slam singles final.
- Jaime Pieras Jr., 87, Puerto Rican jurist.
- Graham B. Purcell Jr., 92, American politician, U.S. Representative from Texas (1962–1973).
- Seth Putnam, 43, American musician (Anal Cunt).
- Wolfgang Reinhardt, 68, German Olympic silver medal-winning (1964) pole vaulter.
- Raúl Marcelo Pacífico Scozzina, 89, Argentinian Roman Catholic prelate, Bishop of Formosa (1957–1978).
- Darko Radovanović, 35, Serbian singer, traffic collision.
- Vitali Silitski, 38, Belarusian political scientist, kidney cancer.
- Jack Smith, 82, British artist.
- William Carrington Thompson, 95, American politician and jurist, Virginia House of Delegates (1959–1968), Senate (1968–1973) and Supreme Court (1980–1983).
- Edythe Scott Bagley, 86, American author, activist, educator and older sister of Coretta Scott King.

=== 12 ===
- Les Abbott, 95, Australian rugby league footballer.
- René Audet, 91, Canadian Roman Catholic prelate, Bishop of Joliette (1968–1990).
- Geoffrey Fisken, 95, New Zealand World War II flying ace.
- Carl Gardner, 83, American singer (The Coasters).
- Alan Haberman, 81, American grocer, first to use the barcode system, heart and lung disease.
- John Hospers, 93, American philosopher, first Libertarian Party presidential nominee (1972).
- Christopher Neame, 68, British film and TV producer and writer, aneurysm.
- Kathryn Tucker Windham, 93, American author and journalist.
- Sir John Wilton, 89, British diplomat.
- Laura Ziskin, 61, American film producer (Pretty Woman, Spider-Man, What About Bob?), breast cancer.

=== 13 ===
- David C. Baldus, 75, American educator and anti-death penalty activist, cancer.
- Hugh John Beazley, 94, British Royal Air Force airman.
- Johannes Kemperman, 86, Dutch mathematician.
- King's Theatre, 20, Irish racehorse.
- Germano Meneghel, 49, Brazilian vocalist (Olodum).
- Jérôme Nday Kanyangu Lukundwe, 82, Congolese Roman Catholic prelate, Bishop of Kongolo (1971–2007).
- Betty Neumar, 79, American murder suspect.
- Romeo Olea, 49, Filipino radio journalist (DWEB), shot.
- William J. Spahr, 89, American intelligence analyst (CIA) and author, pneumonia.
- Burt Styler, 86, American screenwriter (The Carol Burnett Show, My Favorite Martian, All in the Family), Emmy winner (1972), heart failure.

=== 14 ===
- Tom Addison, 75, American football player (New England Patriots).
- Tayo Aderinokun, 56, Nigerian entrepreneur.
- Milivoj Ašner, 98, Croatian-born Austrian Nazi war criminal.
- Helen Clifton, 63, British Salvation Army commissioner.
- Ambrose Griffiths, 82, British Roman Catholic prelate, Bishop of Hexham and Newcastle (1992–2004).
- Asad Ali Khan, 74, Indian musician, recipient of the Padma Bhushan.
- Augusto Ramírez Ocampo, 77, Colombian politician, Mayor of Bogotá (1982–1984), Foreign Minister (1984–1986), heart ailment.
- Óscar Sambrano Urdaneta, 82, Venezuelan writer.
- Peter Schamoni, 77, German film director.
- Mack Self, 81, American rockabilly musician and songwriter.
- Badi Uzzaman, 72, Indian-British actor (Eastern Promises, Another Year, My Beautiful Laundrette), chest infection.
- Suprabha Devi, 73, an Assamese film producer and the first female director from Assam, India.

=== 15 ===
- Guy Amouretti, 85–86, French table tennis player.
- Bob Banner, 89, American television producer and director (The Carol Burnett Show), Parkinson's disease.
- Joko Beck, 94, American Zen Buddhist teacher, founder of the Ordinary Mind School, long illness.
- John Ehrman, 91, British historian.
- Ted Gray, 86, American baseball player (Detroit Tigers).
- Bill Haast, 100, American snake expert, director of the Miami Serpentarium.
- Zack du Plessis, 61, South African actor (Orkney Snork Nie).
- Linda Scheid, 68, American politician, Minnesota state senator (since 1997), ovarian cancer.
- Sir Apenera Short, 95, Cook Islands politician, Queen's Representative (1990–2000).
- Pavel Stolbov, 81, Russian gymnast, 1956 Olympic gold medalist.

=== 16 ===
- Gerald Abramovitz, 82, South African architect and designer, assault-related injuries.
- Kirby Allan, 83, American record producer, house fire.
- James Allason, 98, British politician and soldier, MP for Hemel Hempstead (1959–1974).
- Claudia Bryar, 93, American actress (Psycho II, Pat Garrett and Billy the Kid, Bad Company).
- Wild Man Fischer, 66, American street musician, heart failure.
- Abrar Hussain, 46, Pakistani Olympic boxer, shot.
- Yehuda Kiel, 94, Israeli educator and biblical scholar.
- Östen Mäkitalo, 72, Swedish electrical engineer.
- Dorice Reid, 67, Cook Islander tourism official and businesswoman, High Commissioner designate to New Zealand.
- Twins Seven Seven, 67, Nigerian artist, complications of a stroke.

=== 17 ===
- Colin Aamodt, 89, Australian football player.
- Björn-Olof Alholm, 86, Finnish ambassador.
- Richard Bennett, 79, Trinidadian Olympic sailor.
- Kjell Bohlin, 82, Norwegian politician.
- David Brockhoff, 83, Australian rugby union player and coach.
- Jacquie de Creed, 54, British stuntwoman, air crash.
- Betty Fox, 73, Canadian cancer research activist, founder of the Terry Fox Foundation.
- Ben Grussendorf, 69, American politician, Speaker of the Alaska House of Representatives (1985–1989; 1991–1993).
- E. Philip Howrey, 73, American economist, bicycle accident.
- Ruth M. Kirk, 81, American politician, Maryland House of Delegates (1983–2011).
- Rex Mossop, 83, Australian rugby player and television commentator.
- Fritz Semmelmann, 82, German footballer.
- Nathan Sharon, 86, Israeli biochemist.
- George Malcolm White, 90, American architect, Architect of the Capitol (1971–1995), complications of Parkinson's disease.

=== 18 ===
- Echendu Adiele, 32, Nigerian footballer.
- Alan Bamford, 80, British academic.
- Ulrich Biesinger, 77, German football player.
- Yelena Bonner, 88, Russian human rights activist, long illness.
- Cheryl B, 38, American poet and performance artist.
- Frederick Chiluba, 68, Zambian politician, President (1991–2002), heart attack.
- Clarence Clemons, 69, American saxophonist (E Street Band) and singer ("You're a Friend Of Mine"), complications following a stroke.
- A. Whitney Ellsworth, 75, American editor and publisher (The New York Review of Books), pancreatic cancer.
- Karl Frei, 94, Swiss gymnast, 1948 Olympic gold medalist .
- Brian Haw, 62, British peace activist, lung cancer.
- Gustaf Kjellvander, 31, Swedish singer-songwriter.
- Benedek Litkey, 69, Hungarian Olympic sailor.
- Robin Nash, 84, British television producer.
- Bob Pease, 70, American integrated circuit engineer.
- John Perumattam, 89, Indian Syro-Malabar Catholic hierarch, Bishop of Ujjain (1968–1998).
- Shlomo Pinto, 57, Israeli Paralympic athlete.
- Lew Sayre Schwartz, 84, American comic book artist (Batman), co-creator of Deadshot.

=== 19 ===
- Don Diamond, 90, American actor (F Troop, The Adventures of Kit Carson, Zorro).
- Tom Hungerford, 96, Australian author.
- Rezső Kende, 102, Hungarian Olympic gymnast.
- John Kerr, 67, Scottish-born Canadian soccer player.
- Fernand Linssen, 82, Belgian Olympic sprinter.
- Fyodor Reshetnikov, 91, Russian physicist, chemist, and metallurgist, academician of RAS.

=== 20 ===
- Alexander Abrosimov, 62, Russian mathematician and teacher.
- Zar Ajam, 17, Pakistani mass murderer and terrorist, execution by hanging.
- Thomas N. Armstrong III, 78, American museum curator.
- Ryan Dunn, 34, American reality television star (Jackass, Viva La Bam, CKY), car crash.
- Safa Giray, 80, Turkish civil engineer and politician, 3-time minister.
- Magomet Isayev, 83, Russian Esperantist, translator and linguist.
- Domnitsa Lanitou-Kavounidou, 97, Greek Olympic sprinter.
- Ottilie Patterson, 79, Northern Irish singer.
- Vladimir Pettay, 38, Russian football referee, plane crash.
- Eric Swenson, 64, American businessman, co-founder of Thrasher, suicide by gunshot.
- Robert H. Widmer, 95, American aeronautical engineer.

=== 21 ===
- E. M. Broner, 83, American author, multiple organ failure.
- Arthur Budgett, 95, British racehorse trainer.
- Mark Gerard, 76, American racehorse trainer.
- Anthony Herrera, 67, American actor (As the World Turns, Loving, Extreme Justice), cancer.
- Kothapalli Jayashankar, 76, Indian educator and politician, after long illness.
- Bruce Kinloch, 91, British soldier and game warden.
- Robert Kroetsch, 83, Canadian novelist and poet, car crash.
- Lucifer, 50, American wrestler.
- Alena Reichová, 77, Czech Olympic gymnast.
- Suresh Tendulkar, 72, Indian economist, cardiac arrest.

=== 22 ===
- Sir John Agnew, 6th Baronet, 60, British landowner, prostate cancer.
- Kader Asmal, 76, South African politician, heart attack.
- Guy Coulombe, 75, Canadian civil servant, lung cancer.
- Fanny de Sivers, 90, Estonian linguist and translator.
- Carmelo Giaquinta, 81, Argentinian Roman Catholic prelate, Archbishop of Resistencia (1993–2005).
- Harley Hotchkiss, 83, Canadian businessman, member of Hockey Hall of Fame, prostate cancer.
- Albert Johnson, 90, English footballer (Everton), Alzheimer's disease.
- Robert Miller, 72, American art dealer, infection.
- Sir Stephen Olver, 95, British diplomat, High Commissioner to Sierra Leone (1969–1972) and Cyprus (1973–1975)
- Cyril Ornadel, 87, British conductor and composer.
- Coşkun Özarı, 80, Turkish footballer and coach.
- David Rayfiel, 87, American screenwriter (Out of Africa, Three Days of the Condor), heart failure.
- Nataša Urbančič, 65, Slovene athlete.
- Ken Vaughan, 76, Australian politician, member of the Legislative Assembly of Queensland (1979–1995).
- Mike Waterson, 70, British folk singer, cancer.
- John Waite, 81, South African cricketer.
- Zbyněk Zeman, 82, Czech historian.

=== 23 ===
- Vladislav Achalov, 65, Russian general and activist.
- J. Warren Bettis, 86, American jurist.
- Gene Colan, 84, American comic book artist (Daredevil, Blade, Howard the Duck), complications from liver disease and a broken hip.
- Gaye Delorme, 64, Canadian musician, heart attack.
- Peter Falk, 83, American actor (Columbo, Pocketful of Miracles, The Princess Bride).
- Stéphane Franke, 47, German athlete.
- Len King, 86, Australian politician and jurist, Chief Justice of the Supreme Court of South Australia (1978–1995).
- Dennis Marshall, 25, Costa Rican footballer, car crash.
- Patricia Merbreier, 86, American actress and television personality (Captain Noah and His Magical Ark).
- Basil Mitchell, 94, British philosopher.
- Christiane Desroches Noblecourt, 97, French Egyptologist.
- Arthur Motyer, 85, Canadian educator and writer.
- Attilio Ruffini, 85, Italian politician, Minister of Defence (1977–1980) and Minister of Foreign Affairs (1980).
- Abul Ainain Shuaisha, 88, Egyptian Quran reciter.
- Fred Steiner, 88, American television composer (Perry Mason, Star Trek, The Twilight Zone).

=== 24 ===
- Michelle Brunner, 57, British bridge player, writer and teacher, breast cancer.
- Tomislav Ivić, 77, Croatian football coach (Ajax).
- Richie Myers, 81, American baseball player (Chicago Cubs), complications from a fall.
- F. Gilman Spencer, 85, American Pulitzer Prize-winning newspaper editor.
- Richard Webster, 60, British historian and writer, heart failure.
- A. H. Woodfull, 98, British product designer.

=== 25 ===
- Dorothea Austin, 89, Austrian-born American pianist and composer.
- George Ballas, 85, American entrepreneur, inventor of the Weed Eater.
- Nick Charles, 64, American sportscaster (CNN Sports Tonight), bladder cancer.
- Anne Field, 85, British army officer.
- Shelby Grant, 74, American actress (Our Man Flint, Fantastic Voyage, Medical Center), brain aneurysm.
- Martin H. Greenberg, 70, American anthologist, cancer.
- Jean Harris, 66, American politician and LGBT activist.
- Jan Kułakowski, 80, Polish politician, Member of the European Parliament (2004–2009).
- Viktor Mikhaylov, 77, Russian nuclear scientist.
- J. O. Patterson Jr., 76, American politician and religious leader, first black mayor of Memphis (1982).
- Alice Playten, 63, American actress (Henry, Sweet Henry), heart failure.
- Goff Richards, 66, English brass band arranger and composer, illness.
- Betty Roberts, 88, American politician and jurist, Oregon Supreme Court (1982–1986), pulmonary fibrosis.
- Paulo Renato Souza, 65, Brazilian politician, Minister of Education (1995–2002), heart attack.
- Margaret Tyzack, 79, British actress (The First Churchills, 2001: A Space Odyssey, Match Point).

=== 26 ===
- James Craig Anderson, 47, American murder victim, beaten and ran over.
- Jeanne Edwards, 82, American politician, member of the Washington House of Representatives (1999–2005).
- Adalberto Escobar, 62, Paraguayan footballer
- Edith Fellows, 88, American actress, natural causes.
- Jung Jung-suk, 28, South Korean footballer, stomach cancer.
- Norma Lyon, 81, American farmer and butter sculpture artist.
- Robert Morris, 78, American cryptographer, complications of dementia.
- Sidney Hollis Radner, 91, American collector of Harry Houdini memorabilia.
- Alan Rodger, Baron Rodger of Earlsferry, 66, British jurist, Supreme Court judge.
- Christopher Shale, 56, British political aide.
- Jan van Beveren, 63, Dutch footballer and coach.
- Barry Wilkins, 64, Canadian hockey player (Vancouver Canucks, Boston Bruins), lung cancer.

=== 27 ===
- William L. Adams, 97, American businessman.
- Stuart Appelle, 65, American professor and writer.
- Ken Bainbridge, 90, English footballer (West Ham). (death reported on this date)
- Betty Callaway, 83, British ice skating trainer (Torvill and Dean).
- Lorenzo Charles, 47, American basketball player (NC State, Atlanta Hawks), bus accident.
- Mike Doyle, 64, English footballer (Manchester City), liver failure.
- Owen Drake, 75, American politician, member of the Alabama House of Representatives, cancer.
- Orvin B. Fjare, 93, American politician, U.S. Representative from Montana (1955–1957).
- Cassandra Hodges, 28, American voice actress.
- Michel Yehuda Lefkowitz, 97, Israeli rabbi.
- Thierry Martens, 69, Belgian science fiction, detective novels, and comics author.
- Erling Olsen, 84, Danish politician, natural causes.
- Richard H. Poff, 87, American jurist and politician, U.S. Representative from Virginia (1953–1972).
- Lura Lynn Ryan, 76, American First Lady of Illinois (1999–2003), cancer.
- Elmer Sexauer, 85, American baseball player (Brooklyn Dodgers), cardiac arrest.
- Elaine Stewart, 81, American actress and model, after long illness.
- Charles W. Whalen Jr., 90, American politician, U.S. Representative from Ohio (1967–1979).
- Maciej Zembaty, 67, Polish writer and singer.

=== 28 ===
- Olav Askvik, 96, Norwegian politician.
- Paul Baghdadlian, 57, Armenian-American singer-songwriter and businessman, lung cancer.
- Billy Baldwin, 63, American baseball player (Detroit Tigers, New York Mets).
- Giorgio Bernardin, 83, Italian footballer.
- Benton Flippen, 90, American fiddler, heart attack.
- Howard Fox, 90, American baseball executive.
- Richard Fox, 57, Irish-born British jockey and actor.
- Osamu Kobayashi, 76, Japanese voice actor and executive director, pancreatic cancer.
- Newt Loken, 92, American gymnastics coach (University of Michigan).
- Ants Paju, 66, Estonian athlete, journalist and politician.
- Angélico Vieira, 28, Portuguese actor (Morangos com Açúcar) and singer (D'ZRT), car accident.
- Michael Wenning, 75, South African-born American minister, leukemia and kidney failure.

=== 29 ===
- R. C. Alston, 78, English bibliographer.
- Barbatana, 82, Brazilian football coach and player, Alzheimer's disease.
- Billy Beck, 86, American actor and clown.
- Larry Bogdanow, 64, American architect, brain tumor.
- Billy Costello, 55, American former WBC world light welterweight champion boxer, lung cancer.
- Carlos Diarte, 57, Paraguayan footballer, cancer.
- David Dunseith, 76, British broadcaster (BBC Radio Ulster).
- Stefano Gobbi, 81, Italian Roman Catholic priest, founder of the Marian Movement of Priests.
- Kaya Köstepen, 76, Turkish footballer.
- Domenico Pecile, 88, Italian Roman Catholic prelate, Bishop of Latina-Terracina-Sezze-Priverno (1983–1998).
- K. D. Sethna, 106, Indian scholar and writer.

=== 30 ===
- James Murray Beck, 96, Canadian historian.
- David G. Boschert, 63, American politician, member of the Maryland House of Delegates (1999–2007), cancer.
- Barry Bremen, 64, American marketing executive and sports imposter, cancer.
- Don Buddin, 77, American baseball player (Boston Red Sox, Houston Colt .45s, Detroit Tigers).
- Preston Carpenter, 77, American football player (Cleveland Browns, Pittsburgh Steelers, Washington Redskins).
- Christy Essien-Igbokwe, 50, Nigerian musician.
- Dina Golan, 65, Israeli singer and actress, cancer.
- Tom Kruse, 96, Australian outback mailman and documentary subject (The Back of Beyond).
- Sir David Loram, 86, British admiral.
- Ruth Roberts, 84, American songwriter ("Meet the Mets"), lung cancer.
- Jimmy Roselli, 85, American singer, heart complications.
- Jay Dee Springbett, 36, British-born Australian record industry executive and Australian Idol judge.
- Georg Sterzinsky, 75, German Roman Catholic cardinal, Archbishop of Berlin (1989–2011), long illness.
- Sean Wight, 47, Scottish-born Australian football player, lung cancer.
