= Ignazio Vella =

American businessman and cheese maker

Ignazio A. "Ig" Vella

Sonoma County supervisor
- In office 1964–1975

Personal details
- Born: July 13, 1928 Sonoma, California
- Died: June 9, 2011 Sonoma, California
- Spouse: Sally (Wright) Vella
- Children: Ditty Vella, Chickie Vella, Thomas William Vella
- Education: Santa Clara University
- Profession: Cheese maker and businessman

Military service
- Branch/service: Air Force Reserve
- Rank: Second Lieutenant

Ignazio A. "Ig" Vella (July 13, 1928 – June 9, 2011) was an American businessman and cheese maker who served on the Sonoma County Board of Supervisors.

== Biography ==
Vella was born on July 13, 1928, to Gaetano "Tom" Vella and Zolita (Clerici) Vella of Sonoma, California.

He attended Sonoma Valley High School, the San Rafael Military Academy, and Air Force Officer Candidate School. In 1950, he graduated magna cum laude from Santa Clara University with a bachelor's degree in history. His father owned the Vella Cheese Company, Inc. in California and the Rogue Creamery in Oregon, which he turned over to his children. Vella took control of both companies and was their general manager and chief executive officer. He sold Rogue Creamery in 2002.

Vella served three terms (twelve years) on the Sonoma County Board of Supervisors, where he represented the First District. He was also on the Sonoma City Planning Commission and manager of the Sonoma County Fair. During the 1970s, he was president of the Association of Bay Area Governments.

In 2006, Vella was honored by the City of Sonoma, which named the West Napa Street bridge over Sonoma Creek after him. In the same year, the American Cheese Society recognized Vella with a Lifetime Achievement Award for contributions to artisan cheese.

After a prolonged illness, Vella died at his home in Sonoma, aged 83.

== See also ==
- List of cheesemakers
