= In sickness and in health (disambiguation) =

"In sickness and in health" is a common part of marriage vows.

In sickness and in health may also refer to:

- In Sickness and in Health, British television sitcom
- "In Sickness and in Health" (Fear Itself), 2008 TV episode
- In Sickness & In Health, 1986 album by Demented Are Go
