= Mad at You (disambiguation) =

Mad at You most commonly refers to:

- "Mad at You", a 1980 song by English musician Joe Jackson

Mad at You may also refer to:

== Other songs ==
- "Mad at You", by 3OH!3 from Night Sports, 2016
- "Mad at You", by Drax Project from Diamond, 2022
- "Mad at You", by Jetty Rae from Blackberries, 2008
- "Mad at You", by King Von featuring Dreezy from Welcome to O'Block, 2020
- "Mad at You", by Noah Cyrus featuring Gallant from Good Cry, 2018
- "Mad at You", by Mack Self, 1959
- "Mad at You", by Navvy, co-written and produced by Sam de Jong, 2019
- "Mad at You", by Why Don't We, 2019
