= Hellbilly Storm =

Studio album by Demented Are Go
- Released: 2005
- Genre: Psychobilly
- Label: People Like You Records

Demented Are Go chronology
Hellucifernation (1999)	Hellbilly Storm (2005)

Hellbilly Storm is the seventh full-length studio album by the Welsh psychobilly band Demented Are Go.

== Critical reception ==
Professional ratings
Review scores
Source	Rating
Metalfan.nl	79/100
Ox-Fanzine	8/10
Rough Edge	2.5/4

== Track listing ==
1. "Pedigree Scum"
2. "The Noose that Snapped"
3. "Hellbilly Storm"
4. "Skating in the Rain"
5. "Out of Control"
6. "Block Up"
7. "Hotrod Vampires"
8. "Destruction Boy"
9. "Doin' Me In"
10. "Demon Seed"
11. "Jogging Machine"
12. "Someone's Out to Get Me"*
13. "When Death Rides a Horse"**

== Personnel ==
- Mark "Sparky" Phillips - vocals
- Stan - guitar
- Lex Luther - lead guitar
- Doyley - guitar
- Strangy - upright bass & electric bass
- Criss Damage - drums
- Charlie Harper - harp
- Country Woman - mandolin & 12 string acoustic guitar*
- The Deadbillys**
