= In Sickness & In Health =

Studio album by Demented Are Go
- Released: 1986
- Genre: Psychobilly
- Label: ID Records
- Producer: Pete Gage

Demented Are Go chronology
Holy Hack Jack (1986)	In Sickness & In Health (1986)	Kicked Out of Hell (1988)

Professional ratings
Review scores
Source	Rating
AllMusic	4/5 stars

In Sickness & In Health is the debut album of Welsh psychobilly band Demented Are Go. It was originally released in 1986 on ID Records. The band did two interpretations of early rock 'n' roll songs plus a cover-version of The Osmonds song "Crazy Horses". The two rock 'n' roll songs featured on the album were Gene Vincent's "Be-Bop-A-Lula" and Mack Self's "Vibrate".

== Track listing ==
1. "Be Bop A Lula"
2. "Pervy in the Park"
3. "(I Was Born on a) Busted Hymen"
4. "Holy Hack Jack"
5. "Frenzied Beat"
6. "Pickled and Preserved"
7. "Crazy Horses"
8. "Transvestite Blues"
9. "Rubber Buccaneer"
10. "Vibrate"
11. "Rubber Love"
12. "Nuke Mutants"
13. "Pvc Chair"
14. "Don't Go in the Woods"

== Personnel ==
- Sparky (Mark Phillips) - Vocals, Winger-Wanger
- Ant Thomas - Drums
- Dick - Lead Guitar, Electric Bass, Vocals
- Ray Thompson -Double Bass
- Simon Cohen -Fiddle
- Simon Crowfoot -Double Bass on Rubber Love

== Production ==
- Producer: Pete Gage
- Engineers: Malcolm, Pete Gage
- Mastering:
- CD Mastering:
- Photography: Tim Wilkins
