= Claudio Cavazza =

Italian businessman (1934–2011)

Claudio Cavazza (4 May 1934, Bologna - 6 June 2011, Rome, Lazio) was an Italian entrepreneur, Chairman and founder of the Sigma-Tau pharmaceutical company.

== History ==
Instigator and promoter of the scientific section of the Festival dei Due Mondi (Festival of the Two Worlds) in Spoleto, SpoletoScienza, organized by the Fondazione Sigma-Tau, which quickly established itself as one of the most important events dedicated to matters of science and epistemology of our times. After having graduated with a degree in pharmaceutical chemistry and studied for some time under Professor Noris Siliprandi, Professor of Biochemistry at the University of Padua, Cavazza soon made the decision to dedicate himself to entrepreneurial activities. His entrepreneurial breakthrough into the pharmaceutical sector happened in the mid 1960s, thanks to the launch of Rekord B12, which soon became one of the highest selling medicines in Italy and elsewhere. Its success originated from the discovery that vitamin B12 develops an antiasthenic and antidepressant effect at high doses. The medicine was also distinctively packaged in a particularly innovatively designed tube, which was exhibited at the Museum of Modern Art in New York City. An equally fundamental step in the history of Sigma-Tau group was the decision – resulting from the passion and determination of Claudio Cavazza – to dedicate significant resources to scientific research into the study of carnitine, an endogenous substance of natural origin that is without side effects, which intervenes in the processes that allow cells to produce their own energy sources. The study of carnitine produced preparations of proven efficiency, able to correct metabolic defects, whether congenital or acquired, in different clinical situations. Over the years, Sigma-Tau group has broadened its presence in the international scene with branches not only in the major European countries of France, Switzerland, the Netherlands, Belgium, Portugal, Germany, and the United Kingdom, but also in India, and with two production plants in the United States and Spain. Sigma-Tau group has around 2,500 employees, 400 of whom are researchers involved in the most advanced sectors of national and worldwide research in which it reinvests 16% of its turnover.

== Roles ==
Claudio Cavazza was Chairman of Italian pharmaceutical industry association, Farmindustria, from 1986 to 1992. He was a member of the presiding committee of the Italian employers’ federation, Confindustria, subsequently invited to join Confindustria’s technical education committee and the steering committee formed by the Confindustria Health Commission. In January 2008, Cavazza was made manager of the industrial innovation project “Nuove Tecnologie della Vita” (New life science technologies) within the Italian Ministry of Economic Development. He was a member of the board of EFPIA (European Federation of Pharmaceutical Industries and Associations), of which he was vice president from 1992 to 1994. He was also member of the Council of IFPMA (International Federation of Pharmaceutical Manufacturers Association).

== Recognition ==
Cavazza was appointed to the order of Knight of Labour in 1987. In 2005, the University of Genoa awarded him an honorary degree in Medicine. He was awarded an honorary degree in International Business Strategies from LUSTICO, the Free International University for International Studies of Ostia. In recognition of his commitment to research and development activities for rare diseases in the United States, in 1995 the county of Maryland established the Claudio Cavazza Science Award. In June 2005 he was awarded the Pharma-Finance award for biotechnologies, and in December 2009 was given the title of meritorious member of the non-profit Italian association for fragile X syndrome (Associazione Italiana Sindrome X Fragile Onlus) for the commitment he has shown towards those affected by the syndrome.

== Commitment to culture ==
In 1986 Claudio Cavazza instigated the creation of the Fondazione Sigma-Tau, intended to introduce the concepts of entirety and complexity of the humanities into entrepreneurial planning and medicine, in order to promote academic and cultural debate and encourage scientific progress. Cavazza founded the Sigma-Tau publishing house in 1988, producing the scientific magazine Sfera, an editorial project of 43 parts published between 1988 and 1995. Through its innovation it gained two awards, the Galileo in Italy in 1989, and the Prix Caméra in Paris in 1991.

== Involvement in activities in the public interest ==
Cavazza took part in numerous CNR (Consiglio Nazionale delle Ricerche – Italian National Research Council) consulting committees:

- National Committee for Chemical Sciences
- Scientific committee for the Preventive and Rehabilitative Medicine Project
- Scientific committee for the project on ageing
- Commission of the Target Project Biotechnology and Bioinstrumentation.

For the Italian Ministry of Research he has also participated in:

- National Drug Committee
- National Committee for Biology

He was vice president of the committee of Aspen Institute Italia, an institute that promotes collaboration and research at international level on the policies of development in large global areas.

== Sources ==
- G. Rossi, B. Chiavazzo, Capitani coraggiosi, Memori, 2005.
- AAVV, SpoletoScienza, n°32, anno XVIII, 2006.
- AAVV, SpoletoScienza, n°36, anno XX, 2008.
- AAVV, SpoletoScienza, n°37, anno XXI, 2009.
- AAVV, SpoletoScienza, n°38, anno XXI, 2009.
- AAVV, SpoletoScienza, n°39, anno XXII, 2010.
- AAVV, SpoletoScienza, n°41, anno XXII, 2011.
