= Demented Are Go =

Welsh psychobilly band

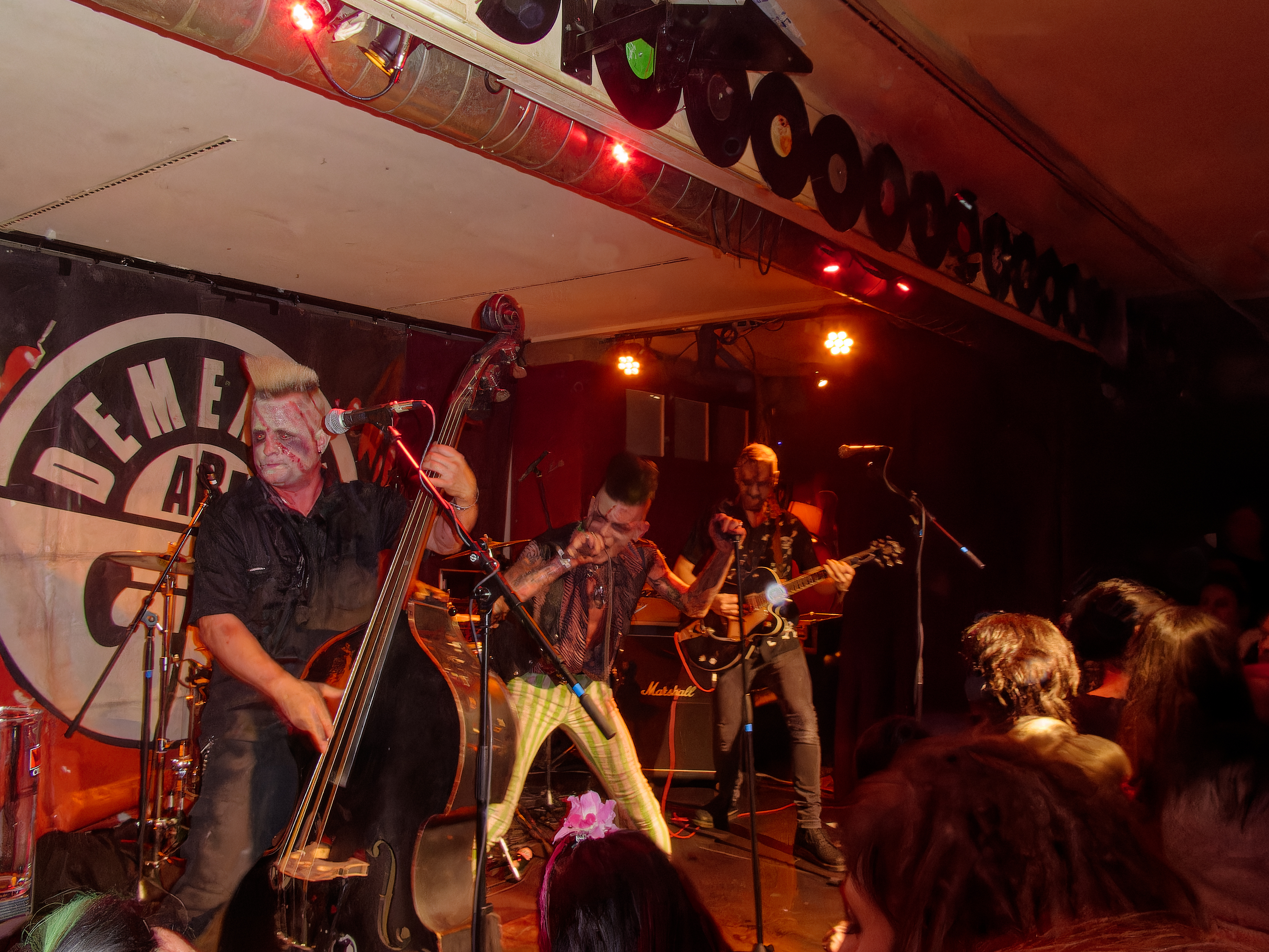
- Live at Goldmark's in Stuttgart, Germany, 2017

Background information
- Origin: Cardiff, Wales
- Genres: Psychobilly, punk rock
- Years active: 1982–1995, 1996–present
- Labels: Crazy Love Records, People Like You (Germany), Link Records, ID Records
- Members: Mark "Sparky" Phillips (vocals); Holger Dag (guitar); Grischa (bass); Gaybeul Gualdi (drums)
- Past members: Gavin Evans; Dick Thomas "Lex" Luthor Taylor; Mike Pannell; Stan Standen; Philip Doyle; Tony Biggs; Ray Thompson; Graeme Grant; Billy Favata; Paul "Choppy" Lambourne; Kelvin Klump; Tony "Strangy" Gilmore 'Rockin' Rick Tanner; Ant "The Horse Man" Thomas; Criss Damage; Ed Fleming; Teo Demkiv Ferlin (under Festering Sores)
- Website: http://www.dementedarego.de/

Demented Are Go (DAG aka Demented Are Go!) are a Welsh psychobilly band that was formed around 1982 near Cardiff, Wales. They were one of the earliest in the initial wave of bands to mix punk rock with rockabilly, and as a result, are considered to be highly influential to the psychobilly scene. The band often claims their name originated from the phrase "Demon teds are go!" as an adaptation of the phrase "Thunderbirds are go!" from the Thunderbirds TV series. Psychobilly is often associated with horror.

== Career ==
=== Formation ===
Demented Are Go formed in Penarth, South Wales, near Cardiff. Initially, the band was disorganized, with Mark Phillips or "Sparky" playing drums, Ant Thomas singing, Richard Jones playing bass, and Steve Jordan, playing rhythm guitar with a gold-top Les Paul. The band's image was represented by Jones' red dyed hair and Jordan's leather trousers. Dick Thomas, a veteran musician of the punk-pub rock circuits, joined the band in early 1983 and proceeded to reshuffle the line-up (Thomas moved to drums and Phillips sang vocals), taught the bass player how to play his instrument, and, otherwise, consolidated the overall band.

=== Early recordings ===
After six weeks of rehearsals, the band's first gig was third on the bill to a line-up of Crass-type anarchist bands at the Sea Lion in Penarth and was met with good reception. Several years of playing everything from working men's clubs in the Rhondda to the red-light district in Hamburg, turning up at the Klub Foot twenty minutes after they were due on stage.

They recorded two songs for their first release on a 1984 compilation, Hell's Bent on Rockin' from Nervous Records, a well-known record label in the psychobilly scene. At this point Jones and Jordan Had been replaced by Gavin Evans on guitar and Ed Fleming on bass. These tracks were engineered and co-produced by Paul "Doc" Stewart at Village Way Recording. Evans and Fleming left in late 1984, the line-up then incorporated multi-instrumentalist Ray Thompson, who had been working with Dick on various side projects since 1983.

=== In Sickness & In Health ===
In 1986, they released their first album, In Sickness & In Health, on ID Records, which was recorded in less than 24 hours with 90% first takes, with Ray Thompson on bass. The core members at this time remained Mark, Ant and Dick.

The band moved to London in 1986 in an attempt to be closer to regular work. Ray's departure left a difficult hole to fill, which resulted in what became known as the "Month of a Thousand Bass Players", it was actually closer to a year, which involved getting ANYONE who knew how to play a Bass to fill the slot. Dick left in 1987, after continuing frustration with the direction which the band was taking. Undeterred, the then new double-bass player and songwriter, Graeme Grant, recruited Lex "Luther" (at Dick's last Klubfoot gig) to replace Dick, who incidentally coached Lex to bring him up to speed with the band's material. In 1988, this was followed with the second full-length album, Kicked Out of Hell that reached high positions in the "indie" charts, in both the United Kingdom (UK) and abroad.

The band began extensively touring Europe and gained both a psychobilly and punk rock following. At this point, the lead singer, Phillips, started frequently using psychoactive drugs, such as LSD (lysergic acid diethylamide), and alcohol. Graeme and Luthor both left the band at the end of 1989, with the latter rejoining the band shortly after. Billy Favata replaced Graeme on double bass, but later moved to America while Graeme would eventually return to bass duties in 1992.

=== The Day the Earth Spat Blood ===
In 1989, the band was back in the studio with a new line-up. Joining Sparky and stalwart drummer Ant, were Mike Pannell on guitar, Billy Favata on double bass and Simon Cohen on fiddle. When the sound engineer asked, "Can I hear your first song?" he was greeted with the reply, "Ok. We're just going to write it." The result – written, recorded and mixed in three days – was the EP The Day the Earth Spat Blood (Link Records).[1] The album has since become something of an underground classic with Cohen's cover artwork being used by footwear brand Dr. Martens to adorn a range of boots in 2016 – some twenty-seven years after the album was first released. The album was a departure from Demented's first two psychobilly albums and fused elements of rockabilly, hard rock, bluegrass and experimentation. Consequently, the group released the album under the title 'Demented Are Go presents – The Demon Teds.' The volatile line-up performed around Britain and played dates in Holland and Germany. Pannell left in 1990, going on to play with Something Shocking (Fury Records), Rose Tinted Spectacles, Soulteros and the Royal Scumbag Orchestra (Heroe de la Guitarra Records).

=== Orgasmic Nightmare ===
The group too then signed to psychobilly label Fury Records in 1991, writing and recording their next full-length album Orgasmic Nightmare, which contained input from their former bassist. Demented would tour almost constantly for the next two years.

=== Tangenital Madness on a Pleasant Side of Hell ===
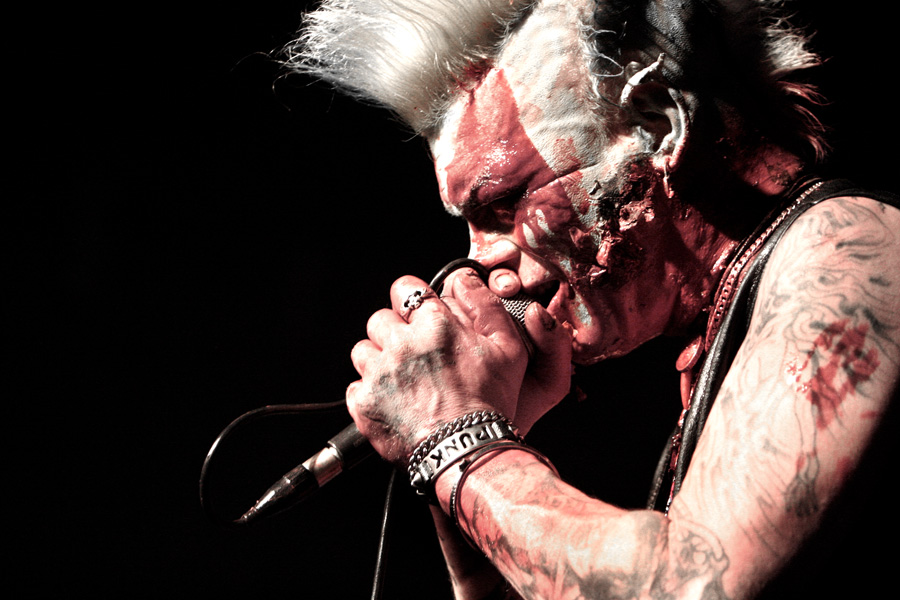
Demented Are Go's singer's makeup shows the band's horror-film aesthetic.

A second album for Fury Records, Tangenital Madness on a Pleasant Side of Hell, was recorded in 1993, followed by two tours in Japan. The band was infamous for Sparky showing up to Japanese performances naked and doing strange things with a rubber fish. During a tour in Germany in spring 1995, the band broke up due to Sparky's deteriorating mental state.

=== Reformation – I Wanna See You Bleed! ===
In 1996, Demented Are Go re-formed to release the EP I Wanna See You Bleed! for Hell Razor Records (this would be Graeme's last recording with the band). The band then toured the west coast of the United States|U.S. in 1997. They would again be known more for their wild stage show, which included on-stage sex with a vacuum cleaner. At the end of 1997, Graeme Grant left the band, due to other commitments, but before leaving, he recruited Stan Standen on guitar to replace Lex.

=== Hellucifernation ===
The band released the full-length album, Hellucifernation, on Crazy Love Records in 1999. However, a European tour for the record's release was cancelled due to the re-emergence of Phillips' mental health issues. The band considered breaking up, but were offered a headline gig in New Jersey, United States (US), and decided to give Phillips a second try. Upon arrival in the US, Phillips first caused trouble at a hotel by cross-dressing and partaking in illicit drug use; he then set fire to a surrounding woodland at the music venue. After the band's soundcheck, the members visited a nearby shopping mall, where Phillips pinched a young girl's behind; as she was 16 years old, Phillips was consequently arrested, in a silver dress and purple boots, and charged with molesting a minor. Unable to pay the USD$60,000 bail amount, the rest of the band returned to England, leaving Phillips in custody in the US.

=== Hellbilly Storm ===
After serving a month in prison and payment of a US$100 fine, Phillips returned to England. Lex Luther re-joined the band, along with drummer Criss Damage and Paul "Choppy" Lambourne on double bass. The band played two US tours, recorded a live album (with Kelvin Klump replacing Lambourne on double bass), ...Live at the Galaxy, on Crazy Love Records, and appeared at numerous European festivals.

In May 2002, Demented Are Go! performed at the first Wreckers Ball festival in Southern California. Following the festival, Demented Are Go! went on a two-week tour with The Kings of Nuthin', booked by psychobilly label Hairball 8 Records to promote the Kicked Outta Purgatory compilation. During the summer of 2003, Phillips was arrested numerous times on tour, resulting in further line-up changes. The band continued touring, including a successful Japanese tour and another tour of the US; the US tour was led by Phillips, and included psychobilly scene stalwarts, Tony "Strangy" Gilmore (double bass) and Philip "Doyley" Doyle (guitar), until September 2005. Following the US tour, the band members separated again.

During a month-long break, a new album, Hellbilly Storm, was released on German label, People Like You Records. The line-up on this recording was Phillips, Strangy, Doyley, Criss Damage, Stan, Lex Luther, and special guests, Charlie Harper and Country Woman.

At the beginning of a 2006 US tour, Phillips was detained by US immigration authorities due to his criminal history; he was subsequently sent back to England. Following the cancellation of the US tour, Demented Are Go played shows in Europe.

In 2012 the album Welcome back to Insanity Hall was released, featuring the line-up of Phillips (vocals), Criss Damage (drums) with newcomers Holger Grothe Dag (guitar) and Grischa Dördelmann (double bass). In 2013, Criss Damage would be replaced on drums by Gaybeul Gualdi.

== Discography ==
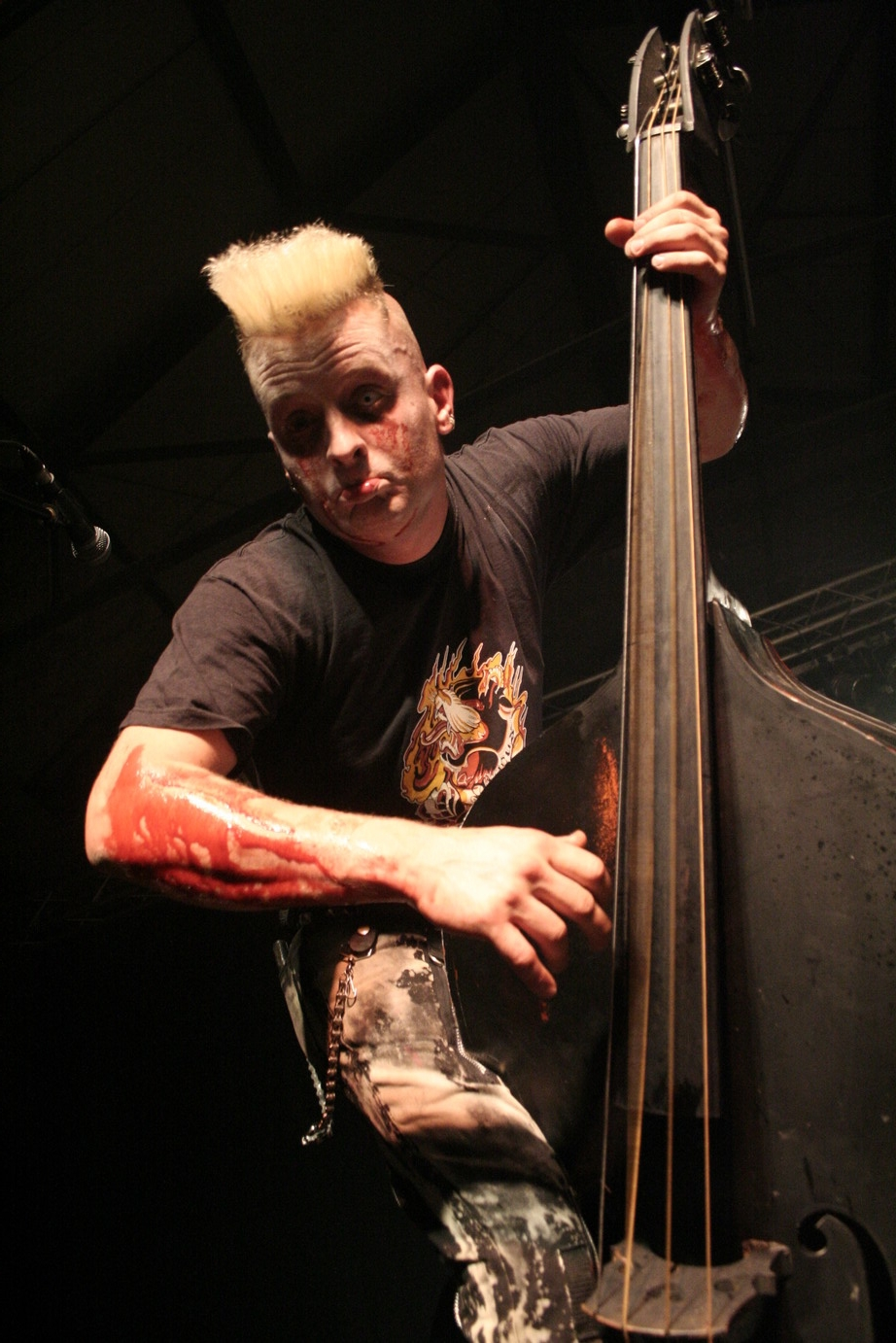
Grischa on upright bass, Dresden 2006

=== Studio albums ===
- In Sickness & In Health (ID Records – NOSE 9) – 1986
- Kicked Out of Hell (ID Records – NOSE 21) – 1988
- The Day the Earth Spat Blood (Link Records – LINK MLP 084) – 1989
- Orgasmic Nightmare (Fury Records – F3016) – 1991
- Tangenital Madness on a Pleasant Side of Hell (Fury Records – DAGLP1) – 1993
- Hellucifernation (Crazy Love Records) – 1999
- Hellbilly Storm (People Like You Records) – 2005
- Welcome back to Insanity Hall (People Like You Records) – 2012
- Psychotic Mutilation (Sunny Bastards Records) – 2025

=== Singles ===
- "Holy Hack Jack" (12" single) (ID Records – EYE T8) – 1986
- "Marijuana" (7" single) (Fury Records) – 1993
- "German Tour Single" (Limited edition 7" of 1000 copies) (Pin Up Records – Pin Up 95032) – 1995
- "I Wanna See You Bleed!!" (10" single) – Scandal Records 1996
- "Demons of the Swamp" (Limited edition 7" of 1000 copies) (Krueger Records – BZH666) – 1997
- "Daddy's Making Monsters" (7" single) (Crazy Love Records) – 1999
- "Hotrod Vampires" / "Out of Control" (7" single) (People Like U Records) – 2005
- "Lucky Charm" / "Another thing coming" (7" single) (People Like U Records) – 2012

=== Compilations ===
- The Best of Demented Are Go (Dojo Records) – 1993
- Satan's Rejects 1: The Very Best of Demented Are Go (Anagram Records) – 1997
- Satan's Rejects 2: The Very Best of Demented Are Go (Harry May Records) – 1999
- I Wanna See You Bleed!! (Remastered with live and demo tracks) (Hell Razer Records) – 2000

=== Live albums ===
- Sick Sick Sick (ID Records – NOSE 15) 1987
- Live and Rockin (Link Records – LINL LP 116) – 1990
- Go Go Demented (Link Records – LRMO 5) – 1990
- Live in Japan (Tombstone Records – TOMB-DISK 705/2) – 1993
- Who Put Grandma Under the Stairs (Receiver Records) – 1996
- Stomping at the Klubfoot (Mayo Records) – 2002
- Live at the Galaxy (Crazy Love Records) – 2003

== Band members ==
=== Current members ===
- Mark "Sparky" Phillips (vocals 1982–present)
- Holger Dag (guitar 2012–present)
- Grischa (double bass 2006–present)
- Gaybeul Gualdi (drums 2013–present)

=== Former members ===
- Gavin Evans (guitar 1984)
- Dick Thomas (guitar 1982–1986)
- "Lex" Luthor Taylor (guitar 1985–89, 1990–97, 1999–2005)
- Mike Pannell (guitar 1989–90)
- Stan Standen (guitar 1997–2000, 2002–2010)
- Philip Doyle (guitar, 2003–05)
- Tony Biggs (double bass 1985–86)
- Ray Thompson (bass 1986)
- Graeme Grant (double bass 1988,1993)
- Billy Favata (double bass 1989–91)
- Paul "Choppy" Lambourne (double bass)
- Kelvin Klump (double bass, 2003)
- Tony "Strangy" Gilmore (double bass, 2003–05)
- Rockin' Rick Tanner (double bass 2006)
- Ant Thomas (drums 1982–1999)
- Criss Damage (drums 2001–04, 2010–13)
