= Orgasmic Nightmare =

Studio album by Demented Are Go
- Released: 1991
- Genre: Psychobilly
- Label: Fury Records

Demented Are Go chronology
Kicked Out of Hell (1988)	Orgasmic Nightmare (1991)	Tangenital Madness on a Pleasant Side of Hell (1993)

Orgasmic Nightmare is the fourth full-length album released by the Welsh psychobilly band Demented Are Go.

== Track listing ==
The following tracks appear on the album.

1. "Orgasmic Nightmare"
2. "Beast in the Cellar"
3. "House of Blood"
4. "Now She's Dead"
5. "Clitoris Bite Boogie"
6. "Love Is Like Electrocution"
7. "Who Put Grandma Under the Stairs?"
8. "Love Seeps Like a Festering Sore"
9. "Nightlife"
10. "Anal Wonderland"
11. "Demon Angel"
12. "Straight Jacket"
13. "Rubber Rock"
14. "One Sharp Knife"
15. "Cast Iron Arm" (Live) *
16. "Marijuana" (Live) *
17. "Satan's Reject" (Live) *

'*' bonus tracks on CD

== Personnel ==
- Mark 'Sparky' Phillips - vocals
- Antanoid ´Horseman´ Thomas - drums
- Lex ´Luther Boy Wonder´ - Guitar
- Billy ´Space Cadet´ Munster - Slap bass

== Production ==
- Producer:
- Engineers:
- Mastering:
- CD Mastering: jfj
- Photography:
