= Christianity in Mauritania =

Christianity is a small minority religion in Mauritania (about 1%).

In 2020, the estimated Christian population amount was only 0.23% of the population. There are between 10,000 and 11,000 Christians in Mauritania in 2023, mostly foreign expatriates.

All of the roughly 6,000 Catholics in Mauritania are within the country's only diocese, the Diocese of Nouakchott. In 2026, there were 13 priests and around 30 nuns serving 5 parishes.

There are several expatriate African churches in Mauritania, though there are no more than 200 Protestants in the country, including foreigners.

In spite of a strict law against evangelism the Mauritanian Christian community has allegedly grown and there were estimated to be 400–1,000 ethnic Mauritanian Christians in 2010. For a short period of eight months the Miracle Channel, a Norwegian/Swedish Christian channel, broadcast clandestine Christian gatherings in the Mauritanian desert containing over 160 people.

On 7 April 2025, a mob protested against the existence of Mauritanian Christians in Sélibaby. They also desecrated the grave of a Mauritanian convert from Islam to Christianity, and exhumed his body.

== Issues ==
The distribution of Christian literature and the evangelizing of non-Muslims are prohibited by law. Bibles are rarely printed or distributed and are difficult to bring into the country.

In 2023, the country was ranked as the 20th worst place in the world to be a Christian by Open Doors.

== See also ==
- Religion in Mauritania
- Status of religious freedom in Mauritania

== Sources ==
- US State Dept 2006 report (archived)
