= Sonoma Cheese Factory =

Coordinates: 38.29387°N 122.45756°W

- Type: Private
- Industry: Cheese; Wine; Speciality foods; Dining
- Founded: 1931 in Sonoma, California, United States
- Founder: Celso Viviani
- Headquarters: Sonoma, California, United States
- Products: Cheese
- Revenue: $4 million (2005)
- Number of employees: 14 (2005)
- Parent: Sonoma's Best Hospitality Group
- Website: sonomacheesefactory.com

The Sonoma Cheese Factory is a cheese producer and specialty food store with a wine shop and café in Sonoma, California in the United States.

== History ==
=== Early history (1835-1944) ===
The Sonoma Cheese Factory is located on the former site of the home of Mariano Guadalupe Vallejo, Casa Grande, which was built in 1835. The home burned down in 1867. Between 1888 and 1941, the property housed a blacksmith shop, a wagon shop, and a feed mill. By 1944, the buildings were demolished.

=== From Prohibition to cheesemaking (1931-1945) ===
Born in Stazzema, Italy in 1886, when Celso Viviani was 24 years old he moved from Italy to Sonoma, California, where his brother lived. Viviani worked at a local quarry and managed a distillery at Sebastiani Vineyards. When Prohibition began, the Sebastiani Vineyards stopped producing wine and Viviani started to make cheese at the now defunct Sonoma Mission Creamery. The Sonoma Mission Creamery was founded by Joseph Vella and John Iacono in 1915. While learning to make cheese, Viviani met Joseph Vella's younger brother, Gaetano "Tom" Vella. The two men became friends and decided, after their training was complete, to start their own creamery: Sonoma Valley Creamery in 1931.

Sonoma Valley Creamery became one of the first companies in Sonoma Valley to only make cheese. The Creamery was located at a former pre-prohibition brewery in downtown Sonoma. Eventually, the name changed from Sonoma Valley Creamery to Sonoma Valley Cheese Factory and finally, the current incarnation: Sonoma Cheese Factory. In its inaugural year, the Factory had $58,000 in sales.

The Factory started making hard cheese of the Italian variety. They also produced cottage cheese and cream cheese. Viviani and Vella expanded production, purchasing a production plant in nearby Marin County and one in the state of Oregon. They decided to open a new headquarters in downtown Sonoma in 1944.

=== Post-war era (1945-1955) ===
Construction of the Sonoma Cheese Factory started in 1944 and was completed by 1945. The building included areas for retail sales, offices and cheese production. The building was designed by Pietro G. Canali, an Italian-American architect.

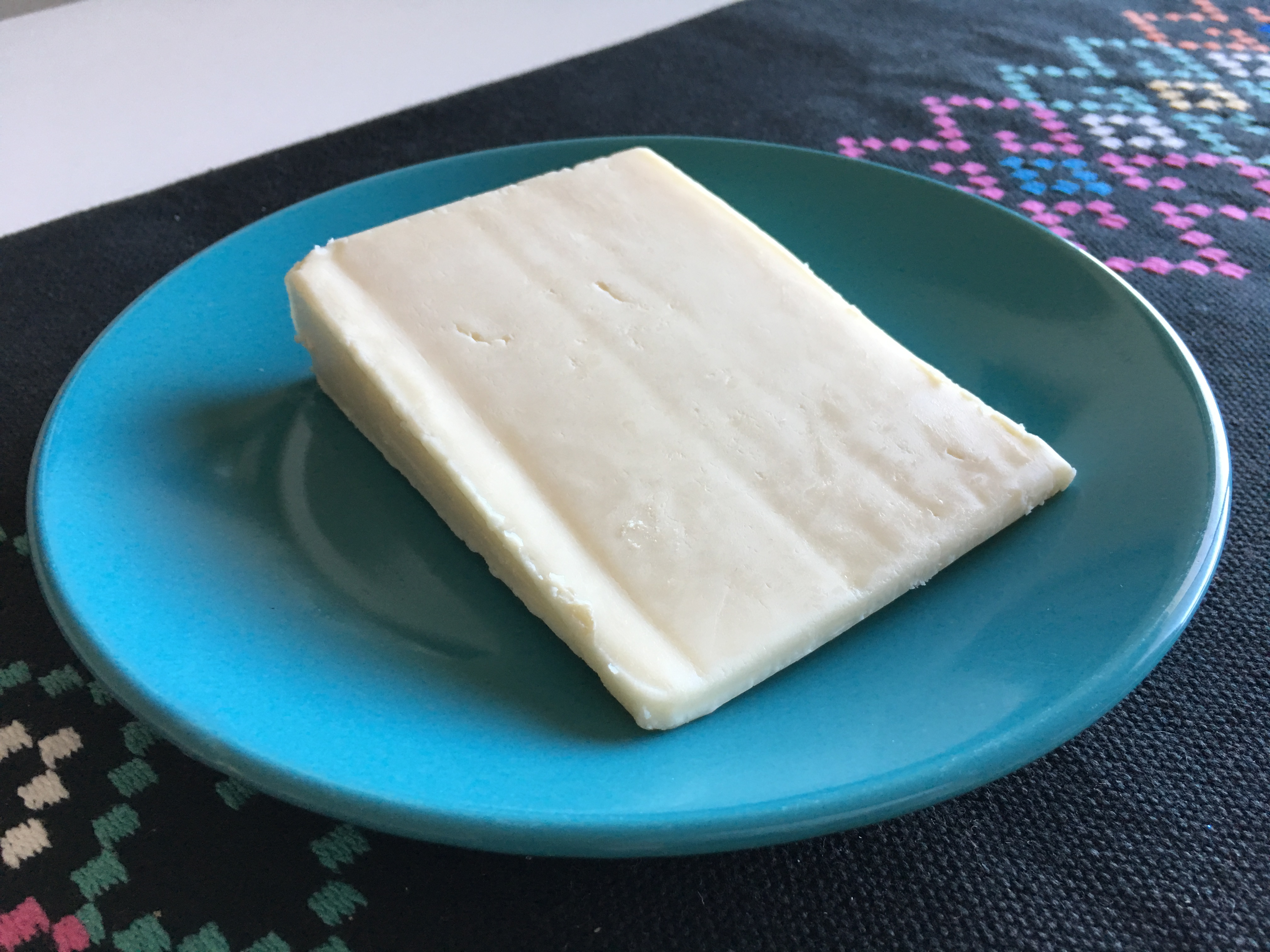
Sonoma Cheese Factory's flagship cheese: Sonoma Jack

As the company prepared to open the new facility, Viviani and Vella decided to go their separate ways professionally, with Viviani opening the new facility and Vella eventually founding the Vella Cheese Company at the old Sonoma Valley Creamery building. In August 2026, the Vella family announced that the company would cease operations after 96 years.

During the mid to late 1940s, Sonoma Cheese Factory sold cottage cheese and cream cheese to the Kraft Foods. Eventually, the lack of easy access to fresh milk, due to dairy farm industrialization, caused the Viviani's to focus strictly on semi-hard cheese. It was during this time when they created Sonoma Jack, their most famous cheese.

Celso Viviani died in 1955 and his son, Pete Viviani oversaw full operations.

=== Late 20th-century (1960-1981) ===
The Sonoma Cheese Factory struggled in the 1960s due to supply chain challenges regarding dairy production, which almost caused the company to close. Towards the end of the 1960s, Pete Viviani relocated to Mexico with his family to produce powdered milk and cheese. His son, David Viviani, and business partner Fred Harland operated the Factory. The business saw success again with the expansion of a sandwich shop at Sonoma Valley High School and expanded retail operations at the Factory, which included offering local wines, and they implemented a new marketing campaign for Sonoma Jack cheeses.

Pete Viviani returned from Mexico in 1971. Cheese production increased as a result of the increase of tourism in Sonoma Valley. In 1981, they released Sonoma Jack Hot Pepper, the first cheese in California that was made with jalapeños and crushed red pepper.

=== The Sonoma Cheese Factory today ===
“If you haven’t been there, go there. It’s a delightful place with a huge variety of excellent cheeses and you can watch the cheese-making through big window.” - Michele Anna Jordan, Sonoma West Times and News, 1988

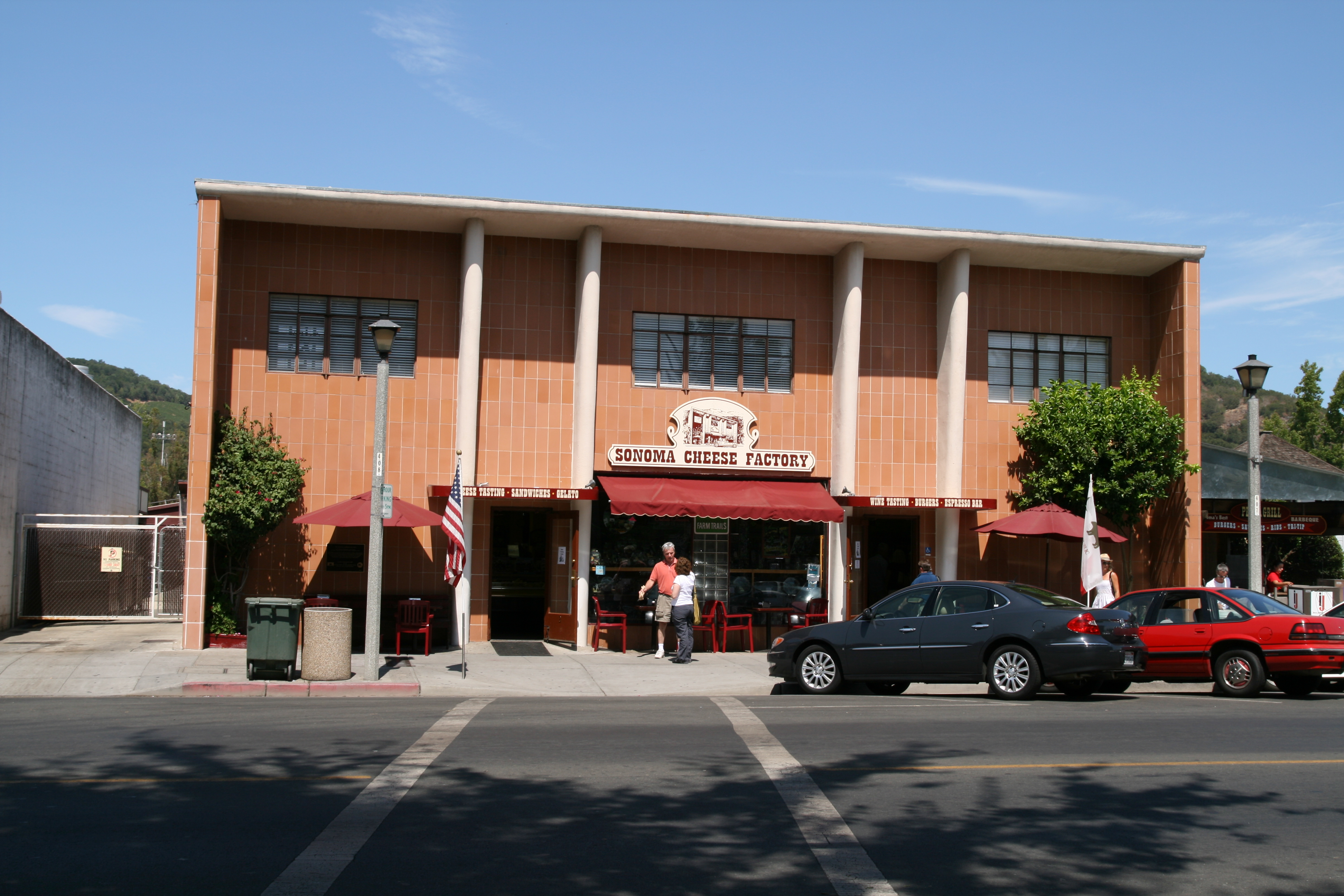
Sonoma Cheese Factory in 2008

By the end of 1985, David Vivani served as president and Harland oversaw the cheese plant as general manager. Peter Vivani served as vice president of the company. The Sonoma Cheese Factory had annual sales of $5 million and was distributing their cheese nationwide. The company had 50 employees and produced 3 million pounds of Sonoma Jack annually.

The following year, the television program Lifestyles of the Rich and Famous shot an episode in Sonoma. The show's host, Robin Leach toured the town with actor Judith Ledford, including sampling cheese with David Vivani at the Sonoma Cheese Factory.

In 2001, listeria was found in a cheese sample at their production facility in Sonoma California, which stopped production and required production to be relocated to a new facility in Crescent City California. The next year the Viviani's split management of the retail operations to Pete Viviani and David Viviani oversaw cheese production. Monterey Gourmet Foods became an 80% stakeholder in Sonoma Cheese Factory in 2005. Since the majority, if not all, of the cheese was no longer being produced at the Sonoma Cheese Factory site in Sonoma, the facility underwent renovations to focus on retail in 2005. In 2012, the Viviani family re-acquired full ownership of the company.

The Native Sons of the Golden West placed a plaque on the front exterior of the Sonoma Cheese Factory in 2009 to celebrate the legacy founder Celso Viviani and the Viviani cheese-making family. Pete Viviani died shortly after the dedication in June 2009.

In 2020, the Sonoma Cheese Factory sold to Sonoma's Best Hospitality Group.

In June 2024, the Sonoma Cheese Factory was sold to Anidel Hospitality.

== Cheese ==
At its inception, the Sonoma Cheese Factory produced Italian-style hard cheeses and fresh cheeses, specifically cottage and cream cheese. Eventually, production shifted towards semi-hard cheeses, including their flagship cheese: Jack. Made from pasteurized cow milk, the Factory's Jack is a semi-hard cheese. They were the first cheese company in California to make a pepper Jack, which uses jalapeño and chili flakes for a spicy flavor. Today, they produce other Jack cheeses including garlic, Mediterranean, habanero, chipotle, pesto, smoked, lavender and a mild Cheddar cheese.

In 1987, the Sonoma Cheese Factory became the first California cheesemaker to win a medal in the United States Championship Cheese Contest, winning a gold and a bronze medal for their Sonoma Garlic Jack.
