= Tangenital Madness on a Pleasant Side of Hell =

Studio album by Demented Are Go
- Released: 1993
- Genre: Psychobilly
- Label: Fury Records

Demented Are Go chronology
Orgasmic Nightmare (1991)	Tangenital Madness on a Pleasant Side of Hell (1993)	Hellucifernation (1999)

Tangenital Madness on a Pleasant Side of Hell is the fifth full-length album released by the Welsh Psychobilly band Demented Are Go.

== Track listing ==
1. "Intro"
2. "Brand New Corpse"
3. "Mongoloid"
4. "Gambling Queen"
5. "Dream Space Baby"
6. "Zombie Stalk"
7. "Queen of Disease"
8. "Where You Gonna Go"
9. "Fairies at the Bottom of My Garden"
10. "Aces High"
11. "Thrill Killers"
12. "Up from the Skies"
13. "Got Good Lovin'"
14. "The Chase"

== Personnel ==
- Spark "Douche" Retard - Screaming and Ranting
- Antenormous "The Horse" - Death Beat and Keyboards
- Lightning Lex Luther - "Geetar" And Distortions
- Gray Boy "Get Off My Land" Grant - Big Bass Fiddle
