= Tony Moll =

American football player (born 1983)

No. 75, 79
- Position: Guard

Personal information
- Born: August 23, 1983 (age 43); Sonoma, California, U.S.
- Listed height: 6 ft 5 in (1.96 m)
- Listed weight: 315 lb (143 kg)

Career information
- High school: Sonoma Valley
- College: Nevada
- NFL draft: 2006: 5th round, 165th overall pick

Career history
- Green Bay Packers (2006–2008); Baltimore Ravens (2009–2010); Jacksonville Jaguars (2011)*; San Diego Chargers (2011); Washington Redskins (2012)*
- * Offseason or practice squad member only

Career NFL statistics
- Games played: 63
- Games started: 22
- Fumble recoveries: 3
- Stats at Pro Football Reference

Anthony Gene Moll (born August 23, 1983) is an American former professional football player who was a guard and offensive tackle in the National Football League (NFL). He was selected in the fifth round of the 2006 NFL draft by the Green Bay Packers. He played college football for the Nevada Wolf Pack.

He was also a member of the Baltimore Ravens, Jacksonville Jaguars, San Diego Chargers, and Washington Redskins.

== College career ==
=== Sonoma ===
Born in Sonoma, California, he attended Sonoma Valley High School where he was an All-Empire defensive end. He graduated from Sonoma Valley in 2001.

=== Nevada ===
Moll played college football for the Wolf Pack at the University of Nevada, Reno. He played tight end until his senior year when he was switched to left tackle, a position at which he earned first-team all-Western Athletic Conference honors. Nevada coach Chris Ault said of Moll, "He's as mentally tough as any athlete I've ever coached."

== Professional career ==
=== Green Bay Packers ===
Moll was selected by the Green Bay Packers in the fifth round of the 2006 NFL draft. Considered a "fringe" NFL draft pick, Packers coach Mike McCarthy said, "If you'd told me Tony Moll would be starting for us in the spring after the first minicamp, frankly, I would've taken that bet." Even his mother, Gina Moll, noted, "When he first got drafted, we said 'OK, let's just hope he makes the practice squad.'" The 6 foot, 5 inch rookie surprised McCarthy, earned a spot in the Packers' lineup, and became "a blocking mainstay" for Green Bay quarterback Brett Favre. He appeared in all 16 games for the 2006 Packers, starting five games each at right guard and right tackle. In his second season with the Packers, Moll suffered a pinched nerve in his neck during training camp. He recalled, "There was a flash of pain. It resulted in pins and needles in my fingers, like when you hit your funny bone." He missed the first five games of the season due to the injury, started the next three games, and then re-injured himself. He appeared in a total of nine games in 2007, three as a starter. As a third-year player in 2008, Moll split his playing time between the right guard and right tackle positions. He appeared in 14 games for the 2008 Packers, but only five as a starter.

=== Baltimore Ravens ===
In September 2009, Moll was traded to the right Baltimore Ravens for defensive back Derrick Martin. Moll appeared in five games for the Ravens in 2009, none as a starter. In April 2010, the Ravens re-signed Moll as a restricted free agent to a one-year, $1.176 million contract.

=== Jacksonville Jaguars ===
Moll signed with the Jacksonville Jaguars on August 10, 2011. He was released on September 3.

=== San Diego Chargers ===
The San Diego Chargers signed him on November 15, 2011. He became an unrestricted free agent at the end of the 2011 season.

=== Washington Redskins ===
The Washington Redskins signed him on August 4, 2012. He was released by the team on August 27.
