= Pharmaceutical Accountability Foundation =

The Pharmaceutical Accountability Foundation (in Dutch Stichting Farma Ter Verantwoording) is a Dutch foundation based in Amsterdam that takes action against what it regards as excessive prices for medicines. It was set up in 2018 and works through complaints to regulators and court cases.

== History ==
Pharmaceutical Accountability Foundation was established in Amsterdam in July 2018 to deal with pharmaceutical companies that demand excessive prices for medicines in the Netherlands. This followed a report by the Raad voor de Volksgezondheid en Zorg in 2017. Wilbert Bannenberg, an epidemiologist, became its chairman. The foundation set out to deploy both health and pharmaceutical expertise and lawyers.

Foundation have investigated 12 cases all with the same business model, which they describe as: "buy an old, cheap product, get the old versions off the market, win orphan drug designation, and put up the price as high as you can." It called for reform of the European orphan drug legislation needs to be reformed.

=== Chenodeoxycholic acid ===
Its complaint against Leadiant Biosciences, formerly known as Sigma-Tau Rare Disease, led the Netherlands Authority for Consumers and Markets (ACM) to fine the company in 2021 for the price of chenodeoxycholic acid (CDCA). The drug is used to treat about 60 children with cerebrotendineous xanthomatosis (CTX) in the Netherlands. CDCA had been sold under the name Chenofalk for the treatment of gallstones at a cost of €0.28 per capsule and used off label for the treatment of cerebrotendineous xanthomatosis. In 2008 Sigma-Tau took over CDCA product from another manufacturer, when the maximum price in the Netherlands was €46 for a pack of 100 capsules. At the end of 2009 the company renamed it Xenbilox and raised the price to €885 per pack, and in 2014, when it applied for orphan drug status and a marketing authorisation, to €3,103. Orphan status was granted at the end of 2014. The EU marketing authorisation followed in April 2017 and gave the company ten years of market exclusivity for CDCA in the treatment of CTX. In June 2017 Leadiant replaced Xenbilox with CDCA-Leadiant and raised the price to €14,000 per pack, or €140 per capsule, which came to about €153,000 per patient per year. Bannenberg claimed that Leadiant is abusing its dominant market position.

Leadiant has been compared to Martin Shkreli. Bannanberg was quoted as saying “This may be legal but it’s not socially acceptable.” The VU University Medical Center proposed to manufacture its own version at cost price, and this has been supported by Dutch health insurers. The foundation's complaints have been echoed by Bruno Bruins, Minister for Medical Care.

The foundation took the case to the ACM in 2018. The record of the ACM, and previously of the Netherlands Competition Authority in the medicines sector has been described as poor. In July 2021 the ACM ruled that Leadiant had abused its dominant position by charging an excessive price for CDCA-Leadiant and fined the company €19,569,500. On Leadiant's objection, the ACM decided in June 2023 that the company had not been dominant during the months when Amsterdam UMC supplied its alternative, and lowered the fine to €17,044,000.

=== Other cases ===
Under political pressure, the pharmaceutical companies in the Netherlands have been working on a code of conduct which they say will provide guarantees for responsible pricing, and keep speculators out of the door.

In April 2020, Bannenberg said that the Netherlands' vulnerability to medicine shortages had been exposed by the COVID-19 pandemic in the Netherlands because the country was too dependent on medicines from low-wage countries and vaccines from big pharma. The Netherlands was not a priority for supply. He wanted to see more local production and different manufacturers, even if this meant that generic drugs would be more expensive.
