= Suprabha Devi =

- Born: 24 December 1938; Digboi
- Died: 14 June 2011; Guwahati
- Occupations: Film director, producer, lyricist
- Spouse: Dwijendra Narayan

Suprabha Devi was an Assamese film producer and the first female director from Assam. She directed the films Nayanmoni in 1984 and Sarvajan in 1986. In 1985, she received the Shilpi Diwas Award.

== Early life ==
Suprabha Devi was born on 24 December 1938 in the oil town of Digboi, Assam. Her father's name was Jogendra Kumar Rajkhowa, and her mother's name was Swarnaprabha Rajkhowa.

== Career ==
After marrying Dwijendra Narayan, Suprabha Devi became involved in the Assamese film industry. She was the first female film director from Assam. Along with her husband, she co-directed films such as Jog-Biyog (1970), Taramai (1972), Marami (1976), and Rangdhali (1979). She became the first Assamese woman film director with Nayanmoni (1984), for which she was conferred with the Shilpi Diwas Award in 1985.

In 1986, she directed Sarvajan, based on a story by Lakshminath Bezbarua. For this film, Hiren Choudhury from Tezpur collaborated as a co-director. She was also a lyricist and produced several documentaries and television series broadcast on Guwahati Doordarshan Kendra. In 2003, she directed a TV series titled Jilikaba Luitor Paar.

== Death ==
After battling kidney disease for five years, Suprabha Devi died on 14 June 2011 at the International Hospital in Guwahati. She was 73 years old at the time of her death.
