= Dante Ambrosio =

- Born: Dante Lacsamana Ambrosio; July 15, 1951
- Died: June 4, 2011 (aged 59)
- Occupations: Ethnologist, activist, college professor

Dante Lacsamana Ambrosio (15 July 1951 – 4 June 2011) was a Filipino ethnologist, astronomer, college professor, and activist who was known as the "Father of Philippine Ethnoastronomy."

== Education and career ==
Ambrosio attended Philippine Science High School. It was during his time at PSHS when he decided to become an activist. However he had to transfer to Tondo High School due to his heart condition. He became involved in the protest against the administration of President Ferdinand Marcos during First Quarter Storm

Ambrosio is also known for his written works which discussed the importance of celestial bodies to various Philippine ethnic groups especially in his 2005 University of the Philippines journal article published at the titled Balatik: Katutubong Bituin ng mga Pilipino. His research found that Orion and the Pleiades are locally known as Balatik and Moroporo respectively. He has looked on studies by foreigners on Philippine anthro-astronomical studies dating back as early as the 1950s.
