= Diocese of Nouakchott =

Latin Catholic ecclesiastical jurisdiction in Mauritania

Diocese of Nouakchott Dioecesis Nuakchottensis
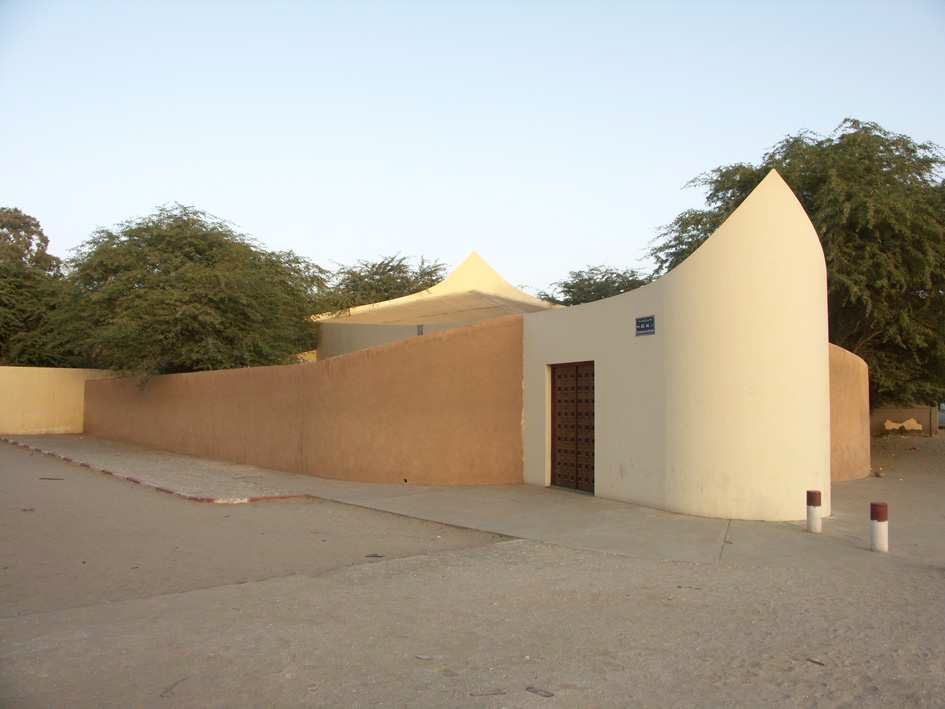
- Cathedral of Saint Joseph

Location
- Country: Mauritania
- Metropolitan: Immediately exempt to the Holy See

Statistics
- Area: 1,030,700 km^{2} (398,000 sq mi)
- Population: Total; Catholics: (as of 2004); 2,600,000; 4,500

Information
- Denomination: Catholic Church
- Sui iuris church: Latin Church
- Rite: Roman Rite
- Cathedral: Cathedral of Saint Joseph, Nouakchott

Current leadership
- Pope: Leo XIV
- Bishop: Victor Ndione
- Bishops emeritus: Martin Albert Happe, M. Afr.

The Diocese of Nouakchott is a Latin Church ecclesiastical territory or diocese of the Catholic Church situated in Nouakchott, Mauritania. It is the only Catholic ecclesiastical territory in Mauritania. The Cathedral of St. Joseph is located in Nouakchott.

== History ==
- 18 December 1965: Established as Diocese of Nouakchott from the Apostolic Prefecture of Saint-Louis du Sénégal in Senegal.

== Current situation ==
According to Bishop Victor Ndione, the diocese has around 6000 members who are all foreigners, mostly from neighbouring countries such as Senegal, Gambia, Mali and Guinea Bissau. In an interview with pontifical foundation Aid to the Church in Need, the bishop said that the Church "enjoys the goodwill of the authorities and of the population, thanks to its social and charitable activities" and that there is "no overt persecution", describing the local strand of Islam as "traditionally moderate and marked by Sufism".

Much of the pastoral work concerns care for migrants passing through Mauritania en route to Europe.

The diocese has only two incardinated priests, with another 11 serving as religious or missionaries. There are also around 30 religious sisters, all foreign.

Humanitarian work is a large part of the diocese's work. This include setting up stations to provide dairy products and taking care of children with disability.

== Leadership ==
- Bishops of Nouakchott
  - Archbishop (titular) Michel-Jules-Joseph-Marie Bernard (died 2 January 1993), C.S.Sp. (15 January 1966 – 21 December 1973)
  - Bishop Robert Marie Jean Victor de Chevigny (died 11 June 2011), C.S.Sp. (21 December 1973 – 10 July 1995)
  - Bishop Martin Albert Happe, M. Afr. (10 July 1995 – 10 February 2024)
  - Bishop Victor Ndione (10 February 2024 – )

== See also ==
- List of Catholic dioceses in Morocco, Mauretania and Western Sahara
- Catholicism in Mauritania
