= William J. Spahr =

Central Intelligence Agency analyst

William Joseph Spahr (June 28, 1921 – June 13, 2011) was a prominent American Central Intelligence Agency analyst, author, and retired Army colonel who was an authority on Soviet military policy.

== Biography ==
Born in Philadelphia, Pennsylvania, Spahr graduated from the United States Military Academy at West Point in 1943 with a BS in civil engineering. In 1953 he graduated from Columbia University with a master's degree in political science, and graduated from the National War College in 1964; in 1973 George Washington University awarded him a doctorate in international relations.

He spent 26 years in the U.S. Army and served in Europe during World War II. Following the war he joined the CIA and in 1983 was the CIA's delegate at the Strategic Arms Reduction Talks, acting as part of the delegation led by Edward Rowny.

He was married and had three children.

== Accolades ==
Spahr earned the Bronze Star Medal, the Distinguished Service Medal, and the CIA Career Intelligence Medal.

== Bibliography ==
Spahr authored two books on World War II military leaders of the Soviet Union.

- Zhukov: The Rise and Fall of a Great Captain (1993)
- Stalin’s Lieutenants: A Study of Command Under Duress (1997)
