= Ron Dunn (footballer) =

Australian rules footballer

Personal information
- Full name: Ronald Henry Dunn
- Born: 19 April 1928
- Died: 2 June 2011 (aged 83)
- Original team: Northcote
- Height: 170 cm (5 ft 7 in)
- Weight: 65 kg (143 lb)

Playing career^{1}
Years	Club	Games (Goals)
1950–51	Fitzroy	14 (0)
1952	Essendon	2 (0)
Total		16 (0)
- ^{1} Playing statistics correct to the end of 1952.

Ronald Henry Dunn (19 April 1928 – 2 June 2011) was a former Australian rules footballer who played with Fitzroy and Essendon in the Victorian Football League (VFL).
