= Mark Gerard =

Mark Gerard (6 October 1934 – 21 June 2011) was an American equine veterinarian. He was born in Brooklyn, New York, and graduated from Cornell University.

As a student, he worked as an exercise rider for, among others, Hall of Fame trainer James E. Fitzsimmons.

Gerard started practice as a veterinarian for racehorses, some highly successful ones, such as Canonero II, who won the Kentucky Derby; he also cared for Triple Crown winner Secretariat. In 1977, he masterminded a highly publicized scandal involving horse switching. He had imported two horses from Uruguay, a champion named Cinzano, and the much cheaper Lebon. After Lebon had under-performed in his earlier races, Gerard ran Cinzano under Lebon's name. Entered as "Lebon", Cinzano subsequently won as a 57-1 outsider, at New York's Belmont Park, and Gerard collected a $77,920 winning on a bet.

Later, a Uruguayan journalist recognized the horse as Cinzano from a newspaper photo, and an investigation was started. The story was broken in the States on October 21, 1977, by News World's racing editor, Daniel Keating in New York. When John Piesen of the New York Post told Keating that he had broken a story on October 23, Keating told him he broke it two days ago. Keating also asked Rupert Murdoch to cease claiming the Post had broken the story. Nothing happened. In September 1978, Gerard, represented by attorney F. Lee Bailey, testified that Lebon had "died in an accident at Gerard's New York farm the day he and Cinzano arrived from Uruguay", and his wife testified that she had switched horses without his knowledge. Gerard was convicted of fraud, then fined $1,000 and sentenced to one year in prison, which was shortened on appeal by four months, but was not required to forfeit any more of his winnings.
