= Robert Marie Jean Victor de Chevigny =

Robert Marie Jean Victor de Chevigny, C.S.Sp.
- Bishop of Diocese of Nouakchott
- Church: Roman Catholic Church
- See: Diocese of Nouakchott
- In office: 1974–95
- Predecessor: Michel-Jules-Joseph-Marie Bernard
- Successor: Martin Albert Happe
- Previous post(s): Bishop

Orders
- Ordination: 3 October 1948

Personal details
- Born: 2 August 1920; Besançon, France
- Died: 11 June 2011 (aged 90); Chevilly-Larue, France

Robert Marie Jean Victor de Boissonneaux de Chevigny (2 August 1920 – 11 June 2011) was a French bishop of the Roman Catholic Church.

Chevigny was born in Besançon, France and was ordained a priest on 3 October 1948 in the Holy Ghost Fathers. He was appointed Bishop of the Diocese of Nouakchott on 21 December 1973 and ordained on 23 February 1974. Chevigny retired from the Diocese of Nouakchott on 10 July 1995.
