= Fyodor Reshetnikov (scientist) =

- Born: Fyodor Grigoryevich Reshetnikov; 25 November 1919; Marchykhyna Buda, Glukhovsky Uezd, Chernihiv Governorate, Ukrainian SSR
- Died: 19 June 2011 (aged 91); Moscow, Russia
- Awards: Order For Merit to the Fatherland 4th class (Russian Federation), 1995 The State Stalin Prize, 1951 the USSR State Prize, 1975 the USSR State Prize, 1985
- Scientific career
- Fields: Chemistry; Physical chemistry Metallurgy

Fyodor Grigoryevich Reshetnikov (Russian: Фёдор Григорьевич Решетников; 25 November 1919 – 19 June 2011) was a Soviet and Russian physical chemist and metallurgist. Reshetnikov became a corresponding member of the Academy of Sciences of the Soviet Union in 1974, academician (full member) of the Russian Academy of Sciences in 1992 and was a three-time recipient of the USSR State Prize (1951, 1975, 1985).

Reshetnikov graduated in 1942 from the Moscow Institute of Non-Ferrous Metals and Gold (now part of the State University of Non-Ferrous Metals and Gold in Krasnoyarsk). He served in the Red Army during World War II (1942–45).
