= Kim Jun-yop =

South Korean historian (1920–2011)

- Hangul: 김준엽
- Hanja: 金俊燁
- RR: Gim Junyeop
- MR: Kim Chunyŏp

Kim Jun-yop (Korean: 김준엽; 26 August 1920 – 7 June 2011) was president of Korea University, a historian focusing on China and North Korea issues. Kim declined a nomination from Roh Tae-woo to become Prime Minister of South Korea in 1990, preferring to stay in academia.

He attended National Central University (later renamed Nanjing University in mainland China and reinstated in Taiwan), majoring in history. He has served as visiting professors at Harvard University and Princeton University.

In January 2005, Kim was chairman of the Institute of Social Sciences in Korea and chairman of the Dae Woo Educational Foundation. In December 2009, Kim was the recipient of the Korea Foundation Award.

== See also ==
- History of North Korea
- History of China
