= Alan Haberman =

American supermarket executive (1929–2011)

Alan Haberman (July 27, 1929 in Worcester, Massachusetts – June 12, 2011 in Newton, Massachusetts) was an American supermarket executive who is credited with popularizing the use of the barcode in commerce internationally. Haberman was a founder and board member of the Uniform Code Council. He graduated from Harvard College and Harvard Business School.

== See also ==
- George J. Laurer, U.P.C. creator
