= Fanny de Sivers =

Estonian linguist

Fanny de Sivers (maiden name: Isak; 20 October 1920 – 22 June 2011) was an Estonian linguist, literature researcher, and essayist.

== Biography ==
Fanny de Sivers was born in Pärnu. She studied humanities and arts at the University of Tartu from (1938 to 1941), left Estonia and moved to Germany in 1941, marrying von Sivers. She studied at the universities of Breslau, Würzburg and Innsbruck and acquired the academic degree of license in Paris and Lund.

Beginning in 1949, Sivers lived in France, where she worked as an interpreter and secretary at state institutions, and from 1964 to 1986 she worked as linguist at the French National Centre for Scientific Research. She was a visiting professor at the University of Tartu from 1993–1994.

She published numerous articles on language studies and literature; she also translated works of Estonian authors into French and vice versa. Numerous collections of her articles and essays have been published in Estonia since the end of Soviet regime.

Fanny de Sivers was a devoted Christian. She died in Eaubonne, near Paris.
