= Vladimir Shalin =

Russian footballer and coach

Personal information
- Full name: Vladimir Radiyevich Shalin
- Date of birth: 28 March 1965
- Place of birth: Moscow, Soviet Union
- Date of death: 9 June 2011 (aged 46)
- Place of death: Moscow, Russia
- Height: 1.80 m (5 ft 11 in)
- Positions: Striker; midfielder

Youth career
- FC Dynamo Moscow

Senior career*
Years	Team	Apps	(Gls)
1981–1986	FC Dynamo Moscow	2	(0)
1987	FC Dynamo-2 Moscow	19	(2)
1987–1988	FC Fakel Voronezh	19	(5)

Managerial career
- 2002–2007: FC Dynamo Moscow (reserves assistant)
- 2008–2011: FC Dynamo Moscow (reserves assistant)
- * Club domestic league appearances and goals

Vladimir Radiyevich Shalin (Russian: Владимир Радиевич Шалин; 28 March 1965 – 9 June 2011) was a Russian professional football player and coach.
