= Fondazione Sigma-Tau =

Scientific organisation based in Italy

Fondazione Sigma-Tau is an institution that aims to promote and share scientific knowledge and interdisciplinary dialogue between branches of learning. It was created as a charitable organization and is recognized by law with Presidential Decree No. 648 of 4 August 1986. Chaired by Silvia Cavazza, Sigma-Tau acts as a national and international point of reference for research development and cultural debate. The foundation also promotes the since the progress of science by introducing the concepts of globality and complexity of the human science.

Fondazione Sigma-Tau fosters outreach and development activities, such as seminars, conferences, lectures, round tables and events, in collaboration with universities, research institutes, and the world of culture and science.

== Projects ==
Since 1989, Fondazione Sigma-Tau has launched important projects and many conferences and meetings from which a vast number of publications have arisen, such as the volumes published by Bari based Editore Laterza, from the Lezioni Italiane (Italian Lessons) cycle, and the proceedings from SpoletoScienza in particular.

Founded in 1989 by Claudio Cavazza, SpoletoScienza is the scientific section of the Festival dei Due Mondi.
