= Robert Morgan (historian) =

Canadian historian (1938–2011)

Robert Morgan ONS
- Born: Robert James Morgan; 23 October 1938; Windsor, Ontario, Canada
- Died: 4 June 2011 (aged 72); Cape Breton, Nova Scotia, Canada
- Occupations: Historian; archivist

Robert James Morgan ONS (23 October 1938 – 4 June 2011) was a Canadian historian and archivist. He was posthumously awarded the Order of Nova Scotia in 2012.

== Early life and education ==
Robert Morgan was born on 23 October 1938 in Windsor, Ontario, to parents Herbert Morgan and Rose Gilboe. He graduated with a Bachelor of Arts with Honours from the University of Windsor in 1961, and subsequently took a position as a summer lecturer at Xavier College in Sydney, Nova Scotia. He taught here during summers while attending Queen's University, where he graduated with a Master of Arts (MA) in Canadian History in 1964. After finishing his MA, Morgan was appointed as Assistant Professor at Xavier College, a position he held until 1966; he then moved to Ottawa and worked with the Public Archives of Canada as an archivist until 1968.

In 1969, Morgan began doctoral studies at the University of Ottawa. While pursuing his doctorate, he lectured at Loyola College in Montreal in 1970 and 1971, before graduating with a PhD in History in 1972.

== Career ==
Morgan was the Senior Historian at the Fortress of Louisbourg from 1971 until 1976. In 1976, he was appointed as the Director of the Beaton Institute Archives at Cape Breton University following the death of Margaret Beaton. Under his leadership, the Beaton Institute developed into a substantial resource centre, becoming the second largest archival collection in Nova Scotia. Morgan was among the founding members of the National Archival Appraisal Board, serving as its Vice President in 1976.

In 1982, Morgan was chair of the organizational meeting which laid the groundwork for the Council of Nova Scotia Archives. He was among the five archivists who wrote the Council's constitution and raised the necessary funds for its establishment, and served as the first President of the Council from 1983 to 1985.

Morgan spent 28 years as part of the history faculty at Cape Breton University, and was recognized as a pioneer in the study of local history. With a particular interest in the history of Cape Breton during the colonial era, he helped to establish a Cape Breton Studies program at the university, as well as Cultural Studies and Museum Studies programs. Appointed as the first Dean of Research and Development at Cape Breton University in 1990, Morgan oversaw the establishment of the university's Student, Culture, and Heritage Centre which would later house the archives, art gallery, and Centre for Cape Breton Studies.

== Death and legacy ==
Morgan died on 4 June 2011 in Cape Breton at the age of 72. He wrote four books across his career, including Rise Again! The Story of Cape Breton Island, which was given to every student at Cape Breton University in 2019 in a donation of 5,000 copies from Breton Books. The book was the first major study of Cape Breton history in almost 150 years.

In 2012, Morgan was posthumously awarded the Order of Nova Scotia in recognition of his "over 50 years to preserving and sharing the history of Nova Scotia, particularly Cape Breton Island."

== Publications ==
- Morgan, Robert (1972). Orphan Outpost: Cape Breton Colony, 1784–1820 (PhD thesis). University of Ottawa. OCLC 270934240.
- — (1977). More Essays in Cape Breton History. Windsor, N.S.: Lancelot Press. ISBN 978-0-8899-9077-7.
- — (2000). Early Cape Breton: From Founding to Famine. Wreck Cove, N.S.: Breton Books. ISBN 978-1-8954-1560-5.
- — (2004). Perseverance: The Story of Cape Breton's University College 1952–2002. Sydney, N.S.: University College of Cape Breton Press. ISBN 978-0-9203-3699-1.
- — (2008). Rise Again! The Story of Cape Breton Island. Toronto: Breton Books. ISBN 978-1-8954-1581-0.
