= Leadiant Biosciences =

Italian pharmaceutical company

Sigma-Tau
- Type: Private
- Industry: Pharmaceutical
- Founded: 1957
- Headquarters: Pomezia, Italy
- Key people: Cavazza Family
- Products: Medicines
- Revenue: €697 million (2013)
- Number of employees: 1919 (2013)
- Website: www.sigma-tau.it

Leadiant Biosciences, formerly known as Sigma-Tau Industrie Farmaceutiche Riunite, was founded in 1957 by research chemist Claudio Cavazza.

In 2018 Leadiant Biosciences came under fire for creating a monopoly for CDCA and unnecessarily increasing the price by a factor of 335.

Construction began in 1964 of an industrial facility in Pomezia equipped with state-of-the-art automatic production machinery to provide steady employment for 64 people. The choice of Pomezia for its headquarters created one of the first industrialization and urban development initiatives in an area of Central-southern Italy that had previously been mainly devoted to agriculture. The company developed the Rekord B12 vitamin complex in September 1966.

== From the 1970s to today ==
From the 1970s onwards, Sigma-Tau focused on experimenting with new medicines for rare diseases – a commitment that in 1984 would cause it to become the fourth largest pharmaceutical company in the world and assignee in the United States of an Orphan Drug Designation, subsequently receiving another seven. With the discovery in the 1970s of Carnitine deficiency syndromes, an illness with a fatal outcome, Sigma-Tau focused the investigative efforts of its laboratories on research into a molecule capable of opposing the disease. This was to bring about the creation of L-carnitine, one of the few Italian pharmaceutical products widely received outside Italy, and which was recognized by the United States in 1984 for its value as a life-saving medicine. The chemical and biologic pharmacology study of carnitine, a substance of natural origin, enabled a greater understanding of its efficacy in correcting the biochemical and metabolic defects at the base of numerous other pathologies.

Fondazione Sigma-Tau was created in 1986 as a charitable organization to develop research, promote scientific and cultural progress, and safeguard the results of scientific investigation.

== Structure of Sigma-Tau group ==
The Sigma-Tau Group achieved a corporate turnover of 697 million euro in 2013, employs a workforce of 1,919 and possesses a portfolio of more than 100 products marketed in Italy and abroad, with regards to the following therapeutic areas: Cardiometabolic disorders, Orthopedic and Rheumatologic diseases, Broncho-Pneumology, Infectology, Oncology, Neurology, Gastroenterology, Dermatology, Urology and Gynecology, Malaria and Rare Diseases. The Group is a leader in the nutraceutical industry and produces supplements of high scientific interest. Its product range also includes high-end dermocosmetics lines, as well as oral and personal care products. Since 1998 it has filed 297 patents confirming itself, among the national Italian-owned, as a major player in the registration of new molecules or important technological innovations. The Sigma-Tau Group has headquarters in Pomezia (Rome, Italy), and subsidiaries in France, Switzerland, Belgium, the Netherlands, Germany, UK, and India, and with production plants in Italy as well as in Spain and US (Indianapolis). The ability to expand its presence on the international stage, mainly through the activation of collaborative research with numerous scientific institutions in America, Europe, and Asia, is the key to Sigma-Tau's future. Since the pioneering studies conducted by its founder Claudio Cavazza, Sigma-Tau has always proved to be a groundbreaker in the discovery of drugs for rare and orphan diseases: for instance, Carnitine for the treatment of primary or secondary “specific deficiencies” was the second product ever to obtain the designation as “orphan drug” by the US FDA. Leveraging this background, the company has confirmed its commitment to developing drugs with orphan indications over the years and has acquired Enzon's “specialty pharma” portfolio. With eight products for the treatment of rare and neglected diseases, today Sigma-Tau is a pharmaceutic player acting at the forefront in the treatment of Rare Diseases. The goal of its recently created Global Rare Disease Business Unit is to contribute to the progress in the knowledge, diagnosis, and treatment of Rare Diseases.

Sigma-Tau in collaboration with the non-profit organization Medicines for Malaria Venture (MMV) has developed a new medicine for the treatment of malaria a fixed combination consisting of dihydroartemisinin and piperaquine, judged to be one of the most effective antimalaria medicines available and the best combination containing artemisinin. The registration dossier was presented on July 3, 2009, in Europe (EMEA)and approved in 2011. The new drug has obtained registration in Cambodia, Ghana, and Tanzania and is started in Burkina Faso, Mozambique, and other key African endemic countries.

Sigma-Tau is the main element of a group in which other companies operate, in accordance with the prospects of the corporate development plan.

- Avantgarde - Pomezia

Founded in 1982 and active both in the pharmaceutical market and that of consumer products sold in pharmacies. Avantgarde has developed its business within the dermatological, gynaecological and paediatric sectors; for consumer products the focus is geared to dermocosmetic sector and to oral hygiene with OTC products.

- Biosint - Sermoneta

Incorporated in 1979 as part of the Sigma-Tau Group, Biosint is currently a world-leading producer of L-Carnitine derived by chemical synthesis. The company manufactures and distributes active pharmaceutical ingredients, lactic ferments and nutraceutical products obtained by chemical synthesis and fermentation. Its operations are carried out in full compliance with current good manufacturing practices (cGMP), at establishments approved by FDA and main domestic and international Regulatory Authorities.

- Biofutura - Milan

Biofutura was founded in 2001 with the objective of developing pharmaceutical products in the cure of diseases of the central nervous system and respiratory system. Activity also spread to the development and marketing of products derived from the carnitine biological system.

- Research Centre - Pomezia

Responsible for the research and development of substances active on important areas of treatment including oncology and immunology and on diseases that are rare, neglected and with high social impact.

- Sigma-Tau Research Inc. - Gaithersburg, USA

Responsible for the clinical development of Sigma-Tau products in the United States.

- Sigma-Tau Research Switzerland - Mendrisio, CH

A recently established research centre that co-ordinates research and development activity relating to selected products and provides clinical development and chemical analytical expertise.

== Social responsibilities ==
While the company claims to operate in absolute respect of ethical principles and existing legislation it received a tremendous amount of negative attention due their action to increase the price of an orphan drug to such extent it became impossible to pay for the drug.

== Environmental responsibilities ==
In 1967 Sigma-Tau became equipped with a water conditioning plant. Since 2005, the commitment to reduce impact on the environment in the elimination of solvents in aid of water in many preparations has produced continuing reduction in CO_{2} emissions that have fallen from 5,932 tons to 5,587 in 2007. Since 2007, Sigma-Tau has begun waste sorting and choosing eco-compatible materials. In the same year, in which Sigma-Tau's environmental costs amounted to around 600,000 euros, a reduction of 8% in the quantity of industrial wastewater was confirmed.

== Humanitarian commitment ==
The Pharmaceutical Accountability Foundation accused the company of abusing its dominant market position when it increased the price of chenodeoxycholic acid from €0.28 per capsule to €140 per capsule in 2018. They said “This may be legal but it’s not socially acceptable.” They said they would make a referral to the Netherlands Authority for Consumers and Markets.

Over the years, Sigma-Tau has developed numerous partnerships, formed with associations and bodies engaged – at national and international level – in projects and activities with a social emphasis, with particular focus on the areas of health and social welfare. The company also provides its medicines free-of-charge to around 40 national and international organizations operating in conflict and post-conflict contexts to support those people stricken by natural disasters and famine.

== Orphan drug misuse and controversy ==
Leadiant Biosciences has been confronted with outrage over the thousandfold increase (from €0,14 to €140) in the price of one of their orphan medicine abusing a loophole in the EU laws that facilitated this due to an existing monopoly for this medicine. CTX patients are dependent on this now unaffordable drug. In 2025, The Dutch ACM fined Leadiant €17M for this economic misuse of power. The discussion reached the EU in 2018 when questioning about it. The US media referred to it back in the days and in late 2021 the topic has, again, been highlighted in the Spanish media.
