= Sonoma Valley High School =

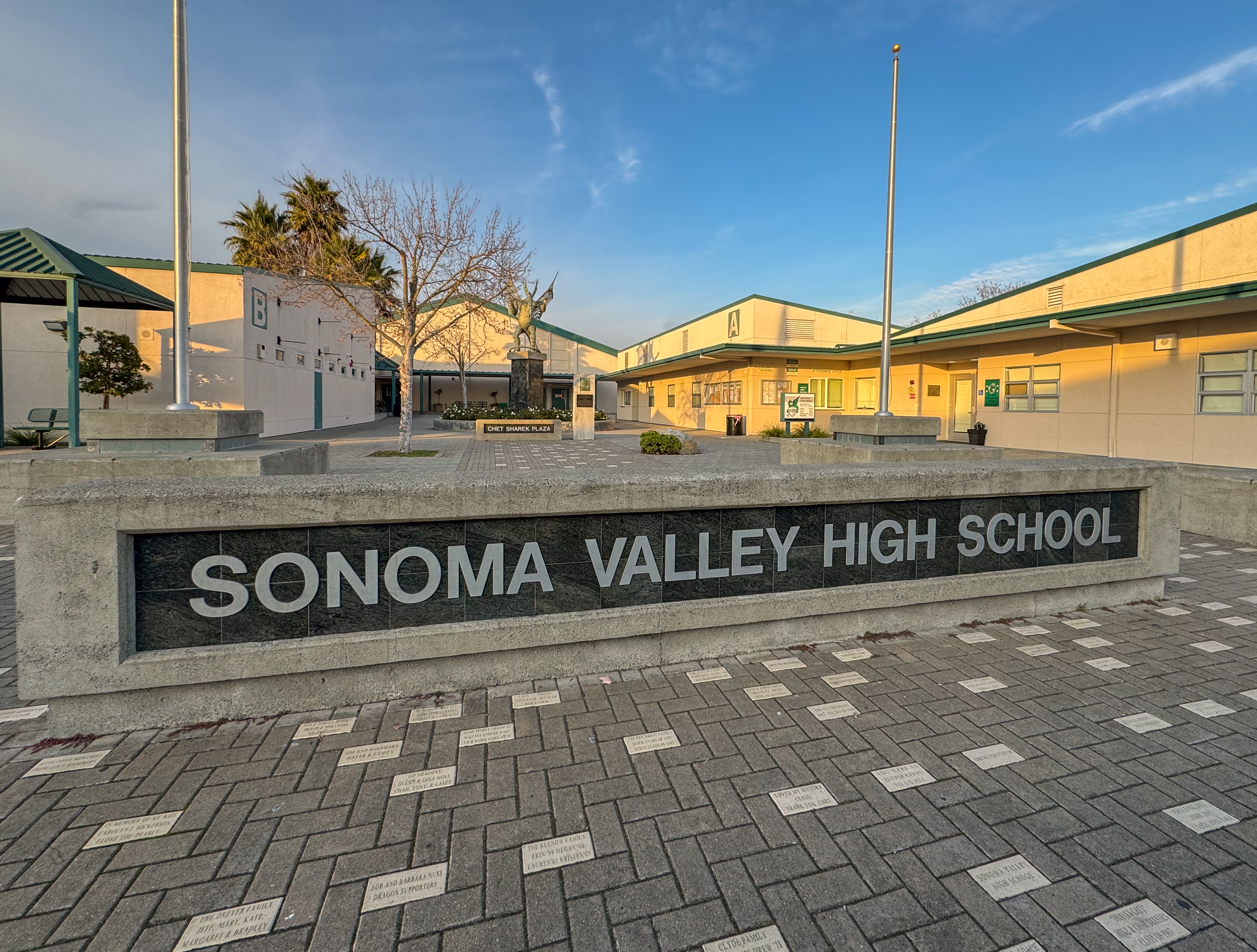

Location
- Sonoma, California; United States; 38°16′58″N 122°27′29″W

Information
- Type: Public
- Established: 1891
- Teaching staff: 58.76 (FTE)
- Enrollment: 1,125 (2023–2024)
- Student to teacher ratio: 19.15
- Nickname: Dragons
- Website: Official website

Sonoma Valley High School (SVHS) is a public high school located in Sonoma, California with approximately 1,127 students as of 2022. It was founded in 1891 and held its first commencement in 1894. It moved to its current campus in 1922. Since that time, there have been numerous additions to campus facilities. It is the only comprehensive high school in the Sonoma Valley Unified School District.

By some accounts, it is about the 25th oldest continuously operating high school in California.

== Awards ==
Sonoma Valley was named a California Distinguished School in 1994.

== Notable alumni ==
- Tommy Everidge, former professional baseball player and current minor league hitting coach
- Ada Limón, the 24th Poet Laureate of the United States
- Tony Moll, former professional football player
- Brian Posehn, comedian and writer
- Tim Schafer, computer game designer and founder of Double Fine
- August Sebastiani, winery founder, named to Vintners Hall of Fame
- Max Simonet, co-creator and host of FishCenter Live on Adult Swim
- David Ury, character actor and Japanese translation specialist

Additionally, an alumni group operates a Dragon Hall of Fame that recognizes a larger group of alumni for artistic, business, educational, athletic, and other achievements.

== See also ==
- Education in the United States
- List of high schools in California
