= Mack Self =

American musician

Wiley Laverne "Mack" Self (22 May 1930 – 14 June 2011) was an American rockabilly singer, songwriter and musician, who recorded for Sun Records in the 1950s and was a member of the Rockabilly Hall of Fame.

== Career ==
Self was born in Calico Bottoms, Phillips County, Arkansas, one of four children, and started playing guitar as a child, often performing with his friend C.W. Gatlin. In 1955, after playing on radio station Kxjk in Forrest City, Arkansas, disc jockey Hal Webber encouraged him to make a recording of his song "Easy to Love". The demo recording then found its way to Sam Phillips of Sun Records, who invited him to audition. Self's first recordings were not released, but Phillips encouraged him to write more songs. He returned to the recording studio in March 1957 to work with producer Jack Clement, and re-recorded "Easy to Love" along with several new songs on which he was backed by guitarist Therlow Brown and bass player Jimmy Evans. "Easy to Love" was then released in 1957 as Sun 273, but by that time its style was regarded as somewhat old-fashioned and it was not a hit. However, Self returned to the recording studio in 1959, and released a second single, "Mad At You" / "Willie Brown". He continued to perform despite his lack of recording success, and in the early 1960s recorded several country singles for the Zone label in Memphis with producer Chips Moman. He also continued to write songs, setting up his own publishing company.

Self gave up the music business in 1963, and established a heating, air and sheet metal business in Helena, Arkansas. He returned to undertake occasional performances after 1992, with his Silver Dollar Band, and was inducted into the Rockabilly Hall of Fame in 1993.

His recordings for the Sun label were reissued on CD by Bear Family Records in the early 1990s, and - with a number of unreleased recordings - by DeeGee Records in Germany in 1997.
