= Timeline of the Israeli–Palestinian conflict in 2011 =

- Timeline of the Israeli–Palestinian conflict
- 2010; 2011; 2012

This page is a listing of incidents of violence in the Israeli–Palestinian conflict in 2011.

- IDT = Israeli (civilians/soldiers) killed by Palestinians; cumulative
- PDT = Palestinians (civilians/militants) killed by Israelis; cumulative.

== January ==
Date	Type	Dead	Injured	Location	Details
1	Rocket attack	0	0	Israel	In the evening, a mortar shell fired by Palestinians in the Gaza Strip landed near a kibbutz in the Sha'ar Hanegev Regional Council. A woman suffered from shock, but no physical injuries or damage were reported. The Popular Front for the Liberation of Palestine claimed responsibility for mortar attacks that day, saying that it had fired four mortars at two military posts in Israel and adding that it would "cling to the option of resistance and confront the Israeli occupation".
2	Shooting	1	0	(Palestinian Authority) West Bank	Israeli soldiers manning the Bekaot checkpoint east of Nablus shoot and kill Ahmad Maslamani, a Palestinian man in his 20s from the village of Toubas who was carrying a weapon.
3	Airstrike	0	2	Gaza Strip	Israel Air Force planes bomb three targets in the Gaza Strip, including two refugee camps, injuring two Palestinians.
4	Airstrike	0	0	Gaza Strip	Israel Air Force planes bomb two targets in the Gaza Strip, reported by Israel to be a tunnel and a training base belonging to Hamas.
6	Shooting	2	0	Gaza Strip	According to Palestinian medics, Israeli troops killed two Palestinians on the border between the Gaza Strip and Israel. The IDF said they shot at two people who were attempting to cross a border fence.
7	Shooting	1	0	(Palestinian Authority) West Bank	Israeli troops shot and killed a 67-year-old Palestinian man during an operation into the West Bank, Palestine to arrest members of Hamas who had recently been released from a Palestinian prison. The man's wife claims that he was killed while sleeping in his bed, while the Jerusalem Post claims that soldiers shot him after they saw him make a "sudden move" and thought he was reaching for a weapon.
7	Airstrike	0	0	Gaza Strip	Israel bombs three targets in the Gaza Strip, targets it claims where activity centers and a Hamas tunnel.
8	Rocket attack	0	3	Israel	At about 2:20 pm, Palestinians in the Gaza Strip fired four 181-millimeter mortar shells at Israel, all of which landed in the Sha'ar Hanegev Regional Council. One of the shells hit a residential area within an agricultural community in the area. Three Thai foreign agricultural workers were injured, one seriously, one moderately and one lightly, all by shrapnel. A number of other people suffered from shock. The shell also killed a cat nearby. Palestinian Islamic Jihad claimed responsibility, saying that it had fired six mortar shells at an Israeli military post near Nahal Oz.
8	Shooting	1	0	(Palestinian Authority) West Bank	Khaldun Samudi, a Palestinian who ran towards a checkpoint is shot dead by Israeli troops. Soldiers later found explosives on Samudi's body.
10	Shooting	1	0	(Palestinian Authority) Gaza Strip	Israel Defense Forces soldiers shot and killed a 65-year-old farmer near their security fence for unknown reasons.
10	Airstrike	0	0	Gaza Strip	Two targets in the Gaza Strip were bombed by the Israeli airforce.
11	Airstrike	1	0	Gaza Strip	An Israeli missile attack kills a Palestinian militant while he was riding a motorcycle in the Gaza Strip.
12	Airstrike	0	0	Gaza Strip	Israel bombs three targets in the Gaza Strip, no injuries are reported.
18	Tank assault	1	2	Gaza Strip	Israeli tanks enter the northern Gaza Strip; some fighting occurs killing one Palestinian and injuring two others.
20	Shooting	1	0	(Palestinian Authority) West Bank	Salem Samudi, a Palestinian whose friend, Khaldun Samudi, was killed by Israelis on the 8th, is shot dead during an exchange of fire with Israeli forces.
27	Explosion	1	0	Gaza Strip	A Palestinian shepherd dies in an explosion while tending his sheep near a nonoperational border crossing.
27	Shooting	1	0	(Palestinian Authority) West Bank	A Palestinian, Uday Maher Qadous, (other sources give the name as Fadi Kadous) is shot and killed by Israeli settlers while he tended his field. One source reports that some Palestinians threw rocks towards the Israeli during the clash.
28	Shooting	1	1	(Palestinian Authority) West Bank	A Palestinian is shot and killed in clashes with Israeli settlers and another Palestinian is injured.
31	Shooting	0	1	Gaza Strip	A Palestinian is injured when Israeli troops open fire on a group of Palestinians collecting scrap metal near the border.
31	Rocket attack	0	0	Israel	A Grad rocket landed near a residential neighborhood in the city of Netivot. The explosion disrupted a wedding in the vicinity of the landing site; four people suffered from shock, and damage was caused to a road and a parked car. Another Grad rocket exploded near the city of Ofakim a few minutes later, but no injuries or damage were reported.

== February ==
Date	Type	Dead	Injured	Location	Details
2	Airstrike	0	0	Gaza Strip	Israeli war planes bomb a target in the Gaza Strip. Israel states the target was a smuggling tunnel.
4	Riot control	0	Many	(Palestinian Authority) West Bank	Palestinians protesting against the Israeli West Bank barrier are fired upon with tear gas, rubber-coated bullets, and live ammunition in multiple towns; Nil'in, Bil'in, Wadi Rahal, al-Ma'sara, and al-Nabi Saleh.
5	Shooting	0	2	Gaza Strip	Two Palestinians are shot by Israeli forces while they gathered gravel from destroyed homes in Gaza.
5	Shooting	0	1	Gaza Strip	Palestinian workers are shot at by Israeli forces, injuring one, while they collected gravel in the northern Gaza Strip.
8	Airstrike	0	8	Gaza Strip	Israeli warplanes bomb a Health Ministry medicine warehouse and a field in the Gaza Strip, injuring eight people. The IDF say that they bombed a tunnel and two "terror activity centres" in response to Palestinian rocket attacks and that there were secondary explosions at two of the targets.
9	Demolition of homes	0	0	(Palestinian Authority) West Bank	Israel destroys Palestinian tents and barracks, built without a permit from Israel, near Nablus. A range of "8 families" to "180 Palestinians" has been given as previously living there.
11	Clash	1	2	Jerusalem	Hussam al-Rweidi was stabbed to death and two other Palestinians are injured, during a clash with Israelis in west Jerusalem.
11	Clash	0	Dozens	Jerusalem	Local youths and Israeli forces clash during protests in Silwan. Dozens of Palestinians injured after the Israelis fire gas bombs and rubber-coated bullets.
13	Shooting	0	2	Gaza Strip	Two Palestinians are shot and wounded by Israeli forces as they collected rubble in the northern Gaza Strip.
14	Shooting	0	1	Gaza Strip	Suleiman Abu Rkab, a Palestinian, is shot and wounded by Israeli forces while he worked near the northern border with Israel.
15	Shooting	0	1	(Palestinian Authority) West Bank	Wael Mahmoud Ayed, a 17-year-old Palestinian is shot in the abdomen by Israeli settlers while he farmed his land.
16	Unexploded ordnance	0	2	Gaza Strip	Two Palestinians are injured after a previously unexploded Israeli ordnance explodes.
17	Shooting	0	2	Gaza Strip	Two Palestinians are shot in their legs by Israeli forces while collecting stone aggregates, with Israel stating that the workers violated the buffer zone at the border.
17	Shooting	3	0	Gaza Strip	Three Palestinians are shot and killed by Israeli forces. The Democratic Front for the Liberation of Palestine has stated that one of those killed was a member of the organisation, killed "during a mission carried out by our military wing." Other sources describe the three men as fishermen.
19	Rocket attack	0	0	Israel	A projectile is fired from the Gaza Strip into Eshkol Regional Council, no damage or casualties are reported.
19	Anti-protest attack	0	2	(Palestinian Authority) West Bank	Israeli forces fire gas agents, live ammunition, and rubber-coated bullets against Palestinian protesters in Beit Ummar, with the mayor being shot in his leg, and a child injured from a concussive grenade.
21	Property attack	0	0	(Palestinian Authority) West Bank	Israeli settlers destroy between 220 and 270 Palestinian olive trees near Nablus.
22	Property attack	0	0	(Palestinian Authority) West Bank	The Israeli army destroy 230 Palestinian olive trees near Bethlehem.
22	Shooting	0	1	Gaza Strip	The Israeli army shoots a Palestinian worker while he worked near the border with Israel.
22	Explosives disarmed	0	0	Gaza Strip	Two improvised explosive devices are found near the Gaza Strip border with Israel and are destroyed by Israeli soldiers.
23	Improvised explosive device	0	0	Gaza Strip	An Improvised Explosive Device is detonated at the Gaza border, targeting Israeli soldiers.`
23	Mortar/missile attacks	1	11	Israel	Seven projectiles are fired from the Gaza Strip. One is fired at an Israel Defense Forces position, and the other six are fired at civilians. One hits a building in Beersheba. Israeli forces return fire, killing one militant and injuring several other Palestinians, at least six of whom are militants. Hamas and Palestinian Islamic Jihad both say that they fired mortars.
23	Shooting	0	2	Gaza Strip	Two Palestinians are shot by Israeli troops as they collected material for concrete in the Gaza Strip.
23	Airstrike	0	2	Gaza Strip	The Israeli Air Force targets a squad of militants who launched Grad rockets into a residential area in Beersheba. A "direct hit" was confirmed.
24	Airstrike	1	6	Gaza Strip	In a joint Israel Defense Forces-Shin Bet operation, the Israel Air Force uses an unmanned aerial vehicle to target militants in a pick-up truck along the Gaza-Egypt border. The missile was launched at the vehicle when it was near smuggling tunnels in Rafah, killing one militant and wounding six, in response to rocket fire on Israeli civilians. Palestinian sources however state that the vehicle occupants escaped and that four nearby civilians were injured in the Israeli attack.
25	Airstrike			Gaza Strip	The Israel Air Force target several sites in the Gaza Strip.
25	Riot			(Palestinian Authority) West Bank	About seventy Palestinians turn violent during a demonstration, attacking IDF soldiers and Israeli Border Police with rocks in Bil'in, West Bank. They also damage the West Bank barrier.
26	Airstrike	0	2	Gaza Strip	The Israeli Air Force bombs four sites in the Gaza Strip, including a Hamas guard post. One man is injured, as well as a seven-month-old girl, whose injury was "slight".
28	Thwarted Attack			Gaza Strip	The Israel Defense Forces thwarts an attempted attack on Israeli soldiers near the Gaza-Israel border. Troops spot several militants attempting to plant explosives and open fire on them, confirming a hit.

== March ==
Date	Type	Dead	Injured	Location	Details
01	Thwarted Attack			Gaza Strip	An anti-tank missile is launched at an Israeli Merkava tank during a routine patrol in the southern Gaza Strip. The tank's Trophy defense system destroys the missile before it hits the tank. Israeli forces return fire and confirm a hit.
06	Airstrikes	0	0	Gaza Strip	In response to a rocket barrage against Israeli towns by Islamic militants, the Israeli Air Force launches airstrikes on tunnels and militant training camps in the Gaza Strip. Secondary explosions occurred in the tunnel.
08	Weapons Seized	0	0	(Palestinian Authority) West Bank	Israeli Border Police discover five pipe-bombs, three Molotov cocktails, and a knife on a Palestinian militant at a checkpoint in Tabuach.
11	Riots	0	0	(Palestinian Authority) West Bank	Groups of rioters, including at least one anarchist group, attack Israeli troops in Ni'lin and other areas in the West Bank. Two rioters are arrested.
11	Rocket Attack	0	0	Israel	A Qassam rocket is launched from the Gaza Strip into Hof Ashkelon Regional Council in southern Israel. The rocket explodes in an agricultural field. Due to the Red Color early-warning system, civilians were in bunkers when the rocket detonated, and there were no injuries.
11	Stabbing	5	0	(Palestinian Authority) West Bank	Itamar killings - Two Palestinians infiltrate the Israeli settlement of Itamar and kill five members of an Israeli family, including three children.
16	Airstrike	3	4	Gaza Strip	The Israeli Air Force fires two missiles a Hamas security compound in the central Gaza Strip, in response to mortars fired at Israeli towns. Three militants are killed, and four are injured.
18	Anti-Tank Attack	0	0	Israel	An anti-tank missile is fired at Israeli forces during routine activity near the border fence in the southern Gaza Strip.
19	Mortar Attacks	0	2	Israel	On Sabbath, and the first day of the Jewish holiday of Purim, fifty-four mortars are fired from the Gaza Strip at communities in southern Israel. The mortars, which are the same type as the mortars discovered on a captured Iranian ship, are launched in several barrages. Two Israeli civilians are lightly injured by shrapnel from the mortars. Most civilians make it to protected areas. Hamas claims responsibility for the attacks.
19	Airstrikes & Shelling	1	5	Gaza Strip	In response to attacks on civilians in southern Israel, Israeli Army tanks and Israeli Air Force helicopters attack several areas in the Gaza Strip, including Khan Yunis, Dir al-Balah, and the Sajaiyeh neighbourhood. There were two injuries when a Hamas base in the southern Gaza Strip was hit by an airstrike.
21	Stabbing	0	1	(Palestinian Authority) West Bank	Palestinians stated that a 25-year-old Palestinian man from Hirbet Tuba was stabbed by a masked man, apparently Jewish, who fled the scene. Israel Police were investigating, and suspected the attack was nationalistically motivated.
21	Shooting	0	2	(Palestinian Authority) West Bank	Palestinians stone moving vehicles in the vicinity of Beit Ummar. Palestinians state that one driver, an Israeli, returns fire. Two men are lightly wounded.
21	Airstrike	0	18	Gaza Strip	Eighteen are injured in an Israeli airstrike on what Israel claimed was a smuggling tunnel.
22	Mortar or tank shelling	4	"dozens"	Gaza Strip	Palestinian militants operating near the town of Sajaya in the northern Gaza Strip fired mortar shells at Israel Defense Forces troops across the border. The troops returned mortar fire, killing four civilians in the town. Israel said the killings were accidental and opened an investigation, but stressed that responsibility lay on Hamas for choosing to operate in populated areas.
22	Air strike	4	0	Gaza Strip	Four Islamic Jihad militants are killed by a missile fired from an Israeli aircraft. Israel states that the men were on their way to launch a rocket toward Israel.
22	Planted explosive	1	30+	Jerusalem	2011 Jerusalem bus stop bombing - A bomb placed in a phone booth at a bus stop is detonated, killing a British national and injuring 39 people.
25	Stoning	0	2	(Palestinian Authority) West Bank	A Palestinian man attacks an Israel Defense Forces soldier in the head with a rock and attempts to snatch his weapon. Israel Police officers shoot the assailant in the leg. Both men are moderately injured and evacuated by Israeli helicopter to Hadassah Ein Kerem Hospital in Jerusalem.
25	Airstrike	0	1	Gaza Strip	An Israeli airstrike on Gaza City injures one Palestinian.
26	Vehicle stoning	0	1	(Palestinian Authority) West Bank	A vehicle driven by an Israeli woman was stoned near Qalqilya. The driver was injured.
26	Missile strike	0	3	(Palestinian Authority) West Bank	Three Palestinians are injured during protests in the West Bank with Israeli troops firing rubber-coated steel bullets and using sound-bombs against protesters.
27	Missile strike	2	1	Gaza Strip	An Israeli missile attack killed two member of the Al Quds Brigades, and injures a civilian.
30	Missile strike	1	1	Gaza Strip	An Israeli missile attack killed a member of the Al Quds Brigades, and injures a civilian.

== April ==
Date	Type	Dead	Injured	Location	Details
02	Air strike	3	2	Gaza Strip	Three Hamas militants of the Al Qassam Brigades, the group's military wing, are killed in an Israeli air strike. A pro-Palestinian website states that two additional "residents" are injured, but a CNN article on the incident does not mention casualties other than the Hamas militants.
04	Shooting	1	0	(Palestinian Authority) West Bank	Israeli Arab director Juliano Mer-Khamis is gunned down in the Palestinian city of Ramallah. The prime suspect is a Hamas member.
07	Anti-tank fire, rocket and mortar attacks; Airstrikes	1	1	(Israel) Negev and Gaza Strip	Hamas fires a Kornet anti-tank missile at an Israeli school bus, critically wounding Daniel Viflic, a teenage boy on his way home from school, and lightly injuring the driver of the bus. The boy died ten days later. Palestinians continue to fire projectiles at Israel throughout the afternoon. One rocket was intercepted over Ashkelon by an Iron Dome battery. Israel responds with airstrikes, hitting two rocket firing cells.
08	Rocket and mortar attacks; Airstrikes	2	0	Israel and Gaza Strip	Despite the announcement by Palestinian militants in Gaza of a unilateral ceasefire at 11 pm the previous night, at least 24 mortar shells and 6 rockets are fired into Israel, causing serious damage to a factory and to chicken coops. Israel responds with airstrikes, killing four Hamas militants and one Popular Resistance Committees militant.
08	Rocket and mortar attacks; Airstrikes and artillery	3	0	Israel and Gaza Strip	Palestinian militants in the Gaza Strip fire over 65 missiles, rockets and mortars at Israel, damaging homes. Five people are injured while fleeing to bomb shelters. Israel responds with airstrikes and artillery. According to Palestinian sources, several Hamas militants and one from the Popular Resistance Committees, as well as several civilians are killed.
14	Hanging	1	0	Gaza Strip	Italian International Solidarity Movement (ISM) volunteer Vittorio Arrigoni was abducted and executed by hanging in Gaza by a Palestinian anti-Hamas militant group.
16	Vehicle stoning	0	1	Jerusalem	A Jewish driver is injured when stone throwers target him in the Arab neighborhood of Silwan.
24	Shooting	1	3	(Palestine) Near Nablus	Palestinian Authority policemen open fire on a convoy of religious Israelis praying at Joseph's Tomb without permission. One man was killed.

== May ==
Date	Type	Dead	Injured	Location	Details
02	Stonings	0	0	Jerusalem	Palestinian residents of Silwan in Jerusalem, rallying in support of Osama bin Laden and against his assassination by the United States, threw stones at Israel Police officers. Police responded with crowd dispersal means. No injuries or arrests were reported.

== June ==
Date	Type	Dead	Injured	Location	Details
15	Stabbings	0	1	(Israel) Netanya	An Israeli man was arrested in Netanya for stabbing a Palestinian construction worker twice in the chest. Shin Bet security service were dispatched to investigate the case.

== August ==
Date	Type	Dead	Injured	Location	Details
18	Shooting, bombings, rocket attack, suicide bombing	8	40	(Israel) Highway 12	Palestinian militants infiltrated into Southern Israel and attacked civilian vehicles and Israeli security forces. Eight people, including six civilians, were killed and forty injured. Among the dead was an Israeli soldier killed by friendly fire. Ten attackers were killed, including two by Egyptian soldiers. Five Egyptian security personnel were also killed by Israeli forces as they pursued the attackers into the Sinai.
18	Air strike	6	0	Gaza Strip	Israel launched an airstrike against a building used by the Popular Resistance Committees, which it accused of carrying out the attacks. Five of the organization's high-ranking members and a child were killed. The Israeli government claimed that it was in retaliation to the attacks in southern Israel. This led to Hamas breaking a truce with Israel it had held since 2009.
20	Rocket attack	1	9	(Israel) Beersheba	Several rockets fired from the Gaza Strip hit Beersheba.
29	Vehicle rampage and stabbings	0	7	(Israel) Tel Aviv	A Nablus resident stole a taxi cab after stabbing the driver in the arm and rammed a Border Police checkpoint outside a nightclub, then exited the vehicle and managed to stab a few bystanders before being subdued by police. Four civilians and four police officers were injured.

== September ==
Date	Type	Dead	Injured	Location	Details
23	Vehicle stoning	2	0	(Palestine) Near Hebron	Palestinians stoned an Israeli car near Kiryat Arba, causing it to turn over. An Israeli man and his 1-year-old son were killed.

== October ==
Date	Type	Dead	Injured	Location	Details
29	Rocket attack	1	1+	(Israel) Ashkelon	One Palestinian rocket hit an apartment building in Ashkelon, killing a 56-year-old man.

== See also ==
- List of armed conflicts and attacks, 2011
- List of Palestinian rocket attacks on Israel, 2011
- List of Israeli assassinations
