= 2002 Itamar attack =

2002 murder of an Israeli family in their home

Itamar attack (2002)
- Part of the Second Intifada
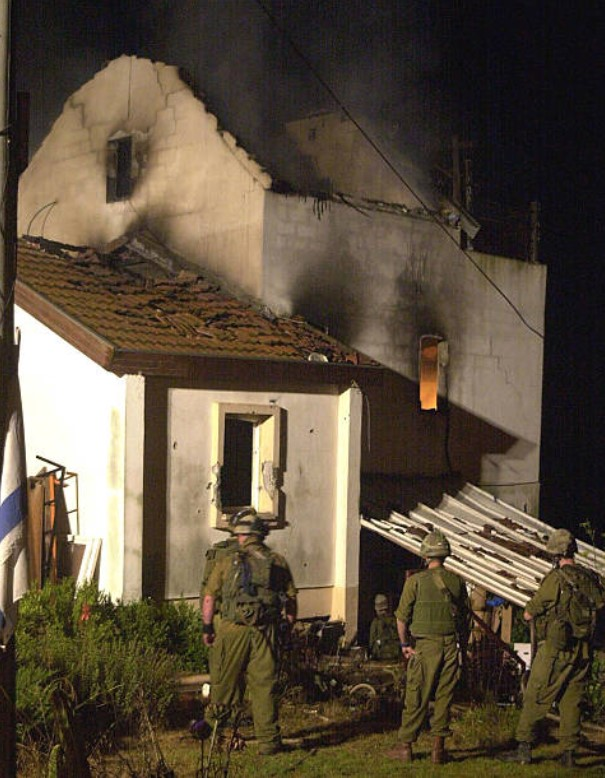
- The attack aftermath

- The attack site
- Native name: הפיגוע באיתמר (2002)
- Location: 32°10′27″N 35°18′30″E; Itamar, West Bank, (Area C)
- Date: 20 June 2002; 24 years ago c.21:00 pm(GMT+2)
- Attack type: Mass shooting
- Weapon: Rifle
- Deaths: 5 civilians (including 3 children) & 2 attackers
- Injuries: 10 civilians (including 2 children)
- Perpetrator: PFLP claimed responsibility

The Itamar attack was an attack that took place on Thursday night of 20 June 2002 around 21:00 in which two Palestinian terrorists broke into a civilian house in the Israeli settlement of Itamar in the West Bank, killing the Shabo family, murdering a mother and her three sons, while injuring two children. Later on the militants also killed the commander of the rescue squad during his attempt to free civilians trapped in the house. The two gunmen were killed and eight Israelis were wounded when soldiers stormed the house. This was the second attack on Itamar in less than a month. The Popular Front for the Liberation of Palestine claimed responsibility for the attack.

== The attack ==
The terrorists arrived at Itamar shortly after 21:00 and started shooting in all directions. They then broke into a civilian home, and murdered a mother Rachel Shabo (age 40) and her three children: Neria Shabo (age 15), Zvika Shabo (age 12) and Avishai Shabo (age 5). One of the militants shot and seriously injured Asahel (age 10) and Avia (age 13).

The settlements' security unit was alerted to the site as soon as they heard the gunfire. The security unit was the first team to exchange fire with the militants and the first team that attempted to rescue the civilians trapped in the house. Yosef Twito (age 31), father of five, who commanded the security squad, was killed attempting to rescue civilians trapped in the house by the Palestinian terrorists who barricaded themselves in the house. Later on, many IDF and Border Police forces surrounded the house and exchanged fire with the militants. Yamas forces arrived at the site as well, and began preparing to break into the house. An hour later the soldiers broke into the house. During a firefight one of the terrorists was killed. The second terrorist attempted to flee the house through a window but was killed after a brief battle in a nearby house.

During the takeover, eight Israelis were injured and the house burst into flames. Ambulances carrying the wounded were delayed by roadblocks and pelted with stones.

The father of the family, Boaz, was not injured in the attack, nor were two of the children, Yariv and Ataya. The Popular Front for the Liberation of Palestine claimed responsibility for the attack.

== See also ==
- Itamar attack (2011)
- List of massacres in Palestinian Territories
