= Murder of the Fogel family =

Palestinian attack on an Israeli family in the West Bank

Itamar massacre
- The victims of the attack. (Clockwise, from top left:) Ruth Fogel (35), Udi Fogel (36), Hadas (3 months), Yoav (11), Elad (4)

- The attack site
- Location: 32°10′27″N 35°18′30″E; Itamar, West Bank, (Area C)
- Date: 11 March 2011; 15 years ago Midnight (GMT+2)
- Attack type: Stabbing/shooting attack
- Weapons: Knife; M16 rifle
- Deaths: 5 Israeli civilians (including 3 children)
- Perpetrators: Amjad Awad; Hakim Awad

The Itamar attack, also called the Itamar massacre, was a terrorist attack on an Israeli family in the Israeli settlement of Itamar in the West Bank that took place on 11 March 2011, in which five members of the same family were murdered in their beds. The victims were the father Ehud (Udi) Fogel, the mother Ruth Fogel, and three of their six children—Yoav, 11, Elad, 4, and Hadas, the youngest, a three-month-old infant. The infant was decapitated. The settlement of Itamar had been the target of several murderous attacks before these killings.

Amjad Awad and Hakim Awad, two young Palestinian cousins from the village of Awarta, were arrested for the murders. On 5 June 2011 the two men were indicted on five counts of murder, stealing weapons, breaking and entering, and conspiracy to commit a crime. Both were later convicted. They initially denied any involvement in the attack but later proudly confessed to the murders, expressing no remorse and reenacting the attack before security officials.

The attack was harshly condemned by the United Nations, the Quartet on the Middle East, France, Germany, the United Kingdom, the United States, and many other governments, as well as the Palestinian Authority and a number of non-governmental organizations. Xinhua, the official press agency of the People's Republic of China, stated that the attack was praised by the Palestinian Islamic Jihad. The Al-Aqsa Martyrs' Brigades, who self-identifies as the military wing of Fatah, stated that "the heroic operation is a natural response to the (Israeli) occupation crimes against our people in West Bank and Gaza Strip." An opinion poll indicated that 63% of Palestinians opposed and about one-third supported the attack. One of the perpetrators of the murders was described as a "hero" and a "legend" by members of his family, during a weekly program. Itamar and its outposts are known as a particularly violent against their Palestinian neighbours.

== Background ==
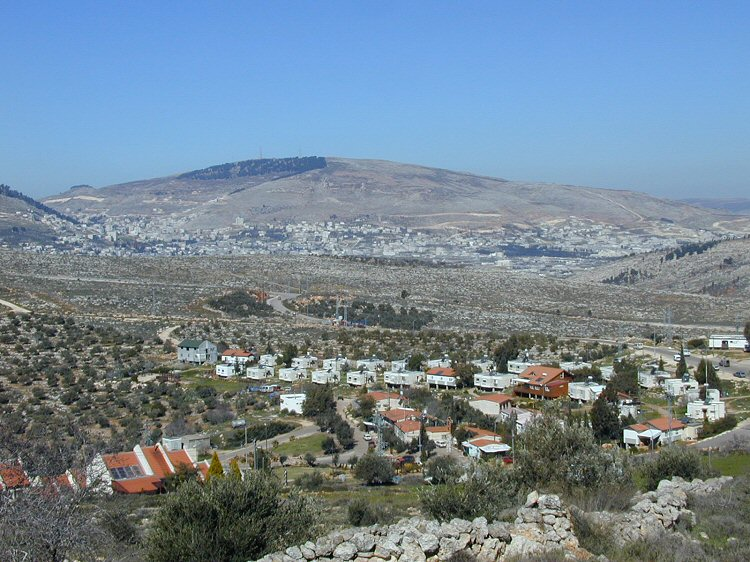
Itamar in 2007

Due to an increase in security measures by the Palestinian National Authority, operations by Palestinian militant organizations in the West Bank had been declining. Over the previous two years, Israel had removed a number of roadblocks and checkpoints, although a security fence remained in place around Itamar. The terrorist attack was the first to kill Israeli settlers since a drive-by shooting in August 2010 left four dead near Kiryat Arba. Attacks on Jewish settlers in the West Bank had been defended by some Palestinian militants on previous occasions, describing them as combatants in the conflict rather than civilians.

Itamar, with a population of 1,032 (2009) had seen numerous confrontations between Israelis and Palestinians. Tensions between Itamar and the nearby Palestinian village of Awarta had been rising before the attack. Palestinians had accused settlers of cutting down olive trees, burning cars and shooting at Palestinian residents. Ten Palestinians and one Israeli were injured in a confrontation in the week before the attack, when Israeli soldiers were accused of using live fire to quell the clash.

== Perpetrators ==
The attack was carried out by cousins Amjad Mahmad Awad (18) and Hakim Mazen Awad (17). Hakim was a high school student whose father, Mazen, is active in the PFLP. Mazen had previously been arrested and tried by the Palestinian Authority and served a five-year prison sentence for murdering a female cousin and burning her body. His uncle Jibril was a PFLP militant who had participated in a 2002 attack against Itamar which left four civilians dead, including three children, along with the settlement's security officer, and was killed in a 2003 clash with Israeli troops.

Amjad Mahmad Awad was affiliated with the PFLP. He had been employed in Israel as a laborer, and was a student at Al-Quds Open University. The families of the two suspects initially denied the two committed the massacre. Hakim's mother falsely claimed her son had been at home the night of the murders and never left the house, saying that "five months ago Hakim underwent a surgery in his stomach and I'm sure he was tortured and forced into confessing". She later, however, acknowledged his involvement. Amjad's family claimed he had been in the village at the time of the Itamar murders. One relative said Hakim and Amjad did not know each other, as "one went to university, the other is in high school". He also claimed that if they had been guilty, they would have been captured within days, as "the whole world knows about Israel's advanced investigation abilities and its use of sophisticated means". Amjad and Hakim Awad had decided to carry out an attack on Itamar days before. Three days before the killings, they approached a PFLP member with a request for weapons, but were rebuffed. At midday on Friday, 11 March, they decided that they would enter Itamar later that night, and carry out an attack armed with knives.

Several media sources, among them The Guardian and The Washington Post, first reported that the Al-Aqsa Martyrs Brigades, the armed wing of Fatah, the dominant political faction in the West Bank, claimed responsibility for the attack, whereas The Jerusalem Post reported, that the "Al Aqsa Martyrs Brigades of Imad Mughniyeh" had claimed responsibility, a group named after a Hezbollah chief of military operations and liaison with the Iranian Revolutionary Guards who was killed by a car bomb in Damascus in 2008. According to Al Hayat, officials of "Al Aqsa Martyrs Brigades" denied association with the Imad Mughniyeh-group or the attack.

Amjad and Hakim Awad were already in custody when they were identified as the killers, and their names released to the public on 17 April. They offered a detailed account of the attack, as well as a reenactment. Despite the ties of both suspects to the PFLP, Shin Bet investigators did not identify the attack as being carried out under the auspices of the PFLP, but rather as an individual act. Israeli authorities said that they planned their attack well ahead of time, and showed no remorse for their actions.

== The attack ==
According to Israeli investigators, Amjad and Hakim Awad had attempted to acquire weapons from a Popular Front militant in Awarta. After he refused, they decided to carry out the attack using knives. Just after 9 pm on Friday night, the two left Awarta carrying several knives, an umbrella, and wire-cutting shears. The two tried to cut through Itamar's security fence, but eventually climbed over it. An initial probe showed that the fence around Itamar had functioned properly. At about the same time that they infiltrated, an alarm sounded in the settlement's security room, indicating the exact location where they entered. But neither Itamar's civilian security team nor the civilian security officer, who went to the site of the disturbance and found nothing out of order, informed soldiers patrolling the area of the fence, concluding that an animal had set off the alarm, although procedures prescribe that the IDF is to be informed of any alarm.

After breaching the fence, Amjad and Hakim walked 400 meters into the settlement. The perpetrators first broke into a house of the Chai family who were on vacation, searching all the rooms. They stole an M16 assault rifle, ammunition, a helmet, and a kevlar vest. They waited an hour and entered the Fogels' house at around 10:30 pm. According to the indictment, the two entered the children's room, told eleven-year-old Yoav, who had been awakened by their entry not to be afraid, then took him to a nearby room, slashed his throat, and stabbed him in the chest. Hakim Awad then strangled four-year-old Elad with Amjad Awad stabbing him twice in the chest. The two next entered the parents' room, and turned on the light, waking them up. The parents then struggled with the attackers. Ehud Fogel was repeatedly stabbed in the neck, and Ruth Fogel was stabbed in the neck and back and then shot when the suspects saw that she was not dead. The suspects then left the house. According to their confessions, they feared that the shots had been heard. When they went outside, they saw a patrol vehicle, but realized that they had not been discovered when it did nothing. The two then argued over whether to withdraw or carry out attacks in other homes, with Hakim insisting that they return immediately to Awarta, and Amjad arguing that they should return to the home and steal another weapon. Amjad then re-entered the Fogel home. When 3-month-old Hadas began crying, Amjad stabbed her, fearing the cries would attract attention. According to several accounts, the infant was decapitated or nearly decapitated. The attackers did not notice two other children asleep in the house at the time. In their confessions they claimed they would not have hesitated to kill them, had they noticed them. The perpetrators also stole Ehud's M16 rifle. They left Itamar without being detected.

The Awad cousins returned to Awarta on foot, and appealed to Hakim's uncle, PFLP militant Salah Awad, for assistance, and gave him a detailed description of the attack. Salah helped them conceal their stolen weapons and burn their bloodstained clothes, and later transferred the stolen weapons to Jad Avid, a contact in Ramallah, for hiding.

The bodies were discovered by Tamar Fogel, the 12-year-old daughter of the family who arrived home around midnight after a youth outing. After finding that the door was locked, she asked her neighbor, Rabbi Ya'akov Cohen, for help. He noticed tracks and mud near the house, and brought a weapon with him. The two then woke the sleeping 6-year-old boy by calling through the window, and he opened the door, after which Cohen returned to his home. When the girl discovered the murders, she ran outside screaming, and the Rabbi ran back, firing several shots into the air to alert security personnel. Rabbi Cohen, who later entered the house with the girl, said that her two-year-old brother "was lying next to his bleeding parents, shaking them with his hands and trying to get them to wake up, while crying... The sight in the house was shocking." Magen David Adom paramedics and ZAKA (Disaster Victim Identification) volunteers were called to the scene, including ZAKA regional commander Gil Bismot. Paramedics followed a trail of toys and blood to the bedroom, where they discovered the first three bodies: the mother, father and infant. In the next room they found the body of the 11-year-old sibling. Finally they reached the last bedroom, where the 4-year-old boy was severely injured and dying. The toddler died of his wounds despite the efforts of medical personnel.

In accordance with Jewish law, the bodies remained in the home throughout Jewish Sabbath, watched over by ZAKA volunteers. Immediately after the end of Sabbath, another team of ZAKA volunteers arrived from Immanuel and the wider region were dispatched to Itamar. ZAKA volunteers collected all human remains and cleaned up the scene. Dr. Yehuda Hiss of the Abu Kabir Forensic Institute in Tel Aviv traveled to Itamar to carry out an examination of the bodies. The procedure was supervised by the head of the ZAKA Rabbinical Council, Rabbi Ya'akov Roget.

== Victims ==
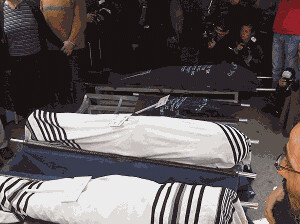
Bodies wrapped in tallit at funeral in Givat Shaul

The victims of the attack are Ehud "Udi" Fogel, age 36, the son of Gush Emunim activists from Neve Tzuf, Ruth Fogel, age 35, the daughter of a Jerusalem rabbi, and three of their six children, Yoav, age 11, Elad, age 4, and three-month-old Hadas.

The Fogel family had recently settled in Itamar. They previously lived in the Gush Katif settlement of Netzarim in the Gaza Strip. After Israel evacuated its Gaza settlements in 2005, they moved to the settlement of Ariel, and in 2009 to Itamar, where Udi Fogel worked as teacher at the post-high school yeshiva. Three of the family's children, Tamar, Roi and Yishai, survived, physically unharmed. They were taken in by grandparents in the aftermath of the attack. Twelve-year-old Tamar is quoted as having promised her relatives: "I will be strong and succeed in overcoming this. I understand the task that stands before me, and I will be a mother to my siblings."

== Funeral ==
The funeral of the five victims on Sunday, 13 March at Har HaMenuchot Cemetery in Givat Shaul, Jerusalem, was attended by some 20,000 people and broadcast on Israeli television. Speakers included former Chief Rabbi Yisrael Meir Lau, quoted as saying: "We will not bend, we will not give up, we returned to the land of our fathers and it is our home, and the children shall return within their borders and nothing will prevent our faith in the righteousness of our path", Ashkenazi Chief Rabbi Yona Metzger, who, linking the murderers to Amalek, stated that "Itamar needs to become a major city in Israel as a response to this murder", and Knesset Speaker Reuven Rivlin, whose final remarks were: "Build more, live more, more footholds – that is our response to the murderers so that they know – they can't defeat us".

Ruth Fogel's father was quoted as having said: "Our children are prepared to be sacrificed as an offering at the altar we have to continue to build to bring redemption. Udi and Ruthie wanted this redemption."

Udi Fogel's brother Motti Fogel spoke out against the use that has been made of the murder of the family: "All the slogans about Torah and settlement, the Land of Israel and the people of Israel are attempts to forget the simple and pain-torn fact: you are dead. You are dead, and no slogan will bring you back. You are not a symbol or a national event. Your life was a purpose in and of itself, and it should be forbidden for your terrible death to turn your life into some sort of tool."

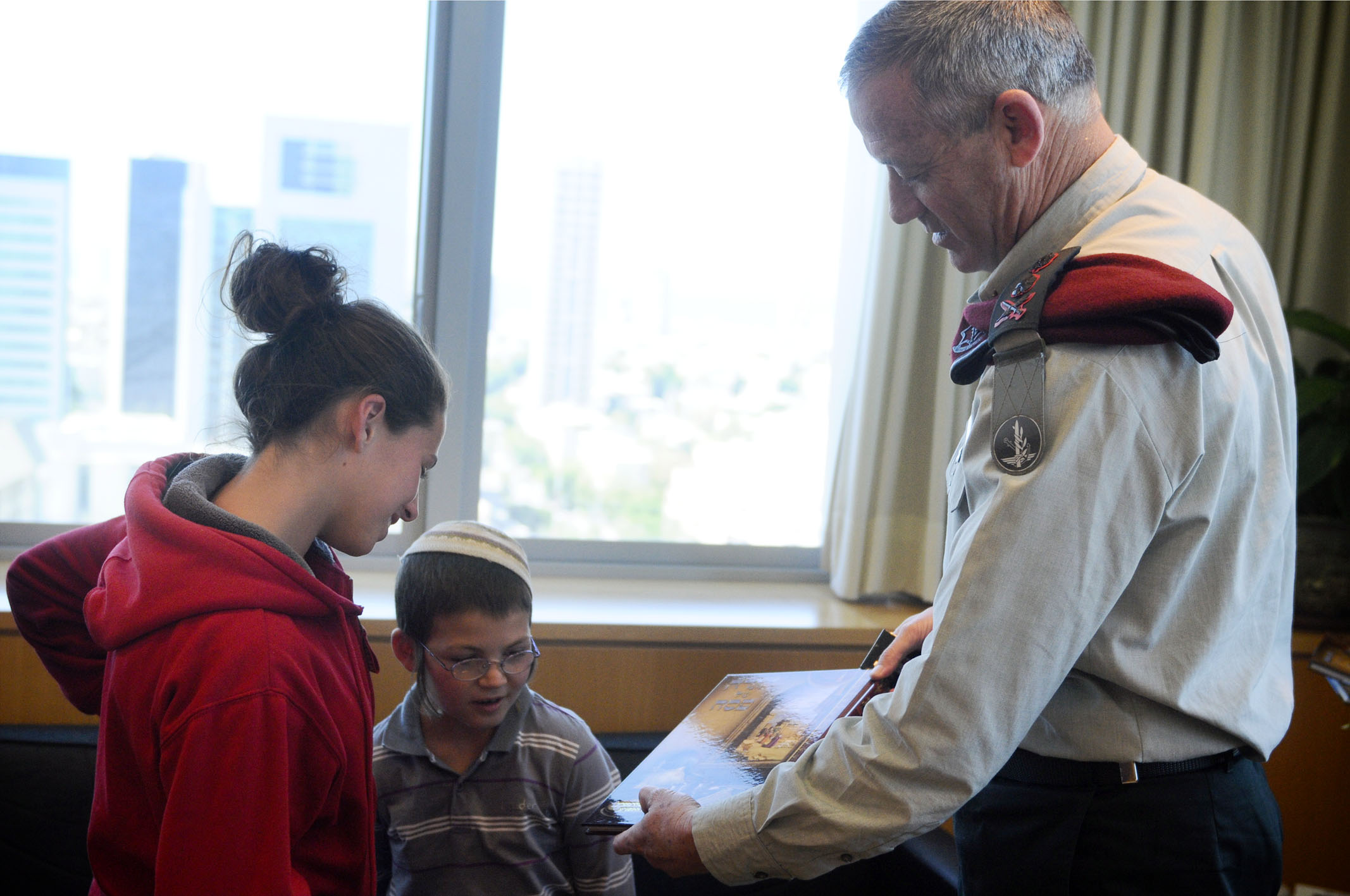
Fogel family children meet With IDF Chief of Staff

Following the end of the 30-day mourning period, an emotional memorial service was held in Itamar, where the cornerstone for a new kollel to be named after Udi Fogel was laid. Hundreds of people attended, including Sephardi Chief Rabbi Moshe Amar, Knesset members Tzipi Hotovely (Likud) and Uri Ariel (National Union), and Yesha Council Chairman Danny Dayan. Many participants signed a Megillah scroll, which was recited by former Military Rabbinate Chief and Yeshiva head Avichai Rontzki before being placed within the foundations of the new kollel.

== Manhunt and capture ==
Following the attack, soldiers from the Israel Defense Forces (IDF) and Israel Police arrived in Itamar and conducted a search across the village of Itamar. The Israeli Air Force used UAVs for aerial surveillance of the area. Israeli authorities declared the nearby West Bank city of Nablus a closed military zone. Israeli troops set up checkpoints on the roads leading to the city and prevented vehicles and pedestrians from leaving or entering, according to Palestinians. Residential areas were placed under curfew, and Israeli troops conducted house-to-house searches. The previously-dismantled Huwwara Checkpoint was re-established.

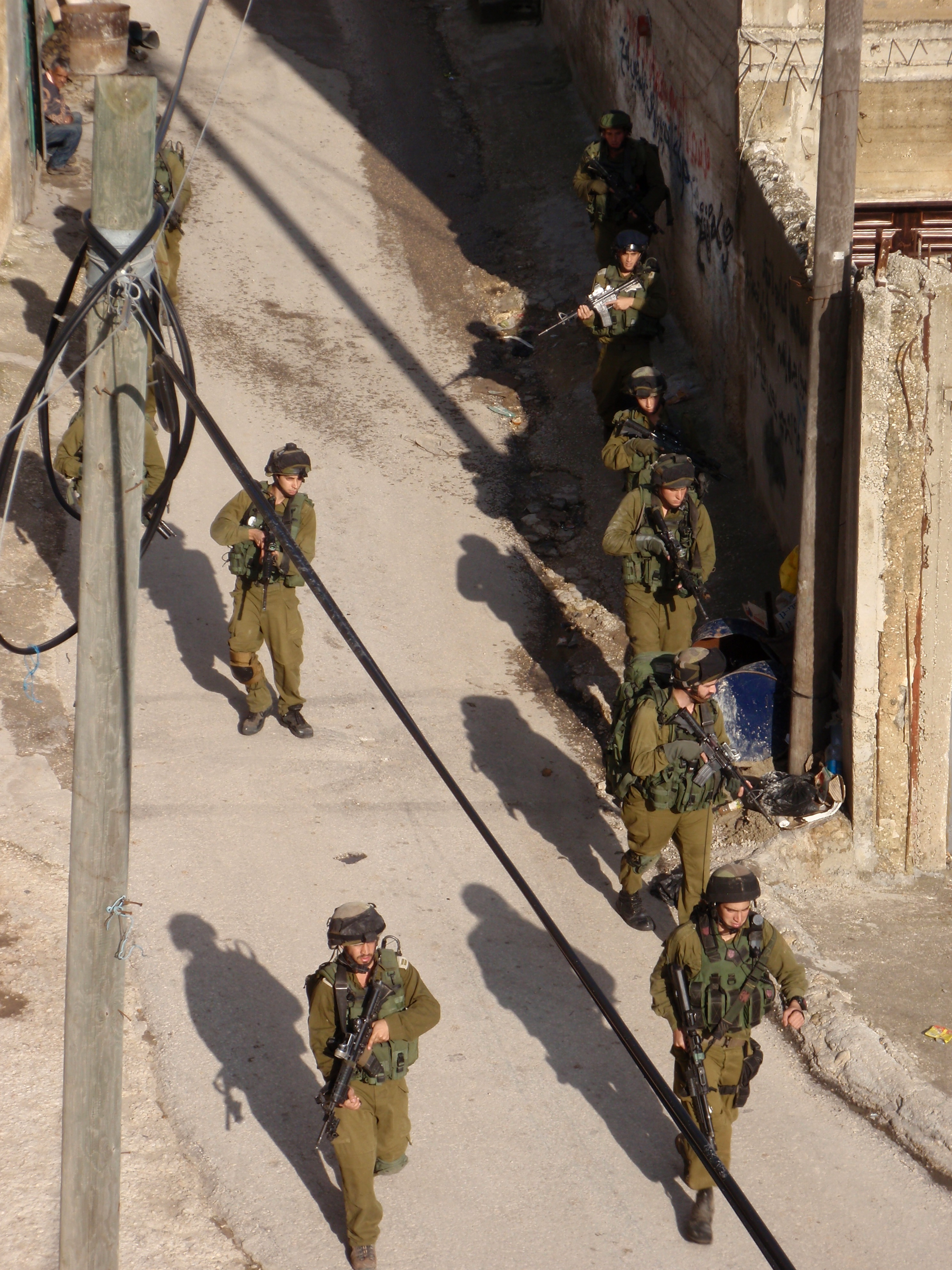
Israeli patrol in Awarta the day after the attack

An initial probe suggested two perpetrators entered Itamar shortly after 9 pm, jumping over the settlement's security fence, and remained in the settlement for three hours without being noticed. Due to the characteristics of the killings, the IDF estimated that the attack was not carried out by an organized terrorist infrastructure but was the work of one or two people, presumably Palestinian. Israeli authorities initially suspected that the killings may have been in revenge for the killing of two Palestinian teenagers from Awarta, who were shot dead near Itamar in 2010.

In Itamar, the Fogel family home was cordoned off by red tape and guarded by soldiers. A forensics team probed the home, collecting evidence left behind by the killers.

An IDF tracker spotted indications that the perpetrators had scaled the fence, and found footprints and equipment abandoned by the killers leading out of Itamar. The tracker, accompanied by an IDF force, followed the tracks to the Palestinian village of Awarta. IDF troops entered the town of Burqa, northwest of Nablus, searching houses and questioning residents. They did not make any arrests. IDF soldiers and Israel Border Police gendarmes also entered the villages of Sanur and Zababdeh, arresting several dozen Palestinians.

A gag order was imposed on the investigation.

Awarta was placed under curfew and declared a closed military zone. IDF troops and Israel Border Police conducted mass arrests of residents throughout the following days. According to Palestinian sources, all men from Awarta were questioned. Residents reported constant door-to-door searches, with some homes being searched up to three times. According to witness reports, Israeli armored vehicles patrolled the village's streets, and troops were deployed on the hilltops around the village. The city of Nablus remained under closure, but four days after the murders, a food delivery was permitted into the city.

On 29 March 2011, the IDF initiated a second wave of arrests in Awarta, detaining 60 Palestinians, including the Deputy Mayor of Awarta, and collecting DNA samples. About 20 were immediately released following DNA testing, and another 40 were interrogated. A week later, AFP reported that the IDF arrested more than 100 women from the village, placing them in a camp where they were fingerprinted and DNA samples were taken, before most of them were released.

On 11 April, daily IDF raids continued in the village, and troops continued to maintain roadblocks at the entrance. According to allegations by Israeli leftists and Awarta residents, soldiers humiliated residents and damaged property. Palestinian officials claimed that Israel had seized land around the village to expand nearby settlements. The Palestinian Authority condemned the raids and called on the international community to pressure Israel into halting them.

Shin Bet questioned numerous Awarta villagers who had been arrested, with some residents who had been arrested and released being again questioned by Shin Bet investigators. Meanwhile, the IDF also questioned residents in various parts of Awarta. The interrogations produced various leads, but slowly, the circle of potential suspects was narrowed. At this stage, the IDF's elite Duvdevan Unit and the Israel Police's special undercover unit began making secret arrests of suspects, and interrogations of the suspects produced additional intelligence information. Hakim Awad was arrested on 5 April, but only started to cooperate after more information pointed to him. Amjad Awad was arrested on 10 April. Forensic evidence gathered from the Fogel family home linked them to the killings. The two were identified as the perpetrators, and kept in custody pending trial. On 17 April, it was officially cleared for publication that Amjad and Hakim Awad had been identified as the killers. Both suspects confessed to the killings and offered a detailed account. They expressed no remorse for their actions, and performed a reenactment of the attack before security officials. Amjad Awad declared that he was proud of what he did and had no regrets, even if he were to be sentenced to death.

Subsequently, Hakim's father, two uncles, and brother were arrested for hiding the murder weapons and suppressing additional evidence. Israeli security forces also arrested the PFLP militant who they had approached for weapons, and raided the Ramallah home of Yazed Hassan Mohammed Awad, Salah Awad's contact who had hidden the two stolen assault rifles following the attack. Both of the assault rifles were found in his home. In addition, Yazed Awad was found to have briefed Amjad and Hakim on Shin Bet interrogation techniques. He was arrested, and in December 2012 was convicted by a military court.

== Trial and conviction ==
On 26 May 2011, the Judea and Samaria Sector Military Court extended the remand of the two cousins for eleven days. The Military Prosecution informed the court that it would file an official indictment at their next arraignment. The Military Prosecution considered requesting the death penalty, due to the extreme nature of the attack. Prosecutors ultimately did not request the death penalty.

On 5 June 2011, Amjad and Hakim Awad were indicted before the Judea and Samaria Sector Military Court on five counts of murder, stealing weapons, breaking and entering, and conspiracy to commit a crime. The suspects confessed to the murder and the military prosecution in the case presented forensic evidence linking them to the scene of the crime, including DNA samples and fingerprints. According to a senior Shin Bet official involved in the investigation, despite the suspects' young age, Hakim and Amjad "described what they did with self-control and did not express regret over their actions at any stage of the investigation." Amjad told reporters in the court "I don't regret what I did and I would do it again. I'm proud of what I did and I'll accept any punishment I get, even death, because I did it all for Palestine."

Hakim Awad was found guilty on five counts of murder in August 2011. He was also convicted for weapons-related and other security offenses. In September 2011 he was sentenced to five consecutive life sentences and another five years in prison. Prior to the sentencing Hakim Awad declared he was not sorry and claimed he carried out the attack "because of the occupation."

In October 2011, Amjad Awad pleaded guilty to five counts of murder. Before deciding whether to convict him, the judges examined the primary evidence. The judges had considered sentencing him to death, but decided not to impose a harsher sentence than what the prosecution had requested. On 16 January 2012, he was sentenced to five life terms and an additional seven years in prison.

== Responses ==
=== Israel ===
In response to the Itamar attack, on 13 March, the Israeli cabinet approved the construction of 500 housing units in Gush Etzion, Ma'ale Adumim, Ariel and Modi'in Illit, areas of the West Bank that Israel intends to keep under any permanent accord with the Palestinians. The decision was taken in a late-night cabinet meeting in which both Prime Minister Benjamin Netanyahu and Defense Minister Ehud Barak took part, after several alternatives, such as starting a new settlement or widening the settlement of Itamar, were rejected. The decision was criticized by the Palestinians and the United States. A spokesperson from the U.S. State Department told the Jewish Week that the "United States is deeply concerned by continuing Israeli actions with respect to settlements in the West Bank" and that "[c]ontinued Israeli settlements are illegitimate and run counter to efforts to resume direct negotiations."

Prime Minister Benjamin Netanyahu, visiting relatives of the victims, told the mourners: "They shoot and we build." Foreign Minister Avigdor Lieberman voiced his opposition to imposing the death penalty on the perpetrators, saying that Israel "should not be guided by revenge."

On 4 April 2011, a new bill was proposed by MK Yoel Hasson (Kadima) to keep murderers of children from being included in prisoner exchanges and allowing them to be pardoned by the President at any future date. In the aftermath of the attack, Israeli military and police forces were deployed near Nablus to prevent clashes.

According to Palestinian sources and the BBC, Israeli settlers vandalized property near Nablus, Hebron, Bethlehem and Ramallah in revenge for the Fogel murders. They also reportedly handed out threatening leaflets in Beitillu, near Ramallah, blocked a junction in Gush Etzion and threw stones at Palestinians. Several were arrested by IDF and police forces deployed on the scene. Israeli activists blocked an intersection near Psagot on Highway 60. According to the Palestinians, residents of Bat Ayin took part in a protest at which the Israeli police fired tear gas. Settlers near Nablus and Kedumim area reportedly stoned and burned Palestinian vehicles, and blocked the Jit Junction. Rabbi Yitzchak Ginsburgh, Rosh Yeshiva of the Od Yosef Chai Yeshiva in Yitzhar, is said to have called for houses in a nearby village to be demolished.

On 13 March, Israelis protested at the Horev, Tzabar, Megiddo, and Azrieli Junctions, carrying signs proclaiming "we are settlers too" and "peace isn't signed with blood." Drivers honked their car horns in solidarity. Activists protested near Jerusalem and Bar-Ilan University students held at rally near Highway 4, chanting "enough to violence and incitement – talk to humans not murderers".

On 14 March, 200 residents of Itamar marched from Itamar to Awarta. Fourteen marchers entered the village and threw stones at homes. IDF soldiers and Border Police gendarmes dispersed the rioters. Some marched up a hill near Itamar to support the construction of a new Israeli outpost there.

On 17 March, two Palestinian workers employed in Shilo were attacked by masked men armed with iron rods and pepper spray, as was an Israeli security guard who attempted to protect them.

An opinion poll conducted by the Harry S. Truman Research Institute for the Advancement of Peace and the Palestinian Center for Policy and Survey Research found, according to the groups, "In light of the attack in Itamar, 59% among Israelis oppose and 33% support the government policy to relax the security measures in the West Bank such as the removal of road blocks." The groups asked 601 adult Israelis interviewed by phone in Hebrew, Arabic, or Russian between 21 and 28 March 2011.

On 16 March, Haaretz reported that residents of Itamar were building a new outpost, unofficially named "Aryeh."

"Aryeh" is Hebrew for lion, as well as an approximate acronym for the names Udi, Ruth, Yoav, Elad and Hadas, the five victims of the attack. On 1 December, Aryeh was demolished by Israeli Civil Administration personnel backed by IDF troops and police officers. During the demolition operation, three permanent structures, two makeshift structures and a synagogue were razed. A control panel and the electricity system that powered a security camera purchased by the Shomron Regional Council were also destroyed, and a security official claimed that the electric system was illegal and was destroyed to protect Civil Administration personnel from being electrocuted. Settlers claimed that three Torah scrolls were confiscated.

In 2018, the three surviving children of the massacre and 19 additional family members filed a lawsuit against the terrorists convicted of the murders and the Palestinian Authority for abetting such attacks with the payment of stipends to convicted terrorists. The suit asked for NIS 400 million ($114 million) in damages. In an affidavit presented by the defendants in April 2021, the defendants admitted to making monthly "Pay-for-Slay" payments since 2011 to the seven members of the PFLP cell convicted and incarcerated for their participation in the Fogel murders.

=== Palestinians ===
Palestinian militants threw stones at buses returning from the funeral of the victims but some Palestinian residents of Awarta, who had previously clashed with settlers from Itamar, denounced the killings.

A paramedic interviewed in an Israeli newspaper stated that on the day of the attack, residents of Itamar saw fireworks and celebrations in nearby Palestinian communities. In the Gaza Strip, the killings sparked celebrations in the city of Rafah, where Palestinians handed out candy and sweets on the streets. A resident described the attack as "a natural response to the harm settlers inflict on the Palestinian residents in the West Bank".

MEMRI, commenting on reactions to the murders in the Palestinian media, stated that while Sawsan Al-Barghouti, a columnist for a website affiliated with Hamas, called the Itamar murders a "heroic act", in the rest of the Palestinian media the murder of children ("even of settlers") was strongly condemned as unequivocally immoral and contrary to Palestinian values, and as doing nothing to help the Palestinian cause. One editorial, for example, stated: "Stabbing an infant to death is a crime against humanity. Whoever did this was insane, or charged with racist assumptions. This is not nationalist; there is no connection between the murder of the infant in the settlement of Itamar and the values of our people's struggle." Many questioned whether such a murderer could be Palestinian. The PLO condemned the murders and accused Israel of jumping to the conclusion that the perpetrator was Palestinian and of exploiting the tragedy for its own political gains. A report in Haaretz reported that Palestinians in newspapers and on social networking sites condemned the attack while also criticizing settlers and the Israeli government's declaration of new settlement units in retaliation.

An opinion poll conducted by the Harry S. Truman Research Institute for the Advancement of Peace and the Palestinian Center for Policy and Survey Research found that 63% of Palestinians surveyed opposed the attack while 32% supported it. The groups interviewed 1,270 adults face-to-face in the West Bank, East Jerusalem, and Gaza Strip from 17 to 19 March 2011.

In January 2012, Palestinian Authority television aired an interview with the mother and aunt of Hakim Awad, who praised him as "a hero" and "a legend". Hakim's mother Nawef, who had previously denied her son's involvement, now proudly admitted it. The broadcast was part of a weekly show focusing on Palestinian prisoners in Israel.

On 1 February 2012, the Tomb of Eleazar was found spray-painted with Arabic slogans praising the perpetrators. The vandalism was discovered by 500 Jewish worshippers and their IDF escorts during a pilgrimage to the site. Soldiers and worshippers then covered the tomb with white paint to mask the graffiti.

=== American ===
A memorial service for the Fogel family was held at New York's Congregation Kehilath Jeshurun a week after the attack. It was attended by 1,000 local residents, with 2,000 more viewing a live broadcast over the internet. The president of the New York Board of Rabbis, Rabbi Yaakov Kermaier, said the victims "were treated as criminals for settling and building beautiful lives in the heartland of our ancestral holy land." Pastor of the Canaan Baptist Church in Harlem, Reverend Jacques DeGraff, told the gathered mourners, "I'm here today because it is not enough for the friends of Israel to issue a statement." The service was jointly sponsored by the Conference of Presidents of Major American Jewish Organizations, the Consulate General of Israel in New York, the Jewish Community Relations Council of New York, the UJA-Federation of New York, and Congregation Kehilath Jeshurun.

Gary Rosenblatt, editor-in-chief of The Jewish Week, commented that reactions to the Itamar killings may have been more muted given that the victims were religious Israelis living in a small West Bank settlement. He claimed that had the victims been secular Jews living inside the Green Line "outrage would have been far greater".

=== Italian ===
A delegation of Italian Jews from Rome visited Itamar on 30 March and extended a donation of €25,000 to support the three surviving children of the Fogel family. The president of the Jewish community of Rome, Riccardo Pacifici, said, "We come with a message of solidarity and support."

=== Finnish ===
A team of Finnish performers wrote a song in memory of the Fogel family for the annual Benei Akiva Jewish Eurovision contest, held this year in Rome, Italy. The team was inspired by the fact that daughter Tamar Fogel's life was spared owing to her being out of the house at the time of the attack, attending a Benei Akiva event.

== Official reactions ==
Involved parties

Israel:

- President Shimon Peres said, "This is one of the ugliest and most difficult events that we have known, the murder of parents with their small children – among them a three-year-old boy, and a five-month-old baby girl – while they were sleeping in their beds. It shows the loss of humanity... There is no religion in the world, no faith that allows for such horrendous acts."
- Prime Minister Benjamin Netanyahu stated that he was "deeply shocked" and that he stands behind the residents of the West Bank, adding, "We will not allow terror to determine the settlement map." He also told Palestinian President Mahmoud Abbas that it was not enough to condemn the violence because it "is against Palestinian interests", but because it is morally unacceptable. "I expect that you stop the incitement in the schools, school books and mosques, and educate your children toward peace, as we do. The murder of children in their sleep is murder for the sake of murder." He blamed the terror attack on continuing incitement against Jews in the Palestinian Authority.
- Foreign Minister Avigdor Lieberman visited the Fogel family's home in Itamar three days after the killings and expressed his admiration for the people of Itamar, stressing that it is "the state's duty to guarantee the security of Israel's residents" and that there should be no security compromises by Israel and no retreat to the 1967 borders. Lieberman also urged the Palestinian Authority to end incitement, stating that "we cannot talk peace with anyone talking about bloodshed, hatred, and murder. We must draw conclusions on the political level".
- In what Haaretz described as "an unprecedented decision", the Israeli Minister of Public Diplomacy and Diaspora Affairs Yuli Edelstein decided to release horrific photographs from the scene of the attack. The photos show the stabbed and bleeding bodies of the members of the Fogel family, with only their faces blurred, as requested by their relatives. Although the photographs were distributed to the international media, no serious news organization has published them to date.
- IDF Chief of Staff, Rav Aluf Benny Gantz, visited Itamar the day after the attack and vowed, "We will not rest until we lay our hands on the murderers. This incident is atrocious, its perpetrators capable of beastly crimes." At a meeting of the IDF senior command early the following week, Gantz remarked, "I have seen many things in my life but I have never encountered such inhumanity."
- Opposition leader Tzipi Livni expressed outrage over the attack but criticized the government decision to approve 500 housing units in the West Bank as a response to the terror attack, because she felt it links the building to terror.
- Arab-Israeli Knesset member Ahmad Tibi called the perpetrator a "coward", and said that "the Palestinian nation is ashamed of such people, who distort its image and its righteous struggle to free itself of the occupation. A struggle must be moral, conscionable, and fair. There are rules to the struggle against the occupation".

Palestinian territories:

- Palestinian Authority President Mahmoud Abbas telephoned Israeli Prime Minister Benjamin Netanyahu to condemn the attack. In an initial statement released by his office, Abbas stressed his "rejection and condemnation at all violence directed against civilians, regardless of who was behind it or the reason for it," adding that "violence produces violence and what is needed is to speed up a just and comprehensive solution to the conflict." In a later interview with Israel Radio, Abbas called it a despicable, immoral, and inhuman act, saying, "A human being is not capable of something like that." "Scenes like these – the murder of infants and children and a woman slaughtered – cause any person endowed with humanity to hurt and to cry." He dismissed Prime Minister Netanyahu's claim that the Palestinian Authority was inciting violence against Israel, and called for an Israeli-Palestinian-American committee to examine Netanyahu's claim of incitement in Palestinian textbooks. Prime Minister Netanyahu praised Abbas for condemning the murders but said that he must make his condemnation in Palestinian media as well. During the opening session of the PLO Central Council, Abbas accused Israel of always rushing to blame the Palestinians, and stated that "the facts are still unknown, yet, Israel insists on its position before the facts are known". Abbas said Israeli settlers in the West Bank were responsible for crimes against the Palestinians on a daily basis, and that "the international community and the public in Israel should talk about these crimes, and identify them as crimes", adding that this does not justify the attack.
- Palestinian Authority Prime Minister Salam Fayyad said he "clearly and firmly denounces the terror attack, just as I have denounced crimes against Palestinians." During a tour in Bethlehem he said, "We are against all types of violence ... Our position has not changed. As we have said many times before, we categorically oppose violence and terror, regardless of the identity of the victims or the perpetrators."
- Palestinian Authority Foreign Minister Riyad al-Maliki rejected accusations that Palestinians were behind the attack, stating that "killing an infant and slaughtering four other people from the same family in such a way had never been done by a Palestinian under any name for revenge. This would leave so many question marks on why the Israelis had immediately accused the Palestinians of committing it."
- According to the Palestinian Authority-run news website WAFA, "Israeli authorities ordered the publishing of bloody photos of the murders, using them to blackmail Abbas and pressure him to resume negotiations, although Netanyahu knows that the killer is not anonymous anymore and for sure not a Palestinian".
- Minister of Religious Affairs Mahmoud Habbash condemned the attack as "a big crime against civilians in their homes, an inhuman crime." In a telephone interview with The Jerusalem Post Habbash insisted that the Palestinians "are against such crimes from both sides, and against any murders, whether from the Palestinian or Israeli side. We want to see all the civilians living in peace in the Holy Land."
- Hamas official Ezzat Al-Rashak denied Hamas' responsibility for the attack, saying, "harming children is not part of Hamas' policy, nor is it the policy of the opposition factions." Rashak also raised the possibility that the attack was carried out by settlers for criminal motives. Hamas spokesman Sami Abu Zuhri complained about the Palestinian Authority arresting three of its activists and said "The report of five murdered Israelis is not enough to punish someone. However, we completely support the resistance against settlers who murder and use crime and terror against the Palestinian people under the auspices of the Israeli occupation soldiers."
- Al-Aqsa Martyrs Brigades said "the heroic operation is a natural response to the (Israeli) occupation crimes against our people in West Bank and Gaza Strip".
- The official press agency of the People's Republic of China claimed that the Islamic Jihad Movement in Palestine called it "a heroic attack," saying that "this attack is a proof that the Palestinians are able to go ahead with armed resistance and overcome all difficulties to reach the targets."

Intergovernmental organizations

- United Nations: Secretary-General Ban Ki-moon's office published a statement saying, "The Secretary-General condemns last night's shocking murder of an Israeli family of five, including three children, in a West Bank settlement. He calls for the perpetrators to be brought to justice, and for all to act with restraint."
- Quartet on the Middle East representative Tony Blair said, "this brutal and appalling murder is shocking and deplorable," and sent his "deepest condolences and sympathy to those remaining members of the family and to the community."

International

- Australia: The Australian government condemned the attack and extended its condolences to the surviving family members and friends. Foreign Minister Kevin Rudd called the attack "a despicable act of terrorism" and said, "There can be no justification for the brutal murder of three innocent children and their parents."
- Belgium: The Belgian Ministry of Foreign Affairs issued a statement broadly condemning "the outburst of violence in Israel and in the Occupied Palestinian Territory," referring to the attack in Itamar, a subsequent bomb attack in Jerusalem, violence in the Gaza Strip, and missile attacks against Israeli citizens from Gaza. The statement said that Foreign Minister Steven Vanackere "very firmly condemns the use of any violence against civilians. It is intolerable to inflict terror by using random violence, endangering the lives of children, women and men."
- Canada: Canadian Foreign Minister Lawrence Cannon said in a statement, "The brutal killing of five Israelis, including children, cannot be justified." He called the atrocities "heinous acts of terror" and demanded the full cooperation of the Palestinian Authority in holding the murderers accountable.
- Cyprus: Cypriot President Dimitris Christofias condemned the attack, calling its perpetrators "inhuman", and expressed condolences to the family and to the people of Israel.
- France: Foreign Minister Alain Juppé said that "France utterly condemns the assassination of five members of an Israeli family yesterday in the settlement of Itamar, on the West Bank. Among the victims of this barbarous act were three children, including a baby", and offered his condolences to the family of the victims and the Israeli authorities. Juppé further stated that France "condemns all acts of violence in the occupied territories and calls for maximum restraint in order to prevent deterioration in the situation. The quest for peace through negotiations must prevail." The French consul-general in Jerusalem, Frédérique Desagleau, attended the funeral of the five victims. French Ambassador to Israel Christophe Bigot visited the parents of Ruth Fogel to present condolences.
- Germany: Foreign Minister Guido Westerwelle condemned the "cruel and heinous" slayings, saying, "nothing can justify such attacks."
- Greece: Greek Foreign Ministry spokesman Gregory Delavekouras stated that "we unequivocally condemn the murder of a five-member Israeli family – including three young children – and express our deep condolences and support to the relatives and friends. The murder of children in their sleep is an inconceivably ungodly, inhuman, and barbarous act", and called for the murderers to be brought to justice immediately. The statement also urged the peace process to continue and reiterated that the settlements were illegal, but stated that "any act of violence against civilians is condemnable, whatever its source".
- Ireland: Irish Tánaiste and Minister of Foreign Affairs, Eamon Gilmore, condemned the murder of the Fogel family, calling it "an appalling act of violence" and "a senseless atrocity." Gilmore urged Israelis and Palestinians to resume direct peace talks and move toward "a just settlement, based on two States living side by side."
- Italy: Speaker of the Chamber of Deputies, Gianfranco Fini, telephoned his Israeli counterpart, Reuven Rivlin, and denounced the attack as a "most terrible and tragic event." He offered condolences on behalf of the Italian people to the bereaved family and to the entire people of Israel.
- Japan: The Japanese Foreign Ministry stated that "Japan strongly condemns the murder which occurred 12 March in Itamar, northern West Bank. Japan expresses its heartfelt sympathy for the victims and sends condolences to the bereaved relatives. Such an act cannot be justified for any reason, and any attempt to justify violence is unacceptable."
- Netherlands: The Dutch Foreign Ministry expressed "outrage" at the killings, stating that "a crime like this can never be justified", called for all perpetrators to be brought to justice, and urged the Palestinian Authority to cooperate in arresting the suspects. It also stressed that it agreed with the Quartet in stressing the importance of achieving peace between Israel and its neighbors. Foreign Minister Uri Rosenthal offered condolences to the victims' family and Israel.
- Norway: Norwegian Foreign Minister Jonas Gahr Støre released a statement saying, "I condemn the brutal killing of a family of six Israelis in the West Bank. This is a criminal act, and those responsible must be brought to justice as soon as possible."
- Spain: The Foreign Ministry of Spain issued a statement condemning the attack "in the most energetic terms" and expressed hope that it would not lead to an escalation of violence in the region.
- Turkey: Turkish Foreign Minister Ahmet Davutoğlu published a message on the ministry's website calling the attack "unacceptable." He stressed that the "act of terror, against innocent children is a crime that violates the most basic of rights, the right to life."
- United Kingdom: Foreign Secretary William Hague said, "The friends and relatives of the family killed in Itamar have my deepest sympathies. This was an act of incomprehensible cruelty and brutality which I utterly condemn. We hope the perpetrator is swiftly brought to justice."
- United States: White House spokesman Jay Carney said, "There is no possible justification for the killing of parents and children in their home. We call on the Palestinian Authority to unequivocally condemn this terrorist attack and for the perpetrators of this heinous crime to be held accountable." Secretary of State Hillary Clinton said, "I was shocked and deeply saddened to learn of the brutal murder of an Israeli family. The United States condemns this appalling attack in the strongest possible terms. To kill three innocent children and their parents while they sleep is an inhuman crime for which there can be no justification".

== Commemoration ==
In February 2012, more than 1,000 members of the Likud party visited Itamar and planted 1,500 trees in memory of the Fogel family victims as part of annual Tu Bishvat festivities throughout Israel.

== See also ==
- 2002 Itamar attack
- 2002 Metzer attack
- August 2010 West Bank shooting attack
- List of massacres in the Palestinian territories
- Palestinian political violence
- Timeline of the Israeli–Palestinian conflict in 2011
