= Timeline of the Israeli–Palestinian conflict in 2012 =

- Timeline of the Israeli–Palestinian conflict
- 2011; 2012; 2013

This page is a listing of incidents of violence in the Israeli–Palestinian conflict in 2012.

- IDT = Israeli (civilians/soldiers) killed by Palestinians; cumulative
- PDT = Palestinians (civilians/militants) killed by Israelis; cumulative.

This is a timeline of deaths caused by rockets, missiles and gunfire in Israel and Palestine in 2012 as part of the Israeli–Palestinian conflict.

== 1 January to 23 October ==
Total: 72+

Palestinians: 70+

Israelis: 1

== 24–27 October ==
Total: 6

Palestinians: 6

Israelis: 0

== 29 October to 1 November ==
Total: 1

Palestinians: 1

Israelis: 0

== 2 November to 5 November ==
Total: 2

Palestinians: 2

Israelis: 0

== 6 November to 7 November ==
Total:

== 8 November to 10 November ==
Total: 7

Palestinians: 80 (69 children)

Israelis: 1

== 11 November to 13 November ==
Total:

== 14 November ==
This was the first day of Operation Pillar of Cloud

Palestinians: 13 (including 2-3 children and 1 woman)

Israelis: 0

== 15 November and 21 November ==
Total: 100+

Palestinians: 100+ (including 23+ children and 10+ women)

Israelis: 5 (4 civilians, one soldier)
